= 2024 Kashima Antlers season =

Kashima Antlers
2024 season
- Chairman: Fumiaki Koizumi
- Manager: Ranko Popović (until 6 October); Masaki Chugo (from 9 October)
- Stadium: Kashima Soccer Stadium
- J1 League: 5th
- Emperor's Cup: Quarter-finals
- J.League Cup: First round
- Top goalscorer: League: Yuma Suzuki (15 goals); All: Yuma Suzuki (16 goals)
- Highest home attendance: 52,860 v Yokohama F. Marinos; 1 June 2024 (J1 League)
- Lowest home attendance: 4,150 v Nara Club; 12 June 2024 (Emperor's Cup)
- Average home league attendance: 22,998
- Biggest win: 0–4 v Albirex Niigata (Away); 5 October 2024 (J1 League)
- Biggest defeat: 4–1 v Yokohama F. Marinos (Away); 14 July 2024 (J1 League)
Home colours	Away colours

The 2024 season was Kashima Antlers' 32nd consecutive season in the J1 League, the top flight of Japanese football since the introduction of professional football in 1993. As well as the domestic league, they competed in the Emperor's Cup and the J.League Cup.

== Squad ==
=== Season squad ===
Squad no.	Name	Nationality	Position(s)	Date of birth (age at start of season)
Goalkeepers
1	Tomoki Hayakawa	(Japan)	GK	3 March 1999 (aged 24)
29	Yuji Kajikawa	(Japan)	GK	26 July 1991 (aged 32)
31	Taiki Yamada	(Japan)	GK	8 January 2002 (aged 22)
38	Park Eui-jeong	(South Korea)	GK	22 May 2004 (aged 19)
Defenders
2	Koki Anzai	(Japan)	RB / LB	31 May 1995 (aged 28)
5	Ikuma Sekigawa	(Japan)	CB	13 September 2000 (aged 23)
16	Hidehiro Sugai	(Japan)	LB	27 October 1998 (aged 25)
28	Shuhei Mizoguchi	(Japan)	LB	13 February 2004 (aged 20)
32	Kimito Nono	(Japan)	RB	26 February 2002 (aged 21)
39	Keisuke Tsukui	(Japan)	DF	21 May 2004 (aged 19)
42	Haruto Matsumoto ^{Type 2}	(Japan)	RB	29 September 2006 (aged 17)
55	Naomichi Ueda	(Japan)	CB	24 October 1994 (aged 29)
Midfielders
4	Radomir Milosavljević	(Serbia)	CM / AM	28 July 1992 (aged 31)
6	Kento Misao	(Japan)	DM	16 April 1996 (aged 27)
10	Gaku Shibasaki (c)	(Japan)	CM / DM	28 May 1992 (aged 31)
14	Yuta Higuchi	(Japan)	RM / CM	30 October 1996 (aged 27)
15	Tomoya Fujii	(Japan)	LM / RM	4 December 1998 (aged 25)
17	Talles	(Brazil)	LW / AM	12 May 1998 (aged 25)
26	Naoki Sutoh	(Japan)	LM / RM	1 October 2002 (aged 21)
30	Shintaro Nago	(Japan)	CM / AM	17 April 1996 (aged 27)
33	Hayato Nakama	(Japan)	LM / AM	16 May 1992 (aged 31)
34	Yu Funabashi	(Japan)	DM	12 July 2002 (aged 21)
77	Guilherme Parede	(Brazil)	LW / RW	19 September 1995 (aged 28)
Forwards
7	Aleksandar Čavrić	(Serbia)	FW / RW	18 May 1994 (aged 29)
11	Kyosuke Tagawa	(Japan)	FW / LW	11 February 1999 (aged 25)
13	Kei Chinen	(Japan)	FW / RW	17 March 1995 (aged 28)
36	Shu Morooka	(Japan)	FW / RW	9 December 2000 (aged 23)
40	Yuma Suzuki	(Japan)	FW	28 April 1996 (aged 27)
41	Homare Tokuda ^{Type 2}	(Japan)	FW	18 February 2007 (aged 17)

Last updated: 15 August 2024.
Source: Kashima Antlers website

== Transfers ==
=== Arrivals ===
Date	Position	Player	From	Type	Source
9 June 2023	DF	(Japan) Kimito Nono	(Japan) Kwansei Gakuin University	Full	
8 December 2023	GK	(Japan) Taiki Yamada	(Japan) Fagiano Okayama	Loan return	
24 December 2023	MF	(Brazil) Guilherme Parede	(Argentina) Talleres	Loan	
28 December 2023	GK	(Japan) Yuji Kajikawa	(Japan) Júbilo Iwata	Full	
29 January 2024	FW	(Serbia) Aleksandar Čavrić	(Slovakia) Slovan Bratislava	Loan	
22 March 2024	MF	(Serbia) Radomir Milosavljević	(Serbia) FK Vojvodina	Full	
15 July 2024	MF	(Japan) Kento Misao	(Belgium) OH Leuven	Full	
9 August 2024	FW	(Japan) Kyosuke Tagawa	(Scotland) Hearts	Full	
15 August 2024	MF	(Brazil) Talles	(Ukraine) FC Rukh Lviv	Loan	

=== Departures ===
Date	Position	Player	To	Type	Source
30 November 2023	GK	(South Korea) Kwoun Sun-tae		Retired	
7 December 2023	FW	(Nigeria) Blessing Eleke		Released	
7 December 2023	MF	(Brazil) Arthur Caíke		Released	
7 December 2023	MF	(Brazil) Diego Pituca	(Brazil) Santos	Full	
8 December 2023	MF	(Japan) Yusuke Ogawa	(Japan) FC Ryukyu	Loan	
24 December 2023	MF	(Japan) Ryotaro Araki	(Japan) FC Tokyo	Loan	
25 December 2023	DF	(Japan) Gen Shoji	(Japan) FC Machida Zelvia	Full	
26 December 2023	MF	(Japan) Ryotaro Nakamura	(Japan) Shimizu S-Pulse	Loan	
26 December 2023	GK	(Japan) Yuya Oki	(Japan) Shimizu S-Pulse	Full	
3 January 2024	DF	(South Korea) Kim Min-tae	(Japan) Shonan Bellmare	Full	
5 January 2024	DF	(Japan) Rikuto Hirose	(Japan) Vissel Kobe	Full	
4 July 2024	FW	(Japan) Yuki Kakita	(Japan) Kashiwa Reysol	Full	
4 July 2024	MF	(Japan) Kaishu Sano	(Germany) 1. FSV Mainz 05	Full	
21 July 2024	MF	(Japan) Yuta Matsumura	(Japan) Tokyo Verdy	Loan	
25 July 2024	MF	(Japan) Shoma Doi	(Japan) Montedio Yamagata	Full	

== Pre-season and friendlies ==
27 January Training match	Tegevajaro Miyazaki	1–2	Kashima Antlers	Miyazaki
	Ueno	Report	Parede; Tokuda	Stadium: Hinata Stadium
Note: The match was played with two halves lasting 45 minutes each, and one half lasting 30 minutes.

30 January Training match	Tokushima Vortis	1–3	Kashima Antlers	Miyazaki
		Report	Suzuki; Tokuda	Stadium: Hinata Stadium
Note: The match was played with two halves lasting 45 minutes each, and one half lasting 30 minutes.

2 February Training match	Ventforet Kofu	2–0	Kashima Antlers	Miyazaki
		Report		Stadium: Hinata Stadium

10 February Friendly	Kashima Antlers	1–0	Mito HollyHock	Kashima
14:00	Higuchi 21'	Report		Stadium: Kashima Soccer Stadium
Note: Ibaraki Soccer Festival

10 February Friendly	Kashima Antlers	1–0	Mito HollyHock	Kashima
14:00	Higuchi 21'	Report		Stadium: Kashima Soccer Stadium
Note: Ibaraki Soccer Festival

24 July Friendly	Kashima Antlers	1–5	(England) Brighton & Hove Albion	Tokyo
19:00 JST	Tokuda 84'	Report	Minteh 15'; Samuels (yellow card) 27'; Sarmiento 51'; Ayari 54'; Cozier-Duberry 63', 74'	Stadium: Japan National Stadium; Attendance: 25,172

== Competitions ==
=== Overview ===
Competition	First match	Last match	Starting round	Final position	Record							
Competition	First match	Last match	Starting round	Final position	Pld	W	D	L	GF	GA	GD	Win %
J1 League	23 February 2024	8 December 2024	Matchday 1	5th	38	18	11	9	60	41	+19	47.37
J.League Cup	17 April 2024	22 May 2024	First round (Match 2)	First round (Match 3)	2	1	0	1	2	3	−1	50.00
Emperor's Cup	12 June 2024	25 September 2024	Second round	Quarter-finals	4	3	0	1	6	6	+0	75.00
Total					44	22	11	11	68	50	+18	50.00

Source: Competitions

=== J1 League ===
Pos	Team	Pld	W	D	L	GF	GA	GD	Pts	Qualification or relegation
3	Machida Zelvia	38	19	9	10	54	34	+20	66	Qualification for the AFC Champions League Elite league stage (Note: Since the winners of the 2024 Emperor's Cup, Vissel Kobe, had already qualified for the Champions League Elite, the spot given to the Emperor's Cup winners (Champions League Elite) was passed to the third-placed team. Consequently, the spot given to the third-placed team (Champions League Two) was passed to the fourth-placed team.)
4	Gamba Osaka	38	18	12	8	49	35	+14	66	Qualification for the AFC Champions League Two group stage
5	Kashima Antlers	38	18	11	9	60	41	+19	65	
6	Tokyo Verdy	38	14	14	10	51	51	0	56	
7	FC Tokyo	38	15	9	14	53	51	+2	54	

Source: JLeague.co, JLeague.jp, J.League Data Site
Rules for classification: 1) Points; 2) Goal difference; 3) Goals scored; 4) Head-to-head points; 5) Head-to-head goal difference; 6) Head-to-head goals scored; 7) Fewer disciplinary points.

==== Results by matchday ====
Round	1	2	3	4	5	6	7	8	9	10	11	12	13	14	15	16	17	18	19	20	21	22	23	24	25	26	27	28	29	30	31	32	33	34	35	36	37	38
Ground	A	H	A	H	H	A	A	H	A	A	H	A	H	A	H	A	H	H	A	H	A	H	A	H	H	A	H	A	H	H	A	A	H	A	H	A	A	H
Result	W	D	L	W	W	L	L	W	L	W	W	W	D	W	W	W	W	D	D	D	L	W	L	W	W	L	D	L	D	D	L	W	D	W	D	D	W	W
Position	1	1	8	4	4	5	8	6	8	5	5	3	3	3	3	2	2	2	2	2	2	2	4	3	2	2	3	4	4	4	4	4	4	4	5	5	5	5

Source: J. League Data Site
A = Away; H = Home; W = Win; D = Draw; L = Loss

==== Results summary ====
Overall								Home						Away					
Pld	W	D	L	GF	GA	GD	Pts	W	D	L	GF	GA	GD	W	D	L	GF	GA	GD
38	18	11	9	60	41	+19	65	10	9	0	28	13	+15	8	2	9	32	28	+4

Source: Worldfootball

==== Matches ====
The full league fixtures were released on 23 January 2024.

23 February 1	Nagoya Grampus	0–3	Kashima Antlers	Toyota
18:03 JST		Report	Nakama 19', 62'; Čavrić 47'	Stadium: Toyota Stadium; Attendance: 36,933; Referee: Yusuke Araki

2 March 2	Kashima Antlers	1–1	Cerezo Osaka	Kashima
15:03 JST	Ueda 85'	Report	Ceará 58'	Stadium: Kashima Soccer Stadium; Attendance: 24,664; Referee: Hayato Shimizu

9 March 3	FC Machida Zelvia	1–0	Kashima Antlers	Machida
14:03 JST	Hirakawa 13'	Report		Stadium: Machida GION Stadium; Attendance: 11,901; Referee: Ismail Elfath

17 March 4	Kashima Antlers	2–1	Kawasaki Frontale	Kashima
15:03 JST	Čavrić 47'; Suzuki 50'	Report	Marcinho 36' (yellow card) 54' (yellow-red card) 75'	Stadium: Kashima Soccer Stadium; Attendance: 24,947; Referee: Futoshi Nakamura

30 March 5	Kashima Antlers	1–0	Júbilo Iwata	Kashima
15:03 JST	Suzuki 33' (pen.)	Report		Stadium: Kashima Soccer Stadium; Attendance: 21,069; Referee: Koei Koya

3 April 6	Avispa Fukuoka	1–0	Kashima Antlers	Fukuoka
19:03 JST	Zahedi 52'	Report		Stadium: Best Denki Stadium; Attendance: 5,472; Referee: Koichiro Fukushima

7 April 7	FC Tokyo	2–0	Kashima Antlers	Tokyo
17:04 JST	Nakagawa 55'; Harakawa 90+7'	Report		Stadium: Japan National Stadium; Attendance: 52,772; Referee: Hayato Shimizu

13 April 8	Kashima Antlers	1–0	Kyoto Sanga	Kashima
15:03 JST	Nono 85'	Report		Stadium: Kashima Soccer Stadium; Attendance: 13,781; Referee: Yuichi Nishimura

20 April 9	Sagan Tosu	4–2	Kashima Antlers	Tosu
14:04 JST	Kawahara 30'; Marcelo Ryan 45+3', 80'; Fukuta 88'	Report	Nono 11'; Suzuki 86'	Stadium: Ekimae Real Estate Stadium; Attendance: 8,357; Referee: Yoshiro Imamura

28 April 10	Gamba Osaka	1–2	Kashima Antlers	Suita
15:03 JST	Sakamoto 39'	Report	Nakama 27'; Nono 54'	Stadium: Panasonic Stadium Suita; Attendance: 28,616; Referee: Futoshi Nakamura

3 May 11	Kashima Antlers	3–1	Shonan Bellmare	Kashima
15:03 JST	Suzuki 50', 62'; Čavrić 67'	Report	Fukuda 85'	Stadium: Kashima Soccer Stadium; Attendance: 26,924; Referee: Masuya Ueda

6 May 12	Kashiwa Reysol	1–2	Kashima Antlers	Kashiwa
16:03 JST	Shimamura 65'	Report	Nago 4'; Čavrić 90+2'	Stadium: Sankyo Frontier Kashiwa Stadium; Attendance: 13,384; Referee: Yuichi Nishimura

12 May 13	Kashima Antlers	3–3	Tokyo Verdy	Kashima
13:10 JST	Suzuki 5' (pen.); Nago 8'; Ueda 50'	Report	Saito 69'; Kimura 81'; Miki 90+3'	Stadium: Kashima Soccer Stadium; Attendance: 18,803; Referee: Yusuke Araki

15 May 14	Sanfrecce Hiroshima	1–3	Kashima Antlers	Hiroshima
19:03 JST	Marcos Júnior 65'	Report	Ueda 5'; Suzuki 15' (pen.); Čavrić 84'	Stadium: Edion Peace Wing Hiroshima; Attendance: 25,302; Referee: Yudai Yamamoto

19 May 15	Kashima Antlers	1–0	Vissel Kobe	Kashima
15:03 JST	Nono 81'	Report		Stadium: Kashima Soccer Stadium; Attendance: 20,390; Referee: Hayato Shimizu

25 May 16	Hokkaido Consadole Sapporo	0–3	Kashima Antlers	Sapporo
14:03 JST		Report	Nago 40', 55'; Čavrić 87'	Stadium: Sapporo Dome; Attendance: 12,651; Referee: Futoshi Nakamura

1 June 17	Kashima Antlers	3–2	Yokohama F. Marinos	Tokyo
15:03 JST	Suzuki 57'; Nono 74'; Sekigawa 84'	Report	Anderson Lopes 10'; Uenaka 90+4'	Stadium: Japan National Stadium; Attendance: 52,860; Referee: Hiroyuki Kimura

16 June 18	Kashima Antlers	1–1	Albirex Niigata	Kashima
18:03 JST	Fujii 50'	Report	Komi 43'	Stadium: Kashima Soccer Stadium; Attendance: 15,499; Referee: Yuichi Nishimura

22 June 19	Urawa Red Diamonds	2–2	Kashima Antlers	Saitama
19:03 JST	Takeda 77', 90+2'	Report	Suzuki 3', 42'	Stadium: Saitama Stadium 2002; Attendance: 48,638; Referee: Jumpei Iida

26 June 20	Kashima Antlers	0–0	Gamba Osaka	Kashima
19:03 JST		Report		Stadium: Kashima Soccer Stadium; Attendance: 11,848; Referee: Darren England

30 June 21	Vissel Kobe	3–1	Kashima Antlers	Kobe
19:03 JST	Muto 18'; Matheus Thuler 38'; Osako 62'	Report	Čavrić 6'	Stadium: Noevir Stadium Kobe; Attendance: 21,963; Referee: Takafumi Mikuriya

6 July 22	Kashima Antlers	2–0	Hokkaido Consadole Sapporo	Kashima
18:03 JST	Morooka 61'; Fujii 66'	Report		Stadium: Kashima Soccer Stadium; Attendance: 16,461; Referee: Hiroki Kasahara

14 July 23	Yokohama F. Marinos	4–1	Kashima Antlers	Yokohama
19:33 JST	Amano 45+3'; Eduardo 52'; Élber 71'; Uenaka 90+6'	Report	Chinen 29'	Stadium: Nissan Stadium; Attendance: 31,463; Referee: Shu Kawamata

20 July 24	Kashima Antlers	2–1	FC Tokyo	Kashima
18:04 JST	Nago 30'; Nono 47'	Report	Endo 41'	Stadium: Kashima Soccer Stadium; Attendance: 24,304; Referee: Yudai Yamamoto

7 August 25	Kashima Antlers	3–0	Sagan Tosu	Kashima
19:03 JST	Nono 18'; Nakama 53'; Anzai 79'	Report		Stadium: Kashima Soccer Stadium; Attendance: 14,106; Referee: Hiroyuki Kimura

11 August 26	Júbilo Iwata	2–1	Kashima Antlers	Fukuroi
19:03 JST	Yamada 77'; Furukawa 89'	Report	Suzuki 38' (pen.)	Stadium: Shizuoka Stadium ECOPA; Attendance: 32,995; Referee: Atsushi Kamimura

17 August 27	Kashima Antlers	0–0	Urawa Red Diamonds	Kashima
18:03 JST		Report		Stadium: Kashima Soccer Stadium; Attendance: 33,295; Referee: Takafumi Mikuriya

25 August 28	Tokyo Verdy	2–1	Kashima Antlers	Tokyo
18:04 JST	Yamami 63', 75'	Report	Suzuki 90' (pen.)	Stadium: Ajinomoto Stadium; Attendance: 24,814; Referee: Hiroki Kasahara

14 September 29	Kashima Antlers	2–2	Sanfrecce Hiroshima	Kashima
18:04 JST	Chinen 17'; Tokuda 82'	Report	Paciência 19'; Matsumoto 36'	Stadium: Kashima Soccer Stadium; Attendance: 22,448; Referee: Akihiko Ikeuchi
Note: Matchweek 30

21 September 30	Kashima Antlers	0–0	Kashiwa Reysol	Kashima
18:03 JST		Report		Stadium: Kashima Soccer Stadium; Attendance: 21,384; Referee: Koichiro Fukushima
Note: Matchweek 31

28 September 31	Shonan Bellmare	3–2	Kashima Antlers	Hiratsuka
19:03 JST	Suzuki 45+3'; Hata 65'; Fukuda 67'	Report	Nono 22', 27'	Stadium: Lemon Gas Stadium Hiratsuka; Attendance: 11,404; Referee: Hayato Shimizu
Note: Matchweek 32

5 October 32	Albirex Niigata	0–4	Kashima Antlers	Niigata
14:03 JST		Report	Chiba 12' (o.g.); Higuchi 15', 45+2'; Suzuki 53'	Stadium: Denka Big Swan Stadium; Attendance: 27,552; Referee: Hiroyuki Kimura
Note: Matchweek 33

19 October 33	Kashima Antlers	0–0	Avispa Fukuoka	Kashima
14:03 JST		Report		Stadium: Kashima Soccer Stadium; Attendance: 18,939; Referee: Jumpei Iida
Note: Matchweek 34

1 November 34	Kawasaki Frontale	1–3	Kashima Antlers	Kawasaki
19:03 JST	Yamamoto 90+2'	Report	Chinen 10'; Higuchi 18'; Misao 28'	Stadium: Uvance Todoroki Stadium by Fujitsu; Attendance: 20,834; Referee: Ryo Tanimoto
Note: Matchweek 35

9 November 35	Kashima Antlers	0–0	Nagoya Grampus	Kashima
14:03 JST	Suzuki (red card) 58'	Report		Stadium: Kashima Soccer Stadium; Attendance: 22,945; Referee: Masuya Ueda
Note: Matchweek 36

17 November 36	Kyoto Sanga	0–0	Kashima Antlers	Kameoka
14:03 JST		Report		Stadium: Sanga Stadium by Kyocera; Attendance: 15,205; Referee: Ryo Tanimoto
Note: Matchweek 29

30 November 37	Cerezo Osaka	0–2	Kashima Antlers	Osaka
14:03 JST		Report	Morooka 10'; Suzuki 14'	Stadium: Yodoko Sakura Stadium; Attendance: 21,171; Referee: Koei Koya

8 December 38	Kashima Antlers	3–1	Machida Zelvia	Kashima
14:03 JST	Morooka 5'; Higuchi 16'; Suzuki 45+2'	Report	Shimoda 23'	Stadium: Kashima Soccer Stadium; Attendance: 32,840; Referee: Hiroyuki Kimura

=== J.League Cup ===
The 2024 J.League Cup was expanded so that all 60 J.League clubs would participate.

17 April First round – Match 2	Vanraure Hachinohe	1–2 (a.e.t.)	Kashima Antlers	Hachinohe
18:33	Shibata 25'	Report	Anzai 82'; Nono (yellow card) 13' (yellow-red card) 104'; Chinen 108'	Stadium: Prifoods Stadium; Attendance: 4,844; Referee: Keigo Sendachi

22 May First round – Match 3	Machida Zelvia	2–0	Kashima Antlers	Machida
19:03	Duke 20', 36'	Report		Stadium: Machida GION Stadium; Attendance: 4,537; Referee: Takuto Okabe

=== Emperor's Cup ===
12 June Second round	Kashima Antlers	2–1	Nara Club	Kashima
19:03	Čavrić 21'; Suzuki 53'	Report	Yoshimura 41'	Stadium: Kashima Soccer Stadium; Attendance: 4,150; Referee: Akihiko Ikeuchi

10 July Third round	Kashima Antlers	2–1	Fujieda MYFC	Fujieda
19:03	Čavrić 70'; Nakama 89'	Report	Chaves 24' (pen.)	Stadium: Fujieda Soccer Stadium; Attendance: 3,069; Referee: Futoshi Nakamura

21 August Round of 16	Ventforet Kofu	1–2	Kashima Antlers	Kofu
19:04	Misawa 29'	Report	Fujii 45+2'; Ueda 90'	Stadium: JIT Recycle Ink Stadium; Attendance: 7,796; Referee: Yoshimi Yamashita

25 September Quarter-finals	Kashima Antlers	0–3	Vissel Kobe	Kobe
19:04		Report	Morioka 15'; Sasaki 83'; Ideguchi 90+7'	Stadium: Noevir Stadium Kobe; Attendance: 7,231; Referee: César Arturo Ramos (Mexico)

== Statistics ==
=== Appearances ===
Squad players with no appearances throughout the season are not listed.

No.	Pos.	Name	J1 League		Emperor's Cup		J.League Cup		Total	
No.	Pos.	Name	Apps	Goals	Apps	Goals	Apps	Goals	Apps	Goals
Goalkeepers
1	GK	(Japan) Tomoki Hayakawa	38	0	2	0	2	0	42	0
31	GK	(Japan) Taiki Yamada	0	0	2	0	0	0	2	0
Defenders
2	DF	(Japan) Koki Anzai	38	1	1+2	0	1+1	1	43	2
5	DF	(Japan) Ikuma Sekigawa	37	1	4	0	2	0	43	1
16	DF	(Japan) Hidehiro Sugai	1+12	0	3	0	2	0	18	0
32	DF	(Japan) Kimito Nono	31	9	4	0	1	0	36	9
28	DF	(Japan) Keisuke Tsukui	1+4	0	0	0	0	0	5	0
55	DF	(Japan) Naomichi Ueda	38	3	3+1	1	2	0	44	4
Midfielders
4	MF	(Serbia) Radomir Milosavljević	0+10	0	1	0	2	0	13	0
6	MF	(Japan) Kento Misao	12+3	1	2	0	0	0	17	1
10	MF	(Japan) Gaku Shibasaki	16+6	0	2+1	0	0+1	0	26	0
13	MF	(Japan) Kei Chinen	33	3	3	0	0+1	1	37	4
14	MF	(Japan) Yuta Higuchi	18+18	4	3+1	0	1+1	0	42	4
15	MF	(Japan) Tomoya Fujii	6+19	2	2+1	1	0	0	28	3
17	MF	(Brazil) Talles	1+7	0	0+1	0	0	0	9	0
30	MF	(Japan) Shintaro Nago	29+7	5	1+3	0	0+1	0	41	5
33	MF	(Japan) Hayato Nakama	25+3	4	1+1	1	0+1	0	31	5
34	MF	(Japan) Yu Funabashi	0+4	0	0+2	0	0	0	6	0
77	MF	(Brazil) Guilherme Parede	1+11	0	2	0	2	0	16	0
Forwards
7	FW	(Serbia) Aleksandar Čavrić	11+14	7	2	2	0+1	0	28	9
11	FW	(Japan) Kyosuke Tagawa	0+3	0	1	0	0	0	4	0
36	FW	(Japan) Shu Morooka	25+7	3	2+1	0	1+1	0	37	3
40	FW	(Japan) Yuma Suzuki	34+2	15	1+3	1	0+2	0	42	16
41	FW	(Japan) Homare Tokuda	0+12	1	0+2	0	0	0	14	1
Players loaned or transferred out during the season
8	MF	(Japan) Shoma Doi	3+8	0	1	0	1	0	13	0
25	MF	(Japan) Kaishu Sano	20	0	1	0	2	0	23	0
27	MF	(Japan) Yuta Matsumura	0+7	0	0	0	2	0	9	0
37	FW	(Japan) Yuki Kakita	0+4	0	0	0	1+1	0	6	0

Last updated: 11 January 2025.
Source: jleague.co, Soccer D.B.

=== Goalscorers ===
The list is sorted by shirt number when total goals are equal.

Rnk	Pos	No.	Player	J1	EC	JLC	Total
1	FW	40	(Japan) Yuma Suzuki	15	1	0	16
2	FW	7	(Serbia) Aleksandar Čavrić	7	2	0	9
2	DF	32	(Japan) Kimito Nono	9	0	0	9
4	MF	30	(Japan) Shintaro Nago	5	0	0	5
4	MF	33	(Japan) Hayato Nakama	4	1	0	5
6	FW	13	(Japan) Kei Chinen	3	0	1	4
6	MF	14	(Japan) Yuta Higuchi	4	0	0	4
6	DF	55	(Japan) Naomichi Ueda	3	1	0	4
8	MF	15	(Japan) Tomoya Fujii	2	1	0	3
8	FW	36	(Japan) Shu Morooka	3	0	0	3
10	DF	2	(Japan) Koki Anzai	1	0	1	2
12	DF	5	(Japan) Ikuma Sekigawa	1	0	0	1
12	MF	6	(Japan) Kento Misao	1	0	0	1
12	FW	41	(Japan) Homare Tokuda	1	0	0	1
12	–	–	Own goal	1	0	0	1
TOTAL				58	6	2	64

Source: jleague.co

=== Clean sheets ===
The list is sorted by shirt number when total clean sheets are equal.

Rnk	No.	Player	J1	EC	JLC	Total
1	1	(Japan) Tomoki Hayakawa	15	0	0	15
TOTALS			15	0	0	15

Source: fbref.com
