= 2023 Kashima Antlers season =

Kashima Antlers
2023 season
- Chairman: Fumiaki Koizumi
- Manager: Daiki Iwamasa
- Stadium: Kashima Soccer Stadium
- J1 League: 5th
- Emperor's Cup: Third round
- J.League Cup: Quarter-finals
- Top goalscorer: League: Yuma Suzuki (14 goals); All: Yuma Suzuki (14 goals)
- Highest home attendance: 56,020 v Nagoya Grampus; 14 May 2023 (J1 League)
- Lowest home attendance: 3,837 v Honda FC; 7 June 2023 (Emperor's Cup)
- Average home league attendance: 22,031
- Biggest win: 4–0 v Gamba Osaka (Home); 29 April 2023 (J1 League)
- Biggest defeat: 1–5 v Vissel Kobe (Away); 15 April 2023 (J1 League)
Home colours	Away colours

The 2023 season was Kashima Antlers' 31st consecutive season in the J1 League, the top flight of Japanese football since the introduction of professional football in 1993. The club finished the 2023 J1 League in fifth place, one place lower than the previous season. They also competed in the Emperor's Cup where they were knocked out in the third round and the J.League Cup where they reached the quarter-finals.

== Squad ==
=== Season squad ===
Squad no.	Name	Nationality	Position(s)	Date of birth (age at start of season)
Goalkeepers
1	Kwoun Sun-tae	(South Korea)	GK	11 September 1984 (aged 38)
29	Tomoki Hayakawa	(Japan)	GK	3 March 1999 (aged 23)
31	Yuya Oki	(Japan)	GK	22 August 1999 (aged 23)
38	Park Eui-jeong	(South Korea)	GK	22 May 2004 (aged 18)
Defenders
2	Koki Anzai	(Japan)	RB / LB	31 May 1995 (aged 27)
3	Gen Shoji	(Japan)	CB	11 December 1992 (aged 30)
5	Ikuma Sekigawa	(Japan)	CB	13 September 2000 (aged 22)
16	Hidehiro Sugai	(Japan)	LB	27 October 1998 (aged 24)
22	Rikuto Hirose	(Japan)	RB	23 September 1995 (aged 27)
28	Shuhei Mizoguchi	(Japan)	LB	13 February 2004 (aged 19)
39	Keisuke Tsukui	(Japan)	DF	21 May 2004 (aged 18)
55	Naomichi Ueda	(Japan)	CB	24 October 1994 (aged 28)
Midfielders
8	Shoma Doi (c)	(Japan)	SS / LW / RW	21 May 1992 (aged 30)
10	Ryotaro Araki	(Japan)	AM / FW	29 January 2002 (aged 21)
14	Yuta Higuchi	(Japan)	RM / CM	30 October 1996 (aged 26)
15	Tomoya Fujii	(Japan)	LM / RM	4 December 1998 (aged 24)
17	Arthur Caíke	(Brazil)	LW / FW	15 June 1992 (aged 30)
20	Gaku Shibasaki	(Japan)	CM / DM	28 May 1992 (aged 30)
21	Diego Pituca	(Brazil)	CM	15 August 1992 (aged 30)
24	Yusuke Ogawa	(Japan)	DM / CM	14 April 2002 (aged 20)
25	Kaishu Sano	(Japan)	DM	30 December 2000 (aged 22)
26	Naoki Sutoh	(Japan)	LM / RM	1 October 2002 (aged 20)
27	Yuta Matsumura	(Japan)	RM / LM	13 April 2001 (aged 21)
30	Shintaro Nago	(Japan)	CM / AM	17 April 1996 (aged 26)
33	Hayato Nakama	(Japan)	LM / AM	16 May 1992 (aged 30)
34	Yu Funabashi	(Japan)	DM	12 July 2002 (aged 20)
Forwards
13	Kei Chinen	(Japan)	FW / RW	17 March 1995 (aged 27)
19	Blessing Eleke	(Nigeria)	FW	5 March 1996 (aged 26)
36	Shu Morooka	(Japan)	FW	9 December 2000 (aged 22)
37	Yuki Kakita	(Japan)	FW	14 July 1997 (aged 25)
40	Yuma Suzuki	(Japan)	FW	28 April 1996 (aged 26)

Last updated: 1 September 2023.
Source: Kashima Antlers website

== Transfers ==
=== Arrivals ===
Date	Position	Player	From	Type	Source
20 September 2022	DF	(Japan) Keisuke Tsukui	(Japan) Shohei High School	Full	
17 November 2022	FW	(Japan) Shu Morooka	(Japan) Tokyo International University	Full	
25 November 2022	MF	(Japan) Tomoya Fujii	(Japan) Sanfrecce Hiroshima	Full	
26 November 2022	FW	(Japan) Kei Chinen	(Japan) Kawasaki Frontale	Full	
30 November 2022	DF	(Japan) Naomichi Ueda	(France) Nîmes	Full	
7 December 2022	GK	(South Korea) Park Eui-jeong	(South Korea) Hanyang Technical High School	Full	
8 December 2022	DF	(Japan) Gen Shoji	(Japan) Gamba Osaka	Full	
21 December 2022	MF	(Japan) Kaishu Sano	(Japan) Machida Zelvia	Full	
25 July 2023	DF	(Japan) Hidehiro Sugai	(Japan) Ventforet Kofu	Full	
1 September 2023	MF	(Japan) Gaku Shibasaki		Free agent	

=== Departures ===
Date	Position	Player	To	Type	Source
30 November 2022	DF	(Japan) Daiki Sugioka	(Japan) Shonan Bellmare	Full	
7 December 2022	GK	(Japan) Taiki Yamada	(Japan) Fagiano Okayama	Loan	
8 December 2022	MF	(Japan) Ryuji Izumi	(Japan) Nagoya Grampus	Full	
12 December 2022	DF	(Japan) Kento Misao	(Portugal) Santa Clara	Full	
13 December 2022	MF	(Japan) Yoshihiro Shimoda	(Japan) Iwaki FC	Loan	
21 December 2022	DF	(Brazil) Bueno		Released	
22 December 2022	DF	(Japan) Naoki Hayashi	(Japan) Tokyo Verdy	Loan	
28 December 2022	FW	(Brazil) Everaldo	(Brazil) EC Bahia	Full	
26 January 2023	DF	(Japan) Itsuki Oda	(Japan) Avispa Fukuoka	Full	
29 March 2023	DF	(Japan) Koki Machida	(Belgium) Union SG	Full	
3 July 2023	DF	(South Korea) Kim Min-tae	(Japan) Shonan Bellmare	Loan	
4 July 2023	FW	(Japan) Itsuki Someno	(Japan) Tokyo Verdy	Loan	
15 July 2023	DF	(Japan) Keigo Tsunemoto	(Switzerland) Servette FC	Full	
15 August 2023	MF	(Japan) Ryotaro Nakamura	(Japan) Ventforet Kofu	Loan	

== Pre-season and friendlies ==
15 January Training match	Kashima Antlers	4–1	Nankatsu SC	Kashima
	Morooka; Sano; Chinen	Report	Nomura	Stadium: Kashima Antlers Practice Ground
Note: The match was played with three halves lasting 20 minutes each.

21 January Training match	Tokushima Vortis	6–3	Kashima Antlers	Miyazaki
	Watari 54'; Cacá 89'; Mori 95'; Nishino 104', 119'; Anzai 116' (o.g.)	Report	Chinen 12'; Morooka 33'; Nakama 48'	Stadium: Hinata Stadium
Note: The match was played with two halves lasting 45 minutes each, and one half lasting 30 minutes.

24 January Training match	Fagiano Okayama	5–1	Kashima Antlers	Miyazaki
13:00	Tiago Alves 18'; Sakuragawa 65'; Kimura 67'; Sakamoto 69'; Fukumoto 85'	Report	111'	Stadium: Hinata Stadium
Note: The match was played with two halves lasting 45 minutes each, and one half lasting 30 minutes.

5 February Training match	Kashima Antlers	2–1	Tokyo Verdy	Kashima
11:00	Chinen; Kakita	Report		Stadium: Kashima Soccer Stadium
Note: The match was played with four halves lasting 45 minutes each.

12 February Friendly	Mito HollyHock	2–0	Kashima Antlers	Mito
14:00	Takeda 26'; Murata 58'	Report		Stadium: K's denki Stadium Mito
Note: Ibaraki Soccer Festival

== Competitions ==
=== Overview ===
Competition	First match	Last match	Starting round	Final position	Record							
Competition	First match	Last match	Starting round	Final position	Pld	W	D	L	GF	GA	GD	Win %
J1 League	18 February 2023	3 December 2023	Matchday 1	5th	34	14	10	10	43	34	+9	41.18
J.League Cup	8 March 2023	10 September 2023	Group stage	Quarter-final	8	3	2	3	8	7	+1	37.50
Emperor's Cup	7 June 2023	12 July 2023	Second round	Third round	2	1	0	1	4	1	+3	50.00
Total					44	18	12	14	55	42	+13	40.91

Source: Competitions

=== J1 League ===
Pos	Team	Pld	W	D	L	GF	GA	GD	Pts	Qualification or relegation
3	Sanfrecce Hiroshima	34	17	7	10	42	28	+14	58	Qualification for the AFC Champions League Two group stage
4	Urawa Red Diamonds	34	15	12	7	42	27	+15	57	
5	Kashima Antlers	34	14	10	10	43	34	+9	52	
6	Nagoya Grampus	34	14	10	10	41	36	+5	52	
7	Avispa Fukuoka	34	15	6	13	37	43	−6	51	

Source: JLeague.jp, J.League Data Site
Rules for classification: 1) Points; 2) Goal difference; 3) Goals scored; 4) Head-to-head points; 5) Head-to-head goal difference; 6) Head-to-head goals scored; 7) Fewer disciplinary points.

==== Results by matchday ====
Round	1	2	3	4	5	6	7	8	9	10	11	12	13	14	15	16	17	18	19	20	21	22	23	24	25	26	27	28	29	30	31	32	33	34
Ground	A	H	A	H	A	H	A	H	A	H	A	A	H	H	A	A	H	A	H	A	A	H	A	H	H	A	H	H	A	A	H	H	A	H
Result	W	L	W	D	L	L	L	L	W	W	W	W	W	D	D	D	W	L	D	D	W	W	L	W	W	D	W	L	D	L	D	D	L	W
Position	2	6	3	4	10	13	14	15	13	9	8	5	5	4	6	8	7	7	6	6	6	5	5	5	5	6	3	5	4	6	7	6	7	5

Source: J. League Data Site
A = Away; H = Home; W = Win; D = Draw; L = Loss

==== Matches ====
The full league fixtures were released on 20 January 2023.

18 February 1	Kyoto Sanga	0–2	Kashima Antlers	Kameoka
14:00 JST	Asada (yellow card) 33'; Fukuda (yellow card) 66'	Report	Pituca 8'; Higuchi (yellow card) 21'; Chinen 34'; Suzuki (yellow card) 37'	Stadium: Sanga Stadium by Kyocera; Attendance: 15,988; Referee: Ryo Tanimoto

25 February 2	Kashima Antlers	1–2	Kawasaki Frontale	Kashima
16:00 JST	Chinen 5'; Araki (red card) 90+5'	Report	Marcinho (yellow card) 38'; Yamamura (red card) 83'; Yamada 89'; Ienaga 90+11' (pen.)	Stadium: Kashima Soccer Stadium; Attendance: 28,608; Referee: Yuichi Nishimura

4 March 3	Yokohama FC	1–3	Kashima Antlers	Yokohama
14:03 JST	Ogawa 24' (pen.); Lara (yellow card) 71'; Iwatake (yellow card) 85'	Report	Fujii 9'; Suzuki 38'; Caíke 90+6'	Stadium: Nippatsu Mitsuzawa Stadium; Attendance: 10,637; Referee: Jumpei Iida

12 March 4	Kashima Antlers	0–0	Avispa Fukuoka	Kashima
15:03 JST	Sano (yellow card) 14' (yellow-red card) 53'	Report	Kanamoro (yellow card) 41'; Grolli (yellow card) 55'; Nagaishi (yellow card) 65'; Lukian (yellow card) 80'	Stadium: Kashima Soccer Stadium; Attendance: 20,097; Referee: Yudai Yamamoto

18 March 5	Yokohama F. Marinos	2–1	Kashima Antlers	Yokohama
14:03 JST	Nishimura (yellow card) 30'; Matsubara 56'; Tsunemoto 62' (o.g.); Watanabe (yellow card) 70'	Report	Suzuki 68' (yellow card) 70'; Anzai (yellow card) 90'; Pituca (yellow card) 90+6' (yellow-red card) 90+7'	Stadium: Nissan Stadium; Attendance: 28,478; Referee: Ryo Tanimoto

1 April 6	Kashima Antlers	1–2	Sanfrecce Hiroshima	Kashima
15:03 JST	Chinen 69'	Report	Mitsuta (yellow card) 21'; Vieira 86' (pen.), 88'	Stadium: Kashima Soccer Stadium; Attendance: 15,414; Referee: Koichiro Fukushima

9 April 7	Kashiwa Reysol	1–0	Kashima Antlers	Kashiwa
19:03 JST	Hosoya 32'; Sento (yellow card) 45'; Tatsuta (yellow card) 56'; Tsuchiya (yellow card) 82'	Report	Shoji (yellow card) 58'	Stadium: Sankyo Frontier Kashiwa Stadium; Attendance: 11,421; Referee: Futoshi Nakamura

15 April 8	Kashima Antlers	1–5	Vissel Kobe	Kashima
16:03 JST	Shoji (yellow card) 60'; Suzuki 61'	Report	Osako 24', 48' (pen.) (yellow card) 40'; Hatsuse (yellow card) 31'; Muto 45+2', 85'; Sasaki 72'; Patric (yellow card) 87'	Stadium: Kashima Soccer Stadium; Attendance: 15,311; Referee: Akihiko Ikeuchi

23 April 9	Albirex Niigata	0–2	Kashima Antlers	Niigata
14:03 JST	Fitzgerald (yellow card) 77'	Report	Suzuki 3' (yellow card) 28'; Kakita 26'; Nakama (yellow card) 43'	Stadium: Denka Big Swan Stadium; Attendance: 23,920; Referee: Yudai Yamamoto

29 April 10	Kashima Antlers	4–0	Gamba Osaka	Kashima
19:03 JST	Nakama 48'; Suzuki 64'; Doi 86', 87'	Report	Kwon (yellow card) 32'; Lavi (yellow card) 90+5'	Stadium: Kashima Soccer Stadium; Attendance: 20,525; Referee: Yoshiro Imamura

3 May 11	Hokkaido Consadole Sapporo	0–1	Kashima Antlers	Sapporo
14:03 JST	Miyazawa (yellow card) 86'	Report	Suzuki 21'; Nago (yellow card) 37'; Pituca (yellow card) 76'	Stadium: Sapporo Dome; Attendance: 19,038; Referee: Takuto Okabe

7 May 12	Cerezo Osaka	0–1	Kashima Antlers	Osaka
14:03 JST	Tameda (yellow card) 4'; Toriumi (yellow card) 56'; Uejo (red card) 71'	Report	Hirose (yellow card) 1'; Sekigawa 67'	Stadium: Yodoko Sakura Stadium; Attendance: 12,676; Referee: Futoshi Nakamura

14 May 13	Kashima Antlers	2–0	Nagoya Grampus	Tokyo
13:35 JST	Suzuki 29'; Doi (yellow card) 67'; Chinen 84'; Sano (yellow card) 88'; Pituca (yellow card) 90+2'	Report		Stadium: Japan National Stadium; Attendance: 56,020; Referee: Hiroyuki Kimura

20 May 14	Kashima Antlers	1–1	FC Tokyo	Kashima
15:03 JST	Kakita 6'	Report	Oliveira 28' (pen.); Abe (yellow card) 45'; Tsukagawa (yellow card) 78'; Higashi (yellow card) 88'; Adaílton (yellow card) 90'	Stadium: Kashima Soccer Stadium; Attendance: 17,589; Referee: Ryo Tanimoto

27 May 15	Sagan Tosu	2–2	Kashima Antlers	Tosu
17:04 JST	Moriya 27'; Tashiro (yellow card) 66'; Ono 70'	Report	Nago 34'; Sano (yellow card) 77'; Higuchi (yellow card) 80'; Suzuki 90+1'	Stadium: Ekimae Real Estate Stadium; Attendance: 9,272; Referee: Yudai Yamamoto

4 June 16	Urawa Red Diamonds	0–0	Kashima Antlers	Saitama
17:04 JST	Høibråten (yellow card) 57'; Sakai (yellow card) 90+6'; Hayakawa (yellow card) 90+7'	Report	Nakama (yellow card) 84'; Hayakawa (yellow card) 90+6'; Pituca (yellow card) 90+7'	Stadium: Saitama Stadium 2002; Attendance: 45,575; Referee: Andrew Madley

11 June 17	Kashima Antlers	1–0	Shonan Bellmare	Kashima
18:00 JST	Pituca (yellow card) 23'; Higuchi 43'	Report	Onose (yellow card) 12'; Ohno (yellow card) 37'	Stadium: Kashima Soccer Stadium; Attendance: 13,169; Referee: Masuya Ueda

24 June 18	Gamba Osaka	2–1	Kashima Antlers	Osaka
19:00 JST	Kurokawa 15'; Dawhan 34'; Yamamoto (yellow card) 72'	Report	Ueda (yellow card) 59' (goal) 88'; Araki (yellow card) 65'	Stadium: Panasonic Stadium Suita; Attendance: 22,483; Referee: Futoshi Nakamura

1 July 19	Kashima Antlers	0–0	Kyoto Sanga	Kashima
18:03 JST		Report	Toyokawa (yellow card) 33'	Stadium: Kashima Soccer Stadium; Attendance: 16,353; Referee: Yusuke Araki

8 July 20	Sanfrecce Hiroshima	1–1	Kashima Antlers	Hiroshima
18:33 JST	Ben Khalifa (yellow card) 8'; Ezequiel 55' (yellow card) 78'; Morishima (yellow card) 67'	Report	Sekigawa 5'; Pituca (yellow card) 77'	Stadium: Edion Stadium Hiroshima; Attendance: 8,361; Referee: Hiroki Kasahara

16 July 21	FC Tokyo	1–3	Kashima Antlers	Chōfu
18:33 JST	Oliveira 9'; Matsuki (yellow card) 89'	Report	Suzuki 23'; Kakita 45' (yellow card) 65'; Pituca 54'; Anzai (red card) 90'	Stadium: Ajinomoto Stadium; Attendance: 37,014; Referee: Akihiko Ikeuchi

6 August 22	Kashima Antlers	3–0	Hokkaido Consadole Sapporo	Kashima
18:03 JST	Higuchi 1'; Ueda 15'; Nakama (yellow card) 30'; Sekigawa (yellow card) 51'; Suzuki 67'	Report	Supachok (yellow card) 90+1'	Stadium: Kashima Soccer Stadium; Attendance: 17,503; Referee: Koei Koya

13 August 23	Nagoya Grampus	1–0	Kashima Antlers	Toyota
18:03 JST	Nogami 37'; Inagaki (yellow card) 85'; H. Fujii (yellow card) 89'	Report	Anzai (yellow card) 28'; T. Fujii (yellow card) 90+1'; Pituca (yellow card) 90+4'	Stadium: Toyota Stadium; Attendance: 38,642; Referee: Yoshiro Imamura

19 August 24	Kashima Antlers	2–1	Sagan Tosu	Kashima
18:03 JST	Sekigawa (yellow card) 9'; Higuchi 26'; Chinen 80' (pen.); Shoji (yellow card) 90+4'	Report	Yamazaki (yellow card) 23'; Iwasaki (yellow card) 31'; Narahara 66' (yellow card) 82'; Togashi (yellow card) 72'; Hwang (yellow card) 78'	Stadium: Kashima Soccer Stadium; Attendance: 19,693; Referee: Ryo Tanimoto

26 August 25	Kashima Antlers	2–0	Albirex Niigata	Kashima
18:03 JST	Kakita 9'; Suzuki 30' (yellow card) 33'	Report	Fujiwara (yellow card) 35'	Stadium: Kashima Soccer Stadium; Attendance: 18,895; Referee: Takafumi Mikuriya

2 September 26	Shonan Bellmare	2–2	Kashima Antlers	Hiratsuka
19:03 JST	Ohashi 35' (yellow card) 63'; Suzuki 43'; Tanaka (yellow card) 59'; Yamada (yellow card) 90+5'	Report	Sano 8'; Nakama (yellow card) 28'; Caíke 90+2' (pen.)	Stadium: Lemon Gas Stadium Hiratsuka; Attendance: 11,089; Referee: Hayato Shimizu

16 September 27	Kashima Antlers	1–0	Cerezo Osaka	Kashima
18:03 JST	Suzuki 13'; Pituca (red card) 25'; Kakita (yellow card) 59'; Caíke (yellow card) 75'; Sugai (yellow card) 90+6'	Report	Capixaba (yellow card) 45+4'	Stadium: Kashima Soccer Stadium; Attendance: 18,380; Referee: Takuto Okabe

24 September 28	Kashima Antlers	1–2	Yokohama F. Marinos	Kashima
15:04 JST	Nakama (yellow card) 6'; Suzuki 15' (yellow card) 41'; Hirose (yellow card) 24'	Report	Lopes 34', 50'; Nagato (yellow card) 45'	Stadium: Kashima Soccer Stadium; Attendance: 27,463; Referee: Futoshi Nakamura

30 September 29	Avispa Fukuoka	0–0	Kashima Antlers	Fukuoka
15:03 JST	Grolli (yellow card) 5'; Konno (yellow card) 35'; Miya (yellow card) 85'; Oda (yellow card) 89'	Report		Stadium: Best Denki Stadium; Attendance: 9,467; Referee: Hajime Matsuo

21 October 30	Vissel Kobe	3–1	Kashima Antlers	Tokyo
14:03 JST	Sasaki 16', 83'; Ide 45'	Report	Matsumura 90+1'	Stadium: Japan National Stadium; Attendance: 53,444; Referee: Koichiro Fukushima

28 October 31	Kashima Antlers	0–0	Urawa Red Diamonds	Kashima
14:03 JST		Report	Takahashi (yellow card) 49'; Sakai (yellow card) 66'; Scholz (yellow card) 67'; Akimoto (yellow card) 88'	Stadium: Kashima Soccer Stadium; Attendance: 29,305; Referee: Hiroyuki Kimura

11 November 32	Kashima Antlers	1–1	Kashiwa Reysol	Kashima
15:03 JST	Pituca 87' (pen.)	Report	Koga (yellow card) 54'; Takamine (yellow card) 74'; Hosoya 77'; Diego (yellow card) 89'	Stadium: Kashima Soccer Stadium; Attendance: 19,860; Referee: Ryo Tanimoto

24 November 33	Kawasaki Frontale	3–0	Kashima Antlers	Kawasaki
19:03 JST	Damião 34', 63'; Wakizaka 84' (pen.); Kobayashi (yellow card) 90'	Report	Sano (yellow card) 78'; Hayakawa (yellow card) 82'	Stadium: Kawasaki Todoroki Stadium; Attendance: 20,887; Referee: Hiroki Kasahara

3 December 34	Kashima Antlers	2–1	Yokohama FC	Kashima
14:03 JST	Suzuki 18'; Matsumura 41'; Pituca (yellow card) 51'; Sano (yellow card) 56'	Report	Caprini (yellow card) 44' (goal) 63'; Mita (yellow card) 64'	Stadium: Kashima Soccer Stadium; Attendance: 20,336; Referee: Yuichi Nishimura

=== Emperor's Cup ===
As a J1 club, Kashima entered the competition at the second round.

7 June Second round	Kashima Antlers	3–0	Honda FC	Kashima
19:03	Kim 13'; Caíke 39'; Someno 68'	Report	Kishida (yellow card) 80'	Stadium: Kashima Soccer Stadium; Attendance: 3,837; Referee: Yoshimi Yamashita

12 July Third round	Kashima Antlers	1–1 (a.e.t.) (10–11 p)	Ventforet Kofu	Kōfu
19:05	Kakita 62'	Report	Nozawa 51'	Stadium: JIT Recycle Ink Stadium; Attendance: 6,301; Referee: Hiroyuki Kimura
	Penalties
	Pituca (penalty scored); Higuchi (penalty missed); Doi (penalty scored); Sekigawa (penalty scored); Nakama (penalty missed); Anzai (penalty scored); Matsumura (penalty scored); Ueda (penalty scored); Shoji (penalty scored); Oki (penalty scored); Suzuki (penalty scored); Pituca (penalty scored); Higuchi (penalty missed)		(penalty scored) Sugai; (penalty missed) Getúlio; (penalty scored) Hasegawa; (penalty scored) Utaka; (penalty missed) Mancha; (penalty scored) Nozawa; (penalty scored) Shinada; (penalty scored) Hasukawa; (penalty scored) Matsumoto; (penalty scored) Kobayashi; (penalty scored) Shibuya; (penalty scored) Sugai; (penalty scored) Getúlio

=== J.League Cup ===
Pos	Team	Pld	W	D	L	GF	GA	GD	Pts	Qualification
1	Avispa Fukuoka	6	4	1	1	9	6	+3	13	Advance to knockout stage
2	Kashima Antlers	6	3	1	2	6	4	+2	10	Advance to knockout stage
3	Albirex Niigata	6	2	0	4	6	8	−2	6	
4	Kashiwa Reysol	6	1	2	3	7	10	−3	5	

Source: JLeague.co (EN), JLeague.jp (JA)
Rules for classification: Tiebreakers

8 March 1	Kashiwa Reysol	1–1	Kashima Antlers	Kashiwa
19:03 JST	Toshima (yellow card) 57'; Shiihashi (yellow card) 83'; Hosoya 90'	Report	Matsumura 22'; Sekigawa (yellow card) 45+3'; Nago (yellow card) 87'	Stadium: Sankyo Frontier Kashiwa Stadium; Attendance: 6,674; Referee: Takuto Okabe

26 March 2	Albirex Niigata	1–0	Kashima Antlers	Niigata
14:03 JST	Akiyama 52'	Report	Tsunemoto (yellow card) 44'; Pituca (yellow card) 73'	Stadium: Denka Big Swan Stadium; Attendance: 12,294; Referee: Yoshimi Yamashita

5 April 3	Kashima Antlers	1–0	Avispa Fukuoka	Kashima
19:00 JST	Araki 32'	Report	Grolli (yellow card) 63'	Stadium: Kashima Soccer Stadium; Attendance: 5,571; Referee: Hayato Shimizu

19 April 4	Avispa Fukuoka	2–1	Kashima Antlers	Fukuoka
19:03 JST	Jogo 14'; Grolli (yellow card) 85'; Wellington 90+3'	Report	Caíke 31'; Sekigawa (yellow card) 90'	Stadium: Best Denki Stadium; Attendance: 3,520; Referee: Masuya Ueda

24 May 5	Kashima Antlers	1–0	Kashiwa Reysol	Kashima
19:10 JST	Caíke 68'; Kim (yellow card) 73'	Report		Stadium: Kashima Soccer Stadium; Attendance: 6,134; Referee: Yuichi Nishimura

18 June 6	Kashima Antlers	2–0	Albirex Niigata	Kashima
18:03 JST	Nakama 3'; Someno 12'	Report	Nescau (yellow card) 67'	Stadium: Kashima Soccer Stadium; Attendance: 9,652; Referee: Akihiko Ikeuchi

==== Quarter-finals ====
6 September Leg 1	Nagoya Grampus	1–1	Kashima Antlers	Toyota
19:33 JST	Fujii (yellow card) 27'; Nakatani (yellow card) 42'; Junker (yellow card) 50'; Inagaki (yellow card) 53'; Kubo 90+4'	Report	Matsumura 49'	Stadium: Toyota Stadium; Attendance: 8,089; Referee: Yudai Yamamoto

10 September Leg 2	Kashima Antlers	1–2 (a.e.t.)	Nagoya Grampus	Kashima
18:03 JST	Nakama 51' (yellow card) 62'; Pituca (yellow card) 15'	Report	Nakashima 3' (yellow card) 12'; Nagai (yellow card) 41'; Uchida (yellow card) 78'; Yoshida 119'	Stadium: Kashima Soccer Stadium; Attendance: 14,310; Referee: Yuichi Nishimura

Nagoya Grampus won 3–2 on aggregate.

== Statistics ==
=== Appearances ===
Squad players with no appearances throughout the season are not listed.

No.	Pos.	Name	J1 League		Emperor's Cup		J.League Cup		Total	
No.	Pos.	Name	Apps	Goals	Apps	Goals	Apps	Goals	Apps	Goals
Goalkeepers
29	GK	(Japan) Tomoki Hayakawa	34	0	0	0	2	0	36	0
31	GK	(Japan) Yuya Oki	0	0	2	0	6	0	8	0
Defenders
2	DF	(Japan) Koki Anzai	31	0	1	0	4+3	0	39	0
3	DF	(Japan) Gen Shoji	4+17	0	2	0	3+1	1	27	0
5	DF	(Japan) Ikuma Sekigawa	30	2	0+1	0	5+1	0	37	2
16	DF	(Japan) Hidehiro Sugai	4+4	0	0	0	0+1	0	9	0
22	DF	(Japan) Rikuto Hirose	20+7	0	1	0	4+3	0	35	0
28	DF	(Japan) Shuhei Mizoguchi	4+1	0	1	0	5	0	11	0
55	DF	(Japan) Naomichi Ueda	34	2	1	0	5+1	0	41	2
Midfielders
8	MF	(Japan) Shoma Doi	7+17	2	0+2	0	2+5	0	33	2
10	MF	(Japan) Ryotaro Araki	3+10	0	2	0	5	1	20	1
14	MF	(Japan) Yuta Higuchi	31+2	3	0+1	0	2+1	0	37	3
15	MF	(Japan) Tomoya Fujii	9+13	1	1+1	0	2+3	0	29	1
17	MF	(Brazil) Arthur Caíke	0+13	2	1	1	3+1	2	18	5
20	MF	(Japan) Gaku Shibasaki	1+2	0	0	0	0+1	0	4	0
21	MF	(Brazil) Diego Pituca	31	3	1	0	5	0	37	3
25	MF	(Japan) Kaishu Sano	23+4	1	1	0	5+2	0	35	1
27	MF	(Japan) Yuta Matsumura	5+15	2	0+1	0	3+2	2	26	4
30	MF	(Japan) Shintaro Nago	9+5	1	1	0	1+2	0	17	1
33	MF	(Japan) Hayato Nakama	20+7	1	1+1	0	4+2	2	35	3
34	MF	(Japan) Yu Funabashi	0+8	0	1	0	2	0	11	0
Forwards
13	FW	(Japan) Kei Chinen	11+10	5	0	0	1+3	0	25	5
19	FW	(Nigeria) Blessing Eleke	0+2	0	0	0	0	0	2	0
36	FW	(Japan) Shu Morooka	1+3	0	0+1	0	2+2	0	9	0
37	FW	(Japan) Yuki Kakita	19+10	4	1	1	3+1	0	34	5
40	FW	(Japan) Yuma Suzuki	33	14	0+1	0	3+4	0	41	14
Players loaned or transferred out during the season
20	DF	(South Korea) Kim Min-tae	0	0	1	1	3+1	0	5	1
32	DF	(Japan) Keigo Tsunemoto	9+7	0	1	0	3	0	20	0
35	MF	(Japan) Ryotaro Nakamura	0+3	0	1	0	3	0	7	0
18	FW	(Japan) Itsuki Someno	1+4	0	1	1	2+1	1	9	2

Last updated: 3 December 2023.
Source: jleague.co, Soccer D.B.

=== Goalscorers ===
The list is sorted by shirt number when total goals are equal.

Rnk	Pos	No.	Player	J1	EC	JLC	Total
1	FW	40	(Japan) Yuma Suzuki	14	0	0	14
2	FW	13	(Japan) Kei Chinen	5	0	0	5
2	MF	17	(Brazil) Arthur Caíke	2	1	2	5
2	FW	37	(Japan) Yuki Kakita	4	1	0	5
5	MF	27	(Japan) Yuta Matsumura	2	0	2	4
6	MF	14	(Japan) Yuta Higuchi	3	0	0	3
6	MF	21	(Brazil) Diego Pituca	3	0	0	3
6	MF	33	(Japan) Hayato Nakama	1	0	2	3
9	DF	5	(Japan) Ikuma Sekigawa	2	0	0	2
9	FW	8	(Japan) Shoma Doi	2	0	0	2
9	FW	18	(Japan) Itsuki Someno	0	1	1	2
9	DF	55	(Japan) Naomichi Ueda	2	0	0	2
13	MF	10	(Japan) Ryotaro Araki	0	0	1	1
13	MF	15	(Japan) Tomoya Fujii	1	0	0	1
13	DF	20	(South Korea) Kim Min-tae	0	1	0	1
13	MF	25	(Japan) Kaishu Sano	1	0	0	1
13	MF	30	(Japan) Shintaro Nago	1	0	0	1
TOTAL				43	4	8	55

Last updated: 3 December 2023.
Source: jleague.co

=== Clean sheets ===
The list is sorted by shirt number when total clean sheets are equal.

Rnk	No.	Player	J1	EC	JLC	Total
1	29	(Japan) Tomoki Hayakawa	15	0	0	15
2	31	(Japan) Yuya Oki	0	1	3	4
TOTALS			15	1	3	19

Last updated: 28 October 2023.
Source: fbref.com
