= 2026 Kashima Antlers season =

Kashima Antlers
2026 season
- Chairman: Fumiaki Koizumi
- Manager: Toru Oniki
- Stadium: Kashima Soccer Stadium
- J1 League: 6th
- Average home league attendance: 27,769
Home colours	Away colours

The 2026 season is Kashima Antlers' 80th season in existence.

== Squad ==
=== Season squad ===
Squad no.	Name	Nationality	Date of birth	Previous club
Goalkeepers
1	Tomoki Hayakawa	(Japan)	3 March 1999 (age 27)	(Japan) Meiji University
21	Taiki Yamada	(Japan)	8 January 2002 (age 24)	(Japan) Fagiano Okayama
29	Yuji Kajikawa	(Japan)	26 July 1991 (age 35)	(Japan) Júbilo Iwata
38	Haruto Fujii	(Japan)	5 June 2003 (age 23)	(Japan) Meiji University
Defenders
2	Koki Anzai	(Japan)	31 May 1995 (age 31)	(Portugal) Portimonense
3	Kim Tae-hyeon	(South Korea)	17 September 2000 (age 26)	(Japan) Sagan Tosu
4	Kaito Chida	(Japan)	17 October 1994 (age 32)	(Japan) Tokyo Verdy
5	Ikuma Sekigawa	(Japan)	13 September 2000 (age 26)	(Japan) RKU Kashiwa High School
7	Ryoya Ogawa	(Japan)	24 November 1996 (age 29)	(Belgium) Sint-Truidense
16	Shuhei Mizoguchi	(Japan)	13 February 2004 (age 22)	Youth Team
22	Kimito Nono	(Japan)	26 February 2002 (age 24)	(Japan) Kwansei Gakuin University
23	Keisuke Tsukui	(Japan)	21 May 2004 (age 22)	(Japan) Shohei High School
25	Ryuta Koike	(Japan)	29 August 1995 (age 31)	(Japan) Yokohama F. Marinos
28	Yugo Okawa	(Japan)	14 July 2007 (age 19)	Youth Team
32	Haruto Matsumoto	(Japan)	29 September 2006 (age 20)	Youth Team
55	Naomichi Ueda	(Japan)	24 October 1994 (age 32)	(France) Nimes
Midfielders
6	Kento Misao	(Japan)	16 April 1996 (age 30)	(Belgium) OH Leuven
10	Gaku Shibasaki (c)	(Japan)	28 May 1992 (age 34)	(Spain) CD Leganés
13	Kei Chinen	(Japan)	17 March 1995 (age 31)	(Japan) Kawasaki Frontale
14	Yuta Higuchi	(Japan)	30 October 1996 (age 30)	(Japan) Sagan Tosu
20	Yu Funabashi	(Japan)	12 July 2002 (age 24)	Youth Team
24	Haruki Hayashi	(Japan)	5 December 2003 (age 22)	(Japan) Meiji University
27	Yūta Matsumura	(Japan)	13 April 2001 (age 25)	(Japan) Tokyo Verdy
71	Ryōtarō Araki	(Japan)	29 January 2002 (age 24)	(Japan) FC Tokyo
Forwards
9	Léo Ceará	(Brazil)	3 February 1995 (age 31)	(Japan) Cerezo Osaka
11	Kyosuke Tagawa	(Japan)	11 February 1999 (age 27)	(Scotland) Heart
17	Élber	(Brazil)	27 May 1992 (age 34)	(Japan) Yokohama F. Marinos
19	Shu Morooka	(Japan)	9 December 2000 (age 25)	(Japan) Tokyo International University
30	Minato Yoshida ^{Type 2}	(Japan)	15 July 2008 (age 18)	Youth Team
34	Homare Tokuda	(Japan)	18 February 2007 (age 19)	Youth Team
40	Yuma Suzuki	(Japan)	28 April 1996 (age 30)	(Belgium) Sint-Truidense
77	Aleksandar Čavrić	(Serbia)	18 May 1994 (age 32)	(Slovenia) Slovan Bratislava
Players who left on loan
33	Yoshiro Shimoda (M)	(Japan)	5 May 2004 (age 22)	(Japan) Iwaki FC
36	Mihiro Sato (D)	(Japan)	26 February 2007 (age 19)	Youth Team

Last updated: 18 August 2025.
Source: Kashima Antlers website

== Friendly ==
=== Tour of Miyazaki (19 Jan - 29 Jan) ===
17 January 1	Fukuoka University	2–10	Kashima Antlers	Miyazaki
				Stadium: Miyazaki Athletic Stadium

20 January 2	Fagiano Okayama	–	Kashima Antlers	Miyazaki
				Stadium: Miyazaki Athletic Stadium

24 January 3	Avispa Fukuoka	–	Kashima Antlers	Miyazaki
				Stadium: Miyazaki Athletic Stadium

== Transfers ==
=== In ===
Pre-season

Date	Position	Player	Transferred from	Ref
Permanent Transfer
23 December 2025	GK	(Japan) Haruto Fujii	(Japan) Meiji University	Free
29 December 2025	DF	(Japan) Naoki Sutoh	(Japan) Kochi United	End of loan
Loan Transfer

Post-season

Date	Position	Player	Transferred from	Ref
Permanent Transfer
30 June 2026	DF	(Japan) Mihiro Sato	(Japan) Albirex Niigata	End of loan
30 June 2026	MF	(Japan) Yoshihiro Shimoda	(Japan) Tochigi City	End of loan
June 2026	FW	(Brazil) Matheus Bueno	(Japan) Shimizu S-Pulse	Undisclosed
June 2026	FW	(Japan) Shōya Nakajima	(Japan) Urawa Red Diamonds	Free
Loan Transfer

=== Out ===
Pre-season

Date	Position	Player	Transferred To	Ref
Permanent Transfer
20 December 2025	FW	(Brazil) Talles	(Ukraine) Rukh Lviv	End of loan
23 December 2025	GK	(South Korea) Park Eui-jeong	(South Korea) Hwaseong FC	Free
29 December 2025	DF	(Japan) Naoki Sutoh	(Australia) Preston Lions	Free
Loan Transfer
29 December 2025	DF	(Japan) Mihiro Sato	(Japan) Albirex Niigata	Season loan
29 December 2025	MF	(Japan) Yoshihiro Shimoda	(Japan) Tochigi City	Season loan

Post-season

Date	Position	Player	Transferred to	Ref
Permanent Transfer
June 2026	FW	(Japan) Shu Morooka	(Japan) Avispa Fukuoka	Undisclosed
June 2026	FW	(Japan) Kei Chinen	(Japan) JEF United Chiba / Yokohama F. Marinos	Undisclosed
Loan Transfer

== Competitions ==
=== J1 League ===
Pos	Team	Pld	W	PKW	PKL	L	GF	GA	GD	Pts	Qualification
1	Kashima Antlers	18	13	2	2	1	29	9	+20	45	Final
2	FC Tokyo	18	9	4	2	3	28	16	+12	37	3rd–4th place playoff
3	Machida Zelvia	18	8	5	3	2	23	19	+4	37	5th–6th place playoff
4	Kawasaki Frontale	18	7	3	1	7	23	27	−4	28	7th–8th place playoff
5	Tokyo Verdy	18	7	3	1	7	19	25	−6	28	9th–10th place playoff
6	Urawa Red Diamonds	18	7	0	4	7	25	18	+7	25	11th–12th place playoff
7	Yokohama F. Marinos	18	6	0	2	10	28	29	−1	20	13th–14th place playoff
8	Kashiwa Reysol	18	6	1	0	11	21	24	−3	20	15th–16th place playoff
9	Mito HollyHock	18	2	4	4	8	19	35	−16	18	17th–18th place playoff
10	JEF United Chiba	18	3	0	3	12	18	31	−13	12	19th–20th place playoff

Source: JLeague.co, J.League Data Site
Rules for classification: 1) Points; 2) Goal difference; 3) Goals scored; 4) Head-to-head.

==== Matches ====
7 February 1	FC Tokyo	1–1 (5–4 p)	Kashima Antlers	Chōfu
	Keita Endo 44'; Hayato Inamura (yellow card) 34'	Report	Kim Tae Hyeon 45+1'; Kento Misao (red card) 41'; Yuma Suzuki (yellow card) 58'; Kei Chinen (yellow card) 60'	Stadium: Ajinomoto Stadium; Referee: Futoshi Nakamura
	Penalties
	Alexander Scholz (penalty scored); Kento Hashimoto (penalty scored); Fūki Yamada (penalty scored); Kento Hashimoto (penalty scored); Ryunosuke Sato (penalty scored)		Aleksandar Čavrić (penalty scored); Naomichi Ueda (penalty scored); Kim Tae Hyeon (penalty scored); Ryuta Koike (penalty missed); Léo Ceará (penalty scored)

14 February 2	Kashima Antlers	1–0	Yokohama F. Marinos	Kashima
	Léo Ceará 76'; Kei Chinen (yellow card) 61'	Report	Jeisson Quinones (yellow card) 19'	Stadium: Kashima Soccer Stadium; Attendance: 31,091; Referee: Akihiko Ikeuchi

21 February 3	Kashima Antlers	2–0	Kashiwa Reysol	Kashima
	Léo Ceará 36'; Naomichi Ueda 53'	Report	Nobuteru Nakagawa (yellow card) 35'; Yōta Komi (yellow card) 69'	Stadium: Kashima Soccer Stadium; Attendance: 25,993; Referee: Hiroyuki Kimura

28 February 4	Urawa Red Diamonds	2–3	Kashima Antlers	Saitama
	Hidano Renji 14'; Ryoma Watanabe 19'; Matheus Savio (yellow card) 47'; Yuta Higuchi (yellow card) 74'	Report	Léo Ceará 45' (pen.); Yuma Suzuki 55'; Aleksandar Cavric 90'	Stadium: Saitama Stadium 2002; Attendance: 52,841; Referee: Koei Koya

7 March 5	Kashima Antlers	2–0	Tokyo Verdy	Kashima
	Yuma Suzuki 26', 45+5'	Report	Kazuya Miyahara (yellow card) 66'	Stadium: Kashima Soccer Stadium; Attendance: 19,298; Referee: Futoshi Nakamura

14 March 6	Kashima Antlers	1–0	Kawasaki Frontale	Kashima
	Léo Ceará 79'; Kyosuke Tagawa (yellow card) 90'	Report		Stadium: Kashima Soccer Stadium; Attendance: 24,916; Referee: Atsushi Kamimura

18 March 7	Machida Zelvia	0–3	Kashima Antlers	Tokyo
	Yūta Nakayama (yellow card) 42'; Na Sang-ho (yellow card) 45+2'	Report	Yuma Suzuki 5'; Kento Misao 45'; Aleksandar Čavrić 90'	Stadium: Machida GION Stadium; Attendance: 42,218; Referee: Koichiro Fukushima

22 March 8	Kashima Antlers	2–1	JEF United Chiba	Kashima
	Elber 4'; Naomichi Ueda 84'; Ikuma Sekigawa (yellow card) 35'	Report	Zain Issaka 70'; Yusuke Kobayashi (yellow card) 65'	Stadium: Kashima Soccer Stadium; Attendance: 27,758; Referee: Hiroki Kasahara

4 April 9	Mito HollyHock	1–1 (4–2 p)	Kashima Antlers	Ibaraki
	Arata Watanabe 35'; Danilo Cardoso (yellow card) 30' (yellow-red card) 67'; Ryo Nemoto (yellow card) 78'	Report	Léo Ceará 90+6' (pen.); Shuhei Mizoguchi (yellow card) 75'; Kimito Nono (yellow card) 90'	Stadium: K's denki Stadium Mito; Attendance: 10,570; Referee: Koei Koya
	Penalties
	Koshi Osaki (penalty scored); Ryo Nemoto (penalty scored); Tada Keisuke (penalty scored); Yamamota Hayata (penalty scored)		Kei Chinen (penalty missed); Naomichi Ueda (penalty missed); Yuma Suzuki (penalty scored); Kyosuke Tagawa (penalty scored)

12 April 10	Kawasaki Frontale	0–2	Kashima Antlers	Kawasaki
	Sota Miura (yellow card) 65'	Report	Yuma Suzuki 53' (pen.); Léo Ceará 65'; Yūta Matsumura (yellow card) 68'; Haruki Hayashi (yellow card) 90+5'	Stadium: Kawasaki Todoroki Stadium; Attendance: 23,094; Referee: Yuzo Sutani

18 April 11	Kashima Antlers	1–0	Urawa Red Diamonds	Kashima
	Kimito Nono 82'; Toru Okini (yellow card) 90+2'	Report	Kai Shibato (yellow card) 62'; Matheus Savio (yellow card) 73'	Stadium: Kashima Soccer Stadium; Attendance: 28,777; Referee: Masuya Ueda

24 April 12	Kashiwa Reysol	0–1	Kashima Antlers	Chiba
	Hiromu Mitsumaru (yellow card) 33'; Yoshio Koizumi (yellow card) 68'	Report	Yuma Suzuki 45+1'; Koki Anzai (yellow card) 49'; Kimito Nono (yellow card) 68'; Keisuke Tsukui (red card) 89'	Stadium: Sankyo Frontier Kashiwa Stadium; Attendance: 13,132; Referee: Takafumi Mikuriya

29 April 13	Tokyo Verdy	2–1	Kashima Antlers	Chōfu
	Issei Kumatoriya 35'; Taiju Yoshida 40'; Yuta Arai (yellow card) 76'	Report	Kimito Nono 20'; Kento Misao (yellow card) 43' (yellow-red card) 71'	Stadium: Ajinomoto Stadium; Attendance: 28,105; Referee: Yusuke Ohashi

3 May 14	Kashima Antlers	1–1 (4–2 p)	Machida Zelvia	Kashima
	Léo Ceará 50'	Report	Tete Yengi 53' (yellow card) 41'; Neta Lavi (yellow card) 49'; Kotaro Hayashi (yellow card) 56'; Hiroyuki Mae (yellow card) 90+4'	Stadium: Kashima Soccer Stadium; Attendance: 31,742; Referee: Akihiko Ikeuchi
	Penalties
	Kyosuke Tagawa (penalty scored); Yuma Suzuki (penalty scored); Ryoya Ogawa (penalty scored); Léo Ceará (penalty scored)		Hokuto Shimoda (penalty missed); Ibrahim Drešević (penalty scored); Kosei Tani (penalty scored); Hiroyuki Mae (penalty missed)

6 May 15	Kashima Antlers	3–0	Mito HollyHock	Kashima
	Shu Morooka 58'; Léo Ceará 70', 79'; Kim Tae-hyeon (yellow card) 19'	Report	Takeshi Ushizawa (red card) 33'	Stadium: Kashima Soccer Stadium; Attendance: 32,274; Referee: Jumpei Iida

10 May 16	Yokohama F. Marinos	1–1 (2–4 p)	Kashima Antlers	Yokohama
	Kaina Tanimura 58'	Report	Léo Ceará 90+5'	Stadium: Nissan Stadium; Attendance: 32,182; Referee: Yuzo Sutani
	Penalties
	Taisei Inoue (penalty scored); Dean David (penalty scored); Ryo Miyachi (penalty missed); Kota Watanabe (penalty missed)		Aleksandar Čavrić (penalty scored); Yuma Suzuki (penalty scored); Léo Ceará (penalty scored); Naomichi Ueda (penalty scored)

17 May 17	JEF United Chiba	0–2	Kashima Antlers	Chiba
	Carlinhos Junior (yellow card) 45+2' (yellow-red card) 60'; Zain Issaka (yellow card) 52'	Report	Ryotaro Araki 42'; Shu Morooka 87'	Stadium: Fukuda Denshi Arena; Attendance: 17,754; Referee: Ryo Tanimoto

23 May 18	Kashima Antlers	1–0	FC Tokyo	Kashima
	Shu Morooka 78'; Yuma Suzuki (yellow card) 89'	Report	Sei Muroya (yellow card) 40'	Stadium: Kashima Soccer Stadium; Attendance: 28,073; Referee: Hiroyuki Kimura

30 May Placement Leg 1	Vissel Kobe	5–0	Kashima Antlers	Kobe
	Yuya Osako 27', 49', 90+4'; Diego 69'; Ren Komatsu 88' (pen.); Gōtoku Sakai (yellow card) 45+1'	Report	Gaku Shibasaki (yellow card) 55'	Stadium: Noevir Stadium Kobe; Attendance: 24,431; Referee: Akihiko Ikeuchi

6 June Placement Leg 2	Kashima Antlers	2–0 (2–5 agg.)	Vissel Kobe	Kashima
	Haruki Hayashi 68'; Koki Anzai 70'; Kei Chinen (yellow card) 68'; Yuta Higuchi (yellow card) 87'; Ikuma Sekigawa (yellow card) 90+1'	Report		Stadium: Kashima Soccer Stadium; Attendance: 29,826; Referee: Koichiro Fukushima

== Team statistics ==
=== Appearances and goals ===
As of 6 June 2026

No.	Pos.	Player	J1 League		Total	
No.	Pos.	Player	Apps	Goals	Apps	Goals
1	GK	(Japan) Tomoki Hayakawa	17	0	17	0
2	DF	(Japan) Koki Anzai	9+1	1	10	1
3	DF	(South Korea) Kim Tae-hyeon	15	1	15	1
4	DF	(Japan) Kaito Chida	0	0	0	0
5	DF	(Japan) Ikuma Sekigawa	5+1	0	6	0
6	MF	(Japan) Kento Misao	17+1	1	18	1
7	DF	(Japan) Ryoya Ogawa	3+8	0	11	0
9	FW	(Brazil) Léo Ceará	20	9	20	9
10	MF	(Japan) Gaku Shibasaki	9+6	0	15	0
11	FW	(Japan) Kyosuke Tagawa	4+5	0	9	0
13	MF	(Japan) Kei Chinen	5+10	0	15	0
14	MF	(Japan) Yuta Higuchi	10+4	0	14	0
16	DF	(Japan) Shuhei Mizoguchi	7+1	0	8	0
17	FW	(Brazil) Élber	7	1	7	1
19	FW	(Japan) Shu Morooka	3+8	3	11	3
20	MF	(Japan) Yu Funabashi	0	0	0	0
21	GK	(Japan) Taiki Yamada	0	0	0	0
22	DF	(Japan) Kimito Nono	18+1	2	19	2
23	DF	(Japan) Keisuke Tsukui	0+4	0	4	0
24	MF	(Japan) Haruki Hayashi	1+17	1	18	1
25	DF	(Japan) Ryuta Koike	3+4	0	7	0
27	MF	(Japan) Yūta Matsumura	12+5	0	17	0
28	DF	(Japan) Yugo Okawa	0	0	0	0
29	GK	(Japan) Yuji Kajikawa	3	0	3	0
30	FW	(Japan) Minato Yoshida	0+1	0	1	0
32	DF	(Japan) Haruto Matsumoto	0+1	0	1	0
34	FW	(Japan) Homare Tokuda	0+3	0	3	0
38	GK	(Japan) Haruto Fujii	0	0	0	0
40	FW	(Japan) Yuma Suzuki	19+1	5	20	5
55	DF	(Japan) Naomichi Ueda	20	1	20	1
71	MF	(Japan) Ryōtarō Araki	6+5	1	11	1
77	FW	(Serbia) Aleksandar Čavrić	8+8	2	16	2
