= Kaishū Sano =

Japanese footballer (born 2000)

Kaishu Sano
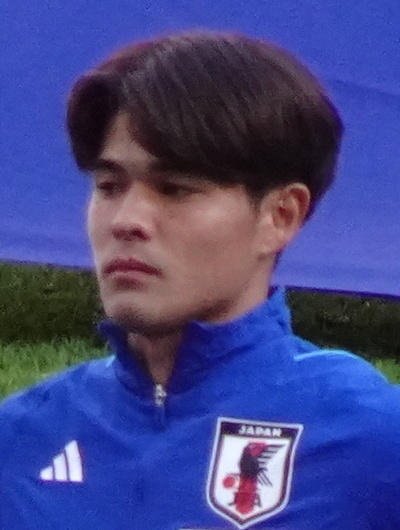
- Sano in 2024

Personal information
- Date of birth: 30 December 2000 (age 25)
- Place of birth: Tsuyama, Okayama, Japan
- Height: 1.76 m (5 ft 9 in)
- Position: Defensive midfielder

Team information
- Current team: Mainz 05
- Number: 6

Youth career
- 2007–2015: FC Viparte
- 2016–2018: Yonago Kita High School

Senior career*
Years	Team	Apps	(Gls)
2019–2022	Machida Zelvia	116	(8)
2023–2024	Kashima Antlers	47	(1)
2024–	Mainz 05	76	(1)

International career^{‡}
2023–	Japan	20	(1)
- * Club domestic league appearances and goals as of 22:30, 30 October 2026 (UTC) ‡ National team caps and goals as of 12:30, 14 November 2026 (UTC)

Kaishu Sano (佐野 海舟, Sano Kaishū; born 30 December 2000) is a Japanese professional footballer who plays as a defensive midfielder for Bundesliga club Mainz 05 and the Japan national team.

== Club career ==
After four seasons with J2 League club Machida Zelvia, in December 2022 it was announced that Sano would be joining J1 League club Kashima Antlers for the 2023 season.

Sano appeared as starter at the beginning of the season, appearing in nine of their first ten games. In April, he picked up a knee injury which would leave him out of action for four weeks.

=== Mainz 05 ===
On 3 July 2024, Sano signed for Bundesliga club Mainz 05 on a four-year contract for an undisclosed fee.

== International career ==
On 15 May 2026, Sano was selected in the 26-man squad for the 2026 FIFA World Cup. On 29 June 2026, Sano scored his first international goal by opening the scoreline against Brazil in the round of 32 of the 2026 FIFA World Cup.

== Personal life ==
Sano is the elder brother of fellow professional footballer Kodai Sano.

== Controversies ==
On 17 July 2024, following Sano's transfer to Mainz, it was reported that he was arrested along with two other co-suspects under suspicion of sexually assaulting a woman who had earlier dined with the three men after the woman's friend had left for home. He was released on 29 July, and prosecutors decided not to indict him on 8 August.

On 5 June 2025, he was selected for the Japan national team for the third round of the 2026 FIFA World Cup Asian qualifiers, scheduled to be held on 10 June, marking his return to the squad. At a press conference, head coach Hajime Moriyasu stated, "I have been observing him all along, and after personally reaching out to him, I strongly felt that he is truly remorseful." He continued, "When we consider each team member as part of a family, I asked myself—as a coach facing an individual player—whether we should simply cast someone out of society or the football world for making a mistake. I decided it would be better, as a family, to give him a path to try again." Sano also held a press conference on 28 June, where he offered a direct apology in his own words.

== Career statistics ==
=== Club ===
As of match played 30 October 2026

Appearances and goals by club, season and competition
Club	Season	League			National cup (Note: Includes Emperor's Cup, DFB-Pokal)		League cup (Note: Includes J. League Cup)		Continental		Total	
Club	Season	Division	Apps	Goals	Apps	Goals	Apps	Goals	Apps	Goals	Apps	Goals
Machida Zelvia	2019	J2 League	21	0	1	0	–		–		22	0
Machida Zelvia	2020	J2 League	41	1	0	0	–		–		41	1
Machida Zelvia	2021	J2 League	34	6	1	0	–		–		35	6
Machida Zelvia	2022	J2 League	20	1	1	0	–		–		21	1
Machida Zelvia	Total		116	7	3	0	0	0	–		119	7
Kashima Antlers	2023	J1 League	27	1	1	0	7	0	–		35	1
Kashima Antlers	2024	J1 League	20	0	1	0	2	0	–		23	0
Kashima Antlers	Total		47	1	2	0	9	0	–		58	1
Mainz 05	2024–25	Bundesliga	34	0	2	0	–		–		36	0
Mainz 05	2025–26	Bundesliga	34	1	2	0	–		11 (Note: Appearances in UEFA Conference League)	1	47	2
Mainz 05	2026–27	Bundesliga	8	0	2	0	–		–		10	0
Mainz 05	Total		76	1	6	0	–		11	1	93	2
Career total			239	9	11	0	9	0	11	1	270	10

=== International ===
As of match played 14 November 2026

Appearances and goals by national team and year
National team	Year	Apps	Goals
Japan	2023	1	0
Japan	2024	4	0
Japan	2025	7	0
Japan	2026	8	1
Total		20	1

Japan score listed first, score column indicates score after each Sano goal.

List of international goals scored by Kaishū Sano
No.	Date	Venue	Cap	Opponent	Score	Result	Competition
1	29 June 2026	NRG Stadium, Houston, United States	16	Brazil	1–0	1–2	2026 FIFA World Cup

== Honours ==
Individual

- IFFHS Asian Men's Team of the Year: 2025
