= Aleksandar Čavrić =

Serbian footballer (born 1994)

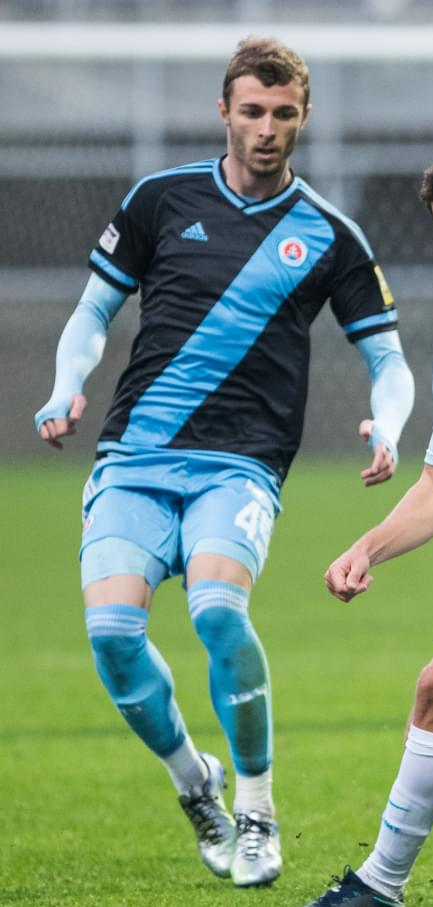
- Čavrić with Slovan Bratislava in 2018

Personal information
- Date of birth: 18 May 1994 (age 32)
- Place of birth: Vukovar, Croatia
- Height: 1.87 m (6 ft 2 in)
- Positions: Forward; winger

Team information
- Current team: Kashima Antlers
- Number: 77

Youth career
- Proleter Zrenjanin
- Banat Zrenjanin

Senior career*
Years	Team	Apps	(Gls)
2011–2012	Banat Zrenjanin	11	(1)
2012–2014	OFK Beograd	54	(14)
2014–2016	Genk	18	(0)
2015–2016	→ Aarhus (loan)	19	(1)
2016–2024	Slovan Bratislava	181	(52)
2024	→ Kashima Antlers (loan)	25	(7)
2025–	Kashima Antlers	48	(7)

International career
2011–2013	Serbia U19	13	(1)
2014–2017	Serbia U21	23	(2)
Medal record
Men's Football
Representing Serbia
UEFA U19 Championship
Winner	2013 Lithuania
- * Club domestic league appearances and goals as of 9 August 2026

Aleksandar Čavrić (Serbian Cyrillic: Александар Чаврић; born 18 May 1994) is a professional footballer who plays as a winger or forward for Kashima Antlers. Born in Croatia, he represented Serbia at youth level.

== Club career ==
=== Serbia, Belgium and Danmark ===
Čavrić made his senior and simultaneously professional debut at Banat Zrenjanin in the 2011–12 Serbian First League season. His exceptional performances immediately called the attention of the top-tier, Serbian SuperLiga, squad, OFK Beograd which brought him in June 2012 as a great prospect. He was the club's top scorer with 11 league goals (from 30 appearances) in the 2013–14 season. On 1 September 2014, Čavrić officially joined the Belgian club Genk on a three-year contract (plus a two-year option). He moved on a season-long loan to the Danish side Aarhus in August 2015, with an option for a permanent deal.

=== Slovan Bratislava ===
In September 2016, Čavrić signed a four-year contract with Slovak club Slovan Bratislava.

On 3 November 2022, Čavrić scored two decisive goals during UEFA Europa Conference League – Group H fixture at LFF Stadium versus Žalgiris Vilnius (2–1), which secured a Slovak club first advancement to European play-off rounds in 17 years, when Čavrić's then-manager Vladimír Weiss Sr. led Artmedia Petržalka in the UEFA Champions League.

In January 2024, Čavrić joined J1 League club Kashima Antlers on loan for the remainder of the season with an option to buy. He scored and assisted on his league debut against Nagoya Grampus, scoring in 47th minute and assisting in the 62nd minute. On 20 July 2024, Čavrić suffered a knee and ankle ligament injury against FC Tokyo.

== International career ==
=== Youth career ===
Čavrić represented Serbia at the UEFA European Under-19 Championship twice, winning the gold medal in 2013. He subsequently went on to play for the Serbia U21s, taking part in both the 2015 and 2017 UEFA European Under-21 Championship, as the team exited in the group stage.

=== Senior career ===
Following the match against Žalgiris Vilnius in November 2022, it was announced that Čavrić and Slovan began pursuing Slovak citizenship, which would make him eligible to represent Slovakia internationally. Later in November ahead of Slovak national team fixtures against Montenegro and Chile, national team manager Francesco Calzona informed that he would consider Čavrić to the national team once he meets eligibility requirements.

== Career statistics ==
As of match played 7 February 2026

Club	Season	League			National cup (Note: Includes Serbian Cup, Belgian Cup, Danish Cup, Slovak Cup, Emperor's Cup)		League cup (Note: Includes J.League Cup)		Continental		Total	
Club	Season	Division	Apps	Goals	Apps	Goals	Apps	Goals	Apps	Goals	Apps	Goals
Banat Zrenjanin	2010–11	Serbian First League	1	0	0	0	—		—		1	0
Banat Zrenjanin	2011–12	Serbian First League	10	1	2	0	—		—		12	1
Banat Zrenjanin	Total		11	1	2	0	—		—		13	1
OFK Beograd	2012–13	Serbian SuperLiga	20	0	3	1	—		—		23	1
OFK Beograd	2013–14	Serbian SuperLiga	30	11	3	1	—		—		33	12
OFK Beograd	2014–15	Serbian SuperLiga	4	3	0	0	—		—		4	3
OFK Beograd	Total		54	14	6	2	—		—		60	16
Genk	2014–15	Belgian Pro League	16	0	1	0	—		—		17	0
Genk	2015–16	Belgian Pro League	2	0	0	0	—		—		2	0
Genk	Total		18	0	1	0	—		—		19	0
Aarhus (loan)	2015–16	Danish Superliga	19	1	3	0	—		—		22	1
Slovan Bratislava	2016–17	Slovak First Football League	19	4	5	4	—		—		24	8
Slovan Bratislava	2017–18	Slovak First Football League	26	12	5	1	—		3 (Note: Appearances in UEFA Europa League)	0	34	13
Slovan Bratislava	2018–19	Slovak First Football League	27	4	0	0	—		6	1	33	5
Slovan Bratislava	2019–20	Slovak First Football League	7	2	1	0	—		6 (Note: Two appearances in UEFA Champions League, four appearances and one goal in UEFA Europa League)	1	14	3
Slovan Bratislava	2020–21	Slovak First Football League	32	3	1	0	—		1	0	34	3
Slovan Bratislava	2021–22	Slovak First Football League	25	3	5	0	—		13 (Note: Four appearances in UEFA Champions League, three appearances in UEFA Europa League, six appearances and one goal in UEFA Europa Conference League)	1	43	4
Slovan Bratislava	2022–23	Slovak First Football League	30	15	6	5	—		16 (Note: Four appearances in UEFA Champions League, two appearances in UEFA Europa League, ten appearances and four goals in UEFA Europa Conference League)	4	52	24
Slovan Bratislava	2023–24	Slovak First Football League	15	9	0	0	—		13 (Note: Six appearances and one goal in UEFA Champions League, one appearance in UEFA Europa League, six appearances and four goals in UEFA Europa Conference League)	5	28	14
Slovan Bratislava	Total		181	52	20	9	—		58	12	259	73
Kashima Antlers (loan)	2024	J1 League	25	7	2	2	1	0	—		28	9
Kashima Antlers	2025	J1 League	31	3	4	2	1	0	—		36	5
Kashima Antlers	2026	J1 League	1	0	0	0	0	0	0	0	1	0
Kashima Antlers	Total		32	3	4	2	1	0	0	0	37	5
Career total			354	86	41	15	2	0	58	12	439	105

== Honours ==
=== Club ===
Slovan Bratislava

- Slovak Super Liga: 2018–19, 2019–20, 2020–21, 2021–22, 2022–23
- Slovak Cup: 2016–17, 2017–18, 2019–20, 2020–21

Kashima Antlers

- J1 League: 2025

=== International ===
Serbia U19

- UEFA Under-19 Championship: 2013

=== Individual ===
- Slovak Super Liga Player of the Month: November 2022, April 2023
- Slovak Super Liga Team of the Season: 2022–23
