= Yuta Higuchi =

Japanese footballer (born 1996)

Yuta Higuchi 樋口 雄太
Personal information
- Full name: Yuta Higuchi
- Date of birth: 30 October 1996 (age 30)
- Place of birth: Kamimine, Saga Prefecture, Japan
- Height: 1.68 m (5 ft 6 in)
- Position: Winger

Team information
- Current team: Kashima Antlers
- Number: 14

Youth career
- –2014: Sagan Tosu

College career
Years	Team	Apps	(Gls)
2015–2018	NIFS Kanoya		

Senior career*
Years	Team	Apps	(Gls)
2019–2021	Sagan Tosu	66	(7)
2022–	Kashima Antlers	141	(9)
- * Club domestic league appearances and goals as of 9 August 2026

Yuta Higuchi (樋口 雄太, Higuchi Yūta; born 30 October 1996) is a Japanese professional footballer who plays as a midfielder for J1 League club Kashima Antlers.

== Youth career ==
Born in Kamimine, Saga Prefecture, Higuchi began his career coming up through the academy at his boyhood team Sagan Tosu. He played for their U-12, U-15 and U-18 sides, however he was not promoted to the senior squad.

After failing to make the Sagan Tosu squad, from 2015 to 2018 Higuchi studied at the National Institute of Fitness and Sports in Kanoya and played 75 games for them in the JUFA Kyushu League, the Japan College Prime Minister's Cup and the Japan Inter College Tournament.

== Career ==
=== Sagan Tosu ===
In November 2018, Higuchi signed his first professional contract with Sagan Tosu after graduating from college and would play for them in the 2019 season. He made his debut in the second league game of the season, coming on as a second-half substitute for Masato Fujita in a 1–0 defeat to Vissel Kobe. He was named as a starter for the first time in the following month, in a 3–1 J.League Cup defeat to Vegalta Sendai. In his debut season, Higuchi made eight appearances across all competitions.

The 2020 season was Higuchi's breakout year, as he went on to 28 appearances and help Tosu to an improved 13th place finish in the league. As well as providing four assists, he scored his first professional goal from a direct free-kick in a 2–1 victory over Cerezo Osaka.

In January 2021, Higuchi was handed the number 10 shirt for the upcoming season. He did not disappoint and made 42 appearances across all competitions, providing six assists and six goals and received some rave reviews for his performances. Sagan Tosu finished the season in 7th place in the J1 League, the highest placed finish in their history. At the end of his third season, Higuchi had scored eight goals in 78 appearances for the club.

=== Kashima Antlers ===
In December 2021, he transferred to Kashima Antlers. Higuchi enjoyed a strong first season representing Kashima, playing 42 games for the club across all competitions and finishing with the 8 league assists, the second highest amount for the season. He finished the season with 13 assists in total.

Higuchi continued to be a key player for Kashima in his second season with the club, starting most of their games. At the beginning of August 2023, he scored one and assisted two goals in a 3–0 victory over Hokkaido Consadole Sapporo, and following a string of other exceptional performances he was awarded the J.League Monthly MVP award.

== Career statistics ==
As of end of 2024 season

Appearances and goals by club, season and competition
Club	Season	League			National cup		League cup		Other		Total	
Club	Season	Division	Apps	Goals	Apps	Goals	Apps	Goals	Apps	Goals	Apps	Goals
Japan			League		Emperor's Cup		J.League Cup		Other		Total	
Sagan Tosu	2019	J1 League	1	0	2	0	5	0	—		8	0
Sagan Tosu	2020	J1 League	28	1	—		—		—		28	1
Sagan Tosu	2021	J1 League	37	6	3	1	2	0	—		42	7
Sagan Tosu	Total		66	7	5	1	7	0	—		78	8
Kashima Antlers	2022	J1 League	32	2	3	0	7	1	—		42	3
Kashima Antlers	2023	J1 League	33	3	1	0	3	0	—		37	3
Kashima Antlers	2024	J1 League	36	4	4	0	2	0	—		42	4
Kashima Antlers	Total		101	9	8	0	12	1	—		121	10
Career total			167	16	13	1	19	1	0	0	199	18

== Personal life ==
In December 2020, Higuchi announced his marriage. In August 2021, his wife gave birth to their first child, a boy.

== Honours ==
=== Club ===
Kashima Antlers

- J1 League: 2025
