= Guilherme Parede =

Brazilian footballer (born 1995)

Personal information
- Full name: Guilherme Parede Pinheiro
- Date of birth: 19 September 1995 (age 31)
- Place of birth: Nova Andradina, Brazil
- Height: 1.76 m (5 ft 9 in)
- Positions: Winger; forward

Team information
- Current team: América Mineiro
- Number: 7

Senior career*
Years	Team	Apps	(Gls)
2013	Operário Ferroviário	1	(0)
2013–2020	Coritiba	56	(13)
2017	→ J. Malucelli (loan)	7	(0)
2017	→ Ypiranga (loan)	11	(0)
2019	→ Internacional (loan)	38	(5)
2020–2025	Talleres	20	(4)
2020	→ Vasco da Gama (loan)	11	(0)
2022	→ Juventude (loan)	26	(2)
2023	→ Vila Nova (loan)	44	(7)
2024	→ Kashima Antlers (loan)	12	(0)
2025	Vila Nova	21	(0)
2026	Guarani	17	(2)
2026–	América Mineiro	21	(1)
- * Club domestic league appearances and goals as of 18 November 2026

Guilherme Parede Pinheiro is a Brazilian professional footballer who plays as a winger or forward for América Mineiro.

== Career ==
On 31 January 2020, Parede joined Talleres.

On 24 December 2023, Parede joined Kashima Antlers on loan. On 18 August 2024, he was injured during training. In December 2024, he returned to his parent club at the end of the Japanese league season.

== Career statistics ==
As of 7 January 2025

Appearances and goals by club, season and competition
Club	Season	League			State league		Cup (Note: Includes Copa do Brasil, Ukrainian Cup, Suomen Cup and Emperor's Cup)		League cup (Note: Includes J.League Cup)		Continental		Total	
Club	Season	Division	Apps	Goals	Apps	Goals	Apps	Goals	Apps	Goals	Apps	Goals	Apps	Goals
Operário Ferroviário	2013	Paranaense	—		1	0	—		—		—		1	0
Coritiba	2015	Série A	5	0	—		1	0	—		—		6	0
Coritiba	2016	Série A	2	0	4	0	1	0	—		2	0	9	0
Coritiba	2018	Série B	31	9	12	3	4	0	—		—		47	12
Coritiba	2020	Série A	—		2	1	—		—		—		2	1
Coritiba	Total		38	9	18	4	6	0	—		2	0	64	13
J. Malucelli (loan)	2017	Paranaense	—		7	0	—		—		—		7	0
Ypiranga (loan)	2017	Série C	11	0	—		—		—		—		11	0
Internacional (loan)	2019	Série A	25	3	13	2	4	0	4	0	—		46	5
Talleres	2019–20	Argentine Primera División	6	3	—		0	0	—		1	0	7	3
Talleres	2020–21	Argentine Primera División	6	0	—		—		—		—		6	0
Talleres	2021	Argentine Primera División	8	1	—		1	1	1	0	—		10	2
Talleres	Total		20	4	—		1	1	1	0	1	0	23	5
Vasco da Gama (loan)	2020	Série A	11	0	—		1	0	1	0	—		13	0
Juventude (loan)	2022	Série A	16	2	10	0	3	0	—		—		29	2
Vila Nova (loan)	2023	Série B	34	6	10	1	2	0	—		2	0	48	7
Kashima Antlers (loan)	2024	J1 League	12	0	—		2	0	2	0	—		16	0
Career total			167	24	59	7	19	1	8	0	5	0	258	32
