= Naoki Sutoh =

Japanese footballer

Naoki Sutoh 須藤 直輝
Personal information
- Date of birth: 1 October 2002 (age 24)
- Place of birth: Saitama, Japan
- Height: 1.69 m (5 ft 7 in)
- Position: Winger

Team information
- Current team: Preston Lions
- Number: 17

Youth career
- Cerebro FC
- Omiya Ardija
- 2018–2020: Shohei High School

Senior career*
Years	Team	Apps	(Gls)
2021–2026	Kashima Antlers	0	(0)
2022	→ Zweigen Kanazawa (loan)	15	(0)
2025–2026	→ Kochi United (loan)	29	(1)
2026–	Preston Lions	14	(1)
- * Club domestic league appearances and goals as of 1 January 2026

Naoki Sutoh (須藤 直輝, Sutoh Naoki; born 1 October 2002) is a Japanese professional footballer who plays as a winger and currently play for Australian club, Preston Lions in NPL Victoria.

== Career ==
On 3 January 2025, Sutoh joined newly promoted J3 League club Kochi United, on loan for the 2025 season. from Kashima Antlers.

== Career statistics ==
=== Club ===
As of the start from 2025 season.

Appearances and goals by club, season and competition
Club	Season	League			National Cup		League Cup		Other		Total	
Club	Season	Division	Apps	Goals	Apps	Goals	Apps	Goals	Apps	Goals	Apps	Goals
Japan			League		Emperor's Cup		J.League Cup		Other		Total	
Kashima Antlers	2021	J1 League	0	0	0	0	2	0	0	0	2	0
Kashima Antlers	2023	J1 League	0	0	0	0	0	0	0	0	0	0
Kashima Antlers	2024	J1 League	0	0	0	0	0	0	0	0	0	0
Kashima Antlers	Total		0	0	0	0	2	0	0	0	2	0
Zweigen Kanazawa (loan)	2022	J2 League	15	0	1	0	0	0	0	0	16	0
Kochi United (loan)	2025	J3 League	0	0	0	0	0	0	0	0	0	0
Career total			15	0	1	0	2	0	0	0	18	0
