= Tomoki Hayakawa =

Japanese footballer (born 1999)

Tomoki Hayakawa 早川 友基
- Hayakawa with Kashima Antlers in 2026

Personal information
- Date of birth: 3 March 1999 (age 27)
- Place of birth: Sagamihara, Kanagawa, Japan
- Height: 1.87 m (6 ft 2 in)
- Position: Goalkeeper

Team information
- Current team: Kashima Antlers
- Number: 1

Youth career
- Yokohama F. Marinos
- 2014–2016: Toin Gakuen High School

College career
| Years | Team | Apps | (Gls) |
| 2017–2020 | Meiji University | | |

Senior career*
| Years | Team | Apps | (Gls) |
| 2021– | Kashima Antlers | 132 | (0) |

International career^{‡}
| 2025– | Japan | 5 | (0) |
- * Club domestic league appearances and goals as of 11:23, 11 August 2026 (UTC) ‡ National team caps and goals as of 26 September 2026

Tomoki Hayakawa (早川 友基, Hayakawa Tomoki; born 3 March 1999) is a Japanese professional footballer who plays as a goalkeeper for J1 League club Kashima Antlers and the Japan national team.

== Club career ==
Hayakawa made his professional debut in a 8–1 Emperor's Cup win against YSCC Yokohama. He made his J1 League debut in the 2022 season, in a 1–1 draw with Sagan Tosu.

In the 2023 season, Hayakawa became first-choice goalkeeper for Kashima and played in every league game. Before the 2024 season, he was given the number 1 shirt following the retirement of Kwoun Sun-tae. In the 2024 season, Hayakawa also participated in every league game for the club and kept 15 clean sheets, the second most in the league.

In 2025, he played every minute of every league match for the third consecutive season and was named the Save of the Month award winner four times, contributing to Kashima's ninth league championship and their first in nine years. He was awarded the J.League Most Valuable Player award for the 2025 season at the J.League Awards ceremony held on 11 December. He is only the second goalkeeper to receive the award, after Seigo Narazaki.

== Style of play ==
Hayakawa is a goalkeeper known for his reflexes, agility, shot-stopping ability and body coordination. Despite standing at 187cm, he demonstrates considerable flexibility and fluidity in his movements, allowing him to make saves from difficult positions. His ability to coordinate different parts of his body, particularly when adjusting his balance and extending his reach, is regarded as one of his notable strengths.

His shot-stopping technique involves more than relying on reflexes alone. He makes effective use of his upper-body movement, weight distribution and coordinated extensions to reach shots directed towards the corners of the goal. His ability to adjust his body position quickly allows him to respond to shots from close range as well as efforts directed towards the far corners. Former Japan international goalkeeper Yuta Minami has particularly praised Hayakawa's body coordination and ability to move his body in ways that enable him to make difficult saves.

== International career ==
Hayakawa was called up Japan national team squad for the 2025 EAFF E-1 Football Championship. He made his debut on 12 July 2025 in a 2–0 win over China.

On 15 May 2026, Hayakawa was named in Japan's squad for the 2026 FIFA World Cup.

== Career statistics ==
=== Club ===
As of 15 May 2026.

Appearances and goals by club, season and competition
| Club | Season | League | | | Emperor's Cup | | J.League Cup | | Total | |
| Club | Season | Division | Apps | Goals | Apps | Goals | Apps | Goals | Apps | Goals |
|---|---|---|---|---|---|---|---|---|---|---|
| Kashima Antlers | 2021 | J1 League | 0 | 0 | 1 | 0 | 0 | 0 | 1 | 0 |
| Kashima Antlers | 2022 | J1 League | 5 | 0 | 0 | 0 | 0 | 0 | 5 | 0 |
| Kashima Antlers | 2023 | J1 League | 34 | 0 | 0 | 0 | 2 | 0 | 36 | 0 |
| Kashima Antlers | 2024 | J1 League | 38 | 0 | 2 | 0 | 2 | 0 | 42 | 0 |
| Kashima Antlers | 2025 | J1 League | 38 | 0 | 3 | 0 | 1 | 0 | 42 | 0 |
| Kashima Antlers | 2026 | J1 (100) | 17 | 0 | 0 | 0 | 0 | 0 | 17 | 0 |
| Kashima Antlers | Total | | 132 | 0 | 6 | 0 | 5 | 0 | 143 | 0 |
| Career total | | | 132 | 0 | 6 | 0 | 5 | 0 | 143 | 0 |

=== International ===
As of match played 24 September 2026

Appearances and goals by national team and year
| National team | Year | Apps | Goals |
|---|---|---|---|
| Japan | 2025 | 3 | 0 |
| Japan | 2026 | 2 | 0 |
| Total | | 5 | 0 |

== Honours ==
Kashima Antlers

- J1 League: 2025

Japan

- EAFF Championship: 2025

Individual

- J.League Player of the Year: 2025
- J.League Best XI: 2025
- J1 League Save of the Month: April 2025, September 2025, October 2025, November/December 2025
- J1 100 Year Vision League Regional Round East Save of the Month: February 2026
- J1 100 Year Vision League Regional Round East Best Eleven: 2026
- J1 100 Year Vision League Regional Round East Best Player: 2026
- J1 100 Year Vision League Regional Round East Save of the Year: 2026
