= Hidehiro Sugai =

Japanese footballer

Hidehiro Sugai 須貝 英大
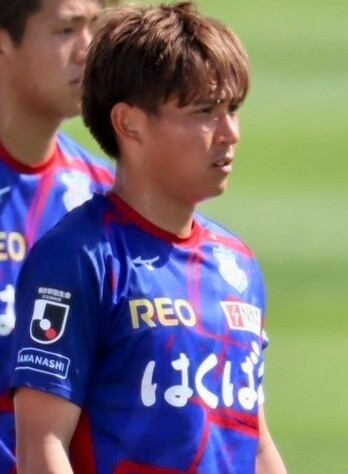
- Sugai in 2023

Personal information
- Date of birth: 27 October 1998 (age 28)
- Place of birth: Chūō, Yamanashi, Japan
- Height: 1.72 m (5 ft 8 in)
- Position: Defender

Team information
- Current team: Shimizu S-Pulse
- Number: 24

Youth career
- 2014–2016: Hamamatsu Kaiseikan High School

College career
Years	Team	Apps	(Gls)
2017–2020	Meiji University		

Senior career*
Years	Team	Apps	(Gls)
2020–2023	Ventforet Kofu	87	(9)
2023–2024	Kashima Antlers	21	(0)
2025–2026	Kyoto Sanga	55	(2)
2026–	Shimizu S-Pulse	1	(0)
- * Club domestic league appearances and goals as of 10 August 2026

Hidehiro Sugai (須貝 英大, Sugai Hidehiro; born 27 October 1998) is a Japanese footballer who plays as a left-back for J1 League club Shimizu S-Pulse.

== Career ==
On 26 September 2020, Sugai made his league debut against Albirex Niigata.

On 16 October 2022, Sugai won the 2022 Emperor's Cup after Ventforet Kofu beat Sanfrecce Hiroshima on penalties.

On 25 July 2023, Sugai joined Kashima Antlers.

After two seasons at Kashima Antlers, in December 2024 Sugai was transferred to fellow J1 League club Kyoto Sanga.

== Career statistics ==
=== Club ===
As of end of 2024 season.

Appearances and goals by club, season and competition
Club	Season	League			National cup		League cup		Other		Total	
Club	Season	Division	Apps	Goals	Apps	Goals	Apps	Goals	Apps	Goals	Apps	Goals
Japan			League		Emperor's Cup		J. League Cup		Other		Total	
Meiji University	2019	–			2	0	–		–		2	0
Ventforet Kofu	2020	J2 League	2	0	0	0	–		–		2	0
Ventforet Kofu	2021	J2 League	18	1	0	0	–		–		18	1
Ventforet Kofu	2022	J2 League	41	5	5	0	–		–		46	5
Ventforet Kofu	2023	J2 League	26	3	2	0	–		1 (Note: Appearance in the Japanese Super Cup)	0	29	3
Ventforet Kofu	Total		87	9	7	0	0	0	1	0	95	9
Kashima Antlers	2023	J1 League	8	0	0	0	1	0	–		9	0
Kashima Antlers	2024	J1 League	13	0	3	0	2	0	–		18	0
Kashima Antlers	Total		21	0	3	0	3	0	0	0	27	0
Career total			108	9	10	0	3	0	1	0	122	9

== Honours ==
=== Club ===
Ventforet Kofu

- Emperor's Cup: 2022
