= Tomoya Fujii =

Japanese footballer (born 1998)

Tomoya Fujii 藤井 智也
Personal information
- Full name: Tomoya Fujii
- Date of birth: 4 December 1998 (age 27)
- Place of birth: Gifu, Gifu, Japan
- Height: 1.73 m (5 ft 8 in)
- Position: Winger

Team information
- Current team: Shimizu S-Pulse
- Number: 50

Youth career
- Nagara Nishi SSS
- Wakaayu Nagara FC
- 2014–2016: Nagara High School

College career
Years	Team	Apps	(Gls)
2017–2020	Ritsumeikan University		

Senior career*
Years	Team	Apps	(Gls)
2020–2022	Sanfrecce Hiroshima	71	(2)
2023–2024	Kashima Antlers	47	(3)
2025–2026	Shonan Bellmare	48	(2)
2026–	Shimizu S-Pulse	1	(0)
- * Club domestic league appearances and goals as of 10 August 2026

Tomoya Fujii (藤井 智也, Fujii Tomoya; born 4 December 1998) is a Japanese professional footballer who plays as a winger for club Shimizu S-Pulse.

== Career ==
On 20 January 2020, it was announced that Fujii would be joining J1 League club Sanfrecce Hiroshima from the 2021 season. On 12 February 2020, he joined the club as a designated special player for the 2020 season. Fujii made his first team debut in the J.League Cup against Yokohama FC on 16 February 2020. He made his league debut for Sanfreece Hiroshima against Vissel Kobe on 4 July 2020. Fujii scored his first goal for the club against Tokushima Vortis on 4 December 2021, scoring in the 9th minute.

On 25 November 2022, Fujii transferred to Kashima Antlers. He made his league debut for Kashima against Kyoto Sanga on 18 February 2023. Fujii scored his first goal for the club on 4 March 2023, scoring against Yokohama FC in the 9th minute.

In December 2024, Fujii joined J1 League club Shonan Bellmare.

== Style of play ==
Fujii is one of the fastest players in the J League, and is known for his crossing ability. He can play as a right wingback, or a fullback, or a right or left side half. He is noted for returning to his position quickly and switching between offensive and defensive play.

== Career statistics ==
=== Club ===
As of end of 2024 season.

Appearances and goals by club, season and competition
Club	Season	League			Emperor's Cup		J.League Cup		Total	
Club	Season	Division	Apps	Goals	Apps	Goals	Apps	Goals	Apps	Goals
Ritsumeikan University	2019	–			2	0	—		2	0
Sanfrecce Hiroshima	2020	J1 League	15	0	0	0	2	0	17	0
Sanfrecce Hiroshima	2021	J1 League	29	1	1	0	5	0	35	1
Sanfrecce Hiroshima	2022	J1 League	27	1	2	0	6	0	35	1
Sanfrecce Hiroshima	Total		71	2	3	0	13	0	87	2
Kashima Antlers	2023	J1 League	22	1	2	0	5	0	29	1
Kashima Antlers	2024	J1 League	25	2	3	1	0	0	28	3
Kashima Antlers	Total		47	3	5	1	5	0	57	4
Career total			118	5	8	1	18	0	144	6

== Honours ==
Sanfreece Hiroshima

- J.League Cup: 2022
- Emperor's Cup: 2022 Emperor's Cup (runners-up)
