= Hayato Nakama =

Japanese footballer

Hayato Nakama 仲間 隼斗
Personal information
- Full name: Hayato Nakama
- Date of birth: May 16, 1992 (age 34)
- Place of birth: Higashiagatsuma, Japan
- Height: 1.70 m (5 ft 7 in)
- Positions: Attacking midfielder; forward

Team information
- Current team: Kashiwa Reysol
- Number: 19

Youth career
- 2005–2010: Kashiwa Reysol

Senior career*
Years	Team	Apps	(Gls)
2011–2015	Roasso Kumamoto	100	(11)
2015	→ Kamatamare Sanuki (loan)	40	(3)
2016–2017	Kamatamare Sanuki	77	(9)
2018–2019	Fagiano Okayama	78	(23)
2020–2021	Kashiwa Reysol	53	(6)
2022–2024	Kashima Antlers	74	(7)
2025–	Kashiwa Reysol	29	(3)
- * Club domestic league appearances and goals as of 10 August 2026

Hayato Nakama (仲間 隼斗, Nakama Hayato; born May 16, 1992) is a Japanese professional footballer who plays as an attacking midfielder for J1 League club Kashiwa Reysol.

== Career ==
At the end of the 2024 season, Nakama returned to Kashiwa Reysol following three years with Kashima Antlers.

== Club statistics ==
As of end of 2024 season

Appearances and goals by club, season and competition
Club	Season	League			National Cup		League Cup		Total	
Club	Season	Division	Apps	Goals	Apps	Goals	Apps	Goals	Apps	Goals
Japan			League		Emperor's Cup		J.League Cup		Total	
Roasso Kumamoto	2011	J.League Division 2	16	1	–		–		16	1
Roasso Kumamoto	2012	J.League Division 2	15	0	2	1	–		17	1
Roasso Kumamoto	2013	J.League Division 2	40	6	2	0	–		42	6
Roasso Kumamoto	2014	J. League Division 2	29	4	1	0	–		30	4
Roasso Kumamoto	Total		100	11	5	1	0	0	105	12
Kamatamare Sanuki (loan)	2015	J2 League	40	3	1	1	–		41	4
Kamatamare Sanuki	2016	J2 League	38	7	2	0	–		40	7
Kamatamare Sanuki	2017	J2 League	39	2	1	0	–		40	2
Kamatamare Sanuki	Total		77	9	3	0	0	0	80	9
Fagiano Okayama	2018	J2 League	38	8	–		–		38	8
Fagiano Okayama	2019	J2 League	40	15	1	0	–		41	15
Fagiano Okayama	Total		78	23	1	0	0	0	79	23
Kashiwa Reysol	2020	J1 League	29	4	–		4	0	33	4
Kashiwa Reysol	2021	J1 League	24	2	1	0	3	0	28	2
Kashiwa Reysol	Total		53	6	1	0	7	0	61	6
Kashima Antlers	2022	J1 League	19	2	3	1	5	1	27	4
Kashima Antlers	2023	J1 League	27	1	2	0	6	2	35	3
Kashima Antlers	2024	J1 League	28	4	2	1	1	0	31	5
Kashima Antlers	Total		74	7	7	2	12	3	93	12
Career total			422	59	18	5	19	3	459	66
