= Ryotaro Nakamura =

Japanese footballer

Ryotaro Nakamura 中村 亮太朗
Personal information
- Date of birth: 27 September 1997 (age 29)
- Place of birth: Niigata, Niigata, Japan
- Height: 1.79 m (5 ft 10 in)
- Position: Defensive midfielder

Team information
- Current team: Montedio Yamagata
- Number: 7

Youth career
- 2004–2008: FC Blue Wing Niigata Minami
- 2009: Toyoteru SSS
- 2010–2012: Granscena Niigata FC
- 2013–2015: Niigata Meikun High School

College career
Years	Team	Apps	(Gls)
2016–2019	Chuo University		

Senior career*
Years	Team	Apps	(Gls)
2020–2021	Ventforet Kofu	59	(7)
2022–2025	Kashima Antlers	12	(0)
2023	→ Ventforet Kofu (loan)	12	(2)
2024	→ Shimizu S-Pulse (loan)	36	(1)
2025–	Montedio Yamagata	42	(0)
- * Club domestic league appearances and goals as of 13 August 2026

Ryotaro Nakamura (中村 亮太朗, Nakamura Ryotaro; born 27 September 1997) is a Japanese professional footballer who plays as a defensive midfielder for J2 League club Montedio Yamagata.

== Career statistics ==
=== Club ===
As of 15 February 2025.

Appearances and goals by club, season and competition
Club	Season	League			National Cup		League Cup		Other		Total	
Club	Season	Division	Apps	Goals	Apps	Goals	Apps	Goals	Apps	Goals	Apps	Goals
Japan			League		Emperor's Cup		J.League Cup		Other		Total	
Ventforet Kofu	2020	J2 League	26	3	0	0	–		–		26	3
Ventforet Kofu	2021	J2 League	33	4	1	0	–		–		34	4
Ventforet Kofu	Total		59	7	1	0	0	0	0	0	60	7
Kashima Antlers	2022	J1 League	12	0	3	0	6	0	–		21	0
Kashima Antlers	2023	J1 League	3	0	1	0	3	0	–		7	0
Kashima Antlers	Total		15	0	4	0	9	0	0	0	28	0
Ventforet Kofu (loan)	2023	J2 League	12	2	0	0	–		4 (Note: Appearances in the AFC Champions League)	0	16	2
Shimizu S-Pulse (loan)	2024	J2 League	36	1	1	0	0	0	–		37	1
Montedio Yamagata	2025	J2 League	1	0	0	0	0	0	–		1	0
Career total			123	10	6	0	9	0	4	0	142	10
