= Shintaro Nago =

Japanese footballer

Shintaro Nago 名古 新太郎
Personal information
- Full name: Shintaro Nago
- Date of birth: April 17, 1996 (age 30)
- Place of birth: Osaka, Japan
- Height: 1.68 m (5 ft 6 in)
- Position: Midfielder

Team information
- Current team: Avispa Fukuoka
- Number: 14

Youth career
- 1999–2004: Toyosato SC
- 2005–2010: Osaka Higashiyodogawa FC
- 2011–2013: Shizuoka Gakuen High School

College career
Years	Team	Apps	(Gls)
2014–2017	Juntendo University		

Senior career*
Years	Team	Apps	(Gls)
2018–2024	Kashima Antlers	79	(6)
2021	→ Shonan Bellmare (loan)	19	(3)
2025–	Avispa Fukuoka	61	(2)
Medal record
Kashima Antlers
Winner	AFC Champions League	2018
- * Club domestic league appearances and goals as of 21:47, 21 September 2026 (UTC)

Shintaro Nago (名古 新太郎, Nago Shintarō; born April 17, 1996) who plays as a central midfielder for J1 League club Avispa Fukuoka.

== Playing career ==
Nago was born in Osaka Prefecture on April 17, 1996. In March 2018, it was announced he would be joining J1 League club Kashima Antlers for the 2019 season but in May 2018 Nago was confirmed as a designated special player for the remainder of the 2018 season. This would allow him to play for both Juntendo University and Kashima Antlers.

In August 2018, Nago made his debut for Kashima in a 4–2 league defeat to Nagoya Grampus.

Nago scored his first goal for the club in the quarter-finals of the 2019 J.League Cup, in a 3–2 victory over Urawa Reds.

In 2021, Nago was loaned out to J1 club Shonan Bellmare. He made nineteen appearances and scored three goals. His first goal was scored on his first start for the club in a 3–1 league win over Vegalta Sendai.

Nago continued to be a squad player for the following two seasons, only making 23 appearances across the 2022 and 2023. In the 2024 season he was afforded more game time under new manager Ranko Popović and paid him back with seven goals and assists in May and was unlucky not to win the Monthly MVP award.

Despite appearing in over forty matches for the club in the 2024, the most appearances he has made in his six seasons with Kashima, at the end of the season it was announced that he would be joining Avispa Fukuoka for the 2025 season.

== Career statistics ==
As of 21 September 2026

Appearances and goals by club, season and competition
Club	Season	League			National cup (Note: Includes Emperors Cup)		League cup (Note: Includes J.League Cup)		Continental		Total	
Club	Season	Division	Apps	Goals	Apps	Goals	Apps	Goals	Apps	Goals	Apps	Goals
Kashima Antlers	2018	J1 League	1	0	0	0	0	0	0	0	1	0
Kashima Antlers	2019	J1 League	15	0	3	0	3	1	6 (Note: Appearances in AFC Champions League)	0	27	1
Kashima Antlers	2020	J1 League	8	0	0	0	1	0	0	0	9	0
Kashima Antlers	2022	J1 League	5	0	1	0	0	0	0	0	6	0
Kashima Antlers	2023	J1 League	14	1	1	0	2	0	0	0	17	1
Kashima Antlers	2024	J1 League	36	5	4	0	1	0	0	0	41	5
Kashima Antlers	Total		79	6	9	0	7	1	6	0	101	7
Shonan Bellmare (loan)	2021	J1 League	19	3	1	0	3	0	–		23	3
Avispa Fukuoka	2025	J1 League	38	2	3	0	3	0	–		44	2
Avispa Fukuoka	2026	J1 (100)	15	0	–		–		–		15	0
Avispa Fukuoka	2026–27	J1 League	8	0	0	0	0	0	–		8	0
Avispa Fukuoka	Total		61	2	3	0	3	0	0	0	67	2
Career total			159	11	13	0	13	1	6	0	191	12
