= Yuki Kakita =

Japanese footballer (born 1997)

Yuki Kakita 垣田 裕暉
Personal information
- Full name: Yuki Kakita
- Date of birth: 14 July 1997 (age 29)
- Place of birth: Gunma, Japan
- Height: 1.87 m (6 ft 2 in)
- Position: Striker

Team information
- Current team: Kashiwa Reysol
- Number: 18

Youth career
- –2015: Kashima Antlers

Senior career*
Years	Team	Apps	(Gls)
2016–2024	Kashima Antlers	36	(4)
2017–2019	→ Zweigen Kanazawa (loan)	105	(20)
2020–2021	→ Tokushima Vortis (loan)	78	(25)
2022	→ Sagan Tosu (loan)	28	(6)
2024–	Kashiwa Reysol	68	(11)

International career^{‡}
2016	Japan U-19	0	(0)
2025–	Japan	2	(0)
Medal record
Kashima Antlers
Winner	J1 League	2016
Winner	Emperor's Cup	2016
- * Club domestic league appearances and goals as of 10 August 2026 ‡ National team caps and goals as of 15 July 2025

Yuki Kakita (垣田 裕暉, Kakita Yūki; born 14 July 1997) is a Japanese professional footballer who plays as a forward for J1 League club Kashiwa Reysol and the Japan national team.

Kakita came through the youth academy at Kashima Antlers and began his professional career there in 2016. He had loan spells at Zweigen Kanazawa in 2017, Tokushima Vortis in 2020 and Sagan Tosu in 2022 before joining Kashiwa Reysol in 2024. Kakita has earned 2 caps for the Japan national team.

== Career ==
=== Kashima Antlers ===
Kakita was promoted to the Kashima Antlers first team in 2016. He made his league debut against Nagoya Grampus on 13 July 2016. Kakita scored his first league goal against Albirex Niigata on 23 April 2023.

=== Loan to Zweigen Kanazawa ===
Kakita was announced at Zweigen Kanazawa. He made his league debut against Ehime on 26 February 2017. Kakita scored his first league goal against Montedio Yamagata on 11 August 2017, scoring in the 68th minute. On 14 December 2017, his loan was extended for another year. Kakita's loan was extended for another year on 12 December 2018.

=== Loan to Tokushima Vortis ===
Kakita made his league debut against Tokyo Verdy on 23 February 2020. He scored his first league goal against Ehime on 27 June 2020, scoring in the 16th minute.

On 16 December 2020, Kakita scored his 17th goal against Omiya Ardija, which helped promote Tokushima Vortis to the J1 League for the first time in 7 years.

=== Loan to Sagan Tosu ===
On 28 December 2021, Kakita was announced at Sagan Tosu. He made his league debut against Sanfrecce Hiroshima on 19 February 2022. Kakita scored his first league goal against Urawa Red Diamonds on 13 March 2022, scoring in the 71st minute.

=== Kashiwa Reysol ===
In July 2024, it was announced that Kakita would be transferring to Kashiwa Reysol. He made his league debut against Nagoya Grampus on 14 July 2024. Kakita scored his first league goal against Kawasaki Frontale on 20 July 2024, scoring in the 67th minute.

== Club statistics ==
As of 21 April 2026

Appearances and goals by club, season and competition
Club	Season	League			National cup (Note: Includes Emperors Cup)		League cup (Note: Includes J.League Cup)		Total	
Club	Season	Division	Apps	Goals	Apps	Goals	Apps	Goals	Apps	Goals
Kashima Antlers	2016	J1 League	3	0	0	0	2	0	5	0
Kashima Antlers	2023	J1 League	29	4	1	1	4	0	34	5
Kashima Antlers	2024	J1 League	4	0	0	0	2	0	6	0
Kashima Antlers	Total		36	4	1	1	8	0	45	5
Zweigen Kanazawa (loan)	2017	J2 League	32	3	2	0	–		34	3
Zweigen Kanazawa (loan)	2018	J2 League	38	9	2	1	–		40	10
Zweigen Kanazawa (loan)	2019	J2 League	35	8	1	0	–		36	8
Zweigen Kanazawa (loan)	Total		105	20	5	1	0	0	110	21
Tokushima Vortis (loan)	2020	J2 League	42	17	2	0	0	0	44	17
Tokushima Vortis (loan)	2021	J1 League	36	8	1	0	2	0	39	8
Tokushima Vortis (loan)	Total		78	25	3	0	2	0	83	25
Sagan Tosu (loan)	2022	J1 League	28	6	3	1	3	0	34	7
Kashiwa Reysol	2024	J1 League	13	1	1	0	0	0	14	1
Kashiwa Reysol	2025	J1 League	38	6	1	0	8	5	47	11
Kashiwa Reysol	2026	J1 (100)	7	1	0	0	0	0	7	1
Kashiwa Reysol	Total		58	8	2	0	8	5	68	13
Career total			305	63	14	3	21	5	340	71

== Honours ==
Japan

- EAFF Championship: 2025
