= Ikuma Sekigawa =

Japanese footballer

Ikuma Sekigawa 関川 郁万
- Sekigawa with Kashima Antlers in 2026

Personal information
- Date of birth: 13 September 2000 (age 26)
- Place of birth: Hachiōji, Tokyo, Japan
- Height: 1.82 m (6 ft 0 in)
- Position: Centre back

Team information
- Current team: Kashima Antlers
- Number: 5

Youth career
- –2012: Arte Hazama
- 2013–2015: FC Tama
- 2016–2018: RKU Kashiwa High School

Senior career*
Years	Team	Apps	(Gls)
2019–	Kashima Antlers	152	(4)
- * Club domestic league appearances and goals as of 21:58, 23 September 2026 (UTC)

Ikuma Sekigawa (関川 郁万, Sekigawa Ikuma; born 13 September 2000) is a Japanese professional footballer who plays as a centre back for J1 League club Kashima Antlers.

== Youth career ==
Born in Tokyo, Sekigawa started playing football when he was three years old. He joined his first club, FC Tama Junior Youth, whilst he was in elementary school. He attended high school at Ryutsu Keizai University Kashiwa High School, where he played from his first year. In 2016, aged 16, Sekigawa's high school were runners-up in the Inter High School Championship following a 1–0 defeat to Ichiritsu Funabashi High School. Sekigawa played 4 times in the competition, as well as another 8 games in the Prince Takamado Trophy JFA U-18 Football League. The following year RKU Kashiwa High School went one better in the Inter High School Championship and were crowned champions. Sekigawa started all five games and was one of the driving forces behind the victory – drawing some comparisons to Kashima Antlers centre-back Naomichi Ueda. During the competition, Sekigawa scored a hat-trick in their third-round 5–0 win over Ichiritsu Nagano High School. They also finished runners-up in the All Japan High School Soccer Tournament, following a 1–0 defeat to Maebashi Ikuei High School. In his final year at high school, Kashiwa High School once again lost in the final of the All Japan High School Soccer Tournament – this time a 3–1 defeat to Aomori Yamada High School. The game was played in front of 54,194 supporters at Saitama Stadium 2002. Again Sekigawa was amongst the goals throughout the competition, scoring three goals in five games. In May 2018, it was announced that Sekigawa would be joining J1 League club Kashima Antlers for the 2019 season.

In his final competition for his high school, he was made captain for the 2018 Prince Takamado Cup, where he made 12 appearances and scored one goal.

== Club career ==
In April 2019, Sekigawa made his professional debut for Kashima in a 0–1 AFC Champions League defeat to Gyeongnam FC. In his debut season, he played twice in the AFC Champions League and made one appearance in the Emperor's Cup.

Sekigawa made his J.League debut in the 2020 season, starting at centre-back in a 3–0 defeat by Sanfrecce Hiroshima. He went on to make 17 appearances across all competitions, playing over 1000 minutes of J1 League football and also making his first appearance in the J.League Cup.

In the 2021 season, Sekigawa scored his first goal for the club in a 2–1 defeat to Urawa Red Diamonds. Following an indirect free-kick from the opponents half, Sekigawa looped a header over the goalkeeper to draw the game level. This was his first game back following suspension after receiving his first red card in a 1–0 defeat to Avispa Fukuoka the previous month. Sekigawa made 21 appearances across all competitions.

Following the departures of defenders Tomoya Inukai and Koki Machida before the start of the 2022 season, Sekigawa was handed the number 5 shirt was afforded much more playing time. He was first-choice centre-back for much of the season.

== Career statistics ==
As of match played 20 September 2026

Appearances and goals by club, season and competition
Club	Season	League			National cup (Note: Includes Emperors Cup)		League cup (Note: Includes J.League Cup)		Continental		Total	
Club	Season	Division	Apps	Goals	Apps	Goals	Apps	Goals	Apps	Goals	Apps	Goals
Kashima Antlers	2019	J1 League	0	0	1	0	0	0	2 (Note: Appearances in AFC Champions League)	0	3	0
Kashima Antlers	2020	J1 League	15	0	0	0	2	0	0	0	17	0
Kashima Antlers	2021	J1 League	13	1	1	0	7	0	—		21	1
Kashima Antlers	2022	J1 League	32	0	4	0	5	1	—		41	1
Kashima Antlers	2023	J1 League	30	2	1	0	6	0	—		37	2
Kashima Antlers	2024	J1 League	37	1	4	0	2	0	—		43	1
Kashima Antlers	2025	J1 League	14	0	0	0	0	0	—		14	0
Kashima Antlers	2026	J1 (100)	6	0	—		—		—		6	0
Kashima Antlers	2026–27	J1 League	5	0	1	0	0	0	—		6	0
Kashima Antlers	Total		152	4	12	0	22	1	2	0	188	5
Career total			152	4	12	0	22	1	2	0	188	5

== International career ==
Sekigawa has been selected for the U-16, U-17 and U-20 national team squads. However, he twice had to pull out of U-16 squad call-ups due to injury, firstly in August 2015 and secondly in May 2016. In 2019, he was called-up to replace the injured Ryotaro Tsunoda as part of the U-20s Chiba training camp before the 2019 FIFA U-20 World Cup, although Sekigawa did not make the squad for the tournament.

== Honours ==
=== Club ===
Kashima Antlers

- J1 League: 2025
