= Shu Morooka =

Japanese footballer

Shu Morooka 師岡 柊生
Personal information
- Date of birth: 9 December 2000 (age 25)
- Place of birth: Hachiōji, Tokyo, Japan
- Height: 1.74 m (5 ft 9 in)
- Position: Forward

Team information
- Current team: Avispa Fukuoka
- Number: 13

Youth career
- Owada SC
- FC Tama
- 2016–2018: Aviation High School

College career
Years	Team	Apps	(Gls)
2019–2022	Tokyo International University		

Senior career*
Years	Team	Apps	(Gls)
2023–2026	Kashima Antlers	58	(8)
2026–	Avispa Fukuoka	0	(0)
- * Club domestic league appearances and goals as of 12:58, 4 August 2026 (UTC)

Shu Morooka (師岡 柊生, Morooka Shu; born 9 December 2000) is a Japanese professional footballer who plays as a forward for J1 League club Avispa Fukuoka.

== Youth career ==
In junior high school, Morooka played for FC Tama alongside Ikuma Sekigawa and Junma Miyazaki. He attended Aviation High School and represented them at the National High School Championship in the 2018 tournament, where they lost in the quarter-finals.

In 2019, Morooka moved to Tokyo International University and scored 7 goals in 13 appearances in his debut season. He continued to be a regular starter during his time at university and ended up making 78 appearances in his four seasons across all competitions, including the Kanto University League, scoring 31 goals.

== Club career ==
In August 2022, Morooka received an offer from Júbilo Iwata to join them ahead of the 2023 season. However, in November the offer was cancelled as Júbilo had been prohibited from registering new players by FIFA for two transfer windows due to a breach of contract involving Fabián González. This allowed J1 League club Kashima Antlers to offer a contract immediately following the announcement, to which Morooka accepted. The move would join him back up with former school teammate Ikuma Sekigawa.

On 8 March 2023, Morooka made his debut for Kashima in a 1–1 J.League Cup draw with Kashiwa Reysol, appearing as a second-half substitute for Ryotaro Araki. He made his first start for the club in the following month, in a 1–0 league victory over Avispa Fukuoka. Morooka made 9 appearances across all competitions in his debut season.

In his second season, Morooka was afforded much more game time under new manager Ranko Popović and has been a regular member of the starting XI. In July 2024, he scored his first professional goal in a 2–0 victory over Hokkaido Consadole Sapporo. He scored consecutive goals in the last two games of the season to finish the season with three goals overall.

After four seasons with Kashima, in June 2026 Morooka joined fellow J1 League club Avispa Fukuoka ahead of the 2026–27 J1 League season.

== Career statistics ==
=== Club ===
As of 4 August 2026

Appearances and goals by club, season and competition
Club	Season	League			National cup (Note: Includes Emperors Cup)		League cup (Note: Includes J.League Cup)		Total	
Club	Season	Division	Apps	Goals	Apps	Goals	Apps	Goals	Apps	Goals
Tokyo International University	2020	–			1	0	–		1	0
Kashima Antlers	2023	J1 League	4	0	1	0	4	0	9	0
Kashima Antlers	2024	J1 League	32	3	3	0	2	0	37	3
Kashima Antlers	2025	J1 League	11	2	0	0	2	1	13	3
Kashima Antlers	2026	J1 (100)	11	3	0	0	0	0	11	3
Kashima Antlers	Total		58	8	4	0	8	1	70	9
Avispa Fukuoka	2026–27	J1 League	0	0	0	0	0	0	0	0
Career total			58	8	5	0	8	1	71	9

== Style of play ==
Morooka is described as being a well-balanced forward which allows him to effectively lead the line. He is also a hard-working player both offensively and defensively.

== Honours ==
=== Club ===
Kashima Antlers

- J1 League: 2025
