= Kento Misao =

Japanese footballer

Kento Misao 三竿 健斗
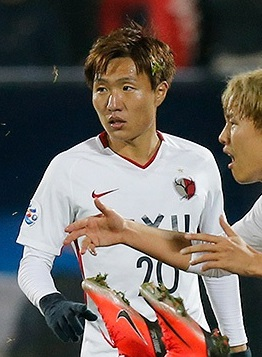
- Misao playing for Kashima Antlers in 2018

Personal information
- Full name: Kento Misao
- Date of birth: 16 April 1996 (age 30)
- Place of birth: Musashino, Tokyo, Japan
- Height: 1.81 m (5 ft 11 in)
- Positions: Defensive midfielder; centre back

Team information
- Current team: Kashima Antlers
- Number: 6

Youth career
- Yokogawa Musashino
- –2014: Tokyo Verdy

Senior career*
Years	Team	Apps	(Gls)
2015	Tokyo Verdy	39	(0)
2016–2022	Kashima Antlers	182	(4)
2023	Santa Clara	17	(0)
2023–2024	OH Leuven	20	(1)
2024–	Kashima Antlers	62	(2)

International career
2013	Japan U17	2	(0)
2017–	Japan	6	(0)
Medal record
Kashima Antlers
Winner	AFC Champions League	2018
Winner	J1 League	2016
Runner-up	J1 League	2017
Winner	Emperor's Cup	2016
Representing Japan
AFC U-23 Championship
Gold medal – first place	2016 Qatar
- * Club domestic league appearances and goals as of 9 August 2026

Kento Misao (三竿 健斗, Misao Kento; born 16 April 1996) is a Japanese professional footballer who plays as a defensive midfielder or a centre back for J1 League club Kashima Antlers.

== Club career ==
Misao was converted to a central midfielder during his time in Tokyo Verdy's youth ranks, On 18 April 2014, he was registered as a second-tier player for Tokyo Verdy's first team. Misao was fully promoted to first team of Verdy in 2015.

In January 2016, Misao signed for Kashima Antlers. On 5 July 2017, he played as a center-back against Gamba Osaka.

He was chosen as one of the candidates for award 2018 Asian Footballer of the Year.

After consistently good seasons at Kashima Antlers, he experienced a different role on his last season with the club. Since Mitsuo Ogasawara's retirement on 2018, he started several matches wearing the captain's armband, despite the relatively young age for a player to be named captain. On 2022, due to many problems regarding the back-line underperformances at the start of the season, Misao had to switch his position, playing as a center-back for the most part of the season.

=== Santa Clara ===
After showcasing his versatility and consistency at the Antlers, Misao was considered by Santa Clara as "a polivalent midfielder, who despite having better defensive proficiency, can also play in less defensive roles in the midfield." In December 2022, the then 26-year old Misao was announced for them as a 2022–23 new mid-season signing, coming in an initial transfer period of one season and a half, with an option to extend his contract for another two seasons.

=== OH Leuven ===
On 19 July 2023, Misao was announced at OH Leuven on a two year contract, becoming the first ever Japanese player for OH Leuven.

=== Return to Kashima Antlers ===
On 15 July 2024, Misao was announced at Kashima Antlers.

== International career ==
In October 2013, Misao was elected for the Japan U-17 national team, as part of the 2013 U-17 World Cup squad. He featured in 2 matches in the tournament.

Misao made his international debut against South Korea on 16 December 2017.

In May 2018, he was named in Japan's preliminary squad for the 2018 World Cup in Russia. However, Japan's manager Akira Nishino did not select Misao into the final 23-player squad.

== Personal life ==
His elder brother Yuto is also a professional footballer.

On 11 October 2021, it was announced that Misao and Nippon Television announcer Haruna Goto were getting married.

== Career statistics ==
=== Club ===
As of 14 January 2025

Appearances and goals by club, season and competition
Club	Season	League			Cup (Note: Includes Emperor's Cup and Belgian Cup)		League Cup (Note: Includes J.League Cup)		Continental (Note: Includes AFC Champions League)		Other		Total	
Club	Season	Division	Apps	Goals	Apps	Goals	Apps	Goals	Apps	Goals	Apps	Goals	Apps	Goals
Tokyo Verdy	2015	J2 League	39	0	2	0	–		–		–		41	0
Kashima Antlers	2016	J1 League	4	0	3	0	3	0	–		1 (Note: Appearances in the J.League Championship)	0	11	0
Kashima Antlers	2017	J1 League	26	1	2	0	2	0	3	0	–		33	1
Kashima Antlers	2018	J1 League	26	0	3	1	0	0	11	0	–		40	1
Kashima Antlers	2019	J1 League	28	0	2	0	2	0	8	0	–		40	0
Kashima Antlers	2020	J1 League	30	1	0	0	2	0	1	0	–		33	1
Kashima Antlers	2021	J1 League	34	0	2	0	7	0	–		–		43	0
Kashima Antlers	2022	J1 League	33	2	4	0	6	1	–		–		43	3
Kashima Antlers	Total		181	4	16	1	22	1	23	0	1	0	243	6
Santa Clara	2022–23	Primeira Liga	17	0	0	0	0	0	–		–		17	0
OH Leuven	2023–24	Belgian Pro League	20	1	1	0	0	0	–		–		21	1
Kashima Antlers	2024	J1 League	15	1	2	0	0	0	–		–		17	1
Kashima Antlers	2025	J1 League	29	0	3	0	1	0	–		–		33	0
Kashima Antlers	2026	J1 100 Year Vision League	17	1	–		–		–		–		17	1
Kashima Antlers	2026–27	J1 League	1	0	0	0	0	0	0	0	–		1	0
Kashima Antlers	Total		62	2	5	0	1	0	0	0	–		68	2
Career total			319	7	24	1	21	1	23	0	1	0	390	9

=== International ===
Japan national team
Year	Apps	Goals
2017	1	0
2018	5	0
Total	6	0

== Honours ==
=== Club ===
Kashima Antlers

- J1 League: 2025

Individual

- J1 100 Year Vision League Regional Round East Best Eleven: 2026
