= Hinata Stadium =

Sports venue in Miyazaki, Japan

Miyazaki Prefectural Sports Park Athletics Stadium
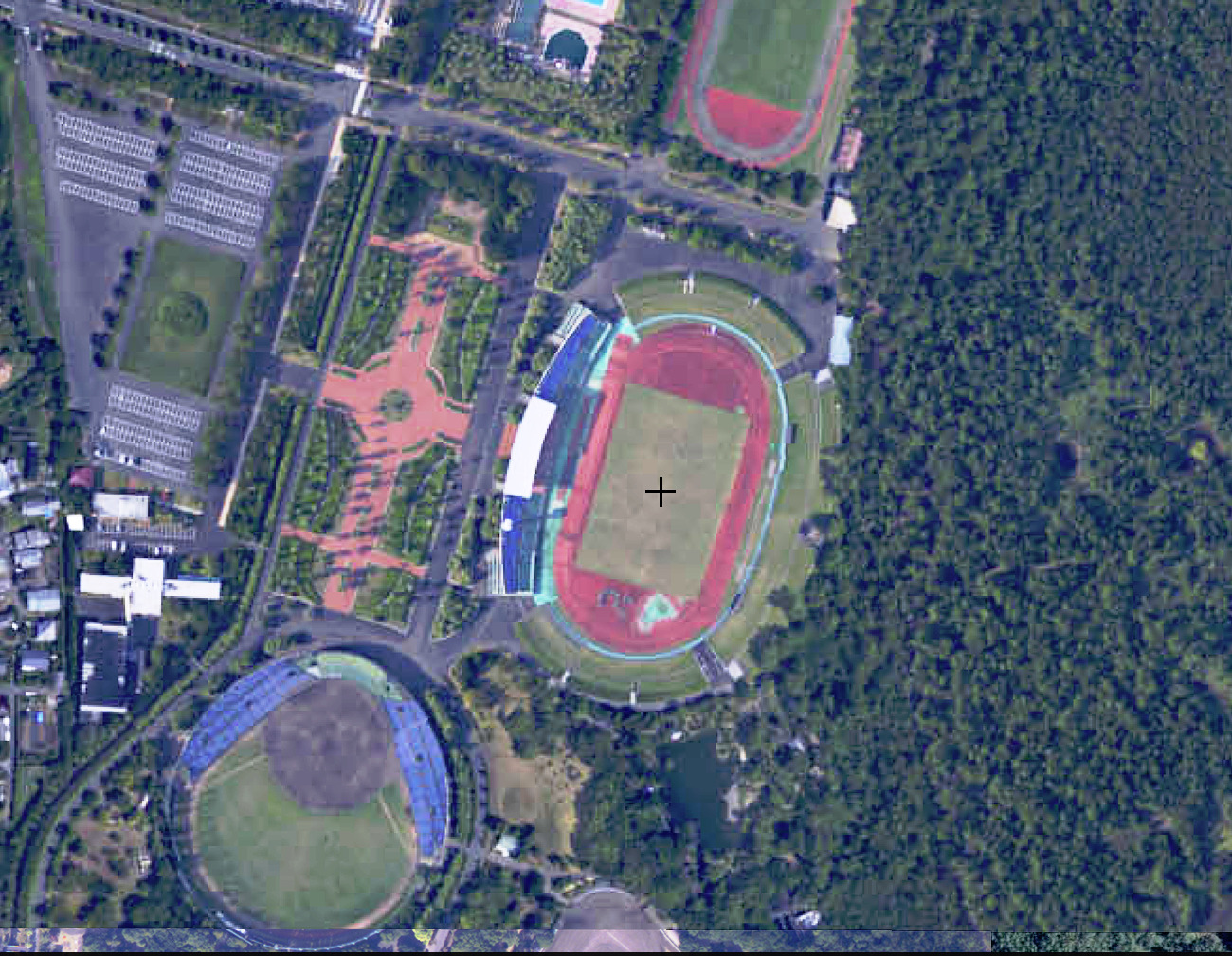
- Interactive map of Miyazaki Prefectural Sports Park Athletics Stadium
- Former names: Miyazaki Athletic Stadium; Kirishima Hibiscus Stadium
- Location: Miyazaki, Miyazaki, Japan
- Coordinates: 31°49′28″N 131°26′53″E
- Owner: Miyazaki Prefecture
- Operator: Miyazaki Sports Facilities Association
- Capacity: 20,000

Construction
- Opened: 1974

Miyazaki Athletic Stadium is an athletic stadium in Miyazaki, Miyazaki, Japan.

== Overview ==
The Miyazaki Prefectural Sports Park Athletics Stadium is an athletics stadium located in the Miyazaki Prefectural Sports Park in Miyazaki City, Miyazaki Prefecture, Japan. The facility is owned by Miyazaki Prefecture, and the Miyazaki Sports Facilities Association operates and manages it as a designated manager. On April 1, 2020 (Reiwa 2), Mera Electric Industry's sponsorship of the entire Miyazaki Prefectural Sports Park and each name change were announced, and the name change to "Hinata Athletic Stadium" was decided.
