= Taiki Yamada =

Japanese footballer (born 2002)

Taiki Yamada 山田 大樹
- Yamada with Kashima Antlers in 2026

Personal information
- Date of birth: 8 January 2002 (age 24)
- Place of birth: Chiba, Japan
- Height: 1.90 m (6 ft 3 in)
- Position: Goalkeeper

Team information
- Current team: Kashima Antlers
- Number: 21

Youth career
- –2020: Kashima Antlers

Senior career*
Years	Team	Apps	(Gls)
2020–	Kashima Antlers	2	(0)
2023	→ Fagiano Okayama (loan)	7	(0)

International career^{‡}
2017	Japan U15	9	(0)
2017–2018	Japan U16	8	(0)
2019	Japan U18	1	(0)
Medal record
Men's football
Representing Japan
Asian Games
Silver medal – second place	2022 Hangzhou	Team
AFC U-23 Asian Cup
Gold medal – first place	2024 Qatar	Team
- * Club domestic league appearances and goals as of 21:11, 23 September 2026 (UTC) ‡ National team caps and goals as of 17:04, 13 November 2020 (UTC)

Taiki Yamada (山田 大樹, Yamada Taiki; born 8 January 2002) is a Japanese footballer who plays as a goalkeeper for club Kashima Antlers.

== Career ==
=== Kashima Antlers ===
On 15 October 2019, Yamada was promoted to the first team from the 2020 season. He made his debut in the J.League Cup on 12 August 2020. Yamada made his league debut against Vissel Kobe on 16 August 2020.

On 8 December 2023, it was announced that Yamada would return to Kashima Antlers for the 2024 season.

=== Loan to Fagiano Okayama ===
On 7 December 2022, Yamada was announced on loan to Fagiano Okayama. He made his league debut against Júbilo Iwata on 18 February 2023.

== International career ==
On 3 September 2018, Yamada was called up to the Japan U16s. On 23 October 2019, he was called up to the Japan U19s for 2020 AFC U-19 Championship qualifying matches. On 10 July 2020, Yamada was called up to the Japan U19s. On 19 March 2021, he was called up to the Japan U20s. On 3 March 2022, Yamada was called up to the Japan U21s.

Yamada was part of the Japan squad for the 2022 Asian Games.

On 4 April 2024, it was announced that Yamada would be part of the Japan squad for the AFC U-23 Asian Cup Qatar 2024.

== Career statistics ==
=== Club ===
As of 23 September 2026.

Appearances and goals by club, season and competition
Club	Season	League			National cup (Note: Includes Emperors Cup)		League cup (Note: Includes J.League Cup)		Total	
Club	Season	Division	Apps	Goals	Apps	Goals	Apps	Goals	Apps	Goals
Kashima Antlers	2020	J1 League	2	0	0	0	1	0	3	0
Kashima Antlers	2021	J1 League	0	0	0	0	0	0	0	0
Kashima Antlers	2022	J1 League	0	0	0	0	0	0	0	0
Kashima Antlers	2024	J1 League	0	0	2	0	0	0	2	0
Kashima Antlers	2025	J1 League	0	0	1	0	0	0	1	0
Kashima Antlers	2026	J1 (100)	0	0	0	0	0	0	0	0
Kashima Antlers	2026–27	J1 League	0	0	2	0	0	0	2	0
Kashima Antlers	Total		2	0	5	0	1	0	8	0
Fagiano Okayama (loan)	2023	J2 League	7	0	1	0	–		8	0
Career total			9	0	6	0	1	0	16	0

== Honours ==
=== Club ===
Kashima Antlers

- J1 League: 2025

=== International ===
Japan U16

- AFC U-16 Championship: 2018

Japan U23

- AFC U-23 Asian Cup: 2024
