= Shuhei Mizoguchi =

Japanese footballer (born 2004)

Shuhei Mizoguchi 溝口 修平
Personal information
- Date of birth: 13 February 2004 (age 22)
- Place of birth: Ibaraki Prefecture, Japan
- Height: 1.74 m (5 ft 9 in)
- Position: Left back

Team information
- Current team: Tokyo Verdy (on loan from Kashima Antlers)
- Number: 18

Youth career
- Kasahara SSS
- –2021: Kashima Antlers

Senior career*
Years	Team	Apps	(Gls)
2022–	Kashima Antlers	24	(0)
2026–	→ Tokyo Verdy (loan)	0	(0)
- * Club domestic league appearances and goals as of 12:24, 4 August 2026 (UTC)

Shuhei Mizoguchi (溝口修平, Mizoguchi Shuhei; born 13 February 2004) is a Japanese professional footballer who plays as a left back for J1 League club Tokyo Verdy, on loan from Kashima Antlers.

== Youth career ==
Mizoguchi made his first appearance for Kashima Antlers Youth (U-18) aged 16 in the Japan Club Youth U-18 Football Championship, making four appearances en route to the semi-final of the competition before being knocked out by Sagan Tosu U-18s. The youth team reached the semi-final of the same competition in 2021, with Mizoguchi playing six games throughout.

== Club career ==
In July 2021 it was announced that Mizoguchi would be joining the first-team squad of Kashima Antlers for the 2022 season. He made his debut on 18 May 2022, coming on as an 83rd minute substitute for Koki Anzai in a 3–1 J.League Cup victory against Gamba Osaka. In June 2022, he made the starting XI for the first time in a 2–1 Emperor's Cup win against Niigata University of Health and Welfare.

In June 2026, Mizoguchi joined J1 League club Tokyo Verdy on loan ahead of the 2026–27 J1 League season.

== Career statistics ==
=== Club ===
As of 4 August 2026

Appearances and goals by club, season and competition
Club	Season	League			National Cup		League Cup		Total	
Club	Season	Division	Apps	Goals	Apps	Goals	Apps	Goals	Apps	Goals
Japan			League		Emperor's Cup		J.League Cup		Total	
Kashima Antlers	2022	J1 League	0	0	2	0	1	0	3	0
Kashima Antlers	2023	J1 League	5	0	1	0	5	0	11	0
Kashima Antlers	2024	J1 League	0	0	0	0	0	0	0	0
Kashima Antlers	2025	J1 League	10	0	2	0	1	0	13	0
Kashima Antlers	2026	J1 (100)	9	0	–		–		9	0
Career total			24	0	5	0	7	0	36	0

== International career ==
In March 2022, Mizoguchi was called up to the Japan U-19 squad.

== Honours ==
=== Club ===
Kashima Antlers

- J1 League: 2025
