= 2021 Kashima Antlers season =

Kashima Antlers
2021 season
- Chairman: Fumiaki Koizumi
- Manager: Antônio Carlos Zago (until 13 April); Naoki Soma (interim) (until 5 December)
- Stadium: Kashima Soccer Stadium
- J1 League: 4th
- Emperor's Cup: Quarter finals
- J.League Cup: Quarter finals
- Top goalscorer: League: Ayase Ueda (14 goals); All: Ayase Ueda (19 goals)
- Highest home attendance: 16,518 (v. Urawa Reds, J1 League, 7 November 2021)
- Lowest home attendance: 3,586 (v. Gamba Osaka, J1 League, 18 September 2021)
- Biggest win: 8–1 (v. YSCC Yokohama, Emperor's Cup, 16 June 2021)
- Biggest defeat: 0–3 (v. Avispa Fukuoka, J1 League, 11 September 2021)
Home colours	Away colours	Third colours

The 2021 season was Kashima Antlers' 29th consecutive season in the J1 League, the top flight of Japanese football since the introduction of professional football in 1993. The club finished the 2021 J1 League in fourth place, one place above their position from the previous season. They also competed in the Emperor's Cup and J.League Cup and reached the quarter-finals of both competitions.

After a poor start to the season losing four of their first six league games, manager Antônio Carlos Zago was dismissed in April 2021 and was replaced by Naoki Soma as interim manager who would take control until the end of the season.

== Squad ==
=== Season squad ===
Squad no.	Name	Nationality	Position(s)	Date of birth (age at start of season)
Goalkeepers
1	Kwoun Sun-tae	(South Korea)	GK	11 September 1984 (aged 36)
29	Tomoki Hayakawa	(Japan)	GK	3 March 1999 (aged 21)
31	Yuya Oki	(Japan)	GK	22 August 1999 (aged 21)
38	Taiki Yamada	(Japan)	GK	8 January 2002 (aged 19)
Defenders
2	Koki Anzai	(Japan)	RB / LB	31 May 1995 (aged 25)
14	Katsuya Nagato	(Japan)	LB	15 January 1995 (aged 26)
22	Rikuto Hirose	(Japan)	RB	23 September 1995 (aged 25)
23	Naoki Hayashi	(Japan)	CB	9 June 1998 (aged 22)
28	Koki Machida	(Japan)	CB	25 August 1997 (aged 23)
32	Keigo Tsunemoto	(Japan)	RB / CB	21 October 1998 (aged 22)
33	Ikuma Sekigawa	(Japan)	CB	13 September 2000 (aged 20)
39	Tomoya Inukai	(Japan)	CB	12 May 1993 (aged 27)
Midfielders
4	Léo Silva	(Brazil)	DM	24 December 1985 (aged 35)
6	Ryota Nagaki	(Japan)	DM	4 June 1988 (aged 32)
7	Juan Alano	(Brazil)	RM / AM / SS	2 September 1996 (aged 24)
11	Ryuji Izumi	(Japan)	LM / RW	6 November 1993 (aged 27)
17	Arthur Caíke	(Brazil)	LW / FW	15 June 1992 (aged 28)
20	Kento Misao (c)	(Japan)	DM	16 April 1996 (aged 24)
21	Diego Pituca	(Brazil)	CM	15 August 1992 (aged 28)
24	Yusuke Ogawa	(Japan)	DM / CM	14 April 2002 (aged 18)
25	Yasushi Endo	(Japan)	RM / RW	7 April 1988 (aged 32)
26	Naoki Suto	(Japan)	LM / RM	1 October 2002 (aged 18)
27	Yuta Matsumura	(Japan)	RM / LM	13 April 2001 (aged 19)
34	Yu Funabashi	(Japan)	DM	12 July 2002 (aged 18)
Forwards
8	Shoma Doi	(Japan)	SS / LW / RW	21 May 1992 (aged 28)
9	Everaldo	(Brazil)	FW	5 July 1991 (aged 29)
13	Ryotaro Araki	(Japan)	FW / LW / RW	29 January 2002 (aged 19)
18	Ayase Ueda	(Japan)	FW	28 August 1998 (aged 22)
19	Itsuki Someno	(Japan)	FW	12 September 2001 (aged 19)

Last updated: 20 July 2021.
Source: Soccer D.B.

== Transfers ==
=== Arrivals ===
Date	Position	Player	From	Type	Source
12 January 2021	MF	(Brazil) Arthur Caíke	(Saudi Arabia) Al-Shabab	Full	
15 January 2021	MF	(Brazil) Diego Pituca	(Brazil) Santos FC	Full	
1 February 2021	MF	(Japan) Yusuke Ogawa	(Japan) Shohei High School	Full	
1 February 2021	MF	(Japan) Naoki Suto	(Japan) Shohei High School	Full	
17 February 2021	DF	(Japan) Keigo Tsunemoto	(Japan) Meiji University	Full	
17 February 2021	GK	(Japan) Tomoki Hayakawa	(Japan) Meiji University	Full	
17 February 2021	DF	(Japan) Naoki Hayashi	(Japan) Osaka University of H&SS	Full	
19 July 2021	DF	(Japan) Koki Anzai	(Portugal) Portimonense	Full	
24 July 2021	DF	(Brazil) Bueno	(Brazil) Atlético Mineiro	Return from loan	

=== Departures ===
Date	Position	Player	To	Type	Source
23 December 2020	DF	(Japan) Shuto Yamamoto	(Japan) Shonan Bellmare	Full	
24 December 2020	GK	(Japan) Hitoshi Sogahata		Retired	
28 December 2020	DF	(Japan) Itsuki Oda	(Japan) JEF United Chiba	Loan	
29 December 2020	DF	(Japan) Yukitoshi Ito	(Japan) JEF United Chiba	Full	
5 January 2021	FW	(Brazil) Leandro	(Japan) FC Tokyo	Full	
13 January 2021	FW	(Japan) Kazuma Yamaguchi	(Japan) Matsumoto Yamaga	Full	
15 January 2021	FW	(Japan) Sho Ito	(Japan) Yokohama FC	Full	
18 January 2021	DF	(Japan) Tatsuki Nara	(Japan) Avispa Fukuoka	Loan	
1 February 2021	MF	(Japan) Shintaro Nago	(Japan) Shonan Bellmare	Loan	
10 August 2021	DF	(Japan) Daiki Sugioka	(Japan) Shonan Bellmare	Loan	
10 August 2021	MF	(Japan) Kei Koizumi	(Japan) Sagan Tosu	Full	
11 August 2021	MF	(Japan) Ryōhei Shirasaki	(Japan) Sagan Tosu	Loan	

== Competitions ==
=== J1 League ===
==== League table ====
Pos	Team	Pld	W	D	L	GF	GA	GD	Pts	Qualification or relegation
2	Yokohama F. Marinos	38	24	7	7	82	35	+47	79	Qualification for the AFC Champions League group stage
3	Vissel Kobe	38	21	10	7	62	36	+26	73	Qualification for the AFC Champions League play-off round
4	Kashima Antlers	38	21	6	11	62	36	+26	69	
5	Nagoya Grampus	38	19	9	10	44	30	+14	66	
6	Urawa Red Diamonds	38	18	9	11	45	38	+7	63 (Note: The JPFL awarded a 3–0 win to Shonan Bellmare after Urawa Red Diamonds fielded Zion Suzuki who was an ineligible player. The original score was 3–2 for Shonan Bellmare.)	Qualification for the AFC Champions League group stage (Note: Qualified as the 2021 Emperor's Cup winners.)

Source: J.League Data Site
Rules for classification: 1) Points; 2) Goal difference; 3) Goals scored; 4) Head-to-head points; 5) Head-to-head goal difference; 6) Head-to-head goal scored; 7) Fair-play points.

==== Results summary ====
Overall								Home						Away					
Pld	W	D	L	GF	GA	GD	Pts	W	D	L	GF	GA	GD	W	D	L	GF	GA	GD
38	21	6	11	62	36	+26	69	10	4	5	32	20	+12	11	2	6	30	16	+14

Last updated: 4 December 2021.
Source: J.League data site

==== Results by matchday ====
Round	1	2	3	4	5	6	7	8	9	10	11	12	13	14	15	16	17	18	19	20	21	22	23	24	25	26	27	28	29	30	31	32	33	34	35	36	37	38
Ground	H	H	H	A	H	A	H	A	A	H	A	H	A	H	A	H	A	H	A	H	A	A	A	H	A	A	A	H	H	H	A	H	A	A	H	H	H	A
Result	L	W	D	L	L	L	W	D	W	D	W	W	W	W	L	W	L	D	D	W	L	W	W	W	L	W	W	L	W	L	W	L	W	W	W	D	W	W
Position	17	13	11	14	15	16	14	15	12	13	10	9	7	6	7	6	8	8	9	7	8	6	5	3	6	5	3	7	7	6	6	6	6	5	4	5	4	4

Updated to match(es) played on 4 December 2021. Source: J. League data site
A = Away; H = Home; W = Win; D = Draw; L = Loss

==== Results ====
27 February 2021 1	Kashima Antlers	1–3	Shimizu S-Pulse	Kashima
15:03 JST	Araki 75'	Report	Thiago Santana 78'; Goto 83'; Ueda 88' (o.g.)	Stadium: Kashima Soccer Stadium; Attendance: 9,312; Referee: Hajime Matsuo

10 March 2021 2	Kashima Antlers	3–1	Shonan Bellmare	Kashima
19:03 JST	Araki 3', 60'; Hirose (yellow card) 53'; Machida 89'	Report	Ohno (yellow card) 73'; Okamoto 86'	Stadium: Kashima Soccer Stadium; Attendance: 4,546; Referee: Ryuji Sato
Note: Gameweek 3

13 March 2021 3	Kashima Antlers	1–1	Sanfrecce Hiroshima	Kashima
16:03 JST	Silva (yellow card) 25'; Araki 75'; Sugioka (yellow card) 90+4'	Report	Asano 30'	Stadium: Kashima Soccer Stadium; Attendance: 6,829; Referee: Nobutsugu Murakami
Note: Gameweek 4

17 March 2021 4	Avispa Fukuoka	1–0	Kashima Antlers	Fukuoka
18:03 JST	Shigehiro (yellow card) 60'; Kanamori 85'; Mae (yellow card) 88'	Report	Sekigawa (red card) 37'; Hirose (yellow card) 56'; Machida (yellow card) 61'; Nagato (yellow card) 71'; Matsumura (yellow card) 90+6'	Stadium: Best Denki Stadium; Attendance: 4,510; Referee: Yoshiro Imamura
Note: Gameweek 5

21 March 2021 5	Kashima Antlers	0–1	Nagoya Grampus	Kashima
16:03 JST	Koizumi (yellow card) 56'; Araki (yellow card) 63'; Inukai (yellow card) 66' (yellow-red card) 82'; Machida (yellow card) 90+2'; Everaldo (yellow card) 90+5'	Report	Inagaki 59'; Yonemoto (yellow card) 90+5'	Stadium: Kashima Soccer Stadium; Attendance: 7,809; Referee: Hiroyuki Kimura
Note: Gameweek 6

3 April 2021 6	Urawa Red Diamonds	2–1	Kashima Antlers	Saitama
15:04 JST	Yamanaka (yellow card) 19'; Akimoto 37'; Makino 66' (pen.)	Report	Ueda (yellow card) 39'; Sekigawa 45+2'; Tsunemoto (yellow card) 63'; Funabashi (yellow card) 90+4'	Stadium: Saitama Stadium 2002; Attendance: 9,975; Referee: Yusuke Araki
Note: Gameweek 7

7 April 2021 7	Kashima Antlers	2–1	Kashiwa Reysol	Kashima
19:01 JST	Everaldo (yellow card) 33'; Ueda 63'; Shirasaki 88'; Misao (yellow card) 90+4'	Report	Ominami (yellow card) 13'; Nakama (yellow card) 49' (goal) 65'	Stadium: Kashima Soccer Stadium; Attendance: 4,550; Referee: Hajime Matsuo
Note: Gameweek 8

11 April 2021 8	Consadole Sapporo	2–2	Kashima Antlers	Sapporo
13:08 JST	Tanaka 26'	Report	Nagato 9'; Ueda 20'; Misao (yellow card) 79'	Stadium: Sapporo Dome; Attendance: 10,342; Referee: Hayato Shimizu
Note: Gameweek 9. Zago's last game in charge

17 April 2021 9	Tokushima Vortis	0–1	Kashima Antlers	Tokushima
14:03 JST	Iwao (yellow card) 45+3'	Report	Machida 31'; Silva (yellow card) 87'	Stadium: Pocari Sweat Stadium; Attendance: 5,748; Referee: Akihiko Ikeuchi
Note: Gameweek 10

24 April 2021 10	Kashima Antlers	1–1	Vissel Kobe	Kashima
17:03 JST	Ueda 64'	Report	Furuhashi 28'	Stadium: Kashima Soccer Stadium; Attendance: 10,223; Referee: Koichiro Fukushima
Note: Gameweek 11

1 May 2021 11	Yokohama FC	0–3	Kashima Antlers	Yokohama
19:03 JST	Maejima (yellow card) 71'	Report	Shirasaki 12'; Doi 45+2'; Machida 80'	Stadium: NHK Spring Mitsuzawa Football Stadium; Attendance: 4,896; Referee: Ryo Tanimoto
Note: Gameweek 12

9 May 2021 12	Kashima Antlers	3–0	FC Tokyo	Kashima
17:01 JST	Machida 22'; Matsumura 45'; Ueda 87'	Report		Stadium: Kashima Soccer Stadium; Attendance: 7,346; Referee: Nobutsugu Murakami
Note: Gameweek 13

12 May 2021 13	Nagoya Grampus	0–2	Kashima Antlers	Toyota
19:03 JST	Nakatani (yellow card) 90+3'	Report	Inukai 32'; Sugioka 86'	Stadium: Toyota Stadium; Attendance: 4,844; Referee: Koichiro Fukushima
Note: Gameweek 21

15 May 2021 14	Kashima Antlers	5–3	Yokohama F. Marinos	Kashima
15:03 JST	Doi 40', 46', 53' (pen.); Tsunemoto (yellow card) 43' (yellow-red card) 86'; Araki 55'; Ueda 77'	Report	Onaiwu 25', 74'; Ohgihara (yellow card) 29'; Élber (yellow card) 41'; Amano 90'	Stadium: Kashima Soccer Stadium; Attendance: 11,630; Referee: Yudai Yamamoto

22 May 2021 15	Sagan Tosu	2–1	Kashima Antlers	Tosu
14:03 JST	Eduardo (yellow card) 41'; Yamashita 50'; Higuchi 79'; Hwang (yellow card) 87'	Report	Matsumura 14'	Stadium: Ekimae Real Estate Stadium; Attendance: 7,079; Referee: Hayato Shimizu

26 May 2021 16	Kashima Antlers	1–0	Cerezo Osaka	Kashima
19:03 JST	Inukai (yellow card) 31'; Araki 72'	Report	Maruhashi (yellow card) 50'	Stadium: Kashima Soccer Stadium; Attendance: 5,977; Referee: Akihiko Ikeuchi

30 May 2021 17	Kawasaki Frontale	2–1	Kashima Antlers	Kawasaki
19:01 JST	Damião 19'; Jesiel (yellow card) 41'; Kobayashi 90+4'	Report	Ueda 61'; Nagato (yellow card) 90+2'	Stadium: Kawasaki Todoroki Stadium; Attendance: 4,958; Referee: Yuichi Nishimura

20 June 2021 18	Kashima Antlers	1–1	Vegalta Sendai	Kashima
17:03 JST	Pituca (yellow card) 65'; Inukai (yellow card) 84'; Alano 90+7'	Report	Nishimura 63'; Stojišić (yellow card) 90+5'	Stadium: Kashima Soccer Stadium; Attendance: 9,312; Referee: Koei Koya

23 June 2021 19	Oita Trinita	0–0	Kashima Antlers	Ōita
19:03 JST		Report	Machida (yellow card) 33'	Stadium: Showa Denko Dome Oita; Attendance: 4,208; Referee: Akihiko Ikeuchi

27 June 2021 20	Kashima Antlers	4–0	Consadole Sapporo	Kashima
18:33 JST	Inukai 10'; Pituca 48'; Tsunemoto 63'; Everaldo 68'	Report		Stadium: Kashima Soccer Stadium; Attendance: 7,953; Referee: Koichiro Fukushima

11 July 2021 21	Kashiwa Reysol	2–1	Kashima Antlers	Kashiwa
19:03 JST	Richardson (yellow card) 16'; Raúl (yellow card) 45+1' (goal) 57'; Cristiano 53'	Report	Misao (yellow card) 56'; Inukai (yellow card) 65' (goal) 89'; Everaldo (yellow card) 83'	Stadium: Sankyo Frontier Kashiwa Stadium; Attendance: 3,854; Referee: Yusuke Araki
Note: Gameweek 22

24 July 2021 22	Gamba Osaka	0–1	Kashima Antlers	Suita
19:03 JST	Yajima (yellow card) 37'	Report	Arthur 72'	Stadium: Panasonic Stadium Suita; Attendance: 4,961; Referee: Hajime Matsuo
Note: Gameweek 2

9 August 2021 23	Shonan Bellmare	1–2	Kashima Antlers	Hiratsuka
19:03 JST	Ohashi 13'	Report	Inukai 29', 90+2'; Silva (yellow card) 67'; Nagato (yellow card) 89'	Stadium: Lemon Gas Stadium Hiratsuka; Attendance: 4,473; Referee: Takuto Okabe

15 August 2021 24	Kashima Antlers	3–0	Tokushima Vortis	Kashima
18:33 JST	Araki 5', 80'; Machida 90'	Report	Dušan (yellow card) 3'; Suzuki (yellow card) 59'	Stadium: Kashima Soccer Stadium; Attendance: 7,139; Referee: Ryuji Sato

21 August 2021 25	Vissel Kobe	1–0	Kashima Antlers	Kobe
18:03 JST	Yamaguchi 79'	Report	Pituca (yellow card) 43'; Inukai (yellow card) 80'	Stadium: Noevir Stadium Kobe; Attendance: 6,426; Referee: Yoshiro Imamura

25 August 2021 26	Shimizu S-Pulse	0–4	Kashima Antlers	Shizuoka
19:03 JST	Ibusuki (yellow card) 68'; Fujimoto (yellow card) 72'	Report	Ueda 18'; Arthur 44'; Izumi 81'; Endo 88'	Stadium: IAI Stadium Nihondaira; Attendance: 4,356; Referee: Jumpei Iida

28 August 2021 27	Yokohama F. Marinos	0–2	Kashima Antlers	Yokohama
19:04 JST	Wada (yellow card) 84'	Report	Araki 15'; Ueda 30'	Stadium: Nissan Stadium; Attendance: 4,892; Referee: Yuichi Nishimura

11 September 2021 28	Kashima Antlers	0–3	Avispa Fukuoka	Kashima
18:04 JST	Pituca (yellow card) 88'	Report	Juanma 26', 41'; Grolli (yellow card) 35'; Yamagishi 64'; Croux (yellow card) 78'	Stadium: Kashima Soccer Stadium; Attendance: 0 (Note: Match played behind closed doors); Referee: Ryo Tanimoto

18 September 2021 29	Kashima Antlers	3–1	Gamba Osaka	Kashima
18:03 JST	Alano (yellow card) 34' (goal) 60'; Ueda 52'; Doi 73'	Report	Kim (yellow card) 47'; Tiago Alves 80' (pen.); Suganuma (yellow card) 84'	Stadium: Kashima Soccer Stadium; Attendance: 3,586; Referee: Akihiko Ikeuchi

22 September 2021 30	Kashima Antlers	1–2	Kawasaki Frontale	Kashima
19:03 JST	Alano 61'; Arthur (yellow card) 90+5'	Report	Yamamura 83'; Miyagi 90+4'	Stadium: Kashima Soccer Stadium; Attendance: 4,925; Referee: Hiroyuki Kimura
Note: Gameweek 32

26 September 2021 31	Cerezo Osaka	1–2	Kashima Antlers	Osaka
15:03 JST	Okubo (yellow card) 35'; Harakawa 58'	Report	Anzai (yellow card) 18'; Ueda 66', 82' (pen.)	Stadium: Yanmar Stadium Nagai; Attendance: 4,912; Referee: Yudai Yamamoto
Note: Gameweek 30

2 October 2021 32	Kashima Antlers	1–2	Yokohama FC	Kashima
16:03 JST	Hirose (yellow card) 45+3'; Ueda 46'; Everaldo (yellow card) 90+3'	Report	Seko 17' (yellow card) 58'; Germain 42'; Gabriel (yellow card) 90'; Han (yellow card) 90+5'	Stadium: Kashima Soccer Stadium; Attendance: 7,208; Referee: Yoshiro Imamura
Note: Gameweek 31

23 October 2021 33	FC Tokyo	1–2	Kashima Antlers	Chōfu
14:03 JST	Watanabe 75'; Tsuyoshi Kodama (yellow card) 90'; Oumari (yellow card) 90+2'	Report	Arthur 45+1'; Ueda 65'	Stadium: Ajinomoto Stadium; Attendance: 9,748; Referee: Takuto Okabe

3 November 2021 34	Sanfrecce Hiroshima	1–4	Kashima Antlers	Hiroshima
15:03 JST	Ezequiel 34'; Fujii (yellow card) 45+2'; Nogami (yellow card) 45+5'; Sasaki (yellow card) 65'	Report	Arthur 3', 50'; Tsunemoto 28'; Sekigawa (yellow card) 45+5'; Araki 71' (pen.)	Stadium: Edion Stadium Hiroshima; Attendance: 9,626; Referee: Yuichi Nishimura

7 November 2021 35	Kashima Antlers	1–0	Urawa Red Diamonds	Kashima
14:03 JST	Doi 36'; Arthur (yellow card) 51'; Everaldo (yellow card) 87'	Report	Hirano (yellow card) 50'	Stadium: Kashima Soccer Stadium; Attendance: 16,518; Referee: Jumpei Iida

20 November 2021 36	Kashima Antlers	0–0	Oita Trinita	Kashima
15:03 JST	Misao (yellow card) 52'	Report	Goya (yellow card) 43'	Stadium: Kashima Soccer Stadium; Attendance: 11,035; Referee: Yoshiro Imamura

27 November 2021 37	Kashima Antlers	1–0	Sagan Tosu	Kashima
14:04 JST	Ueda 14' (yellow card) 65'; Silva (yellow card) 72'	Report		Stadium: Kashima Soccer Stadium; Attendance: 12,645; Referee: Yusuke Araki

4 December 2021 38	Vegalta Sendai	0–1	Kashima Antlers	Sendai
14:03 JST		Report	Misao (yellow card) 61'; Pituca 73' (yellow card) 74'; Everaldo (yellow card) 90+3'	Stadium: Yurtec Stadium Sendai; Attendance: 8,569; Referee: Hajime Matsuo

=== Emperor's Cup ===
After comfortably beating lower division teams in the early rounds of the tournament, Kashima were beaten comfortably 3–1 by Kawasaki Frontale in the quarter-finals, with Ryotaro Araki scoring a 90th minute consolation goal. With five goals in four games, Everaldo ended up as the top scorer in the whole tournament, in spite of Kashima not making it past the quarter-final stage.

16 June 2021 Second round	Kashima Antlers	8–1	YSCC Yokohama	Kashima, Ibaraki
19:00 JST	Endo 10', 31'; Everaldo Stum 12', 49'; Matsumura 21'; Ueda 52', 70', 78'	Report	Ogochukwu 83'	Stadium: Kashima Soccer Stadium; Attendance: 2,458; Referee: Yudai Yamamoto

7 July 2021 Third round	Kashima Antlers	3–0	Tochigi SC	Utsunomiya, Tochigi
19:00 JST	Everaldo Stum 80', 90'; Arthur Caíke 90+2'	Report		Stadium: Kanseki Stadium Tochigi; Attendance: 4,442; Referee: Jumpei Iida

18 August 2021 Fourth round	Kashima Antlers	3–1	V-Varen Nagasaki	Isahaya, Nagasaki
19:00 JST	Arthur Caíke 50'; Everaldo 60'; Hayashi 74'	Report	Maikuma 7'	Stadium: Transcosmos Stadium Nagasaki; Attendance: 3,357; Referee: Yudai Yamamoto

27 October 2021 Quarter-finals	Kawasaki Frontale	3–1	Kashima Antlers	Kawasaki, Kanagawa
18:00 JST	Machida 32' (o.g.); Hatate 48'; Wakizaka 51'	Report	Araki 90'	Stadium: Todoroki Athletics Stadium; Attendance: 9,776; Referee: Nobutsugu Murakami

=== J.League Cup ===
Kashima were drawn into Group A as the team that finished fifth in the league in 2020 – the four teams above them received byes from the group stage of the cup. They were unbeaten in the group stage with three wins and three draws. At the play-off stage, Kashima went onto beat Shimizu S-Pulse in both legs of the tie, but were knocked out at the quarter-final stage by eventual champions Nagoya Grampus. Like the Emperor's Cup, Everaldo was the highest scorer for Kashima in this competition, scoring three goals in six appearances.

==== Group stage ====
Pos	Team	Pld	W	D	L	GF	GA	GD	Pts	Qualification	ANT	CON	AVI	SAG
1	Kashima Antlers	6	3	3	0	14	4	+10	12	Advanced to play-off stage	—	3–0	1–1	3–0
2	Consadole Sapporo	6	3	2	1	11	8	+3	11	Advanced to play-off stage	0–0	—	1–1	2–1
3	Avispa Fukuoka	6	2	2	2	10	11	−1	8		1–5	2–3	—	4–1
4	Sagan Tosu	6	0	1	5	5	17	−12	1		2–2	1–5	0–1	—

Source: Table, Results
Legend: Blue = home team win; Yellow = draw; Red = away team win.

3 March 2021	Kashima Antlers	3–0	Sagan Tosu	Kashima
19:03 JST	Everaldo 10'; Izumi 64'; Someno 71'	Report		Stadium: Kashima Soccer Stadium; Attendance: 3,784; Referee: Hayato Shimizu

27 March 2021	Avispa Fukuoka	1–5	Kashima Antlers	Fukuoka
18:03 JST	Carlos 75'	Report	Ueda 9', 35'; Araki 28'; Everaldo 61'; Hirose 90+1'	Stadium: Best Denki Stadium; Attendance: 3,964; Referee: Ryo Tanimoto

20 April 2021	Kashima Antlers	3–0	Consadole Sapporo	Kashima
19:03 JST	Matsumura 32'; Araki 39'; Shirasaki 81'	Report		Stadium: Kashima Soccer Stadium; Attendance: 4,477; Referee: Hiroyoshi Takayama

28 April 2021	Sagan Tosu	2–2	Kashima Antlers	Tosu
19:03 JST	Ofoedu 14'; Yuzawa 73'	Report	Sugioka 29'; Sagara 45+1' (o.g.)	Stadium: Ekimae Real Estate Stadium; Attendance: 3,402; Referee: Yoshiro Imamura

5 May 2021	Kashima Antlers	1–1	Avispa Fukuoka	Kashima
15:03 JST	Shirasaki 31'	Report	Mary 24'	Stadium: Kashima Soccer Stadium; Attendance: 8,343; Referee: Futoshi Nakamura

19 May 2021	Consadole Sapporo	0–0	Kashima Antlers	Sapporo
19:03 JST		Report		Stadium: Sapporo Dome; Attendance: 2,829; Referee: Yoshiro Imamura

==== Play-off stage ====
2 June 2021 Play-off Leg 1	Shimizu S-Pulse	0–1	Kashima Antlers	Shizuoka
19:03 JST		Report	Hayashi 8'	Stadium: IAI Stadium Nihondaira; Attendance: 3,626; Referee: Futoshi Nakamura

6 June 2021 Play-off Leg 2	Kashima Antlers	2–1	Shimizu S-Pulse	Kashima
15:03 JST	Juan Alano 45'; Everaldo 71'	Report	Thiago Santana 21'	Stadium: Kashima Soccer Stadium; Attendance: 7,274; Referee: Yoshiro Imamura

Kashima Antlers won 3–1 on aggregate.

==== Quarter-finals ====
1 September 2021 Quarter-final Leg 1	Nagoya Grampus	2–0	Kashima Antlers	Toyota
19:03 JST	Kakitani 13'; Inagaki 53'	Report		Stadium: Toyota Stadium; Attendance: 5,744; Referee: Nobutsugu Murakami

5 September 2021 Quarter-final Leg 2	Kashima Antlers	0–2	Nagoya Grampus	Kashima
18:03 JST	Inagaki 22'; Świerczok 57'	Report		Stadium: Kashima Soccer Stadium; Attendance: 0 Referee: Yoshiro Imamura

Nagoya Grampus won 4–0 on aggregate.

== Statistics ==
=== Appearances ===
Last updated: 20 January 2022.
Source: jleague.co, Soccer D.B.

No.	Pos.	Name	J1 League		Emperor's Cup		J.League Cup		Total	
No.	Pos.	Name	Apps	Goals	Apps	Goals	Apps	Goals	Apps	Goals
Goalkeepers
1	GK	(South Korea) Kwoun Sun-tae	5	0	1	0	7	0	13	0
29	GK	(Japan) Tomoki Hayakawa	0	0	1	0	0	0	1	0
31	GK	(Japan) Yuya Oki	33	0	3	0	2	0	38	0
Defenders
2	DF	(Japan) Koki Anzai	12+4	0	2	0	1+1	0	20	0
14	DF	(Japan) Katsuya Nagato	22+7	1	0+1	0	3+2	0	35	1
22	DF	(Japan) Rikuto Hirose	7+8	0	0+1	0	6+1	1	17	1
23	DF	(Japan) Naoki Hayashi	5+1	0	3	1	7+1	1	17	2
28	DF	(Japan) Koki Machida	34	5	2	0	1+2	0	39	5
32	DF	(Japan) Keigo Tsunemoto	25+1	2	4	0	4+3	0	37	2
33	DF	(Japan) Ikuma Sekigawa	13	1	1	0	7	0	21	1
39	DF	(Japan) Tomoya Inukai	23+6	5	2	0	5+1	0	37	5
Midfielders
4	MF	(Brazil) Léo Silva	20+9	0	1+1	0	2+2	0	35	0
6	MF	(Japan) Ryota Nagaki	5+10	0	1+1	0	5+1	0	23	0
7	MF	(Brazil) Juan Alano	21+6	3	1+1	0	3+1	1	33	4
11	MF	(Japan) Ryuji Izumi	12+11	1	1+2	0	2+1	1	29	2
17	MF	(Brazil) Arthur Caíke	5+9	5	2+2	2	3+1	0	22	7
20	MF	(Japan) Kento Misao	29+5	0	1+1	0	4+3	0	43	0
21	MF	(Brazil) Diego Pituca	21+5	2	4	0	5+2	0	37	2
25	MF	(Japan) Yasushi Endo	2+21	1	2+1	2	6+3	0	35	3
26	MF	(Japan) Naoki Suto	0	0	0	0	0+2	0	2	0
27	MF	(Japan) Yuta Matsumura	6+16	2	2+1	1	2+6	1	33	4
34	MF	(Japan) Yu Funabashi	1+1	0	0	0	2+1	0	5	0
Forwards
8	FW	(Japan) Shoma Doi	28+8	6	2+1	0	4+2	0	36	6
9	FW	(Brazil) Everaldo	17+11	1	3+1	5	4+2	3	38	9
13	FW	(Japan) Ryotaro Araki	27+9	10	1+2	1	4+3	2	45	13
18	FW	(Japan) Ayase Ueda	19+10	14	1+2	3	4	2	36	19
19	FW	(Japan) Itsuki Someno	1+8	0	0	0	3+2	1	14	1
Players loaned or transferred out during the season
5	DF	(Japan) Daiki Sugioka	5+2	1	2	0	6+1	1	16	2
15	DF	(Brazil) Bueno	1	0	0	0	0	0	1	0
37	MF	(Japan) Kei Koizumi	8+9	0	1	0	3+2	0	23	0
41	MF	(Japan) Ryōhei Shirasaki	11+6	2	1	0	4+1	2	23	4

=== Goalscorers ===
The list is sorted by shirt number when total goals are equal.

Rnk	Pos	No.	Player	J1 League	Emperor's Cup	J.League Cup	Total
1	FW	18	(Japan) Ayase Ueda	14	3	2	19
2	FW	13	(Japan) Ryotaro Araki	10	1	2	13
3	FW	9	(Brazil) Everaldo	1	5	3	9
4	MF	17	(Brazil) Arthur Caíke	5	2	0	7
5	FW	8	(Japan) Shoma Doi	6	0	0	6
6	DF	28	(Japan) Koki Machida	5	0	0	5
6	DF	39	(Japan) Tomoya Inukai	5	0	0	5
8	MF	7	(Brazil) Juan Alano	3	0	1	4
8	MF	27	(Japan) Yuta Matsumura	2	1	1	4
8	MF	41	(Japan) Ryōhei Shirasaki	2	0	2	4
11	MF	25	(Japan) Yasushi Endo	1	2	0	3
12	DF	5	(Japan) Daiki Sugioka	1	0	1	2
12	MF	11	(Japan) Ryuji Izumi	1	0	1	2
12	MF	21	(Brazil) Diego Pituca	2	0	0	2
12	DF	23	(Japan) Naoki Hayashi	0	1	1	2
12	DF	32	(Japan) Keigo Tsunemoto	2	0	0	2
17	DF	14	(Japan) Katsuya Nagato	1	0	0	1
17	FW	19	(Japan) Itsuki Someno	0	0	1	1
17	DF	22	(Japan) Rikuto Hirose	0	0	1	1
17	DF	33	(Japan) Ikuma Sekigawa	1	0	0	1
TOTALS				62	15	16	93

Last updated: 20 January 2022.
Source: jleague.co, besoccer.com

=== Clean sheets ===
The list is sorted by shirt number when total clean sheets are equal.

Rnk	No.	Player	J1 League	Emperor's Cup	J. League Cup	Total
1	31	(Japan) Yuya Oki	11	1	1	13
2	1	(South Korea) Kwoun Sun-tae	4	0	2	6
TOTALS			15	1	3	19

Last updated: 20 January 2022.
Source: fbref.com
