= 2025 Kashima Antlers season =

Kashima Antlers
2025 season
- Chairman: Fumiaki Koizumi
- Manager: Toru Oniki
- Stadium: Kashima Soccer Stadium
- J1 League: 1st (champions)
- Emperor's Cup: Quarter-finals
- J.League Cup: First round
- Top goalscorer: League: Léo Ceará (21); All: Léo Ceará (21)
- Highest home attendance: 59,574; Kashima Antlers 2–1 Kawasaki Frontale (11 May 2025)
- Lowest home attendance: 12,106; Kashima Antlers 2–1 Albirex Niigata (26 February 2025)
- Average home league attendance: 27,401
- Biggest win: 4–0 3 matches
- Biggest defeat: Machida Zelvia 3–0 Kashima Antlers (27 August 2025)
Home colours	Away colours

The 2025 season was Kashima Antlers' 33rd consecutive season in the J1 League, the top flight of Japanese football since the introduction of professional football in 1993. As well as the domestic league, they competed in the Emperor's Cup and the J.League Cup. This was Kashima's first season under new manager Toru Oniki, who was appointed in December 2024.

On 6 December 2025, Kashima were crowned J1 League champions after a 2–1 home victory over Yokohama F.Marinos on the final day of the season. This was their first league title since 2016 and a record-extending ninth league title.

== Squad ==
=== Season squad ===
Squad no.	Name	Nationality	Position(s)	Date of birth (age at start of season)
Goalkeepers
1	Tomoki Hayakawa	(Japan)	GK	3 March 1999 (aged 25)
21	Taiki Yamada	(Japan)	GK	8 January 2002 (aged 23)
29	Yuji Kajikawa	(Japan)	GK	26 July 1991 (aged 33)
38	Park Eui-jeong	(South Korea)	GK	22 May 2004 (aged 20)
Defenders
2	Koki Anzai	(Japan)	RB / LB	31 May 1995 (aged 29)
3	Kim Tae-hyeon	(South Korea)	CB	17 September 2000 (aged 24)
4	Kaito Chida	(Japan)	CB	17 October 1994 (aged 30)
5	Ikuma Sekigawa	(Japan)	CB	13 September 2000 (aged 24)
7	Ryoya Ogawa	(Japan)	LB	24 November 1996 (aged 28)
22	Kimito Nono	(Japan)	RB	26 February 2002 (aged 22)
23	Keisuke Tsukui	(Japan)	CB	21 May 2004 (aged 20)
25	Ryuta Koike	(Japan)	RB	29 August 1995 (aged 29)
28	Shuhei Mizoguchi	(Japan)	LB	13 February 2004 (aged 21)
32	Haruto Matsumoto	(Japan)	RB	29 September 2006 (aged 18)
36	Mihiro Sato	(Japan)	LB	26 February 2007 (aged 17)
44	Yugo Okawa ^{Type 2}	(Japan)	DF	14 July 2007 (aged 17)
47	Anthony Udemba Motosuna ^{Type 2}	(Japan)	DF	10 March 2009 (aged 15)
55	Naomichi Ueda	(Japan)	CB	24 October 1994 (aged 30)
Midfielders
6	Kento Misao	(Japan)	DM	16 April 1996 (aged 28)
10	Gaku Shibasaki (c)	(Japan)	CM / DM	28 May 1992 (aged 32)
13	Kei Chinen	(Japan)	CM / FW	17 March 1995 (aged 29)
14	Yuta Higuchi	(Japan)	RM / CM	30 October 1996 (aged 28)
17	Talles	(Brazil)	LW / AM	12 May 1998 (aged 26)
20	Yu Funabashi	(Japan)	DM	12 July 2002 (aged 22)
27	Yūta Matsumura	(Japan)	RM / RW	13 April 2001 (aged 23)
33	Yoshiro Shimoda	(Japan)	DM	5 May 2004 (aged 20)
37	Haruki Hayashi ^{DSP}	(Japan)	MF	5 December 2003 (aged 21)
71	Ryōtarō Araki	(Japan)	AM	29 January 2002 (aged 23)
Forwards
9	Léo Ceará	(Brazil)	FW	3 February 1995 (aged 30)
11	Kyosuke Tagawa	(Japan)	FW / LW	11 February 1999 (aged 26)
18	Élber	(Brazil)	FW	27 May 1992 (aged 32)
19	Shu Morooka	(Japan)	FW / RW	9 December 2000 (aged 24)
34	Homare Tokuda	(Japan)	FW	18 February 2007 (aged 17)
40	Yuma Suzuki	(Japan)	FW	28 April 1996 (aged 28)
45	Minato Yoshida ^{Type 2}	(Japan)	FW	15 July 2008 (aged 16)
46	Hayate Cho ^{Type 2}	(Japan)	FW	17 August 2007 (aged 17)
77	Aleksandar Čavrić	(Serbia)	FW / RW	18 May 1994 (aged 30)

Last updated: 18 August 2025.
Source: Kashima Antlers website

== Transfers ==
=== Arrivals ===
Date	Position	Player	From	Type	Source
18 December 2024	DF	(Japan) Ryuta Koike	(Japan) Yokohama F. Marinos	Full	
27 December 2024	MF	(Japan) Yoshihiro Shimoda	(Japan) Iwaki FC	Loan return	
30 December 2024	MF	(Japan) Yūta Matsumura	(Japan) Tokyo Verdy	Loan return	
3 January 2025	FW	(Serbia) Aleksandar Čavrić	(Slovakia) Slovan Bratislava	Full	
4 January 2025	DF	(South Korea) Kim Tae-hyeon	(Japan) Sagan Tosu	Full	
5 January 2025	MF	(Japan) Ryōtarō Araki	(Japan) FC Tokyo	Loan return	
6 January 2025	FW	(Brazil) Léo Ceará	(Japan) Cerezo Osaka	Full	
9 May 2025	DF	(Japan) Haruki Hayashi	(Japan) Meiji University	DSP	
9 June 2025	DF	(Japan) Ryoya Ogawa	(Belgium) Sint-Truiden	Full	
9 June 2025	DF	(Japan) Kaito Chida	(Japan) Tokyo Verdy	Full	
12 August 2025	FW	(Brazil) Élber	(Japan) Yokohama F. Marinos	Full	

=== Departures ===
Date	Position	Player	To	Type	Source
13 December 2024	MF	(Brazil) Guilherme Parede	(Argentina) Talleres	Loan return	
18 December 2024	MF	(Japan) Shintaro Nago	(Japan) Avispa Fukuoka	Full	
24 December 2024	MF	(Japan) Tomoya Fujii	(Japan) Shonan Bellmare	Full	
24 December 2024	MF	(Japan) Hayato Nakama	(Japan) Kashiwa Reysol	Full	
25 December 2024	DF	(Japan) Naoki Hayashi	(Japan) Tokyo Verdy	Full	
25 December 2024	FW	(Japan) Itsuki Someno	(Japan) Tokyo Verdy	Full	
27 December 2024	DF	(Japan) Hidehiro Sugai	(Japan) Kyoto Sanga FC	Full	
27 December 2024	MF	(Japan) Ryotaro Nakamura	(Japan) Montedio Yamagata	Full	
3 January 2025	MF	(Japan) Naoki Sutoh	(Japan) Kochi United SC	Loan	
12 January 2025	MF	(Serbia) Radomir Milosavljević	(Serbia) FK Radnički Niš	Loan	
20 June 2025	MF	(Serbia) Radomir Milosavljević	(Serbia) FK Radnički Niš	Full	

== Competitions ==
=== J1 League ===
Despite losing starting centre back Ikuma Sekigawa, left back Koki Anzai, and attacker Shu Morooka to season-ending injuries, the club demonstrated resilience throughout the campaign.

The season featured inconsistent periods, including three consecutive losses between matchdays 8–10 and a four-match winless streak. However, Kashima remained undefeated following a loss to Kawasaki Frontale on matchday 23, maintaining this streak through the season's conclusion.

Kashima conceded only four goals in their final ten matches and allowed no more than one goal per game after a 3–2 victory over Kashiwa Reysol in July. The team secured wins in both fixtures against Reysol, which proved decisive as the clubs finished separated by just one point in the final standings.

Pos	Team	Pld	W	D	L	GF	GA	GD	Pts	Qualification or relegation
1	Kashima Antlers (C)	38	23	7	8	58	31	+27	76	Qualification for the AFC Champions League Elite league stage
2	Kashiwa Reysol	38	21	12	5	60	34	+26	75	Qualification for the AFC Champions League Elite league stage
3	Kyoto Sanga	38	19	11	8	62	40	+22	68	Qualification for the AFC Champions League Elite league stage
4	Sanfrecce Hiroshima	38	20	8	10	46	28	+18	68	
5	Vissel Kobe	38	18	10	10	46	33	+13	64	Qualification for the AFC Champions League Elite league stage (Note: Qualified as the finalists of the J1 100 Year Vision League.)

Source: JLeague.co, JLeague.jp, J.League Data Site
Rules for classification: 1) Points; 2) Goal difference; 3) Goals scored; 4) Head-to-head points; 5) Head-to-head goal difference; 6) Head-to-head goals scored; 7) Fewer disciplinary points.
(C) Champions

==== Results by matchday ====
Round	1	2	3	4	5	6	7	8	9	10	11	12	13	14	15	16	17	18	19	20	21	22	23	24	25	26	27	28	29	30	31	32	33	34	35	36	37	38
Ground	A	H	H	H	A	H	H	A	H	A	A	H	A	H	A	H	H	A	A	H	A	H	A	H	A	H	A	A	H	A	H	A	H	A	A	H	A	H
Result	L	W	W	W	W	D	W	L	L	L	W	W	W	W	W	W	W	L	W	D	L	L	L	W	W	D	W	D	W	W	W	W	D	D	D	W	W	W
Position	14	6	6	4	1	1	1	1	3	8	3	2	1	1	1	1	1	1	1	1	1	1	4	2	1	2	2	4	2	1	1	1	1	1	1	1	1	1

Source: J. League Data Site
A = Away; H = Home; W = Win; D = Draw; L = Loss

==== Results summary ====
Overall								Home						Away					
Pld	W	D	L	GF	GA	GD	Pts	W	D	L	GF	GA	GD	W	D	L	GF	GA	GD
38	23	7	8	58	31	+27	76	13	4	2	34	16	+18	10	3	6	24	15	+9

Source: Worldfootball

==== Matches ====
All match start times are in JST.

15 February 1	Shonan Bellmare	1–0	Kashima Antlers	Hiratsuka
15:03 JST	Fukuda 64'	Report		Stadium: Lemon Gas Stadium Hiratsuka; Attendance: 13,025; Referee: Masuya Ueda

22 February 2	Kashima Antlers	4–0	Tokyo Verdy	Kashima
15:03 JST	Léo Ceará 22', 25'; Suzuki 42', 75'	Report		Stadium: Kashima Soccer Stadium; Attendance: 26,021; Referee: Akihiko Ikeuchi

26 February 3	Kashima Antlers	2–1	Albirex Niigata	Kashima
19:03 JST	Koike 10'; Inamura 78' (o.g.)	Report	Yamura 44'	Stadium: Kashima Soccer Stadium; Attendance: 12,106; Referee: Ryo Tanimoto

1 March 4	Kashima Antlers	2–0	FC Tokyo	Kashima
14:03 JST	Suzuki 74'; Morooka 90+1'	Report		Stadium: Kashima Soccer Stadium; Attendance: 21,421; Referee: Yusuke Araki

8 March 5	Kashiwa Reysol	1–3	Kashima Antlers	Kashiwa
16:03 JST	Kubo 57'	Report	Léo Ceará 26', 50', 62'	Stadium: Sankyo Frontier Kashiwa Stadium; Attendance: 13,309; Referee: Takafumi Mikuriya

16 March 6	Kashima Antlers	1–1	Urawa Red Diamonds	Kashima
14:03 JST	Chinen 90'	Report	Matsumoto 45+4'	Stadium: Kashima Soccer Stadium; Attendance: 31,574; Referee: Futoshi Nakamura

29 March 7	Kashima Antlers	1–0	Vissel Kobe	Kashima
15:03 JST	Léo Ceará 33'	Report		Stadium: Kashima Soccer Stadium; Attendance: 22,601; Referee: Yudai Yamamoto

2 April 8	Sanfrecce Hiroshima	1–0	Kashima Antlers	Hiroshima
19:03 JST	Maeda 22'	Report		Stadium: Edion Peace Wing Hiroshima; Attendance: 24,868; Referee: Hiroki Kasahara

6 April 9	Kashima Antlers	3–4	Kyoto Sanga	Kashima
15:03 JST	Léo Ceará 18', 30'; Morooka 90+2'	Report	Okugawa 61'; Rafael Elias 80', 82', 90+5'	Stadium: Kashima Soccer Stadium; Attendance: 16,859; Referee: Masuya Ueda

12 April 10	Cerezo Osaka	1–0	Kashima Antlers	Osaka
15:05 JST	Shindo 90+12'	Report		Stadium: Yodoko Sakura Stadium; Attendance: 19,410; Referee: Akihiko Ikeuchi

20 April 11	Fagiano Okayama	1–2	Kashima Antlers	Okayama
14:03 JST	Sato 43'	Report	Čavrić 50'; Talles 73'	Stadium: JFE Harenokuni Stadium; Attendance: 15,325; Referee: Keigo Sendachi

25 April 12	Kashima Antlers	1–0	Nagoya Grampus	Kashima
19:03 JST	Chinen 54'	Report		Stadium: Kashima Soccer Stadium; Attendance: 13,550; Referee: Koichiro Fukushima

29 April 13	Yokohama FC	0–3	Kashima Antlers	Yokohama
14:03 JST		Report	Čavrić 49' (pen.); Suzuki 67'; Yamazaki 77' (o.g.)	Stadium: Mitsuzawa Stadium; Attendance: 13,252; Referee: Jumpei Iida

3 May 14	Kashima Antlers	1–0	Machida Zelvia	Kashima
15:03 JST	Tagawa 39'	Report		Stadium: Kashima Soccer Stadium; Attendance: 33,762; Referee: Takafumi Mikuriya

6 May 15	Avispa Fukuoka	0–1	Kashima Antlers	Fukuoka
14:03 JST		Report	Léo Ceará 43' (pen.)	Stadium: Best Denki Stadium; Attendance: 14,039; Referee: Masuya Ueda

11 May 16	Kashima Antlers	2–1	Kawasaki Frontale	Tokyo
13:10 JST	Funabashi 45+1'; Tagawa 65'	Report	Sasaki 7'	Stadium: Japan National Stadium; Attendance: 59,574; Referee: Futoshi Nakamura

17 May 17	Kashima Antlers	1–0	Shimizu S-Pulse	Kashima
15:04 JST	Suzuki 7'	Report		Stadium: Kashima Soccer Stadium; Attendance: 20,864; Referee: Florian Badstübner

25 May 18	Yokohama F. Marinos	3–1	Kashima Antlers	Yokohama
14:03 JST	Nagato 4'; Yan Matheus 13', 27'	Report	Léo Ceará 36'	Stadium: Nissan Stadium; Attendance: 32,443; Referee: Koichiro Fukushima

31 May 19	Gamba Osaka	0–1	Kashima Antlers	Osaka
18:03 JST		Report	Léo Ceará 9'	Stadium: Panasonic Stadium Suita; Attendance: 32,013; Referee: Takafumi Mikuriya

14 June 20	Kashima Antlers	1–1	Sanfrecce Hiroshima	Kashima
18:03 JST	Léo Ceará 90+2'	Report	Higashi 19'	Stadium: Kashima Soccer Stadium; Attendance: 22,725; Referee: Ryo Tanimoto

21 June 21	Machida Zelvia	2–1	Kashima Antlers	Machida
16:03 JST	Soma 6'; Okamura 34'	Report	Suzuki 85' (pen.)	Stadium: Machida GION Stadium; Attendance: 13,828; Referee: Yudai Yamamoto

29 June 22	Kashima Antlers	1–2	Fagiano Okayama	Kashima
18:03 JST	Suzuki 18'	Report	Esaka 50'; Kamiya 59'	Stadium: Kashima Soccer Stadium; Attendance: 22,254; Referee: Koki Nagamine

5 July 23	Kawasaki Frontale	2–1	Kashima Antlers	Kawasaki
19:03 JST	Ito 45+4'; Marcinho 58'	Report	Léo Ceará 25'	Stadium: Uvance Todoroki Stadium by Fujitsu; Attendance: 23,675; Referee: Yusuke Araki

20 July 24	Kashima Antlers	3–2	Kashiwa Reysol	Kashima
18:03 JST	Léo Ceará 5'; Ueda 39'; Matsumura 90+4'	Report	Koyamatsu 43'; Segawa 76'	Stadium: Kashima Soccer Stadium; Attendance: 33,400; Referee: Hiroyuki Kimura

10 August 25	FC Tokyo	0–1	Kashima Antlers	Tokyo
19:03 JST		Report	Tagawa 81'	Stadium: Ajinomoto Stadium; Attendance: 40,939; Referee: Jumpei Iida

16 August 26	Kashima Antlers	1–1	Avispa Fukuoka	Kashima
18:03 JST	Funabashi 84'	Report	Usui 50'	Stadium: Kashima Soccer Stadium; Attendance: 30,672; Referee: Iván Barton

23 August 27	Albirex Niigata	1–2	Kashima Antlers	Niigata
19:03 JST	Matheus Moraes 17'	Report	Suzuki 4'; Léo Ceará 87'	Stadium: Denka Big Swan Stadium; Attendance: 26,100; Referee: Hiroki Kasahara

31 August 28	Shimizu S-Pulse	1–1	Kashima Antlers	Shizuoka
18:33 JST	Takahashi 20'	Report	Ueda 74'	Stadium: IAI Stadium Nihondaira; Attendance: 17,936; Referee: Yoshiro Imamura

13 September 29	Kashima Antlers	3–0	Shonan Bellmare	Kashima
19:03 JST	Čavrić 48'; Nono 55'; Léo Ceará 68'	Report		Stadium: Kashima Soccer Stadium; Attendance: 23,121; Referee: Akihiko Ikeuchi

20 September 30	Urawa Red Diamonds	0–1	Kashima Antlers	Saitama
19:04 JST		Report	Suzuki 14'	Stadium: Saitama Stadium 2002; Attendance: 53,301; Referee: Koichiro Fukushima

23 September 31	Kashima Antlers	3–1	Cerezo Osaka	Kashima
18:03 JST	Chinen 31'; Léo Ceará 53'; Matsumura 68'	Report	Vitor Bueno 28' (pen.)	Stadium: Kashima Soccer Stadium; Attendance: 25,752; Referee: Faisal Suleiman Al-Balawi

27 September 32	Nagoya Grampus	0–4	Kashima Antlers	Toyota
17:03 JST		Report	Élber 10'; Léo Ceará 19'; Tokuda 88', 90'	Stadium: Toyota Stadium; Attendance: 34,648; Referee: Futoshi Nakamura

5 October 33	Kashima Antlers	0–0	Gamba Osaka	Kashima
15:03 JST		Report		Stadium: Kashima Soccer Stadium; Attendance: 32,407; Referee: Yudai Yamamoto

17 October 34	Vissel Kobe	0–0	Kashima Antlers	Kobe
19:03 JST		Report		Stadium: Noevir Stadium Kobe; Attendance: 25,806; Referee: Takafumi Mikuriya

25 October 35	Kyoto Sanga	1–1	Kashima Antlers	Kameoka
14:03 JST	Marco Túlio 36'	Report	Suzuki 90+6'	Stadium: Sanga Stadium by Kyocera; Attendance: 20,353; Referee: Hiroyuki Kimura

8 November 36	Kashima Antlers	2–1	Yokohama FC	Kashima
14:03 JST	Léo Ceará 62'; Chinen 65'	Report	Nduka 67'	Stadium: Kashima Soccer Stadium; Attendance: 34,873; Referee: Koichiro Fukushima

30 November 37	Tokyo Verdy	0–1	Kashima Antlers	Tokyo
14:05 JST		Report	Matsumura 74'	Stadium: Ajinomoto Stadium; Attendance: 38,168; Referee: Takafumi Mikuriya

6 December 38	Kashima Antlers	2–1	Yokohama F.Marinos	Kashima
14:03 JST	Léo Ceará 20', 57'	Report	Amano 90+1'	Stadium: Kashima Soccer Stadium; Attendance: 37,079; Referee: Hiroyuki Kimura

=== J.League Cup ===
20 March First round – Match 1	Tochigi City	0–1	Kashima Antlers	Tochigi
14:00		Report	Nono 69'	Stadium: City Football Station; Attendance: 4,532; Referee: Koei Koya

9 April First round – Match 2	Renofa Yamaguchi	1–1 (a.e.t.) (5–3 p)	Kashima Antlers	Yamaguchi
19:00	Ozawa 64'	Report	Morooka 81'	Stadium: Ishin Me-Life Stadium; Attendance: 4,689; Referee: Takuto Okabe
	Penalties
	Furukawa (penalty scored); Yamamoto (penalty scored); Naruoka (penalty scored); Noyori (penalty scored); Tanabe (penalty scored)		(penalty scored) Léo Ceará; (penalty missed) Shibasaki; (penalty scored) Ueda; (penalty scored) Koike

=== Emperor's Cup ===
11 June Second round	Kashima Antlers	4–0	Thespa Gunma	Kashima
19:00	Sehata 36' (o.g.); Suzuki 50', 55', 86'	Report		Stadium: Kashima Soccer Stadium; Attendance: 6,108; Referee: Hiroyuki Kimura

16 July Third round	Kashima Antlers	2–1	V-Varen Nagasaki	Nagasaki
19:00	Čavrić 9'; Ogawa 53'	Report	Yamasaki 58'	Stadium: Peace Stadium Connected by SoftBank; Attendance: 11,388; Referee: Koei Koya

6 August Fourth round	Kashima Antlers	3–2 (a.e.t.)	Avispa Fukuoka	Kashima
19:00	Čavrić 13' (pen.); Chinen 52'; Suzuki 116'	Report	Maejima 45+2'; Zahedi 90+3'	Stadium: Mercari Stadium; Attendance: 8,241; Referee: Koji Takasaki

27 August Quarter-finals	Machida Zelvia	3–0	Kashima Antlers	Machida
18:30	Masuyama 15'; Fujio 21'; Shimoda 46'	Report		Stadium: Machida GION Stadium; Attendance: 5,965; Referee: Yusuke Araki

== Statistics ==
=== Goalscorers ===
The list is sorted by shirt number when total goals are equal.

Rnk	Pos	No.	Player	J1	EC	JLC	Total
1	FW	9	(Brazil) Léo Ceará	21	0	0	21
2	FW	40	(Japan) Yuma Suzuki	10	4	0	14
3	FW	77	(Serbia) Aleksandar Čavrić	3	2	0	5
3	MF	13	(Japan) Kei Chinen	4	1	0	5
5	FW	11	(Japan) Kyosuke Tagawa	3	0	0	3
5	FW	19	(Japan) Shu Morooka	2	0	1	3
5	MF	27	(Japan) Yūta Matsumura	3	0	0	3
5	–	–	Own goal	2	1	0	3
9	MF	20	(Japan) Yu Funabashi	2	0	0	2
9	DF	22	(Japan) Kimito Nono	1	0	1	2
9	FW	34	(Japan) Homare Tokuda	2	0	0	2
9	DF	55	(Japan) Naomichi Ueda	2	0	0	2
13	DF	7	(Japan) Ryoya Ogawa	0	1	0	1
13	MF	17	(Brazil) Talles	1	0	0	1
13	FW	18	(Brazil) Élber	1	0	0	1
13	DF	25	(Japan) Ryuta Koike	1	0	0	1
TOTAL				58	9	2	69

Source: jleague.co

=== Clean sheets ===
The list is sorted by shirt number when total clean sheets are equal.

Rnk	No.	Player	J1	EC	JLC	Total
1	1	(Japan) Tomoki Hayakawa	16	0	1	17
TOTALS			16	0	1	17

Source: fbref.com
