= Koki Anzai =

Japanese footballer

Kōki Anzai 安西幸輝
Personal information
- Full name: Koki Anzai
- Date of birth: May 31, 1995 (age 31)
- Place of birth: Hyōgo, Japan
- Height: 1.72 m (5 ft 8 in)
- Position: Full-back

Team information
- Current team: Kashima Antlers
- Number: 2

Youth career
- 2002–2004: Tozuka FC
- 2005–2013: Tokyo Verdy

Senior career*
Years	Team	Apps	(Gls)
2014–2017	Tokyo Verdy	150	(6)
2018–2019	Kashima Antlers	43	(6)
2019–2021	Portimonense	54	(1)
2021–	Kashima Antlers	148	(2)

International career^{‡}
2019–	Japan	5	(0)
- * Club domestic league appearances and goals as of 9 August 2026 ‡ National team caps and goals as of 9 October 2020

Koki Anzai (安西幸輝, Anzai Kōki; born May 31, 1995) is a Japanese footballer who plays as a full-back for J1 League club Kashima Antlers and has represented the Japan national team.

Born in Hyōgo, Anzai came through the ranks at Tokyo Verdy and played 150 games for them before moving to J1 League club Kashima Antlers in 2018. After 18 months at Kashima, he moved to Portuguese side Portimonense and in 2019 made his debut for the national team. After two seasons in Europe, Anzai moved back to Japan and Kashima in the 2021 season.

== Youth career ==
Born in Hyōgo, Anzai started playing football from an early age – beginning as a midfield player in elementary and junior high school, but converting to a full-back in his first year of high school. Whilst at Tozuka-higashi Elementary School, he played youth football firstly for Tozuka FC Juniors in Kawaguchi, Saitama and then moved through the youth ranks of Tokyo Verdy whilst at Meguro Nihon University High School. Despite being small in stature, Anzai was given confidence by Verdy's youth coach Satoshi Tsunami that he would become a professional player and encouraged him to continue in their youth ranks rather than play high school football. Anzai made 48 appearances for Tokyo Verdy's youth teams from 2011 to 2013 in both the Prince Takamado Trophy and the Japan Club Youth Cup – making his U18 debut at just 15 years old.

== Club career ==
=== Tokyo Verdy ===
In 2014, aged 19, Anzai was promoted to Tokyo Verdy's first team squad, taking the number 34 shirt. He made his debut in a 3–1 J2 League defeat to Matsumoto Yamaga in the first league game of the 2014 season, where he played the full 90 minutes. In May 2014, Anzai scored his first professional goal in a 1–0 league victory over Kamatamare Sanuki. Anzai made more appearances than any of his teammates in his debut season, playing all but one league game including 34 starts and playing over 3000 minutes of football. Verdy however did not have a successful season and finished in 20th out of 22 teams, narrowly avoiding the relegation playoff game.

For the 2015 season, Anzai was given the number 2 shirt at Tokyo Verdy, highlighting his prominence in the first-team squad. In pre-season, Anzai visited English Premier League club West Ham as part of a week long training camp, where he met the likes of Andy Carroll, Alex Song and Mark Noble. Playing alongside such players, Anzai said that he felt the biggest difference was the physicality of the game in England and started more strength training on his return to Japan. He went on to make 35 league appearances in the 2015 season, helping Verdy to a much improved 8th-placed finish in the J2 League. Tokyo Verdy continued to be inconsistent performers in the league, finishing the 2016 season in 18th place and the 2017 in the play-off places, where they were beaten at the semi-final stage by Avispa Fukuoka. Anzai continued to impress and was ever-present throughout, and by the end of the 2017 season was playing under his third manager at Verdy, following the dismissals of Yasutoshi Miura and Koichi Togashi. Manager Miguel Ángel Lotina also started to push Anzai further up the pitch and started to be used increasingly as a right midfielder from the middle of the season. By the end of the 2017 season, Anzai had made 153 appearances for Verdy, scoring 6 goals.

=== Kashima Antlers ===
After 12 years at Tokyo Verdy, in December 2017 it was announced that Anzai would be joining J1 League club Kashima Antlers, wearing the number 32 shirt. Although disappointed not to help promote his boyhood team Verdy to the top division, he would get a chance to play alongside Atsuto Uchida, a right-back and fellow countryman that he had long admired. He made his debut for Kashima in an AFC Champions League 1–1 draw with Chinese Super League club Shanghai Shenhua. This was also his first appearance in an international competition. He made his J1 League debut in the same month in a 0–0 draw with Shimizu S-Pulse. Anzai quickly became a regular starter, however he was primarily played as a left-back rather than his usual right-back position, taking the position from Shuto Yamamoto. He scored his first goal for Kashima in July, in a 6–2 league victory over Kashiwa Reysol. Receiving the ball in his own half, he dribbled through the Kashiwa defence at full pace and produced a fine finish past the goalkeeper. Such was the quality of the goal, that it won July's Goal of the Month competition. Anzai played a total of 28 league games and scored three goals in his first season, in spite of a knee injury suffered in March that kept him sidelined for a month. In November 2018, Kashima won their first ever AFC Champions League title after a 2–0 aggregate victory over Iranian club Persepolis, with Anzai coming on as a substitute in both of the finals games. This was his first piece of silverware as a professional player. Anzai played in most of the Champions League games, making 10 appearances in total, but was increasingly used as a wide midfielder rather than a full-back, including in the finals. As reward for Kashima winning the Champions League, Anzai went on to represent them at the Club World Cup, making three appearances in the competition including coming on as substitute in their 3–1 defeat to Real Madrid in the semi-finals. Anzai made a total of 50 appearances in the 2018 season across five competitions, but ended the season battling for a place in starting line-up, with Shuto Yamamoto, Daigo Nishi and Atsuto Uchida all seemingly preferred in the full-back positions.

For the 2019 season, Anzai was given the 22 shirt after Daigo Nishi transferred to Vissel Kobe. It didn't take long before Anzai had become the team's first-choice left-back in place of Shuto Yamamoto and his form had caught the eye of national team coach Hajime Moriyasu, who called up Anzai to represent Japan in series of games in March. After the international games, Anzai's good form continued and after 15 league appearances Anzai had scored three goals and made three assists.

=== Portimonense ===
Mid-way through the Japanese league season in July 2019, it was announced that Anzai would be transferring to Portuguese Primeira Liga side Portimonense, joining compatriot Shūichi Gonda in their squad. Anzai had made no secret of his desire to one day play abroad and at 24 years old he felt that it was now or never to play in Europe and also an opportunity to cement his place in the national team squad. Anzai took the number 22 shirt, mirroring his role model Atsuto Uchida who used the number when he transferred to Schalke 04 in 2010. Anzai made his debut for Portimonense in August 2019 in a 2–0 Taça da Liga win against Academica. He played the full 90 minutes and provided an assist for the second goal by Aylton Boa Morte. He also didn't have to wait too long to score his first goal for the club, scoring in a closely contested 3–2 defeat to FC Porto in September. Anzai was a regular starter in the first half of the season, however Portimonense were not performing well in the league and after a 3–0 defeat to last-placed team C.D. Aves in January, manager António Folha was dismissed. Once the league season had restarted after the break between March and June due to the COVID-19 pandemic, Anzai was used more as a substitute as Emmanuel Hackman appeared to be the new manager's first choice right-back. After winning only 7 games in the season, Portimonense finished in 17th place and were due to be relegated, but due to a technicality the LPFP relegated Vitória de Setubal in their place, so Anzai would continue to play top-flight football. For the 2020–21 season, Anzai staked his claim as the first-choice right-back, playing in 31 of the 34 league games throughout the season. He was unable to contribute as much as he would have liked offensively, only registering one assist and scoring no goals throughout the season. Nevertheless, Portimonense again struggled in the league and finished in 14th place, only 4 points clear of relegation.

=== Return to Kashima Antlers ===
Anzai was contacted by Kashima's Director of Football Mitsuru Suzuki asking if he wanted to return to the club. Ideally, he wanted to keep playing in Europe but also wanted to give himself the best chance of retaining his place in the national team setup. After two years in Portugal, in July 2021 it was announced that Anzai would be rejoining Kashima Antlers, finally claiming the prestigious number 2 shirt. He joined at the end of the Portuguese season, but it was mid-way through the 2021 J1 League season. Anzai made his first appearance after re-joining on gameweek 23 in a substitute appearance against Shonan Bellmare. After a few substitute appearances, it wasn't long before Anzai made his first league start in gameweek 26 – a 4–0 win over Shimizu S-Pulse. After this point, he was back to being a permanent fixture in the starting XI, largely replacing Katsuya Nagato in the left-back position. He went on to make 20 appearances across all competitions in his half season with Kashima.

In the 2022 season, Anzai cemented his place in the team and played 45 games throughout the year, starting in almost every league game.

At the end of the 2024 season, Anzai won the Fair Play Individual Award for his performances throughout the season, helping Kashima finish in 5th place in the league.

== International career ==
After a solid start to the 2019 season for Kashima Antlers, Anzai was called up to represent the Japan national team by manager Hajime Moriyasu, in the absence of regular full-backs Yuto Nagatomo and Hiroki Sakai. He made his debut on 22 March 2019 in a friendly as part of the Kirin Cup against Colombia, as an 89th-minute substitute for Sho Sasaki. Days later on 26 March, Anzai made his first start for Japan in a 1–0 friendly win against Bolivia, playing 73 minutes before being substituted. Anzai said that he perhaps didn't play to his best in the game against Bolivia, but the experience of training for 10 days with the national team and a taste of international football was exciting and would provide room for growth. Anzai was then left out of the squad that competed in the 2019 Copa América in June 2019, with Daiki Sugioka and Tomoki Iwata taking the starting full-back positions. He was however recalled for the following game – a continuation of the Kirin Cup and a 2–0 win over Paraguay. Anzai came on as a 67th-minute substitute for Yuto Nagatomo.

In October 2019, Anzai made his first competitive international appearance, coming on as a second-half substitute for Hiroki Sakai in a 6–0 win over Mongolia in a 2022 World Cup Qualifying game. Unfortunately, he was then not picked for any of the remaining qualifiers at the end of 2019, nor the EAFF E-1 Football Championship. His next cap came in a 0–0 friendly draw with Cameroon in October 2020, although his inclusion was in part due to the fact that only European based players were picked for the squad due to the COVID-19 pandemic as the match took place in the Utrecht, Netherlands. He started the game but was substituted at half time – this was his last appearance for Japan to date.

== Play style ==
Anzai is small in stature, but is known as a player that possesses a lot of speed and stamina, with a good dribbling ability. A right-footed player, he can play in either the right-back or left-back position, but his attacking instincts often mean he plays more like a wing-back.

== Career statistics ==
=== Club ===
As of end of 2025 season

Appearances and goals by club, season and competition
Club	Season	League			National Cup (Note: Includes the Emperor's Cup and Taça de Portugal)		League Cup (Note: Includes the J.League Cup and Taça da Liga)		Continental		Other		Total	
Club	Season	Division	Apps	Goals	Apps	Goals	Apps	Goals	Apps	Goals	Apps	Goals	Apps	Goals
Tokyo Verdy	2014	J2 League	41	2	1	0	—		—		—		42	2
Tokyo Verdy	2015	J2 League	35	1	0	0	—		—		—		35	1
Tokyo Verdy	2016	J2 League	34	0	1	0	—		—		—		35	0
Tokyo Verdy	2017	J2 League	40	3	0	0	—		—		1 (Note: Appearance in J1 League Promotion Playoffs)	0	41	3
Tokyo Verdy	Total		150	6	2	0	—		—		1	0	153	6
Kashima Antlers	2018	J1 League	28	3	5	0	4	0	10 (Note: Appearances in AFC Champions League)	0	3 (Note: Appearances in FIFA Club World Cup)	0	50	3
Kashima Antlers	2019	J1 League	15	3	0	0	0	0	7	0	—		22	3
Kashima Antlers	Total		43	6	5	0	4	0	17	0	3	0	72	6
Portimonense	2019–20	Primeira Liga	23	1	1	0	4	0	—		—		28	1
Portimonense	2020–21	Primeira Liga	31	0	1	0	0	0	—		—		32	0
Portimonense	Total		54	1	2	0	4	0	—		—		60	1
Kashima Antlers	2021	J1 League	16	0	2	0	2	0	—		—		20	0
Kashima Antlers	2022	J1 League	33	0	4	0	8	0	—		—		45	0
Kashima Antlers	2023	J1 League	31	0	1	0	7	0	—		—		39	0
Kashima Antlers	2024	J1 League	38	1	3	0	2	1	—		—		43	2
Kashima Antlers	2025	J1 League	19	0	0	0	2	0	—		—		21	0
Kashima Antlers	Total		137	1	10	0	21	1	—		—		168	2
Career Total			384	14	19	0	29	1	17	0	4	0	453	15

=== International ===
As of match played 9 October 2020

Japan national team
Year	Apps	Goals
2019	4	0
2020	1	0
Total	5	0

== Honours ==
=== Club ===
Kashima Antlers

- AFC Champions League: 2018
- J1 League: 2025

=== Individual ===
- J1 League Goal of the Month: July 2018
