= 2018 Kashima Antlers season =

Kashima Antlers
2018 season
- Manager: Go Oiwa
- Stadium: Kashima Soccer Stadium
- J1 League: 3rd
- Emperor's Cup: Semi-finals
- League Cup: Semi-finals
- Champions League: Winners
- FIFA Club World Cup: Fourth place
- Top goalscorer: League: Yuma Suzuki (11); All: Yuma Suzuki (17)
Home colours	Away colours

The 2018 season was Kashima Antlers's 26th consecutive season in the J1 League since professional football was established in Japan in 1993. In addition to the domestic league, the club also competed in the Emperor's Cup, J.League Cup, and AFC Champions League. They won the latter trophy securing their first ever Champions League trophy in their first appearance in the final.

== Squad ==
The Kashima Antlers squad for the 2018 season.

As of 10 January 2018.

Note: Flags indicate national team as defined under FIFA eligibility rules; some limited exceptions apply. Players may hold more than one non-FIFA nationality.

No.	Pos.	Nation	Player
1	GK	KOR	Kwoun Sun-tae
2	DF	JPN	Atsuto Uchida
3	DF	JPN	Gen Shoji
4	MF	BRA	Léo Silva
5	DF	JPN	Naomichi Ueda
6	MF	JPN	Ryota Nagaki
7	FW	BRA	Pedro Junior
8	MF	JPN	Shoma Doi
9	FW	JPN	Yuma Suzuki
10	FW	JPN	Mu Kanazaki
11	MF	BRA	Leandro Moura
13	MF	JPN	Atsutaka Nakamura
14	FW	JPN	Takeshi Kanamori
15	DF	JPN	Yuto Misao
16	DF	JPN	Shuto Yamamoto
19	FW	JPN	Kazuma Yamaguchi

No.	Pos.	Nation	Player
20	MF	JPN	Kento Misao
21	GK	JPN	Hitoshi Sogahata
22	DF	JPN	Daigo Nishi
23	DF	JPN	Itsuki Oda
24	DF	JPN	Yukitoshi Ito
25	MF	JPN	Yasushi Endo
26	MF	JPN	Kazune Kubota
28	DF	JPN	Koki Machida
29	GK	JPN	Shinichiro Kawamata
30	FW	JPN	Hiroki Abe
31	GK	JPN	Yuya Oki
32	DF	JPN	Koki Anzai
36	MF	JPN	Toshiya Tanaka
39	DF	JPN	Tomoya Inukai
40	MF	JPN	Mitsuo Ogasawara (captain)

=== Out on loan ===
Note: Flags indicate national team as defined under FIFA eligibility rules; some limited exceptions apply. Players may hold more than one non-FIFA nationality.

No.	Pos.	Nation	Player
17	DF	BRA	Bueno (at Tokushima Vortis)
—	MF	JPN	Taiki Hirato (at Machida Zelvia)
—	MF	JPN	Taro Sugimoto (at Tokushima Vortis)
—	FW	JPN	Yuki Kakita (at Zweigen Kanazawa)

== Competitions ==
=== J1 League ===
==== League table ====
Pos	Team	Pld	W	D	L	GF	GA	GD	Pts	Qualification or relegation
1	Kawasaki Frontale (C)	34	21	6	7	57	27	+30	69	Qualification for the Champions League group stage
2	Sanfrecce Hiroshima	34	17	6	11	47	35	+12	57	Qualification for the Champions League play-off round
3	Kashima Antlers	34	16	8	10	50	39	+11	56	Qualification for the Champions League play-off round
4	Hokkaido Consadole Sapporo	34	15	10	9	48	48	0	55	
5	Urawa Red Diamonds	34	14	9	11	51	39	+12	51	Qualification for the Champions League group stage (Note: Urawa Red Diamonds qualified for the 2019 AFC Champions League group stage as 2018 Emperor's Cup winners.)

Source: Meiji Yasuda J1 League
Rules for classification: 1) Points; 2) Goal difference; 3) Goals scored
(C) Champions

==== Matches ====
Match	Date	Team	Score	Team	Venue	Attendance
1	2018.02.25	Shimizu S-Pulse	0–0	Kashima Antlers	IAI Stadium Nihondaira	19,632
2	2018.03.03	Kashima Antlers	1–0	Gamba Osaka	Kashima Soccer Stadium	24,545
3	2018.03.10	Kashima Antlers	0–1	Sanfrecce Hiroshima	Kashima Soccer Stadium	16,799
4	2018.03.18	Sagan Tosu	0–1	Kashima Antlers	Best Amenity Stadium	17,757
5	2018.03.31	Kashima Antlers	0–0	Hokkaido Consadole Sapporo	Kashima Soccer Stadium	19,629
6	2018.04.07	Shonan Bellmare	2–1	Kashima Antlers	Shonan BMW Stadium Hiratsuka	13,947
7	2018.04.11	FC Tokyo	2–1	Kashima Antlers	Ajinomoto Stadium	17,260
8	2018.04.14	Kashima Antlers	2–0	Nagoya Grampus	Kashima Soccer Stadium	17,921
9	2018.04.21	Kawasaki Frontale	4–1	Kashima Antlers	Kawasaki Todoroki Stadium	24,358
10	2018.04.25	Kashima Antlers	1–1	Vissel Kobe	Kashima Soccer Stadium	7,672
11	2018.04.28	Yokohama F. Marinos	3–0	Kashima Antlers	Nissan Stadium	27,348
12	2018.05.02	Kashima Antlers	2–1	V-Varen Nagasaki	Kashima Soccer Stadium	11,848
13	2018.05.05	Kashima Antlers	1–0	Urawa Reds	Kashima Soccer Stadium	33,647
15	2018.05.20	Kashima Antlers	1–2	Vegalta Sendai	Kashima Soccer Stadium	23,942
16	2018.07.18	Júbilo Iwata	3–3	Kashima Antlers	Yamaha Stadium	13,577
17	2018.07.22	Kashima Antlers	6–2	Kashiwa Reysol	Kashima Soccer Stadium	24,480
14	2018.07.25	Cerezo Osaka	0–2	Kashima Antlers	Yanmar Stadium Nagai	16,631
18	2018.07.28	Gamba Osaka	1–1	Kashima Antlers	Panasonic Stadium Suita	28,534
19	2018.08.01	Kashima Antlers	1–2	FC Tokyo	Kashima Soccer Stadium	12,643
20	2018.08.05	Kashima Antlers	1–0	Shimizu S-Pulse	Kashima Soccer Stadium	19,119
21	2018.08.11	Nagoya Grampus	4–2	Kashima Antlers	Toyota Stadium	43,579
22	2018.08.15	V-Varen Nagasaki	1–2	Kashima Antlers	Transcosmos Stadium Nagasaki	12,328
23	2018.08.19	Kashima Antlers	1–0	Yokohama F. Marinos	Kashima Soccer Stadium	21,178
24	2018.08.24	Kashima Antlers	1–1	Júbilo Iwata	Kashima Soccer Stadium	13,575
25	2018.09.01	Sanfrecce Hiroshima	3–1	Kashima Antlers	Edion Stadium Hiroshima	13,107
26	2018.09.14	Kashima Antlers	2–1	Shonan Bellmare	Kashima Soccer Stadium	10,728
27	2018.09.23	Hokkaido Consadole Sapporo	0–2	Kashima Antlers	Sapporo Dome	21,074
28	2018.09.29	Vissel Kobe	0–5	Kashima Antlers	Noevir Stadium Kobe	23,774
29	2018.10.07	Kashima Antlers	0–0	Kawasaki Frontale	Kashima Soccer Stadium	31,798
30	2018.10.20	Urawa Reds	3–1	Kashima Antlers	Saitama Stadium 2002	46,893
31	2018.10.31	Kashima Antlers	1–0	Cerezo Osaka	Kashima Soccer Stadium	9,233
32	2018.11.06	Kashiwa Reysol	2–3	Kashima Antlers	Sankyo Frontier Kashiwa Stadium	9,255
33	2018.11.24	Vegalta Sendai	0–3	Kashima Antlers	Yurtec Stadium Sendai	19,152
34	2018.12.01	Kashima Antlers	0–0	Sagan Tosu	Kashima Soccer Stadium	31,619

=== Emperor's Cup ===
==== Second round ====
6 June 2018	Kashima Antlers	6–1	Honda FC	Kashima Soccer Stadium, Kashima
19:00		Report		Attendance: 3,172; Referee: Yudai Yamamoto

==== Third round ====
11 July 2018	Kashima Antlers	5–1	Machida Zelvia	Machida Stadium, Machida
18:30		Report		Attendance: 5,589

==== Fourth round ====
26 September 2018	Kashima Antlers	2–0 (a.e.t.)	Sanfrecce Hiroshima	Kashima Soccer Stadium, Kashima
19:00	Silva 96'; Misao 117'	Report		Attendance: 3,832; Referee: Toru Kakinuma

==== Quarter-final ====
21 November 2018	Kashima Antlers	1–0	Ventforet Kofu	Yamanashi Chuo Bank Stadium, Kōfu
19:03	Doi 76'	Report		Attendance: 6,243; Referee: Yuichi Nishimura

==== Semi-final ====
5 December 2018	Urawa Red Diamonds	1–0	Kashima Antlers	Kashima Soccer Stadium, Kashima
19:04	Maurício 27'	Report		Attendance: 13,949; Referee: Koichiro Fukushima

=== J.League Cup ===
==== Quarter-final ====
5 September 2018	Kashima Antlers	1–1	Kawasaki Frontale	Kashima Soccer Stadium, Kashima
19:04	Nishi 19'		32' (pen.) Chinen	Attendance: 7,145; Referee: M. Īda

9 September 2018	Kawasaki Frontale	1–3	Kashima Antlers	Ajinomoto Stadium, Chōfu
19:03	Abe 51' (pen.)		28', 37' Yamamoto; 72' Serginho	Attendance: 19,214; Referee: M. Yamamoto

Kashima Antlers won 4–2 on aggregate.

==== Semi-final ====
10 October 2018	Kashima Antlers	1–2	Yokohama F. Marinos	Kashima Soccer Stadium, Kashima
19:03	Inukai 90+4'	Report	Amano 77'; Vieira 90+5'	Attendance: 8,421; Referee: M. Matsuo

14 October 2018	Yokohama F. Marinos	2–2	Kashima Antlers	Nissan Stadium, Yokohama
14:04	Vieira 20'; Nakagawa 34'	Report	Doi 62'; Serginho 70'	Attendance: 12,979; Referee: M. Satō

Yokohama F. Marinos won 4–3 on aggregate.

=== AFC Champions League ===
==== Group stage ====
Pos	Team	Pld	W	D	L	GF	GA	GD	Pts	Qualification
1	(South Korea) Suwon Samsung Bluewings	6	3	1	2	8	7	+1	10	Round of 16
2	Kashima Antlers	6	2	3	1	8	6	+2	9	Round of 16
3	(Australia) Sydney FC	6	1	3	2	7	8	−1	6	
4	(China) Shanghai Shenhua	6	0	5	1	6	8	−2	5	

Source: AFC
Rules for classification: Group stage tiebreakers

14 February 2018	Kashima Antlers	1–1	(China) Shanghai Shenhua	Kashima Soccer Stadium, Kashima
19:00 UTC+9	Endo 51'	Live Report; Stats Report	Moreno 3'	Attendance: 9,192; Referee: Muhammad Taqi (Singapore)

21 February 2018	Suwon Samsung Bluewings (South Korea)	1–2	Kashima Antlers	Suwon World Cup Stadium, Suwon
19:00 UTC+9	Cristovam 89'	Live Report; Stats Report	Kanazaki 8', 59'	Attendance: 4,870; Referee: Abdulrahman Al-Jassim (Qatar)

7 March 2018	Sydney FC (Australia)	0–2	Kashima Antlers	Sydney Football Stadium, Sydney
19:30 UTC+11		Live Report; Stats Report	Doi 40'; Ueda 87'	Attendance: 6,442; Referee: Ahmed Al-Kaf (Oman)

13 March 2018	Kashima Antlers	1–1	(Australia) Sydney FC	Kashima Soccer Stadium, Kashima
19:00 UTC+9	Kanazaki 27'	Live Report; Stats Report	Simon 70'	Attendance: 8,636; Referee: Khamis Al-Marri (Qatar)

3 April 2018	Shanghai Shenhua (China)	2–2	Kashima Antlers	Hongkou Football Stadium, Shanghai
20:00 UTC+8	Moreno 13' (pen.); Mao Jianqing 28'	Live Report; Stats Report	Suzuki 58'; Leandro 63'	Attendance: 20,028; Referee: Mohd Amirul Izwan Yaacob (Malaysia)

17 April 2018	Kashima Antlers	0–1	(South Korea) Suwon Samsung Bluewings	Kashima Soccer Stadium, Kashima
19:00 UTC+9		Live Report; Stats Report	Damjanović 31'	Attendance: 6,229; Referee: Ammar Al-Jeneibi (United Arab Emirates)

==== Round of 16 ====
9 May 2018	Kashima Antlers	3–1	(China) Shanghai SIPG	Kashima Soccer Stadium, Kashima
19:00 UTC+9	Suzuki 43'; Nishi 49'; Yu Hai 75' (o.g.)	Live Report; Stats Report	Elkeson 77'	Attendance: 8,860; Referee: Ilgiz Tantashev (Uzbekistan)

16 May 2018	Shanghai SIPG (China)	2–1	Kashima Antlers	Shanghai Stadium, Shanghai
20:00 UTC+8	Hulk 7', 81' (pen.)	Live Report; Stats Report	Doi 42'	Attendance: 19,697; Referee: Mohammed Abdulla (United Arab Emirates)

Kashima Antlers won 4–3 on aggregate.

==== Quarter-final ====
28 August 2018	Kashima Antlers	2–0	(China) Tianjin Quanjian	Kashima Soccer Stadium, Kashima
19:00 UTC+9	Léo Silva 60'; Serginho 72'	Live Report; Stats Report		Attendance: 13,634; Referee: Adham Makhadmeh (Jordan)

18 September 2018	Tianjin Quanjian (China)	0–3	Kashima Antlers	Estádio Campo Desportivo, Macau (Note: The Tianjin Quanjian v Kashima Antlers match was played in Estádio Campo Desportivo, Macau instead of Tianjin Olympic Center Stadium, Tianjin.)
19:30 UTC+8		Live Report; Stats Report	Serginho 13'; Abe 27'; Doi 66'	Attendance: 8,718; Referee: Chris Beath (Australia)

Kashima Antlers won 5–0 on aggregate.

==== Semi-final ====
3 October 2018	Kashima Antlers	3–2	(South Korea) Suwon Samsung Bluewings	Kashima Soccer Stadium, Kashima
19:00 UTC+9	Jang Ho-ik 21' (o.g.); Serginho 84'; Uchida 90+3'	Live Report; Stats Report	Uchida 2' (o.g.); Damjanović 6'	Attendance: 13,044; Referee: Nawaf Shukralla (Bahrain)

24 October 2018	Suwon Samsung Bluewings (South Korea)	3–3	Kashima Antlers	Suwon World Cup Stadium, Suwon
19:00 UTC+9	Lim Sang-hyub 52'; Jo Sung-jin 53'; Damjanović 60'	Live Report; Stats Report	Yamamoto 25'; Nishi 64'; Serginho 82'	Attendance: 10,296; Referee: Mark Geiger (United States)

Kashima Antlers won 6–5 on aggregate.

==== Final ====
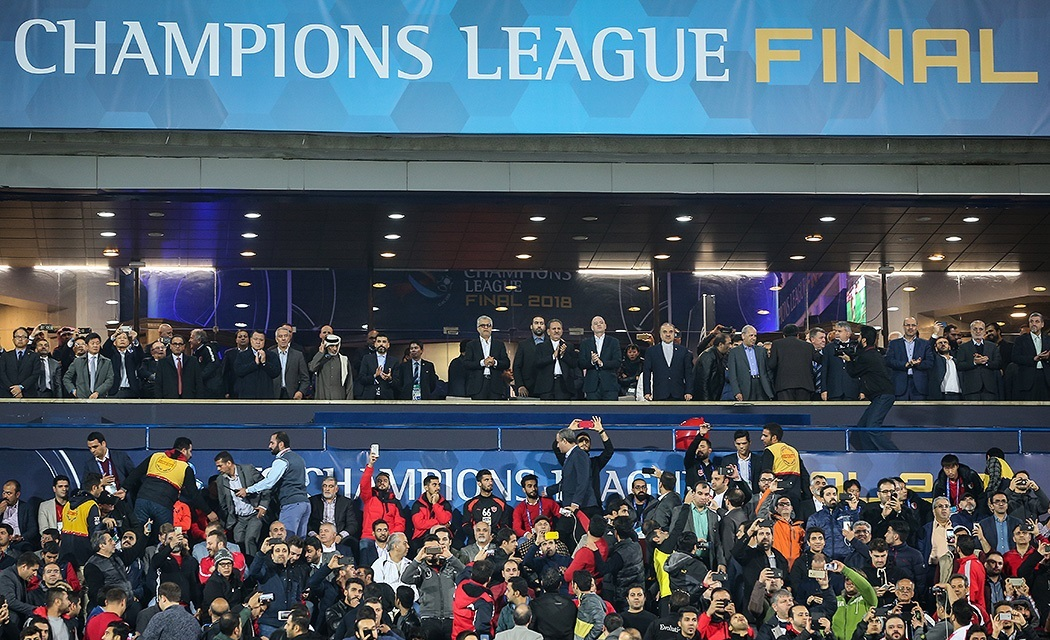
FIFA President Gianni Infantino and more than 100,000 fans watching the 2018 AFC Champions League Final at Azadi Stadium.

In the final, the two semi-final winners played each other, with the order of legs (first leg hosted by team from the East Region, second leg hosted by team from the West Region) reversed from the previous season's final.

3 November 2018
15:00 UTC+9

Kashima Antlers (Japan)	2–0	(Iran) Persepolis
Léo Silva 58'; Serginho 70'	Live Report; Stats Report

Kashima Soccer Stadium, Kashima
Attendance: 35,022
Referee: Ma Ning (China)
10 November 2018
18:30 UTC+3:30

Persepolis (Iran)	0–0	(Japan) Kashima Antlers
	Live Report; Stats Report

Azadi Stadium, Tehran
Attendance: 100,000
Referee: Ahmed Al-Kaf (Oman)

Kashima Antlers won 2–0 on aggregate.
