= Yuta Matsumura =

Yuta Matsumura may refer to:

- Yuta Matsumura (curler)
- Yūta Matsumura (footballer)
