= Hiroki Abe =

Japanese footballer

Hiroki Abe 安部 裕葵
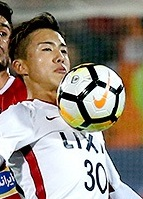
- Abe playing with Kashima Antlers in at the 2018 AFC Champions League Final

Personal information
- Full name: Hiroki Abe
- Date of birth: 28 January 1999 (age 27)
- Place of birth: Tokyo, Japan
- Height: 1.71 m (5 ft 7 in)
- Positions: Winger; forward

Team information
- Current team: FC Imabari
- Number: 22

Youth career
- –2010: Johoku Boreas FC
- 2011–2012: Teikyo FC
- 2013: ST FC
- 2014–2016: Setouchi High School

Senior career*
Years	Team	Apps	(Gls)
2017–2019	Kashima Antlers	49	(4)
2019–2023	Barcelona B	27	(4)
2023–2026	Urawa Red Diamonds	6	(0)
2026–	FC Imabari	6	(0)

International career^{‡}
2017–2018	Japan U19	4	(1)
2019	Japan U20	2	(0)
2019–	Japan	3	(0)
- * Club domestic league appearances and goals as of 15:24, 19 October 2026 (UTC) ‡ National team caps and goals as of 24 June 2019

Hiroki Abe (安部 裕葵, Abe Hiroki; born 28 January 1999) is a Japanese professional footballer who plays as a winger or a forward for J2 League club FC Imabari and Japan national team.

== Early life ==
Hiroki Abe attended high school at Setouchi High School before starting his professional career.

== Club career ==
=== Kashima Antlers ===
Abe notched ten goals and seven assists in two and a half years at Kashima Antlers. He made his J1 League debut on 1 April 2017 in a 1–0 away win against Omiya Ardija, replacing Pedro Júnior in the 74th minute. Abe then made his AFC Champions League debut in the group stage on 12 April, replacing Yuma Suzuki in the 61st minute. Abe started his first J-League match on 22 April but was substituted after the first half as Kashima Antlers were 2–0 down.

His next appearance for Antlers was on 21 June in the Emperor's Cup, where he played the full match, bagging his first two goals and an assist in a 5–0 win over FC Maruyasu Okazaki. On 29 July he scored his first league goal in a 3–0 win over Ventforet Kofu.

Abe began the 2018 season with appearances in the AFC Champions League and J1 League. In April of that year, he suffered a fracture in a lumbar vertebrae which kept him out for approximately four weeks. He recorded his first assist of the season on 20 May in a league match against Vegalta Sendai. Abe followed that up with seven consecutive starts between the Emperor's Cup and the J-League. On 6 June, he scored his first goal of the season and got another assist in the second round of the Emperor's Cup. League matches on 18 and 22 July saw Abe score in each of them. 9 September added another assist, this time in the quarter-finals of the J.League Cup against Kawasaki Frontale. On 18 September, Abe started and scored in the second leg of the AFC Champions League quarter-finals. He went on to impress and started both legs of the final with Antlers winning 2–0 on aggregate. For his performances in 2018, starting thirteen games in the league, he was named the J.League Rookie of the Year.

Due to their 2018 AFC Champions League win, Kashima Antlers qualified for the 2018 FIFA Club World Cup in the United Arab Emirates. Abe played in all three of their games: quarter-finals against Liga MX side C.D. Guadalajara in which he scored Antlers' third goal, semi-finals against La Liga side Real Madrid where Antlers lost 3–1, and the third place play-off against Argentina's River Plate.

Abe started the 2019 season by helping Kashima Antlers qualify for the AFC Champions League. He recorded two assists of the season on 9 and 14 April, in an AFC Champions League group match and a J-League match respectively. His only goal of the season came on 3 May in a J-League match against Shimizu S-Pulse, when he came on in the 64th minute and scored Antler's second goal of three.

=== Barcelona B ===
In July 2019, he transferred to Barcelona B on a four-year contract, for a reported transfer fee of €1.1 million. Abe said that it was a "difficult decision to leave the team mid-season" but that he believes "the various challenges...are absolutely necessary for [his] growth." Barcelona's club president Josep Maria Bartomeu said that he hoped Abe would become a leading player in La Liga. Abe played a total of 3,899 minutes for Kashima Antlers across two and a half seasons.

Abe scored his first goal for the reserves in a 3–3 draw against UE Cornellà on 17 November 2019. He followed this up with a header in the next match on 23 November, a 1–1 draw away versus Lleida Esportiu. He scored his first brace in a 3–1 win versus CF La Nucía on 15 December 2019.

On 2 February 2020, Abe ruptured a tendon in his right hamstring against AE Prat. He underwent a successful surgery which rendered him on the sidelines for an estimated five months, putting him in doubt for the 2020 Summer Olympics. However, the COVID-19 pandemic caused the competition to be delayed by a year.

=== Urawa Red Diamonds ===
In July 2023, Abe signed for J1 League club Urawa Red Diamonds following the expiration of his contract at Barcelona B.

=== FC Imabari ===
In July 2026, Abe transferred to J2 League club FC Imabari.

== International career ==
In March 2019, Hiroki Abe appeared in a series of under-20 friendly matches coached by Masanaga Kageyama. He played 32 minutes in a 4–1 loss against Poland and captained his side in the 1–0 loss against Argentina.

On 24 May 2019, Abe was called up by Japan's head coach Hajime Moriyasu to feature in the Copa América played in Brazil. He made his debut on 17 June 2019 in the game against Chile, as a 66th-minute substitute for Shoya Nakajima. He started the next match, a 2–2 draw against Uruguay and was substituted in the 67th minute for Ayase Ueda. In the final group match, Abe came on in the 82nd minute for Koji Miyoshi. Japan exited the competition being third place in their group with two points.

In December 2019, Abe was called to the under-22 team for a friendly against Jamaica's under-23s, where he scored a penalty kick in the 28th minute.

== Playing style ==
Hiroki Abe prefers to play on the left wing but can play on the right, behind the striker, and in a center forward position. Most of his appearances for Barcelona B have been on the left wing and as a center forward, and it is in this center position where he has scored his four goals in his first season as of February 2020.

== Career statistics ==
=== Club ===
As of 19 October 2026.

Appearances and goals by club, season and competition
Club	Season	League			National Cup (Note: Appearances in Emperor's Cup)		League Cup (Note: Appearance(s) in J.League Cup)		Continental (Note: Appearance(s) in AFC Champions League)		Other		Total	
Club	Season	Division	Apps	Goals	Apps	Goals	Apps	Goals	Apps	Goals	Apps	Goals	Apps	Goals
Kashima Antlers	2017	J1 League	13	1	2	2	1	1	1	0	—		17	4
Kashima Antlers	2018	J1 League	22	2	5	1	2	0	8	1	3 (Note: Appearances in FIFA Club World Cup)	1	40	5
Kashima Antlers	2019	J1 League	14	1	1	0	0	0	7	0	—		22	1
Kashima Antlers	Total		49	4	8	3	3	1	16	1	3	1	79	10
Barcelona B	2019–20	Segunda División B	20	4	—		—		—		—		20	4
Barcelona B	2020–21	Segunda División B	7 (Note: Includes four appearances in the second phase)	0	—		—		—		1 (Note: One appearance in Segunda División B play-offs)	0	8	0
Barcelona B	2021–22	Primera Federación	0	0	—		—		—		0	0	0	0
Barcelona B	2022–23	Primera Federación	0	0	—		—		—		0	0	0	0
Barcelona B	Total		27	4	—		—		—		1	0	28	4
Urawa Red Diamonds	2023	J1 League	0	0	0	0	0	0	—		—		0	0
Urawa Red Diamonds	2024	J1 League	0	0	0	0	0	0	—		—		0	0
Urawa Red Diamonds	2025	J1 League	2	0	0	0	0	0	0	0	0	0	2	0
Urawa Red Diamonds	2026	J1 (100)	4	0	–		–		0	0	0	0	4	0
Urawa Red Diamonds	Total		6	0	0	0	0	0	0	0	0	0	6	0
FC Imabari	2026–27	J2 League	6	0	1	0	0	0	–		–		7	0
Career total			88	8	9	3	3	1	16	1	4	1	120	14

== National team statistics ==
Japan national team
Year	Apps	Goals
2019	3	0
Total	3	0

== Honours ==
Kashima Antlers

- AFC Champions League: 2018

Individual

- J.League Rookie of the Year: 2018
