= J.League Best Young Player =

Japanese football award

The J.League Best Young Player (formerly known as the "J.League Rookie of the Year" from 1993 to 2019) is awarded by the J.League to the most outstanding rookie of the season. To be considered a rookie, a player must be in his first professional year of football (domestically or abroad).

Players names shown in bold were also named in the best eleven for that season.

Year	Footballer	Club	Position	Nationality
1993	Masaaki Sawanobori	Shimizu S-Pulse	MF	Japan
1994	Kazuaki Tasaka	Bellmare Hiratsuka	MF	Japan
1995	Yoshikatsu Kawaguchi	Yokohama Marinos	GK	Japan
1996	Toshihide Saito	Shimizu S-Pulse	DF	Japan
1997	Atsushi Yanagisawa	Kashima Antlers	FW	Japan
1998	**Shinji Ono**	Urawa Red Diamonds	MF	Japan
1999	**Yuji Nakazawa**	Verdy Kawasaki	DF	Japan
2000	Kazuyuki Morisaki	Sanfrecce Hiroshima	DF	Japan
2001	Koji Yamase	Consadole Sapporo	MF	Japan
2002	Keisuke Tsuboi	Urawa Red Diamonds	DF	Japan
2003	Daisuke Nasu	Yokohama F. Marinos	DF	Japan
2004	Takayuki Morimoto	Tokyo Verdy 1969	FW	Japan
2005	Robert Cullen	Júbilo Iwata	FW	Japan
2006	Jungo Fujimoto	Shimizu S-Pulse	MF	Japan
2007	Takanori Sugeno	Yokohama FC	GK	Japan
2008	**Yoshizumi Ogawa**	Nagoya Grampus	MF	Japan
2009	Kazuma Watanabe	Yokohama F. Marinos	FW	Japan
2010	Takashi Usami	Gamba Osaka	MF	Japan
2011	**Hiroki Sakai**	Kashiwa Reysol	DF	Japan
2012	Gaku Shibasaki	Kashima Antlers	MF	Japan
2013	Takumi Minamino	Cerezo Osaka	FW	Japan
2014	Caio	Kashima Antlers	MF	Brazil
2015	Takuma Asano	Sanfrecce Hiroshima	FW	Japan
2016	Yosuke Ideguchi	Gamba Osaka	MF	Japan
2017	Yuta Nakayama	Kashiwa Reysol	DF	Japan
2018	Hiroki Abe	Kashima Antlers	FW	Japan
2019	Ao Tanaka	Kawasaki Frontale	MF	Japan
2020	Ayumu Seko	Cerezo Osaka	DF	Japan
2021	Ryotaro Araki	Kashima Antlers	MF	Japan
2022	Mao Hosoya	Kashiwa Reysol	FW	Japan
2023	Shunsuke Mito	Albirex Niigata	MF	Japan
2024	Kōta Takai	Kawasaki Frontale	DF	Japan
2025	Ryūnosuke Satō	Fagiano Okayama	MF	Japan

== Wins by club ==
#	Club	Winners
1	Kashima Antlers	5
2	Shimizu S-Pulse	3
2	Yokohama F. Marinos	3
2	Kashiwa Reysol	3
5	Tokyo Verdy	2
5	Urawa Red Diamonds	2
5	Sanfrecce Hiroshima	2
5	Gamba Osaka	2
5	Cerezo Osaka	2
5	Kawasaki Frontale	2
11	Consadole Sapporo	1
11	Júbilo Iwata	1
11	Shonan Bellmare	1
11	Yokohama FC	1
11	Nagoya Grampus	1
11	Albirex Niigata	1
11	Fagiano Okayama	1

== See also ==
- J.League awards
