= Ryōtarō Araki =

Japanese footballer (born 2002)

Ryōtarō Araki 荒木 遼太郎
Personal information
- Date of birth: 29 January 2002 (age 24)
- Place of birth: Kumamoto, Japan
- Height: 1.70 m (5 ft 7 in)
- Positions: Attacking midfielder; forward

Team information
- Current team: Sint-Truiden
- Number: 71

Youth career
- Domingo Yamaga Kao
- –2013: Charme Kumamoto
- 2014–2016: Roasso Kumamoto
- 2017–2019: Higashi Fukuoka High School

Senior career*
Years	Team	Apps	(Gls)
2020–2026	Kashima Antlers	123	(14)
2024	→ FC Tokyo (loan)	29	(7)
2026–	Sint-Truiden	6	(1)

International career^{‡}
2018	Japan U16	2	(0)
Medal record
Men's football
Representing Japan
AFC U-23 Asian Cup
Gold medal – first place	2024 Qatar	Team
- * Club domestic league appearances and goals as of 22:15, 11 October 2026 (UTC) ‡ National team caps and goals as of 17:04, 23 February 2020 (UTC)

Ryōtarō Araki (荒木 遼太郎, Araki Ryōtarō; born 29 January 2002) is a Japanese footballer who plays as an attacking midfielder and as a forward for Belgian Pro League club Sint-Truiden.

== Youth career ==
Beginning his career at his hometown club Roasso Kumamoto in their junior youth section, he went on to attend Higashi Fukuoka High School. In 2018, he represented Japan U16 in the AFC U16 Championship. In Japan's first game in the tournament, he won the man of the match award after scoring two goals in a 5-2 win over Thailand. Japan went on to win the tournament, with Araki appearing in every game except for the semi-final. In his second year at Higashi Fukuoka HS, he was handed the number 10 shirt and was made captain of the team. Over two seasons, Araki made 30 appearances for the school scoring 10 goals across the Prince Takamado Cup, the All Japan High School Soccer Tournament, and the "Inter-High".

== Club career ==
=== Kashima Antlers ===
In October 2019, it was announced that Araki would join Kashima Antlers for the 2020 season, after graduating from Higashi Fukuoka High School. He made his debut for Kashima Antlers on 23 February 2020, coming on as a substitute in a 3-0 league defeat to Sanfrecce Hiroshima. He scored his first professional goal later on that season, scoring a 94th minute equaliser in a 2-2 draw against Vissel Kobe. He made 29 appearances in his debut season aged just 18 years old, and scored two league goals during the 2020 season. He improved his already impressive form in his second season, with almost 3000 minutes in 46 appearances across all competitions. In the 2021 J1 League, he scored 10 league goals and made 6 assists, totalling 16 goal contributions; the fifth most goal contributions in the league. He also was the first under-20 player to score a double-digit number of goals since Shoji Jo in 1994. His performances throughout the season rewarded him the J.League Rookie of the Year award.

In the following two seasons, Araki struggled for game time due to injuries (including a herniated disk) and only made 26 league appearances in 2022 and 2023.

=== Loan to FC Tokyo ===
In December 2023, he moved on loan to FC Tokyo for the 2024 season.

For FC Tokyo, he instantly became a starter since the opening round of the 2024 J1 League. In his debut against Cerezo Osaka on 24 February 2024, he scored a brace, followed by two more goals in his three next matches. After scoring 5 goals in his first 6 games, Araki then only scored 2 more throughout the remainder of the season, ending up with 7 goals and 4 assists in 29 league appearances.

=== Return to Kashima Antlers ===
In January 2025, it was confirmed that Araki would be returning to parent club Kashima Antlers ahead of the 2025 season.

=== Sint-Truiden ===
In July 2026, it was announced that Araki had been signed by Sint-Truiden for the 2026/27 season on an unknown contract.

== International career ==
Following his good form at the start of the 2024 season, he received a call-up U-23s for friendlies against Mali and Ukraine at the end of March. He did not feature in the match against Mali, but started against Ukraine, playing until the 66th minute.

In April 2024, Araki was called-up to represent Japan at the 2024 AFC U-23 Asian Cup. Starting three of the five matches he played, he scored a goal and gave two assists. His only goal came in the 2–0 win over Iraq, which qualified Japan for the 2024 Olympic Games. The last of his two assists at the tournament came in the last ten minutes of the match, as he assisted Fuki Yamada to score the winning goal in the 1–0 win in the final against Uzbekistan. Araki continued to play the match despite suffering a concussion following a clash with Uzbek goalkeeper Abduvohid Nematov in the 76th minute.

== Career statistics ==
=== Club ===
As of 11 October 2026.

Appearances and goals by club, season and competition
Club	Season	League			National cup (Note: Includes Emperors Cup, Belgian Cup)		League cup (Note: Includes J.League Cup)		Continental		Total	
Club	Season	Division	Apps	Goals	Apps	Goals	Apps	Goals	Apps	Goals	Apps	Goals
Kashima Antlers	2020	J1 League	26	2	0	0	3	0	—		29	2
Kashima Antlers	2021	J1 League	36	10	3	1	7	2	—		46	13
Kashima Antlers	2022	J1 League	13	1	0	0	4	0	—		17	1
Kashima Antlers	2023	J1 League	13	0	2	0	5	1	—		20	1
Kashima Antlers	2025	J1 League	19	0	2	0	2	0	—		23	0
Kashima Antlers	2026	J1 (100)	16	1	0	0	0	0	—		16	1
Kashima Antlers	Total		123	14	7	1	21	3	0	0	151	18
FC Tokyo (loan)	2024	J1 League	29	7	1	0	1	0	—		31	7
Sint-Truiden	2026–27	Belgian Pro League	6	1	0	0	—		2 (Note: Two appearances in UEFA Europa League)	0	8	1
Career total			158	22	8	1	23	3	1	0	190	26

== Honors ==
=== Club ===
Kashima Antlers

- J1 League: 2025

=== International ===
Japan U16

- AFC U-16 Championship: 2018

Japan U23

- AFC U-23 Asian Cup: 2024

=== Individual ===
- J.League Rookie of the Year: 2021
