= Daiki Sugioka =

Japanese footballer (born 1998)

Daiki Sugioka 杉岡 大暉
Personal information
- Full name: Daiki Sugioka
- Date of birth: 8 September 1998 (age 28)
- Place of birth: Adachi, Tokyo, Japan
- Height: 1.82 m (6 ft 0 in)
- Position: Left back

Team information
- Current team: Kashiwa Reysol
- Number: 26

Youth career
- Regista FC
- 2011–2013: FC Tokyo Fukagawa
- 2014–2016: Ichiritsu Funabashi High School

Senior career*
Years	Team	Apps	(Gls)
2017–2019	Shonan Bellmare	95	(5)
2020–2022	Kashima Antlers	14	(1)
2021–2022	→ Shonan Bellmare (loan)	37	(0)
2023–2024	Shonan Bellmare	48	(2)
2024	→ Machida Zelvia (loan)	12	(0)
2025–	Kashiwa Reysol	32	(1)

International career^{‡}
2017	Japan U-20	3	(0)
2018	Japan U-21	3	(0)
2018–	Japan U-23	6	(0)
2019–	Japan	5	(0)
Medal record
Shonan Bellmare
Winner	J.League Cup	2018
Men's football
Representing Japan
Asian Games
Silver medal – second place	2018 Jakarta-Palembang	Team
EAFF Championship
Winner	2022 Japan	Team
- * Club domestic league appearances and goals as of 10 August 2026 ‡ National team caps and goals as of 24 July 2022

Daiki Sugioka (杉岡 大暉, Sugioka Daiki; born 8 September 1998) is a Japanese footballer who plays as a left back for Kashiwa Reysol. He has also represented the Japan national team.

== Club career ==
=== Shonan Bellmare ===
Sugioka joined Shonan Bellmare in 2017 straight from Ichiritsu Funabashi High School, aged 17 and took the number 29 shirt. He was immediately involved in the first XI and was handed his J2 League debut by Cho Kwi-jae on 26 February 2017, a 1–0 win over Mito Hollyhock where Sugioka played the full 90 minutes. In his first home game, Sugioka scored his first professional goal in a 3–1 win over Thespakusatsu Gunma, after running past a number of defenders and scoring with a fine left-footed finish. Sugioka went on to make 37 appearances in his first full season – an integral part of the team that eventually won the league and gained promotion into the J1 League.

Sugioka made his J1 League debut in a 2–1 win over V-Varen Nagasaki and played 30 league games in total, with Shonan Bellmare finishing in 13th position in their first season back in the top-flight. The highlight of the season however lifting the 2018 J.League Cup after a 1–0 victory in the final against Yokohama F. Marinos. Sugioka scored the only goal of the game in the 36th minute, a strike from outside of the box into the top corner. This was their first time lifting the trophy.

Shonan couldn't carry their cup success of the 2018 season into the 2019 season and struggled throughout, getting knocked out at the group stages of the 2019 J.League Cup and finishing in 16th place in the league. Only a relegation playoff result against Tokushima Vortis saved them from being relegated. Sugioka made 34 appearances in all competitions, scoring two goals. He did appear for the first time in a continental competition, coming on as a second-half substitute in Shonan's 4–0 defeat to Athletico Paranaense in the J.League Cup / Copa Sudamericana Championship.

=== Kashima Antlers ===
In January 2020, Sugioka signed for Kashima Antlers. Sugioka struggled to break into the team in his first season at the club, only making eight appearances in all competitions. The second season in Kashima was similar to the first, with teammate Katsuya Nagato often preferred at left-back. Sugioka did score his first goal for Kashima in a 2–2 J.League Cup draw with Sagan Tosu.

=== Loan to Shonan Bellmare ===
In August 2021, it was announced that Sugioka would be returning to Shonan Bellmare for the remainder of the season. He started eight J1 League games in the second half of the 2021 season, and in December it was announced his loan would be extended for the whole of the 2022 season. Sugioka was a key player in the 2022 season for Shonan, making 36 appearances across all competitions and earning himself another call-up to the national team.

=== Shonan Bellmare ===
After impressing on loan throughout the 2022 season, Sugioka transferred permanently back to Shonan from Kashima ahead of the 2023 season. He made 39 appearances in his return season, scoring two goals and helped Shonan to avoid relegation from the top flight with a 15th-placed finish. In the 2024 season, Sugioka started the first five games of the season, but lost his place in the team to Taiga Hata and his game time was severely limited after March.

=== Loan to Machida Zelvia ===
In July 2024, Sugioka moved on loan to J1 League newcomers Machida Zelvia for the remainder of the 2024 season.

== International career ==
In May 2017, Sugioka was selected to play for the Japan U-20 national team for the 2017 U-20 World Cup. At this tournament, he played two full matches at left-back. He continued through the national youth teams, representing the U-21 national team at the 2018 Toulon Tournament and the U-23 national team at the 2018 Asian Games, where the team finished as runners-up after a 2-1 extra-time defeat to South Korea. He also represented the U-23s at the 2020 AFC U-23 Championship.

On May 24, 2019, Sugioka was called up by Japan's head coach Hajime Moriyasu to feature in the Copa América, played in Brazil. He made his debut on 17 June 2019 in a game against Chile, starting the game at left-back and playing the full 90 minutes. Sugioka went on to make two more appearances in the 2019 Copa América, but has not been capped since.

== Career statistics ==
=== Club ===
As of 6 August 2024.

Appearances and goals by club, season and competition
Club	Season	League			National Cup		League Cup		Other		Total	
Club	Season	Division	Apps	Goals	Apps	Goals	Apps	Goals	Apps	Goals	Apps	Goals
Japan			League		Emperor's Cup		J. League Cup		Other		Total	
Shonan Bellmare	2017	J2 League	37	3	1	0	–		–		38	3
Shonan Bellmare	2018	J1 League	30	1	1	0	5	1	–		36	2
Shonan Bellmare	2019	J1 League	28	2	0	0	4	0	2 (Note: Appearance in relegation playoff) (Note: Appearance in J.League Cup / Copa Sudamericana Championship)	0	34	2
Shonan Bellmare	Total		95	6	2	0	9	1	2	0	108	7
Kashima Antlers	2020	J1 League	7	0	0	0	1	0	–		8	0
Kashima Antlers	2021	J1 League	7	1	2	0	7	1	–		16	2
Kashima Antlers	Total		14	1	2	0	8	1	0	0	24	2
Shonan Bellmare (loan)	2021	J1 League	8	0	0	0	0	0	–		8	0
Shonan Bellmare (loan)	2022	J1 League	29	0	1	0	6	1	–		36	1
Shonan Bellmare (loan)	Total		37	0	1	0	6	1	0	0	44	1
Shonan Bellmare	2023	J1 League	33	2	3	0	3	0	–		39	2
Shonan Bellmare	2024	J1 League	15	0	1	0	1	0	–		17	0
Shonan Bellmare	Total		48	2	4	0	4	0	0	0	56	2
Machida Zelvia (loan)	2024	J1 League	1	0	0	0	0	0	–		1	0
Career total			195	9	9	0	27	3	2	0	233	12

=== International ===
As of match played 24 July 2022

Appearances and goals by national team and year
National team	Year	Apps	Goals
Japan	2019	3	0
Japan	2022	2	0
Total		5	0

== Honours ==
=== Club ===
Shonan Bellmare

- J2 League: 2017
- J.League Cup: 2018

=== International ===
- EAFF Championship: 2022
- Football at the 2018 Asian Games: 2018 Runner-up

=== Individual ===
- J. League Cup MVP: 2018
