= Kōki Machida =

Japanese footballer

Kōki Machida 町田 浩樹
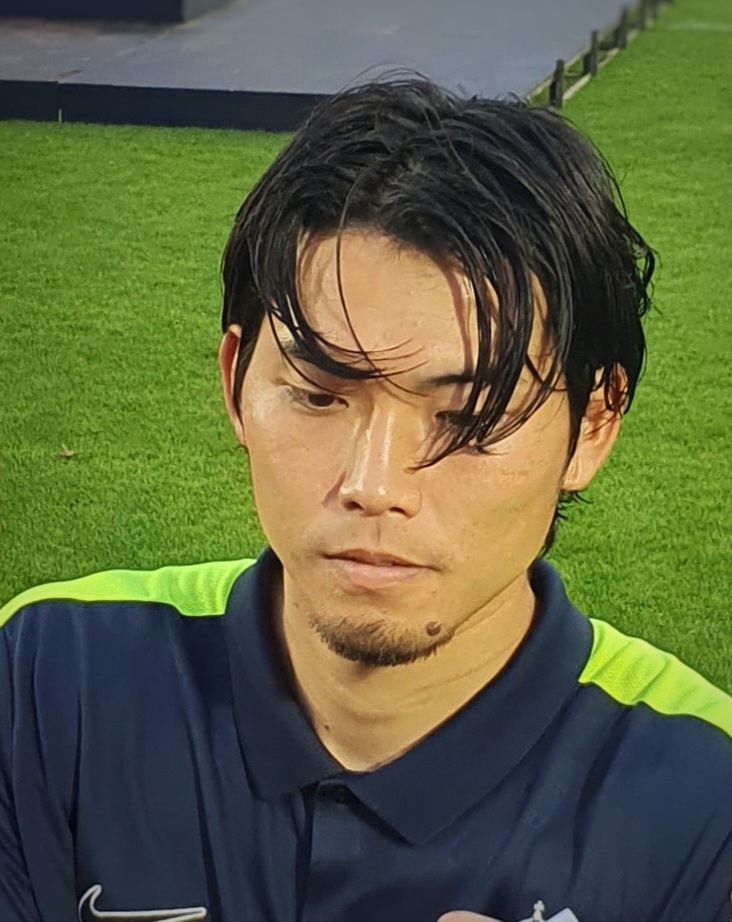
- Machida with Union SG in 2024

Personal information
- Full name: Kōki Machida
- Date of birth: 25 August 1997 (age 29)
- Place of birth: Tsukuba, Ibaraki, Japan
- Height: 1.90 m (6 ft 3 in)
- Position: Centre-back

Team information
- Current team: TSG Hoffenheim
- Number: 28

Youth career
- –2009: Teshirogi SC
- 2010–2015: Kashima Antlers

Senior career*
Years	Team	Apps	(Gls)
2016–2023	Kashima Antlers	87	(8)
2022–2023	→ Union Saint-Gilloise (loan)	19	(0)
2023–2025	Union Saint-Gilloise	65	(2)
2025–	TSG Hoffenheim	7	(0)

International career^{‡}
2021–2023	Japan U23	2	(0)
2023–	Japan	18	(0)
Medal record
Kashima Antlers
Winner	AFC Champions League	2018
Winner	J1 League	2016
Runner-up	J1 League	2017
Winner	Emperor's Cup	2016
Representing Japan
AFC U-19 Championship
Gold medal – first place	2016 Bahrain
- * Club domestic league appearances and goals as of 31 October 2026 ‡ National team caps and goals as of 14 November 2026

Kōki Machida (町田 浩樹, Machida Kōki; born 25 August 1997) is a Japanese professional footballer who plays as a centre-back for Bundesliga club TSG Hoffenheim and the Japan national team.

== Club career ==
=== Kashima Antlers ===
Machida joined J1 League club Kashima Antlers in 2016. On 25 May, he debuted in J.League Cup, in a match against Júbilo Iwata.

=== Union Saint-Gilloise ===
Machida joined the Belgian Pro League club, Union Saint-Gilloise on loan in January 2022, before signing a permanent contract a year later until 2026. On 9 May 2024, he scored the only goal against Antwerp in the 2024 Belgian Cup final, securing his club's first title in competition after 110 years.

=== TSG Hoffenheim ===
On June 25, 2025, Machida signed for Bundesliga club TSG Hoffenheim. Machida made his Bundesliga debut on 23 August in a 1–2 win against Bayer Leverkusen. However, he was forced to come off in the 45th minute because of an injury.

== Playing style ==
Machida is a left-footed centre-back whose playing style combines aerial strength, physical defending, positional awareness and technical ability in possession. Standing at 1.90 metres, he is particularly effective in aerial duels and physical confrontations with opposing attackers. He has identified his aerial ability and one-on-one defending as important strengths of his game. His left foot also provides an advantage when building attacks from the left side of the defensive line, allowing him to deliver diagonal passes towards the opposite flank and penetrating passes into central areas.

== Career statistics ==
=== Club ===
As of match played 31 October 2026

Appearances and goals by club, season and competition
Club	Season	League			National cup (Note: Includes Emperor's Cup, Belgian Cup)		League cup (Note: Includes J.League Cup)		Continental		Other		Total	
Club	Season	Division	Apps	Goals	Apps	Goals	Apps	Goals	Apps	Goals	Apps	Goals	Apps	Goals
Kashima Antlers	2016	J1 League	–		–		2	0	–		–		2	0
Kashima Antlers	2017	J1 League	2	0	–		–		0	0	0	0	2	0
Kashima Antlers	2018	J1 League	8	2	1	0	4	0	0	0	–		13	2
Kashima Antlers	2019	J1 League	22	1	5	0	–		10 (Note: Appearances in AFC Champions League)	0	–		37	1
Kashima Antlers	2020	J1 League	21	0	–		2	0	0	0	–		23	0
Kashima Antlers	2021	J1 League	34	5	2	0	3	0	–		–		39	5
Kashima Antlers	Total		87	8	8	0	11	0	10	0	0	0	116	8
Union SG (loan)	2021–22	Belgian Pro League	11	0	0	0	–		–		–		11	0
Union SG (loan)	2022–23	Belgian Pro League	8	0	1	0	–		1 (Note: Appearances in UEFA Europa League)	0	–		10	0
Union SG (loan)	Total		19	0	1	0	–		1	0	–		21	0
Union SG	2023–24	Belgian Pro League	31	1	3	2	–		11 (Note: Seven appearances in UEFA Europa League, four appearances in UEFA Europa Conference League)	0	–		45	3
Union SG	2024–25	Belgian Pro League	35	1	3	0	–		10 (Note: Two appearances in UEFA Champions League, eight appearances in UEFA Europa League)	0	1 (Note: Appearance in Belgian Super Cup)	0	49	1
Union SG	Total		65	2	6	2	–		21	0	1	0	94	4
TSG Hoffenheim	2025–26	Bundesliga	1	0	1	0	–		–		–		2	0
TSG Hoffenheim	2026–27	Bundesliga	6	0	1	0	–		3	1	–		10	1
TSG Hoffenheim	Total		7	0	2	0	–		3	1	–		12	1
Career total			177	10	17	2	11	0	35	1	1	0	241	13

=== International ===
As of match played 14 November 2026

Appearances and goals by national team and year
National team	Year	Apps	Goals
Japan	2023	5	0
Japan	2024	11	0
Japan	2025	1	0
Japan	2026	1	0
Total		18	0

== Honours ==
Union SG

- Belgian Pro League: 2024–25
- Belgian Cup: 2023–24
- Belgian Super Cup: 2024
