= Shoma Doi =

Japanese footballer

Shoma Doi 土居 聖真
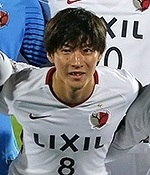
- Doi with Kashima Antlers at the 2018 AFC Champions League Final

Personal information
- Full name: Shoma Doi
- Date of birth: 21 May 1992 (age 34)
- Place of birth: Yamagata, Yamagata, Japan
- Height: 1.72 m (5 ft 8 in)
- Positions: Attacking midfielder; forward

Team information
- Current team: Montedio Yamagata
- Number: 8

Youth career
- –2004: OSA Fortuna Oyama
- 2005–2010: Kashima Antlers

Senior career*
Years	Team	Apps	(Gls)
2011–2024	Kashima Antlers	332	(52)
2024–	Montedio Yamagata	58	(15)

International career^{‡}
2017	Japan	2	(0)
Medal record
Kashima Antlers
Winner	AFC Champions League	2018
Winner	J1 League	2016
Runner-up	J1 League	2017
Winner	J.League Cup	2011
Winner	J.League Cup	2012
Winner	J.League Cup	2015
Winner	Emperor's Cup	2016
- * Club domestic league appearances and goals as of 13 August 2026 ‡ National team caps and goals as of 16 December 2017

Shoma Doi (土居 聖真, Doi Shoma; born 21 May 1992) is a Japanese professional footballer who plays as an attacking midfielder for J2 League club Montedio Yamagata. He has 2 caps for the Japan national football team.

== Club career ==
=== Kashima Antlers ===
After graduating from Nakayama Municipal Nagasaki Elementary School, he left his hometown of Yamagata and joined Kashima Antlers' youth setup and became part of the first team squad in 2011. Doi made his Kashima debut aged 19 in a 3–0 league win against Shimizu S-Pulse, appearing as an 85th-minute substitute. Despite a small amount of gametime in his first two seasons, he was part of the squad that won back-to-back J.League Cup titles and the 2012 J.League Cup / Copa Sudamericana Championship.

Doi was given more game time in the 2013 season and he scored his first goal for Kashima in a 3–2 victory over Júbilo Iwata. He also started in the 2013 J.League Cup / Copa Sudamericana Championship, which Kashima went on to win again after a 3–2 victory over São Paulo.

His breakout season was in 2014, where he scored 9 goals in all competitions from midfield, playing in 41 matches. For the 2015 season, he changed from the number 28 shirt to the number 8, previously worn by long-term Kashima players Mitsuo Ogasawara and Takuya Nozawa, displaying his rise in importance to the team. During this season, he made his debut in the AFC Champions League where he scored Kashima's only goal in a 3–1 defeat to Western Sydney Wanderers.

The 2016 season was an extremely successful one for both Doi and Kashima. Doi was a key contributor in Kashima winning the league title and the Emperor's Cup. He scored 10 goals in all competitions, finishing as Kashima's second top scorer. Winning the league meant Kashima were to participate in the 2016 FIFA Club World Cup, which had been a dream for Doi since his first year of turning pro. Kashima made it all the way to the final, narrowly losing in extra-time to Real Madrid with Doi winning plaudits for his performance during the competition, contributing with 1 goal and 3 assists. In Kashima's 3–0 semi-final victory over Atlético Nacional, Doi made history as the first player to score a penalty from a decision made by VAR at a FIFA competition.

Doi and Kashima added another trophy in 2017, winning the Japanese Super Cup after a 3–2 victory over 2016 runners-up Urawa Red Diamonds. Doi again was a key part of the team with 46 appearances and 5 goals across all competitions, almost winning back-to-back league titles if not for a final day 0–0 draw with Júbilo Iwata to lose out on goal difference. His performances earned him a national team call-up in 2017.

In the 2018 season, he played 54 games across all competitions, scoring an impressive 13 goals, second in the scoring charts only to forward Yuma Suzuki as Kashima finished the league season in 3rd place. In cup competitions, Doi scored the only goal of the 2018 Emperor's Cup quarter-final against Ventforet Kofu, where Kashima eventually lost in the semi-finals. He also scored in the second leg of the 2018 J.League Cup semi-final against Yokohama F. Marinos, but it wasn't enough to avoid an agonising 4–3 aggregate defeat. The overriding achievement of the year was the 2018 AFC Champions League win – the first time Kashima had won the competition. Doi played a part in 13 of the 14 games on the road to the finals, scoring 3 goals – including at the quarter-final stage in a 3–0 victory over Tianjin Quanjian. He also started both games in the finals against Persepolis. The victory meant that Kashima would once again take part in the Club World Cup, where after a 3–2 victory over Guadalajara in which Doi won the man of the match award, they progressed to the semi-final to once again play Real Madrid. Before the semi-final, Doi himself said he was "delighted" to play against Real Madrid again. Madrid ended up as comfortable 3–1 winners, but Doi managed to score a consolation goal, in spite of a VAR review.

Doi was again ever-present during the 2019 season as Kashima again finished 3rd in the league, again reached the J.League Cup semi-finals and were runners-up in the 2019 Emperor's Cup after a 2–0 defeat to Vissel Kobe. Doi scored his 50th goal for the club in the 2019 season, in the 3–0 league victory over Shimizu S-Pulse. He also scored two important goals (including a strike from 40 metres out) in a 2019 AFC Champions League game against Sanfrecce Hiroshima, which put them through on away goals into the quarter-finals. Despite the efforts of Doi, both the 2019 and 2020 seasons ended without a trophy for Kashima.

=== Montedio Yamagata ===
In July 2024, it was announced that Doi would be permanently transferring to J2 League club Montedio Yamagata after 14 seasons with Kashima.

== International career ==
After his sterling 2017 season, Doi was called up to the national team by coach Vahid Halilhodzic for the first time to replace Hiroshi Kiyotake. He would be part of the squad taking part in the 2017 EAFF E-1 Football Championship. Wearing the number 13 shirt and starting the game from the left-wing, Doi made his international debut in a 2–1 win for Japan over China PR, where he played 82 minutes before being replaced by Hiroyuki Abe. He then went on to play one more game for the national team in the same competition, in a 4–1 defeat to South Korea. He has not been called up again since the 2017 season.

== Career statistics ==
=== Club ===
As of 25 July 2024.

Appearances and goals by club, season and competition
Club	Season	League			National Cup		League Cup		Continental		Other		Total	
Club	Season	Division	Apps	Goals	Apps	Goals	Apps	Goals	Apps	Goals	Apps	Goals	Apps	Goals
Japan			League		Emperor's Cup		J.League Cup		AFC		Other		Total	
Kashima Antlers	2011	J1 League	2	0	0	0	0	0	–		–		2	0
Kashima Antlers	2012	J1 League	4	0	2	0	2	0	–		–		8	0
Kashima Antlers	2013	J1 League	15	2	2	0	1	0	–		1 (Note: Appearance in the Suruga Bank Championship)	0	19	2
Kashima Antlers	2014	J1 League	34	8	1	0	6	1	–		–		41	9
Kashima Antlers	2015	J1 League	28	6	1	0	2	0	6	3	–		37	9
Kashima Antlers	2016	J1 League	30	8	5	1	5	1	–		8 (Note: Appearances in the J.League Championship, J.League Cup / Copa Sudamericana Championship and 2016 Club World Cup)	1	48	11
Kashima Antlers	2017	J1 League	33	3	3	1	2	1	7	0	1 (Note: Appearance in the Japanese Super Cup)	0	46	5
Kashima Antlers	2018	J1 League	29	5	5	3	4	1	13	3	3 (Note: Appearances in the 2018 Club World Cup)	1	54	13
Kashima Antlers	2019	J1 League	32	5	4	1	4	1	9	2	–		49	9
Kashima Antlers	2020	J1 League	31	6	0	0	2	0	1	0	–		34	6
Kashima Antlers	2021	J1 League	36	6	3	0	6	0	–		–		45	6
Kashima Antlers	2022	J1 League	23	1	5	0	7	2	–		–		35	3
Kashima Antlers	2023	J1 League	24	2	2	0	7	0	–		–		33	2
Kashima Antlers	2024	J1 League	11	0	1	0	1	0	–		–		13	0
Kashima Antlers	Total		332	52	34	6	49	7	36	8	13	2	464	75
Montedio Yamagata	2024	J2 League	0	0	0	0	0	0	–		–		0	0
Career total			332	52	34	6	49	7	36	8	13	2	464	75

=== International ===
As of match played 16 December 2017

Japan national team
Year	Apps	Goals
2017	2	0
Total	2	0

== Honours ==
=== Club ===
Kashima Antlers

- J.League Cup (3) : 2011, 2012, 2015
- Suruga Bank Championship (2) : 2012, 2013
- J1 League: (1) 2016
- Emperor's Cup: (1) 2016
- Japanese Super Cup: (1) 2017
- AFC Champions League: (1) 2018
