= Naoki Hayashi =

Japanese footballer (born 1998)

Personal information
- Date of birth: 9 June 1998 (age 28)
- Place of birth: Osaka, Japan
- Height: 1.81 m (5 ft 11 in)
- Position: Centre back

Team information
- Current team: Tokyo Verdy
- Number: 4

Youth career
- Rip Ace SC
- 2014–2016: Rissho University Shonan High School

College career
Years	Team	Apps	(Gls)
2017–2020	Osaka University H&SS		

Senior career*
Years	Team	Apps	(Gls)
2021–2024	Kashima Antlers	7	(0)
2023–2024	→ Tokyo Verdy (loan)	52	(3)
2025–	Tokyo Verdy	26	(1)
- * Club domestic league appearances and goals as of 8 August 2026

Naoki Hayashi (林 尚輝, Hayashi Naoki; born 9 June 1998) is a Japanese professional footballer who plays as a centre back for J1 League club Tokyo Verdy.

== Career ==
Hayashi joined J2 League club Tokyo Verdy on loan for the 2023 season. He helped them gain promotion to the J1 League, making 23 appearances and scoring 3 goals. His loan was extended in December 2023 for the 2024 season.

In December 2024, it was announced that Hayashi would be joining Tokyo Verdy on a permanent transfer.

== Career statistics ==
=== Club ===
As of end of 2024 season.

Appearances and goals by club, season and competition
Club	Season	League			Cup		League Cup		Other		Total	
Club	Season	Division	Apps	Goals	Apps	Goals	Apps	Goals	Apps	Goals	Apps	Goals
Japan			League		Emperor's Cup		J.League Cup		Other		Total	
Kashima Antlers	2021	J1 League	6	0	3	1	8	1	–		17	2
Kashima Antlers	2022	J1 League	1	0	0	0	0	0	–		1	0
Kashima Antlers	Total		7	0	3	1	8	1	0	0	18	2
Tokyo Verdy (loan)	2023	J2 League	23	3	0	0	–		2 (Note: Appearances in J1/J2 play-offs)	0	25	3
Tokyo Verdy (loan)	2024	J1 League	29	0	2	0	1	0	0	0	32	0
Tokyo Verdy (loan)	Total		52	3	2	0	1	0	2	0	57	3
Career total			59	3	5	1	9	1	2	0	75	5
