= Yu Funabashi =

Japanese footballer

Yu Funabashi 舩橋 佑
Personal information
- Date of birth: 12 July 2002 (age 24)
- Place of birth: Koga, Ibaraki, Japan
- Height: 1.75 m (5 ft 9 in)
- Position: Defensive midfielder

Team information
- Current team: Mito HollyHock (on loan from Kashima Antlers)
- Number: 20

Youth career
- 2013–2020: Kashima Antlers

Senior career*
Years	Team	Apps	(Gls)
2021–	Kashima Antlers	58	(2)
2026–	→ Mito HollyHock (loan)	0	(0)
- * Club domestic league appearances and goals as of 10:12, 4 August 2026 (UTC)

Yu Funabashi (舩橋 佑, Funabashi Yu; born 12 July 2002) is a Japanese professional footballer who plays as a defensive midfielder for J1 League club Mito HollyHock, on loan from Kashima Antlers.

== Career statistics ==
=== Club ===
As of 4 August 2026.

Appearances and goals by club, season and competition
Club	Season	League			National cup (Note: Includes Emperors Cup)		League cup (Note: Includes J.League Cup)		Total	
Club	Season	Division	Apps	Goals	Apps	Goals	Apps	Goals	Apps	Goals
Kashima Antlers	2021	J1 League	2	0	0	0	3	0	5	0
Kashima Antlers	2022	J1 League	13	0	3	0	3	0	19	0
Kashima Antlers	2023	J1 League	8	0	1	0	2	0	11	0
Kashima Antlers	2024	J1 League	4	0	2	0	0	0	6	0
Kashima Antlers	2025	J1 League	31	2	4	0	2	0	37	2
Kashima Antlers	2026	J1 (100)	0	0	0	0	0	0	0	0
Kashima Antlers	Total		58	2	10	0	10	0	78	2
Career total			58	2	10	0	10	0	78	2

== Honours ==
=== Club ===
Kashima Antlers

- J1 League: 2025
