= Tomoya Inukai =

Japanese footballer (born 1993)

Tomoya Inukai 犬飼 智也
Personal information
- Full name: Tomoya Inukai
- Date of birth: May 12, 1993 (age 33)
- Place of birth: Suruga-ku, Shizuoka, Japan
- Height: 1.82 m (6 ft 0 in)
- Position: Centre back

Team information
- Current team: Kashiwa Reysol
- Number: 13

Youth career
- –2005: Tohgendai FC
- 2006–2011: Shimizu S-Pulse

Senior career*
Years	Team	Apps	(Gls)
2012–2017	Shimizu S-Pulse	63	(1)
2013–2014	→ Matsumoto Yamaga (loan)	63	(9)
2018–2022	Kashima Antlers	111	(10)
2022–2023	Urawa Red Diamonds	6	(1)
2023	→ Kashiwa Reysol (loan)	12	(0)
2024–	Kashiwa Reysol	37	(1)
Medal record
Shimizu S-Pulse
Runner-up	J.League Cup	2012
Kashima Antlers
Winner	AFC Champions League	2018
- * Club domestic league appearances and goals as of 10 August 2026

Tomoya Inukai (犬飼 智也, Inukai Tomoya; born May 12, 1993) is a Japanese footballer who plays for J1 League club Kashiwa Reysol.

After starting his career with Shimizu S-Pulse, Inukai has spent most of his career in the J1 League, making over 180 appearances in the league.

== Career ==
Inukai started his career with Shimizu S-Pulse in 2012, after graduating from the youth teams. He made his league debut against Urawa Red Diamonds on 25 August 2012.

On 28 June 2013, Inukai was announced at Matsumoto Yamaga on a six month loan. After playing 21 league matches and scoring 3 goals, he extended his loan contract for a year with the club in December 2013.

During the 2016 season with Shimizu S-Pulse, Inukai was appointed as a vice-captain.

On 6 January 2018, Inukai was announced at Kashima Antlers on a permanent transfer. He made 111 league appearances during his time with the club.

On 25 December 2021, Inukai was announced at Urawa Red Diamonds on a permanent transfer. On 4 April 2022, the club announced that he was injured during the match against Hokkaido Consadole Sapporo and would be out for six months.

On 24 July 2023, Inukai was announced on loan at Kashiwa Reysol. He was announced on a permanent transfer on 29 December 2023. Inukai won the May 2024 Goal of the Month award for his 35 yard strike against FC Tokyo. He was named Kashiwa Reysol's captain ahead of the 2025 season.

== Personal life ==
Inukai owns a cafe in Kashiwa called TONES COFFEE ROASTERS. He has been affectionally nicknamed "Wan-chan".

== Club statistics ==
As of 27 July 2023.

Club performance			League		Cup		League Cup		Continental		Other		Total	
Season	Club	League	Apps	Goals	Apps	Goals	Apps	Goals	Apps	Goals	Apps	Goals	Apps	Goals
Japan			League		Emperor's Cup		J. League Cup		AFC		Other		Total	
2012	Shimizu S-Pulse	J1 League	1	0	1	0	1	0	-		-		3	0
2013	Shimizu S-Pulse	J1 League	0	0	0	0	2	0	-		-		2	0
2013	Matsumoto Yamaga	J2 League	21	3	2	0	-		-		-		23	3
2014	Matsumoto Yamaga	J2 League	42	6	2	0	-		-		-		44	6
2015	Shimizu S-Pulse	J1 League	20	0	1	0	2	0	-		-		23	0
2016	Shimizu S-Pulse	J2 League	26	1	1	1	-		-		-		27	2
2017	Shimizu S-Pulse	J1 League	16	0	0	0	0	0	-		-		16	0
2018	Kashima Antlers	J1 League	22	1	4	0	4	1	10	0	-		40	2
2019	Kashima Antlers	J1 League	29	2	3	0	4	1	10	0	1	0	47	3
2020	Kashima Antlers	J1 League	31	2	-		1	0	1	0	-		33	2
2021	Kashima Antlers	J1 League	29	5	2	0	6	0	-		-		37	5
2022	Urawa Red Diamonds	J1 League	6	1	0	0	0	0	-		1 (Note: Appearance in the Japanese Super Cup)	0	7	1
2023	Urawa Red Diamonds	J1 League	0	0	1	0	3	0	0	0	-		4	0
2023	Kashiwa Reysol (loan)	J1 League	0	0	0	0	0	0	-		-		0	0
Career Total			243	21	17	1	23	2	21	0	2	0	306	24

== Honours ==
=== Club ===
Urawa Red Diamonds

- Japanese Super Cup: 2022
- AFC Champions League: 2022
