= Yūta Matsumura (footballer) =

Japanese footballer (born 2001)

Yūta Matsumura 松村 優太
Personal information
- Date of birth: 13 April 2001 (age 25)
- Place of birth: Osaka, Japan
- Height: 1.73 m (5 ft 8 in)
- Position: Winger

Team information
- Current team: Kashima Antlers
- Number: 27

Youth career
- Osaka Higashiyodogawa FC
- 2017–2019: Shizuoka Gakuen High School

Senior career*
Years	Team	Apps	(Gls)
2020–	Kashima Antlers	135	(10)
2024	→ Tokyo Verdy (loan)	12	(0)

International career^{‡}
2019	Japan U18	2	(0)
2022	Japan U20	1	(0)
2022–	Japan U21	5	(0)
Medal record
Men's football
Representing Japan
Asian Games
Silver medal – second place	2022 Hangzhou	Team
- * Club domestic league appearances and goals as of 9 August 2026 ‡ National team caps and goals as of 18:56, 25 June 2023 (UTC)

Yūta Matsumura (松村 優太, Matsumura Yūta; born 13 April 2001) is a Japanese professional footballer who plays as a winger for J1 League club Kashima Antlers.

== Career ==
In July 2024, Matsumura joined Tokyo Verdy on a season-long loan deal. After 12 games for Verdy, he returned to Kashima at the end of the 2024 season.

== International career ==
On 30 May 2024, Matsumura was called up for the Japan U23s.

== Career statistics ==
=== Club ===
As of 21 October 2026.

Appearances and goals by club, season and competition
Club	Season	League			National cup (Note: Includes Emperor's Cup)		League cup (Note: Includes J.League Cup)		Continental		Total	
Club	Season	Division	Apps	Goals	Apps	Goals	Apps	Goals	Apps	Goals	Apps	Goals
Kashima Antlers	2020	J1 League	13	0	0	0	2	1	0	0	15	1
Kashima Antlers	2021	J1 League	22	2	3	1	8	1	0	0	33	4
Kashima Antlers	2022	J1 League	12	1	2	0	2	0	0	0	16	1
Kashima Antlers	2023	J1 League	20	2	1	0	5	2	0	0	26	4
Kashima Antlers	2024	J1 League	7	0	0	0	2	0	0	0	9	0
Kashima Antlers	2025	J1 League	38	3	4	0	1	0	0	0	43	3
Kashima Antlers	2026	J1 (100)	12	0	–		–		0	0	12	0
Kashima Antlers	2026–27	J1 League	11	2	2	0	0	0	2 (Note: Appearances in AFC Champions League Elite)	0	15	2
Kashima Antlers	Total		135	10	12	1	20	4	2	0	169	15
Tokyo Verdy (loan)	2024	J1 League	12	0	–		–		–		12	0
Career total			147	10	12	1	20	4	2	0	181	15

== Honours ==
=== Club ===
Kashima Antlers

- J1 League: 2025
