= Yuma Suzuki =

Japanese footballer (born 1996)

Yuma Suzuki 鈴木 優磨
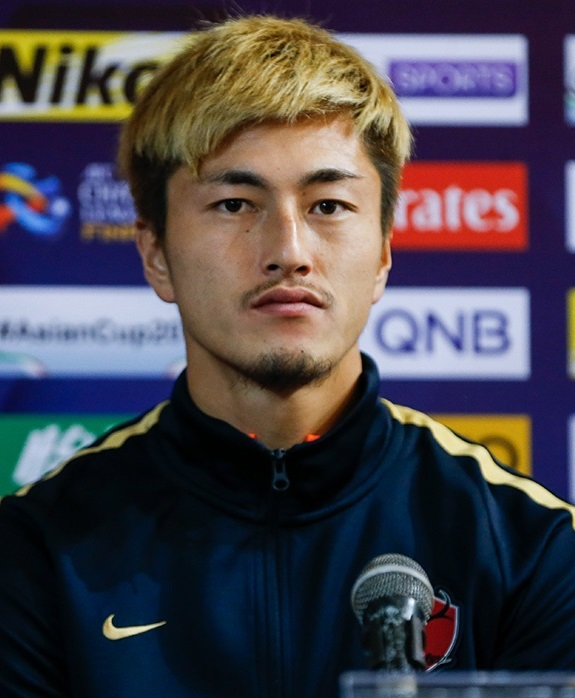
- Suzuki with Kashima Antlers in 2018

Personal information
- Full name: Yuma Suzuki
- Date of birth: 28 April 1996 (age 30)
- Place of birth: Chōshi, Chiba, Japan
- Height: 1.82 m (6 ft 0 in)
- Position: Striker

Team information
- Current team: Kashima Antlers
- Number: 40

Youth career
- 2003–2014: Kashima Antlers

Senior career*
| Years | Team | Apps | (Gls) |
| 2015 | → J.League U-22 (loan) | 9 | (3) |
| 2015-2019 | Kashima Antlers | 96 | (27) |
| 2019–2022 | Sint-Truiden | 67 | (26) |
| 2022– | Kashima Antlers | 159 | (52) |
Medal record
Kashima Antlers
| Winner | J1 League | 2025 |
| Winner | AFC Champions League | 2018 |
| Winner | J1 League | 2016 |
| Runner-up | J1 League | 2017 |
| Winner | J.League Cup | 2015 |
| Winner | Emperor's Cup | 2016 |
- * Club domestic league appearances and goals as of 11 August 2026

Yuma Suzuki (鈴木 優磨, Suzuki Yūma; born 26 April 1996) is a Japanese professional footballer who plays as a striker for J1 League club, Kashima Antlers.

== Club career ==
=== Kashima Antlers ===
Suzuki joined the Kashima Antlers youth system at the age of 7 in 2003. After scoring two goals and leading Kashima Antlers to their first ever AFC Champions League title in 2018, Suzuki was named MVP of the competition.

He was chosen as one of the candidates for 2018 Asian Footballer of the Year.

=== Sint-Truiden ===
On 15 July 2019, Suzuki joined Belgian First Division A club Sint-Truiden. Suzuki scored his first goal for his new club on 21 September 2019, opening the scoring in his side's 3–0 victory over Sporting Charleroi.

On 30 November 2019, Suzuki headed in the winning goal as Sint-Truiden upset defending league champions Genk, to move up to 10th in the league table.

=== Return to Kashima Antlers ===
On 3 January 2022, his departure from Sint-Truiden was announced. He returned to his former club Kashima Antlers. This marked his 6th season in Japan's top flight league (J1 League), where he played from the start of his career in 2015, until transferring overseas in 2019.

On 30 January 2024, Suzuki was injured and would spend 5 weeks out. On 4 December 2023, he was nominated as one of 34 players to win the 2023 J.League MVP Award. On 11 June 2024, he won the Meiji Yasuda J1 KONAMI Monthly MVP award for May.

== International career ==
His debut call-up to the Japan national team was on 7 November 2018 for the Kirin Cup, but he was excluded because of suffering an ankle sprain in his club's AFC Champions League match.

== Personal life ==
Yuma's elder brother, Shota who currently play in Blaublitz Akita.

== Career statistics ==
=== Club ===
As of the end from 2025 season.

Appearances and goals by club, season and competition
| Club performance | | | League | | National Cup (Note: Appearances in the Emperor's Cup and Belgian Cup) | | League Cup (Note: Appearances in the J.League Cup) | | Continental | | Other | | Total | |
| Club | Season | League | Apps | Goals | Apps | Goals | Apps | Goals | Apps | Goals | Apps | Goals | Apps | Goals |
|---|---|---|---|---|---|---|---|---|---|---|---|---|---|---|
| Kashima Antlers | 2015 | J1 League | 7 | 2 | 2 | 0 | 1 | 0 | 0 | 0 | — | | 10 | 2 |
| Kashima Antlers | 2016 | J1 League | 31 | 8 | 6 | 2 | 6 | 0 | 3 | 1 | 5 (Note: 3 appearances, 1 goal in the FIFA Club World Cup, 1 appearance in the J.League Championship, 1 appearance in the J.League Cup / Copa Sudamericana Championship) | 1 | 48 | 11 |
| Kashima Antlers | 2017 | J1 League | 26 | 6 | 4 | 2 | 2 | 2 | 8 | 4 | 1 (Note: Appearance in the Japanese Super Cup) | 1 | 41 | 15 |
| Kashima Antlers | 2018 | J1 League | 32 | 11 | 4 | 4 | 2 | 0 | 14 | 2 | — | | 52 | 17 |
| Kashima Antlers | Total | | 96 | 27 | 16 | 8 | 11 | 2 | 22 | 6 | 6 | 2 | 151 | 45 |
| J.League U-22 (loan) | 2015 | J3 League | 9 | 3 | 0 | 0 | — | | — | | — | | 9 | 3 |
| Sint-Truiden | 2019–20 | Belgian First Division A | 24 | 7 | 1 | 0 | — | | — | | — | | 25 | 7 |
| Sint-Truiden | 2020–21 | Belgian First Division A | 32 | 17 | 1 | 0 | — | | — | | — | | 33 | 17 |
| Sint-Truiden | 2021–22 | Belgian First Division A | 11 | 2 | 0 | 0 | — | | — | | — | | 11 | 2 |
| Sint-Truiden | Total | | 67 | 26 | 2 | 0 | — | | — | | — | | 69 | 26 |
| Kashima Antlers | 2022 | J1 League | 32 | 7 | 4 | 2 | 5 | 2 | — | | — | | 41 | 11 |
| Kashima Antlers | 2023 | J1 League | 33 | 14 | 1 | 0 | 7 | 0 | — | | — | | 41 | 14 |
| Kashima Antlers | 2024 | J1 League | 36 | 15 | 4 | 1 | 2 | 0 | — | | — | | 42 | 16 |
| Kashima Antlers | 2025 | J1 League | 38 | 10 | 4 | 4 | 2 | 0 | — | | — | | 44 | 14 |
| Kashima Antlers | 2026 | J1 100 Year Vision League | 19 | 6 | — | | — | | — | | — | | 19 | 6 |
| Kashima Antlers | 2026–27 | J1 League | 1 | 0 | 0 | 0 | 0 | 0 | 0 | 0 | — | | 1 | 0 |
| Kashima Antlers | Total | | 159 | 52 | 13 | 7 | 16 | 2 | — | | — | | 188 | 61 |
| Career total | | | 331 | 108 | 31 | 15 | 27 | 4 | 22 | 6 | 6 | 2 | 417 | 135 |

== Honours ==
=== Club ===
Kashima Antlers

- J1 League: 2016, 2025
- Emperor's Cup: 2016
- J.League Cup: 2015
- Japanese Super Cup: 2017
- AFC Champions League: 2018

=== Individual ===
- AFC Champions League Best Player: 2018
- J1 League Monthly MVP: May 2024
- J1 100 Year Vision League Regional Round East Best Eleven: 2026
