= Katsuya Nagato =

Japanese footballer

Katsuya Nagato 永戸 勝也
Personal information
- Date of birth: 15 January 1995 (age 31)
- Place of birth: Sakura, Chiba, Japan
- Height: 1.72 m (5 ft 8 in)
- Position: Left back

Team information
- Current team: Vissel Kobe
- Number: 41

Youth career
- 2001–2006: Nakashizu SC
- 2007–2009: PBJ Chiba
- 2010–2012: Yachiyo High School

College career
Years	Team	Apps	(Gls)
2013–2016	Hosei University		

Senior career*
Years	Team	Apps	(Gls)
2017–2019	Vegalta Sendai	76	(2)
2020–2021	Kashima Antlers	51	(1)
2022–2025	Yokohama F. Marinos	89	(5)
2025–	Vissel Kobe	39	(3)
Medal record
Vegalta Sendai
Runner-up	Emperor's Cup	2018
- * Club domestic league appearances and goals as of 10 August 2026

Katsuya Nagato (永戸 勝也, Nagato Katsuya; born 15 January 1995) is a Japanese professional footballer who plays as a left back for J1 League club Vissel Kobe.

== Youth career ==
Starting out as a forward for his elementary school, Nagato was advised by his junior high school manager to convert to a left-back – the position he still currently plays. He went on to study at the same school as his older brother, Yachiyo High School. Nagato and the team advanced to a couple of national championships, although they were knocked out in the first round of both. Nagato then went on to study and play for Hosei University – making 75 appearances and scoring 7 goals between 2013 and 2016.

== Club career ==
In 2016, it was announced he would be joining J1 League side Vegalta Sendai. He made his debut in February 2017, playing 89 minutes in a 1-0 victory over Kashiwa Reysol, before being replaced by Tatsuya Masushima. He went on to make 17 appearances for the club in his debut preofessional season. In 2018, Nagato appeared in 29 games but only started 13 of those, struggling to hold down a place in the team. Manager Susumu Watanabe mainly played with a back three, with more attacking players Kunimitsu Sekiguchi and Yoshihiro Nakano often preferred on the left-hand side. Vegalta Sendai made it to the final of the 2018 Emperor's Cup, losing 1-0 in the final to Urawa Red Diamonds where Nagano was an unused substitute. He made two appearances in the competition.

Throughout the 2019 season, Nagato played in almost every game for Vegalta. Manager Watanabe initially deployed him as the left-sided centre back in his preferred back three, but he moved back to his favoured left-back position when a back four was introduced later in the season. He also scored his first goal for the club in a 2-1 league win over Gamba Osaka, with a deflected shot from outside of the box. Nagato impressed as a goal provider, especially from corners, racking up 10 league assists which was second only to Teruhito Nakagawa of Yokohama F. Marinos. Vegalta finished in 11th position in the league, exactly the same as in the 2018 season.

In 2020, Nagato left Vegalta Sendai to join Kashima Antlers, taking the number 14 shirt. Nagato made his first appearance in a continental competition in January, playing in the AFC Champions League qualifying play-offs, where Kashima fell to a 1-0 defeat to Melbourne Victory. The game was also his debut for Kashima, but he missed a penalty in the defeat. He made 22 appearances in his first season in Kashima, despite missing a number of games at the end of the season after testing positive for COVID-19 in November 2020.

== Career statistics ==
As of 13 February 2024

Appearances and goals by club, season and competition
Club	Season	League			National Cup		League Cup		Continental		Other		Total	
Club	Season	Division	Apps	Goals	Apps	Goals	Apps	Goals	Apps	Goals	Apps	Goals	Apps	Goals
Japan			League		Emperor's Cup		J.League Cup		AFC		Other		Total	
Vegalta Sendai	2017	J1 League	17	0	0	0	3	0	–		0	0	20	0
Vegalta Sendai	2018	J1 League	29	0	3	0	5	0	–		0	0	37	0
Vegalta Sendai	2019	J1 League	30	2	1	0	3	0	–		0	0	34	2
Vegalta Sendai	Total		76	2	4	0	11	0	0	0	0	0	91	2
Kashima Antlers	2020	J1 League	22	0	0	0	2	0	1	0	0	0	25	0
Kashima Antlers	2021	J1 League	29	1	1	0	5	0	–		0	0	35	1
Kashima Antlers	Total		51	1	1	0	7	0	1	0	0	0	60	1
Yokohama F. Marinos	2022	J1 League	26	0	2	0	0	0	5	0	0	0	33	0
Yokohama F. Marinos	2023	J1 League	27	2	0	0	8	0	3	0	1 (Note: Appearance in the Japanese Super Cup)	0	39	2
Yokohama F. Marinos	Total		53	2	2	0	8	0	8	0	1	0	72	2
Career total			180	5	7	0	26	0	9	0	1	0	223	5

== Honours ==
=== Club ===
Vegalta Sendai

- Emperor's Cup: 2018 Runners-up

Yokohama F. Marinos

- J1 League: 2022
- Japanese Super Cup: 2023

Vissel Kobe

- J1 100 Year Vision League: 2026

=== Individual ===
- J.League Outstanding Player Award: 2022
