= 2019 Emperor's Cup =

Tournament details
- Country: Japan
- Dates: 25 May 2019 – 1 January 2020
- Teams: 88

Final positions
- Champions: Vissel Kobe (1st title)
- Runners-up: Kashima Antlers
- AFC Champions League: Vissel Kobe

Tournament statistics
- Matches played: 87
- Goals scored: 272 (3.13 per match)

The 2019 Emperor's Cup (Emperor's Cup JFA 99th Japan Football Championship (Japanese: 天皇杯 JFA 第99回全日本サッカー選手権大会)) was the 99th edition of the annual Japanese national football cup tournament. The tournament began on 25 May and ended with the final on 1 January 2020. The final was the first event held at the National Stadium after its rebuilding.

The defending champions were Urawa Red Diamonds, but they lost to Honda FC in the Round of 16.

Vissel Kobe won their first trophy after winning the final. As the winners, they automatically qualified to the group stage of the 2020 AFC Champions League.

== Calendar ==
Round	Date	Matches	Clubs	New entries this round
First round	25–26 May	24	47+1 → 24	47 prefectural cup winners; 1 Amateur Best Team
Second round	3–10 July	32	24+40 → 32	18 J1 clubs; 22 J2 clubs
Third round	14 August	16	32 → 16	
Fourth round	18–25 September	8	16 → 8	
Quarter-finals	23 October	4	8 → 4	
Semi-finals	21 December	2	4 → 2	
Final	1 January 2020	1	2 → 1	

== First round ==
The draw for the first three rounds was held on 4 April 2019.

26 May 2019 Match 1	Blaublitz Akita	0–3	Meiji University	Akita
13:00		Report	Morishita 30'; Ogashiwa 40'; Sato 79'	Stadium: Soyu Stadium

25 May 2019 Match 2	Honda Lock	5–1	FC Tokushima	Nobeoka
13:00	Yoshimura 8'; Mera 21', 48'; Sakamoto 45+2'; Tose 88'	Report	Nakamine 67'	Stadium: Nishishina Athletic Stadium

25 May 2019 Match 3	Tochigi City	0–2	Vanraure Hachinohe	Utsunomiya
13:00		Report	Nakamura 34'; Sudo 80'	Stadium: Tochigi Green Stadium

26 May 2019 Match 4	AC Nagano Parceiro	1–0	Niigata University HW	Nagano
13:00	Mikami 83'	Report		Stadium: Saku Athletic Stadium

25 May 2019 Match 5	Matsue City	2–2 (a.e.t.) (2–4 p)	Kamatamare Sanuki	Masuda
13:00	Sato 8'; Nakai 28'	Report	Watanabe 13'; Akahoshi 73'	Stadium: Shimane Football Field

26 May 2019 Match 6	Briobecca Urayasu	0–1	Hosei University	Chiba
13:00		Report	Takemoto 35'	Stadium: Fukuda Denshi Arena

25 May 2019 Match 7	Fukui United	2–4	Honda FC	Fukui
13:00	Yamada; Kanemura 37'	Report	Sasaki 58', 84'; Furuhashi 69'; Tono 90+2'	Stadium: Technoport Fukui Stadium

26 May 2019 Match 8	Veertien Mie	3–2 (a.e.t.)	Kwansei Gakuin University	Suzuka
13:00	Sakai 10'; Nishimura 23'; Shioya 92'	Report	Yamami 4'; Nakamura 64'	Stadium: Mie Suzuka Sports Garden

26 May 2019 Match 9	MD Nagasaki	0–1	Kochi United	Nagasaki
13:00		Report	Murakami 90+2'	Stadium: Kakidomori Park Ball Game Field

26 May 2019 Match 10	Hokkaido UE Iwamizawa	0–2	Ryutsu Keizai University	Sapporo
13:00		Report	Saito 71', 87'	Stadium: Sapporo Atsubetsu Park Stadium

26 May 2019 Match 11	Nara Club	1–2	Ritsumeikan University	Nara
13:00	Shimada 84'	Report	Tanaka 17'; Nobe 45+2'	Stadium: Naraden Field

25 May 2019 Match 12	Iwaki FC	2–3	Sendai University	Fukushima
13:00	Kim Te-seng 15'; Own goal 55' (o.g.)	Report	Hitomi 49'; Saga 58'; Iwabuchi 82'	Stadium: Toho Stadium

26 May 2019 Match 13	Matsuyama University	0–2	Okinawa SV	Imabari
13:00		Report	Takahara 6'; Yamauchi 80'	Stadium: Arigato Service Dream Stadium

26 May 2019 Match 14	SRC Hiroshima	1–2	NIFS Kanoya	Hiroshima
13:00	Own goal 30' (o.g.)	Report	Kihashi 7'; Koyahara 90+6'	Stadium: Coca-Cola Bottlers Japan Hiroshima Stadium

26 May 2019 Match 15	Gainare Tottori	2–2 (a.e.t.) (4–3 p)	International Pacific University	Tottori
13:00	Vitor Gabriel 15', 45'	Report	Akagi 53', 56'	Stadium: Tottori Bank Bird Stadium

25 May 2019 Match 16	Arterivo Wakayama	3–0	Saga LIXIL	Wakayama
13:00	Yasukawa 20'; Miyashita 82', 88'	Report		Stadium: Kimiidera Athletic Stadium

26 May 2019 Match 17	Giravanz Kitakyushu	6–0	Tokuyama University	Kitakyushu
13:00	Fukumori 19', 42', 73'; Machino 42', 45'; Ikemoto 90+3'	Report		Stadium: Mikuni World Stadium Kitakyushu

25 May 2019 Match 18	Thespakusatsu Gunma	1–0 (a.e.t.)	Tokyo International University	Maebashi
13:00	Takazawa 116'	Report		Stadium: Earth Care Gunma Shikishima Football Stadium

26 May 2019 Match 19	Gifu Kyoritsu University	2–4	Hokuriku University	Gifu
13:00	Yokoyama 73'; Tanaka 82'	Report	Nagashima 7', 18', 65'; Higashide 61'	Stadium: Gifu Nagaragawa Meadow

26 May 2019 Match 20	Roasso Kumamoto	2–0	Verspah Oita	Kumamoto
13:00	Takase 57'; Kotani 76'	Report		Stadium: Egao Kenko Stadium

26 May 2019 Match 21	Iwate Grulla Morioka	1–0	Yamanashi Gakuin University Pegasus	Morioka
13:00	Taniguchi 66'	Report		Stadium: Iwagin Stadium

25 May 2019 Match 22	Toin University of Yokohama	8–0	Yamagata University Faculty of Medicine	Hiratsuka
13:00	Shimomura 17'; Iwashita 42'; Sugiyama 43'; Yamada 60', 72', 90+2'; Matsumoto 66'; Issaka 71'	Report		Stadium: Shonan BMW Stadium Hiratsuka

25 May 2019 Match 23	MIO Biwako Shiga	0–2	FC Osaka	Higashiomi
13:00		Report	Kawanishi 77'; Sunomata 86'	Stadium: Nunobiki Green Stadium

26 May 2019 Match 24	Kataller Toyama	2–0	FC Kariya	Takaoka
13:00	Lucas Daubermann 30'; Tanaka 78'	Report		Stadium: Takaoka Sports Core

== Second round ==
3 July 2019 Match 25	Kawasaki Frontale	1–0	Meiji University	Kawasaki
19:00	Own goal 15'	Report		Stadium: Todoroki Athletics Stadium

3 July 2019 Match 26	JEF United Chiba	0–3	Fagiano Okayama	Chiba
19:00		Report	Masuda 45+2'; Fukumoto 70'; Takeda 90+5'	Stadium: Fukuda Denshi Arena

3 July 2019 Match 27	Júbilo Iwata	5–2	Honda Lock	Iwata
19:00	Nakayama 27', 54', 90+4'; Moriya 61'; Morishita 64'	Report	Tamiya 39'; Ando 59'	Stadium: Yamaha Stadium

3 July 2019 Match 28	Matsumoto Yamaga	2–3 (a.e.t.)	Vanraure Hachinohe	Matsumoto
19:00	Iida 24'; Tanaka 93'	Report	Nakamura 89'; Niiyama 97'; Kokubun 119'	Stadium: Matsumoto Stadium

3 July 2019 Match 29	Shimizu S-Pulse	1–0	AC Nagano Parceiro	Shizuoka
19:00	Kawai 90+2'	Report		Stadium: IAI Stadium Nihondaira

3 July 2019 Match 30	Avispa Fukuoka	2–1 (a.e.t.)	Kagoshima United	Fukuoka
19:00	Maekawa 44'; Kido 102'	Report	Nagahata 35'	Stadium: Level5 Stadium

3 July 2019 Match 31	Gamba Osaka	7–1	Kamatamare Sanuki	Suita
19:00	Nakamura 10', 14', 79'; Meshino 24'; Takagi 75', 82'; Ademilson 90+4'	Report	Arabori 40'	Stadium: Panasonic Stadium Suita

10 July 2019 Match 32	Tokyo Verdy	0–2	Hosei University	Kita
18:30		Report	Matsuzawa 57'; Matsumoto 79'	Stadium: Ajinomoto Field Nishigaoka

3 July 2019 Match 33	Hokkaido Consadole Sapporo	2–4	Honda FC	Sapporo
19:00	Nakamura 33'; Fujimura 55'	Report	Tono 13', 31'; Furuhashi 65'; Ikematsu 86'	Stadium: Sapporo Atsubetsu Stadium

3 July 2019 Match 34	Tokushima Vortis	0–0 (a.e.t.) (5–3 p)	Ehime FC	Naruto
19:00		Report		Stadium: Pocarisweat Stadium

3 July 2019 Match 35	Shonan Bellmare	0–4	Veertien Mie	Shonan
19:00		Report	Sakai 22', 50', 58'; Kitano 71'	Stadium: Shonan BMW Stadium Hiratsuka

3 July 2019 Match 36	V-Varen Nagasaki	2–1 (a.e.t.)	Kochi United	Isahaya
19:00	Nagura 50'; Kono 120'	Report	Nishimura 89'	Stadium: Transcosmos Stadium Nagasaki

3 July 2019 Match 37	Urawa Red Diamonds	2–1	Ryutsu Keizai University	Saitama
19:00	Suzuki 2'; Ewerton 74'	Report	Kikuchi 19'	Stadium: Urawa Komaba Stadium

3 July 2019 Match 38	Mito HollyHock	1–0	Kyoto Sanga	Mito
19:00	Murata 90+2'	Report		Stadium: K's denki Stadium Mito

3 July 2019 Match 39	Yokohama F. Marinos	2–1	Ritsumeikan University	Yokohama
19:00	Amano 42'; Shinozuka 80'	Report	Tanaka 51'	Stadium: NHK Spring Mitsuzawa Football Stadium

10 July 2019 Match 40	Yokohama FC	2–1	Sendai University	Yokohama
19:00	Matsui 75'; Toshima 81'	Report	Fujioka 48'	Stadium: NHK Spring Mitsuzawa Football Stadium

3 July 2019 Match 41	Sanfrecce Hiroshima	4–0	Okinawa SV	Fukuyama
18:30	Higashi 47'; Matsumoto 81'; Patric 84', 90+1'	Report		Stadium: Fukuyama Takegahana Park Stadium

3 July 2019 Match 42	Zweigen Kanazawa	1–0	Albirex Niigata	Kanazawa
19:00	Sugiura 59'	Report		Stadium: Ishikawa West Green Park Stadium

3 July 2019 Match 43	Nagoya Grampus	0–3	NIFS Kanoya	Nagoya
19:00		Report	Ito 46'; Nemoto 67'; Fujimoto 81'	Stadium: Paloma Mizuho Stadium

3 July 2019 Match 44	Oita Trinita	4–1	Gainare Tottori	Oita
19:00	Mitsuhira 30', 69'; Tone 37'; Goto 90+3'	Report	Vitor Gabriel 82'	Stadium: Oita Bank Dome

10 July 2019 Match 45	Cerezo Osaka	3–1 (a.e.t.)	Arterivo Wakayama	Osaka
19:00	Takagi 38'; Yamashita 98'; Ando 120'	Report	Hayashi 52'	Stadium: Yanmar Stadium Nagai

3 July 2019 Match 46	Renofa Yamaguchi	2–1	FC Ryukyu	Yamaguchi
19:00	Kudo 25'; Yamashita 73'	Report	Uejo 15'	Stadium: Ishin Me-Life Stadium

3 July 2019 Match 47	Vissel Kobe	4–0	Giravanz Kitakyushu	Kobe
19:00	Yasui 44'; Ogawa 56'; Tanaka 64'; Samper 80'	Report		Stadium: Noevir Stadium Kobe

3 July 2019 Match 48	Omiya Ardija	2–1 (a.e.t.)	Thespakusatsu Gunma	Saitama
19:00	Omae 10'; Takayama 118'	Report	Fukuda 71'	Stadium: NACK5 Stadium

3 July 2019 Match 49	Kashima Antlers	3–1	Hokuriku University	Kashima
19:00	Serginho 4'; Yamaguchi 10'; Kanamori 14'	Report	Takahashi 71'	Stadium: Kashima Soccer Stadium

3 July 2019 Match 50	Montedio Yamagata	1–2	Tochigi SC	Tendo
19:00	Kitagawa 39'	Report	Sakaki 2'; Hiraoka 78'	Stadium: ND Soft Stadium Yamagata

3 July 2019 Match 51	Sagan Tosu	1–1 (a.e.t.) (4–3 p)	Roasso Kumamoto	Tosu
19:00	Ibarbo 66'	Report	Murakami 62'	Stadium: Ekimae Real Estate Stadium

3 July 2019 Match 52	Kashiwa Reysol	4–0	Iwate Grulla Morioka	Kashiwa
19:00	Tezuka 23'; Esaka 66', 75'; Hosoya 87'	Report		Stadium: Sankyo Frontier Kashiwa Stadium

3 July 2019 Match 53	FC Tokyo	1–0	Toin University of Yokohama	Chofu
19:00	Uchida 50'	Report		Stadium: Ajinomoto Stadium

3 July 2019 Match 54	Ventforet Kofu	2–2 (a.e.t.) (4–2 p)	FC Gifu	Kofu
19:00	Ota 6'; Koyanagi 67'	Report	Fujitani 51', 90+3'	Stadium: Yamanashi Chuo Bank Stadium

3 July 2019 Match 55	Vegalta Sendai	4–1	FC Osaka	Sendai
19:00	Ramon Lopes 11', 73'; Ishihara 47', 76'	Report	Kitsui 44'	Stadium: Yurtec Stadium Sendai

3 July 2019 Match 56	Machida Zelvia	0–1	Kataller Toyama	Machida
19:00		Report	Sasaki 22'	Stadium: Machida Athletic Stadium

== Third round ==
14 August 2019 Match 57	Kawasaki Frontale	2–1 (a.e.t.)	Fagiano Okayama	Okayama
19:00	Leandro Damião 90+3'; Ienaga 117'	Report	Nakano 46'	Stadium: City Light Stadium

14 August 2019 Match 58	Júbilo Iwata	6–0	Vanraure Hachinohe	Iwata
19:00	Araki 16'; Nakayama 27', 58', 67'; Adaílton 72', 86'	Report		Stadium: Yamaha Stadium

14 August 2019 Match 59	Shimizu S-Pulse	1–0	Avispa Fukuoka	Fukuoka
19:00	Kusukami 25'	Report		Stadium: Level5 Stadium

14 August 2019 Match 60	Gamba Osaka	0–2	Hosei University	Kita
18:30		Report	Onishi 24'; Morioka 70'	Stadium: Ajinomoto Field Nishigaoka

14 August 2019 Match 61	Honda FC	2–0	Tokushima Vortis	Naruto
19:00	Omachi 37'; Tono 63'	Report		Stadium: Pocarisweat Stadium

14 August 2019 Match 62	Veertien Mie	2–2 (a.e.t.) (4–5 p)	V-Varen Nagasaki	Isahaya
19:00	Shioya 43'; Hiranobu 45+2'	Report	Niizato 21'; Lee Jong-ho 29'	Stadium: Transcosmos Stadium Nagasaki
	Penalties
	Fujimaki (penalty scored); Haraguchi (penalty scored); Hiranobu (penalty missed); Nogaito (penalty scored); Morinushi (penalty scored)		(penalty scored) Kurogi; (penalty scored) Otake; (penalty scored) Yoshioka; (penalty scored) Kamekawa; (penalty scored) Shimada

14 August 2019 Match 63	Urawa Red Diamonds	2–1	Mito HollyHock	Mito
19:00	Fabrício 65', 81'	Report	Jô 53'	Stadium: K's denki Stadium Mito

14 August 2019 Match 64	Yokohama F. Marinos	2–1	Yokohama FC	Yokohama
19:00	Nakagawa 21'; Otsu 45+1'	Report	Saito 65'	Stadium: NHK Spring Mitsuzawa Football Stadium

14 August 2019 Match 65	Sanfrecce Hiroshima	2–1	Zweigen Kanazawa	Hiroshima
19:00	Higashi 59'; Watari 74'	Report	Kaneko 27'	Stadium: Edion Stadium Hiroshima

14 August 2019 Match 66	NIFS Kanoya	1–2 (a.e.t.)	Oita Trinita	Oita
19:00	Own goal 90+3'	Report	Hoshi 90+1'; Ito 120'	Stadium: Oita Bank Dome

14 August 2019 Match 67	Cerezo Osaka	3–0	Renofa Yamaguchi	Yamaguchi
19:00	Sawakami 28', 60'; Souza 31'	Report		Stadium: Ishin Me-Life Stadium

14 August 2019 Match 68	Vissel Kobe	4–0	Omiya Ardija	Saitama
19:00	Tanaka 20', 48'; Fujimoto 54'; Ogawa 68'	Report		Stadium: NACK5 Stadium

14 August 2019 Match 69	Kashima Antlers	4–0	Tochigi SC	Utsunomiya
19:00	Oda 37'; Ito 45+2'; Leandro 55'; Arima 88'	Report		Stadium: Tochigi Green Stadium

14 August 2019 Match 70	Sagan Tosu	1–0 (a.e.t.)	Kashiwa Reysol	Kashiwa
19:00	Fernando Torres 96'	Report		Stadium: Sankyo Frontier Kashiwa Stadium

14 August 2019 Match 71	FC Tokyo	0–1	Ventforet Kofu	Kofu
19:00		Report	Mori 56'	Stadium: Yamanashi Chuo Bank Stadium

14 August 2019 Match 72	Vegalta Sendai	1–0	Kataller Toyama	Toyama
18:30	Germain 73'	Report		Stadium: Toyama Stadium

== Fourth round ==
The draw for the Fourth Round to the final was held on 16 August 2019. There was no seeding in the draw, however, the draw took into consideration the teams whose home or away in the round of 16 were predetermined:

- Kashima Antlers and Urawa Red Diamonds, who were to play the round of 16 home due to the participations in 2019 AFC Champions League quarter-finals, could not be drawn in the same tie.
- Yokohama F. Marinos, Honda FC and Hosei University, who were to play the round of 16 away since they could not provide stadiums on the designated match day, could not be drawn in the same tie each other.

The round of 16 matches were played on 18 September 2019, except for the matches involving Kashima Antlers and Urawa Red Diamonds, which were delayed as they were playing in the second leg of the 2019 AFC Champions League quarter-finals.

18 September 2019 Match 73	Vissel Kobe	3–2	Kawasaki Frontale	Kobe
19:00	Yamaguchi 38'; Furuhashi 45+3'; Ogawa 63'	Report	Kobayashi 70'; Kurumaya 85'	Stadium: Kobe Universiade Memorial Stadium

18 September 2019 Match 74	Sanfrecce Hiroshima	1–1 (a.e.t.) (9–10 p)	Oita Trinita	Hiroshima
19:00	Rhayner 80'	Report	Ito 34'	Stadium: Edion Stadium Hiroshima
	Penalties
	Rhayner (penalty scored); Morishima (penalty scored); Kashiwa (penalty scored); Matsumoto (penalty scored); Aoyama (penalty scored); Kawabe (penalty scored); Sasaki (penalty scored); Araki (penalty scored); Nogami (penalty scored); Shibasaki (penalty missed)		(penalty scored) Goto; (penalty scored) Kobayashi; (penalty scored) Matsumoto; (penalty scored) Shimakawa; (penalty scored) Onaiwu; (penalty scored) Misao; (penalty scored) Hoshi; (penalty scored) Takayama; (penalty scored) Marutani; (penalty scored) Suzuki

18 September 2019 Match 75	Sagan Tosu	4–2	Cerezo Osaka	Tosu
19:00	Toyoda 20', 88'; An Yong-woo 51'; Kanazaki 81'	Report	Jonjić 48'; Kakitani 72'	Stadium: Ekimae Real Estate Stadium

18 September 2019 Match 76	Júbilo Iwata	1–1 (a.e.t.) (3–4 p)	Shimizu S-Pulse	Iwata
19:00	Matsumoto 64'	Report	Own goal 90+4' (o.g.)	Stadium: Yamaha Stadium
	Penalties
	Lukian (penalty scored); Araki (penalty missed); Fujita (penalty missed); Adaílton (penalty scored); Okubo (penalty scored)		(penalty missed) Renato Augusto; (penalty scored) Douglas; (penalty scored) Júnior Dutra; (penalty scored) Nishizawa; (penalty scored) Hwang Seok-ho

25 September 2019 Match 77	Kashima Antlers	4–1	Yokohama F. Marinos	Kashima
19:00	Nakamura 13', 30', 45+2'; Ito 77'	Report	Erik 22'	Stadium: Kashima Soccer Stadium

25 September 2019 Match 78	Urawa Red Diamonds	0–2	Honda FC	Saitama
19:00		Report	Tomita 83'; Harada 87'	Stadium: Saitama Stadium 2002

18 September 2019 Match 79	V-Varen Nagasaki	2–1	Vegalta Sendai	Isahaya
19:00	Hata 47'; Hasegawa 87'	Report	Ramon Lopes 86'	Stadium: Transcosmos Stadium Nagasaki

18 September 2019 Match 80	Ventforet Kofu	2–1 (a.e.t.)	Hosei University	Kōfu
19:00	Soneda 27'; Miyazaki 93'	Report	Mori 77'	Stadium: Yamanashi Chuo Bank Stadium

== Quarter-finals ==
23 October 2019 Match 81	Vissel Kobe	1–0	Oita Trinita	Kobe
19:00	Yamaguchi 56'	Report		Stadium: Noevir Stadium Kobe; Attendance: 8,484; Referee: Yuichi Nishimura

23 October 2019 Match 82	Sagan Tosu	0–1	Shimizu S-Pulse	Tosu
19:00		Report	Júnior Dutra 15'	Stadium: Ekimae Real Estate Stadium; Attendance: 5,664; Referee: Minoru Tojo

23 October 2019 Match 83	Kashima Antlers	1–0	Honda FC	Kashima
19:00	Doi 65'	Report		Stadium: Kashima Soccer Stadium; Attendance: 6,660; Referee: Hajime Matsuo

23 October 2019 Match 84	V-Varen Nagasaki	2–1	Ventforet Kofu	Isahaya
19:00	Yoshioka 7'; Niizato 14'	Report	Ota 82'	Stadium: Transcosmos Stadium Nagasaki; Attendance: 3,571; Referee: Yudai Yamamoto

== Semi-finals ==
21 December 2019 Match 85	Vissel Kobe	3–1	Shimizu S-Pulse	Kobe
14:05	Iniesta 13'; Tanaka 33'; Furuhashi 69'	Report	Junior Dutra 38'	Stadium: Noevir Stadium Kobe; Attendance: 22,341; Referee: Hiroyuki Kimura

21 December 2019 Match 86	Kashima Antlers	3–2	V-Varen Nagasaki	Kashima
16:05	Serginho 4'; Hata 37' (o.g.); Ito 73'	Report	Yoneda 37'; Sawada 76'	Stadium: Kashima Soccer Stadium; Attendance: 15,760; Referee: Minoru Tojo

== Final ==
The final was played on 1 January 2020 at the newly rebuilt National Stadium in Shinjuku.

1 January 2020 Match 87	Vissel Kobe	2–0	Kashima Antlers	Shinjuku
14:35	Inukai 18' (o.g.); Fujimoto 38'	Report		Stadium: National Stadium; Attendance: 57,597; Referee: Ryuji Sato
