= 2019 Kashima Antlers season =

Kashima Antlers
2019 season
- Chairman: Shigeru Ibata
- Manager: Go Oiwa
- Stadium: Kashima Soccer Stadium
- J1 League: 3rd
- Emperor's Cup: Runners-up
- J.League Cup: Semi-finals
- AFC Champions League: Quarter-finals
- Top goalscorer: League: Serginho (12); All: Serginho (20)
- Highest home attendance: 34,312 (30 Nov 2019 v Vissel Kobe, J1 League round 33)
- Lowest home attendance: 2,742 (3 Jul 2019 v Hokuriku University, Emperor's Cup 2nd Round)
- Average home league attendance: 20,571
Home colours	Away colours	Third colours

The 2019 Kashima Antlers season involved the team competing in the J1 League, they finished 3rd in the 2018 J1 League. They also competed in the J.League Cup, Emperor's Cup, and AFC Champions League.

== Squad ==
As of 16 February 2019.

Note: Flags indicate national team as defined under FIFA eligibility rules; some limited exceptions apply. Players may hold more than one non-FIFA nationality.

No.	Pos.	Nation	Player
1	GK	KOR	Kwoun Sun-tae
2	DF	JPN	Atsuto Uchida
4	MF	BRA	Léo Silva
5	DF	KOR	Jung Seung-hyun
6	MF	JPN	Ryota Nagaki
8	MF	JPN	Shoma Doi
9	FW	JPN	Yuma Suzuki
10	FW	JPN	Hiroki Abe
11	MF	BRA	Leandro
13	MF	JPN	Atsutaka Nakamura
14	FW	JPN	Takeshi Kanamori
15	FW	JPN	Sho Ito
16	DF	JPN	Shuto Yamamoto
17	MF	JPN	Taiki Hirato
18	MF	BRA	Serginho
19	FW	JPN	Kazuma Yamaguchi
20	MF	JPN	Kento Misao

No.	Pos.	Nation	Player
21	GK	JPN	Hitoshi Sogahata
22	DF	JPN	Koki Anzai
23	DF	JPN	Itsuki Oda
24	DF	JPN	Yukitoshi Ito
25	MF	JPN	Yasushi Endo
27	DF	BRA	Bueno
28	DF	JPN	Koki Machida
29	GK	JPN	Shinichiro Kawamata
30	MF	JPN	Shintaro Nago
31	GK	JPN	Yuya Oki
33	DF	JPN	Ikuma Sekigawa
34	MF	JPN	Kotaro Arima
35	DF	JPN	Shogo Sasaki
38	GK	JPN	Taiki Yamada
39	DF	JPN	Tomoya Inukai
41	MF	JPN	Ryōhei Shirasaki
—	FW	JPN	Ayase Ueda (special designated player)

== Competitions ==
=== J1 League ===
==== League table ====
Pos	Team	Pld	W	D	L	GF	GA	GD	Pts	Qualification or relegation
1	Yokohama F. Marinos (C)	34	22	4	8	68	38	+30	70	Qualification for the Champions League group stage
2	FC Tokyo	34	19	7	8	46	29	+17	64	Qualification for the Champions League play-off round
3	Kashima Antlers	34	18	9	7	54	30	+24	63	Qualification for the Champions League play-off round
4	Kawasaki Frontale	34	16	12	6	57	34	+23	60	
5	Cerezo Osaka	34	18	5	11	39	25	+14	59	

Source: Meiji Yasuda J1 League
Rules for classification: 1) Points; 2) Goal difference; 3) Goals scored.
(C) Champions

==== Results ====
23 February 2019 1	Kashima Antlers	1–2	Oita Trinita	Kashima
15:03 JST	Ito 48'	Report	Fujimoto 18', 69'; Maeda (yellow card) 64'	Stadium: Kashima Soccer Stadium; Attendance: 19,463; Referee: Hajime Matsuo

1 March 2019 2	Kawasaki Frontale	1–1	Kashima Antlers	Kawasaki
19:03 JST	Nakamura 9'; Oshima (yellow card) 66'	Report	Ito 21'; Anzai (yellow card) 38'; Abe (yellow card) 67'	Stadium: Kawasaki Todoroki Stadium; Attendance: 23,927; Referee: Ryuji Sato

9 March 2019 3	Kashima Antlers	1–0	Shonan Bellmare	Kashima
16:03 JST	Leandro (yellow card) 52'; Anzai 58'; Kwoun (yellow card) 85'	Report	Okamoto (yellow card) 32' (yellow-red card) 45'; Ohno (yellow card) 42'	Stadium: Kashima Soccer Stadium; Attendance: 16,659; Referee: Futoshi Nakamura

17 March 2019 4	Hokkaido Consadole Sapporo	1 – 3	Kashima Antlers	Sapporo
13:00	Suzuki (yellow card) 82'; Anderson Lopes 85'	Report	Ito 12' 23'; Léo Silva (yellow card) 58'; Leandro 76'	Stadium: Sapporo Dome; Attendance: 23,002; Referee: (Japan) Jumpei Iida

30 March 2019 5	Júbilo Iwata	1 – 1	Kashima Antlers	Iwata
14:00	Takahashi (yellow card) 32'; Matsumoto 46'; Ogawa (yellow card) 90+4'	Report	Léo Silva (yellow card) 34' (goal) 83'	Stadium: Yamaha Stadium; Attendance: 13,111; Referee: (Japan) Koichiro Fukushima

5 April 2019 6	Kashima Antlers	2 – 1	Nagoya Grampus	Kashima
19:00	Doi 72'; Léo Silva 81'	Report	Gabriel Xavier 47'; Yonemoto (yellow card) 74'; Maruyama (yellow card) 77'; Mateus (yellow card) 90+7'	Stadium: Kashima Soccer Stadium; Attendance: 14,163; Referee: (Japan) Hiroyuki Kimura

14 April 2019 7	FC Tokyo	3 – 1	Kashima Antlers	Chōfu
14:00	Nagai 5'; Diego Oliveira 16' 29'	Report	Léo Silva 55'	Stadium: Ajinomoto Stadium; Attendance: 38,414; Referee: (Japan) Ryuji Sato

20 April 2019 8	Kashima Antlers	1 – 0	Vegalta Sendai	Kashima
15:00	Inukai 66'	Report	Yoshio (yellow card) 38'	Stadium: Kashima Soccer Stadium; Attendance: 16,844; Referee: (Japan) Yoshiro Imamura

28 April 2019 9	Yokohama F. Marinos	2 – 1	Kashima Antlers	Yokohama
13:00	Marcos Júnior (yellow card) 59' (goal) 82'; Nakagawa 69'	Report	Koki Anzai 11'	Stadium: Nissan Stadium; Attendance: 38,561; Referee: (Japan) Koichiro Fukushima

3 May 2019 10	Kashima Antlers	3 – 0	Shimizu S-Pulse	Kashima
15:00	Machida (yellow card) 1'; Doi 10'; Abe 69'; Koki Anzai 72'	Report	Musaka (yellow card) 17'; Tatsuta (yellow card) 65'; Elsinho (yellow card) 77'	Stadium: Kashima Soccer Stadium; Attendance: 31,182; Referee: (Japan) Jumpei Iida

12 May 2019 11	Vissel Kobe	0 – 1	Kashima Antlers	Kobe
14:00	Yamaguchi (yellow card) 86'	Report	Serginho 17'	Stadium: Noevir Stadium Kobe; Attendance: 20,119; Referee: (Japan) Yuichi Nishimura

18 May 2019 12	Kashima Antlers	5 – 0	Matsumoto Yamaga	Kashima
15:00	Léo Silva 25'; Shirasaki 47' 65'; Serginho 54'; Nakamura 83'	Report	Imai (yellow card) 60'	Stadium: Kashima Soccer Stadium; Attendance: 20,700; Referee: (Japan) Hiroyoshi Takayama

26 May 2019 13	Sagan Tosu	1 – 0	Kashima Antlers	Tosu
14:00	Isaac Cuenca (yellow card) 22'; Toyoda 90+4'	Report		Stadium: Ekimae Real Estate Stadium; Attendance: 14,130; Referee: (Japan) Hajime Matsuo

1 June 2019 14	Gamba Osaka	1 – 1	Kashima Antlers	Suita
19:00	Meshino 13'	Report	Jung Seung-hyun (yellow card) 27'; Serginho (yellow card) 30'; Doi 43'	Stadium: Panasonic Stadium Suita; Attendance: 30,495; Referee: (Japan) Takuto Okabe

14 June 2019 15	Kashima Antlers	2 – 0	Cerezo Osaka	Kashima
19:00	Serginho 50' (pen.); Shirasaki 72'; Leandro (yellow card) 83'	Report		Stadium: Kashima Soccer Stadium; Attendance: 10,208; Referee: (Japan) Yusuke Araki

30 June 2019 16	Kashima Antlers	2 – 2	Sanfrecce Hiroshima	Kashima
20:30	Araki 1' (o.g.); Misao (yellow card) 44'; Machida 74'	Report	Kashiwa 27' 90+4'; Douglas Vieira (yellow card) 44'; Sasaki (yellow card) 62'; Rhayner (yellow card) 76'; Patric (yellow card) 83'	Stadium: Kashima Soccer Stadium; Attendance: 13,502; Referee: (Japan) Minoru Tōjō

6 July 2019 17	Kashima Antlers	2 – 0	Júbilo Iwata	Kashima
19:00	Machida (yellow card) 26'; Shinzato 29' (o.g.); Koike 40'; Kwoun Sun-tae (yellow card) 75'	Report	Rodrigues (yellow card) 43'	Stadium: Kashima Soccer Stadium; Attendance: 17,442; Referee: (Japan) Yoshiro Imamura

13 July 2019 18	Vegalta Sendai	0 – 4	Kashima Antlers	Sendai
19:00		Report	Serginho 16' 45+1'; Kwoun Sun-tae (yellow card) 59'; Shirasaki 67'; Doi 75'; Nago (yellow card) 81'	Stadium: Yurtec Stadium Sendai; Attendance: 17,639; Referee: (Japan) Yudai Yamamoto

20 July 2019 19	Kashima Antlers	2 – 1	Sagan Tosu	Kashima
18:30	Leandro 20' (pen.) (yellow card) 55'; Shirasaki 35'; Inukai (yellow card) 42'; Nagaki (yellow card) 59'	Report	Takahashi (yellow card) 19' (yellow-red card) 90'; Kanazaki 23' (yellow card) 81'	Stadium: Kashima Soccer Stadium; Attendance: 25,173; Referee: (Japan) Massaki Iemoto

31 July 2019 20	Urawa Reds	1 – 1	Kashima Antlers	Saitama
19:30	Koroki 88'	Report	Ito 77'	Stadium: Saitama Stadium 2002; Attendance: 37,265; Referee: (Japan) Yuichi Nishimura

3 August 2019 21	Shonan Bellmare	3 – 2	Kashima Antlers	Hiratsuka
19:30	Yamasaki 49'; Noda 52'; Saka 90+6'	Report	Shirasaki (yellow card) 56'; Serginho 61'; Ito 73' (pen.)	Stadium: Shonan BMW Stadium Hiratsuka; Attendance: 14,237; Referee: (Japan) Akihiko Ikeuchi

10 August 2019 22	Kashima Antlers	2 – 1	Yokohama F. Marinos	Kashima
18:30	Serginho 1'; Kwoun Sun-tae (yellow card) 69'; Ueda 87'	Report	Ogihara (yellow card) 30' (yellow-red card) 76'; Nakagawa 68'	Stadium: Kashima Soccer Stadium; Attendance: 29,790; Referee: (Japan) Koei Koya

17 August 2019 23	Oita Trinita	0 – 1	Kashima Antlers	Ōita
19:00	Puangchan (yellow card) 29'; Misao (yellow card) 73'	Report	Yuki Soma 71'; Nagaki (yellow card) 90+2'	Stadium: Showa Denko Dome Oita; Attendance: 28,574; Referee: (Japan) Yudai Yamamoto

23 August 2019 24	Kashima Antlers	2 – 2	Gamba Osaka	Kashima
19:00	Serginho 44'; Ito 58'; Kei Koizumi (yellow card) 72'; Misao (yellow card) 90+2'	Report	Ademilson 33'; Kurata (yellow card) 45+1'; Patric 73' (pen.)	Stadium: Kashima Soccer Stadium; Attendance: 16,063; Referee: (Japan) Nobutsugu Murakami

1 September 2019 25	Shimizu S-Pulse	0 – 4	Kashima Antlers	Shizuoka
18:00	Kazunori Yoshimoto (yellow card) 52'; Junior Dutra (yellow card) 60'	Report	Endo 15'; Serginho 34' (pen.); Ueda 73' 90+3'	Stadium: IAI Stadium Nihondaira; Attendance: 15,480; Referee: (Japan) Yuichi Nishimura

14 September 2019 26	Kashima Antlers	2 – 0	FC Tokyo	Kashima
19:00	Bueno 2'; Misao (yellow card) 28'; Serginho 78'	Report	Muroya (yellow card) 57'	Stadium: Kashima Soccer Stadium; Attendance: 27,285; Referee: (Japan) Minoru Tōjō

28 September 2019 27	Kashima Antlers	1 – 1	Hokkaido Consadole Sapporo	Kashima
15:00	Serginho 50'	Report	Shindo 11'; Miyazawa (yellow card) 56'	Stadium: Kashima Soccer Stadium; Attendance: 19,314; Referee: (Japan) Koei Koya

6 October 2019 28	Cerezo Osaka	0 – 1	Kashima Antlers	Osaka
15:00	Kimoto (yellow card) 75'	Report	Inukai 6'; Bueno (yellow card) 82'	Stadium: Yanmar Stadium Nagai; Attendance: 23,001; Referee: (Japan) Nobutsugu Murakami

18 October 2019 29	Matsumoto Yamaga	1 – 1	Kashima Antlers	Matsumoto
19:00	Nagai 9'	Report	Endo (yellow card) 16'; Bueno (yellow card) 53'; Ueda 58' (pen.)	Stadium: Sunpro Alwin; Attendance: 19,479; Referee: (Japan) Yudai Yamamoto

1 November 2019 30	Kashima Antlers	1 – 0	Urawa Reds	Kashima
18:00	Serginho 72'; Kwoun Sun-tae (yellow card) 90+4'	Report	Sugimoto (yellow card) 62'	Stadium: Kashima Soccer Stadium; Attendance: 14,439; Referee: (Japan) Yusuke Araki

9 November 2019 31	Kashima Antlers	0 – 2	Kawasaki Frontale	Kashima
14:00	Bueno (yellow card) 63'; Jung (yellow card) 83'	Report	Morita (yellow card) 42'; Yamamura 62'; Taniguchi (yellow card) 69'; Hasegawa 71'; Ienaga (yellow card) 77'	Stadium: Kashima Soccer Stadium; Attendance: 23,195; Referee: Jumpei Iida

23 November 2019 32	Sanfrecce Hiroshima	0 – 0	Kashima Antlers	Hiroshima
13:00	Pereira (yellow card) 22'	Report	Bueno (yellow card) 45+2'; Misao (yellow card) 72'; Silva (yellow card) 90+5'	Stadium: Edion Stadium Hiroshima; Attendance: 17,033; Referee: Hiroyuki Kimura

30 November 2019 33	Kashima Antlers	1 – 3	Vissel Kobe	Kashima
14:00	Doi 40'; Inukai (yellow card) 86'	Report	Fujimoto 14'; Goke 29'; Ogawa 88'	Stadium: Kashima Soccer Stadium; Attendance: 34,312; Referee: Nobutsugu Murakami

7 December 2019 34	Nagoya Grampus	0 – 1	Kashima Antlers	Toyota
14:00	Ito (yellow card) 89'	Report	Machida (yellow card) 38'; Nakatani 43' (o.g.)	Stadium: Toyota Stadium; Attendance: 33,133; Referee: Hajime Matsuo

=== J.League Cup ===
==== Results ====
4 September 2019 Quarter-final first leg	Urawa Reds	2–3	Kashima Antlers	Saitama
19:30	Koroki 58'; Makino 60'; Sekine (yellow card) 67'	Report	Bueno 35'; Doi 38' (yellow card) 83'; Nago 43'	Stadium: Saitama Stadium 2002; Attendance: 21,148; Referee: (Japan) Hiroyuki Kimura

8 September 2019 Quarter-final second Leg	Kashima Antlers	2–2 (5–4 agg.)	Urawa Reds	Kashima
18:30	Inukai 66'; Kei Koizumi (yellow card) 68'; Ito 87' (yellow card) 90+7'; Jung Seung-hyun (yellow card) 90+3'	Report	Ewerton 28'; Sekine 77'	Stadium: Kashima Soccer Stadium; Attendance: 14,887; Referee: (Japan) Ryuji Sato

9 October 2019 Semi-final first Leg	Kawasaki Frontale	3–1	Kashima Antlers	Kawasaki
19:00	Mawatari (yellow card) 9'; Hasegawa (yellow card) 16'; Morita 27'; Wakizaka 82'; Abe 85'	Report	Shirasaki 10'; Leandro (yellow card) 44'	Stadium: Kawasaki Todoroki Stadium; Attendance: 18,412; Referee: (Japan) Yuichi Nishimura

13 October 2019 Semi-final second leg	Kashima Antlers	0–0 (1–3 agg.)	Kawasaki Frontale	Kashima
19:00	Koike (yellow card) 27'; Jung Seung-hyun (yellow card) 45+1'	Report		Stadium: Kashima Soccer Stadium; Attendance: 19,127; Referee: (Japan) Minoru Tōjō

=== Emperor's Cup ===
3 July 2019 Second round	Kashima Antlers	3–1	Hokuriku University	Kashima
19:00	Serginho 4'; Yamaguchi 10'; Kanamori 14'	Report	Takahashi 71'	Stadium: Kashima Soccer Stadium; Attendance: 2,742; Referee: Hiroyuki Kimura

14 August 2019 Third round	Kashima Antlers	4–0	Tochigi SC	Utsunomiya
19:00	Oda 37'; Ito 45+2'; Leandro 55'; Arima 88'	Report		Stadium: Tochigi Green Stadium; Attendance: 10,169; Referee: Ryosuke Yamaoka

25 September 2019 Round of 16	Kashima Antlers	4–1	Yokohama F. Marinos	Kashima
19:00	Nakamura 13', 30', 45+2'; Ito (yellow card) 27'; Bueno (yellow card) 67'; Ito 77'	Report	Ito (yellow card) 16'; Erik 23'; Ōtsu (yellow card) 85'	Stadium: Kashima Soccer Stadium; Attendance: 6,529; Referee: (Japan) Takuto Okabe

23 October 2019 Quarter-finals	Kashima Antlers	1–0	Honda	Kashima
19:00	Machida (yellow card) 38'; Doi 65'	Report	Harada (yellow card) 78'	Stadium: Kashima Soccer Stadium; Attendance: 6,660; Referee: (Japan) Hajime Matsuo

21 December 2019 Semi-finals	Kashima Antlers	3–2	V-Varen Nagasaki	Kashima
15:05	Serginho 4'; Hata 23' (o.g.); Ito 73'	Report	César (yellow card) 36'; Yoneda 37'; Sawada 76'	Stadium: Kashima Soccer Stadium; Attendance: 15,760; Referee: Minoru Tojo

1 January 2020 Final	Vissel Kobe	2–0	Kashima Antlers	Tokyo
14:35	Inukai 18' (o.g.); Fujimoto 38'; Dankler (yellow card) 57'	Report	Silva (yellow card) 77'	Stadium: Japan National Stadium; Attendance: 57,597; Referee: Ryuji Sato

=== AFC Champions League ===
==== Group standings ====
Pos	Team	Pld	W	D	L	GF	GA	GD	Pts	Qualification	SDL	KAS	GYE	JDT
1	(China) Shandong Luneng	6	3	2	1	10	8	+2	11	Advance to knockout stage	—	2–2	2–1	2–1
2	(Japan) Kashima Antlers	6	3	1	2	9	8	+1	10	Advance to knockout stage	2–1	—	0–1	2–1
3	(South Korea) Gyeongnam FC	6	2	2	2	9	8	+1	8		2–2	2–3	—	2–0
4	(Malaysia) Johor Darul Ta'zim	6	1	1	4	4	8	−4	4		0–1	1–0	1–1	—

Source: AFC
Rules for classification: Group stage tiebreakers

==== Results ====
5 March 2019 Group E	Kashima Antlers (Japan)	2–1	(Malaysia) Johor Darul Ta'zim	Kashima
19:00 UTC+9	Hirato 43'; Serginho 56'	Live Report; Stats Report	Diogo 80'	Stadium: Kashima Soccer Stadium; Attendance: 6,425; Referee: Turki Al-Khudhayr (Saudi Arabia)

12 March 2019 Group E	Shandong Luneng (China)	2–2	(Japan) Kashima Antlers	Jinan Olympic Sports Center Stadium, Jinan
15:30 UTC+8	Pellè 20' (pen.), 41'	Live Report; Stats Report	Ito 10', 14'	Attendance: 12,185; Referee: Mooud Bonyadifar (Iran)

9 April 2019 Group E	Gyeongnam FC (South Korea)	2–3	(Japan) Kashima Antlers	Changwon Football Center, Changwon
18:30 UTC+9	Choi Jae-soo (yellow card) 50'; Inukai 56' (o.g.); Mutch (yellow card) 62' (goal) 71'	Live Report; Stats Report	Inukai (yellow card) 40' (yellow-red card) 84'; Song Ju-Hun 75' (o.g.); Machida (yellow card) 80'; Kanamori 90+1'; Serginho 90+3'	Attendance: 2,194; Referee: Ahmed Al-Kaf (Oman)

24 April 2019 Group E	Kashima Antlers (Japan)	0–1	(South Korea) Gyeongnam FC	Kashima Soccer Stadium, Kashima
19:00 UTC+9	Koki Anzai (yellow card) 52'	Live Report; Stats Report	Mutch (yellow card) 25'; Ko Kyung-min (yellow card) 42'; Kunimoto 63'	Attendance: 7,193; Referee: Ali Sabah (Iraq)

8 May 2019 Group E	Johor Darul Ta'zim (Malaysia)	1–0	(Japan) Kashima Antlers	Larkin Stadium, Johor Bahru
20:45 UTC+8	Syafiq Ahmad 69'; Hazwan Bakri (yellow card) 87'; Safawi Rasid (yellow card) 90+3'; Gonzalo Cabrera (yellow card) 90+5'	Live Report; Stats Report	Koki Anzai (yellow card) 87'	Attendance: 4,860; Referee: Mohanad Qassim (Iraq)

22 May 2019 Group E	Kashima Antlers (Japan)	2–1	(China) Shandong Luneng	Kashima Soccer Stadium, Kashima
19:00 UTC+9	Ito 68' 70'	Live Report; Stats Report	Fellaini 11'; Qi Tianyu (yellow card) 16'	Attendance: 8,836; Referee: (Qatar) Khamis Mohamed Al Kuwari

==== Round of 16 ====
18 June 2019 Round of 16 first leg	Kashima Antlers (Japan)	1–0	(Japan) Sanfrecce Hiroshima	Kashima Soccer Stadium, Kashima
19:00	Serginho 24'	Report	Inagaki (yellow card) 82' (yellow-red card) 86'	Attendance: 13,179; Referee: (Uzbekistan) Aziz Asimov

25 June 2019 Round of 16 second leg	(Japan) Sanfrecce Hiroshima	3–2 (3–3 agg.)	Kashima Antlers (Japan)	Edion Stadium Hiroshima, Hiroshima
19:00	Araki (yellow card) 54'; Sasaki (yellow card) 65' (goal) 72'; Patric 66' 90+6' (pen.); Nakabayashi (red card) 74'; Douglas Vieira (yellow card) 80'; Kashiwa (yellow card) 82'	Report	Misao (yellow card) 27'; Doi 33' 89'; Nago (yellow card) 35'	Attendance: 4,279; Referee: (Iraq) Ali Sabah

==== Quarter-finals ====
28 August 2019 Quarter-final first Leg	(China) Guangzhou Evergrande Taobao	0–0	Kashima Antlers (Japan)	Tianhe Stadium, Guangzhou
21:00	Xu Xin (yellow card) 74'	Report	Jung Seung-hyun (yellow card) 63'	Attendance: 39,998; Referee: (Qatar) Abdulrahman Al-Jassim

18 September 2019 Quarter-final second Leg	Kashima Antlers (Japan)	1–1 (1–1 agg.)	(China) Guangzhou Evergrande Taobao	Kashima Soccer Stadium, Kashima
19:00	Nagaki (yellow card) 46'; Serginho 51'; Ueda (yellow card) 87'	Report	Huang Bowen (yellow card) 9'; Zheng Zhi (yellow card) 31'; Talisca (yellow card) 34' (goal) 40'; Yang Liyu (yellow card) 42'	Attendance: 13,835; Referee: (Oman) Ahmed Al-Kaf

== Statistics ==
=== Scorers ===
Rank	No.	Pos	Player	J1 League	Emperor's Cup	J.League Cup	AFC Champions League	Total
1	18	FW	(Brazil) Serginho	12	2	0	6	20
2	15	FW	(Japan) Sho Ito	7	3	1	5	16
3	8	MF	(Japan) Shoma Doi	5	1	1	2	9
4	41	MF	(Japan) Ryōhei Shirasaki	5	0	1	0	6
5	13	MF	(Japan) Atsutaka Nakamura	1	3	0	0	4
5	36	FW	(Japan) Ayase Ueda	4	0	0	0	4
5	11	FW	(Brazil) Leandro	3	1	0	0	4
5	4	MF	(Brazil) Léo Silva	4	0	0	0	4
9	22	DF	(Japan) Koki Anzai	3	0	0	0	3
9	39	DF	(Japan) Tomoya Inukai	2	0	1	0	3
11	14	FW	(Japan) Takeshi Kanamori	0	1	0	1	2
11	27	DF	(Brazil) Bueno	1	0	1	0	2
11	26	DF	(Japan) Yuta Koike	2	0	0	0	2
14	47	MF	(Japan) Yuki Soma	1	0	0	0	1
14	34	MF	(Japan) Kotaro Arima	0	1	0	0	1
14	23	DF	(Japan) Itsuki Oda	0	1	0	0	1
14	17	MF	(Japan) Taiki Hirato	0	0	0	1	1
14	19	FW	(Japan) Kazuma Yamaguchi	0	1	0	0	1
14	16	DF	(Japan) Shuto Yamamoto	0	0	0	1	1
14	10	FW	(Japan) Hiroki Abe	1	0	0	0	1
14	25	MF	(Japan) Yasushi Endo	1	0	0	0	1
14	30	MF	(Japan) Shintaro Nago	0	0	1	0	1
Subtotal				51	15	5	16	87
Own goals				3	0	1	1	5
Total				54	15	6	17	92

Last updated: 15 April 2021.
Source: Soccer DB

=== Clean sheets ===
Rank	No.	Player	J.League	Emperor's Cup	J.League Cup	AFC Champions League	Total
1	1	(South Korea) Kwoun Sun-tae	13	1	1	2	17
2	21	(Japan) Hitoshi Sogahata	2	1	0	0	3
Total			15	2	1	2	20

Last updated: 15 April 2021.
Source: Competitions
