= 2022 J.League Asia Challenge =

2022 Ｊリーグ アジアチャレンジ (in Japanese) เจลีก เอเชีย ชาเลนจ์ 2022 (in Thai)

Tournament details
- Host country: Thailand
- Dates: 12–15 November 2022
- Teams: 4 (from 1 confederation)
- Venues: 3 (in 3 host cities)

Tournament statistics
- Matches played: 3
- Goals scored: 17 (5.67 per match)
- Attendance: 40,613 (13,538 per match)
- Top scorer: 3 players with 1 goal each
- All statistics correct as of 16 November 2022.

The 2022 J.League Asia Challenge was the 4th edition of the referred friendly association football tournament, played from 12 to 15 November on Thailand in 2 different venues. Organized by the J.League, it is part of the J.LEAGUE Asian Strategy.

== Format ==
Two teams from J.League and two teams from Thai League 1 participated on the tournament, organized in a round-robin tournament format. Unordinarily, each Thai League 1 team will face only one J.League opponent in the tournament, while both of the two J.League teams will face only one Thai League opponent, alongside a match-up between both Japanese clubs. With the number of matches played when comparing the four teams being unproportional, no club was awarded a trophy, or deemed champions of the tournament.

== Main attractions ==
The main individual attractions to the Thai football supporters were two national team players, as they were able to watch both players live on their own clubs, having only seen them play for the National Team. They are two of the few Thai League 1 products that went to play on the J1 League. One of two players, the current Thai national team captain, Chanathip Songkrasin, played for 5 years on Thailand for Police Tero and Muangthong United before moving abroad to play on Japan. Firstly for Consadole Sapporo, then for Kawasaki Frontale. The other player is the attacking midfielder Supachok Sarachat, product of Buriram United, who also played on loan on Surin City before joining Chanathip's former club Consadole Sapporo in 2022.

== Squads ==
(Japan) Kawasaki Frontale
Manager: (Japan) Toru Oniki

Note: Flags indicate national team as defined under FIFA eligibility rules; some limited exceptions apply. Players may hold more than one non-FIFA nationality.

| No. | Pos. | Nation | Player |
|---|---|---|---|
| 1 | GK | KOR | Jung Sung-ryong |
| 2 | DF | JPN | Kyohei Noborizato |
| 4 | DF | BRA | Jesiel |
| 5 | DF | JPN | Shogo Taniguchi |
| 6 | MF | BRA | João Schmidt |
| 7 | DF | JPN | Shintaro Kurumaya |
| 8 | MF | JPN | Kento Tachibanada |
| 9 | FW | BRA | Leandro Damião |
| 10 | MF | JPN | Ryota Oshima |
| 11 | FW | JPN | Yu Kobayashi |
| 13 | DF | JPN | Miki Yamane |
| 14 | MF | JPN | Yasuto Wakizaka |
| 15 | DF | JPN | Asahi Sasaki |
| 16 | MF | JPN | Tatsuki Seko |
| 17 | MF | JPN | Kazuki Kozuka |
| 18 | MF | THA | Chanathip Songkrasin |

| No. | Pos. | Nation | Player |
|---|---|---|---|
| 19 | FW | JPN | Daiya Tono |
| 20 | FW | JPN | Kei Chinen |
| 21 | GK | JPN | Shunsuke Ando |
| 22 | GK | JPN | Yuki Hayasaka |
| 23 | MF | BRA | Marcinho |
| 24 | MF | JPN | Ten Miyagi |
| 25 | MF | JPN | Renji Matsui |
| 26 | FW | JPN | Takatora Einaga |
| 27 | GK | JPN | Kenta Tanno |
| 28 | FW | JPN | Taiyo Igarashi |
| 29 | DF | JPN | Kota Takai |
| 31 | DF | JPN | Kazuya Yamamura |
| 32 | FW | JPN | Shin Yamada |
| 33 | MF | JPN | Yuto Ozeki |
| 34 | DF | JPN | Yuto Matsunagane |
| 41 | MF | JPN | Akihiro Ienaga |

(Japan) Consadole Sapporo
Manager: (Serbia) Mihailo Petrovic

Note: Flags indicate national team as defined under FIFA eligibility rules; some limited exceptions apply. Players may hold more than one non-FIFA nationality.

| No. | Pos. | Nation | Player |
|---|---|---|---|
| 1 | GK | JPN | Takanori Sugeno |
| 2 | DF | JPN | Shunta Tanaka |
| 4 | MF | JPN | Daiki Suga |
| 5 | DF | JPN | Akito Fukumori |
| 6 | MF | JPN | Tomoki Takamine |
| 7 | MF | BRA | Lucas Fernandes |
| 8 | MF | JPN | Kazuki Fukai |
| 9 | MF | JPN | Takuro Kaneko |
| 10 | MF | JPN | Hiroki Miyazawa |
| 11 | MF | JPN | Ryota Aoki |
| 14 | MF | JPN | Yoshiaki Komai |
| 16 | MF | JPN | Ren Fujimura |
| 18 | MF | BRA | Gabriel Xavier |
| 19 | FW | JPN | Tsuyoshi Ogashiwa |
| 20 | DF | JPN | Daigo Nishi |
| 21 | GK | JPN | Shuhei Matsubara |
| 22 | GK | JPN | Koki Otani |
| 23 | FW | JPN | Shinzo Koroki |

| No. | Pos. | Nation | Player |
|---|---|---|---|
| 24 | DF | JPN | Toya Nakamura |
| 27 | MF | JPN | Takuma Arano |
| 29 | MF | JPN | Sora Igawa |
| 30 | MF | JPN | Hiromu Tanaka |
| 32 | FW | SLO | Milan Tučić |
| 33 | FW | BRA | Douglas |
| 34 | GK | JPN | Kojiro Nakano |
| 37 | FW | KOR | Kim Gun-hee |
| 40 | MF | JPN | Sota Sasaki |
| 41 | FW | JPN | Kenta Urushidate |
| 42 | GK | JPN | Amin Benmamoun |
| 44 | MF | JPN | Shinji Ono |
| 45 | FW | JPN | Taika Nakashima |
| 47 | DF | JPN | Shota Nishino |
| 49 | MF | THA | Supachok Sarachat |
| 50 | DF | JPN | Daihachi Okamura |
| — | DF | JPN | Takahiro Yanagi |

(Thailand) Buriram United
Manager: (Japan) Masatada Ishii

Note: Flags indicate national team as defined under FIFA eligibility rules; some limited exceptions apply. Players may hold more than one non-FIFA nationality.

| No. | Pos. | Nation | Player |
|---|---|---|---|
| 1 | GK | THA | Siwarak Tedsungnoen |
| 2 | DF | THA | Sasalak Haiprakhon |
| 3 | DF | THA | Pansa Hemviboon |
| 5 | DF | THA | Theerathon Bunmathan |
| 6 | MF | THA | Peeradon Chamratsamee |
| 7 | FW | KEN | Ayub Masika |
| 8 | MF | THA | Ratthanakorn Maikami |
| 9 | FW | THA | Supachai Chaided |
| 10 | FW | COL | Frank Castañeda |
| 11 | MF | THA | Chutipol Thongthae |
| 14 | DF | THA | Chitipat Tanklang |
| 15 | DF | THA | Narubadin Weerawatnodom |
| 20 | MF | SRB | Goran Čaušić |
| 21 | FW | THA | Suphanat Mueanta |
| 22 | DF | IRQ | Rebin Sulaka |
| 26 | FW | GUI | Lonsana Doumbouya |

| No. | Pos. | Nation | Player |
|---|---|---|---|
| 29 | FW | THA | Arthit Boodjinda |
| 30 | DF | THA | Maxx Creevey |
| 44 | DF | PHI | Diego Bardanca |
| 58 | FW | THA | Pattara Soimalai |
| 59 | GK | THA | Nopphon Lakhonphon |
| 62 | MF | THA | Airfan Doloh |
| 64 | MF | THA | Thirapak Prueangna |
| 67 | MF | THA | Thanadol Kaosaart |
| 75 | GK | THA | Phumeworapol Wannabutr |
| 77 | FW | MYA | Aung Thu |
| 82 | DF | THA | Thanison Paibulkijcharoen |
| 89 | DF | THA | Pongsakron Hanrattana |
| 92 | DF | THA | Tawatchai Inprakone |
| 95 | MF | THA | Seksan Ratree |
| 99 | FW | COD | Jonathan Bolingi |

(Thailand) BG Pathum United
Manager: (Japan) Makoto Teguramori

Note: Flags indicate national team as defined under FIFA eligibility rules; some limited exceptions apply. Players may hold more than one non-FIFA nationality.

| No. | Pos. | Nation | Player |
|---|---|---|---|
| 1 | GK | THA | Chatchai Bootprom |
| 2 | DF | THA | Nakin Wisetchat |
| 3 | DF | THA | Saharat Pongsuwan |
| 6 | MF | THA | Sarach Yooyen |
| 7 | FW | BRA | Diogo |
| 8 | MF | THA | Worachit Kanitsribampen |
| 9 | FW | THA | Surachat Sareepim |
| 10 | FW | THA | Teerasil Dangda |
| 11 | MF | THA | Jaroensak Wonggorn |
| 13 | DF | THA | Ernesto Phumipha |
| 15 | DF | THA | Apisit Sorada |
| 16 | DF | THA | Jakkapan Praisuwan |
| 17 | DF | SGP | Irfan Fandi |
| 18 | MF | THA | Pathompol Charoenrattanapirom |
| 20 | FW | BRA | Conrado |
| 21 | FW | ISR | Lidor Cohen |

| No. | Pos. | Nation | Player |
|---|---|---|---|
| 22 | DF | THA | Santiphap Channgom |
| 23 | DF | THA | Adisak Sosungnoen |
| 24 | MF | THA | Chatmongkol Thongkiri |
| 26 | GK | THA | Kittipong Phuthawchueak |
| 27 | MF | PHI | Jesse Curran |
| 28 | MF | THA | Nattapon Worasut |
| 29 | FW | THA | Chatree Chimtalay |
| 30 | DF | VEN | Andrés Túñez |
| 32 | GK | THA | Supanai Juntrapasit |
| 36 | MF | THA | Phitiwat Sukjitthammakul |
| 39 | GK | THA | Prasit Padungchok |
| 41 | DF | BRA | Cássio Scheid |
| 47 | FW | THA | Thammayut Rakbun |
| 48 | MF | THA | Kanokpon Buspakom |
| 99 | FW | SGP | Ikhsan Fandi |

== Teams ==
Locations of the 2022 J.League Asia Challenge Host Stadiums

| Nation | Team | Location | Confederation | Sub-Confederation | League | Last league placement |
|---|---|---|---|---|---|---|
| Japan | Kawasaki Frontale | Kawasaki | AFC | EAFF | J.League | 2021 J1 Champions |
| Japan | Consadole Sapporo | Sapporo | AFC | EAFF | J.League | 2021 J1 10th place |
| Thailand | Pathum United | Pathum Thani | AFC | AFF | Thai League 1 | 2021–22 TL1 Champions |
| Thailand | Buriram United | Buri Ram | AFC | AFF | Thai League 1 | 2021–22 TL1 Runners-up |

== Fixtures and results ==
All times are Thailand Standard Time (UTC+7).

| Pos | Team | Pld | W | D | L | GF | GA | GD | Pts |
|---|---|---|---|---|---|---|---|---|---|
| 1 | (Japan) Kawasaki Frontale | 2 | 1 | 1 | 0 | 6 | 4 | +2 | 4 |
| 2 | (Thailand) Buriram United | 1 | 1 | 0 | 0 | 5 | 2 | +3 | 3 |
| 3 | (Japan) Consadole Sapporo | 2 | 0 | 1 | 1 | 5 | 8 | −3 | 1 |
| 4 | (Thailand) BG Pathum United | 1 | 0 | 0 | 1 | 1 | 3 | −2 | 0 |

Updated to match(es) played on 15 November 2022. Source: J.League

== Matches ==
12 November 2022
17:00 UTC+7

| BG Pathum United (Thailand) | 1–3 | (Japan) Kawasaki Frontale |
|---|---|---|
| Conrado 63' | Report | Chinen 57'; Tachibanada 65'; Marcinho 75' |

BG Stadium, Pathum Thani
Attendance: 10,089

12 November 2022
19:00 UTC+7

| Buriram United (Thailand) | 5–2 | (Japan) Consadole Sapporo |
|---|---|---|
| Masika 7'; Nakamura 9' (o.g.); Arthit 61'; Doumbouya 66'; Supachai 86' | Report | Ogashiwa 14'; Fujimura 16' |

Chang Arena, Buriram
Attendance: 22,977

15 November 2022
18:00 UTC+7

| Kawasaki Frontale (Japan) | 3–3 | (Japan) Consadole Sapporo |
|---|---|---|
| Tachibanada 31'; Miyagi 36'; Marcinho 64' | Report | Nakamura 11'; Supachok 29'; Ogashiwa 51' |

BG Stadium, Pathum Thani
Attendance: 7,547

== Top scorers ==
As of 15 November 2022

| Rank | Player | Club | Goals |
|---|---|---|---|
| 1 | (Brazil) Marcinho | (Japan) Kawasaki Frontale | 2 |
| 1 | (Japan) Tsuyoshi Ogashiwa | (Japan) Hokkaido Consadole Sapporo | 2 |
| 1 | (Japan) Kento Tachibanada | (Japan) Kawasaki Frontale | 2 |
| 4 | (Thailand) Arthit Boodjinda | (Thailand) Buriram United | 1 |
| 4 | (Thailand) Supachai Chaided | (Thailand) Buriram United | 1 |
| 4 | (Brazil) Conrado | (Thailand) BG Pathum United | 1 |
| 4 | (Japan) Kei Chinen | (Japan) Kawasaki Frontale | 1 |
| 4 | (France) Lonsana Doumbouya | (Thailand) Buriram United | 1 |
| 4 | (Japan) Ren Fujimura | (Japan) Hokkaido Consadole Sapporo | 1 |
| 4 | (Kenya) Ayub Masika | (Thailand) Buriram United | 1 |
| 4 | (Japan) Ten Miyagi | (Japan) Kawasaki Frontale | 1 |
| 4 | (Japan) Toya Nakamura | (Japan) Hokkaido Consadole Sapporo | 1 |
| 4 | (Thailand) Supachok Sarachat | (Japan) Hokkaido Consadole Sapporo | 1 |

== Broadcasting ==
In Thailand, matches were broadcast by Siamsport's YouTube Channel, and by PPTV, a digital terrestrial television. On Japan, matches were broadcast by J.League Official YouTube Channel (in Japanese). Viewers from overseas watched the matches on the J.League International YouTube channel.
