= Taichi Nakamura =

Taichi Nakamura may refer to:

- Taichi Nakamura (footballer) (born 1993), Japanese football midfielder
- Taichi Nakamura (shogi) (born 1988), Japanese shogi player
