= Shota Nishino =

Japanese footballer (born 2004)

Personal information
- Date of birth: 28 May 2004 (age 22)
- Place of birth: Hokkaido, Japan
- Height: 1.79 m (5 ft 10 in)
- Position: Centre back

Team information
- Current team: Hokkaido Consadole Sapporo
- Number: 47

Youth career
- –2021: Hokkaido Consadole Sapporo

Senior career*
Years	Team	Apps	(Gls)
2021–	Hokkaido Consadole Sapporo	53	(1)
2024	→ Kamatamare Sanuki (loan)	13	(0)
- * Club domestic league appearances and goals as of 13 August 2026

Shota Nishino (西野 奨太, Nishino Shota; born 28 May 2004) is a Japanese footballer currently playing as a centre back for Hokkaido Consadole Sapporo.

== Club career ==
Nishino made his professional debut in a 1–2 Emperor's Cup loss against V-Varen Nagasaki.

== Career statistics ==
=== Club ===
As of 7 July 2021.

Club	Season	League			National Cup		League Cup		Other		Total	
Club	Season	Division	Apps	Goals	Apps	Goals	Apps	Goals	Apps	Goals	Apps	Goals
Hokkaido Consadole Sapporo	2021	J1 League	0	0	1 (Note: Appearances in the Emperor's Cup)	0	0	0	0	0	1	0
Career total			0	0	1	0	0	0	0	0	1	0
