= Masashi Kokubun =

Japanese footballer

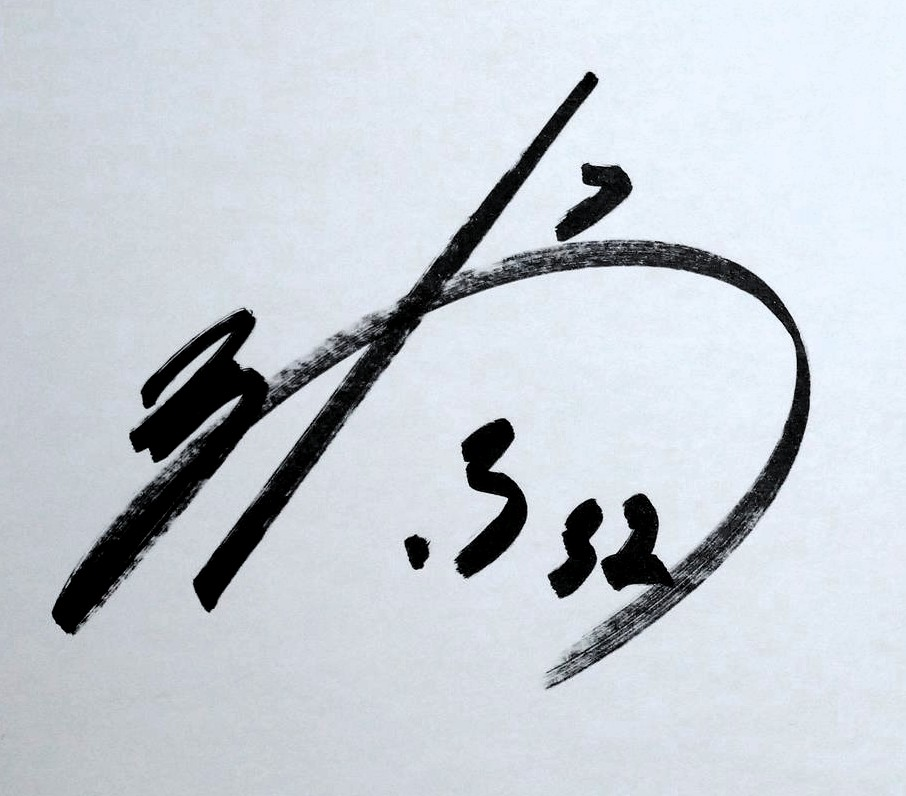

Personal information
- Date of birth: 14 May 1995 (age 31)
- Place of birth: Sapporo, Hokkaido, Japan
- Height: 1.74 m (5 ft 9 in)
- Position: Midfielder

Team information
- Current team: Kamatamare Sanuki
- Number: 5

Youth career
- -2007: Hachiken Kita SSS
- 2008–2013: Consadole Sapporo

College career
Years	Team	Apps	(Gls)
2014–2017	Kindai University		

Senior career*
Years	Team	Apps	(Gls)
2018–2020	Vanraure Hachinohe	93	(5)
2021	Blaublitz Akita	5	(0)
2022–2025	Vanraure Hachinohe	110	(5)
2026–	Kamatamare Sanuki	11	(1)
- * Club domestic league appearances and goals as of 17 August 2026

Masashi Kokubun (國分 将, Kokubun Masashi; born 14 May 1995) is a Japanese footballer currently playing as a midfielder for Kamatamare Sanuki.

== Career statistics ==
=== Club ===
As of 26 December 2021.

Club	Season	League			National Cup		League Cup		Other		Total	
Club	Season	Division	Apps	Goals	Apps	Goals	Apps	Goals	Apps	Goals	Apps	Goals
Vanraure Hachinohe	2018	JFL	29	3	0	0	–		0	0	29	3
Vanraure Hachinohe	2019	J3 League	33	1	3 (Note: Appearances in the Emperor's Cup)	1	0	0	0	0	35	2
Vanraure Hachinohe	2020	J3 League	26	1	0	0	0	0	0	0	0	0
Blaublitz Akita	2021	J2 League	5	0	0	0	0	0	0	0	5	0
Vanraure Hachinohe	2022	J3 League	0	0	0	0	0	0	0	0	0	0
Career total			93	5	3	1	0	0	0	0	96	6
