= Ren Fujimura =

Japanese footballer (born 1999)

Ren Fujimura 藤村 怜
Personal information
- Full name: Ren Fujimura
- Date of birth: May 26, 1999 (age 27)
- Place of birth: Kuriyama, Hokkaido, Japan
- Height: 1.76 m (5 ft 9 1/2 in)
- Positions: Attacking midfielder; forward

Team information
- Current team: Thespa Gunma
- Number: 27

Youth career
- Kuriyama FC
- –2017: Hokkaido Consadole Sapporo

Senior career*
Years	Team	Apps	(Gls)
2017–2023	Hokkaido Consadole Sapporo	1	(0)
2021	→ Montedio Yamagata (loan)	5	(0)
2023-2024	→ Iwate Grulla Morioka (loan)	37	(2)
2024-	Thespa Gunma	47	(2)
- * Club domestic league appearances and goals as of 25 August 2026

Ren Fujimura (藤村 怜, Fujimura Ren; born May 26, 1999) is a Japanese footballer who plays as a forward for J3 League club Thespa Gunma.

== Early life ==
Ren was born in Kuriyama. He played for Hokkaido Consadole Sapporo's youth side.

== Career ==
Ren Fujimura was promoted to J1 League club Hokkaido Consadole Sapporo from the youth team in 2017. On May 3, he made his debut in the J.League Cup (v FC Tokyo).

Ren made his debut for Montedio Yamagata against Ventforet Kofu on 5 May 2021.

Ren made his debut for Iwate against Ehime on 5 March 2023. He scored his first goal for the club on 6 August 2023.

== Club statistics ==
As of 18 March 2023.

Appearances and goals by club, season and competition
Club	Season	League			Cup		League Cup		Total	
Club	Season	Division	Apps	Goals	Apps	Goals	Apps	Goals	Apps	Goals
Japan			League		Emperor's Cup		J.League Cup		Total	
Hokkaido Consadole Sapporo	2017	J1 League	0	0	0	0	1	0	1	0
Hokkaido Consadole Sapporo	2018	J1 League	0	0	0	0	3	0	3	0
Hokkaido Consadole Sapporo	2019	J1 League	1	0	1	1	7	0	9	1
Hokkaido Consadole Sapporo	2020	J1 League	0	0	0	0	2	0	2	0
Hokkaido Consadole Sapporo	2022	J1 League	0	0	2	0	1	0	3	0
Hokkaido Consadole Sapporo	Total		1	0	3	1	14	0	18	1
Montedio Yamagata (loan)	2021	J2 League	5	0	1	0	–		6	0
Iwate Grulla Morioka (loan)	2023	J3 League	2	0	0	0	–		2	0
Career total			8	0	4	1	14	0	26	1

== Honours ==
Hokkaido Consadole Sapporo

- J.League Cup (runners-up, 2019)
