= Yuta Nobe =

Japanese footballer

Personal information
- Date of birth: 4 June 1998 (age 28)
- Place of birth: Kagawa, Japan
- Height: 1.68 m (5 ft 6 in)
- Position: Forward

Team information
- Current team: J-Lease FC
- Number: 15

Youth career
- –2016: JFA Academy Fukushima
- 2017–2020: Ritsumeikan University

Senior career*
| Years | Team | Apps | (Gls) |
| 2021–2023 | Fukushima United | 63 | (3) |
| 2024– | J-Lease FC | 11 | (7) |
- * Club domestic league appearances and goals as of 15:45, 3 July 2024 (UTC)

Yuta Nobe (延 祐太, Nobe Yuta; born 4 June 1998) is a Japanese footballer currently playing as a forward for J-Lease FC.

== Career statistics ==
As of 3 July 2024.

Appearances and goals by club, season and competition
| Club | Season | League | | | Emperor's Cup | | J.League Cup | | Total | |
| Club | Season | Division | Apps | Goals | Apps | Goals | Apps | Goals | Apps | Goals |
|---|---|---|---|---|---|---|---|---|---|---|
| Ritsumeikan University | 2019 | – | | | 2 | 1 | – | | 2 | 1 |
| Fukushima United | 2021 | J3 League | 12 | 0 | – | | – | | 12 | 0 |
| Fukushima United | 2022 | J3 League | 31 | 3 | 2 | 0 | – | | 33 | 3 |
| Fukushima United | 2023 | J3 League | 20 | 0 | 2 | 0 | – | | 69 | 0 |
| J-Lease FC | 2024 | Japanese Regional Leagues | 11 | 7 | 2 | 0 | – | | 13 | 7 |
| Career total | | | 74 | 10 | 8 | 1 | 0 | 0 | 129 | 11 |
