= Kanta Matsumoto =

Japanese footballer

Kanta Matsumoto 松本 幹太
Personal information
- Date of birth: 16 July 1998 (age 28)
- Place of birth: Tokyo, Japan
- Height: 1.72 m (5 ft 8 in)
- Position: Midfielder

Team information
- Current team: Veroskronos Tsuno

Youth career
- –2010: MIP FC
- 2011–2016: Tokyo Verdy

College career
Years	Team	Apps	(Gls)
2017–2020	Toin University of Yokohama		

Senior career*
Years	Team	Apps	(Gls)
2020–2023	Montedio Yamagata	10	(0)
2023	→ Tegevajaro Miyazaki (loan)	11	(0)
2024–	Veroskronos Tsuno	0	(0)
- * Club domestic league appearances and goals as of 12:14, 13 February 2024 (UTC)

Kanta Matsumoto (松本 幹太, Matsumoto Kenta; born 16 July 1998) is a Japanese footballer who plays as a midfielder for Veroskronos Tsuno.

== Career statistics ==
=== Club ===
As of the end of 2023 season.

Appearances and goals by club, season and competition
Club	Season	League			National Cup (Note: Appearances in the Emperor's Cup)		Other		Total	
Club	Season	Division	Apps	Goals	Apps	Goals	Apps	Goals	Apps	Goals
Toin University of Yokohama	2019	–			2	1	0	0	2	1
Toin University of Yokohama	2020	–			2	1	0	0	2	1
Toin University of Yokohama	Total		0	0	4	2	0	0	4	2
Montedio Yamagata	2020	J2 League	0	0	0	0	0	0	0	0
Montedio Yamagata	2021	J2 League	10	0	1	0	0	0	11	0
Montedio Yamagata	2022	J2 League	0	0	0	0	0	0	0	0
Montedio Yamagata	Total		10	0	1	0	0	0	11	0
Tegevajaro Miyazaki	2023	J3 League	11	0	1	0	0	0	12	0
Tegevajaro Miyazaki	Total		11	0	1	0	0	0	12	0
Career total			21	0	6	2	0	0	27	2
