= Ryo Shinzato =

Japanese footballer

Ryo Shinzato 新里 亮
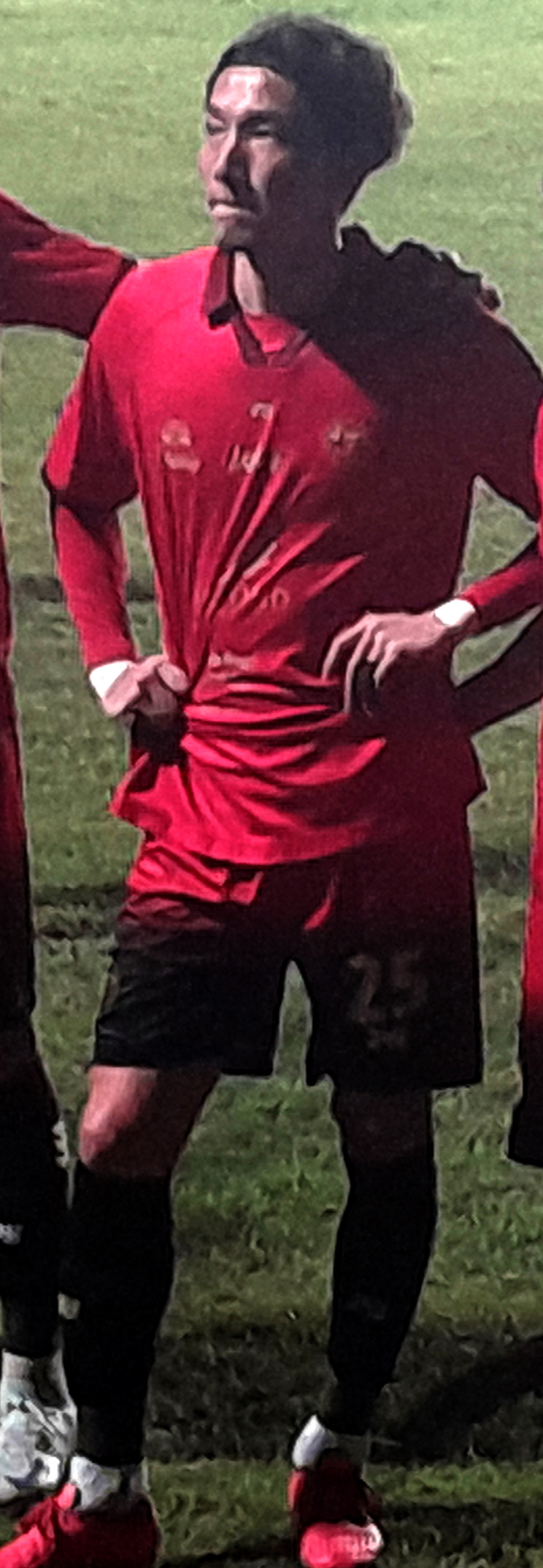
- 2025 Ryo Shinzato with Chiangmai United

Personal information
- Full name: Ryo Shinzato
- Date of birth: 19 May 1990 (age 36)
- Place of birth: Aichi, Japan
- Height: 1.84 m (6 ft 0 in)
- Position: Centre back

Team information
- Current team: Chiangmai United
- Number: 25

Youth career
- 2009–2012: Chukyo University

Senior career*
Years	Team	Apps	(Gls)
2013–2015	Mito Hollyhock	65	(2)
2016–2017	Ventforet Kofu	47	(0)
2018–2020	Júbilo Iwata	36	(0)
2020	→ Gamba Osaka U23 (loan)	3	(0)
2020	→ Gamba Osaka (loan)	1	(0)
2021–2022	V-Varen Nagasaki	32	(1)
2022–2024	Omiya Ardija	64	(3)
2024–	Chiangmai United	27	(1)
- * Club domestic league appearances and goals as of 8 March 2025 (UTC)

Ryo Shinzato (新里 亮, Shinzato Ryō; born 2 July 1990 in Aichi, Japan) is a Japanese football player who plays for Chiangmai United in Thai League 2.

== Club career statistics ==
Updated to 19 February 2019.

Appearances and goals by club, season and competition
Club	Season	League			Emperor's Cup		J.League Cup		Total	
Club	Season	Division	Apps	Goals	Apps	Goals	Apps	Goals	Apps	Goals
Mito Hollyhock	2013	J2 League	15	1	0	0	—		15	1
Mito Hollyhock	2014	J2 League	42	1	0	0	—		42	1
Mito Hollyhock	2015	J2 League	8	0	0	0	—		8	0
Ventforet Kofu	2016	J1 League	14	0	1	0	5	0	20	0
Ventforet Kofu	2017	J1 League	33	0	0	0	3	0	36	0
Júbilo Iwata	2018	J1 League	16	0	0	0	3	0	19	0
Career total			128	2	1	0	11	0	140	2
