= Yusuke Goto =

Japanese footballer (born 1993)

Yusuke Goto 後藤 優介
Personal information
- Full name: Yusuke Goto
- Date of birth: April 23, 1993 (age 33)
- Place of birth: Kanoya, Kagoshima, Japan
- Height: 1.71 m (5 ft 7 in)
- Positions: Forward; attacking midfielder

Team information
- Current team: Kamatamare Sanuki
- Number: 10

Youth career
- –2005: Kasanohara Elementary School
- 2006–2008: Kanoya Higashi Junior High School
- 2009–2011: Oita Trinita

Senior career*
Years	Team	Apps	(Gls)
2012–2019	Oita Trinita	139	(40)
2012	→ Hoyo Oita (loan)	9	(0)
2014	→ J. League U-22 (loan)	2	(2)
2020–2022	Shimizu S-Pulse	65	(25)
2023-2024	Montedio Yamagata	53	(4)
2025-	Kamatamare Sanuki	43	(10)
- * Club domestic league appearances and goals as of 17 August 2026

Yusuke Goto (後藤 優介, born April 23, 1993) is a Japanese football player for Kamatamare Sanuki.

== Career statistics ==
Updated to 24 July 2022.

Appearances and goals by club, season and competition
Club	Season	League			Emperor's Cup		J.League Cup		Total	
Club	Season	Division	Apps	Goals	Apps	Goals	Apps	Goals	Apps	Goals
Oita Trinita	2012	J2 League	2	0	–		–		2	0
Hoyo Oita	2012	JFL	9	0	2	1	–		11	1
Oita Trinita	2013	J1 League	3	0	3	1	1	0	7	1
Oita Trinita	2014	J2 League	20	2	0	0	–		20	2
Oita Trinita	2015	J2 League	29	3	3	1	–		32	4
Oita Trinita	2016	J3 League	24	14	1	0	–		25	14
Oita Trinita	2017	J2 League	41	17	1	0	–		42	17
Oita Trinita	2018	J2 League	28	10	1	0	–		29	10
Oita Trinita	2019	J1 League	16	2	3	1	5	3	24	6
Shimizu S-Pulse	2020	J1 League	32	1	–		1	0	33	1
Shimizu S-Pulse	2021	J1 League	18	1	3	0	7	0	28	1
Shimizu S-Pulse	2022	J1 League	9	0	2	0	1	0	12	0
Career total			231	50	19	4	15	3	265	57
