= Shochi Niiyama =

Japanese footballer

Personal information
- Date of birth: 13 April 1985 (age 41)
- Place of birth: Gonohe, Aomori, Japan
- Height: 1.72 m (5 ft 8 in)
- Position: Midfielder

Team information
- Current team: Vanraure Hachinohe
- Number: 10

Youth career
- 2001–2003: Kosei Gakuin HS
- 2004–2007: Hachinohe Gakuin University

Senior career*
| Years | Team | Apps | (Gls) |
| 2008– | Vanraure Hachinohe | 193 | (10) |
- * Club domestic league appearances and goals as of 17:04, 12 November 2020 (UTC)

Shochi Niiyama (新井山 祥智, Niiyama Shochi; born 13 April 1985) is a Japanese footballer currently playing as a midfielder for Vanraure Hachinohe.

== Career statistics ==
=== Club ===
As of 12 November 2020.

| Club | Season | League | | | National Cup | | League Cup | | Other | | Total | |
| Club | Season | Division | Apps | Goals | Apps | Goals | Apps | Goals | Apps | Goals | Apps | Goals |
|---|---|---|---|---|---|---|---|---|---|---|---|---|
| Vanraure Hachinohe | 2014 | JFL | 26 | 0 | 1 (Note: Appearances in the Emperor's Cup) | 0 | – | | 0 | 0 | 27 | 0 |
| Vanraure Hachinohe | 2015 | JFL | 24 | 2 | 0 | 0 | – | | 2 (Note: Appearances in the JFL Championship) | 0 | 26 | 2 |
| Vanraure Hachinohe | 2016 | JFL | 29 | 4 | 1 | 0 | – | | 0 | 0 | 30 | 4 |
| Vanraure Hachinohe | 2017 | JFL | 30 | 0 | 2 | 0 | – | | 0 | 0 | 32 | 0 |
| Vanraure Hachinohe | 2018 | JFL | 30 | 3 | 0 | 0 | – | | 0 | 0 | 29 | 3 |
| Vanraure Hachinohe | 2019 | J3 League | 31 | 0 | 3 | 1 | 0 | 0 | 0 | 0 | 34 | 1 |
| Vanraure Hachinohe | 2020 | J3 League | 23 | 1 | 0 | 0 | 0 | 0 | 0 | 0 | 23 | 1 |
| Career total | | | 193 | 10 | 7 | 1 | 0 | 0 | 2 | 0 | 202 | 11 |
