= Sota Higashide =

Japanese footballer

Sota Higashide 東出 壮太
Personal information
- Date of birth: 24 August 1998 (age 28)
- Place of birth: Tsu, Mie, Japan
- Height: 1.62 m (5 ft 4 in)
- Position: Midfielder

Team information
- Current team: Solomon Kings
- Number: 27

Youth career
- Nishigaoka SSS
- FC Volare
- 2014–2016: Tsu Kogyo High School

College career
Years	Team	Apps	(Gls)
2017–2020	Hokuriku University		

Senior career*
Years	Team	Apps	(Gls)
2021–2023	Roasso Kumamoto	20	(0)
2023–2024	Tegevajaro Miyazaki	26	(0)
2024–2026	Gainare Tottori	19	(0)
2026–	Solomon Kings	14	(5)
- * Club domestic league appearances and goals as of 5 February 2026

Sota Higashide (東出 壮太, Higashide Sota; born 24 August 1998) is a Japanese professional footballer who plays as a midfielder for Solomon Kings.

== Career ==
On 26 December 2022, Higashide joined J3 club Tegevajaro Miyazaki for the 2023 season.

== Career statistics ==
=== Club ===
As of the end 2022 season.

Club	Season	League			National Cup		League Cup		Other		Total	
Club	Season	Division	Apps	Goals	Apps	Goals	Apps	Goals	Apps	Goals	Apps	Goals
Hokuriku University	2019	–			1 (Note: Appearances in the Emperor's Cup)	0	–		0	0	1	0
Roasso Kumamoto	2020	J3 League	3	0	0	0	–		0	0	3	0
Roasso Kumamoto	2021	J3 League	10	0	2	0	–		0	0	12	0
Roasso Kumamoto	2022	J2 League	5	0	0	0	–		0	0	5	0
Roasso Kumamoto	Total		18	0	3	0	0	0	0	0	20	0
Tegevajaro Miyazaki	2023	J3 League	0	0	0	0	–		0	0	0	0
Tegevajaro Miyazaki	Total		0	0	0	0	0	0	0	0	0	0
Career total			18	0	3	0	0	0	0	0	21	0

== Honours ==
Individual

- OFC Professional League Team of the Season: 2026
