= Kamatamare Sanuki =

Japanese football club

Kamatamare Sanuki カマタマーレ讃岐
- Full name: Kamatamare Sanuki
- Founded: 1956; 70 years ago
- Ground: Shikoku Kasei Meglio Stadium, Marugame, Kagawa
- Capacity: 30,099
- Chairman: Nobuhiro Kawamura
- Manager: Naoto Otake
- League: J3 League
- 2024: J3 League, 16th of 20
- Website: kamatamare.jp
| Home colours | Away colours |

Kamatamare Sanuki (カマタマーレ讃岐、Kamatamāre Sanuki) is a professional football club based in Takamatsu, the capital city of Kagawa Prefecture of Japan. They currently play in the J3 League, the Japanese third tier of professional football.

The first part of their name was coined by combining the Japanese word Kamatama (a type of udon noodle bowl) and the Italian Mare ("Sea"). The second part is what Kagawa Prefecture used to be called. Their name, as well as their crest, that features a kamatama udon bowl, gained a significant interest and recognition, as the club instantly became one of the most-known non-league sides in Japan when their new name and crest was announced in October 2005.

== History ==
The club was founded in 1956 as Takasho OB (Old Boys) Soccer Club (高商OBサッカークラブ) by the former students of Takamatsu Commercial High School's soccer club. Since renaming themselves Kagawa Shiun Football Club (香川紫雲フットボールクラブ) in 1991, they have been the leading football club in Kagawa, winning the Shikoku League Championship twice. The club's name changed again in 2000 to Sun Life (サンライフ) Football Club, when a consumer loan company Sun Life signed a sponsorship deal that continued until the end of the 2004 season.

In October 2005, after briefly being called Takamatsu Football Club, the club officially announced their intention to rise to J.League status and changed their name to Kamatamare Sanuki. In 2010 they won the non-league treble by winning the Shikoku League, the Shakaijin Cup and the Regional League Promotion Series, and by virtue of the latter they were at last promoted to the Japan Football League.

They entered the J3 League ahead of the season 2014, after finishing as runners-up in the Japan Football League in the previous season, having won the J2–J3 promotion/relegation playoff by beating Gainare Tottori 2–1 on aggregate. In 2018, Kamatamare Sanuki got relegated to the J3 League from 2019. On 26 September 2023, Kamatamare Sanuki was declared to have met the requirements to obtain a license up to the J1 League level.

== Stadium ==
The home stadium is Kagawa Prefectural Marugame Stadium in Marugame City (from September 1, 2015 ~ August 31, 2025, it was called 'Pikara Stadium' under naming rights; from January 1, 2026~ under naming rights, 'Shikoku Kasei' It is called 'MEGLIO Stadium' (with a fixed seating capacity of 22,338), and is the only stadium in Kagawa Prefecture that meets the standards of a J1 license or higher. On the other hand, Yashima Rexam Field in Takamatsu City (capacity about 6,000 people) meets J3 standards, and since 2024, J3 official matches have been held at the same venue irregularly.

During the JFL era, the Kagawa Prefectural Sports Park Soccer and Rugby Stadium and Marugame Stadium in Takamatsu City were also used as their home stadiums. During the Shikoku League era, the Kagawa Prefectural General Sports Park Soccer and Rugby Field and Marugame Stadium were also used as their home stadiums.

After a complete renovation in April 2017, Yashima Rexam Field has been using the main stadium as a training ground several times a month. In the pre-renovation plan, there was a proposal to design a stadium that would meet at least J2 standards (10,000 seats at the time) for promotion to the J.League for Kamatamare, but issues such as noise, impact on surrounding traffic, and a renovation plan focused on football were raised in the council. As a result, at the city council plenary session held on March 8, 2011, Takamatsu Mayor Hideto Onishi announced a policy to develop the stadium to meet J.League standards at the initial stage, but in the future, renovations such as the stands will enable it to accommodate J2-level matches. As a result, the renewal plan to meet J2 standards was cancelled. Currently, Yashima Rexam Field has 5,000 seats, meeting the J3 standard (generally 5,000 or more). Even after being relegated to J3 in 2019, all home matches were held in Marugame, but following the October 6, 2024 match against Gainare Tottori, the club has now hosted Yashima about once or twice a year.

== League record ==
| Champions | Runners-up | Third place | Promoted | Relegated |

| League | | | | | | | | | | | | | J.League Cup | Emperor's Cup | Shakaijin Cup |
| Season | Division | Tier | Pos | P | W | D | L | F | A | GD | Pts | Attendance/G | J.League Cup | Emperor's Cup | Shakaijin Cup |
|---|---|---|---|---|---|---|---|---|---|---|---|---|---|---|---|
Takasho OB
| 1977 | Shikoku; League | | 6th | 14 | 4 | 2 | 8 | 32 | 54 | -22 | 10 | | Not eligible | | |
| 1978 | Shikoku; League | | 8th | 14 | 1 | 2 | 11 | 18 | 48 | -30 | 4 | | Not eligible | | |
| 1979 | Kagawa; Pref. League | | 1st | ? | ? | ? | ? | | | | ? | | Not eligible | | |
| 1980 | Kagawa; Pref. League | | 1st | ? | ? | ? | ? | | | | ? | | Not eligible | | |
| 1981 | Shikoku; League | | 5th | 14 | 7 | 1 | 6 | 26 | 31 | -5 | 15 | | Not eligible | | |
| 1982 | Shikoku; League | | 8th | 14 | 4 | 1 | 2 | 19 | 26 | 7 | 13 | | Not eligible | | |
| 1983 | Shikoku; League | | 2nd | 16 | 10 | 1 | 5 | 45 | 32 | 13 | 21 | | Not eligible | | |
| 1984 | Shikoku; League | | 2nd | 14 | 6 | 5 | 3 | 33 | 30 | 3 | 17 | | Not eligible | | |
| 1985 | Shikoku; League | | 6th | 14 | 5 | 1 | 8 | 26 | 48 | -22 | 11 | | Not eligible | | |
| 1986 | Shikoku; League | | 7th | 14 | 3 | 2 | 9 | 15 | 25 | -10 | 8 | | Not eligible | | |
| 1987 | Shikoku; League | | 8th | 14 | 1 | 2 | 11 | 12 | 53 | -41 | 4 | | Not eligible | | |
| 1988 | Shikoku; League | | 7th | 14 | 5 | 0 | 9 | 16 | 42 | -26 | 10 | | Not eligible | | |
| 1989 | Shikoku; League | | 6th | 14 | 5 | 2 | 7 | 15 | 43 | -28 | 12 | | Not eligible | | |
| 1990 | Shikoku; League | | 6th | 14 | 3 | 3 | 8 | 15 | 31 | -16 | 9 | | Not eligible | | |
Kagawa Shiun
| 1991 | Shikoku; League | | 2nd | 14 | 10 | 1 | 3 | 42 | 15 | 27 | 21 | | Not eligible | | |
| 1992 | Shikoku; League | | 3rd | 14 | 8 | 2 | 4 | 49 | 16 | 33 | 18 | | Not eligible | | |
| 1993 | Shikoku; League | | 2nd | 14 | 11 | 0 | 3 | 53 | 18 | 35 | 22 | | Not eligible | | |
| 1994 | Shikoku; League | | 1st | 13 | 11 | 1 | 1 | 46 | 12 | 34 | 23 | | Not eligible | | |
| 1995 | Shikoku; League | | 2nd | 14 | 9 | 3 | 2 | 42 | 17 | 25 | 30 | | Not eligible | | |
| 1996 | Shikoku; League | | 2nd | 14 | 10 | 1 | 3 | 41 | 19 | 22 | 31 | | Not eligible | | |
| 1997 | Shikoku; League | | 1st | 14 | 9 | 3 | 2 | 47 | 24 | 23 | 30 | | Not eligible | | |
| 1998 | Shikoku; League | | 3rd | 14 | 6 | 4 | 4 | 21 | 17 | 4 | 22 | | Not eligible | | |
| 1999 | Shikoku; League | 4 | 2nd | 14 | 9 | 1 | 4 | 41 | 25 | 16 | 28 | | Not eligible | | |
Sun Life FC
| 2000 | Shikoku; League | 4 | 4th | 14 | 8 | 1 | 5 | 35 | 32 | 3 | 25 | | Not eligible | | |
| 2001 | Shikoku; League | 4 | 3rd | 14 | 7 | 3 | 4 | 45 | 25 | 20 | 24 | | Not eligible | | |
| 2002 | Shikoku; League | 4 | 2nd | 14 | 10 | 0 | 4 | 33 | 28 | 5 | 30 | | Not eligible | | |
| 2003 | Shikoku; League | 4 | 6th | 14 | 4 | 1 | 9 | 28 | 36 | -8 | 13 | | Not eligible | | |
| 2004 | Shikoku; League | 4 | 3rd | 14 | 8 | 0 | 6 | 29 | 26 | 3 | 24 | | Not eligible | | |
Takamatsu Football Club
| 2005 | Shikoku; League | 4 | 4th | 14 | 6 | 4 | 4 | 31 | 24 | 7 | 22 | | Not eligible | | |
Kamatamare Sanuki
| 2006 | Shikoku; League | 4 | 1st | 14 | 12 | 1 | 1 | 45 | 12 | 33 | 37 | | Not eligible | | |
| 2007 | Shikoku; League | 4 | 2nd | 14 | 12 | 1 | 1 | 68 | 14 | 54 | 37 | | Not eligible | | |
| 2008 | Shikoku; League | 4 | 1st | 14 | 13 | 1 | 0 | 62 | 4 | 58 | 40 | | Not eligible | | |
| 2009 | Shikoku; League | 4 | 2nd | 14 | 12 | 0 | 2 | 56 | 10 | 46 | 36 | | Not eligible | 2nd round | |
| 2010 | Shikoku; League | 4 | 1st | 14 | 12 | 2 | 0 | 53 | 5 | 48 | 38 | | Not eligible | 2nd round | Winners |
| 2011 | JFL | 3 | 11th | 33 | 11 | 7 | 15 | 39 | 49 | -10 | 40 | 3,025 | Not eligible | 2nd round | Not eligible |
| 2012 | JFL | 3 | 4th | 32 | 15 | 8 | 9 | 49 | 29 | 20 | 53 | 2,344 | Not eligible | 3rd round | Not eligible |
| 2013 | JFL | 3 | 2nd | 34 | 21 | 5 | 8 | 49 | 26 | 23 | 68 | 3,125 | Not eligible | 2nd round | Not eligible |
| 2014 | J2; League | 2 | 21st | 42 | 7 | 12 | 23 | 34 | 71 | -37 | 33 | 3,317 | Not eligible | 2nd round | Not eligible |
| 2015 | J2; League | 2 | 16th | 42 | 12 | 15 | 15 | 30 | 33 | -3 | 51 | 3,658 | Not eligible | 2nd round | Not eligible |
| 2016 | J2; League | 2 | 19th | 42 | 10 | 13 | 19 | 43 | 62 | -19 | 43 | 3,686 | Not eligible | 2nd round | Not eligible |
| 2017 | J2; League | 2 | 19th | 42 | 8 | 14 | 20 | 41 | 61 | -20 | 38 | 3,805 | Not eligible | 2nd round | Not eligible |
| 2018 | J2; League | 2 | 22nd | 42 | 7 | 10 | 25 | 28 | 72 | -44 | 31 | 3,073 | Not eligible | 2nd round | Not eligible |
| 2019 | J3 League | 3 | 14th | 34 | 10 | 9 | 15 | 33 | 49 | -19 | 39 | 2,112 | Not eligible | 2nd round | Not eligible |
| 2020 † | J3 League | 3 | 16th | 34 | 7 | 10 | 17 | 33 | 52 | -19 | 31 | 869 | Not eligible | Did not qualify | Not eligible |
| 2021 † | J3 League | 3 | 15th | 28 | 4 | 9 | 15 | 20 | 41 | -21 | 21 | 1,475 | Not eligible | 1st round | Not eligible |
| 2022 | J3 League | 3 | 17th | 34 | 6 | 9 | 19 | 27 | 49 | -22 | 27 | 1,805 | Not eligible | Did not qualify | Not eligible |
| 2023 | J3 League | 3 | 16th | 38 | 11 | 11 | 16 | 29 | 45 | -16 | 44 | 2,062 | Not eligible | 2nd round | Not eligible |
| 2024 | J3 League | 3 | 16th | 38 | 10 | 13 | 15 | 48 | 52 | -4 | 43 | 1,949 | 1st round | 2nd round | Not eligible |
| 2025 | J3 League | 3 | 17th | 38 | 10 | 8 | 20 | 41 | 57 | -16 | 38 | 2,203 | 1st round | 1st round | Not eligible |
| 2026 | J3 League | 3 | 38th | 18 | 5 | 3 | 10 | 14 | 32 | -18 | 19 | 2,892 | N/A | N/A | Not eligible |
| 2026-27 | J3 League | 3 | TBD | 38 | | | | | | | | | TBD | TBD | Not eligible |

Key

- Pos. = Position in league; P = Games played; W = Games won; D = Games drawn; L = Games lost; F = Goals scored; A = Goals conceded; GD = Goals difference; Pts = Points gained
- Attendance/G = Average league home attendance
- † 2020 & 2021 seasons attendances reduced by COVID-19 worldwide pandemic
- Note: The 1994 season saw one game cancelled due to the disqualification of Alex SC who fielded ineligible players. The 2011 season saw one game cancelled as Sony Sendai could not play a full schedule due to the 2011 Tōhoku earthquake and tsunami barring regular use of facilities.

== Honours ==
Kamatamare Sanuki's honours
| Honour | No. | Years |
|---|---|---|
| Shikoku Soccer League | 5 | 1994, 1997, 2006, 2008, 2010 |
| Kagawa Prefectural Football Championship Emperor's Cup Kagawa Prefectural Qualifiers | 19 | 1996,1997,1998,1999,2000,2001,2005,2006,2007,2008, 2009,2010,2011,2012,2019,2021,2023,2024, 2025 |
| Shakaijin Cup | 1 | 2010 |
| Regional League Promotion Series | 1 | 2010 |

== Current squad ==
As of 1 August 2026.

Note: Flags indicate national team as defined under FIFA eligibility rules; some limited exceptions apply. Players may hold more than one non-FIFA nationality.

| No. | Pos. | Nation | Player |
|---|---|---|---|
| 1 | GK | JPN | Yusuke Imamura |
| 5 | MF | JPN | Masashi Kokubun |
| 6 | MF | JPN | Shin Miyazaki |
| 9 | FW | JPN | Yohei Ono |
| 10 | FW | JPN | Yusuke Goto |
| 11 | FW | JPN | Ryoma Sano |
| 14 | MF | JPN | Junsei Ishikura |
| 16 | MF | JPN | Shuri Arita |
| 17 | MF | JPN | Kosei Makiyama |
| 18 | FW | KOR | Lee Jin-yeong |
| 19 | FW | KOR | Kang Dong-won |
| 20 | DF | KOR | Lee Gi-san |
| 21 | MF | JPN | Shun Utsugi (on loan from Tochigi City) |
| 23 | GK | JPN | Chris Takahashi |
| 24 | FW | JPN | Akito Ueno |
| 25 | DF | KOR | Kim Do-hoon |

| No. | Pos. | Nation | Player |
|---|---|---|---|
| 29 | DF | JPN | Keisuke Tao |
| 30 | DF | JPN | Hideki Oka |
| 33 | MF | JPN | Shohei Kawakami |
| 34 | DF | JPN | Rai Namimoto |
| 35 | DF | JPN | Shuto Sago |
| 39 | DF | JPN | Rui Harano |
| 40 | DF | JPN | Shuya Takashima |
| 44 | DF | JPN | Kaito Hayashida |
| 55 | GK | JPN | Kokoro Aoki (on loan from Tokushima Vortis) |
| 60 | MF | JPN | Yuki Morikawa |
| 66 | MF | KOR | Woo Sang-ho |
| 77 | FW | JPN | Yuhi Murakami |
| 86 | MF | JPN | Hauru Asada |
| 88 | FW | KOR | Park Tae-yang |
| 99 | FW | JPN | Rei Yonezawa |

=== Out on loan ===
Note: Flags indicate national team as defined under FIFA eligibility rules; some limited exceptions apply. Players may hold more than one non-FIFA nationality.

| No. | Pos. | Nation | Player |
|---|---|---|---|
| 4 | DF | JPN | Shoma Tsujioka (at Fukui United FC) |
| — | GK | JPN | Kaisei Matsubara (at Edo All United) |

== Coaching staff ==
As of 15 April 2026

| Position | Name |
|---|---|
| Manager | (Japan) Naoto Otake |
| Assistant manager | (South Korea) Kim Jung-hoon (Japan) Ryohei Saito |
| Goalkeeper coach | (Japan) Kenta Shimizu |
| Physical coach | (Japan) Bansaku Igarashi |
| Chief trainer | (Japan) Shinichi Todake |
| Trainer | (Japan) Sotaro Sasaki (Japan) Koshi Fujimoto |
| Side manager | (Japan) Masaki Sueyoshi |
| Equipment manager | (Japan) Koki Izumi |

== Managerial history ==
| Manager | Nationality | Tenure | |
| Manager | Nationality | Start | Finish |
|---|---|---|---|
| Masashi Hachuda | Japan | 1 February 2008 | 31 January 2010 |
| Makoto Kitano | Japan | 1 February 2010 | 31 January 2019 |
| Kenichi Uemura | Japan | 1 February 2019 | 31 January 2020 |
| Kazuhito Mochizuki | Japan | 1 February 2020 | 31 January 2021 |
| Nobuyuki Uenoyama | Japan | 1 February 2021 | 31 March 2021 |
| Toshihiro Nishimura | Japan | 1 April 2021 | 11 April 2021 |
| Zdravko Zemunović | Serbia | 12 April 2021 | 31 January 2022 |
| Toshihiro Nishimura | Japan | 1 February 2022 | 31 January 2023 |
| Atsushi Yoneyama | Japan | 1 February 2023 | 6 July 2025 |
| Kim Jong-song | North Korea | 8 July 2025 | 2 December 2025 |
| Naoto Otake | Japan | 8 December 2025 | present |

== Kit evolution ==
FP 1st
| 2011 | 2012 | 2013 | 2014 | 2015 |
| 2016 | 2017 | 2018 | 2019 | 2020 |
| 2021 | 2022 | 2023 | 2024 | 2025 |
2026 -

FP 2nd
| 2011 - 2012 | 2013 | 2014 | 2015 | 2016 |
| 2017 | 2018 | 2019 | 2020 | 2021 |
| 2022 | 2023 | 2024 | 2025 | 2026 - |

== In pop culture ==
The Kamatamare players made cameo appearances in the 2006 film "UDON" directed by Katsuyuki Motohiro.
