= Taiki Hirato =

Japanese footballer (born 1997)

Taiki Hirato 平戸 太貴
Personal information
- Full name: Taiki Hirato
- Date of birth: 18 April 1997 (age 29)
- Place of birth: Hitachinaka, Ibaraki, Japan
- Height: 1.77 m (5 ft 10 in)
- Position: Midfielder

Team information
- Current team: Shimizu S-Pulse
- Number: 18

Youth career
- 2007–2015: Kashima Antlers

Senior career*
Years	Team	Apps	(Gls)
2016–2019	Kashima Antlers	1	(0)
2017–2018	→ Machida Zelvia (loan)	66	(11)
2019–2022	Machida Zelvia	137	(28)
2023–2026	Kyoto Sanga FC	87	(2)
2026–	Shimizu S-Pulse	2	(0)
Medal record
Kashima Antlers
Winner	J1 League	2016
Winner	Emperor's Cup	2016
- * Club domestic league appearances and goals as of 15:50, 14 October 2026 (UTC)

Taiki Hirato (平戸 太貴, Hirato Taiki; born 18 April 1997) is a Japanese footballer who plays as a midfielder for J1 League club Shimizu S-Pulse.

== Career ==
Taiki Hirato joined J1 League club Kashima Antlers on 25 May 2016, he debuted in J.League Cup (v Júbilo Iwata). He made his league debut for Kashima against Nagoya Grampus on the 5 April 2019.

Taiki made his league debut during his loan spell for Machida against JEF United on the 26 February 2017. He scored his first goal for Machida against Gifu on the 22 July 2017, scoring in the 40th minute.

During his second spell with Machida, Taiki made his league debut against Ventforet Kofu on the 4 August 2019. Taiki scored his first goal for the club against Fagiano Okayama on the 25 August 2019, scoring in the 28th minute.

Taiki made his league debut for Kyoto against Sagan Tosu on the 23 April 2023.

== Club statistics ==
As of 14 October 2026.

Appearances and goals by club, season and competition
Club	Season	League			National cup (Note: Includes Emperor's Cup)		League cup (Note: Includes J.League Cup)		Continental		Total	
Club	Season	Division	Apps	Goals	Apps	Goals	Apps	Goals	Apps	Goals	Apps	Goals
Kashima Antlers	2016	J1 League	0	0	0	0	2	0	0	0	2	0
Kashima Antlers	2019	J1 League	1	0	1	0	0	0	4 (Note: Appearances in AFC Champions League)	1	6	1
Kashima Antlers	Total		1	0	1	0	2	0	4	1	8	1
Machida Zelvia (loan)	2017	J2 League	26	3	1	0	–		–		27	3
Machida Zelvia (loan)	2018	J2 League	40	8	2	1	–		–		42	9
Machida Zelvia (loan)	Total		66	11	3	1	0	0	0	0	69	12
Machida Zelvia	2019	J2 League	17	2	0	0	–		–		17	2
Machida Zelvia	2020	J2 League	42	9	0	0	–		–		42	9
Machida Zelvia	2021	J2 League	40	8	1	0	–		–		41	8
Machida Zelvia	2022	J2 League	38	9	1	0	–		–		39	9
Machida Zelvia	Total		137	28	2	0	0	0	0	0	139	28
Kyoto Sanga	2023	J1 League	13	0	1	0	4	1	–		18	1
Kyoto Sanga	2024	J1 League	26	2	5	1	1	0	–		32	3
Kyoto Sanga	2025	J1 League	34	0	3	0	1	0	–		38	0
Kyoto Sanga	2026	J1 (100)	11	0	–		–		–		11	0
Kyoto Sanga	2026–27	J1 League	3	0	1	0	0	0	–		4	0
Kyoto Sanga	Total		87	2	10	1	6	1	0	0	103	4
Shimizu S-Pulse	2026–27	J1 League	2	0	0	0	2	0	–		4	0
Career total			293	41	16	2	10	1	4	1	323	45
