= Akira Matsuzawa =

Japanese footballer

Akira Matsuzawa 松澤 彰
Personal information
- Date of birth: 18 September 1997 (age 29)
- Place of birth: Nagakute, Aichi, Japan
- Height: 1.89 m (6 ft 2 in)
- Position: Forward

Team information
- Current team: SC Sagamihara

Youth career
- Nagoya FC
- –2016: Urawa Red Diamonds
- 2016–2019: Hosei University

Senior career*
Years	Team	Apps	(Gls)
2020–2021	Kataller Toyama	14	(1)
2020–2022	Tokyo Musashino United	15	(3)
2023–	SC Sagamihara	0	(0)
- * Club domestic league appearances and goals as of 27 November 2022, 10:24 (UTC)

Akira Matsuzawa (松澤 彰, Matsuzawa Akira; born 18 September 1997) is a Japanese footballer currently playing as a forward for SC Sagamihara.

== Career ==
Matsuzawa begin first youth career with Nagoya FC, Urawa Red Diamonds until 2016 and Hosei University from 2016 to 2019 until he was graduation from university.

Matsuzawa begin first professional career with Kataller Toyama in 2020. He leave from the club in 3 December 2021 after two years at Toyama been ended.

On 5 February 2022, Matsuzawa transferred to JFL club, Tokyo Musashino United. After expiration contract at Tokyo Musashino United in a season. On 20 December at same year, Matsuzawa officially transfer to J3 club, SC Sagamihara for upcoming 2023 season.

== Career statistics ==
=== Club ===
As of the start from 2023 season.

Club	Season	League			National Cup		League Cup		Other		Total	
Club	Season	Division	Apps	Goals	Apps	Goals	Apps	Goals	Apps	Goals	Apps	Goals
Hosei University	2019	–			3 (Note: Appearances in the Emperor's Cup)	1	–		0	0	3	1
Kataller Toyama	2020	J3 League	10	1	0	0	0	0	0	0	10	1
Kataller Toyama	2021	J3 League	4	0	1	0	0	0	0	0	5	0
Tokyo Musashino United	2022	Japan Football League	15	3	0	0	0	0	0	0	15	3
SC Sagamihara	2023	J3 League	0	0	0	0	0	0	0	0	0	0
Career total			29	3	4	1	0	0	0	0	33	4
