= Makoto Kawanishi =

Japanese footballer

Personal information
- Date of birth: 21 June 1996 (age 30)
- Place of birth: Yokosuka, Kanagawa, Japan
- Height: 1.77 m (5 ft 10 in)
- Position: Defender

Team information
- Current team: ReinMeer Aomori
- Number: 3

Youth career
- Konan Minami SSC
- Kumagaya SC
- 2012–2014: Maebashi Ikuei High School

College career
Years	Team	Apps	(Gls)
2015–2018	Sanno Institute of Management		

Senior career*
Years	Team	Apps	(Gls)
2019–2024	Fukushima United	87	(0)
2024-	ReinMeer Aomori	12	(1)
- * Club domestic league appearances and goals as of 00:54, 30 August 2023 (UTC)

Makoto Kawanishi (河西 真, Kawanishi Makoto; born 21 June 1996) is a Japanese footballer currently playing as a defender for Fukushima United.

== Career statistics ==
=== Club ===
As of 10 November 2020.

Club	Season	League			National Cup		League Cup		Other		Total	
Club	Season	Division	Apps	Goals	Apps	Goals	Apps	Goals	Apps	Goals	Apps	Goals
Fukushima United	2019	J3 League	23	0	0	0	0	0	0	0	23	0
Fukushima United	2020	J3 League	13	0	0	0	0	0	0	0	13	0
Career total			36	0	0	0	0	0	0	0	36	0
