= Serginho (footballer, born March 1995) =

Footballer

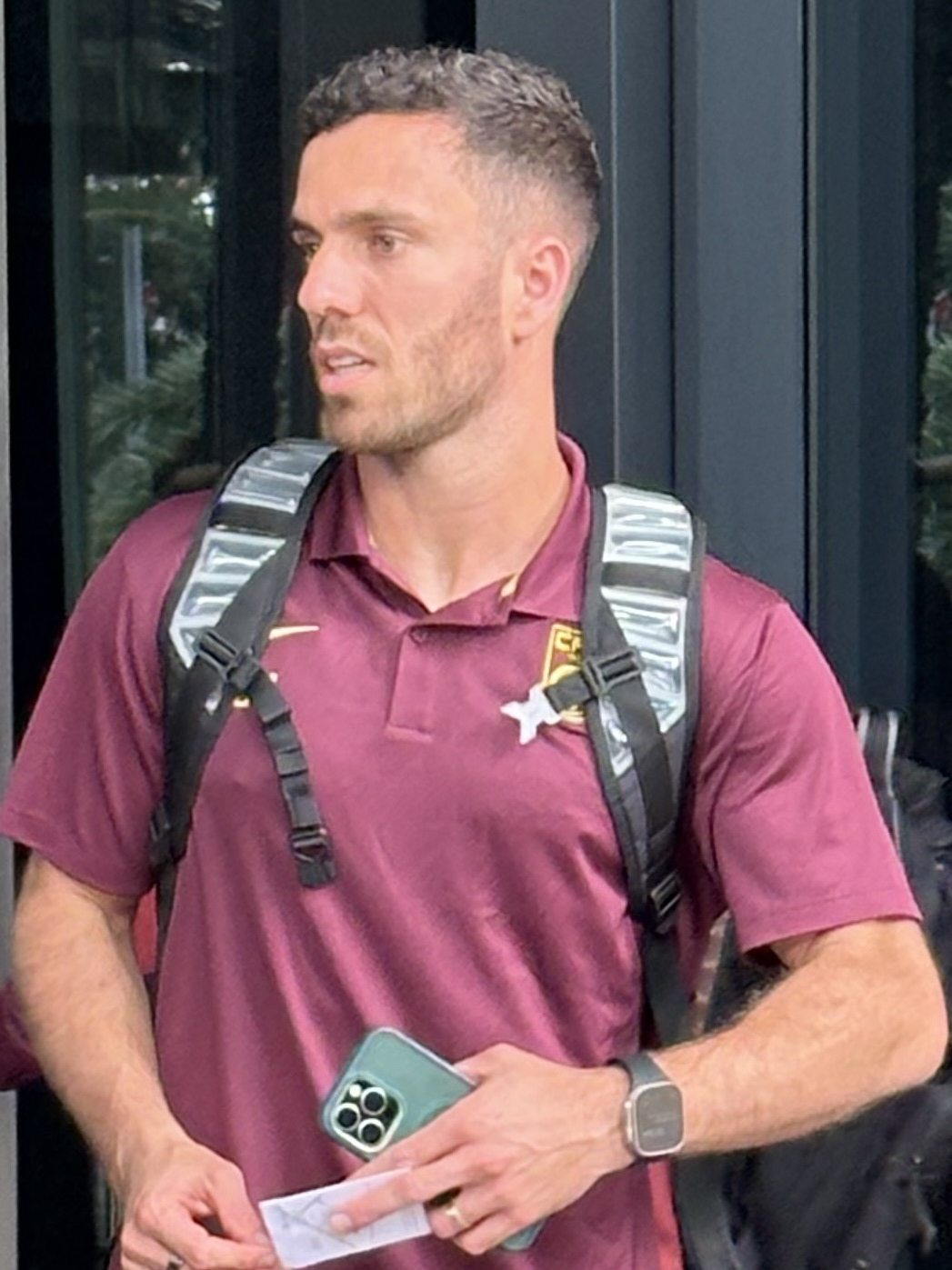
- Serginho in June 2025

Personal information
- Full name: Sai Erjini'ao
- Birth name: Sérgio Antônio Soler de Oliveira Júnior
- Date of birth: 15 March 1995 (age 31)
- Place of birth: Monte Aprazível, Brazil
- Height: 1.80 m (5 ft 11 in)
- Position: Attacking midfielder

Team information
- Current team: Beijing Guoan
- Number: 7

Youth career
- 2001–2008: SESC
- 2008–2011: São Paulo
- 2011–2015: Santos

Senior career*
Years	Team	Apps	(Gls)
2014–2018	Santos	29	(0)
2016	→ Vitória (loan)	16	(1)
2017	→ Santo André (loan)	0	(0)
2018	→ América Mineiro (loan)	12	(4)
2018–2019	Kashima Antlers	43	(15)
2020–2024	Changchun Yatai	96	(27)
2025–	Beijing Guoan	54	(13)

International career^{‡}
2025–	China	8	(1)
Medal record
Representing China
Men's football
EAFF Championship
Bronze medal – third place	2025 South Korea	Team
- * Club domestic league appearances and goals as of 19 November 2026 ‡ National team caps and goals as of 5 June 2026

Sérgio Antônio Soler de Oliveira Júnior (born 15 March 1995), commonly known as Serginho or Sai Erjini'ao (Chinese: 塞尔吉尼奥; pinyin: Sài Ěrjíní'ào) in China, is a professional footballer who plays as an attacking midfielder for Chinese Super League club Beijing Guoan. Born in Brazil, he plays for the China national team.

== Club career ==
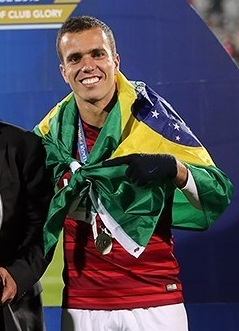
Serginho celebrating with Kashima Antlers after winning the 2018 AFC Champions League final.

Born in Monte Aprazível, São Paulo, Serginho joined Santos FC's youth setup in 2011, aged 15, after being released by rivals São Paulo FC due to a recurrent back injury. He soon earned plaudits for his performances with the under-20's, being a key midfield unit during the 2014 Copa São Paulo de Futebol Júnior winning campaign.

On 9 March 2014 Serginho made his first-team debut, coming on as a late substitute in a 4–1 home success over Oeste for the Campeonato Paulista championship. He made his Série A debut on 11 September, again from the bench in a 1–3 away loss against Sport Recife.

On 15 January 2016, Serginho renewed his contract – which was due to expire at the end of the year – until 2018. On 7 July, he was loaned to fellow top tier club Vitória until the end of the year.

Serginho scored his first professional goal 17 November 2016, netting Vitória's second in a 2–3 away loss against former club Santos. The following 17 February he moved to Santo André, on loan until the end of the 2017 Campeonato Paulista.

Upon returning, Serginho did not play a single minute until July 2017, in a 1–0 away win against Atlético Mineiro. He started to feature more regularly in late September, mainly used as a substitute.

On 23 January 2018, Serginho was loaned to fellow top tier club América Mineiro for one year. On 15 April, he scored a brace in a 3–0 home defeat of Sport.

On 29 July 2018, he moved to J1 League club Kashima Antlers. Serginho made an impressive appearance with Kashima in the 2018 AFC Champions League.

On 27 January 2025, Changchun Yatai announced that Serginho was released after the end of his contract.

=== Beijing Guoan ===
On 2 February 2025, fellow Chinese Super League side Beijing Guoan announced that Serginho has completed the transfer to the club. Serginho chose to wear the number 7 shirt. He debuted on 29 March 2025 in a 1–1 draw against Chengdu Rongcheng for the club in matchday 3 of Chinese Super League.

His first goal for the club, a header from a corner, came on 15 April 2025 in a 4–4 league draw against Wuhan Three Towns.

== International career ==
Although Serginho was born in Brazil, he did not represent the nation internationally at any level.

On 13 March 2025, Serginho became a naturalised citizen of China. He was subsequently called up by China national team in preparation for two of their 2026 FIFA World Cup qualifier matches against Saudi Arabia and Australia. He debuted for China on 25 March 2025 in a 0–2 lost to Australia in the 2026 FIFA World Cup qualifier. He came on as a substitute at half-time.

Serginho was called up to the China's squad for the 2025 EAFF E-1 Football Championship where he featured in all of the matches.

Serginho scored his first international goal on 5 June 2026 in a friendly against Singapore at the Jalan Besar Stadium.

== Career statistics ==
=== Club ===
As of 15 April 2025

Club	Season	League			State league		National cup (Note: Includes Copa do Brasil, Emperor's Cup, Chinese FA Cup)		League cup		Continental		Other		Total	
Club	Season	Division	Apps	Goals	Apps	Goals	Apps	Goals	Apps	Goals	Apps	Goals	Apps	Goals	Apps	Goals
Santos	2014	Série A	5	0	1	0	3	0	—		—		—		9	0
Santos	2015	Série A	10	0	0	0	3	0	—		—		—		13	0
Santos	2016	Série A	5	0	11	0	2	0	—		—		—		18	0
Santos	2017	Série A	9	0	—		—		—		—		—		9	0
Santos	Total		29	0	12	0	8	0	—		0	0	—		49	0
Vitória (loan)	2016	Série A	16	1	—		—		—		2	0	—		18	1
Santo André (loan)	2017	Paulista	—		13	0	—		—		—		—		13	0
América Mineiro (loan)	2018	Série A	12	4	10	1	2	2	—		—		—		24	7
Kashima Antlers	2018	J.League	10	3	—		3	0	4	2	6	5	—		23	10
Kashima Antlers	2019	J.League	33	12	—		4	2	2	0	11	6	3 (Note: Appearances in FIFA Club World Cup)	1	53	21
Kashima Antlers	Total		43	15	0	0	7	2	6	2	17	11	3	1	76	31
Changchun Yatai	2020	China League One	15	3	—		2	1	—		—		—		17	4
Changchun Yatai	2021	Chinese Super League	15	3	—		0	0	—		—		—		15	3
Changchun Yatai	2022	Chinese Super League	25	9	—		0	0	—		—		—		25	9
Changchun Yatai	2023	Chinese Super League	17	4	—		1	2	—		—		—		18	6
Changchun Yatai	2024	Chinese Super League	24	8	—		1	0	—		—		—		25	8
Changchun Yatai	Total		96	27	0	0	4	3	—		—		—		100	30
Beijing Guoan	2025	Chinese Super League	4	1	—		0	0	—		—		—		4	1
Career total			200	48	35	1	21	7	6	2	19	11	3	1	284	70

=== International ===
As of match played 4 June 2026.

Appearances and goals by national team and year
National team	Year	Apps	Goals
China	2025	6	0
China	2026	2	1
Total		8	1

=== International goals ===
No.	Date	Venue	Opponent	Score	Result	Competition
1.	5 June 2026	Jalan Besar Stadium, Kallang, Singapore	Singapore	1–0	2–1	Friendly

== Honours ==
Santos

- Campeonato Paulista: 2015, 2016
- Copa São Paulo de Futebol Júnior: 2014

Kashima Antlers

- AFC Champions League: 2018

Changchun Yatai

- China League One: 2020

Beijing Guoan

- Chinese FA Cup: 2025
- Chinese FA Super Cup: 2026
