= Kazuma Yamaguchi =

Japanese footballer

Kazuma Yamaguchi 山口 一真
Personal information
- Full name: Kazuma Yamaguchi
- Date of birth: January 17, 1996 (age 30)
- Place of birth: Tokyo, Japan
- Height: 1.75 m (5 ft 9 in)
- Position: Forward

Team information
- Current team: Thespa Gunma
- Number: 5

Youth career
- –2010: FC Tokyo Fukagawa
- 2011–2013: Yamanashi Gakuin Univ. High School

College career
Years	Team	Apps	(Gls)
2014–2017	Hannan University		

Senior career*
Years	Team	Apps	(Gls)
2018–2020	Kashima Antlers	45	(1)
2020	→ Mito HollyHock (loan)	35	(15)
2021–2025	Matsumoto Yamaga	50	(4)
2022–2023	→ Machida Zelvia (loan)	28	(1)
2025	→ Thespa Gunma (loan)	10	(2)
2026–	Thespa Gunma	0	(0)
Medal record
Kashima Antlers
Winner	AFC Champions League	2018
- * Club domestic league appearances and goals as of 28 January 2026

Kazuma Yamaguchi (山口 一真, Yamaguchi Kazuma; born January 17, 1996) is a Japanese football player for Thespa Gunma.

== Career ==
After graduating at Hannan University, where he shone and he was one of the best players of Kansai Student Football League, Yamaguchi signed for Kashima Antlers in January 2018. The young striker even had the opportunity of a trial at Fortuna Düsseldorf. On the first game in J1 League against Nagoya Grampus, Yamaguchi even found an assist.

== Club statistics ==
Updated to 1 January 2020.

Club performance			League		Cup		League		Continental		Total	
Season	Club	League	Apps	Goals	Apps	Goals	Apps	Goals	Apps	Goals	Apps	Goals
Japan			League		Emperor's Cup		J. League Cup		AFC		Total	
2018	Kashima Antlers	J1 League	10	1	1	0	2	0	3	0	16	1
2019	Kashima Antlers	J1 League	7	0	3	1	0	0	7	0	17	1
Total			17	1	4	1	2	0	10	0	33	1
