= Taichi Nakamura (footballer) =

Japanese footballer

Personal information
- Date of birth: 5 January 1993 (age 33)
- Place of birth: Shizuoka, Japan
- Height: 1.72 m (5 ft 8 in)
- Position: Midfielder

Team information
- Current team: Vanraure Hachinohe
- Number: 7

Youth career
- Tokoha Gakuen Tachibana HS
- 2011–2014: Niigata University of Management

Senior career*
Years	Team	Apps	(Gls)
2015–2017	ReinMeer Aomori	49	(18)
2018–	Vanraure Hachinohe	79	(17)
- * Club domestic league appearances and goals as of 17:04, 12 November 2020 (UTC)

Taichi Nakamura (中村 太一, Nakamura Taichi; born 5 January 1993) is a Japanese footballer currently playing as a midfielder for Vanraure Hachinohe.

== Career statistics ==
=== Club ===
As of 12 November 2019.

Club	Season	League			National Cup		League Cup		Other		Total	
Club	Season	Division	Apps	Goals	Apps	Goals	Apps	Goals	Apps	Goals	Apps	Goals
ReinMeer Aomori	2016	JFL	27	7	0	0	–		0	0	27	7
ReinMeer Aomori	2017	JFL	22	11	0	0	–		0	0	22	11
ReinMeer Aomori	Total		49	18	0	0	0	0	0	0	49	18
Vanraure Hachinohe	2018	JFL	29	8	0	0	–		0	0	29	8
Vanraure Hachinohe	2019	J3 League	32	6	3 (Note: Appearances in the Emperor's Cup)	2	–		0	0	35	8
Vanraure Hachinohe	2020	J3 League	18	3	0	0	–		0	0	18	3
Vanraure Hachinohe	Total		79	17	3	2	0	0	0	0	82	19
Career total			128	35	3	2	0	0	0	0	131	37
