= Toya Nakamura =

Japanese footballer

Toya Nakamura 中村 桐耶
Personal information
- Full name: Toya Nakamura
- Date of birth: July 23, 2000 (age 26)
- Place of birth: Hokkaido, Japan
- Height: 1.86 m (6 ft 1 in)
- Position: Centre back

Team information
- Current team: Hokkaido Consadole Sapporo
- Number: 6

Youth career
- 2007–2009: Mukawa FC
- 2010–2012: Hokkaido Consadole Sapporo
- 2013–2015: ASC Hokkaido
- 2016–2018: Hokkaido Consadole Sapporo

Senior career*
| Years | Team | Apps | (Gls) |
| 2018– | Hokkaido Consadole Sapporo | 97 | (1) |
| 2019–2020 | → Honda FC (loan) | 17 | (0) |
- * Club domestic league appearances and goals as of 1 January 2026

Toya Nakamura (中村 桐耶, Nakamura Tōya; born July 23, 2000) is a Japanese professional footballer who plays as a centre back for J2 League club Hokkaido Consadole Sapporo.

== Early life ==
Nakamura was born in Hokkaido and played youth football with Hokkaido Consadole Sapporo before starting his professional career with their senior team in 2018.

== Career ==
After his loan spell at Honda FC, Nakamura continued back with Consadole Sapporo from the 2021 season. He made his debut for Consadole against Kyoto Sanga on 7 May 2022. Nakamura scored his first goal for the club on 10 June 2023, scoring in the 43rd minute against Sagan Tosu.

== Career statistics ==
As of match played 18 March 2022

Appearances and goals by club, season and competition
| Club | Season | League | | | National cup | | League cup | | Total | |
| Club | Season | Division | Apps | Goals | Apps | Goals | Apps | Goals | Apps | Goals |
| Japan | | | League | | Emperor's Cup | | J. League Cup | | Total | |
|---|---|---|---|---|---|---|---|---|---|---|
| Hokkaido Consadole Sapporo | 2018 | J1 League | 0 | 0 | 0 | 0 | 3 | 0 | 3 | 0 |
| Hokkaido Consadole Sapporo | 2019 | J1 League | 0 | 0 | 1 | 1 | 3 | 0 | 4 | 1 |
| Hokkaido Consadole Sapporo | 2021 | J1 League | 0 | 0 | 2 | 0 | 3 | 0 | 5 | 0 |
| Hokkaido Consadole Sapporo | 2022 | J1 League | 0 | 0 | 0 | 0 | 2 | 0 | 2 | 0 |
| Hokkaido Consadole Sapporo | Total | | 0 | 0 | 3 | 1 | 11 | 0 | 14 | 1 |
| Honda FC (loan) | 2019 | JFL | 9 | 0 | 0 | 0 | – | | 9 | 0 |
| Honda FC (loan) | 2020 | JFL | 8 | 0 | 2 | 0 | – | | 10 | 0 |
| Honda FC (loan) | Total | | 17 | 0 | 2 | 0 | 0 | 0 | 19 | 0 |
| Career total | | | 17 | 0 | 5 | 1 | 11 | 0 | 33 | 1 |
