= Hokkaido Consadole Sapporo =

Association football club in Japan

Hokkaido Consadole Sapporo 北海道コンサドーレ札幌
- Full name: Hokkaido Consadole Sapporo
- Nickname: Consa
- Founded: 1935; 91 years ago as Toshiba Horikawa-cho SC
- Stadium: Sapporo Dome Daiwa House PREMIST DOME
- Capacity: 38,794
- Owner(s): Isao Ishimizu (11.4%); Ishiya (9.5%)
- Chairman: Hajime Ishimizu
- Manager: Kenta Kawai
- League: J2 League
- 2025: J2 League, 12th of 20
- Website: www.consadole-sapporo.jp
Home colours	Away colours

Hokkaido Consadole Sapporo (北海道コンサドーレ札幌, Hokkaidō Konsadōre Sapporo) is a Japanese professional football club based in Sapporo, on the island of Hokkaido. They will play in the 2025 J2 League, the second tier league of Japanese football, after relegation from the J1 League at conclusion of the 2024 season.

Their main home ground is the indoor Sapporo Dome, which was shared with the Hokkaido Nippon-Ham Fighters baseball team until 2022. Some matches are also played at the outdoor Sapporo Atsubetsu Stadium.

== Name origin ==
The club's name "Consadole" is a combination of consado, a reverse of the Japanese word Dosanko (道産子; meaning "people of Hokkaido") and the Spanish expression Olé.

== History ==
=== Toshiba S.C. (1935–1995) ===
Consadole's club tradition dates back to 1935 when Toshiba Horikawa-cho Soccer Club was founded in Kawasaki, Kanagawa. They were promoted to the now-defunct Japan Soccer League Division 2 in 1978. They adopted new name Toshiba Soccer Club in 1980 and were promoted to the JSL Division 1 in 1989. Their highest placement, 4th in the 1990 and 1991 seasons. Relegating themselves as they were not ready for J.League implementation, they joined the newly formed Japan Football League in 1992 and played the last season as Toshiba S.C. in 1995.

They sought to be a professional club, but the owner Toshiba did not regard Kawasaki as an ideal hometown. This was because Verdy Kawasaki, one of the most prominent clubs at that time, was also based in the city, which Toshiba apparently believed was not big enough to accommodate two clubs. (Verdy has since crossed the Tama River to be based in Chōfu City in the west of Tokyo and has been renamed as Tokyo Verdy 1969; the only remaining professional club is Kawasaki Frontale, originally part of Fujitsu.)

They decided to move to Sapporo where the local government and community had been keen to provide a base for a professional soccer team as they awaited Daiwa House Premist Dome to be completed in 2001. The ownership was transferred from Toshiba to Hokkaido Football Club plc. before the start of the 1996 season.

Toshiba does not have financial interest in the club any more but Consadole still boasts their forerunner's red and black colours on their uniform. The colours were an idea from then-player Nobuhiro Ishizaki (who played when the team was still based in Kawasaki and later coached them in Sapporo) who was a fan of A.C. Milan. It also became the symbol of Toshiba's sports teams such as Toshiba Brave Lupus Tokyo.

=== Consadole Sapporo (1996–2015) ===
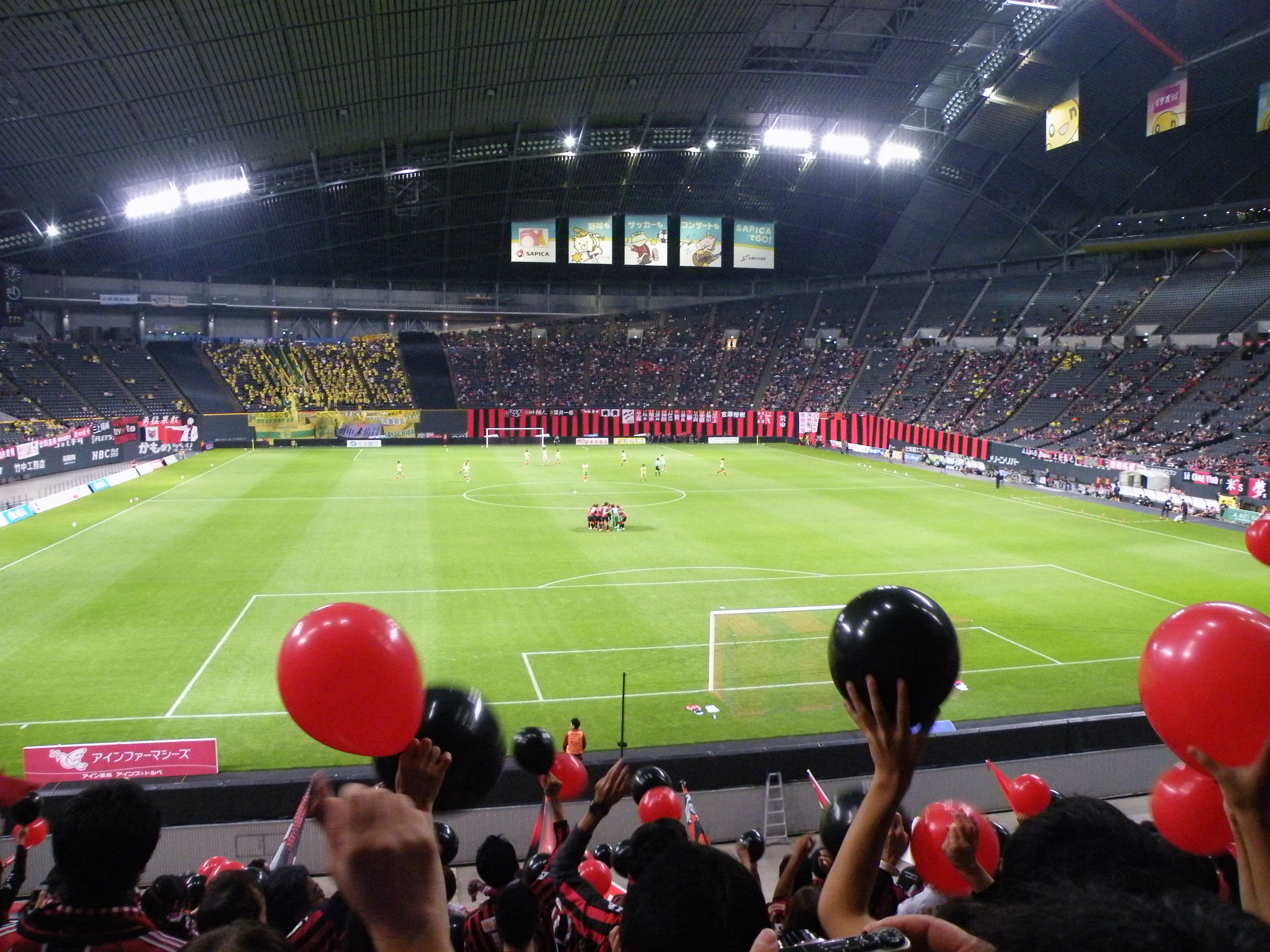
Daiwa House Premist Dome, Consa's home ground

Consadole Sapporo inherited the JFL status from Toshiba S.C.. Their debut season in 1996 was not overly successful as they finished 5th and missed promotion. However, they won the JFL championship in 1997 and were promoted to J.League.

In 1998, their first J.League season saw them finish 14th out of 18 but this did not guarantee them staying up. From the 1999 season, the J.League had 2 divisions and the play-offs involving five teams (four J.League sides and the champions of the JFL) were to be played. In order to decide who were involved in the play-offs, not only the results of the 1998 season but also those of the 1997 were taken account of. Consadole, who did not play in the previous season, was placed 14th in the aggregate standing and despite finishing above Gamba Osaka (who had finished fourth in 1997), was forced to face the play-offs. They lost all four games, two against Vissel Kobe, and another two against Avispa Fukuoka, and became the first-ever J.League side that experienced relegation.

In 1999, Takeshi Okada, the former Japan national team coach, was appointed as head coach in an effort to make an immediate comeback to J1, but this attempt failed as they finished 5th. Their heavy investment on players counted against them and, at this point, the debt owed by the club exceeded three billion yen (US$33 million). The bankruptcy looked a near-certainty.

In 2000, they cut costs dramatically. As a result, the team often included as many as eight on-loan players in the starting line-up. However, this strategy paid off and the club won the J2 championship as well as promotion to J1. The club posted a single-year profit for the first time in their history this year.

In 2001, they finished 11th in J1. However, at the end of the season, the club failed to persuade Okada to renew the contract and several leading players also left the club. In 2002, they finished bottom and were relegated to J2 for a second time.

In 2003, they again tried to return to the top-flight immediately by investing heavily but the team didn't perform well on the pitch. They finished ninth and their debt again crossed the 3-billion-yen mark.

The deficit-ridden club realized they needed a drastic restructuring and released highly paid leading players including mainstay Yasuyuki Konno. The rejuvenated but inexperienced team finished bottom of J2 in 2004. The bright side was their improved financial situation where the debt was sharply reduced to less than 100 million yen.

In 2005 and 2006, they finished sixth. In 2006 they also reached the semi-finals of the Emperor's Cup, 15 years after reaching the semi-finals in Kawasaki–the furthest they've reached in the Cup. In 2007 they finally earned promotion as champions and play in J1 in the 2008 season.

A loss on October 19, 2008, confirmed Sapporo's relegation to J2 for the 2009 season, overtaking Kyoto Sanga as the league's most relegated side. Having won the Japanese second-tier championship a record five times (including two JSL Second Divisions as Toshiba, and one former JFL title), they were promoted to Division One after finishing third in 2011. However, a torrid 2012 season ended with Consadole holding the highest goals conceded per game ratio, the worst points per game ratio and the highest loss percentage in J.League history as they were relegated after just 27 matches played, making the 2012 team one of the worst to have ever featured in the top division. From the 2016 season, the club has adopted the new name as "Hokkaido Consadole Sapporo".

=== Hokkaido Consadole Sapporo (2016–present) ===
In 2016, the club changed its name to Hokkaido Consadole Sapporo. After four years spent at the J2, Hokkaido Consadole Sapporo returned to the J1 ahead of the 2017 season, having been promoted as 2016 J2 League champions.

On 9 February 2018, the team won the inaugural Pacific Rim Cup tournament in Honolulu, Hawaii, defeating the Vancouver Whitecaps 1–0. 2018 was the season they reached their highest placing in the J.League era and in Sapporo – 4th, 27 years after achieving the same place in Kawasaki.

In January 2022, Hokkaido Consadole Sapporo's Thai player Chanathip Songkrasin who was part of the 2018 J.League Best XI joined Kawasaki Frontale with a transfer fee of around $3.8 million, breaking the J.League record for the highest domestic transfer.

On 1 December 2024, after seven years in the top flight, Hokkaido Consadole Sapporo got relegated to the J2 League.

== In popular culture ==
In the Captain Tsubasa manga series, two characters were from Hokkaido Consadole Sapporo, midfielder Hikaru Matsuyama (himself a Hokkaido native) and forward Kazumasa Oda. In 2017, Matsuyama became an Hokkaido Consadole Sapporo player, given a squad number, 36, and is also an official ambassador of the team from Hokkaido.

== Mascot ==
Hokkaido Consadole Sapporo's mascot is Dole Kun, an anthropomorphic Shima Fukurou (or Blakiston's fish owl). The owl was chosen as not only was it on Consa's crest, but also because it is the largest owl in Japan, and it also lives in Hokkaido. He also enjoys having hot baths sometimes. He also is friends with Frep the Fox and Polly Polaris, the mascots of the Hokkaido Nippon-Ham Fighters, which can be attributed because the Fighters and Consa share the same stadium.

== Current players ==
As of 16 September 2026.

Note: Flags indicate national team as defined under FIFA eligibility rules; some limited exceptions apply. Players may hold more than one non-FIFA nationality.

No.	Pos.	Nation	Player
1	GK	JPN	Takanori Sugeno
2	DF	JPN	Ryu Takao
3	DF	KOR	Park Min-gyu
4	DF	JPN	Toya Nakamura
5	DF	JPN	Akito Fukumori
7	MF	THA	Supachok Sarachat
9	FW	BRA	Mario Sérgio
10	MF	JPN	Hiroki Miyazawa
11	MF	JPN	Ryota Aoki
13	MF	JPN	Yuki Horigome
14	MF	JPN	Katsuyuki Tanaka
16	MF	JPN	Tatsuya Hasegawa
17	DF	JPN	Mizuki Uchida
18	MF	JPN	Shuma Kido
19	MF	THA	Teerapat Pruetong (on loan from BG Pathum United)
20	FW	SLE	Amadou Bakayoko
22	FW	GHA	Kinglord Safo
23	FW	JPN	Shingo Omori
24	GK	JPN	Tomoki Tagawa (on loan from Yokohama F. Marinos)

No.	Pos.	Nation	Player
25	DF	JPN	Leo Osaki
27	MF	JPN	Takuma Arano
29	DF	KOR	Kim Geon-woong
30	MF	JPN	Renji Sarada ^{DSP}
31	MF	JPN	Yuto Horigome
34	MF	JPN	Kaito Konomi (on loan from Cerezo Osaka)
35	MF	JPN	Kosuke Hara
38	FW	JPN	Shoji Toyama (on loan from Gamba Osaka)
39	DF	JPN	Hayato Kawahara
40	FW	JPN	Yosei Sato
41	GK	JPN	Kakuma Tadano
43	DF	JPN	Shoya Nose
47	DF	JPN	Shota Nishino
50	DF	JPN	Niki Urakami
51	GK	JPN	Shun Takagi
55	DF	JPN	Ryunosuke Umetsu ^{DSP}
70	FW	BRA	Vini Peixoto (on loan from Shimizu S-Pulse)
71	FW	JPN	Haruto Shirai
79	FW	THA	Itthimon Tippanet (on loan from BG Pathum United)

=== Out on loan ===
Note: Flags indicate national team as defined under FIFA eligibility rules; some limited exceptions apply. Players may hold more than one non-FIFA nationality.

No.	Pos.	Nation	Player
—	GK	JPN	Kojiro Nakano (at AC Nagano Parceiro)
—	MF	JPN	Yuto Hayashida (at Verspah Oita)

No.	Pos.	Nation	Player
—	FW	JPN	Shido Izuma (at Thespa Gunma)
—	MF	JPN	Kosuke Hara (at Giravanz Kitakyushu)

- Past (and present) players who are the subjects of Wikipedia articles can be found here

== Coaching staff ==
For the 2025 season.

Position	Staff
Manager	(Japan) Kenta Kawai
Assistant managers	(Japan) Yasuyuki Akaike
Assistant coaches	(Japan) Kenta Togawa (Japan) Makoto Sunakawa
Goalkeeping coaches	(Japan) Osamu Sasaki (Japan) Yuya Hikichi
Performance coordinator	(Japan) Yosuke Kuotani
Physical coach	(Japan) Osamu Yamada
Set-piece coach & analyst	(Japan) Watabiki Daimu
Analyst	(Japan) Kentaro Nakanishi
Trainer	(Japan) Kazuhiro Sagawa
Athletic trainer	(Japan) Seiichi Iwasa (Japan) Takuma Morinaga
Sub-manager & equipe	(Japan) Ren Sato
Equipe	(Japan) Yuta Aikawa
Sub-manager & interpreter	(South Korea) Lee Sung-ju
Interpreter	(Japan) Nakajima Farang Issei (Thailand) Narit Jampalee

== Record as J.League member ==
Champions	Runners-up	Third place	Promoted	Relegated

League					J.League Cup	Emperor's Cup
Season	Div.	Teams	Pos.	Attendance/G	J.League Cup	Emperor's Cup
1998	J1	18	14th	11,953	Group stage	4th round
1999	J2	10	5th	10,986	1st round	3rd round
2000	J2	11	1st	12,910	1st round	4th round
2001	J1	16	11th	22,228	Group stage	3rd round
2002	J1	16	16th	19,140	Group stage	3rd round
2003	J2	12	9th	10,766	Not eligible	3rd round
2004	J2	12	12th	9,466	Not eligible	Quarterfinal
2005	J2	12	6th	11,133	Not eligible	3rd round
2006	J2	13	6th	10,478	Not eligible	Semifinal
2007	J2	13	1st	12,112	Not eligible	3rd round
2008	J1	18	18th	14,547	Group stage	4th round
2009	J2	18	6th	10,207	Not eligible	3rd round
2010	J2	19	13th	10,738	Not eligible	3rd round
2011	J2	20	3rd	10,482	Not eligible	2nd round
2012	J1	18	18th	12,008	Group stage	2nd round
2013	J2	22	8th	10,075	Not eligible	4th round
2014	J2	22	10th	11,060	Not eligible	3rd round
2015	J2	22	10th	11,960	Not eligible	3rd round
2016	J2	22	1st	14,559	Not eligible	2nd round
2017	J1	18	11th	18,418	Play-off stage	2nd round
2018	J1	18	4th	17,222	Group stage	4th round
2019	J1	18	10th	18,768	Runners-up	2nd round
2020 †	J1	18	12th	4,303	Quarter-finals	Did not qualify
2021 †	J1	20	10th	6,816	Quarter-finals	3rd round
2022	J1	18	10th	12,215	Play-off stage	3rd round
2023	J1	18	12th	14,254	Quarter-finals	Round of 16
2024	J1	20	19th	17,086	Quarter-finals	Round of 16
2025	J2	20	12th	14,469	1st round	2nd round
2026	J2	40	8th	10,239	N/A	N/A
2026-27	J2	20	TBD		TBD	TBD

Key

- Pos.. = Position in league
- Attendance/G= Average home league attendance
- † 2020, 2021 seasons attendance reduced by COVID-19 worldwide pandemic.
- Source: J. League Data Site

== Honours ==
Hokkaido Consadole Sapporo honours
Honour	No.	Years
All Japan Senior Football Championship	1	1977
Japan Soccer League (Second tier)	2	1979, 1988–89,
JSL Cup	1	1981 (shared with Mitsubishi Motors)
Japan Football League	1	1997
J2 League	3	2000, 2007, 2016

== Managerial history ==
Manager	Nationality	Tenure	
Manager	Nationality	Start	Finish
Tadao Onishi	Japan	1 February 1981	31 January 1986
Takeo Takahashi	Japan	1 February 1987	1 February 1997
Hugo Fernández	Uruguay	1 February 1997	18 October 1998
Hajime Ishii	Japan	19 October 1998	31 January 1999
Takeshi Okada	Japan	1 February 1999	31 January 2002
Tetsuji Hashiratani	Japan	1 February 2002	31 May 2002
Radmilo Ivančević	Federal Republic of Yugoslavia	1 June 2002	16 September 2002
Chang Woe-ryong	South Korea	16 September 2002	31 January 2003
João Carlos	Brazil	1 February 2003	4 August 2003
Chang Woe-ryong	South Korea	5 August 2003	31 January 2004
Masaaki Yanagishita	Japan	1 February 2004	31 January 2007
Toshiya Miura	Japan	1 February 2007	31 January 2009
Nobuhiro Ishizaki	Japan	1 February 2009	31 January 2013
Keiichi Zaizen	Japan	1 February 2013	27 August 2014
Yoshihiro Natsuka	Japan	28 August 2014	6 September 2014
Ivica Barbarić	Bosnia and Herzegovina	7 September 2014	24 July 2015
Shuhei Yomoda	Japan	24 July 2015	31 January 2018
Mihailo Petrović	Serbia	1 February 2018	31 January 2025
Daiki Iwamasa	Japan	1 February 2025	10 August 2025
Shingo Shibata	Japan	11 August 2025	

== Kit evolution ==
Home Kits - 1st
1997 - 1998	1999 - 2000	2001 - 2002	2003 - 2004	2005
2006	2007 - 2008	2009	2010	2011
2012	2013	2014	2015	2016
2017	2018	2019	2020	2021
2022	2023	2024	2025 -	

Away Kits - 2nd
1997 - 1998	1999 - 2000	2001	2002 - 2003	2004 - 2005
2006	2007	2008	2009	2010 - 2011
2012	2013	2014	2015	2016
2017	2018	2019	2020	2021
2022	2023	2024	2025 -	

Special Kits - 3rd
2016; 20th Hakodate Commemorative	2018; Hokkaido naming 150th anniversary	2020 3rd	2021 3rd	2021; 25th Anniversary
2022 3rd	2023 3rd	2024 3rd	2025 3rd	

== Affiliated clubs ==
- (Thailand) Khon Kaen (March 2013−)
- (Vietnam) Long An (March 2013−)
- (Malaysia) Johor Darul Ta'zim (April 2016−)
- (Belgium) Sint-Truidense VV (April 2019−)
- (Thailand) Buriram United (June 2022−)
- (Indonesia) Persipura Jayapura (June 2023−)
- (Italy) AC Milan (March 2024−)
