= 2022 Kashima Antlers season =

Kashima Antlers
2022 season
- Chairman: Fumiaki Koizumi
- Manager: René Weiler (until 7 August); Daiki Iwamasa (from 8 August)
- Stadium: Kashima Soccer Stadium
- J1 League: 4th
- Emperor's Cup: Semi finals
- J.League Cup: Play-off stage
- Top goalscorer: League: Ayase Ueda (10 goals); All: Ayase Ueda (14 goals)
- Highest home attendance: 37,144 (v. Urawa Reds, J1 League, 21 May 2022)
- Lowest home attendance: 2,670 (v. Niigata University HWSC, Emperor's Cup, 1 June 2022)
- Average home league attendance: 16,160
Home colours	Away colours

The 2022 season was Kashima Antlers' 30th consecutive season in the J1 League, the top flight of Japanese football since the introduction of professional football in 1993. The club finished the 2022 J1 League in fourth place, exactly the same position as the previous season. They also competed in the Emperor's Cup where they reached the semi-finals and the J.League Cup where they were knocked out at the play-off stage.

Kashima started the league season strongly winning six of their first seven games and were in first position for a number of weeks before the end of May. Forward Ayase Ueda was in fine form and won the first J.League Monthly MVP award of the season. From May onwards, the performances started to detioriate and wins became hard to come by. Following the departure of top-scorer Ueda to Cercle Brugge at the start of July, scoring goals also became difficult and by August following two consecutive defeats, Kashima decided to part ways with manager René Weiler after only a few months in the post. Daiki Iwamasa took over as manager and in spite of only winning two of his ten league games in charge, led Kashima to a fourth-place finish.

Kashima had a good run in the Emperor's Cup, but would have hoped to have been finalists following defeat at the semi-final stage by J2 League club and eventual winners Ventforet Kofu. Yuma Suzuki was their top scorer in the competition with two goals.

== Squad ==
All players ages displayed below shows their age at the first match of the J1 League season, on 19 February 2022.

=== Season squad ===
Squad no.	Name	Nationality	Position(s)	Date of birth (age at start of season)
Goalkeepers
1	Kwoun Sun-tae	(South Korea)	GK	11 September 1984 (aged 37)
29	Tomoki Hayakawa	(Japan)	GK	3 March 1999 (aged 22)
31	Yuya Oki	(Japan)	GK	22 August 1999 (aged 22)
38	Taiki Yamada	(Japan)	GK	8 January 2002 (aged 20)
Defenders
2	Koki Anzai	(Japan)	RB / LB	31 May 1995 (aged 26)
5	Ikuma Sekigawa	(Japan)	CB	13 September 2000 (aged 21)
15	Bueno	(Brazil)	CB	24 August 1995 (aged 26)
16	Itsuki Oda	(Japan)	RB	16 July 1998 (aged 23)
20	Kim Min-tae	(South Korea)	CB	26 November 1993 (aged 28)
22	Rikuto Hirose	(Japan)	RB	23 September 1995 (aged 26)
23	Naoki Hayashi	(Japan)	CB	9 June 1998 (aged 23)
28	Shuhei Mizoguchi	(Japan)	LB	13 February 2004 (aged 18)
32	Keigo Tsunemoto	(Japan)	RB / CB	21 October 1998 (aged 23)
Midfielders
6	Kento Misao	(Japan)	DM / CB	16 April 1996 (aged 25)
10	Ryotaro Araki	(Japan)	AM / FW	29 January 2002 (aged 20)
11	Ryuji Izumi	(Japan)	LM / RW	6 November 1993 (aged 28)
14	Yuta Higuchi	(Japan)	RM / CM	30 October 1996 (aged 25)
17	Arthur Caíke	(Brazil)	LW / FW	15 June 1992 (aged 29)
21	Diego Pituca	(Brazil)	CM	15 August 1992 (aged 29)
24	Yusuke Ogawa	(Japan)	DM / CM	14 April 2002 (aged 19)
27	Yuta Matsumura	(Japan)	RM / LM	13 April 2001 (aged 20)
30	Shintaro Nago	(Japan)	CM / AM	17 April 1996 (aged 25)
33	Hayato Nakama	(Japan)	LM / AM	16 May 1992 (aged 29)
34	Yu Funabashi	(Japan)	DM	12 July 2002 (aged 19)
35	Ryotaro Nakamura	(Japan)	DM	27 September 1997 (aged 24)
Forwards
8	Shoma Doi (c)	(Japan)	SS / LW / RW	21 May 1992 (aged 29)
9	Everaldo	(Brazil)	FW	5 July 1991 (aged 30)
19	Blessing Eleke	(Nigeria)	FW	5 March 1996 (aged 25)
40	Yuma Suzuki	(Japan)	FW	28 April 1996 (aged 25)

Last updated: 31 July 2022.
Source: Kashima Antlers website

== Transfers ==
=== Arrivals ===
Date	Position	Player	From	Type	Source
17 December 2021	DF	(Japan) Itsuki Oda	(Japan) JEF United Chiba	Return from loan	
18 December 2021	MF	(Japan) Hayato Nakama	(Japan) Kashiwa Reysol	Full	
24 December 2021	DF	(South Korea) Kim Min-tae	(Japan) Hokkaido Consadole Sapporo	Full	
25 December 2021	MF	(Japan) Yuta Higuchi	(Japan) Sagan Tosu	Full	
28 December 2021	MF	(Japan) Ryotaro Nakamura	(Japan) Ventforet Kofu	Full	
28 December 2021	MF	(Japan) Shintaro Nago	(Japan) Shonan Bellmare	Return from loan	
3 January 2022	FW	(Japan) Yuma Suzuki	(Belgium) Sint-Truiden	Full	
1 August 2022	FW	(Nigeria) Blessing Eleke	(Belgium) Beerschot	Full	

=== Departures ===
Date	Position	Player	To	Type	Source
14 December 2021	MF	(Japan) Kotaro Arima	(Japan) Iwaki FC	Full	
17 December 2021	DF	(Japan) Tatsuki Nara	(Japan) Avispa Fukuoka	Full	
17 December 2021	DF	(Japan) Katsuya Nagato	(Japan) Yokohama F. Marinos	Full	
18 December 2021	MF	(Brazil) Léo Silva	(Japan) Nagoya Grampus	Full	
22 December 2021	MF	(Japan) Ryota Nagaki	(Japan) Shonan Bellmare	Full	
25 December 2021	MF	(Japan) Yasushi Endo	(Japan) Vegalta Sendai	Full	
25 December 2021	DF	(Japan) Tomoya Inukai	(Japan) Urawa Red Diamonds	Full	
27 December 2021	MF	(Japan) Ryōhei Shirasaki	(Japan) Shimizu S-Pulse	Full	
27 December 2021	DF	(Japan) Shogo Sasaki	(Japan) JEF United Chiba	Full	
1 January 2022	DF	(Japan) Koki Machida	(Belgium) Union SG	Loan	
1 February 2022	FW	(Japan) Yuki Kakita	(Japan) Sagan Tosu	Loan	
1 February 2022	MF	(Japan) Naoki Suto	(Japan) Zweigen Kanazawa	Loan	
1 July 2022	FW	(Japan) Ayase Ueda	(Belgium) Cercle Brugge	Full	
17 July 2022	FW	(Japan) Itsuki Someno	(Japan) Tokyo Verdy	Loan	
31 July 2022	MF	(Brazil) Juan Alano	(Japan) Gamba Osaka	Full	

== Pre-season and friendlies ==
Kashima played one pre-season friendly as part of the Ibaraki Soccer Festival against their Ibaraki neighbours Mito Hollyhock.

Win Draw Loss Fixtures

13 February 2022	Kashima Antlers	0–1	Mito Hollyhock	Kashima
14:03 JST		Report	Kinoshita 53'	Stadium: Kashima Soccer Stadium; Attendance: 6,374; Referee: Tomohiro Inoue

== Competitions ==
=== Overview ===
Competition	First match	Last match	Starting round	Final position	Record							
Competition	First match	Last match	Starting round	Final position	Pld	W	D	L	GF	GA	GD	Win %
J1 League	18 February 2022	5 November 2022	Matchday 1	4th	34	13	13	8	47	42	+5	38.24
J.League Cup	2 March 2022	11 June 2022	Group stage	Play-off stage	8	5	1	2	18	9	+9	62.50
Emperor's Cup	1 June 2022	5 October 2022	Second round	Semi-finals	5	4	0	1	8	2	+6	80.00
Total					47	22	14	11	73	53	+20	46.81

Source: Competitions

=== J1 League ===
Pos	Team	Pld	W	D	L	GF	GA	GD	Pts	Qualification or relegation
2	Kawasaki Frontale	34	20	6	8	65	42	+23	66	Qualification for the AFC Champions League group stage
3	Sanfrecce Hiroshima	34	15	10	9	52	41	+11	55	
4	Kashima Antlers	34	13	13	8	47	42	+5	52	
5	Cerezo Osaka	34	13	12	9	46	40	+6	51	
6	FC Tokyo	34	14	7	13	46	43	+3	49	

Source: J.League Data Site
Rules for classification: 1) Points; 2) Goal difference; 3) Goals scored; 4) Head-to-head points; 5) Head-to-head goal difference; 6) Head-to-head goals scored; 7) Fewer disciplinary points.

==== Results by matchday ====
Round	1	2	3	4	5	6	7	8	9	10	11	12	13	14	15	16	17	18	19	20	21	22	23	24	25	26	27	28	29	30	31	32	33	34
Ground	A	H	H	A	H	H	A	H	H	A	H	A	H	A	H	A	H	A	A	H	A	H	A	H	H	A	A	H	A	A	H	A	A	H
Result	W	L	W	W	W	W	W	L	D	W	W	L	W	D	D	L	W	D	W	D	D	D	L	L	W	D	L	D	D	D	L	D	W	D
Position	1	7	4	4	3	3	1	3	2	1	1	1	1	2	1	2	2	2	2	2	2	2	2	5	2	3	4	4	4	5	5	5	5	4

Updated to match(es) played on 5 November 2022. Source: J. League Data Site
A = Away; H = Home; W = Win; D = Draw; L = Loss

==== Results ====
19 February 2022 1	Gamba Osaka	1–3	Kashima Antlers	Suita
14:03 JST	Onose 26'; Patric (red card) 37'	Report	Ueda 20', 66'; Suzuki 30'	Stadium: Panasonic Stadium Suita; Attendance: 11,800; Referee: Yusuke Araki

26 February 2022 2	Kashima Antlers	0–2	Kawasaki Frontale	Kashima
15:03 JST		Report	Chinen 2'; Sasaki 17'	Stadium: Kashima Soccer Stadium; Attendance: 27,234; Referee: Koichiro Fukushima

6 March 2022 3	Kashima Antlers	1–0	Kashiwa Reysol	Kashima
15:03 JST	Pituca (yellow card) 14'; Kwoun (yellow card) 54'; Araki 65'	Report	Hosoya (yellow card) 11'; Ominami (yellow card) 78'; Toshima (yellow card) 90+5'	Stadium: Kashima Soccer Stadium; Attendance: 9,774; Referee: Hiroyuki Kimura

11 March 2022 4	Vissel Kobe	0–2	Kashima Antlers	Kobe
19:03 JST	Samper (yellow card) 90+7'	Report	Misao 7'; Doi (yellow card) 26'; Suzuki (yellow card) 41' (goal) 54'; Higuchi (yellow card) 46'; Pituca (yellow card) 52'	Stadium: Noevir Stadium Kobe; Attendance: 14,189; Referee: Akihiko Ikeuchi

19 March 2022 5	Kashima Antlers	2–1	Shonan Bellmare	Kashima
15:03 JST	Ueda 49'; Araki (yellow card) 53'; Alano 64'	Report	Segawa 16'; Tanaka (yellow card) 39'	Stadium: Kashima Soccer Stadium; Attendance: 10,251; Referee: Jumpei Iida

2 April 2022 6	Kashima Antlers	2–1	Shimizu S-Pulse	Kashima
16:03 JST	Pituca (yellow card) 56' (red card) 64'; Suzuki 78'; Ueda 90+3'; Araki (yellow card) 90+8'	Report	Kololli (yellow card) 56' (goal) 70'	Stadium: Kashima Soccer Stadium; Attendance: 11,037; Referee: Ryo Tanimoto

6 April 2022 7	Avispa Fukuoka	0–1	Kashima Antlers	Fukuoka
19:03 JST	Juanma (yellow card) 45+1'	Report	Suzuki (yellow card) 33'; Alano (yellow card) 47'; Ueda 71'	Stadium: Best Denki Stadium; Attendance: 4,751; Referee: Yoshiro Imamura

10 April 2022 8	Kashima Antlers	0–3	Yokohama F. Marinos	Kashima
15:03 JST		Report	Lopes 82'; Nishimura 89'; Misao 90+4' (o.g.)	Stadium: Kashima Soccer Stadium; Attendance: 17,646; Referee: Yuichi Nishimura

17 April 2022 9	Kashima Antlers	0–0	Nagoya Grampus	Kashima
15:03 JST	Caíke (yellow card) 34'; Misao (yellow card) 53'; Suzuki (yellow card) 66'	Report	Uchida (yellow card) 90+5'	Stadium: Kashima Soccer Stadium; Attendance: 11,410; Referee: Hajime Matsuo

29 April 2022 10	Cerezo Osaka	0–3	Kashima Antlers	Osaka
16:03 JST	Matsuda (yellow card) 48'	Report	Suzuki 6'; Matsumura 14'; Higuchi (yellow card) 74'; Caíke 90+1'	Stadium: Yodoko Sakura Stadium; Attendance: 9,883; Referee: Yudai Yamamoto

3 May 2022 11	Kashima Antlers	3−1	Júbilo Iwata	Kashima
15:03 JST	Caíke 29'; Ueda 35', 78'	Report	González 71'; Graça (yellow card) 85'	Stadium: Kashima Soccer Stadium; Attendance: 26,493; Referee: Hayato Shimizu

7 May 2022 12	Sanfrecce Hiroshima	3–0	Kashima Antlers	Hiroshima
14:03 JST	Kashiwa 38', 79'; Notsuda (yellow card) 41'; Mitsuta 63'; Santos (yellow card) 65'	Report	Hirose (yellow card) 69'	Stadium: Edion Stadium Hiroshima; Attendance: 8,730; Referee: Takuto Okabe

14 May 2022 13	Kashima Antlers	4–1	Hokkaido Consadole Sapporo	Kashima
15:03 JST	Ueda 6'; Suzuki 30' (pen.), 45+1'; Caíke 48'	Report	Miyazawa (yellow card) 9'; Sugeno (yellow card) 25'; Fernandes (yellow card) 55'; Suga 69'	Stadium: Kashima Soccer Stadium; Attendance: 11,438; Referee: Yusuke Araki

21 May 2022 14	Urawa Red Diamonds	1–1	Kashima Antlers	Saitama
17:03 JST	Scholz 44' (pen.)	Report	Caíke 6'	Stadium: Saitama Stadium 2002; Attendance: 37,144; Referee: Yuichi Nishimura

25 May 2022 15	Kashima Antlers	4–4	Sagan Tosu	Kashima
19:03 JST	Higuchi 52'; Ueda 68'; Doi 90+2'; Someno 90+4'	Report	Tashiro 31', 90+7'; Miyashiro 38'; Koizumi 49'	Stadium: Kashima Soccer Stadium; Attendance: 6,878; Referee: Koichiro Fukushima

29 May 2022 16	FC Tokyo	3–1	Kashima Antlers	Chōfu
15:03 JST	Watanabe 33', 42'; Oliveira 52' (pen.)	Report	Bueno (yellow card) 50'; Ueda 54'; Izumi (yellow card) 63'; Misao (yellow card) 67'; Suzuki (yellow card) 90+3'	Stadium: Ajinomoto Stadium; Attendance: 28,436; Referee: Hiroyuki Kimura

18 June 2022 17	Kashima Antlers	1−0	Kyoto Sanga	Kashima
18:03 JST	Anzai (yellow card) 30'; Caíke 50'	Report	Fukuoka (yellow card) 72'	Stadium: Kashima Soccer Stadium; Attendance: 12,179; Referee: Hayato Shimizu

26 June 2022 18	Nagoya Grampus	1−1	Kashima Antlers	Toyota
18:03 JST	Morishita (yellow card) 38'; Mateus 52' (pen.)	Report	Nakama 33'; Hirose (yellow card) 36'; Misao (yellow card) 45+2'	Stadium: Toyota Stadium; Attendance: 18,232; Referee: Yudai Yamamoto

2 July 2022 19	Kashiwa Reysol	1−2	Kashima Antlers	Kashiwa
18:33 JST	Kamijima (yellow card) 15'; Muto 63'	Report	Sekigawa (yellow card) 23'; Kim 45+2'; Everaldo 82' (pen.)	Stadium: Hitachidai; Attendance: 12,462; Referee: Hiroki Kasahara

6 July 2022 20	Kashima Antlers	3−3	Cerezo Osaka	Kashima
19:03 JST	Caíke 45+1'; Suzuki 52'; Everaldo 89'	Report	Kim 35' (o.g.); Matsuda (yellow card) 45'; Kato 70'; Patric 77'	Stadium: Kashima Soccer Stadium; Attendance: 8,217; Referee: Jumpei Iida

10 July 2022 21	Hokkaido Consadole Sapporo	0−0	Kashima Antlers	Sapporo
14:03 JST	Tanaka (yellow card) 66'	Report	Izumi (yellow card) 27'; Hirose (yellow card) 45'; Everaldo (yellow card) 46'	Stadium: Sapporo Dome; Attendance: 10,724; Referee: Ryuji Sato

16 July 2022 22	Kashima Antlers	1−1	Vissel Kobe	Kashima
18:04 JST	Everaldo (yellow card) 16'; Kim (yellow card) 44' (yellow-red card) 60'; Izumi 87'	Report	Osako 52'; Kobayashi (yellow card) 66'; Yamakawa (yellow card) 90'	Stadium: Kashima Soccer Stadium; Attendance: 20,602; Referee: Futoshi Nakamura

30 July 2022 23	Yokohama F. Marinos	2−0	Kashima Antlers	Yokohama
19:03 JST	Matsubara (yellow card) 29'; Élber 37'; Iwata 51'	Report	Caíke (yellow card) 26'	Stadium: Nissan Stadium; Attendance: 31,599; Referee: Ryo Tanimoto

6 August 2022 24	Kashima Antlers	0−2	Sanfrecce Hiroshima	Kashima
18:03 JST	Misao (yellow card) 90+5'	Report	Ben Khalifa (yellow card) 7'; Araki (yellow card) 40'; Fujii (yellow card) 45'; Kawamura 84'; Ezequiel 90+5'	Stadium: Kashima Soccer Stadium; Attendance: 19,745; Referee: Hayato Shimizu

14 August 2022 25	Kashima Antlers	2−0	Avispa Fukuoka	Kashima
18:03 JST	Hiratsuka 10' (o.g.); Nakama (yellow card) 48'; Pituca (yellow card) 83'; Nakamura (yellow card) 85'; Everaldo 90+3'	Report	Miya (yellow card) 32'; Grolli (yellow card) 44'	Stadium: Kashima Soccer Stadium; Attendance: 18,289; Referee: Koei Koya

21 August 2022 26	Shonan Bellmare	1−1	Kashima Antlers	Hiratsuka
19:03 JST	Segawa 74'; Yonemoto (yellow card) 90+5'	Report	Everaldo 59'	Stadium: Lemon Gas Stadium Hiratsuka; Attendance: 10,781; Referee: Yoshiro Imamura

27 August 2022 27	Kawasaki Frontale	2−1	Kashima Antlers	Kawasaki
19:03 JST	Ienaga 8' (pen.); Wakizaka 14'; Schmidt (yellow card) 26'; Tachibanada (yellow card) 68'	Report	Pituca (yellow card) 7'; Higuchi (yellow card) 27'; Sekigawa (yellow card) 36'; Nakama 52'	Stadium: Kawasaki Todoroki Stadium; Attendance: 20,757; Referee: Ryuji Sato

3 September 2022 28	Kashima Antlers	2−2	Urawa Red Diamonds	Kashima
18:03 JST	Caíke 16', 27'; Suzuki (yellow card) 77'; Pitcua (yellow card) 90+5'	Report	Matsuo 30'; Koizumi (yellow card) 47'; Iwanami 67'; Sekine (yellow card) 90+5'	Stadium: Kashima Soccer Stadium; Attendance: 20,664; Referee: Hiroki Kasahara

10 September 2022 29	Kyoto Sanga	1−1	Kashima Antlers	Kameoka
19:03 JST	Yamasaki 20'; Sato (yellow card) 38'; Takeda (yellow card) 90'	Report	Araki (yellow card) 40'; Pituca 76'	Stadium: Sanga Stadium by Kyocera; Attendance: 12,946; Referee: Futoshi Nakamura

16 September 2022 30	Sagan Tosu	1−1	Kashima Antlers	Tosu
19:03 JST	Miyashiro 34'; Naganuma (yellow card) 44'; Hwang Seok-ho (yellow card) 65'; Park Keon-woo (yellow card) 89'	Report	Caíke 59'; Nago (yellow card) 90+3'	Stadium: Ekimae Real Estate Stadium; Attendance: 8,572; Referee: Akihiko Ikeuchi

1 October 2022 31	Kashima Antlers	0−1	FC Tokyo	Kashima
15:03 JST	Pituca (yellow card) 51'	Report	Kimoto (yellow card) 10'; Abe 84'; Bangnagande (yellow card) 90+1'	Stadium: Kashima Soccer Stadium; Attendance: 21,297; Referee: Ryo Tanimoto

8 October 2022 32	Júbilo Iwata	3−3	Kashima Antlers	Iwata
14:03 JST	Suzuki 31'; Kaneko 33'; Sugimoto 45+5' (pen.)	Report	Higuchi 10' (yellow card) 70'; Eleke 47'; Everaldo 90+3'; Hirose (yellow card) 90+6'	Stadium: Yamaha Stadium; Attendance: 9,476; Referee: Masuya Ueda

29 October 2022 33	Shimizu S-Pulse	0−1	Kashima Antlers	Shimizu
15:03 JST	Inui (yellow card) 90'	Report	Misao 56'	Stadium: IAI Stadium Nihondaira; Attendance: 16,605; Referee: Akihiko Ikeuchi

5 November 2022 34	Kashima Antlers	0−0	Gamba Osaka	Kashima
14:03 JST	Higuchi (yellow card) 25'	Report	Miura (yellow card) 27'; Dawhan (yellow card) 45+1'; Kurokawa (yellow card) 78'	Stadium: Kashima Soccer Stadium; Attendance: 21,575; Referee: Hayato Shimizu

=== J.League Cup ===
Kashima were drawn into Group A as the team that finished in the highest position in the league in the previous season (4th) without qualifying for the 2022 AFC Champions League – the four that did qualify received byes from the group stage of the cup.

==== Group stage ====
Pos	Team	Pld	W	D	L	GF	GA	GD	Pts	Qualification	ANT	CER	GAM	OIT
1	Kashima Antlers	6	4	1	1	16	7	+9	13	Advanced to play-off stage	—	0–1	4–1	3–0
2	Cerezo Osaka	6	3	2	1	14	9	+5	11	Advanced to play-off stage	1–3	—	0–0	6–1
3	Gamba Osaka	6	1	2	3	8	12	−4	5		3–1	2–3	—	2–0
4	Oita Trinita	6	0	3	3	9	19	−10	3		3–3	3–3	2–2	—

Updated to match(es) played on 18 May 2022. Source: Table, Results
Legend: Blue = home team win; Yellow = draw; Red = away team win.

2 March 2022	Kashima Antlers	0–1	Cerezo Osaka	Kashima
19:03 JST	Pitcua (yellow card) 27'	Report	Kitano 12'; Matsuda (yellow card) 26'; Shimizu (yellow card) 73'	Stadium: Kashima Soccer Stadium; Attendance: 3,966; Referee: Takafumi Mikuriya
Note: Matchweek 2

15 March 2022	Oita Trinita	3–3	Kashima Antlers	Ōita
19:03 JST	Goya 14'; Yashiki 20'; Nishikawa (yellow card) 74'; Inoue (yellow card) 82'; Nagasawa 90+1'	Report	Someno 3'; Nakama (yellow card) 46'; Pituca 62' (pen.); Ueda 75' (pen.); Suzuki (yellow card) 90+4'	Stadium: Showa Denko Dome Oita; Attendance: 2,938; Referee: Yudai Yamamoto

26 March 2022	Kashima Antlers	4–1	Gamba Osaka	Kashima
15:03 JST	Misao 52'; Suzuki (yellow card) 53' (goal) 66'; Sekigawa 73'; Someno 90'	Report	Patric 4'	Stadium: Kashima Soccer Stadium; Attendance: 6,260; Referee: Hayato Shimizu

13 April 2022	Cerezo Osaka	1–3	Kashima Antlers	Osaka
19:03 JST	Kitano 74'	Report	Caíke 32' (pen.); Ueda 53'; Bueno 87'	Stadium: Yodoko Sakura Stadium; Attendance: 4,969; Referee: Takuto Okabe

23 April 2022	Kashima Antlers	3–0	Oita Trinita	Kashima
15:03 JST	Higuchi 51'; Suzuki 58'; Caíke 67' (yellow card) 71'; Tsunemoto (yellow card) 79'; Bueno (yellow card) 81'	Report	Haneda (red card) 45'	Stadium: Kashima Soccer Stadium; Attendance: 6,548; Referee: Hiroki Kasahara

18 May 2022	Gamba Osaka	1–3	Kashima Antlers	Suita
19:03 JST	Okuno (yellow card) 72'; Miura 78'	Report	Ueda 16'; Nakamura (yellow card) 28'; Doi 58', 80'; Bueno (yellow card) 64'	Stadium: Panasonic Stadium Suita; Attendance: 4,254; Referee: Jumpei Iida

==== Play-off stage ====
4 June 2022 Play-off Leg 1	Avispa Fukuoka	1–0	Kashima Antlers	Fukuoka
18:03 JST	Yamagishi 23'; Juanma (yellow card) 83'; Tanabe (yellow card) 90+1'	Report	Everaldo (yellow card) 85'	Stadium: Best Denki Stadium; Attendance: 3,316; Referee: Takafumi Mikuriya

11 June 2022 Play-off Leg 2	Kashima Antlers	2–1	Avispa Fukuoka	Kashima
15:03 JST	Everaldo 34'; Nakama 40'	Report	Juanma (yellow card) 20'; Yamagishi 45+5' (yellow card) 90'	Stadium: Kashima Soccer Stadium; Attendance: 9,085; Referee: Akihiko Ikeuchi

2–2 on aggregate. Avispa Fukuoka won on away goals.

=== Emperor's Cup ===
1 June 2022 Second round	Kashima Antlers	2–1	Niigata University HWSC	Kashima
19:00 JST	Someno 56'; Izumi 74'	Report (JFA); Report (JFA)	Komori 85'	Stadium: Kashima Soccer Stadium; Attendance: 2,670; Referee: Keigo Sendachi

22 June 2022 Third round	Kashima Antlers	3–0	Omiya Ardija	Saitama
19:00 JST	Nakama 16'; Suzuki 52'; Ueda 90'	Report (JFA); Report (JFA)		Stadium: NACK5 Stadium Omiya; Attendance: 6,161; Referee: Shu Kawamata

13 July 2022 Round of 16	Kashima Antlers	2–0	Gamba Osaka	Kashima
19:00 JST	Pituca 71'; Everaldo 75'	Report (JFA); Report (JFA)		Stadium: Kashima Soccer Stadium; Attendance: 3,663; Referee: Akehiko Ikeuchi

7 September 2022 Quarter-finals	Vissel Kobe	0–1	Kashima Antlers	Kobe
19:03 JST	Ogihara (yellow card) 55'	Report (JFA); Report (JFA)	Suzuki 62'; Caíke (yellow card) 90+1'	Stadium: Noevir Stadium Kobe; Attendance: 4,931; Referee: Jumpei Iida

5 October 2022 Semi-finals	Ventforet Kofu	1–0	Kashima Antlers	Kashima
17:30 JST	Miyazaki 37'	Report (JFA); Report (JFA)		Stadium: Kashima Soccer Stadium; Attendance: 8,965; Referee: Koichiro Fukushima

== Statistics ==
=== Appearances ===
No.	Pos.	Name	J1 League		Emperor's Cup		J.League Cup		Total	
No.	Pos.	Name	Apps	Goals	Apps	Goals	Apps	Goals	Apps	Goals
Goalkeepers
1	GK	(South Korea) Kwoun Sun-tae	27	0	2	0	3	0	32	0
29	GK	(Japan) Tomoki Hayakawa	5	0	0	0	0	0	5	0
31	GK	(Japan) Yuya Oki	2	0	3	0	5	0	10	0
Defenders
2	DF	(Japan) Koki Anzai	28+5	0	3+1	0	5+3	0	45	0
5	DF	(Japan) Ikuma Sekigawa	27+5	0	4	0	5	1	41	1
15	DF	(Brazil) Bueno	4+3	0	0+1	0	4+1	1	13	1
16	DF	(Japan) Itsuki Oda	1+1	0	1	0	1+2	0	6	0
20	DF	(South Korea) Kim Min-tae	13+8	1	2+1	0	3+2	0	29	1
22	DF	(Japan) Rikuto Hirose	15+5	0	4+1	0	4+1	0	30	0
23	DF	(Japan) Naoki Hayashi	0+1	0	0	0	0	0	1	0
28	DF	(Japan) Shuhei Mizoguchi	0	0	2	0	0+1	0	3	0
32	DF	(Japan) Keigo Tsunemoto	24+4	0	1	0	5+1	0	35	0
Midfielders
6	MF	(Japan) Kento Misao	31+2	2	4	0	6	1	43	3
10	MF	(Japan) Ryotaro Araki	6+7	1	0	0	3+1	0	17	1
11	MF	(Japan) Ryuji Izumi	23+9	1	1+2	1	4+3	0	40	2
14	MF	(Japan) Yuta Higuchi	29+3	2	3	0	4+3	1	42	3
17	MF	(Brazil) Arthur Caíke	23+6	9	2+1	0	5+1	2	38	11
21	MF	(Brazil) Diego Pituca	24+4	1	3+1	1	3	1	35	3
24	MF	(Japan) Yusuke Ogawa	0	0	0+1	0	0	0	1	0
27	MF	(Japan) Yuta Matsumura	5+7	1	0+2	0	2	0	16	1
30	MF	(Japan) Shintaro Nago	1+4	0	1	0	0	0	6	0
33	MF	(Japan) Hayato Nakama	12+7	2	2+1	1	3+2	1	27	4
34	MF	(Japan) Yu Funabashi	3+10	0	3	0	2+1	0	19	0
35	MF	(Japan) Ryotaro Nakamura	2+10	0	2+1	0	4+2	0	21	0
Forwards
8	FW	(Japan) Shoma Doi	11+12	1	3+2	0	5+2	2	35	3
9	FW	(Brazil) Everaldo	3+16	5	2+3	1	1+2	1	27	7
19	FW	(Nigeria) Blessing Eleke	2+2	1	0	0	0	0	4	0
40	FW	(Japan) Yuma Suzuki	31+1	7	4	2	4+1	2	41	11
Players loaned or transferred out during the season
7	MF	(Brazil) Juan Alano	5+7	1	2+1	0	3+1	0	19	1
18	FW	(Japan) Ayase Ueda	17+1	10	0+1	1	2+2	3	25	14
19	FW	(Japan) Itsuki Someno	0+12	1	1	1	2+6	2	21	4

Last updated: 6 November 2022.
Source: jleague.co, Soccer D.B.

=== Goalscorers ===
The list is sorted by shirt number when total goals are equal.

Rnk	Pos	No.	Player	J1	EC	JLC	Total
1	FW	18	(Japan) Ayase Ueda	10	1	3	14
2	MF	17	(Brazil) Arthur Caíke	9	0	2	11
2	FW	40	(Japan) Yuma Suzuki	7	2	2	11
4	FW	9	(Brazil) Everaldo	5	1	1	7
5	FW	19	(Japan) Itsuki Someno	1	1	2	4
5	MF	33	(Japan) Hayato Nakama	2	1	1	4
7	MF	6	(Japan) Kento Misao	2	0	1	3
7	FW	8	(Japan) Shoma Doi	1	0	2	3
7	MF	14	(Japan) Yuta Higuchi	2	0	1	3
7	MF	21	(Brazil) Diego Pituca	1	1	1	3
11	MF	11	(Japan) Ryuji Izumi	1	1	0	2
12	DF	5	(Japan) Ikuma Sekigawa	0	0	1	1
12	MF	7	(Brazil) Juan Alano	1	0	0	1
12	MF	13	(Japan) Ryotaro Araki	1	0	0	1
12	DF	15	(Brazil) Bueno	0	0	1	1
12	FW	19	(Nigeria) Blessing Eleke	1	0	0	1
12	DF	20	(South Korea) Kim Min-tae	1	0	0	1
12	MF	27	(Japan) Yuta Matsumura	1	0	0	1
12	–	–	Own goal	1	0	0	1
TOTALS				47	8	18	73

Last updated: 29 October 2022.
Source: jleague.co, besoccer.com

=== Assists ===
The list is sorted by shirt number when total assists are equal.

Rnk	Pos	No.	Player	J1	EC	JLC	Total
1	MF	14	(Japan) Yuta Higuchi	8	0	5	13
2	FW	40	(Japan) Yuma Suzuki	9	0	0	9
3	MF	17	(Brazil) Arthur Caíke	3	1	1	5
4	MF	11	(Japan) Ryuji Izumi	4	0	0	4
4	DF	22	(Japan) Rikuto Hirose	3	1	0	4
6	DF	2	(Japan) Koki Anzai	1	1	1	3
7	FW	9	(Brazil) Everaldo	0	2	0	2
7	MF	13	(Japan) Ryotaro Araki	1	0	1	2
7	MF	21	(Brazil) Diego Pituca	2	0	0	2
7	MF	27	(Japan) Yuta Matsumura	1	0	1	2
7	DF	32	(Japan) Keigo Tsunemoto	1	0	1	2
12	DF	5	(Japan) Ikuma Sekigawa	0	1	0	1
12	MF	7	(Brazil) Juan Alano	0	0	1	1
12	FW	8	(Japan) Shoma Doi	0	1	0	1
12	DF	15	(Brazil) Bueno	1	0	0	1
12	FW	18	(Japan) Ayase Ueda	1	0	0	1
12	FW	19	(Nigeria) Blessing Eleke	1	0	0	1
12	FW	19	(Japan) Itsuki Someno	0	0	1	1
TOTALS				36	7	12	55

Last updated: 29 October 2022.
Source: jleague.co

=== Clean sheets ===
The list is sorted by shirt number when total clean sheets are equal.

Rnk	No.	Player	J1	EC	JLC	Total
1	1	(South Korea) Kwoun Sun-tae	8	1	0	6
2	31	(Japan) Yuya Oki	0	2	1	3
3	29	(Japan) Tomoki Hayakawa	2	0	0	2
TOTALS			10	3	1	14

Last updated: 5 November 2022.
Source: fbref.com
