= 2020 Kashima Antlers season =

Kashima Antlers
2020 season
- Chairman: Fumiaki Koizumi
- Manager: Antônio Carlos Zago
- Stadium: Kashima Soccer Stadium
- J1 League: 5th
- Emperor's Cup: Preseason
- J.League Cup: Group stage
- AFC Champions League: Qualifying play-off
- Top goalscorer: Everaldo (18)
Home colours	Away colours

The 2020 season was Kashima Antlers's 28th consecutive season in the J1 League, the top flight of Japanese football, since the introduction of professional football in 1993. The club finished the 2019 J1 League in third place, securing a play-off spot in the 2020 AFC Champions League. In addition to these competitions, they also competed in the Emperor's Cup and J.League Cup.

== Squad ==
As of 23 February 2020.

Note: Flags indicate national team as defined under FIFA eligibility rules; some limited exceptions apply. Players may hold more than one non-FIFA nationality.

No.	Pos.	Nation	Player
1	GK	KOR	Kwoun Sun-tae
2	DF	JPN	Atsuto Uchida (captain)
3	DF	JPN	Tatsuki Nara
4	MF	BRA	Léo Silva
5	DF	JPN	Daiki Sugioka
6	MF	JPN	Ryota Nagaki
7	MF	BRA	Juan Alano
8	MF	JPN	Shoma Doi
9	FW	BRA	Everaldo
11	MF	JPN	Ryuji Izumi
14	DF	JPN	Katsuya Nagato
15	FW	JPN	Sho Ito
16	DF	JPN	Shuto Yamamoto
19	FW	JPN	Itsuki Someno
20	MF	JPN	Kento Misao
21	GK	JPN	Hitoshi Sogahata

No.	Pos.	Nation	Player
22	DF	JPN	Rikuto Hirose
24	DF	JPN	Yukitoshi Ito
25	MF	JPN	Yasushi Endo
26	DF	JPN	Ryotaro Araki
27	MF	JPN	Yuta Matsumura
28	DF	JPN	Koki Machida
30	MF	JPN	Shintaro Nago
31	GK	JPN	Yuya Oki
33	DF	JPN	Ikuma Sekigawa
34	MF	JPN	Kotaro Arima
35	DF	JPN	Shogo Sasaki
36	FW	JPN	Ayase Ueda
37	MF	JPN	Kei Koizumi
38	GK	JPN	Taiki Yamada
39	DF	JPN	Tomoya Inukai (df)
41	MF	JPN	Ryōhei Shirasaki

== Transfers ==
=== Arrivals ===
Date	Position	Player	From	Type	Source
3 January 2020	DF	(Japan) Daiki Sugioka	(Japan) Shonan Bellmare	Full	
3 January 2020	DF	(Japan) Rikuto Hirose	(Japan) Yokohama F. Marinos	Full	
3 January 2020	DF	(Japan) Katsuya Nagato	(Japan) Vegalta Sendai	Full	
4 January 2020	MF	(Brazil) Juan Alano	(Brazil) SC Internacional	Full	
4 January 2020	DF	(Japan) Tatsuki Nara	(Japan) Kawasaki Frontale	Full	
4 January 2020	MF	(Japan) Ryuji Izumi	(Japan) Nagoya Grampus	Full	
4 January 2020	FW	(Brazil) Everaldo	(Mexico) Querétaro F.C.	Full	
31 January 2020	MF	(Japan) Kazune Kubota	(Japan) Fagiano Okayama	Return from loan	
1 February 2020	MF	(Japan) Ryotaro Araki	(Japan) Higashi Fukuoka High School	Full	
1 February 2020	MF	(Japan) Yuta Matsumura	(Japan) Shizuoka Gakuen HS	Full	
1 February 2020	FW	(Japan) Itsuki Someno	(Japan) Shoshi HS	Full	
8 September 2020	DF	(Japan) Keigo Tsunemoto	(Japan) Meiji University	Loan (designated special player)	

=== Departures ===
Date	Position	Player	To	Type	Source
26 December 2019	FW	(Japan) Yuki Kakita	(Japan) Tokushima Vortis	Loan	
3 January 2020	FW	(Japan) Takeshi Kanamori	(Japan) Sagan Tosu	Full	
3 January 2020	MF	(Japan) Atsutaka Nakamura	(Japan) Montedio Yamagata	Full	
3 January 2020	GK	(Japan) Shinichiro Kawamata	(Japan) Nankatsu SC	Full	
3 January 2020	FW	(Japan) Takeshi Kanamori	(Japan) Sagan Tosu	Full	
3 January 2020	DF	(South Korea) Jung Seung-hyun	(South Korea) Ulsan Hyundai	Full	
3 January 2020	FW	(Japan) Kazuma Yamaguchi	(Japan) Mito Hollyhock	Loan	
3 January 2020	MF	(Japan) Kotaro Arima	(Japan) Tochigi SC	Loan	
3 January 2020	DF	(Japan) Yuta Koike	(Belgium) Sint-Truidense	End of loan	
15 January 2020	DF	(Japan) Itsuki Oda	(Japan) Machida Zelvia	Loan	
25 January 2020	FW	(Brazil) Serginho	(China) Changchun Yatai	Full	
28 January 2020	FW	(Brazil) Leandro	(Japan) FC Tokyo	Loan	
30 January 2020	MF	(Japan) Yuki Soma	(Japan) Nagoya Grampus	End of loan	
25 March 2020	MF	(Japan) Kazune Kubota	(Japan) Matsumoto Yamaga	Full	
16 June 2020	DF	(Brazil) Bueno	(Brazil) Atlético Mineiro	Loan	
21 August 2020	DF	(Japan) Shogo Sasaki	(Japan) Iwate Grulla Morioka	Loan	
31 August 2020	DF	(Japan) Atsuto Uchida		Retired	

== Competitions ==
=== J1 League ===
==== League table ====
Pos	Team	Pld	W	D	L	GF	GA	GD	Pts	Qualification or relegation
3	Nagoya Grampus	34	19	6	9	45	28	+17	63	Qualification for AFC Champions League group stage (Note: Since the winners of the 2020 Emperor's Cup, Kawasaki Frontale, qualified for the Champions League group stage, the spot given to the Emperor's Cup winners (Champions League group stage) was passed to the third-placed team and the spot given to the third-place team (Champions League play-off round) was passed to the fourth-placed team.)
4	Cerezo Osaka	34	18	6	10	46	37	+9	60	Qualification for AFC Champions League play-off round
5	Kashima Antlers	34	18	5	11	55	44	+11	59	
6	FC Tokyo	34	17	6	11	47	42	+5	57	
7	Kashiwa Reysol	34	15	7	12	60	46	+14	52	

Source: J.League Data Site
Rules for classification: 1) Points; 2) Goal difference; 3) Head-to-head points; 4) Head-to-head goal difference; 5) Head-to-head goal scored; 6) Number of wins; 7) Goals scored; 8) Fair-play points.

==== Results summary ====
Overall								Home						Away					
Pld	W	D	L	GF	GA	GD	Pts	W	D	L	GF	GA	GD	W	D	L	GF	GA	GD
34	18	5	11	55	44	+11	59	8	5	4	27	22	+5	10	0	7	28	22	+6

Last updated: 19 December 2020.
Source: see below

==== Results by matchday ====
Round	1	2	3	4	5	6	7	8	9	10	11	12	13	14	15	16	17	18	19	20	21	22	23	24	25	26	27	28	29	30	31	32	33	34
Ground	A	A	H	A	H	A	H	A	H	H	A	H	A	A	A	H	A	A	H	H	A	H	A	A	A	H	H	A	H	A	H	H	H	H
Result	L	L	L	L	W	L	D	W	W	D	L	D	W	W	W	W	W	W	W	L	L	W	W	L	W	W	L	W	D	W	L	W	W	D
Position	18	18	18	18	15	17	17	12	12	12	12	13	5	5	5	5	5	5	5	5	5	5	5	5	5	5	5	5	5	5	5	5	5	5

Updated to match(es) played on 19 December 2020. Source: See Below
A = Away; H = Home; W = Win; D = Draw; L = Loss

==== Results ====
23 February 2020 1	Sanfrecce Hiroshima	3–0	Kashima Antlers	Hiroshima
14:03 JST	Vieira 20'; Pereira 25'; Morishima 84'	Report		Stadium: Edion Stadium Hiroshima; Attendance: 18,713

4 July 2020 2	Kawasaki Frontale	2–1	Kashima Antlers	Kawasaki, Kanagawa
19:03 JST	Taniguchi 2'; Hasegawa 30'; Ienaga (yellow card) 43'; Yamane (yellow card) 81'	Report	Uchida (yellow card) 17'; Own goal 32'; Machida (yellow card) 76'; Nagaki (yellow card) 87'	Stadium: Kawasaki Todoroki Stadium; Attendance: 0 (Note: Match played behind closed doors)

8 July 2020 3	Kashima Antlers	0–2	Consadole Sapporo	Kashima, Ibaraki
19:03	Endo (yellow card) 80'	Report	Suzuki 7'; Arano (yellow card) 37'; Suga (yellow card) 49'; Fukai (yellow card) 53'; Sugueno (yellow card) 89'; Kaneko (yellow card) 90+1'; Lucas Fernandes 90+3'	Stadium: Kashima Soccer Stadium; Attendance: 0

12 July 2020 4	Urawa Red Diamonds	1–0	Kashima Antlers	Midori-ku, Saitama
19:00 JST	Ewerton (yellow card) 15' (goal) 52'; Shibato (yellow card) 77'; Sekine (yellow card) 81'	Report	Nagaki (yellow card) 34'; Machida (yellow card) 48'	Stadium: Saitama Stadium 2002; Attendance: 3,094; Referee: Hiroyuki Kimura

18 July 2020 5	Kashima Antlers	4–2	Yokohama F. Marinos	Kashima, Ibaraki
18:00	Ueda 4', 58'; Everaldo 67'; Shirasaki 82'	Report	Marcos Júnior 12', 70'	Stadium: Kashima Soccer Stadium; Attendance: 3,090; Referee: Yuichi Nishimura

22 July 2020 6	Shonan Bellmare	1–0	Kashima Antlers	Hiratsuka
19:03 JST	Saito (yellow card) 22'; Ishihara 66'	Report	Ueda (yellow card) 34'; Someno (yellow card) 72'; Inukai (yellow card) 86'	Stadium: Shonan BMW Stadium Hiratsuka; Attendance: 3,498; Referee: Minoru Tōjō

26 July 2020 7	Kashima Antlers	2–2	FC Tokyo	Kashima, Ibaraki
18:33	Alano (yellow card) 27'; Everaldo 34'; Doi 75'	Report	Nagai (yellow card) 22'; Watanabe 45'; Morishige 45+5' (yellow card) 90'; Diego Oliveira (yellow card) 90+5'	Stadium: Kashima Soccer Stadium; Attendance: 3,027; Referee: Jumpei Iida

1 August 2020 8	Oita Trinita	1–4	Kashima Antlers	Ōita
19:03 JST	Takazawa 5'; Shimakawa (yellow card) 27'	Report	Everaldo 15', 40', 55'; Misao (yellow card) 66'; Ito 90+5'	Stadium: Showa Denko Dome Oita; Attendance: 4,225; Referee: Hiroki Kasahara

8 August 2020 9	Kashima Antlers	2–0	Sagan Tosu	Kashima, Ibaraki
18:33	Izumi 69'; Everaldo 80'	Report	Morishita (yellow card) 5'	Stadium: Kashima Soccer Stadium; Attendance: 3,913; Referee: Yuichi Nishimura

16 August 2020 10	Kashima Antlers	2–2	Vissel Kobe	Kashima, Ibaraki
18:33 JST	Silva (yellow card) 34'; Everaldo 38'; Hirose (yellow card) 71'; Araki 90+4'	Report	Dankler 19'; Goke 61'; Iniesta (yellow card) 63'; Douglas (yellow card) 67'	Stadium: Kashima Soccer Stadium; Attendance: 4,766; Referee: Minoru Tōjō

19 August 2020 11	Yokohama FC	1–0	Kashima Antlers	Kanagawa-ku, Yokohama
19:03 JST	Minagawa 25'	Report	Nara (yellow card) 10'	Stadium: NHK Spring Mitsuzawa Football Stadium; Attendance: 2,773; Referee: Masuya Ueda

23 August 2020 12	Kashima Antlers	1–1	Gamba Osaka	Kashima
19:00 JST	Uchida (yellow card) 39'; Inukai (yellow card) 89' (goal) 90+5'	Report	Onose 6'; Higashiguchi (yellow card) 47'; Ono (yellow card) 87'	Stadium: Kashima Soccer Stadium; Attendance: 4,949; Referee: (Japan) Yusuke Araki

26 August 2020 13	FC Tokyo	1–2	Kashima Antlers	Chōfu
19:00 JST	Sekigawa 45+1' (o.g.); Arthur Silva (yellow card) 62'	Report	Everaldo 48'; Juan Alano 57'; Nagato (yellow card) 78'; Misao (yellow card) 86'	Stadium: Ajinomoto Stadium; Attendance: 4,390; Referee: (Japan) Hiroyuki Kimura

29 August 2020 14	Kashiwa Reysol	2–3	Kashima Antlers	Kashiwa
19:00 JST	Takahashi (yellow card) 27' (yellow-red card) 45+5'; Richardson (yellow card) 34'; Olunga 57' 84'; Toshima (yellow card) 73'	Report	Izumi (yellow card) 32'; Misao 72'; Doi 89' 90+1'	Stadium: Sankyo Frontier Kashiwa Stadium; Attendance: 2,728; Referee: (Japan) Yoshiro Imamura

5 September 2020 15	Nagoya Grampus	1–3	Kashima Antlers	Toyota
18:00 JST	Inagaki (yellow card) 40' (goal) 49'; Abe (yellow card) 83'	Report	Izumi 16'; Misao (yellow card) 35'; Araki 37'; Doi 63'	Stadium: Toyota Stadium; Attendance: 4,951; Referee: (Japan) Koichiro Fukushima

9 September 2020 16	Kashima Antlers	2–1	Vegalta Sendai	Kashima
19:00 JST	Everaldo 45+2'; Ueda 83'	Report	Hamasaki (yellow card) 21'; Nagasawa 87'; Shiihashi (yellow card) 90+5'	Stadium: Kashima Soccer Stadium; Attendance: 3,839; Referee: (Japan) Minoru Tōjō

12 September 2020 17	Shimizu S-Pulse	1–2	Kashima Antlers	Shizuoka
18:00 JST	Dangda 79'	Report	Inukai (yellow card) 16'; Everaldo 29'; Doi 32'; Araki (yellow card) 65'	Stadium: IAI Stadium Nihondaira; Attendance: 4,774; Referee: (Japan) Yuichi Nishimura

19 September 2020 18	Cerezo Osaka	1–2	Kashima Antlers	Osaka
18:00 JST	Bruno Mendes 36'; Seko (yellow card) 86'	Report	Juan Alano 32'; Misao (yellow card) 39'; Everaldo 46'	Stadium: Yanmar Stadium Nagai; Attendance: 6,836; Referee: (Japan) Hajime Matsuo

23 September 2020 19	Kashima Antlers	1–0	Shonan Bellmare	Kashima
20:00 JST	Koizumi (yellow card) 41'; Inukai (yellow card) 49'; Juan Alano 90+4'	Report	Okamoto (yellow card) 46'	Stadium: Kashima Soccer Stadium; Attendance: 3,194; Referee: (Japan) Jumpei Iida

27 September 2020 20	Kashima Antlers	0–2	Oita Trinita	Kashima
18:00 JST	Juan Alano (yellow card) 62'; Sekigawa (yellow card) 76'	Report	Shimakawa (yellow card) 45'; Kozuka 57'; Mun (yellow card) 65'; Takazawa 80'	Stadium: Kashima Soccer Stadium; Attendance: 6,982; Referee: (Japan) Yusuke Araki

3 October 2020 21	Gamba Osaka	2–0	Kashima Antlers	Suita
19:00 JST	Patric 66'; Watanabe 90+3'	Report	Everaldo (yellow card) 67'	Stadium: Panasonic Stadium Suita; Attendance: 9,313; Referee: (Japan) Ryuji Sato

10 October 2020 22	Kashima Antlers	3–2	Yokohama FC	Kashima
16:00 JST	Koizumi (yellow card) 36'; Everaldo 58'; Misao (yellow card) 69'; Tashiro 88' (o.g.); Koizumi 90+2'	Report	Senuma 2'; Matsuo 13'	Stadium: Kashima Soccer Stadium; Attendance: 5,671; Referee: (Japan) Yuichi Nishimura

14 October 2020 23	Sagan Tosu	0–2	Kashima Antlers	Tosu
18:45 JST	Matsuoka (yellow card) 60'	Report	Shirasaki 12'; Shirasaki (yellow card) 41'; Inukai 86'	Stadium: Ekimae Real Estate Stadium; Attendance: 3,882; Referee: (Japan) Koichiro Fukushima

18 October 2020 24	Hokkaido Consadole Sapporo	1–0	Kashima Antlers	Sapporo
13:00 JST	Komai 41'; Kim (yellow card) 45+1'	Report		Stadium: Sapporo Dome; Attendance: 5,359; Referee: (Japan) Hiroyuki Kimura

21 October 2020 25	Vissel Kobe	1–3	Kashima Antlers	Kobe
18:00 JST	Fujimoto 61'	Report	Ueda 12'; Izumi 43'; Doi 78'	Stadium: Noevir Stadium Kobe; Attendance: 6,553; Referee: (Japan) Nobotsugu Murakami

24 October 2020 26	Kashima Antlers	1–0	Sanfrecce Hiroshima	Kashima
14:00 JST	Machida (yellow card) 59'; Everaldo 76'	Report		Stadium: Kashima Soccer Stadium; Attendance: 7,466; Referee: (Japan) Minoro Tojo

31 October 2020 27	Kashima Antlers	0–2	Nagoya Grampus	Kashima
17:00 JST	Silva (yellow card) 10'; Everaldo (yellow card) 45+3'; Alano (yellow card) 61' (yellow-red card) 68'	Report	Kanazaki 7'; Naruse (yellow card) 70'; Abe (yellow card) 82'; Mateus 90+2'	Stadium: Kashima Soccer Stadium; Attendance: 8,912; Referee: (Japan) Yusuke Araki

3 November 2020 28	Yokohama F. Marinos	2–3	Kashima Antlers	Yokohama
13:00 JST	Mizunuma 17'; Erik 27' (yellow card) 68'; Ohgihara (yellow card) 67'; Ito (yellow card) 87'	Report	Koizumi (yellow card) 6'; Ueda 39'; Everaldo (yellow card) 65' (goal) 78'; Endo 84'	Stadium: Nissan Stadium; Attendance: 20,515; Referee: (Japan) Yudai Yamamoto

14 November 2020 29	Kashima Antlers	1–1	Kawasaki Frontale	Kashima
17:00 JST	Inukai (yellow card) 52'; Ueda (yellow card) 57'; Everaldo 75'; Misao (red card) 90+3'	Report	Wakizaka 7'; Taniguchi (yellow card) 34'; Jesiel (yellow card) 90+2'	Stadium: Kashima Soccer Stadium; Attendance: 13,463; Referee: (Japan) Ryuji Sato

21 November 2020 30	Vegalta Sendai	1–3	Kashima Antlers	Sendai
15:00 JST	Nagasawa 76'	Report	Nara (yellow card) 45+3'; Everaldo 47'; Alano 57'; Ueda 62'	Stadium: Yurtec Stadium Sendai; Attendance: 7,487; Referee: (Japan) Hiroyuki Kimura

25 November 2020 31	Kashima Antlers	1–4	Kashiwa Reysol	Kashima
19:00 JST	Inukai (yellow card) 45+2'; Kim 56' (o.g.)	Report	Cristiano (yellow card) 6' (goal) 83'; Kitazume 26'; Olunga 75'; Kamiya 90+1'	Stadium: Kashima Soccer Stadium; Attendance: 4,327; Referee: (Japan) Minoru Tojo

29 November 2020 32	Kashima Antlers	4–0	Urawa Reds	Kashima
15:00 JST	Ueda 11', 50'; Everaldo 64'; Silva 81'	Report	Nagasawa (yellow card) 6'; Leonardo (yellow card) 41'; Yamanaka (yellow card) 90+2'	Stadium: Kashima Soccer Stadium; Attendance: 11,645; Referee: (Japan) Yuichi Nishimura

12 December 2020 33	Kashima Antlers	2–0	Shimizu S-Pulse	Kashima
16:00 JST	Ueda 4', 12'	Report	Hwang (yellow card) 6'; Elsinho (yellow card) 79'; Valdo (yellow card) 80'	Stadium: Kashima Soccer Stadium; Attendance: 7,907; Referee: (Japan) Ryuji Sato

19 December 2020 34	Kashima Antlers	1–1	Cerezo Osaka	Kashima
14:00 JST	Misao (yellow card) 32'; Nagaki (yellow card) 56'; Everaldo 90'	Report	Matsuda 83'	Stadium: Kashima Soccer Stadium; Attendance: 11,251; Referee: (Japan) Yoshiro Imamura

=== J.League Cup ===
==== Group stage ====
Pos	Team	Pld	W	D	L	GF	GA	GD	Pts	FRO	GRA	ANT	SSP
1	Kawasaki Frontale	3	2	1	0	10	5	+5	7	—	—	—	5–1
2	Nagoya Grampus	3	2	1	0	6	2	+4	7 (Note: Most points among the 2nd place finishers in each group.)	2–2	—	1–0	—
3	Kashima Antlers	3	1	0	2	5	6	−1	3	2–3	—	—	—
4	Shimizu S-Pulse	3	0	0	3	3	11	−8	0	—	0–3	2–3	—

Source: Table, Results
Legend: Blue = home team win; Yellow = draw; Red = away team win.

=== AFC Champions League ===
==== Qualifying play-offs ====
28 January 2020	Kashima Antlers	0–1	(Australia) Melbourne Victory	Kashima Soccer Stadium, Kashima
19:00 UTC+9		Live Report; Stats Report	Nabbout 54'	Attendance: 4,275; Referee: Mooud Bonyadifar (Iran)

== Statistics ==
=== Scorers ===
Rank	No.	Pos	Player	J1 League	Emperor's Cup	J.League Cup	AFC Champions League	Total
1	9	FW	(Brazil) Everaldo	18	0	0	0	18
2	36	FW	(Japan) Ayase Ueda	10	0	0	0	10
3	8	MF	(Japan) Shoma Doi	6	0	0	0	6
4	7	MF	(Brazil) Juan Alano	4	0	0	0	4
5	11	MF	(Japan) Ryuji Izumi	3	0	0	0	3
5	41	MF	(Japan) Ryōhei Shirasaki	2	0	1	0	3
5	15	FW	(Japan) Sho Ito	1	0	2	0	3
8	39	DF	(Japan) Tomoya Inukai	2	0	0	0	2
8	26	MF	(Japan) Ryotaro Araki	2	0	0	0	2
10	4	MF	(Brazil) Léo Silva	1	0	0	0	1
10	20	MF	(Japan) Kento Misao	1	0	0	0	1
10	25	MF	(Japan) Yasushi Endo	1	0	0	0	1
10	37	MF	(Japan) Kei Koizumi	1	0	0	0	1
10	27	MF	(Japan) Yuta Matsumura	0	0	1	0	1
10	19	FW	(Japan) Itsuki Someno	0	0	1	0	1
Own goals				3	0	0	0	3
Total				55	0	5	0	60

Last updated: 8 April 2021.
Source: Competitions

=== Clean sheets ===
Rank	No.	Pos.	Player	J.League	Emperor's Cup	J.League Cup	AFC Champions League	Total
1	31	GK	(Japan) Yuya Oki	6	0	0	0	6
Total				6	0	0	0	6

Last updated: 8 April 2021.
Source: Competitions
