= Keigo Tsunemoto =

Japanese footballer (born 1998)

Keigo Tsunemoto 常本 佳吾
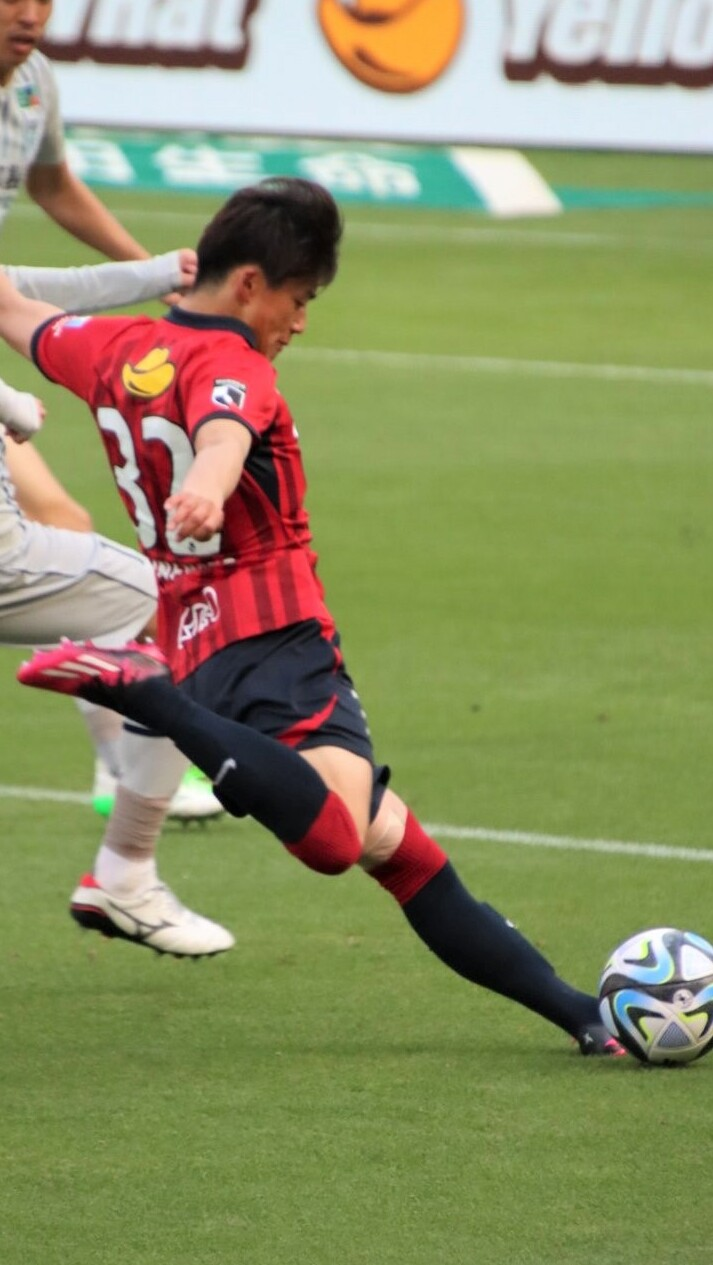
- Tsunemoto at Kashima Antlers in 2023

Personal information
- Date of birth: 21 October 1998 (age 28)
- Place of birth: Minami-ku, Sagamihara, Kanagawa, Japan
- Height: 1.74 m (5 ft 9 in)
- Position: Right-back

Team information
- Current team: FC Basel
- Number: 6

Youth career
- Machida Ogawa FC
- 2005–2016: Yokohama F. Marinos

College career
Years	Team	Apps	(Gls)
2017–2020	Meiji University		

Senior career*
Years	Team	Apps	(Gls)
2020–2023	Kashima Antlers	71	(2)
2023–2025	Servette	66	(1)
2025–	FC Basel	29	(1)

International career^{‡}
2015	Japan U17	4	(0)
- * Club domestic league appearances and goals as of 28 September 2026 ‡ National team caps and goals as of 1 April 2021, 17:00 (UTC)

Keigo Tsunemoto (常本 佳吾, Tsunemoto Keigo; born 21 October 1998) is a Japanese professional footballer who plays as a right-back for Swiss Super League club FC Basel.

== Club career ==
=== Early career and Kashima Antlers ===
Tsunemoto began his youth career with Machida Ogawa FC; he then entered the academy of Yokohama F. Marinos, where he served as a captain in the youth ranks, before being promoted to the first team as a Type 2 player (allowing him to keep playing for the club's under-18 squad) at the start of the 2016 season. In 2017, following his graduation from high school, he committed to Meiji University, and played college football until he graduated in 2020.

On 19 June 2020, Tsunemoto started his first professional career with J1 League club Kashima Antlers, signing a contract set to be active from the 2021 season; however, he was officially registered as a designated special player by the club in September of the same year. On 11 November, he made his professional and J.League debut, coming on as a substitute for Kei Koizumi in the 79th minute of a 2–3 away win over his former club Yokohama F. Marinos.

On 27 June 2021, Tsunemoto scored his first professional goal in a 4–0 league win over Hokkaido Consadole Sapporo.

=== Servette ===
On 15 July 2023, Tsunemoto joined Swiss Super League side Servette on a permanent deal, signing a three-year contract with the club: in the process, he re-united with former Kashima manager René Weiler.

He made his debut for Servette on 22 July, starting and playing 90 minutes in a 3–1 league away victory over Grasshoppers. Three days later, on 25 July, he made his debut in a continental competition, starting and playing 90 minutes in an UEFA Champions League qualifying game against Genk, as the match eventually finished 1–1. On 5 October, he made his UEFA Europa League debut, starting in a 4–0 loss to Roma in the group stage.

On 24 July 2024, Tsunemoto scored his first goal for the Swiss club in a 3–1 home league win over Young Boys.

=== FC Basel ===
On 1 July 2025, Tsunemoto joined fellow Swiss Super League side FC Basel.

== International career ==
Tsunemoto represented Japan at youth international level, having featured for the under-17 national team.

== Career statistics ==
As of 2 October 2026.

Appearances and goals by club, season and competition
Club	Season	League			National cup (Note: Includes Emperor's Cup, Swiss Cup)		League cup (Note: Includes J.League Cup)		Continental		Total	
Club	Season	Division	Apps	Goals	Apps	Goals	Apps	Goals	Apps	Goals	Apps	Goals
Meiji University	2019	–			2	0	–				2	0
Kashima Antlers	2020	J1 League	1	0	0	0	0	0	–		1	0
Kashima Antlers	2021	J1 League	26	2	4	0	7	0	–		37	2
Kashima Antlers	2022	J1 League	28	0	1	0	6	0	–		35	0
Kashima Antlers	2023	J1 League	16	0	1	0	3	0	–		20	0
Kashima Antlers	Total		71	2	6	0	16	0	0	0	93	2
Servette FC	2023–24	Swiss Super League	30	0	3	0	–		9 (Note: One appearance in UEFA Champions League, four appearances in UEFA Europa League, four appearances in UEFA Europa Conference League)	0	42	0
Servette FC	2024–25	Swiss Super League	36	1	1	0	–		4 (Note: Two appearance in UEFA Europa League, two appearances in UEFA Conference League)	0	43	1
Servette FC	Total		66	1	4	0	0	0	13	0	83	1
FC Basel	2025–26	Swiss Super League	20	1	1	0	–		5 (Note: Two appearances in UEFA Champions League, three appearances in UEFA Europa League)	0	26	1
FC Basel	2026–27	Swiss Super League	9	0	0	0	–		0	0	9	0
FC Basel	Total		29	1	1	0	–		5	0	35	1
Career total			166	4	13	0	16	0	18	0	211	4

== Honours ==
Servette FC

- Swiss Cup: 2023–24

Individual

- Swiss Super League Team of the Season by Swiss Association of Football Players: 2023–24
