= Ayase Ueda =

Japanese footballer (born 1998)

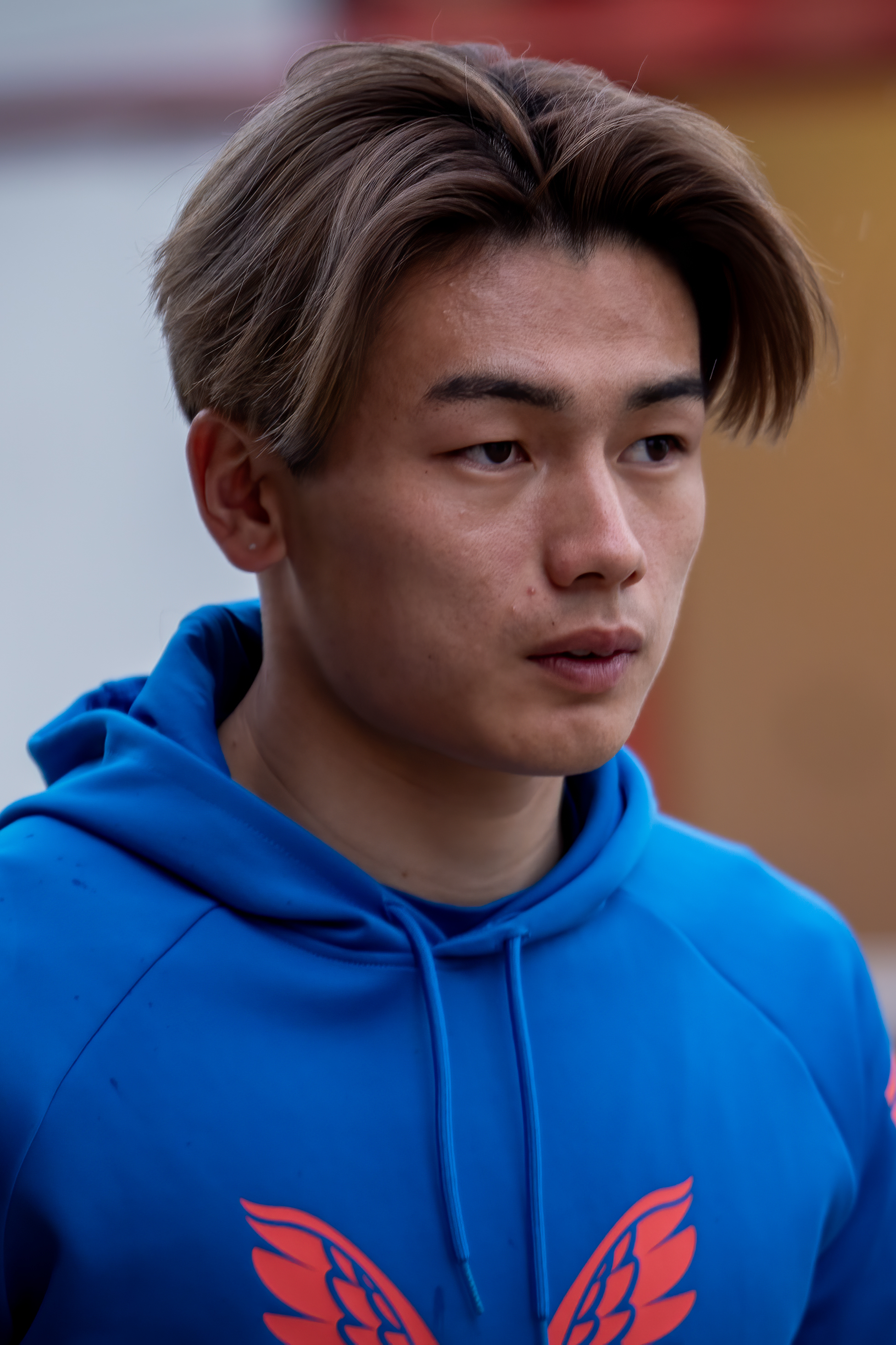
- Ueda with Feyenoord in 2024

Personal information
- Full name: Ayase Ueda
- Date of birth: 28 August 1998 (age 28)
- Place of birth: Mito, Ibaraki, Japan
- Height: 1.82 m (6 ft 0 in)
- Position: Striker

Team information
- Current team: Lille
- Number: 18

Youth career
- Yoshidagaoka SSS
- Kashima Antlers
- 2014–2016: Kashima Gakuen High School

College career
Years	Team	Apps	(Gls)
2017–2019	Hosei University		

Senior career*
Years	Team	Apps	(Gls)
2019–2022	Kashima Antlers	86	(38)
2022–2023	Cercle Brugge	40	(22)
2023–2026	Feyenoord	82	(40)
2026–	Lille	4	(2)

International career^{‡}
2017	Japan U20	3	(2)
2018	Japan U21	7	(6)
2017–2021	Japan Olympic	17	(6)
2019–	Japan	47	(22)
Medal record
Representing Japan
Asian Games
Silver medal – second place	2018 Jakarta–Palembang	Team
Summer Universiade
Gold medal – first place	2019 Naples	Team
- * Club domestic league appearances and goals as of 19:15, 10 October 2026 (UTC) ‡ National team caps and goals as of 21:40, 5 October 2026 (UTC)

Ayase Ueda (上田 綺世, Ueda Ayase; born 28 August 1998) is a Japanese professional footballer who plays as a striker for Ligue 1 club Lille and the Japan national team.

== Youth career ==
Born in the city of Mito, located in the Ibaraki Prefecture, he began playing football at age 6 and was inspired by seeing his father score a hat-trick in a match. Ueda began his youth career with Kashima Antlers Norte whilst at junior high school and then moved on to play at Kashima Gakuen High School. He represented his high school in both the Inter High School Championship and the All Japan High School Soccer Tournament – he scored two goals in the first round of the competition but the team were knocked out in the second round.

=== Hosei University ===
After graduating high school, Ueda then went on to study Sport Studies at Hosei University and he was part of the football team right from his first year. In his first year at Hosei, Ueda scored 15 goals in 27 games and won the JUFA Kanto League 1 Best Rookie award. In his second year, Ueda helped Hosei University win the All Japan University Football Championship for the first time in 42 years. He scored in the semi-final against Juntendo University and scored 2 goals in the tournament overall, where he was also selected as the Best Forward in the competition. In the 2018 JUFA Kanto League 1, he was also inducted into the season's Best XI after scoring 11 goals in 19 appearances.

After the success of his first two years at university, in February 2019 it was announced that he would be joining his boyhood club Kashima Antlers as a designated special player, with a view to join the club fully in 2021. He began the season back representing Hosei, but in July 2019 it was announced that he would be retiring from the university team and would be joining Kashima earlier than initially planned. His national team call up accelerated his departure from the university team and provided him with an opportunity to take the next step – Ueda saying "I have done what I can do in Hosei".

== Club career ==
=== Kashima Antlers ===
He made his debut for Kashima Antlers in July 2019, coming on as a late substitute for Shoma Doi in a 1–1 league draw with Urawa Red Diamonds. He scored his first professional goal the following month, in a 2–1 league victory over Yokohama F. Marinos. On his first start for the club in September, he scored two goals in a 4–0 league win against Shimizu S-Pulse. He ended his debut season with 4 league goals in less than 400 minutes. Ueda also made his first appearances in a continental competition, appearing in both games against Guangzhou F.C. in the quarter final of the 2019 AFC Champions League.

After a successful debut season, Ueda continued to make an impression in the 2020 season scoring 10 goals in 29 appearances across all competitions – made even more impressive by the fact he only played the full 90 minutes in two games all season.

In the 2021 season, Ueda's goals were vital to Kashima's top 4 finish. In 29 league games, he scored 14 goals making him Kashima's top goalscorer for the season and the fourth highest goalscorer in the league. This was in spite of him missing almost two months of football after suffering a groin strain in June. His performances did not go unrewarded and was named one of the 31 Outstanding J.League players as voted for by managers and players, although he did not make it into the eventual overall Best XI.

In 2022, he scored a brace against Gamba Osaka in what was Kashima's first official match of the season. Since then, he improved his goalscoring status, finishing as the 2022 J1 League topscorer in June, having scored 10 goals in 18 matches. In his already outstanding previous year, he needed 21 matches to score his 10 goals. And in 2022, he only needed 16 matches to match this goal tally. He also won Moriyasu's trust, and was frequently called up for the national team, having participated in 5 out of the 6 matches the national team played in from March to June. After this improvement in club performances, alongside more game-time with the national team, he secured a transfer to a European club.

=== Cercle Brugge ===
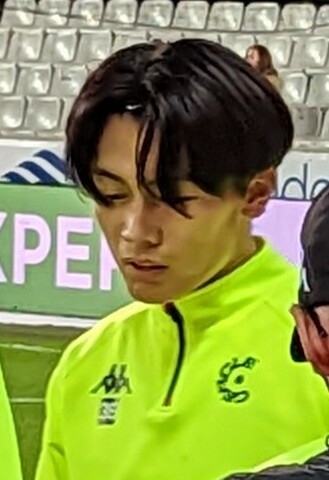
Ueda with Cercle Brugge in 2022

On 1 July 2022, Ueda was signed by Cercle Brugge on a four-season contract lasting until June 2026. He made his debut in a 2–0 league defeat to Westerlo. He had to wait until his sixth game before scoring his first goal for the club, netting in a 1–1 league draw with Zulte Waregem. Before Ueda joined up with the rest of the Japan squad to participate in the 2022 FIFA World Cup in November, he had scored eight goals in eighteen games, including a brace and a man of the match performance in a 4–1 victory over Charleroi. In the second half of the season, Ueda continued his goal-scoring form and finished the regular season with 18 league goals, making him the joint-second highest scorer in the league. Ueda finished the season with 23 goals in 42 appearances across all competitions and was runner-up in Cercle Brugge's Player of the Season vote to Thibo Somers.

=== Feyenoord ===
On 3 August 2023, Ueda signed a five-year contract with Dutch champions Feyenoord for a fee of €8 million. He was given the number 9 shirt. He made his debut in 0–0 league draw with Fortuna Sittard in the opening game of the season, after coming on as a second-half substitute for Quilindschy Hartman. He scored his first goal for the club on 3 September, scoring the fourth goal in a 5–1 away win against FC Utrecht.

Ueda made his Champions League debut in October 2023, in a 3–2 defeat to Atlético Madrid. He played 60 minutes before being substituted, in what was his first start for the club. Due to the form of teammate Santiago Giménez, Ueda was largely used as a substitute in his debut season. On 21 April 2024, he came off the bench in a 1–0 win over NEC Nijmegen in the KNVB Cup final to help Feyenoord clinch their fourteenth KNVB Cup title. In his debut season, he scored 5 goals in 26 league appearances (with only 5 games as a starter) as the team finished second in the league.

At the start of the 2024–25 season, Ueda won his second trophy with the club after Feyenoord beat PSV Eindhoven in the 2024 Johan Cruyff Shield. As the match went to a penalty shoot-out after a 4–4 draw, Ueda scored Feyenoord's second spot-kick and secured a 4–2 win.

In September 2024, he scored his first goal of the 2024–25 campaign in a 2–0 league win over NAC Breda. On 23 October, Ueda scored his first goal in a Champions League game, scoring the first goal in a 3–1 victory over Benfica. Just as Ueda was starting more games, he sustained a hamstring injury in a Eredivise game against Ajax in early November, which would rule him out for the remainder of 2024.

On 6 December 2025, he scored four goals in a 6–1 victory over PEC Zwolle, bringing his tally to 18 goals in 15 matches in the 2025–26 season, which marked his best scoring run ever in the Eredivisie. He finished the season as the top scorer in the Eredivisie, scoring 25 goals in 31 league games and becoming only the seventh player in Feyenoord's history to score the most goals in a league season.

=== Lille ===
On 31 August 2026, Ueda signed a four-year contract with Ligue 1 club Lille, for a reported fee of €15 million. He made his debut on 3 September in a league match against Toulouse, where he scored the only goal of the game after coming on as a second-half substitute.

== International career ==
=== Youth career ===
In November 2017 whilst still at Hosei University, Ueda received his first national team call up to represent the U-20 team at the friendly M-150 Cup competition. He made his first appearance as a substitute in a 2–1 defeat to Thailand, but scored twice on his first start in a 4–0 win over North Korea. Japan played Uzbekistan in the final where Ueda played the whole game which ended in a 2–2 draw and was decided on penalties. Ueda missed Japan's final penalty in the shootout to hand the tournament victory to Uzbekistan.

In June 2018, Ueda was part of the Japan U-21 squad to play in the prestigious Toulon Tournament. Used as a substitute in the first two group games against Turkey and Portugal, he made a big impact in the latter scoring two goals as Japan won 3–2.

Ueda was also part of the silver medal-winning squad from the 2018 Asian Games squad in August. He appeared in six out of Japan's seven games during the tournament, including playing the full 120 minutes against South Korea in their extra time win in the gold medal match. Ueda scored three goals in the tournament, firstly a penalty in Japan's 1–0 Round of 16 win against Malaysia, then in the 1-0 semi-final win over the United Arab Emirates, with the final goal coming during extra time of the gold medal match.

Ueda also took part in the U-23 Dubai Cup for Japan U-21s in November 2018. He ended up as top scorer in the tournament, scoring a hat-trick in a 5–0 win over Kuwait and the equalising goal in a 1–1 draw with United Arab Emirates. Japan finished in second place in the tournament and Ueda was named most valuable player.

In 2019, Ueda continued to play for the U-23 squad, this time in the AFC U-23 Championship qualifiers. Japan cruised through their qualifying group, scoring 21 goals and conceding none. He scored a hat-trick in an 8–0 win over Macau and scored another in a 6–0 win over Timor-Leste. In the main competition, Japan were surprisingly knocked out at the group stage, with Ueda not able to make an impact in either of the games he appeared in.

In July 2019, Ueda was part of the Japan team to take part in the biannual Summer Universiade. He scored two goals in the first game of the competition in a 3–0 victory over Argentina. After seeing off South Korea in the quarter finals and beating Italy on penalties in the semi-final, Japan ended up winning the competition after a 4–1 victory over Brazil in the gold medal match including a hat-trick from Ueda.

In June 2021, Ueda was named in Japan's squad to play at the delayed 2020 Summer Olympic Games. He went on to make an appearance at every game during the tournament, including 90 minutes in a 4–0 win over France, and culminated in Japan finishing fourth after losing the bronze medal match 3–1 to Mexico.

=== Senior career ===
After showing a high goalscoring form for Japan's youth teams, on 24 May 2019, Ueda was called up by Japan's head coach Hajime Moriyasu to feature in the Copa América played in Brazil. At the time of his call-up, he was still playing for his university team, the first time a university player was called up since Kensuke Nagai and Kazuya Yamamura were selected in 2010. He made his debut on 17 June 2019 in a 4–0 defeat against Chile, as a starter. He went on to make two more appearances as a substitute in the competition, before Japan were knocked out at the group stage with Ueda missing some big chances throughout.

Despite his performances at Copa América, Moriyasu once again named Ueda in the Japan squad, this time for the 2019 EAFF E-1 Football Championship. He appeared in all three of Japan's games and played his first full 90 minutes in a senior international in a 2–1 victory over China PR. Japan finished runners-up in the tournament after a 1–0 defeat to South Korea in the final.

In November 2022, Ueda was called up to Japan's squad for the 2022 FIFA World Cup. He made his World Cup debut when starting in Japan's second group game against Costa Rica, however Ueda struggled to make an impact on the game and was substituted at half-time for Takuma Asano. Japan went on to lose the game 1–0 to a late Costa Rica winner. This was Ueda's first and last appearance at the 2022 World Cup as he was then unused for the rest of the tournament, as Japan got knocked out in the Round of 16 by eventual semi-finalists Croatia.

On 15 June 2023, Ueda scored his first senior international goal in a 6–0 thrashing of El Salvador in the 2023 Kirin Challenge Cup.

On 16 November 2023, Ueda scored his first international hat-trick during the 2026 FIFA World Cup qualification match against Myanmar in a 5–0 win. In January 2024, he was part of the squad that participated in the 2023 AFC Asian Cup where he scored four goals in the tournament.

On 27 May 2026, Ueda was selected in the 26-man squad for the 2026 FIFA World Cup. A month later, on 20 June, he scored his first World Cup goals, netting a brace in a 4–0 victory over Tunisia.

== Style of play ==
Jimmy De Wulf, Cercle Brugge's assistant manager described Ueda as a 'complete striker'. He has a strong finishing ability alongside a combination of pace, agility and above average jumping ability and strength given his smaller stature. Ueda also impressed at Feyenoord with his leap and heading ability.

== Career statistics ==
=== Club ===
As of match played 13 October 2026

Appearances and goals by club, season and competition
Club	Season	League			National cup (Note: Includes Emperor's Cup, Belgian Cup, KNVB Cup)		League cup (Note: Includes J. League Cup)		Continental		Other		Total	
Club	Season	Division	Apps	Goals	Apps	Goals	Apps	Goals	Apps	Goals	Apps	Goals	Apps	Goals
Kashima Antlers	2019	J1 League	13	4	0	0	2	0	2 (Note: Appearances in AFC Champions League)	0	—		17	4
Kashima Antlers	2020	J1 League	26	10	0	0	1	0	0	0	—		27	10
Kashima Antlers	2021	J1 League	29	14	3	3	4	2	—		—		36	19
Kashima Antlers	2022	J1 League	18	10	1	1	4	3	—		—		23	14
Kashima Antlers	Total		86	38	4	4	11	5	2	0	—		103	47
Cercle Brugge KSV	2022–23	Belgian Pro League	40	22	2	1	—		—		—		42	23
Cercle Brugge KSV	Total		40	22	2	1	—		—		—		42	23
Feyenoord	2023–24	Eredivisie	26	5	4	0	—		7 (Note: Five appearances in UEFA Champions League, two appearances in UEFA Europa League)	0	0	0	37	5
Feyenoord	2024–25	Eredivisie	21	7	1	0	—		8 (Note: Appearances in UEFA Champions League)	2	1 (Note: Appearance in Johan Cruyff Shield)	0	31	9
Feyenoord	2025–26	Eredivisie	31	25	1	0	—		8 (Note: Two appearances in UEFA Champions League, six appearances and one goal in UEFA Europa League)	1	—		40	26
Feyenoord	2026–27	Eredivisie	4	3	—		—		—		—		4	3
Feyenoord	Total		82	40	6	0	—		23	3	1	0	112	43
Lille	2026–27	Ligue 1	4	2	0	0	—		2	1	—		6	3
Career total			212	102	12	5	11	5	27	4	1	0	263	116

=== International ===
As of match played 5 October 2026

Appearances and goals by national team and year
National team	Year	Apps	Goals
Japan	2019	6	0
Japan	2022	6	0
Japan	2023	7	7
Japan	2024	12	7
Japan	2025	6	2
Japan	2026	10	6
Total		47	22

Scores and results list Japan's goal tally first, score column indicates score after each Ueda goal.

List of international goals scored by Ayase Ueda
No.	Date	Venue	Cap	Opponent	Score	Result	Competition	Ref.
1	15 June 2023	Toyota Stadium, Toyota, Japan	15	El Salvador	2–0	6–0	2023 Kirin Challenge Cup	
2	9 September 2023	Volkswagen Arena, Wolfsburg, Germany	16	Germany	2–1	4–1	Friendly	
3	16 November 2023	Panasonic Stadium Suita, Suita, Japan	18	Myanmar	1–0	5–0	2026 FIFA World Cup qualification	
4	16 November 2023	Panasonic Stadium Suita, Suita, Japan	18	Myanmar	3–0	5–0	2026 FIFA World Cup qualification	
5	16 November 2023	Panasonic Stadium Suita, Suita, Japan	18	Myanmar	4–0	5–0	2026 FIFA World Cup qualification	
6	21 November 2023	Prince Abdullah Al Faisal Stadium, Jeddah, Saudi Arabia	19	Syria	2–0	5–0	2026 FIFA World Cup qualification	
7	21 November 2023	Prince Abdullah Al Faisal Stadium, Jeddah, Saudi Arabia	19	Syria	3–0	5–0	2026 FIFA World Cup qualification	
8	14 January 2024	Al Thumama Stadium, Doha, Qatar	20	Vietnam	4–2	4–2	2023 AFC Asian Cup	
9	24 January 2024	Al Thumama Stadium, Doha, Qatar	22	Indonesia	1–0	3–1	2023 AFC Asian Cup	
10	24 January 2024	Al Thumama Stadium, Doha, Qatar	22	Indonesia	2–0	3–1	2023 AFC Asian Cup	
11	31 January 2024	Al Thumama Stadium, Doha, Qatar	23	Bahrain	3–1	3–1	2023 AFC Asian Cup	
12	11 June 2024	Edion Peace Wing Hiroshima, Hiroshima, Japan	26	Syria	1–0	5–0	2026 FIFA World Cup qualification	
13	10 September 2024	Bahrain National Stadium, Riffa, Bahrain	28	Bahrain	1–0	5–0	2026 FIFA World Cup qualification	
14	10 September 2024	Bahrain National Stadium, Riffa, Bahrain	28	Bahrain	2–0	5–0	2026 FIFA World Cup qualification	
15	10 October 2025	Suita City Football Stadium, Suita, Japan	33	Paraguay	2–2	2–2	2025 Kirin Challenge Cup	
16	14 October 2025	Ajinomoto Stadium, Chōfu, Japan	34	Brazil	3–2	3–2	2025 Kirin Challenge Cup	
17	20 June 2026	Estadio BBVA, Guadalupe, Mexico	41	Tunisia	2–0	4–0	2026 FIFA World Cup	
18	20 June 2026	Estadio BBVA, Guadalupe, Mexico	41	Tunisia	4–0	4–0	2026 FIFA World Cup	
19	24 September 2026	Q&A Stadium, Rifu, Japan	44	Uruguay	3–1	3–1	2026 Kirin Challenge Cup	
20	28 September 2026	Edion Peace Wing Hiroshima, Hiroshima, Japan	45	Venezuela	1–1	2–1	2026 Kirin Challenge Cup	
21	28 September 2026	Edion Peace Wing Hiroshima, Hiroshima, Japan	45	Venezuela	2–1	2–1	2026 Kirin Challenge Cup	
22	5 October 2026	National Stadium, Tokyo, Japan	47	New Zealand	1–0	2–1	2026 Kirin Cup Soccer	

== Honours ==
Feyenoord

- KNVB Cup: 2023–24
- Johan Cruyff Shield: 2024

Japan Universiade

- Summer Universiade: 2019

Individual

- Japan Pro-Footballers Association Best XI: 2023, 2024, 2025
- Japan Pro-Footballers Association Player of the Year: 2025
- Eredivisie Player of the Month: October 2025
- Eredivisie top scorer: 2025–26
- Eredivisie Team of the Season:2025–26
