= Juan Alano =

Brazilian footballer (born 1996)

Personal information
- Full name: Juan Matheus Alano Nascimento
- Date of birth: 2 September 1996 (age 30)
- Place of birth: Curitiba, Brazil
- Height: 1.72 m (5 ft 8 in)
- Position: Winger

Team information
- Current team: Sport Recife
- Number: 8

Youth career
- Trieste Futebol Clube, Paraná
- 2011–2016: Internacional

Senior career*
Years	Team	Apps	(Gls)
2017–2019	Internacional	21	(0)
2019	→ Coritiba (loan)	33	(5)
2020–2022	Kashima Antlers	69	(8)
2022–2025	Gamba Osaka	98	(11)
2026	Ceará	18	(3)
2026–	Sport Recife	11	(0)
- * Club domestic league appearances and goals as of 17 November 2026

Juan Matheus Alano Nascimento commonly known as Juan Alano (born 2 September 1996), is a Brazilian professional footballer who plays as a winger for Sport Recife.

== Career ==
=== Internacional ===
Starting his career with Trieste Futebol Clube in his home state of Paraná, Alano spent his youth football career with Internacional, joining them in 2011 at U-15 level. Working his way through the various age groups, he impressed Internacional B team coach Ricardo Colbachini who described him as an intelligent player who is a quality passer. He made his first-team debut in the now defunct Primeira Liga in 2017, appearing as a 71st minute substitute in a 3-1 win over Criciúma. He went on to make 15 appearances in his debut season for the club, the majority of those in the league and all of them coming from the bench. It wasn't until the 2018 season though until he was handed his first start, this coming in a 2-1 league win over Athletico Paranaense due to a suspension to teammate Edenílson.

=== Loan to Coritiba ===
After struggling to break into the first team at Internacional, on 30 January 2019 Alano was loaned out to Série B club Coritiba until the end of the year. He made 44 appearances across all competitions and helped them secure a third place finish in the league and promotion to Série A. During this season he scored his first professional goal, scoring in a 3-2 league defeat to Paraná.

=== Kashima Antlers ===
Despite a successful season with Coritiba, Alano was surplus to requirements at Internacional and on 16 December 2019, Alano was sold to Kashima Antlers for a fee of €1.4m. Kashima handed him the number 7 shirt. There he would join fellow countrymen Léo Silva and Everaldo and was coached by Antônio Carlos Zago. Alano made 33 appearances in all competitions in his debut Kashima season, employed mainly as a right midfielder. He made his debut in a 3-0 league defeat to Sanfrecce Hiroshima, and scored his first goal in a 2-1 win over FC Tokyo with a powerful left footed finish. He also made his first ever appearance in a continental competition, playing 90 minutes in a 1-0 defeat to Melbourne Victory in the 2020 AFC Champions League. Alano went on to play another 52 games for Kashima Antlers over the following two seasons, scoring a total of 9 goals for the club.

=== Gamba Osaka ===
In July 2022, it was announced that Alano would be joining fellow J.League club Gamba Osaka.

== Career statistics ==
As of match played 27 September 2025.

Appearances and goals by club, season and competition
Club	Season	League			State League		National cup		League cup		Continental		Other		Total	
Club	Season	Division	Apps	Goals	Apps	Goals	Apps	Goals	Apps	Goals	Apps	Goals	Apps	Goals	Apps	Goals
Internacional	2017	Série B	12	0	1	0	—		—		—		2 (Note: Includes 2017 Primeira Liga and Brasileiro de Aspirantes)	0	15	0
Internacional	2018	Série A	9	0	7	0	2	0	—		—		1 (Note: Includes 2018 Brasileiro de Aspirantes)	0	19	0
Internacional	2019	Série A	—		1	0	—		—		—		—		1	0
Internacional	Total		21	0	9	0	2	0	—		—		3	0	35	0
Coritiba (loan)	2019	Série B	33	5	10	0	1	0	—		—		—		44	5
Kashima Antlers	2020	J1 League	30	4	—		—		2	0	1	0	—		33	4
Kashima Antlers	2021	J1 League	27	3	—		2	0	4	1	—		—		33	4
Kashima Antlers	2022	J1 League	12	1	—		3	0	4	0	—		—		19	1
Kashima Antlers	Total		69	8	—		5	0	10	1	1	0	—		85	9
Gamba Osaka	2022	J1 League	11	1	—		—		—		—		—		11	1
Gamba Osaka	2023	J1 League	28	7	—		1	0	7	0	—		—		36	7
Gamba Osaka	2024	J1 League	20	1	—		3	0	0	0	—		—		23	1
Gamba Osaka	2025	J1 League	27	1	—		2	0	3	1	—		—		32	2
Gamba Osaka	Total		86	10	—		6	0	10	1	—		—		102	11
Career total			196	19	19	0	11	0	16	2	1	0	3	0	236	23
