= Arthur Caíke =

Brazilian footballer (born 1992)

Personal information
- Full name: Arthur Caíke do Nascimento Cruz
- Date of birth: 15 June 1992 (age 34)
- Place of birth: Barbalha, Brazil
- Height: 1.74 m (5 ft 9 in)
- Positions: Winger; forward

Team information
- Current team: Botafogo-SP
- Number: 18

Youth career
- Iraty

Senior career*
Years	Team	Apps	(Gls)
2010–2011	Iraty	20	(2)
2012–2017	Londrina	56	(20)
2012	→ Paraná (loan)	33	(9)
2013	→ Coritiba (loan)	23	(4)
2013	→ Figueirense (loan)	8	(0)
2014	→ Flamengo (loan)	12	(0)
2015	→ Atlético Goianiense (loan)	35	(12)
2016	→ Santa Cruz (loan)	51	(9)
2017	→ Chapecoense (loan)	50	(11)
2018	Chapecoense	20	(4)
2018	Pyramids	0	(0)
2018–2021	Al-Shabab	15	(6)
2019–2020	→ Bahia (loan)	43	(7)
2020–2021	→ Cruzeiro (loan)	24	(4)
2021–2023	Kashima Antlers	56	(16)
2024	Sport Recife	8	(2)
2024	Criciúma	33	(5)
2025	Goiás	34	(3)
2026–	Botafogo-SP	4	(0)
- * Club domestic league appearances and goals as of 19 June 2026

Arthur Caíke do Nascimento Cruz (born 15 June 1992), known as Arthur Caíke or simply Arthur, is a Brazilian professional footballer who plays as a winger or a forward for Brazilian club Botafogo-SP.

== Career ==
=== Early career ===
Born in Barbalha, Ceará, Arthur made his senior debut for Iraty in 2010 – a 2–2 Série D draw with Pelotas. He scored his first professional goal the following season, in a 2–0 Campeonato Paranaense win over J. Malucelli.

=== Londrina and loan spells ===
In 2011, he moved to Paraná club Londrina and scored seven goals in seven games in the Campeonato Paranaense second division and went on to score a further four goals the following season in the Campeonato Paranaense.

During the 2012 season, Arthur began the first of a number of loan spells from Londrina, starting with Paraná in Série B, followed by spending the majority of the 2013 season with Coritiba – his first appearances in the top-flight of Brazilian football. He scored his first Série A goal with a 90th-minute winner against Atletico Mineiro in a 2–1 victory for Coritiba. He also won his first silverware with the club, making 15 appearances and scoring three goals in their victorious 2013 Campeonato Paranaense campaign.

Following a brief loan spell with Figueirense in Série B for the end of the 2013 season, Arthur returned to his parent club Londrina for the start of the 2014 season. Making 16 appearances and scoring eight goals, he helped Londrina win their first Campeonato Paranaense since 1992, including scoring a hat-trick in the second leg of the semi-final to knock out Athletico Paranaense 5–4 on aggregate, overturning a 3–1 deficit from the first leg. Despite not scoring in the final against Maringá, he did convert his penalty in the penalty shootout to decide the winner of the competition. His form for Londrina earned him a loan move to Série A club Flamengo for the remainder of the 2014 season, making his debut for the club in May 2014 against Fluminense FC in a 2–0 away defeat.

The following season, Arthur returned again to play for Londrina in the 2015 Campeonato Paranaense, but could only help them to a third place finish after getting knocked out at the semi-final stage by former club Coritiba. This is the last time that Arthur represented Londrina, as he then went out on loan to Atlético Goianiense for the remainder of the 2015 season, followed by spending a full season out on loan to Santa Cruz in Série A, where Arthur made 54 appearances in all competitions. With Santa Cruz, Arthur won the 2016 Copa do Nordeste, where he scored the winning goal in the second leg of the final against Campinense, equalising to make it 1–1 and 3–2 on aggregate. Santa Cruz also won the 2016 Campeonato Pernambucano where Arthur scored twice in their semi-final 5–2 aggregate victory over Náutico. They then went on to beat Sport Recife 1–0 on aggregate in the final.

=== Chapecoense ===
In 2017, following the 2016 plane crash in which the majority of the first-team squad of Chapecoense died, Arthur was one of the many players that moved on loan to the club for the 2017 season. He went on to make 63 appearances across all competitions and was a key member of the team that won the 2017 Campeonato Catarinense. He also scored his first goal in a continental competition, with a 90th minute goal against Zulia in the group stages of the Copa Libertadores. Arthur was then signed on a permanent basis and was contracted until 2021, although after only making 23 appearances in 2018 he was sold to Saudi Arabian club Al Shabab for the 2018–19 season.

=== Al Shabab ===
Arthur scored his first goal for Al Shabab in September 2018, in a 3–1 league win away at Al-Fayha. He went on to only make 15 appearances for Al Shabab, scoring six goals, before moving back to Brazil in 2019 to join Bahia on loan.

=== Loans to Bahia and Cruzeiro ===
Arthur had a successful spell at Bahia, appearing 46 times and scoring nine goals, six of those coming in Série A. Bahia also won the 2019 Campeonato Baiano, where Arthur played five games, including both of legs of the final against Bahia de Feira.

Arthur started the 2020 season back on loan at Bahia, but eventually ended up on loan with Cruzeiro in Série B. After making 25 appearances and scoring four goals, his contract was mutually ended with the club before the end of the season and in January 2021 it was announced he was joining J1 League club Kashima Antlers.

=== Kashima Antlers ===
Despite the J1 League season beginning in February, due to the COVID-19 pandemic Arthur was only allowed to enter Japan on 8 April and after training in isolation for a number of weeks it wasn't until 19 May that he made his debut for Kashima in a 0–0 J.League Cup draw with Consadole Sapporo. His home league debut arrived the following week, coming on as a late substitute in a 1–0 win over Cerezo Osaka. Arthur scored his first goal for Kashima in July, a 90th-minute goal after coming on as a late substitute in a 3–0 win over Tochigi SC in the third round of the Emperor's Cup. Despite missing a large portion of the season, he ended up scoring seven goals in 22 appearances across all competitions. Arthur played a key part in Kashima's fourth place finish in the 2022 J1 League season, with the second most goals and the third most assists in the team across all competitions. In the 2023 season, Caíke found himself unfavoured by manager Daiki Iwamasa and only started four games throughout the season. He managed to score five goals in eighteen appearances. At the end of the season, Caíke was released by Kashima.

=== Sport Recife ===
Shortly after leaving Kashima in December 2023, Caíke was signed by Brazilian club Sport Recife for the 2024 season.

== Career statistics ==
As of 3 December 2023.

Appearances and goals by club, season and competition
Club	Season	League			National cup (Note: Includes Copa do Brasil.)		League cup		Continental		State League		Other		Total	
Club	Season	Division	Apps	Goals	Apps	Goals	Apps	Goals	Apps	Goals	Apps	Goals	Apps	Goals	Apps	Goals
Iraty	2010	Série D	2	0	–		–		–		–		–		2	0
Iraty	2011	Série D	–		2	0	–		–		18 (Note: Appearances in Campeonato Paranaense)	2	–		20	2
Iraty	Total		2	0	2	0	0	0	0	0	18	2	0	0	22	2
Londrina	2011	Paranaense 2	–		–		–		–		7 (Note: Appearances in Campeonato Paranaense 2)	7	–		7	7
Londrina	2012	Campeonato Paranaense	–		–		–		–		17	4	–		17	4
Londrina	Total		0	0	0	0	0	0	0	0	24	11	0	0	24	11
Paraná (loan)	2012	Série B	33	9	–		–		–		–		–		33	9
Coritiba (loan)	2013	Série A	8	1	1	0	–		2 (Note: Appearances in Copa Sudamericana)	0	15	3	–		26	4
Figueirense (loan)	2013	Série B	8	0	–		–		–		–		–		8	0
Londrina	2014	Campeonato Paranaense	–		1	2	–		–		16	8	–		17	10
Flamengo (loan)	2014	Série A	12	0	–		–		–		–		–		12	0
Londrina	2015	Campeonato Paranaense	–		2	0	–		–		16	1	–		18	1
Atlético Goianiense (loan)	2015	Série B	35	12	–		–		–		–		–		35	12
Santa Cruz (loan)	2016	Série A	36	6	2	1	–		2	0	7 (Note: Appearances in Campeonato Pernambucano)	0	7 (Note: Appearances in Copa do Nordeste)	1	54	8
Chapecoense (loan)	2017	Série A	34	8	2	0	–		11 (Note: Appearances in Copa Libertadores, Copa Sudamericana, Recopa Sudamericana and J.League Cup / Copa Sudamericana Championship)	1	14 (Note: Appearances in Campeonato Catarinense)	3	2 (Note: Appearances in 2017 Primeira Liga)	0	63	12
Chapecoense	2018	Série A	11	4	2	0	–		1 (Note: Appearances in 2018 Copa Libertadores)	0	9	0	–		23	4
Al Shabab	2018–19	Saudi Professional League	15	6	–		–		–		–		–		15	6
Bahia (loan)	2019	Série A	29	6	6	2	–		2	0	5 (Note: Appearances in Campeonato Baiano)	1	4	0	46	9
Bahia (loan)	2020	Série A	–		1	0	–		2	0	–		5	0	8	0
Bahia (loan)	Total		29	6	7	2	0	0	4	0	5	1	9	0	54	9
Cruzeiro (loan)	2020	Série B	25	4	–		–		–		–		–		25	4
Kashima Antlers	2021	J1 League	14	5	4 (Note: Appearances in the Emperor's Cup)	2	4 (Note: Appearances in the J. League Cup)	0	–		–		–		22	7
Kashima Antlers	2022	J1 League	29	9	3	0	6	2	–		–		–		38	11
Kashima Antlers	2023	J1 League	13	2	1	1	4	2	–		–		–		18	5
Kashima Antlers	Total		56	16	8	3	14	4	0	0	0	0	0	0	78	23
Career total			304	72	27	8	14	4	20	1	124	29	18	1	507	115

== Honours ==
Coritiba

- Campeonato Paranaense: 2013

Londrina

- Campeonato Paranaense: 2014

Santa Cruz

- Copa do Nordeste: 2016
- Campeonato Pernambucano: 2016

Chapecoense

- Campeonato Catarinense: 2017

Bahia

- Campeonato Baiano: 2019

Sport

- Campeonato Pernambucano: 2024
