= Itsuki Someno =

Japanese footballer

Itsuki Someno 染野 唯月
Personal information
- Full name: Itsuki Someno
- Date of birth: 21 September 2001 (age 25)
- Place of birth: Ryugasaki, Ibaraki, Japan
- Height: 1.81 m (5 ft 11 in)
- Positions: Forward; winger

Team information
- Current team: Tokyo Verdy
- Number: 9

Youth career
- Kashima Antlers
- 2017–2019: Shoshi High School

Senior career*
Years	Team	Apps	(Gls)
2020–2024	Kashima Antlers	38	(1)
2022–2024	→ Tokyo Verdy (loan)	72	(17)
2025–	Tokyo Verdy	55	(9)

International career^{‡}
2019	Japan U18	2	(0)
- * Club domestic league appearances and goals as of 8 August 2026 ‡ National team caps and goals as of 10:01, 4 July 2020 (UTC)

Itsuki Someno (染野 唯月, Someno Itsuki; born 12 September 2001) is a Japanese professional footballer who plays as a forward or a winger for J1 League club Tokyo Verdy.

== Early life ==
Someno was born in Ibaraki, Japan.

== Career ==
Someno made his debut for Kashima Antlers on the 4th of July 2020, coming on in the 72nd minute against Kawasaki Frontale for Ryuji Izumi.

Someno joined Tokyo Verdy on loan in the middle of the 2022 season, and again in the 2023 season. In December 2023, the initial half-season loan was extended to cover the 2024 season.

In December 2024, it was announced that Someno would join Tokyo Verdy on a permanent transfer.

== Career statistics ==
=== Club ===
As of end of 2024 season.

Appearances and goals by club, season and competition
Club	Season	League			National cup		League cup		Other		Total	
Club	Season	Division	Apps	Goals	Apps	Goals	Apps	Goals	Apps	Goals	Apps	Goals
Japan			League		Emperor's Cup		J. League Cup		Other		Total	
Kashima Antlers	2020	J1 League	12	0	0	0	1	1	–		13	1
Kashima Antlers	2021	J1 League	9	0	0	0	5	1	–		14	1
Kashima Antlers	2022	J1 League	12	1	1	1	8	2	–		21	4
Kashima Antlers	2023	J1 League	5	0	1	1	3	1	–		9	2
Kashima Antlers	Total		38	1	2	2	17	5	0	0	57	8
Tokyo Verdy (loan)	2022	J2 League	16	4	0	0	–		–		16	4
Tokyo Verdy (loan)	2023	J2 League	18	6	0	0	–		2 (Note: Appearances in J1/J2 play-offs)	1	20	7
Tokyo Verdy (loan)	2024	J1 League	36	6	2	0	0	0	–		38	6
Tokyo Verdy (loan)	Total		70	16	2	0	0	0	2	1	74	17
Career total			108	17	4	2	17	5	2	1	131	25
