= Toshio Shimakawa =

Japanese footballer

Toshio Shimakawa 島川 俊郎
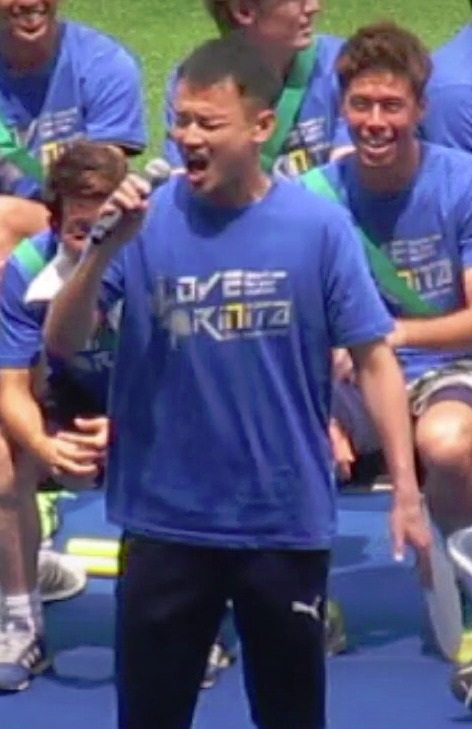

Personal information
- Full name: Toshio Shimakawa
- Date of birth: 28 May 1990 (age 36)
- Place of birth: Ichikawa, Chiba, Japan
- Height: 1.80 m (5 ft 11 in)
- Positions: Defensive midfielder; centre back

Team information
- Current team: SC Sagamihara
- Number: 4

Youth career
- 2003–2008: Kashiwa Reysol

Senior career*
Years	Team	Apps	(Gls)
2009–2013	Vegalta Sendai	0	(0)
2012	→ Tokyo Verdy (loan)	0	(0)
2012–2013	→ Blaublitz Akita (loan)	27	(0)
2014–2015	Blaublitz Akita	67	(1)
2016	Renofa Yamaguchi	2	(0)
2016	→ Tochigi SC (loan)	11	(3)
2017–2018	Ventforet Kofu	27	(2)
2019-2020	Oita Trinita	52	(2)
2021–2023	Sagan Tosu	39	(0)
2024	Tokushima Vortis	7	(0)
2024	Taichung Futuro	12	(1)
2025–	Sagamihara	49	(3)
Total		293	(12)
- * Club domestic league appearances and goals as of 17 August 2026

Toshio Shimakawa (島川 俊郎, Shimakawa Toshio; born 28 May 1990) is a Japanese professional footballer who is currently playing for SC Sagamihara, as a defensive midfielder or a centre back.

== Career ==
In 2009, Shimakawa started his professional career at Vegalta Sendai but never ended up making an appearance for the club. He made his debut whilst on loan at JFL club Blaublitz Akita in the 2012 season. Shimakawa played for two seasons on loan at Blaublitz Akita before joining them permanently ahead of the 2014 season, the club's first in the J3 League. He scored his first professional goal in the 2015 season.

Moves to a number of clubs followed and Shimakawa played in the top-flight of Japanese football for Ventforet Kofu, Oita Trinita and Sagan Tosu.

In 2024, he joined J2 League club Tokushima Vortis but announced his retirement just two months after the start of the season in April. He made 274 appearances, scoring 9 goals in a career spanning 14 years.

== Career statistics ==
Appearances and goals by club, season and competition
Club	Season	League			National Cup		League Cup		Other		Total	
Club	Season	Division	Apps	Goals	Apps	Goals	Apps	Goals	Apps	Goals	Apps	Goals
Japan			League		Emperor's Cup		J. League Cup		Other		Total	
Vegalta Sendai	2010	J1 League	0	0	0	0	0	0	–		0	0
Vegalta Sendai	2011	J1 League	0	0	0	0	0	0	–		0	0
Vegalta Sendai	2013	J1 League	0	0	0	0	0	0	–		0	0
Vegalta Sendai	Total		0	0	0	0	0	0	0	0	0	0
Tokyo Verdy (loan)	2012	J2 League	0	0	0	0	–		–		0	0
Blaublitz Akita (loan)	2012	JFL	12	0	2	0	–		–		14	0
Blaublitz Akita (loan)	2013	JFL	15	0	2	0	–		–		17	0
Blaublitz Akita (loan)	Total		27	0	4	0	0	0	0	0	31	0
Blaublitz Akita	2014	J3 League	32	0	2	0	–		–		34	0
Blaublitz Akita	2015	J3 League	35	1	2	1	–		–		37	2
Blaublitz Akita	Total		67	1	4	1	0	0	0	0	71	2
Renofa Yamaguchi	2016	J2 League	2	0	0	0	–		–		2	0
Tochigi SC (loan)	2016	J3 League	11	3	0	0	–		2 (Note: Appearances in promotion/relegation series)	0	13	3
Ventforet Kofu	2017	J1 League	13	0	1	0	5	0	–		19	0
Ventforet Kofu	2018	J2 League	14	2	0	0	3	0	–		17	2
Ventforet Kofu	Total		27	2	1	0	8	0	0	0	36	2
Oita Trinita	2019	J1 League	22	0	4	0	2	0	–		28	0
Oita Trinita	2020	J1 League	30	2	0	0	0	0	–		30	2
Oita Trinita	Total		52	2	4	0	2	0	0	0	58	2
Sagan Tosu	2021	J1 League	26	0	2	0	3	0	–		31	0
Sagan Tosu	2022	J1 League	9	0	2	0	3	0	–		14	0
Sagan Tosu	2023	J1 League	4	0	2	0	5	0	–		11	0
Sagan Tosu	Total		39	0	6	0	11	0	0	0	56	0
Tokushima Vortis	2024	J2 League	7	0	0	0	0	0	–		7	0
Career total			232	8	19	1	21	0	2	0	274	9
