= Ryuji Izumi =

Japanese footballer

Personal information
- Full name: Ryuji Izumi
- Date of birth: 6 November 1993 (age 33)
- Place of birth: Yokkaichi, Mie, Japan
- Height: 1.73 m (5 ft 8 in)
- Position: Winger

Team information
- Current team: Nagoya Grampus
- Number: 7

Youth career
- FC Yokkaichi
- 2009–2011: Ichiritsu Funabashi High School

College career
Years	Team	Apps	(Gls)
2012–2015	Meiji University		

Senior career*
Years	Team	Apps	(Gls)
2016–2019	Nagoya Grampus	116	(10)
2020–2022	Kashima Antlers	80	(5)
2023–	Nagoya Grampus	111	(101)
- * Club domestic league appearances and goals as of 12 August 2026

Ryuji Izumi (和泉 竜司, Izumi Ryūji; born 6 November 1993) is a Japanese footballer who plays as a winger for J1 League club Nagoya Grampus.

== Youth career ==
=== Ichiritsu Funabashi High School ===
Representing Ichiritsu Funabashi High School, Izumi captained the side that won the 2011 All Japan High School Soccer Tournament, scoring two goals in the final itself and was voted the MVP of the tournament. After the tournament, it was said that Izumi had "beautiful technique and superb judgement", with expectations high for his future career. Playing as a forward, he scored 13 goals in 15 games for his school.

=== Meiji University ===
Izumi then went on to play for Meiji University, where he played a number of different positions in his four years. He was the team's top scorer in both his second and fourth years, ending with an impressive 41 goals in 83 appearances for his university overall. He also was chosen as part of the Best XI in the JUFA Kanto League 1 in his final year. In 2015, he represented Japan at University level at the FISU Summer Universiade in Gwangju – where he played 5 games and scored one goal.

== Club career ==
=== Nagoya Grampus ===
In September 2015, Izumi was chosen as a designated special player by Nagoya Grampus for the season from Meiji University, although he did not end up making an appearance for the team. After graduation, Izumi received offers from a number of clubs but chose to go to continue with Nagoya Grampus due to its proximity to his hometown. Izumi was handed the number 29 shirt for his first professional season. He made his debut in March 2016, playing 90 minutes in a 1-0 defeat to Omiya Ardija in the J.League Cup. He also scored his first professional goal in his debut season, scoring in a 3-1 league win over Yokohama F. Marinos. Unfortunately it was not a successful season for Nagoya, as they were relegated to the J2 League.

In the 2017 season, Izumi played in almost every match for Nagoya, playing over 3000 minutes across the season. He was used as a utility player, being played in a number of different positions throughout the season including centre back, left back, wing back, left midfield and attacking midfield. Nagoya bounced straight back to the J1 League, after finishing in 3rd position and being promoted via the playoffs after a 0-0 draw with Avispa Fukuoka – Nagoya were promoted due to their higher league position.

For the next two seasons, Izumi continued to be used as a utility player but was still making many appearances, playing 32 league games in 2018 as Nagoya narrowly avoided relegation with 5 teams finishing on the same number of points. He played a further 37 games in the 2019 season, where he contributed 6 goals, including a brace in their 3-0 league win over Kawasaki Frontale.

=== Kashima Antlers ===
In January 2020, it was announced that Izumi would be joining Kashima Antlers and would take the number 11 shirt. Kashima had been interested in Izumi since his time at Meiji University, with Kashima's chief scout Kuniichi Shiimoto appreciating his versatility by describing him as a 'player who can do anything'. Izumi himself stated his desire to become a central figure in the team. He made his debut for the club in the same month, starting on the left-wing in the AFC Champions League qualifying play-offs, where Kashima fell to a 1-0 defeat to Melbourne Victory. He went on to make 30 appearances across all competitions in his debut season for Kashima, as they achieved a 5th place league finish.

Izumi made 99 appearances over three seasons for Kashima as he helped them to two fourth-placed league finishes in 2021 and 2022. He scored seven goals in his time at the club.

=== Return to Nagoya Grampus ===
In December 2022, it was announced that Izumi would be rejoining Nagoya Grampus for the 2023 season.

== Career statistics ==
As of 9 November 2022

Appearances and goals by club, season and competition
Club	Season	League			National Cup		League Cup		Other		Total	
Club	Season	Division	Apps	Goals	Apps	Goals	Apps	Goals	Apps	Goals	Apps	Goals
Japan			League		Emperor's Cup		J. League Cup		Other		Total	
Nagoya Grampus	2016	J1 League	14	1	1	0	2	0	-		17	1
Nagoya Grampus	2017	J2 League	39	1	2	0	-		2 (Note: Appearances in the J1 League Promotion Playoffs)	0	43	1
Nagoya Grampus	2018	J1 League	32	2	2	0	3	0	-		37	2
Nagoya Grampus	2019	J1 League	31	6	0	0	6	0	-		37	6
Nagoya Grampus	Total		116	10	5	0	11	0	2	0	134	10
Kashima Antlers	2020	J1 League	27	3	0	0	2	0	1 (Note: Appearances in the AFC Champions League)	0	30	3
Kashima Antlers	2021	J1 League	23	1	3	0	3	1	-		29	2
Kashima Antlers	2022	J1 League	30	1	3	1	7	0	-		40	2
Kashima Antlers	Total		80	5	6	1	12	1	1	0	99	7
Career total			196	15	11	1	23	1	3	0	233	17

== Honours ==
Nagoya Grampus

- J.League Cup: 2024
