= Yuto Hiratsuka =

Japanese footballer

Yuto Hiratsuka 平塚 悠知
Personal information
- Full name: Yuto Hiratsuka
- Date of birth: 13 April 1996 (age 30)
- Place of birth: Hokkaido, Japan
- Height: 1.75 m (5 ft 9 in)
- Position: Midfielder

Team information
- Current team: Ventforet Kofu
- Number: 25

Youth career
- T Unity FC
- North Shonan SS
- 2012–2014: Otani Muroran High School

College career
Years	Team	Apps	(Gls)
2015–2018	Sapporo University		

Senior career*
Years	Team	Apps	(Gls)
2019–2022	Mito HollyHock	76	(2)
2022–2024	Avispa Fukuoka	15	(1)
2025–	Ventforet Kofu	27	(0)
- * Club domestic league appearances and goals as of 17 August 2026

Yuto Hiratsuka (平塚 悠知, Hiratsuka Yūto; born 13 April 1996) is a Japanese footballer who plays as a midfielder for J2 League club Ventforet Kofu.

== Career ==
Hiratsuka made his league debut for Mito against Ehime on the 25 May 2019. He scored his first goal for the club against Giravanz Kitakyushu on the 25 November 2020.

On his league debut for Avispa, Hiratsuka scored an own goal against Kashima Antlers on the 14 August 2022. He scored his first goal for the club against Nagoya Grampus on the 3 September 2022, scoring in the 57th minute.

After leaving Avispa at the end of the 2024 season, in late December 2024 it was announced that Hiratsuka would be joining J2 League club Ventforet Kofu ahead of the 2025 season.

== Career statistics ==
=== Club ===
As of end of 2024 season.

Appearances and goals by club, season and competition
Club	Season	League			National Cup		League Cup		Other		Total	
Club	Season	Division	Apps	Goals	Apps	Goals	Apps	Goals	Apps	Goals	Apps	Goals
Japan			League		Emperor's Cup		League Cup		Other		Total	
Mito Hollyhock	2019	J2 League	7	0	2	0	-		-		9	0
Mito Hollyhock	2020	J2 League	24	2	0	0	-		-		24	2
Mito Hollyhock	2021	J2 League	21	0	1	0	-		-		22	0
Mito Hollyhock	2022	J2 League	24	0	1	0	-		-		25	0
Mito Hollyhock	Total		76	2	4	0	0	0	0	0	80	2
Avispa Fukuoka	2022	J1 League	4	1	0	0	2	0	-		6	1
Avispa Fukuoka	2023	J1 League	5	0	3	0	4	0	-		12	0
Avispa Fukuoka	2024	J1 League	6	0	1	0	1	0	-		8	0
Avispa Fukuoka	Total		15	1	4	0	7	0	0	0	26	1
Career Total			91	3	8	0	7	0	0	0	106	3

== Honours ==
Avispa Fukuoka

- J.League Cup: 2023
