= Kazune Kubota =

Japanese footballer

Kazune Kubota 久保田 和音
Personal information
- Full name: Kazune Kubota
- Date of birth: 1 January 1997 (age 29)
- Place of birth: Toyohashi, Aichi, Japan
- Height: 1.70 m (5 ft 7 in)
- Position: Midfielder

Team information
- Current team: Reilac Shiga FC
- Number: 7

Youth career
- FC Progress
- –2012: FC Toyohashi Dumilan
- 2012–2014: Osaka Kirikage High School

Senior career*
Years	Team	Apps	(Gls)
2015–2019	Kashima Antlers	2	(0)
2015	→ J. League U-22 (loan)	0	(0)
2019	→ Fagiano Okayama (loan)	26	(0)
2020	Matsumoto Yamaga	25	(0)
2021–2024	Thespakusatsu Gunma	44	(2)
2023–2024	→ FC Gifu (loan)	11	(0)
2024–	Reilac Shiga FC	12	(3)

International career
2015	Japan U-18		
2018–2019	Japan U-19	15	(2)
Medal record
Kashima Antlers
Winner	AFC Champions League	2018
Winner	J1 League	2016
Runner-up	J1 League	2017
Winner	J.League Cup	2015
Winner	Emperor's Cup	2016
- * Club domestic league appearances and goals as of 24 August 2024 @ 14:01(AEST)

Kazune Kubota (久保田 和音, Kubota Kazune; born 1 January 1997) is a Japanese footballer who plays for Reilac Shiga FC.

== Career ==
Kubota joined J1 League club; Kashima Antlers on 9 September 2015, he debuted in Emperor's Cup (v FC Ryukyu).

On 25 December 2020, Kubota transferred to J2 club, Thespakusatsu Gunma from 2021.

On 17 December 2022, Kubota loan transfer to J3 club, SC Sagamihara for upcoming 2023 season.

== Career statistics ==
Updated to the end 2022 season.

=== Club ===
Club performance			League		Cup		League Cup		Continental		Total	
Season	Club	League	Apps	Goals	Apps	Goals	Apps	Goals	Apps	Goals	Apps	Goals
Japan			League		Emperor's Cup		J. League Cup		AFC		Total	
2015	Kashima Antlers	J1 League	0	0	1	0	0	0	0	0	1	0
2016	Kashima Antlers	J1 League	0	0	0	0	1	0	–		1	0
2017	Kashima Antlers	J1 League	0	0	1	0	0	0	0	0	1	0
2018	Kashima Antlers	J1 League	2	0	0	0	0	0	0	0	2	0
2019	Avispa Fukuoka (loan)	J2 League	25	0	1	0	0	0	0	0	26	0
2020	Matsumoto Yamaga	J2 League	25	0	0	0	0	0	0	0	25	0
2021	Thespakusatsu Gunma	J2 League	33	2	3	0	0	0	0	0	36	2
2022	Thespakusatsu Gunma	J2 League	6	0	2	0	0	0	0	0	8	0
2023	FC Gifu (loan)	J3 League	0	0	0	0	0	0	0	0	0	0
Career total			91	2	8	0	1	0	0	0	100	2
