= Konosuke Nishikawa =

Japanese footballer

Personal information
- Date of birth: 11 September 2002 (age 24)
- Place of birth: Aichi, Japan
- Height: 1.80 m (5 ft 11 in)
- Position: Goalkeeper

Team information
- Current team: Mito HollyHock
- Number: 34

Youth career
- Grampus Miyoshi
- –2017: Sylphid FC
- 2018–2020: Fujieda Higashi High School

Senior career*
Years	Team	Apps	(Gls)
2021–2024	Oita Trinita	34	(0)
2025–	Mito HollyHock	50	(0)

International career
2020	Japan U16		
- * Club domestic league appearances and goals as of 12 August 2026

Konosuke Nishikawa (西川 幸之介, Nishikawa Konosuke; born 11 September 2002) is a Japanese footballer currently playing as a goalkeeper for Mito HollyHock.

== Career statistics ==
=== Club ===
As of 2 March 2022.

Club	Season	League			National Cup		League Cup		Other		Total	
Club	Season	Division	Apps	Goals	Apps	Goals	Apps	Goals	Apps	Goals	Apps	Goals
Oita Trinita	2021	J1 League	0	0	0	0	0	0	0	0	0	0
Oita Trinita	2022	J2 League	0	0	0	0	1 (Note: Appearances in the J.League Cup)	0	0	0	1	0
Career total			0	0	0	0	1	0	0	0	1	0
