= Kento Haneda =

Japanese footballer

Personal information
- Date of birth: 7 July 1997 (age 29)
- Place of birth: Shimamoto, Osaka, Japan
- Height: 1.84 m (6 ft 0 in)
- Position: Defender

Team information
- Current team: FC Gifu
- Number: 27

Youth career
- Shimamoto FC
- Senrioka FC
- 2013–2015: Konko Osaka High School

College career
| Years | Team | Apps | (Gls) |
| 2016–2019 | Kansai University | | |

Senior career*
| Years | Team | Apps | (Gls) |
| 2019–2024 | Oita Trinita | 86 | (2) |
| 2025 | Shimizu S-Pulse | 6 | (0) |
| 2026– | FC Gifu | 18 | (1) |
- * Club domestic league appearances and goals as of 17 August 2026

Kento Haneda (羽田 健人, Haneda Kento; born 7 July 1997) is a Japanese footballer who plays as a defender for FC Gifu.

== Career statistics ==
=== Club ===
As of 9 July 2021.

| Club | Season | League | | | National Cup | | League Cup | | Other | | Total | |
| Club | Season | Division | Apps | Goals | Apps | Goals | Apps | Goals | Apps | Goals | Apps | Goals |
|---|---|---|---|---|---|---|---|---|---|---|---|---|
| Oita Trinita | 2019 | J1 League | 1 | 0 | 0 | 0 | 0 | 0 | 0 | 0 | 1 | 0 |
| Oita Trinita | 2020 | J1 League | 20 | 0 | 0 | 0 | 2 (Note: Appearances in the J. League Cup) | 0 | 0 | 0 | 22 | 0 |
| Oita Trinita | 2021 | J1 League | 14 | 0 | 2 (Note: Appearances in the Emperor's Cup) | 0 | 4 | 0 | 0 | 0 | 20 | 0 |
| Career total | | | 35 | 0 | 2 | 0 | 6 | 0 | 0 | 0 | 43 | 0 |
