= Bueno (footballer) =

Brazilian footballer (born 1995)

Personal information
- Full name: Wellington Daniel Bueno
- Date of birth: 24 August 1995 (age 31)
- Place of birth: São Paulo, Brazil
- Height: 1.82 m (6 ft 0 in)
- Position: Centre-back

Youth career
- Luiz Antônio FC
- Olé Brasil
- Botafogo FC
- –2013: Chiba Kokusai High School

Senior career*
Years	Team	Apps	(Gls)
2014–2015	Shimizu S-Pulse	4	(0)
2015	→ Vissel Kobe (loan)	11	(1)
2016–2022	Kashima Antlers	35	(1)
2018	→ Tokushima Vortis (loan)	15	(1)
2020–2021	→ Atlético Mineiro (loan)	10	(0)
2023	Kashiwa Reysol	1	(0)
- * Club domestic league appearances and goals as of 19:33, 20 June 2023 (UTC)

Wellington Daniel Bueno (born 24 August 1995), commonly known as Bueno, is a Brazilian footballer who plays as centre-back and last played for Kashiwa Reysol.

== Career ==
In 2016, Bueno signed for J1 League club Kashima Antlers and played for them for 6 seasons before being released at the end of the 2022 season.

In April 2023, Bueno signed for Kashiwa Reysol. He made his debut for the club in the same month in a 1–1 draw with Kyoto Sanga. However, he made no further appearances for the club and was released at the end of the season.

== Club statistics ==
As of 29 April 2023.

Appearances and goals by club, season and competition
Club	Season	League			State League		Cup		League Cup		Other		Total	
Club	Season	Division	Apps	Goals	Apps	Goals	Apps	Goals	Apps	Goals	Apps	Goals	Apps	Goals
Shimizu S-Pulse	2014	J1 League	4	0	–		1	0	0	0	–		5	0
Vissel Kobe (loan)	2015	J1 League	11	1	–		2	0	2	0	–		15	1
Kashima Antlers	2016	J1 League	8	0	–		2	0	1	0	–		11	0
Kashima Antlers	2017	J1 League	2	0	–		3	0	1	0	–		6	0
Kashima Antlers	2019	J1 League	17	1	–		3	0	3	1	–		23	2
Kashima Antlers	2021	J1 League	1	0	–		0	0	0	0	–		1	0
Kashima Antlers	2022	J1 League	7	0	–		1	0	5	1	–		13	1
Kashima Antlers	Total		35	1	0	0	9	0	10	2	0	0	54	3
Tokushima Vortis (loan)	2018	J2 League	15	1	–		2	1	–		–		17	2
Atlético Mineiro (loan)	2020	Série A	9	0	0	0	–		–		–		9	0
Atlético Mineiro (loan)	2021	Série A	1	0	0	0	–		–		–		1	0
Atlético Mineiro (loan)	Total		10	0	0	0	0	0	0	0	0	0	10	0
Kashiwa Reysol	2023	J1 League	1	0	–		0	0	0	0	–		1	0
Career total			76	3	0	0	14	1	12	2	0	0	102	6

== Honours ==
Kashima Antlers

- J1 League: 2016
- Emperor's Cup: 2016
- Japanese Super Cup: 2017

Atlético Mineiro

- Campeonato Mineiro: 2020, 2021
