= Rikuto Hirose =

Japanese footballer

Rikuto Hirose 広瀬 陸斗
- Hirose with Kashima Antlers in 2026

Personal information
- Full name: Rikuto Hirose
- Date of birth: 23 September 1995 (age 31)
- Place of birth: Saitama, Japan
- Height: 1.76 m (5 ft 9 in)
- Position: Right back

Team information
- Current team: Kashima Antlers
- Number: 37

Youth career
- Tsuchiai SSS
- 2008–2013: Urawa Red Diamonds

Senior career*
| Years | Team | Apps | (Gls) |
| 2014 | Mito HollyHock | 30 | (0) |
| 2015–2018 | Tokushima Vortis | 98 | (4) |
| 2019 | Yokohama F. Marinos | 20 | (1) |
| 2020–2023 | Kashima Antlers | 71 | (0) |
| 2024–2026 | Vissel Kobe | 71 | (2) |
| 2026– | Kashima Antlers | 0 | (0) |
- * Club domestic league appearances and goals as of 21:01, 3 August 2026 (UTC)

Rikuto Hirose (広瀬 陸斗, Hirose Rikuto; born 23 September 1995) is a Japanese professional footballer who plays for J1 League club Kashima Antlers. He previously played for J2 League sides Mito Hollyhock and Tokushima Vortis.

His father Osamu is a former professional footballer.

== Club statistics ==
As of 3 August 2026.

Appearances and goals by club, season and competition
| Club | Season | League | | | National cup (Note: Includes Emperors Cup) | | League cup (Note: Includes J.League Cup) | | Continental | | Other | | Total | |
| Club | Season | Division | Apps | Goals | Apps | Goals | Apps | Goals | Apps | Goals | Apps | Goals | Apps | Goals |
|---|---|---|---|---|---|---|---|---|---|---|---|---|---|---|
| Mito HollyHock | 2014 | J.League Division 2 | 30 | 0 | 1 | 0 | – | | – | | – | | 31 | 0 |
| Tokushima Vortis | 2015 | J2 League | 31 | 1 | 4 | 1 | – | | – | | – | | 35 | 2 |
| Tokushima Vortis | 2016 | J2 League | 41 | 3 | 3 | 1 | – | | – | | – | | 44 | 4 |
| Tokushima Vortis | 2017 | J2 League | 13 | 0 | 0 | 0 | – | | – | | – | | 13 | 0 |
| Tokushima Vortis | 2018 | J2 League | 13 | 0 | 0 | 0 | – | | – | | – | | 13 | 0 |
| Tokushima Vortis | Total | | 98 | 4 | 7 | 2 | 0 | 0 | 0 | 0 | 0 | 0 | 105 | 6 |
| Yokohama F. Marinos | 2019 | J1 League | 20 | 1 | 1 | 0 | 1 | 0 | – | | – | | 22 | 1 |
| Kashima Antlers | 2020 | J1 League | 15 | 0 | 0 | 0 | 2 | 0 | 1 (Note: Appearances in AFC Champions League Elite) | 0 | – | | 18 | 0 |
| Kashima Antlers | 2021 | J1 League | 9 | 0 | 1 | 0 | 7 | 1 | 0 | 0 | – | | 17 | 1 |
| Kashima Antlers | 2022 | J1 League | 20 | 0 | 5 | 0 | 5 | 0 | 0 | 0 | – | | 30 | 0 |
| Kashima Antlers | 2023 | J1 League | 27 | 0 | 1 | 0 | 7 | 0 | 0 | 0 | – | | 35 | 0 |
| Kashima Antlers | Total | | 71 | 0 | 7 | 0 | 21 | 1 | 1 | 0 | 0 | 0 | 100 | 1 |
| Vissel Kobe | 2024 | J1 League | 27 | 2 | 4 | 0 | 1 | 0 | 4 | 0 | 1 (Note: Appearance in Japanese Super Cup) | 0 | 37 | 2 |
| Vissel Kobe | 2025 | J1 League | 28 | 0 | 5 | 1 | 0 | 0 | 6 | 0 | 0 | 0 | 39 | 1 |
| Vissel Kobe | 2026 | J1 (100) | 16 | 0 | 0 | 0 | 0 | 0 | 5 | 0 | 0 | 0 | 21 | 0 |
| Vissel Kobe | Total | | 71 | 2 | 9 | 1 | 1 | 0 | 15 | 0 | 1 | 0 | 97 | 3 |
| Kashima Antlers | 2026–27 | J1 League | 0 | 0 | 0 | 0 | 0 | 0 | 0 | 0 | 0 | 0 | 0 | 0 |
| Career total | | | 290 | 7 | 25 | 3 | 23 | 1 | 16 | 0 | 1 | 0 | 355 | 11 |

== Honours ==
=== Club ===
Yokohama F. Marinos

- J1 League: 2019

Vissel Kobe

- J1 League: 2024
- Emperor's Cup: 2024
- J1 100 Year Vision League: 2026
