= Riku Matsuda (footballer, born 1991) =

Japanese footballer

Riku Matsuda 松田 陸
Personal information
- Full name: Riku Matsuda
- Date of birth: 24 July 1991 (age 35)
- Place of birth: Osaka, Japan
- Height: 1.71 m (5 ft 7 in)
- Position: Right-back

Team information
- Current team: Phnom Penh Crown
- Number: 2

Youth career
- 2007–2009: Rissho University Shonan High School

College career
Years	Team	Apps	(Gls)
2010–2013	Biwako Seikei Sport College		

Senior career*
Years	Team	Apps	(Gls)
2014–2015	FC Tokyo	16	(1)
2016–2023	Cerezo Osaka	258	(7)
2023	→ Ventforet Kofu (loan)	12	(0)
2024	Gamba Osaka	13	(0)
2025–2026	Vissel Kobe	2	(0)
2026	BG Pathum United	11	(0)
2026–	Phnom Penh Crown		

International career
2017	Japan U18	1	(0)
Medal record
Cerezo Osaka
Winner	J.League Cup	2017
Winner	Emperor's Cup	2017
- * Club domestic league appearances and goals as of 25 August 2026 (UTC)

Riku Matsuda (松田 陸, Matsuda Riku; born July 24, 1991) is a Japanese professional footballer who plays as a right-back for Phnom Penh Crown.

== Career ==
During his time in high school, he was converted from forward to a defending role.

After four years attending the Biwako Seikei Sport College and becoming the side-captain, Matsuda signed for FC Tokyo in 2014. In 2013, he was registered from the club as Special Designated Player.

He decided to leave FC Tokyo after the 2015 season. In January 2016, Matsuda signed with his hometown-club, Cerezo Osaka.

On 16 August 2023, Matsuda signs on loan with J2 League club, Ventforet Kofu of Yamanashi, until the end of 2023 season.

On 11 January 2024, Matsuda signed to J1 club, Gamba Osaka for 2024 season.

On 5 February 2025, Matsuda signed to J1 club 2024 champions, Vissel Kobe for 2025 season.

On 10 August 2026, Matsuda signed for Phnom Penh Crown.

== Personal life ==
Matsuda was born to Indonesian father and Japanese mother. His twin brother, Riki, is also a soccer player who currently plays for Kataller Toyama in J2 League.

== Career statistics ==
=== Club ===
As of the start for 2025 season.

Club performance			League		Cup		League Cup		Continental		Other^{1}		Total	
Season	Club	League	Apps	Goals	Apps	Goals	Apps	Goals	Apps	Goals	Apps	Goals	Apps	Goals
Japan			League		Emperor's Cup		J. League Cup		AFC		Other		Total	
2014	FC Tokyo	J.League Div 1	7	1	2	0	5	0	–		–		14	1
2015	FC Tokyo	J1 League	9	0	0	0	2	0	–		–		11	0
2016	Cerezo Osaka	J2 League	42	2	2	0	–		–		–		44	2
2017	Cerezo Osaka	J1 League	31	2	2	0	3	0	–		–		36	2
2018	Cerezo Osaka	J1 League	29	0	1	0	2	0	4	0	1	0	37	0
2019	Cerezo Osaka	J1 League	33	1	0	0	6	0	–		–		39	1
2020	Cerezo Osaka	J1 League	31	1	–		2	0	–		–		33	1
2021	Cerezo Osaka	J1 League	34	1	4	0	4	0	5	0	–		47	1
2022	Cerezo Osaka	J1 League	33	0	1	0	10	0	–		–		44	0
2023	Cerezo Osaka	J1 League	9	0	2	0	5	0	–				16	0
2023	Ventforet Kofu (loan)	J2 League	12	0	0	0	–						12	0
2024	Gamba Osaka	J1 League	13	0	1	0	–						14	0
2025	Vissel Kobe	J1 League	2	0	0	0	0	0	1	0	0	0	3	0
Career total			285	8	15	0	39	0	10	0	1	0	350	8

^{1}includes Japanese Super Cup appearances

== Honours ==
=== Club ===
Kansai University selection

- Denso Cup Soccer: 2012

Cerezo Osaka

- Emperor's Cup: 2017
- J.League Cup: 2017
- Japanese Super Cup: 2018

=== Individual ===
- Kansai Student Soccer League: 2012, 2013
- Denso Cup Challenge Soccer Best Eleven: 2012
