= Yuya Oki =

Japanese footballer

Yuya Oki 沖 悠哉
Personal information
- Full name: Yuya Oki
- Date of birth: 22 August 1999 (age 27)
- Place of birth: Ibaraki, Japan
- Height: 1.85 m (6 ft 1 in)
- Position: Goalkeeper

Team information
- Current team: Shimizu S-Pulse
- Number: 1

Youth career
- –2017: Kashima Antlers

Senior career*
Years	Team	Apps	(Gls)
2018–2023	Kashima Antlers	59	(0)
2024–	Shimizu S-Pulse	33	(0)
- * Club domestic league appearances and goals as of 10 August 2026

Yuya Oki (沖 悠哉, Oki Yuya; born 22 August 1999) is a Japanese professional footballer who plays as a goalkeeper for J1 League club Shimizu S-Pulse.

== Career ==
An Ibaraki native, Oki started his career with Kashima Antlers Junior. He made his way up through all of their youth ranks before making his professional debut in August 2020 for the Kashima first-team against Sagan Tosu in the J1 League. He kept a clean sheet as Kashima won 2–0. He made 24 league appearances in his debut season.

He became first-choice goalkeeper in the 2021 season, making 38 appearances across all competitions, however he fell out of favour in 2022 and only played two more league games for the club up to the end of the 2023 season.

In December 2023, it was announced that Oki would be moving on a permanent transfer to J2 League club Shimizu S-Pulse.

== Career statistics ==
=== Club ===
As of end of 2024 season.

Appearances and goals by club, season and competition
Club	Season	League			National Cup		League Cup		Total	
Club	Season	Division	Apps	Goals	Apps	Goals	Apps	Goals	Apps	Goals
Japan			League		Emperor's Cup		J.League Cup		Total	
Kashima Antlers	2020	J1 League	24	0	0	0	0	0	24	0
Kashima Antlers	2021	J1 League	33	0	2	0	3	0	38	0
Kashima Antlers	2022	J1 League	2	0	3	0	5	0	10	0
Kashima Antlers	2023	J1 League	0	0	2	0	6	0	8	0
Kashima Antlers	Total		59	0	7	0	14	0	80	0
Shimizu S-Pulse	2024	J2 League	2	0	2	0	1	0	5	0
Career total			61	0	9	0	15	0	85	0
