= Ryōhei Shirasaki =

Japanese footballer

Ryōhei Shirasaki 白崎 凌兵
Personal information
- Date of birth: 18 May 1993 (age 33)
- Place of birth: Chōfu, Tokyo, Japan
- Height: 1.81 m (5 ft 11 in)
- Positions: Attacking midfielder; winger

Team information
- Current team: FC Machida Zelvia
- Number: 23

Youth career
- 2000: Tokyo BIG SC
- 2001–2015: Yokogawa Musashino
- 2006–2008: FC Tokyo Musashi
- 2009–2011: Yamanashi Gakuin High School

Senior career*
Years	Team	Apps	(Gls)
2012–2018	Shimizu S-Pulse	114	(15)
2013–2014	→ Kataller Toyama (loan)	50	(5)
2014–2015	→ J. League U-22 (loan)	0	(0)
2019–2021	Kashima Antlers	51	(9)
2021	→ Sagan Tosu (loan)	12	(1)
2022–2024	Shimizu S-Pulse	76	(6)
2024	→ FC Machida Zelvia (loan)	14	(1)
2025–	FC Machida Zelvia	35	(0)
Medal record
Shimizu S-Pulse
Runner-up	J.League Cup	2012
- * Club domestic league appearances and goals as of 9 August 2026

Ryōhei Shirasaki (白崎 凌兵, Shirasaki Ryōhei; born 18 May 1993) is a Japanese football player for FC Machida Zelvia.

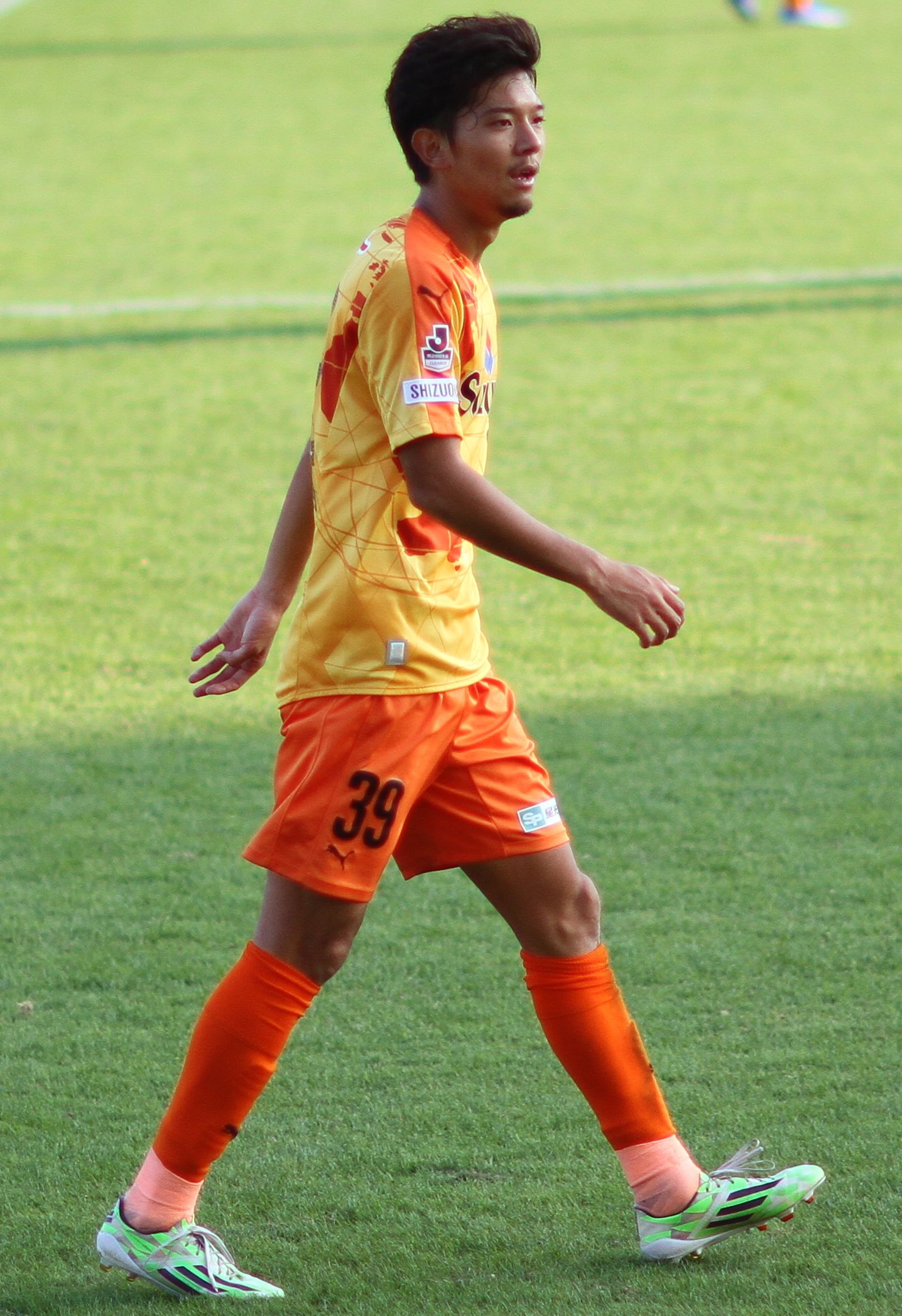
Shirasaki in 2015

Shirasaki has made over 300 league appearances, with more than 180 of them in the J1 League. Described in the 2017 season as a "key player" for Shimizu S-Pulse, he has spent most of his career with the club.

== Career ==
On 30 August 2011, Shimizu S-Pulse announced that Shirasaki would be promoted to the first team from the 2012 season.

On 9 August 2013, Shirasaki was announced at Kataller Toyama on a six month loan. On 8 January 2014, his loan was extended on a one year loan for the 2014 season. It was reported that Shirasaki would only stay at Kataller Toyama if manager Takayoshi Amma stayed. He changed his shirt number to 9 for the 2014 season. On 17 January 2015, his loan expired and he returned to Shimizu S-Pulse. He played regular football with Kataller Toyama and improved offensively and defensively.

During the 2017 season, Shirasaki was described as a "key player" during their first season back in the J1 League.

On 29 December 2018, Shirasaki was announced at Kashima Antlers on a permanent transfer. On 18 May 2019, his 26th birthday, he scored two goals against Matsumoto Yamaga. On 20 July 2019, he scored against Sagan Tosu, meaning he had scored in two consecutive gameweeks.

On 11 August 2021, Shirasaki was announced at Sagan Tosu on a six month loan deal.

On 27 December 2021, Shirasaki was announced at Shimizu S-Pulse on a permanent transfer.

On 31 July 2024, Shirasaki was announced at Machida Zelvia on a six month loan deal.

On 4 January 2025, Shirasaki was announced at Machida Zelvia on a permanent transfer.

== International career ==
In November 2013, Shirasaki was called up to the Japan U20 team for their tour of Myanmar.

== Career statistics ==
=== Club ===
As of 24 July 2022

Club performance			League		Cup		League Cup		Continental		Total	
Season	Club	League	Apps	Goals	Apps	Goals	Apps	Goals	Apps	Goals	Apps	Goals
Japan			League		Emperor's Cup		J. League Cup		Asia		Total	
2012	Shimizu S-Pulse	J1 League	7	0	2	4	7	1	–		16	5
2013	Shimizu S-Pulse	J1 League	1	0	0	0	0	0	–		1	0
2013	Kataller Toyama	J2 League	13	4	1	2	–		–		14	6
2014	Kataller Toyama	J2 League	37	1	2	0	–		–		39	1
2015	Shimizu S-Pulse	J1 League	20	2	0	0	2	1	–		22	3
2016	Shimizu S-Pulse	J2 League	35	8	1	0	–		–		36	8
2017	Shimizu S-Pulse	J1 League	24	3	0	0	2	0	–		26	3
2018	Shimizu S-Pulse	J1 League	27	2	2	0	4	0	–		33	2
2019	Kashima Antlers	J1 League	25	5	4	0	4	1	5	0	38	6
2020	Kashima Antlers	J1 League	9	2	–		2	1	1	0	12	3
2021	Kashima Antlers	J1 League	17	2	1	0	5	2	–		23	4
2021	Sagan Tosu	J1 League	12	1	0	0	0	0	–		12	1
2022	Shimizu S-Pulse	J1 League	19	1	1	0	3	0	–		23	1
Total			246	31	14	6	29	6	6	0	295	43

== Honours ==
=== Club ===
Machida Zelvia

- Emperor's Cup: 2025
