= Kei Koizumi =

Japanese footballer

Kei Koizumi 小泉 慶
Personal information
- Full name: Kei Koizumi
- Date of birth: 19 April 1995 (age 31)
- Place of birth: Adachi, Tokyo, Japan
- Height: 1.73 m (5 ft 8 in)
- Positions: Defensive midfielder; right back

Team information
- Current team: Shimizu S-Pulse
- Number: 37

Youth career
- Kashiwa Russell FC
- 2002–2010: Yokohama F. Marinos
- 2011–2013: RKU Kashiwa High School

Senior career*
Years	Team	Apps	(Gls)
2014–2017	Albirex Niigata	110	(4)
2015	→ J.League U-22 (loan)	1	(0)
2018–2019	Kashiwa Reysol	28	(1)
2019–2021	Kashima Antlers	46	(1)
2021–2022	Sagan Tosu	41	(1)
2023–2026	Tokyo	107	(3)
2026–	Shimizu S-Pulse	1	(0)
- * Club domestic league appearances and goals as of 10 August 2026

Kei Koizumi (小泉 慶, Koizumi Kei; born 19 April 1995) is a Japanese footballer who plays as a defensive midfielder or right back for J1 League club Shimizu S-Pulse.

== Career ==
Koizumi started his career as a junior player with Yokohama F. Marinos, but the club did not promote him to their Under-18 team. He entered Ryutsu Keizai University Kashiwa High School and started playing for the school. He subsequently became a regular in the school team that won the Prince Takamado Cup in 2013.

In 2014, Koizumi joined J. League Division 1 club Albirex Niigata and has added some versatility to the Albirex squad. His ability to play in a number of positions across defence and midfield made him an attractive proposition and boss Masaaki Yanagishita was delighted to be able to prise him away from The Big Swan Stadium.

== Club statistics ==
As of 21 February 2023.

Club performance			League		Cup		League Cup		Continental		Total	
Season	Club	League	Apps	Goals	Apps	Goals	Apps	Goals	Apps	Goals	Apps	Goals
Japan			League		Emperor's Cup		J. League Cup		Asia		Total	
2014	Albirex Niigata	J1	26	0	2	0	6	1	-		34	1
2015	Albirex Niigata	J1	21	2	0	0	5	0	-		26	2
2016	Albirex Niigata	J1	30	0	1	0	4	0	-		35	0
2017	Albirex Niigata	J1	33	2	1	0	0	0	-		34	2
Total			110	4	4	0	15	1	-		119	5
2015	J.League U-22 (loan)	J3	1	0	0	0	-		-		1	0
Total			1	0	0	0	0	0	0	0	1	0
2018	Kashiwa Reysol	J1	27	1	2	1	4	0	5	1	38	3
2019	Kashiwa Reysol	J2	1	0	0	0	4	0	-		5	0
Total			28	1	2	1	8	0	5	1	43	3
2019	Kashima Antlers	J1	7	0	2	0	3	0	2	0	14	0
2020	Kashima Antlers	J1	22	1	0	0	2	0	0	0	24	1
2021	Kashima Antlers	J1	17	0	1	0	5	0	0	0	23	0
Total			46	1	3	0	10	0	2	0	61	1
2021	Sagan Tosu	J1	11	0	0	0	0	0	-		11	0
2022	Sagan Tosu	J1	30	1	2	0	2	0	-		34	1
Total			41	1	2	0	2	0	0	0	46	1
2023	FC Tokyo	J1	1	0	0	0	0	0	0	0	1	0
Total			1	0	0	0	0	0	0	0	1	0
Career Total			227	7	11	1	35	1	7	1	280	10
