= 2022 Kawasaki Frontale season =

Kawasaki Frontale
2022 season
- Chairman: Akihiro Yoshida (from April 2022)
- Manager: Toru Oniki
- Stadium: Kawasaki Todoroki Stadium
- J1 League: Runners-up
- Emperor's Cup: Third round
- J. League Cup: Quarter-finals
- AFC Champions League: Group stage
- Japanese Super Cup: Runners-up
- Top goalscorer: League: Marcinho (12 goals); All: Marcinho (15 goals)
Home colours	Away colours

The 2022 season was Kawasaki Frontale's 18th consecutive season in the J1 League. They competed in the AFC Champions League, Emperor's Cup, J.League Cup, and the Japanese Super Cup. No major trophies were won by Frontale, however, their season performance at the J1 qualified them to the 2023-24 AFC Champions League, in which they qualified straight into the group stage.

== Squad ==
As of 10 August 2022.

=== First-team squad ===
Note: Flags indicate national team as defined under FIFA eligibility rules; some limited exceptions apply. Players may hold more than one non-FIFA nationality.

No.	Pos.	Nation	Player
1	GK	KOR	Jung Sung-ryong
2	DF	JPN	Kyohei Noborizato (vice-captain)
4	DF	BRA	Jesiel
5	MF	JPN	Shogo Taniguchi (captain)
6	MF	BRA	João Schmidt
7	DF	JPN	Shintaro Kurumaya
8	MF	JPN	Kento Tachibanada
9	FW	BRA	Leandro Damião (vice-captain)
10	MF	JPN	Ryota Oshima
11	FW	JPN	Yu Kobayashi
13	DF	JPN	Miki Yamane
14	MF	JPN	Yasuto Wakizaka (vice-captain)
15	DF	JPN	Asahi Sasaki
16	MF	JPN	Tatsuki Seko
17	MF	JPN	Kazuki Kozuka
18	MF	THA	Chanathip Songkrasin

No.	Pos.	Nation	Player
19	FW	JPN	Daiya Tono
20	FW	JPN	Kei Chinen
21	GK	JPN	Shunsuke Ando
22	GK	JPN	Yuki Hayasaka
23	FW	BRA	Marcinho
24	FW	JPN	Ten Miyagi
25	MF	JPN	Renji Matsui
26	MF	JPN	Takatora Einaga
27	GK	JPN	Kenta Tanno
28	FW	JPN	Taiyo Igarashi
29	DF	JPN	Kota Takai
31	MF	JPN	Kazuya Yamamura
32	FW	JPN	Shin Yamada
33	MF	JPN	Yuto Ozeki
34	DF	JPN	Yuto Matsunagane
41	MF	JPN	Akihiro Ienaga

=== Out on loan ===
Note: Flags indicate national team as defined under FIFA eligibility rules; some limited exceptions apply. Players may hold more than one non-FIFA nationality.

No.	Pos.	Nation	Player
—	FW	JPN	Taisei Miyashiro (at Sagan Tosu until 31 January 2023)
—	MF	JPN	Koki Harada (at AC Nagano Parceiro until 31 January 2023)
—	MF	JPN	Kaito Kamiya (at Fujieda MYFC until 31 January 2023)

No.	Pos.	Nation	Player
—	DF	JPN	Zain Issaka (at Yokohama FC until 31 Jan 2023)
—	DF	JPN	Shuto Tanabe (at JEF United Chiba until 31 Jan 2023)

== Transfers ==
=== Transfers in ===
Date	Position	Player	From	Type	Source
1 Feb 2022	FW	(Japan) Takatora Einaga	(Japan) Kokoku High School	Full	-
1 Feb 2022	DF	(Japan) Asahi Sasaki	(Japan) Ryutsu Keizai University	Full	-
1 Feb 2022	MF	(Japan) Renji Matsui	(Japan) Hosei University	Full	-
1 Feb 2022	GK	(Japan) Yuki Hayasaka	(Japan) Toin University of Yokohama	Full	
1 Feb 2022	FW	(Japan) Taiyo Igarashi	(Japan) Kawasaki Frontale U-18	Full	
23 Dec 2021	MF	(Japan) Tatsuki Seko	(Japan) Yokohama FC	Full	
11 Jan 2022	MF	(Thailand) Chanathip Songkrasin	(Japan) Hokkaido Consadole Sapporo	Full	
4 Feb 2022	DF	(Japan) Kota Takai	(Japan) Kawasaki Frontale U-18	Full	
17 Jun 2022	FW	(Japan) Shin Yamada	(Japan) Toin University of Yokohama	DSP	
5 Aug 2022	MF	(Japan) Yuto Ozeki	(Japan) Kawasaki Frontale U-18	Full	
5 Aug 2022	DF	(Japan) Yuto Matsunagane	(Japan) Kawasaki Frontale U-18	Full	

=== Transfers out ===
Date	Position	Player	To	Type	Source
25 Dec 2021	GK	(South Korea) Kyung-tae Lee	(South Korea) Gimhae FC	Full / end of loan	
25 Dec 2021	DF	(Japan) Zain Issaka	(Japan) Yokohama FC	Loan (to 31 Jan 2023)	
31 Dec 2021	MF	(Japan) Reo Hatate	(Scotland) Celtic	Full	
31 Dec 2021	MF	(Japan) Tatsuya Hasegawa	(Japan) Yokohama FC	Full	
31 Dec 2021	FW	(Japan) Taisei Miyashiro	(Japan) Sagan Tosu	Loan (to 31 Jan 2023)	
7 Jan 2022	MF	(Japan) Koki Harada	(Japan) AC Nagano Parceiro	Loan (to 31 Jan 2023)	
12 Jan 2022	DF	(Japan) Kaito Kamiya	(Japan) Fujieda MYFC	Loan (to 31 Jan 2023)	
28 Apr 2022	MF	(Japan) Ao Tanaka	(Japan) Fortuna Düsseldorf	Full	
21 Jul 2022	DF	(Japan) Shuto Tanabe	(Japan) JEF United Chiba	Loan (to 31 Jan 2023)	
22 Jul 2022	MF	(Japan) Koki Tsukagawa	(Japan) FC Tokyo	Full	

== Competitions ==
=== Overview ===
Competition	First match	Last match	Starting round	Final position	Record							
Competition	First match	Last match	Starting round	Final position	Pld	W	D	L	GF	GA	GD	Win %
J1 League	18 February 2022	5 November 2022	Matchday 1	TBD	34	20	6	8	65	42	+23	58.82
AFC Champions League	15 April 2022	30 April 2022	Group Stage	Group Stage	6	3	1	2	17	4	+13	50.00
Emperor's Cup	1 June 2022	22 June 2022	2nd Round	3rd Round	2	1	0	1	5	1	+4	50.00
J.League Cup	3 August 2022	10 August 2022	Prime Stage	Quarter-finals	2	0	2	0	3	3	+0	0.00
Japanese Super Cup	12 February 2022		Final	Runners-up	1	0	0	1	0	2	−2	0.00
Total					45	24	9	12	90	52	+38	53.33

Source: Competitions

=== J1 League ===
==== Table ====
Pos	Team	Pld	W	D	L	GF	GA	GD	Pts	Qualification or relegation
1	Yokohama F. Marinos (C)	34	20	8	6	70	35	+35	68	Qualification for the AFC Champions League group stage
2	Kawasaki Frontale	34	20	6	8	65	42	+23	66	Qualification for the AFC Champions League group stage
3	Sanfrecce Hiroshima	34	15	10	9	52	41	+11	55	
4	Kashima Antlers	34	13	13	8	47	42	+5	52	
5	Cerezo Osaka	34	13	12	9	46	40	+6	51	

Source: J.League Data Site
Rules for classification: 1) Points; 2) Goal difference; 3) Goals scored; 4) Head-to-head points; 5) Head-to-head goal difference; 6) Head-to-head goals scored; 7) Fewer disciplinary points.
(C) Champions

==== Results summary ====
Overall								Home						Away					
Pld	W	D	L	GF	GA	GD	Pts	W	D	L	GF	GA	GD	W	D	L	GF	GA	GD
34	20	6	8	64	42	+22	66	14	1	2	37	18	+19	6	5	6	27	24	+3

Source: see below

==== Results by matchday ====
Round	1	2	3	4	5	6	7	8	9	10	11	12	13	14	15	16	17	18	19	20	21	22	23	24	25	26	27	28	29	30	31	32	33	34
Ground	H	A	A	H	A	H	A	H	A	H	A	A	H	A	H	A	H	H	A	H	H	A	A	H	H	A	H	A	A	A	A	H	H	A
Result	W	W	D	W	W	L	D	W	L	W	W	W	W	D	L	L	W	D	L	W	W	D	L	W	W	W	W	L	W	D	L	W	W	W
Position	4	2	2	1	1	1	2	2	2	2	2	2	1	1	2	3	3	3	3	3	3	3	5	4	6	4	3	3	2	2	2	2	2	2

Source: See Below
A = Away; H = Home; W = Win; D = Draw; L = Loss

==== Matches ====
18 February 2022 1	Kawasaki Frontale	1–0	FC Tokyo	Kawasaki, Kanagawa
19:00 JST	Kurumaya (yellow card) 53'; Chanathip (yellow card) 58'; Leandro Damião 81'	Report	Henrique Trevisan (yellow card) 3'; Matsuki (yellow card) 50'; Leandro (yellow card) 84'	Stadium: Kawasaki Todoroki Stadium; Attendance: 17,544; Referee: Hiroyuki Kimura

23 February 2022 9	Yokohama F. Marinos	4–2	Kawasaki Frontale	Yokohama, Kanagawa
14:00 JST	Eduardo (yellow card) 39'; Élber 57', 64'; Nakagawa 58', 78'; Marcos Júnior (yellow card) 60'	Report	Chanathip (yellow card) 3'; Noborizato (yellow card) 20'; Ienaga 32'; Chinen 73' (yellow card) 83'	Stadium: Nissan Stadium; Attendance: 20433; Referee: Yusuke Araki

26 February 2022 2	Kashima Antlers	0–2	Kawasaki Frontale	Kashima, Ibaraki
15:00 JST		Report	Chinen 2'; Sasaki 17'	Stadium: Kashima Soccer Stadium; Attendance: 27,234; Referee: Koichiro Fukushima

2 March 2022 10	Kawasaki Frontale	2–1	Urawa Reds	Kawasaki, Kanagawa
19:00 JST	Tsukagawa (yellow card) 32'; Taniguchi (yellow card) 45'; Ienaga 62'; Chanathip (yellow card) 63'; Yamane 64'; Kobayashi (yellow card) 81'	Report	Iwanami 33' (yellow card) 68'	Stadium: Kawasaki Todoroki Stadium; Attendance: 14,696; Referee: Ryuji Sato

6 March 2022 3	Gamba Osaka	2–2	Kawasaki Frontale	Suita, Osaka
15:00 JST	Yamamoto 34'; Kurokawa (yellow card) 54'; Onose 77'	Report	Miyagi 75'; Taniguchi (yellow card) 90'; Leandro Damião 90+5'	Stadium: Panasonic Stadium Suita; Attendance: 12,703; Referee: Yudai Yamamoto

12 March 2022 4	Kawasaki Frontale	1–0	Nagoya Grampus	Kawasaki, Kanagawa
17:00 JST	Chanathip (yellow card) 15'; Marcinho 25'	Report	Morishita (yellow card) 75'	Stadium: Kawasaki Todoroki Stadium; Attendance: 18,114; Referee: Jumpei Iida

19 March 2022 5	Sanfrecce Hiroshima	0–2	Kawasaki Frontale	Hiroshima, Hiroshima
15:00 JST		Report	Yamamura (yellow card) 68'; Nogami 73' (o.g.); Yamane 88'	Stadium: Edion Stadium Hiroshima; Attendance: 7,544; Referee: Takuto Okabe

2 April 2022 6	Kawasaki Frontale	1–4	Cerezo Osaka	Kawasaki, Kanagawa
15:00 JST	Marcinho 86'	Report	Inui 13', 28'; Yamada 36', 68'	Stadium: Kawasaki Todoroki Stadium; Attendance: 18,090; Referee: Futoshi Nakamura

6 April 2022 7	Júbilo Iwata	1–1	Kawasaki Frontale	Iwata, Shizuoka
19:00 JST	Ito (yellow card) 37'; Germain (yellow card) 76'; Omori 78'	Report	Chinen 90+4'	Stadium: Yamaha Stadium; Attendance: 7,508; Referee: Masuya Ueda

9 April 2022 8	Kawasaki Frontale	1–0	Kashiwa Reysol	Kawasaki, Kanagawa
19:00 JST	João Schmidt (yellow card) 17'; Leandro Damião 45+2'; Ienaga (yellow card) 49'; Yamane (yellow card) 52'; Tono (yellow card) 53'; Sasaki (yellow card) 83'	Report	Mitsumaru (yellow card) 36'; Unoki (yellow card) 90+5'	Stadium: Kawasaki Todoroki Stadium; Attendance: 17,471; Referee: Akihiko Ikeuchi

7 May 2022 12	Shimizu S-Pulse	0–2	Kawasaki Frontale	Shimizu, Shizuoka
14:00 JST		Report	Wakizaka 14'; Marcinho 32'; Yamane (yellow card) 55'	Stadium: IAI Stadium Nihondaira; Attendance: 13,888; Referee: Koei Koya

14 May 2022 13	Kawasaki Frontale	2–0	Avispa Fukuoka	Kawasaki, Kanagawa
16:00 JST	Tono 55'; Kurumaya 59'	Report		Stadium: Kawasaki Todoroki Stadium; Attendance: 16,704; Referee: Koichiro Fukushima

18 May 2022 11	Vissel Kobe	0–1	Kawasaki Frontale	Kobe, Hyogo
19:00 JST		Report	Taniguchi 90+2'	Stadium: Noevir Stadium; Attendance: 10,015; Referee: Ryuji Sato

21 May 2022 14	Sagan Tosu	0–0	Kawasaki Frontale	Tosu, Saga
17:00 JST	Koizumi (yellow card) 19'; Tashiro (yellow card) 90'	Report	Taniguchi (red card) 79'	Stadium: Ekimae Real Estate Stadium; Attendance: 9,502; Referee: Yusuke Araki

25 May 2022 15	Kawasaki Frontale	0–4	Shonan Bellmare	Kawasaki, Kanagawa
19:00 JST	Chinen (yellow card) 90'; Yamane (yellow card) 90+4'	Report	Machino 50', 60'; Ikeda 54'; Elyounoussi 61'; Segawa (yellow card) 65'; Yamada (yellow card) 66'; Oiwa (yellow card) 76'	Stadium: Kawasaki Todoroki Stadium; Attendance: 14,068; Referee: Akihiko Ikeuchi

29 May 2022 16	Kyoto Sanga	1–0	Kawasaki Frontale	Kameoka, Kyoto
13:05 or 14:00 JST	Sasaki 60' (o.g.); Tawiah (yellow card) 69'; Takeda (yellow card) 80'; Ogiwara (yellow card) 87'	Report	Chinen (yellow card) 90+5'	Stadium: Sanga Stadium by Kyocera; Attendance: 17,417; Referee: Ryo Tanimoto

18 June 2022 17	Kawasaki Frontale	5–2	Hokkaido Consadole Sapporo	Kawasaki, Kanagawa
19:00 JST	Ienaga 42', 89'; Kobayashi 69', 86'; Marcinho 90+6'	Report	Aoki 28'; Suga (yellow card) 39'; Kaneko (yellow card) 60'; Fukai (yellow card) 61'; Arano 66' (yellow card) 69'	Stadium: Kawasaki Todoroki Stadium; Attendance: 18,960; Referee: Hiroki Kasahara

25 June 2022 18	Kawasaki Frontale	1–1	Júbilo Iwata	Kawasaki, Kanagawa
19:00 JST	Yamane 33'; Kurumaya (yellow card) 66'; Ienaga (yellow card) 90+4'	Report	Kanuma (yellow card) 25'; Graça (yellow card) 60'; Ito 85'	Stadium: Kawasaki Todoroki Stadium; Attendance: 19,024; Referee: Hajime Matsuo

2 July 2022 19	Cerezo Osaka	2–1	Kawasaki Frontale	Higashisumiyoshi-ku, Osaka
19:00 JST	Funaki 59' (yellow card) 61'; Jean Patric 90+2'	Report	Taniguchi 36'; Sasaki (yellow card) 90+1'	Stadium: Yodoko Sakura Stadium; Attendance: 12,987; Referee: Yusuke Araki

9 July 2022 21	Kawasaki Frontale	4–0	Gamba Osaka	Kawasaki, Kanagawa
19:00 JST	Leandro Damião 6'; Marcinho 20'; Wakizaka 30'; Ienaga 36' (yellow card) 70'	Report	Okuno (red card) 7'; Onose (yellow card) 53'; Kurata (yellow card) 67'; Dawhan (yellow card) 73'	Stadium: Kawasaki Todoroki Stadium; Attendance: 18,466; Referee: Jumpei Iida

30 July 2022 23	Urawa Reds	3–1	Kawasaki Frontale	Saitama, Saitama
19:00 JST	Ito 4'; Matsuo 17'; Shibato (yellow card) 81'; Iwao 85'; Koizumi (yellow card) 90'	Report	Taniguchi (yellow card) 51'; Ienaga 82'	Stadium: Saitama Stadium 2002; Attendance: 35,451; Referee: Hajime Matsuo

7 August 2022 24	Kawasaki Frontale	2–1	Yokohama F. Marinos	Kawasaki, Kanagawa
19:00 JST	Leandro Damião 25' (yellow card) 45'; Jesiel 90+9'	Report	Nakagawa 45+3'; R. Koike (yellow card) 90+3'	Stadium: Kawasaki Todoroki Stadium; Attendance: 20,704; Referee: Hiroyuki Kimura

20 August 2022 26	Avispa Fukuoka	1–4	Kawasaki Frontale	Fukuoka, Fukuoka
19:00 JST	Yamagishi 22' (yellow card) 46'; Grolli (red card) 70'	Report	Marcinho 7', 45', 64'; Ienaga 73' (pen.)	Stadium: Best Denki Stadium; Attendance: 9,651; Referee: Hayato Shimizu

27 August 2022 27	Kawasaki Frontale	2–1	Kashima Antlers	Kawasaki, Kanagawa
19:00 JST	Ienaga 8' (pen.); Wakizaka 14'; Schmidt (yellow card) 26'; Tachibanada (yellow card) 68'	Report	Pituca (yellow card) 7'; Higuchi (yellow card) 27'; Sekigawa (yellow card) 36'; Nakama 52'	Stadium: Kawasaki Todoroki Stadium; Attendance: 20,757; Referee: Ryuji Sato

31 August 2022 20	Kawasaki Frontale	4–0	Sagan Tosu	Kawasaki, Kanagawa
19:00 JST	Chinen 26'; João Schmidt 47'; Marcinho 56'; Oshima 87'	Report	Hwang Seok-ho (yellow card) 32'; Naganuma (yellow card) 79'	Stadium: Kawasaki Todoroki Stadium; Attendance: 13,923; Referee: Yudai Yamamoto

3 September 2022 28	Shonan Bellmare	2–1	Kawasaki Frontale	Hiratsuka, Kanagawa
19:00 JST	Machino 53' (pen.); Abe 90+3'	Report	Chinen 20'	Stadium: Lemon Gas Stadium; Attendance: 12,083; Referee: Jumpei Iida

10 September 2022 29	Kawasaki Frontale	4–0	Sanfrecce Hiroshima	Kawasaki, Kanagawa
18:30 JST	Jesiel (yellow card) 8'; Ienaga 34', 78'; Wakizaka 59'; Chinen 68' (pen.)	Report	Shibasaki (yellow card) 14'; Notsuda (yellow card) 54'	Stadium: Kawasaki Todoroki Stadium; Attendance: 20,873; Referee: Masuya Ueda

14 September 2022 22	Nagoya Grampus	1–1	Kawasaki Frontale	Toyota, Aichi
19:30 JST	Yamane (yellow card) 34'; Tachibanada (yellow card) 43' (goal) 61'; Schmidt (yellow card) 70'; Sasaki (yellow card) 90+4'	Report	Inagaki 74'; Nakatani (yellow card) 84'	Stadium: Toyota Stadium; Attendance: 10,690; Referee: Yusuke Araki

17 September 2022 30	Kashiwa Reysol	1–1	Kawasaki Frontale	Kashiwa, Chiba
19:03 JST	Douglas 63'	Report	Jesiel (yellow card) 3'; Kobayashi 38'; Marcinho (yellow card) 80'	Stadium: Sankyo Frontier Kashiwa Stadium; Attendance: 12,276; Referee: Takafumi Mikuriya

1 October 2022 31	Hokkaido Consadole Sapporo	4–3	Kawasaki Frontale	Sapporo, Hokkaido
16:00 JST	Lucas Fernandes 33'; Tanaka (yellow card) 35'; Koroki 41' (pen.); Gabriel Xavier 84'; Takamine (yellow card) 90+7'; Ogashiwa 90+12'	Report	Ienaga 30' (pen.); Wakizaka (yellow card) 58'; Chinen 60'; Kobayashi 69'; Tachibanada (red card) 84'	Stadium: Sapporo Atsubetsu Stadium; Attendance: 9,774; Referee: Takuto Okabe

8 October 2022 32	Kawasaki Frontale	3–2	Shimizu S-Pulse	Kawasaki, Kanagawa
TBD JST	Tono 28'; Schmidt (yellow card) 54'; Yamamura 76'; Kobayashi 78'	Report	Shirasaki 49'; Carlinhos Jr. 57'	Stadium: Kawasaki Todoroki Stadium; Attendance: 19,022; Referee: Hayato Shimizu

12 October 2022 25	Kawasaki Frontale	3–1	Kyoto Sanga	Kawasaki, Kanagawa
19:00 JST	Taniguchi 9'; Tachibanada 22'; Marcinho 60'	Report	Kawasaki (yellow card) 36'; Araki (yellow card) 54'; Paulinho 71'	Stadium: Kawasaki Todoroki Stadium; Attendance: 14,455; Referee: Futoshi Nakamura

29 October 2022 33	Kawasaki Frontale	2–1	Vissel Kobe	Kawasaki, Kanagawa
15:03 JST	Marcinho 20'; Schmidt (yellow card) 44'; Ienaga 84' (pen.)	Report	Kobayashi 51'; Sakai (yellow card) 90+1'	Stadium: Kawasaki Todoroki Stadium; Attendance: 22,110; Referee: Ryo Tanimoto

5 November 2022 34	FC Tokyo	2–3	Kawasaki Frontale	Chofu, Tokyo
TBD JST	Adaílton 47', 74'; Kimoto (yellow card) 85'	Report	Wakizaka 19'; Jung Sung-ryong (red card) 29'; Marcinho 61'; Watanabe 75' (o.g.)	Stadium: Ajinomoto Stadium; Attendance: 34,820; Referee: Yudai Yamamoto

=== AFC Champions League ===
==== Table ====
Pos	Team	Pld	W	D	L	GF	GA	GD	Pts	Qualification	JDT	KSF	ULS	GZH
1	(Malaysia) Johor Darul Ta'zim (H)	6	4	1	1	11	7	+4	13	Advance to Round of 16	—	0–5	2–1	5–0
2	(Japan) Kawasaki Frontale	6	3	2	1	17	4	+13	11		0–0	—	1–1	1–0
3	(South Korea) Ulsan Hyundai	6	3	1	2	14	7	+7	10		1–2	3–2	—	3–0
4	(China) Guangzhou	6	0	0	6	0	24	−24	0		0–2	0–8	0–5	—

Source: AFC
(H) Hosts

==== Matches ====
15 April 2022 1	Kawasaki Frontale (Japan)	1–1	(South Korea) Ulsan Hyundai FC	Johor Bahru, Malaysia
17:00 UTC+8	Kurumaya 90+4'	Report	Leonardo 21'	Stadium: Tan Sri Dato' Haji Hassan Yunos Stadium; Attendance: 114; Referee: Khamis Al-Marri (Qatar)

18 April 2022 2	Guangzhou FC (China)	0–8	(Japan) Kawasaki Frontale	Johor Bahru, Malaysia
17:00 UTC+8		Report	Chinen 7', 12'; Kurumaya 16', 71'; Kobayashi 21', 39'; Miyagi 50'; Chanathip 69'	Stadium: Tan Sri Dato' Haji Hassan Yunos Stadium; Referee: Payam Heydari (Iran)

21 April 2022 3	Kawasaki Frontale (Japan)	0–0	(Malaysia) Johor Darul Ta'zim	Iskandar Puteri, Malaysia
20:00 UTC+8		Report		Stadium: Sultan Ibrahim Stadium; Attendance: 17,592; Referee: Mohammed Al-Hoish (Saudi Arabia)

24 April 2022 4	Johor Darul Ta'zim (Malaysia)	0–5	(Japan) Kawasaki Frontale	Iskandar Puteri, Malaysia
20:00 UTC+8		Report	Wakizaka 14'; Kobayashi 31', 43'; Marcinho 81'; Chanathip 88'	Stadium: Sultan Ibrahim Stadium; Attendance: 16,679; Referee: Nawaf Shukralla (Bahrain)

27 April 2022 5	Ulsan Hyundai FC (South Korea)	3–2	(Japan) Kawasaki Frontale	Johor Bahru, Malaysia
17:00 UTC+8	Souza 14'; Um Won-sang 20'; Qazaishvili 47'	Report	Damião 40', 90+2'	Stadium: Tan Sri Dato' Haji Hassan Yunos Stadium; Referee: Mohammed Al-Hoish (Saudi Arabia)

30 April 2022 6	Kawasaki Frontale (Japan)	1–0	(China) Guangzhou FC	Johor Bahru, Malaysia
17:00 UTC+8	Chinen 14'	Report		Stadium: Tan Sri Dato' Haji Hassan Yunos Stadium; Attendance: 210; Referee: Muhammad Taqi (Singapore)

=== Emperor's Cup ===
==== Results ====
1 June 2022 Second round	Kawasaki Frontale	5–0	Sapporo University	Kawasaki, Kanagawa
18:00 JST	Kozuka 13'; Schmidt 16'; Chinen 20'; Seko 26'; Einaga 65'	Report		Stadium: Kawasaki Todoroki Stadium; Attendance: 4,667; Referee: Shu Kawamata

22 June 2022 Third round	Kawasaki Frontale	0–1	Tokyo Verdy	Kawasaki, Kanagawa
19:00 JST		Report	Sato 39'	Stadium: Kawasaki Todoroki Stadium; Attendance: 7,534; Referee: Kazuyoshi Enomoto

=== J.League Cup ===
==== Prime stage ====
3 August 2022 QF 1st leg	Cerezo Osaka	1–1	Kawasaki Frontale	Higashisumiyoshi-ku, Osaka
19:00	Taggart 89'	Report	Wakizaka 33'	Stadium: Yodoko Sakura Stadium; Attendance: 9,998; Referee: Yuichi Nishimura

10 August 2022 QF 2nd leg	Kawasaki Frontale	2–2	Cerezo Osaka	Kawasaki, Kanagawa
19:00	Marcinho 40', 53'	Report	Kato 90'; Yamada 90+5'	Stadium: Kawasaki Todoroki Stadium; Attendance: 13,877; Referee: Takuto Okabe
Note: 3–3 on aggregate. Cerezo Osaka won on away goals.

=== Japanese Super Cup ===
12 February 2022	Kawasaki Frontale	0–2	Urawa Reds	Yokohama, Kanagawa
13:35 JST		Report	Esaka 7', 81'	Stadium: Nissan Stadium; Attendance: 18,558; Referee: Hiroki Kasahara

=== Friendlies ===
20 July 2022 PSG Japan Tour	Paris Saint-Germain (France)	2–1	Kawasaki Frontale	Shinjuku, Tokyo
19:30 JST (UTC+9)	Messi 32'; Kalimuendo 58'		Yamamura 84'	Stadium: Japan National Stadium; Attendance: 64,922

12 November 2022 2022 J.League Asia Challenge	BG Pathum United (Thailand)	1–3	Kawasaki Frontale	Pathum Thani, Thailand
17:00 TST (UTC+7)	Conrado 63'	Report	Chinen 57'; Tachibanada 65'; Yamamura (red card) 70'; Marcinho 75'	Stadium: BG Stadium; Attendance: 10,089; Referee: Bunmeekiart Songkran (Thailand)

15 November 2022 2022 J.League Asia Challenge	Consadole Sapporo (Japan)	3–3	Kawasaki Frontale	Pathum Thani, Thailand
18:00 TST (UTC+7)	Nakamura 11'; Supachok 29'; Ogashiwa 51'	Report	Tachibanada 31'; Miyagi 36'; Marcinho 64'	Stadium: BG Stadium; Attendance: 7,547; Referee: Peshri Mongkolchai (Thailand)

20 November 2022 2022 Frontale Asia Tour	Becamex Binh Duong (Vietnam)	0–2	Kawasaki Frontale	Thủ Dầu Một, Vietnam
17:00 VST (UTC+7)		Report	Yamauchi 36'; Miyagi 83'	Stadium: Gò Đậu Stadium; Attendance: 10,000+ Referee: Ngô Duy Lân (Vietnam)

== Statistics ==
=== Appearances and goals ===
As of 5 November 2022

No.	Pos	Nat	Player	Total		J1 League		Emperor's Cup		J.League Cup		AFC Champions League		Super Cup	
No.	Pos	Nat	Player	Apps	Goals	Apps	Goals	Apps	Goals	Apps	Goals	Apps	Goals	Apps	Goals
Goalkeepers
1	GK	(South Korea) KOR	Jung Sung-ryong	41	0	31	0	1	0	2	0	6	0	1	0
27	GK	(Japan) JPN	Kenta Tanno	5	0	3+1	0	1	0	0	0	0	0	0	0
Defenders
2	DF	(Japan) JPN	Kyohei Noborizato	14	0	10+2	0	0	0	1	0	0	0	1	0
4	DF	(Brazil) BRA	Jesiel	14	1	11+1	1	0	0	1+1	0	0	0	0	0
5	DF	(Japan) JPN	Shogo Taniguchi	41	3	32+1	3	0	0	2	0	4+1	0	1	0
7	DF	(Japan) JPN	Shintaro Kurumaya	28	4	15+4	1	2	0	0+1	0	3+2	3	1	0
13	DF	(Japan) JPN	Miki Yamane	38	3	31+1	3	0	0	1	0	4	0	1	0
15	DF	(Japan) JPN	Asahi Sasaki	27	1	18+3	1	2	0	0	0	4	0	0	0
29	DF	(Japan) JPN	Kota Takai	1	0	0	0	0	0	0	0	0+1	0	0	0
Midfielders
6	MF	(Brazil) BRA	João Schmidt	30	2	15+7	1	2	1	2	0	2+1	0	1	0
8	MF	(Japan) JPN	Kento Tachibanada	40	2	31+1	2	0	0	2	0	4+2	0	0	0
10	MF	(Japan) JPN	Ryota Oshima	12	1	4+7	1	0	0	0	0	0	0	1	0
14	MF	(Japan) JPN	Yasuto Wakizaka	41	7	31+1	5	0	0	1+1	1	3+3	1	1	0
16	MF	(Japan) JPN	Tatsuki Seko	19	1	2+11	0	2	1	1	0	2	0	0+1	0
17	MF	(Japan) JPN	Kazuki Kozuka	17	1	2+10	0	2	1	0	0	2+1	0	0	0
18	MF	(Thailand) THA	Chanathip Songkrasin	21	2	15+1	0	0	0	1	0	3	2	1	0
25	MF	(Japan) JPN	Renji Matsui	4	0	0	0	2	0	0	0	2	0	0	0
26	MF	(Japan) JPN	Takatora Einaga	1	1	0	0	0+1	1	0	0	0	0	0	0
31	MF	(Japan) JPN	Kazuya Yamamura	32	1	12+11	1	2	0	1+1	0	3+2	0	0	0
41	MF	(Japan) JPN	Akihiro Ienaga	42	12	31+3	12	0+1	0	1+1	0	3+1	0	1	0
Forwards
9	FW	(Brazil) BRA	Leandro Damião	30	7	17+6	5	1	0	1+1	0	3	2	1	0
11	FW	(Japan) JPN	Yu Kobayashi	38	9	12+18	5	0	0	0+1	0	3+3	4	0+1	0
19	FW	(Japan) JPN	Daiya Tono	39	2	14+17	2	1	0	1+1	0	4+1	0	0	0
20	FW	(Japan) JPN	Kei Chinen	35	11	10+17	7	1	1	0	0	3+3	3	0+1	0
23	FW	(Brazil) BRA	Marcinho	40	15	24+6	12	2	0	2	2	3+2	1	0+1	0
24	FW	(Japan) JPN	Ten Miyagi	28	2	3+17	1	1	0	1	0	3+3	1	0	0
28	FW	(Japan) JPN	Taiyo Igarashi	1	0	0	0	0	0	0	0	0+1	0	0	0
32	FW	(Japan) JPN	Shin Yamada	1	0	0	0	0	0	1	0	0	0	0	0
Players loaned or transferred out during the season
3	DF	(Japan) JPN	Koki Tsukagawa	13	0	0+9	0	0	0	0	0	2+1	0	0+1	0
30	DF	(Japan) JPN	Shuto Tanabe	2	0	0	0	0+1	0	0	0	0+1	0	0	0

=== Clean sheets ===
Rank	No.	Pos.	Player	J.League	AFC Champions League	Emperor's Cup	J.League Cup	Japanese Super Cup	Total
1	1	GK	(South Korea) Jung Sung-ryong	12	4	0	0	0	16
2	27	GK	(Japan) Kenta Tanno	0	0	1	0	0	1
Total				12	4	1	0	0	17

=== Anker Power Player of the Month ===
Month	No.	Pos.	Player
February	1	GK	(South Korea) Jung Sung-ryong
March	8	MF	(Japan) Kento Tachibanada
April	23	FW	(Brazil) Marcinho
May	7	DF	(Japan) Shintaro Kurumaya
June	9	FW	(Japan) Yu Kobayashi
July	41	MF	(Japan) Akihiro Ienaga
August	4	DF	(Brazil) Jesiel
September	41	MF	(Japan) Akihiro Ienaga
October/November	9	FW	(Japan) Yu Kobayashi
