= 2025 Kawasaki Frontale season =

Kawasaki Frontale
2025 season
- Owner: Fujitsu
- Chairman: Yoshihiro Warashina
- Stadium: Kawasaki Todoroki Stadium; Kawasaki, Kanagawa
- J1 League: 7th
- Emperor's Cup: Second round
- J.League Cup: Play-off round
- 2024–25 AFC Champions League Elite: Runners-up
- Top goalscorer: League: Erison (5); All: Erison (9)
- Average home league attendance: 22,050
Home colours	Away colours

The 2025 season was Kawasaki Frontale's 19th consecutive season in the J1 League. As well as the domestic league, they also participated in the Emperor's Cup, the J.League Cup and the AFC Champions League knock-out stage.

== Players ==
No.	Name	Nationality	Date of birth (age)	Previous club	Contract since	Contract end
Goalkeepers
21	Shunsuke Andō	(Japan)	10 August 1990 (age 35)	(Japan) Shonan Bellmare	2009	
33	Lee Geun-hyeong	(South Korea)	22 May 2006 (age 19)	(South Korea) Boin High School	2025	2027
98	Louis Yamaguchi	(Japan) (France)	28 May 1998 (age 27)	(Japan) FC Machida Zelvia	2024	2025
Defenders
4	Jesiel	(Brazil)	5 March 1994 (age 32)	(Brazil) Paraná	2019	
5	Asahi Sasaki	(Japan)	26 January 2000 (age 26)	(Japan) Ryutsu Keizai University	2022	
7	Shintaro Kurumaya	(Japan)	5 April 1992 (age 34)	(Japan) University of Tsukuba	2014	
13	Sota Miura	(Japan)	7 September 2000 (age 25)	(Japan) Ventforet Kofu	2024	
15	Shuto Tanabe	(Japan)	5 May 2002 (age 24)	(Japan) JEF United Chiba	2021	
22	Filip Uremović	(Croatia)	11 February 1997 (age 29)	(Croatia) Hajduk Split	2025	2028
27	Ryota Kamihashi	(Japan)	16 June 2002 (age 23)	(Japan) Waseda University	2025	
30	Hiroto Noda	(Japan)	5 April 2006 (age 20)	(Japan) Shizuoka Gakuen School	2025	
31	Sai van Wermeskerken	(Japan) (Netherlands)	28 June 1994 (age 31)	(Netherlands) NEC Nijmegen	2024	
35	Yuichi Maruyama	(Japan)	16 June 1989 (age 36)	(Japan) Nagoya Grampus	2024	
39	Kaito Tsuchiya	(Japan)	12 May 2006 (age 19)	Youth Team	2022	2028
Midfielders
6	Yuki Yamamoto	(Japan)	6 November 1997 (age 28)	(Japan) Gamba Osaka	2024	
8	Kento Tachibanada	(Japan)	29 May 1998 (age 27)	(Japan) Toin University of Yokohama	2020	2027
10	Ryota Oshima	(Japan)	23 January 1993 (age 33)	(Japan) J.League U-22 Selection	2011	
14	Yasuto Wakizaka	(Japan)	11 June 1995 (age 30)	(Japan) Hannan University	2018	
16	Yuto Ozeki	(Japan)	6 February 2005 (age 21)	(Japan) Fukushima United		
19	So Kawahara	(Japan)	13 March 1998 (age 28)	(Japan) Sagan Tosu	2024	
29	Toya Myogan	(Japan)	29 June 2004 (age 21)	(Japan) Vegalta Sendai		
41	Akihiro Ienaga	(Japan)	13 June 1986 (age 39)	(Japan) Omiya Ardija	2017	
Forwards
9	Erison	(Brazil)	13 April 1999 (age 27)	(Brazil) São Paulo	2024	2027
11	Yu Kobayashi	(Japan)	23 September 1987 (age 38)	(Japan) Mito HollyHock	2008	
17	Tatsuya Ito	(Japan)	26 June 1997 (age 28)	(Germany) 1. FC Magdeburg	2025	
23	Marcinho	(Brazil)	16 May 1995 (age 30)	(China) Chongqing Lifan	2021	
24	Ten Miyagi	(Japan)	2 June 2001 (age 24)	(Japan) Montedio Yamagata	2020	
36	Kyosuke Mochiyama	(Japan)	18 August 2003 (age 22)	(Japan) Chuo University	2025	
38	Soma Kanda	(Japan)	29 December 2005 (age 20)	(Japan) Shizuoka Gakuen School	2025	2027
91	Lazar Romanić	(Serbia)	25 March 1998 (age 28)	(Serbia) Vojvodina	2025	
Players who left on loan/mid-season
6	Zé Ricardo	(Brazil)	3 February 1999 (age 27)	(Brazil) Goiás	2024	
22	Yuki Hayasaka	(Japan)	22 May 1999 (age 26)	(Japan) Toin University of Yokohama	2022	
26	Hinata Yamauchi	(Japan)	30 May 2001 (age 24)	(Japan) Toin University of Yokohama	2024	2028
28	Patrick Verhon	(Brazil)	8 September 2004 (age 21)	(Brazil) Bahia	2024	
34	Kota Yui	(Japan)	10 June 2005 (age 20)	Youth Team	2024	2027
44	César Haydar	(Colombia)	31 March 2001 (age 25)	(Brazil) Red Bull Bragantino	2024	2024
	Takuma Ominami	(Japan)	13 December 1997 (age 28)	(Japan) Kashiwa Reysol		
	Takatora Einaga	(Japan)	7 April 2003 (age 23)	(Japan) Tegevajaro Miyazaki		
	Taiyo Igarashi	(Japan)	14 April 2003 (age 23)	(Japan) Renofa Yamaguchi		
Players who left permanently in mid-season
1	Jung Sung-ryong	(South Korea)	4 January 1985 (age 41)	(South Korea) Suwon Samsung Bluewings	2016	
2	Kota Takai	(Japan)	4 September 2004 (age 21)	(Japan) River FC	2022	
18	Yusuke Segawa	(Japan)	7 February 1994 (age 32)	(Japan) Shonan Bellmare	2023	
20	Shin Yamada	(Japan)	30 May 2000 (age 25)	(Japan) Toin University of Yokohama	2022	
25	Shin Nakagawa	(Japan)	10 September 2001 (age 24)	(Japan) Fukushima United	2025	

== Friendly ==
=== Pre-season ===
Win Draw Loss

24 January 2025 1	Vanraure Hachinohe (Japan)	3–3	(Japan) Kawasaki Frontale	Okinawa, Japan
				Stadium: Akama Athletic Sports Park

31 January 2025 2	FC Machida Zelvia (Japan)	–	(Japan) Kawasaki Frontale	Okinawa, Japan
				Stadium: Akama Athletic Sports Park

== Transfers ==
=== Pre-season ===
==== In ====
Transfers in

Date	Position	Player	Transferred from	Ref
Permanent Transfer
15 December 2024	DF	(Japan) Yuto Matsunagane	(Japan) Fukushima United	Loan Return
15 December 2024	MF	(Japan) Yuto Ozeki	(Japan) Fukushima United	Loan Return
15 December 2024	MF	(Japan) Renji Matsui	(Japan) Vegalta Sendai	Loan Return
15 December 2024	MF	(Japan) Toya Myogan	(Japan) Vegalta Sendai	Loan Return (Note: Toya Myogan's loan extended for another season.)
15 December 2024	FW	(Japan) Taiyo Igarashi	(Japan) Renofa Yamaguchi	End of loan
21 December 2024	GK	(Japan) (France) Louis Yamaguchi	(Japan) FC Machida Zelvia	Undisclosed
10 January 2025	FW	(Japan) Tatsuya Ito	(Germany) 1. FC Magdeburg	Free
Loan Transfer
7 February 2025	GK	(Japan) Shin Nakagawa	(Japan) Fukushima United	Season loan

==== Out ====
Transfers out

Date	Position	Player	Transferred from	Ref
Permanent Transfer
15 December 2024	GK	(Japan) (France) Louis Yamaguchi	(Japan) FC Machida Zelvia	End of loan (Note: Louis Yamaguchi returns to the club on permanent basis after his contract with Machida Zelvia end.) (Note: Louis Yamaguchi move back to the team on permanent basis after his contract end.)
18 December 2024	DF	(Japan) Ryuta Koike	(Japan) Kashima Antlers	Undisclosed
20 December 2024	FW	(Japan) Daiya Tono	(Japan) Yokohama F. Marinos	Undisclosed
24 December 2024	MF	(Japan) Renji Matsui	(Japan) Vegalta Sendai	Undisclosed
Loan Transfer
20 August 2024	DF	(Japan) Takuma Ominami	(Belgium) OH Leuven	Season loan till May 2025
18 December 2024	GK	(Japan) Yuki Hayasaka	(Japan) Iwaki FC	Season loan
23 December 2024	MF	(Japan) Toya Myogan	(Japan) Vegalta Sendai	Season loan
25 December 2024	FW	(Japan) Takatora Einaga	(Japan) FC Ryukyu	Season loan
26 December 2024	FW	(Japan) Taiyo Igarashi	(Japan) Renofa Yamaguchi	Season loan
27 December 2024	DF	(Japan) Yuto Matsunagane	(Japan) Fukushima United	Season loan
27 December 2024	MF	(Japan) Kota Yui	(Japan) Fukushima United	Season loan
4 January 2025	MF	(Brazil) Zé Ricardo	(Japan) Shonan Bellmare	Season loan

=== Mid-season ===
==== In ====
Transfers in

Date	Position	Player	Transferred from	Ref
Permanent Transfer
2 August 2025	DF	(Croatia) Filip Uremović	(Croatia) Hajduk Split	Undisclosed
2 August 2025	FW	(Serbia) Lazar Romanić	(Serbia) Vojvodina	Undisclosed
Loan Transfer
20 August 2025	MF	(Japan) Toya Myogan	(Japan) Vegalta Sendai	Early loan termination

==== Out ====
Transfers out

Date	Position	Player	Transferred from	Ref
Permanent Transfer
7 June 2025	MF	(Japan) Yusuke Segawa	(Japan) Kashiwa Reysol	Undisclosed
17 June 2025	DF	(Japan) Takuma Ominami	(Belgium) OH Leuven	€600k
9 July 2025	DF	(Japan) Kota Takai	(England) Tottenham Hotspur	£5m
25 July 2025	DF	(Japan) Shin Yamada	(Scotland) Celtic	£1.3m
30 July 2025	GK	(Japan) Shin Nakagawa	(Japan) Fukushima United	End of loan
Loan Transfer
29 May 2025	FW	(Brazil) Patrick Verhon	(Japan) FC Imabari	Season loan
18 July 2025	DF	(Colombia) César Haydar	(Colombia) Atlético Nacional	Season loan
22 July 2025	MF	(Japan) Hinata Yamauchi	(Japan) Vegalta Sendai	Season loan

== Competitions ==
=== J1 League ===
Pos	Team	Pld	W	D	L	GF	GA	GD	Pts	Qualification or relegation
6	Machida Zelvia	38	17	9	12	52	38	+14	60	Qualification for the AFC Champions League Two group stage
7	Urawa Red Diamonds	38	16	11	11	45	39	+6	59	
8	Kawasaki Frontale	38	15	12	11	66	56	+10	57	
9	Gamba Osaka	38	17	6	15	53	55	−2	57	
10	Cerezo Osaka	38	14	10	14	60	57	+3	52	

Source: JLeague.co, JLeague.jp, J.League Data Site
Rules for classification: 1) Points; 2) Goal difference; 3) Goals scored; 4) Head-to-head points; 5) Head-to-head goal difference; 6) Head-to-head goals scored; 7) Fewer disciplinary points.

==== Matches ====
15 February 1	Kawasaki Frontale	4–0	Nagoya Grampus	Kawasaki
	Kota Takai 58'; Shin Yamada 67'; Hinata Yamauchi 78'; Ten Miyagi 87'; Marcinho (yellow card) 3'	Report	Sho Inagaki (yellow card) 45+2'; Kensuke Nagai (yellow card) 83'	Stadium: Kawasaki Todoroki Stadium; Attendance: 23,005; Referee: Koji Takasaki

22 February 2	Kashiwa Reysol	1–1	Kawasaki Frontale	Chiba
	Yoshio Koizumi 57'; Yuki Kakita (yellow card) 85'	Report	Yasuto Wakizaka 50'	Stadium: Sankyo Frontier Kashiwa Stadium; Attendance: 13,695; Referee: Koichiro Fukushima

26 February 3	Avispa Fukuoka	1–2	Kawasaki Frontale	Fukuoka
	Nassim Ben Khalifa 15'; Tomoya Ando (yellow card) 82'; Kazuki Fujimoto (yellow card) 90+5'	Report	Akihiro Ienaga 42'; Erison 85'; Kota Takai (yellow card) 23'; Kento Tachibanada (yellow card) 33'; Marcinho (yellow card) 78'	Stadium: Best Denki Stadium; Attendance: 7,106; Referee: Hiroyuki Kimura

1 March 4	Kawasaki Frontale	0–1	Kyoto Sanga	Kawasaki
	Masaya Okugawa 49'	Report	João Pedro (yellow card) 24'; Takuji Yonemoto (yellow card) 83'; Shimpei Fukuoka (yellow card) 90'	Stadium: Kawasaki Todoroki Stadium; Attendance: 22,404; Referee: Yudai Yamamoto

16 March 6	Fagiano Okayama	0–0	Kawasaki Frontale	Okayama
		Report	Erison (yellow card) 41'; Tatsuya Ito (yellow card) 43'	Stadium: City Light Stadium; Attendance: 13,699; Referee: Masuya Ueda

29 March 7	FC Tokyo	0–3	Kawasaki Frontale	Chōfu
		Report	Shin Yamada 55'; Tatsuya Ito 73'; Erison 83'	Stadium: Ajinomoto Stadium; Referee: Kôichirô Fukushima

2 April 8	Kawasaki Frontale	2–0	Shonan Bellmare	Kawasaki
	Yasuto Wakizaka 50'; Ten Miyagi 90+2'; Sota Miura (yellow card) 17'	Report	Koki Tachi (yellow card) 29'; Akito Suzuki (yellow card) 65'	Stadium: Kawasaki Todoroki Stadium; Attendance: 21,392; Referee: Yoshiro Imamura

6 April 9	Machida Zelvia	2–2	Kawasaki Frontale	Tokyo
	Daihachi Okamura 34' (yellow card) 21'; Takuma Nishimura 53'; Yuki Soma (yellow card) 41'	Report	Erison 16'; So Kawahara 73'	Stadium: Japan National Stadium; Attendance: 11,974; Referee: Hiroyuki Kimura

9 April 5 (Rescheduled)	Kawasaki Frontale	3–3	Yokohama F. Marinos	Kawasaki
	Yuto Ozeki 7' (yellow card) 76'; César Haydar 67'; Kota Takai 90+10'	Report	Yan Matheus 41', 90+2'; Jun Amano 89'; Jean Claude (yellow card) 79'	Stadium: Kawasaki Todoroki Stadium; Attendance: 21,478; Referee: Takafumi Mikuriya

12 April 10	Shimizu S-Pulse	1–1	Kawasaki Frontale	Shizuoka
	Koya Kitagawa 62'; Yuji Takahashi (yellow card) 42'; Kai Matsuzaki (yellow card) 15'; Kengo Kitazume (red card) 84'	Report	Yuki Yamamoto 62'; Kota Takai (yellow card) 45'	Stadium: IAI Stadium Nihondaira; Attendance: 17,629; Referee: Atsushi Kamimura

16 April 11	Vissel Kobe	2–1	Kawasaki Frontale	Kobe
	Daiju Sasaki 31'; Matheus Thuler 45'	Report	Marcinho 45+3' (yellow card) 12'; Erison (yellow card) 45+2'	Stadium: Noevir Stadium Kobe; Attendance: 11,019; Referee: Masuya Ueda

20 April 12	Kawasaki Frontale	0–0	Tokyo Verdy	Kawasaki
		Report		Stadium: Kawasaki Todoroki Stadium; Attendance: 21,870; Referee: Akihiko Ikeuchi

11 May 13	Kashima Antlers	2–1	Kawasaki Frontale	Tokyo
	Yu Funabashi 45+1'; Kyosuke Tagawa 65'; Kim Tae-hyeon (yellow card) 35'	Report	Asahi Sasaki 7' (yellow card) 44'	Stadium: Japan National Stadium; Attendance: 59,574; Referee: Futoshi Nakamura

14 May 14	Kawasaki Frontale	2–1	Yokohama FC	Kawasaki
	Yuki Yamamoto 33'; Boniface Nduka 83' (o.g.)	Report	Yuri Lara 14'; Kota Yamada (yellow card) 32'; Makito Ito (yellow card) 60'	Stadium: Kawasaki Todoroki Stadium; Attendance: 20,175; Referee: Yusuke Araki

18 May 15	Kawasaki Frontale	2–0	Cerezo Osaka	Kawasaki
	Erison 85', 88'; Asahi Sasaki (yellow card) 54'	Report		Stadium: Kawasaki Todoroki Stadium; Attendance: 22,070; Referee: Yusuke Ohashi

21 May 16	Kawasaki Frontale	2–2	Urawa Red Diamonds	Kawasaki
	Marcinho 45+3'; Yusuke Segawa 86'; Yuichi Maruyama (yellow card) 20'	Report	Shoya Nakajima 43'; Tomoaki Ōkubo 90+3'; Danilo Boza (yellow card) 45'; Yoichi Naganuma (yellow card) 50'; Kaito Yasui (yellow card) 67'	Stadium: Kawasaki Todoroki Stadium; Attendance: 20,302; Referee: Jumpei Iida

25 May 17	Kawasaki Frontale	2–2	Gamba Osaka	Kawasaki
	Marcinho 32'; Tatsuya Ito 79'; Shin Yamada 90+7'	Report	Takashi Usami 53'; Ryoya Yamashita 60' (yellow card) 87'; Dani Poyatos (yellow card) 81'; Shinnosuke Nakatani 90+7'	Stadium: Kawasaki Todoroki Stadium; Attendance: 21,440; Referee: Keigo Sendachi

31 May 18	Sanfrecce Hiroshima	1–2	Kawasaki Frontale	Hiroshima
	Hayato Araki 86'; Naoki Maeda (yellow card) 90+4'	Report	Marcinho 50'; Asahi Sasaki 90+1'; Akihiro Ienaga (yellow card) 75'; Yusuke Segawa (yellow card) 84'	Stadium: Edion Peace Wing Hiroshima; Attendance: 25,909; Referee: Martin Petersen (Germany)

14 June 19	Yokohama FC	0–1	Kawasaki Frontale	Yokohama
	Towa Yamane (yellow card) 20'; Musashi Suzuki (yellow card) 27'	Report	Yuki Yamamoto (yellow card) 58'	Stadium: Mitsuzawa Stadium; Attendance: 11,188; Referee: Masuya Ueda

21 June 20	Kawasaki Frontale	1–2	Vissel Kobe	Kawasaki
	Yasuto Wakizaka 6'; Kota Takai (yellow card) 75'	Report	Taisei Miyashiro 10', 52'; Gōtoku Sakai (yellow card) 47'; Gustavo Klismahn (yellow card) 88'	Stadium: Kawasaki Todoroki Stadium; Attendance: 23,103; Referee: Łukasz Kuźma (Poland)

25 June 21	Kawasaki Frontale	3–1	Albirex Niigata	Kawasaki
	Yasuto Wakizaka 12'; Soma Kanda 35'; Yuto Ozeki 90+1'	Report	Jin Okumura 90+5'; Soya Fujiwara (yellow card) 34'; Yuto Horigome (yellow card) 50'	Stadium: Kawasaki Todoroki Stadium; Attendance: 20,905; Referee: Shu Kawamata

29 June 22	Tokyo Verdy	1–0	Kawasaki Frontale	Chōfu
	Daiki Fukazawa 32'; Kazuya Miyahara (yellow card) 67'; Matheus (yellow card) 77'; Hiroto Taniguchi (yellow card) 90'	Report	Tatsuya Ito (yellow card) 69'	Stadium: Ajinomoto Stadium; Attendance: 22,326; Referee: Koei Koya

5 July 23	Kawasaki Frontale	2–1	Kashima Antlers	Kawasaki
	Tatsuya Ito 45+4'; Marcinho 58'; Jesiel (yellow card) 80'; Asahi Sasaki (yellow card) 83'	Report	Léo Ceará 25'; Yuma Suzuki (yellow card) 43'; Kimito Nnomo (yellow card) 90+3'	Stadium: Kawasaki Todoroki Stadium; Attendance: 23,675; Referee: Yusuke Araki

20 July 24	Gamba Osaka	2–1	Kawasaki Frontale	Osaka
	Shu Kurata 45+3'; Deniz Hümmet 57' (yellow card) 35'; Welton Felipe (yellow card) 65'	Report	Yu Kobayashi 9'	Stadium: Suita City Football Stadium; Attendance: 31,898; Referee: Futoshi Nakamura

9 August 25	Kawasaki Frontale	2–5	Avispa Fukuoka	Kawasaki
	Kento Tachibanada 4'; Erison 28'; Filip Uremović (red card) 16'; Sai van Wermeskerken (yellow card) 22' (yellow-red card) 45+7'; Yuki Yamamoto (yellow card) 63'; Kento Tachibanada (yellow card) 71'; Akihiro Ienaga (yellow card) 90+4'	Report	Shintaro Nago 24', 73' (pen.); Erison 35' (o.g.); Shosei Usui 85'; Kazuya Konno 88'	Stadium: Kawasaki Todoroki Stadium; Attendance: 22,062; Referee: Hayato Shimizu

16 August 26	Albirex Niigata	1–1	Kawasaki Frontale	Niigata
	Eiji Shirai 7'; Ryuga Tashiro (yellow card) 55'; Soya Fujiwara (yellow card) 90+5'	Report	Tatsuya Ito 45+1'; Marcinho (yellow card) 45'; Yuki Yamamoto (yellow card) 85'	Stadium: Denka Big Swan Stadium; Attendance: 26,493; Referee: Atsushi Kamimura

23 August 27	Nagoya Grampus	3–4	Kawasaki Frontale	Toyota
	Soichiro Mori 32'; Teruki Hara 45+3'; Ryuji Izumi 81'; Kasper Junker (red card) 51'; Yuki Nogami (yellow card) 87'	Report	Tatsuya Ito 7', 90+5' (yellow card) 90+6'; Erison 18', 80' (yellow card) 45+4'; So Kawahara (yellow card) 89'	Stadium: Toyota Stadium; Attendance: 40,055; Referee: Daichi Shiino

31 August 28	Kawasaki Frontale	5–3	Machida Zelvia	Kawasaki
	Tatsuya Ito 20'; Erison 45+4', 78'; Ten Miyagi 65'; Marcinho 90+10' (yellow card) 90+11'	Report	Na Sangho 28'; Hokuto Shimoda 36'; Yuki Soma 71'; Ibrahim Drešević (yellow card) 59'; Gen Shoji (yellow card) 82'	Stadium: Kawasaki Todoroki Stadium; Attendance: 22,270; Referee: Kôichirô Fukushima

13 September 29	Yokohama F. Marinos	0–3	Kawasaki Frontale	Yokohama
	Takuya Kida (yellow card) 28'; Ryotaro Tsunoda (yellow card) 53'; Tōichi Suzuki (red card) 60'; Ryō Miyaichi (yellow card) 82'	Report	Tatsuya Ito 4'; Erison 62' (pen.); Ten Miyagi 90+8'	Stadium: Nissan Stadium; Attendance: 41,221; Referee: Yūsuke Ōhashi

20 September 30	Kawasaki Frontale	0–1	FC Tokyo	Kawasaki
	Keita Endo 23'; Marcinho (yellow card) 75'; Yasuto Wakizaka (yellow card) 90+3'	Report	Kanta Doi (yellow card) 59'	Stadium: Kawasaki Todoroki Stadium; Attendance: 22,338; Referee: Faisal Al-Balawi (Saudi Arabia)

23 September 31	Shonan Bellmare	1–2	Kawasaki Frontale	Hiratsuka
	Koki Tachi 83'; Kohei Okuno (yellow card) 64'; Hiroya Matsumoto (yellow card) 78'	Report	Yasuto Wakizaka 28'; Tatsuya Ito 80'; Sai Van Wermeskerken (yellow card) 69'; Erison (yellow card) 70'	Stadium: Lemon Gas Stadium Hiratsuka; Attendance: 12,769; Referee: Koei Koya

28 September 32	Kawasaki Frontale	4–4	Kashiwa Reysol	Kawasaki
	Lazar Romanić 7' (pen.), 79'; Tatsuya Ito 45+5'; Yasuto Wakizaka 51' (yellow card) 34'; Louis Yamaguchi (yellow card) 49'; Yuki Yamamoto (yellow card) 57'	Report	Yuki Kakita 15'; Diego Jara Rodrigues 39'; Nobuteru Nakagawa 65'; Hiromu Mitsumaru 90' (yellow card) 88'; Daiki Sugioka (yellow card) 6'	Stadium: Kawasaki Todoroki Stadium; Attendance: 21,652; Referee: Koki Nagamine

4 October 33	Kyoto Sanga	1–1	Kawasaki Frontale	Kyoto
	Hidehiro Sugai 38'; Taiki Hirato (yellow card) 58'; Fūki Yamada (yellow card) 59'; Shun Nagasawa (yellow card) 76'	Report	Tatsuya Ito 8'; Kento Tachibanada (yellow card) 77'; Lazar Romanić (yellow card) 84' (yellow-red card) 88'	Stadium: Sanga Stadium by Kyocera; Attendance: 19,265; Referee: Atsushi Kamimura

18 October 34	Kawasaki Frontale	5–3	Shimizu S-Pulse	Kawasaki
	Yasuto Wakizaka 4'; Asahi Sasaki 7'; Tatsuya Ito 13'; Erison 37' (yellow card) 54'; So Kawahara 69'	Report	Kazuki Kozuka 45+5'; Toshiki Takahashi 47'; Koya Kitagawa 90+2' (pen.)	Stadium: Kawasaki Todoroki Stadium; Attendance: 22,292; Referee: Shu Kawamata

25 October 35	Cerezo Osaka	2–0	Kawasaki Frontale	Osaka
	Rafael Ratão 4'; Shunta Tanaka 7'	Report	Filip Uremović (yellow card) 79'	Stadium: Yodoko Sakura Stadium; Attendance: 17,360; Referee: Ryo Tanimoto

8 November 36	Kawasaki Frontale	1–1	Fagiano Okayama	Kawasaki
	Yuki Yamamoto 84'; Erison (yellow card) 44'	Report	Masaya Matsumoto 90+4'; Werik Popó (yellow card) 80'	Stadium: Kawasaki Todoroki Stadium; Attendance: 23,343; Referee: Hayato Shimizu

30 November 37	Kawasaki Frontale	1–2	Sanfrecce Hiroshima	Kawasaki
	Tatsuya Ito 12' (yellow card) 33'; So Kawahara (yellow card) 72'; Jesiel (yellow card) 84'	Report	Hayao Kawabe 45+4'; Sota Nakamura 56'; Sota Koshimichi (yellow card) 23'	Stadium: Kawasaki Todoroki Stadium; Attendance: 23,173; Referee: Koji Takasaki

6 December 38	Urawa Red Diamonds	4–0	Kawasaki Frontale	Saitama
	Samuel Gustafson 44'; Thiago Santana 54'; Kenta Nemoto 58'; Isaac Kiese Thelin 77' (yellow card) 65'; Marius Høibråten (yellow card) 45+2'	Report	Filip Uremović 44' (yellow card) 72'	Stadium: Saitama Stadium 2002; Attendance: 47,878; Referee: Koei Koya

=== J.League Cup ===
3 September Prime round QF Leg 1	Urawa Red Diamonds	1–1	Kawasaki Frontale	Saitama
	Shoya Nakajima 22'; Hirokazu Ishihara (yellow card) 90'	Report	Tatsuya Ito 90+5'	Stadium: Saitama Stadium 2002; Attendance: 19,767; Referee: Takafumi Mikuriya

7 September Prime round QF Leg 2	Kawasaki Frontale	3–2 (a.e.t.) (4–3 agg.)	Urawa Red Diamonds	Kawasaki
	Erison 18' (pen.); Tatsuya Ito 88'; Ten Miyagi 96'; Filip Uremović (yellow card) 90+1'	Report	Isaac Kiese Thelin 74' (yellow card) 110'; Shoya Nakajima 90'; Hiiro Komori (yellow card) 62'; Hirokazu Ishihara (yellow card) 114'	Stadium: Kawasaki Todoroki Stadium; Attendance: 23,214; Referee: Yusuke Araki

8 October Semi Final Leg 1	Kawasaki Frontale	3–1	Kashiwa Reysol	Kawasaki
	Yuki Yamamoto 10'; Sai van Wermeskerken 23'; Tatsuya Ito 85'; Filip Uremović (yellow card) 32'	Report	Yoshio Koizumi 63'; Riki Harakawa (yellow card) 37'	Stadium: Kawasaki Todoroki Stadium; Attendance: 19,505; Referee: Yudai Yamamoto

12 October Semi Final Leg 2	Kashiwa Reysol	4–1 (5–4 agg.)	Kawasaki Frontale	Kashiwa
	Yuki Kakita 26'; Hayato Nakama 73'; Mao Hosoya 76', 90+2'; Nobuteru Nakagawa (yellow card) 82'	Report	Yasuto Wakizaka 4'; Sai Van Wermeskerken (yellow card) 45+2'; Filip Uremovic (red card) 56'; Lazar Romanic (yellow card) 76'	Stadium: Sankyo Frontier Kashiwa Stadium; Attendance: 14,093; Referee: Yoshiro Imamura

=== Emperor's Cup ===
11 June Second round	Kawasaki Frontale	4–3	Fukushima United	Kawasaki
	Shin Yamada 29', 51'; Yasuto Wakizaka 64'; Yu Kobayashi 84'	Report	Kota Mori 8'; Kiichi Yajima 89'; Kano Kaisei 90+1'; Hayate Toma (yellow card) 21'	Stadium: Kawasaki Todoroki Stadium; Attendance: 7,942; Referee: Yoshimi Yamashita

16 July Third round	Kawasaki Frontale	0–0 (a.e.t.) (1–3 p)	SC Sagamihara (J3)	Kawasaki
		Report	Rafael Furtado (yellow card) 92'	Stadium: Kawasaki Todoroki Stadium; Attendance: 8,661; Referee: Jumpei Iida

=== 2024–25 AFC Champions League Elite ===
Pos	Team	Pld	W	D	L	GF	GA	GD	Pts	Qualification
1	(Japan) Yokohama F. Marinos	7	6	0	1	21	7	+14	18	Advance to round of 16
2	(Japan) Kawasaki Frontale	7	5	0	2	13	4	+9	15	Advance to round of 16
3	(Malaysia) Johor Darul Ta'zim	7	4	2	1	16	8	+8	14	Advance to round of 16
4	(South Korea) Gwangju	7	4	2	1	15	9	+6	14	Advance to round of 16
5	(Japan) Vissel Kobe	7	4	1	2	14	9	+5	13	Advance to round of 16

Source: Asian Football Confederation
Rules for classification: 1) points; 2) goal difference; 3) number of goals scored; 4) number of matches won; 5) penalty shoot-out if only two teams remain tied and played each other on the final matchday 6) fair play ranking; 7) drawing of lots

Win Draw Loss

==== League stage ====
11 February 2025 7	Pohang Steelers (South Korea)	0–4	(Japan) Kawasaki Frontale	Pohang, South Korea
19:00 UTC+9	Oberdan (yellow card) 9'; Jonathan Aspropotamitis (yellow card) 28' (yellow-red card) 43'; Lee Dong-hee (yellow card) 90'	Report	Shin Yamada 38'; Yasuto Wakizaka 71'; So Kawahara 74'; Erison 88'; Kento Tachibanada (yellow card) 31'	Stadium: Pohang Steel Yard; Attendance: 4,007; Referee: Nazmi Nasaruddin (Malaysia)

18 February 2025 8	Kawasaki Frontale (Japan)	2–0	(Australia) Central Coast Mariners FC	Kawasaki, Japan
19:00 UTC+9	Erison 36' (pen.); Marcinho 90+8'	Report	Alou Kuol (yellow card) 56'	Stadium: Kawasaki Todoroki Stadium; Attendance: 11,013; Referee: Sivakorn Pu-udom (Thailand)

==== Knockout stage ====
5 March 2025 R16 Leg 1	Shanghai Shenhua (China)	1–0	(Japan) Kawasaki Frontale	Shanghai, China
20:00 UTC+8	Kota Takai 76' (o.g.); Nico Yennaris (yellow card) 5'	Report	Marcinho (yellow card) 42'; Asahi Sasaki (yellow card) 90+2'	Stadium: Shanghai Stadium; Attendance: 20,837; Referee: Salman Falahi (Qatar)

12 March 2025 R16 Leg 2	Kawasaki Frontale (Japan)	4–0 (4–1 agg.)	(China) Shanghai Shenhua	Kawasaki, Japan
19:00 UTC+9	Asahi Sasaki 24'; Erison 64'; Tatsuya Ito 68'; Marcinho 90+1'; Yasuto Wakizaka (yellow card) 42'	Report	Shinichi Chan (yellow card) 57'	Stadium: Kawasaki Todoroki Stadium; Attendance: 13,277; Referee: Omar Mohamed Al-Ali (United Arab Emirates)

27 April 2025 Quarter Final	Kawasaki Frontale (Japan)	3–2 (a.e.t.)	(Qatar) Al Sadd	Jeddah, Saudi Arabia
19:30 UTC+3	Erison 4'; Marcinho 21'; Yasuto Wakizaka 98'	Report	Paulo Otávio 9'; Claudinho 71'	Stadium: Prince Abdullah Al-Faisal Sports City; Attendance: 2,873; Referee: Ma Ning (China)

30 April 2025 Semi Final	Al-Nassr (Saudi Arabia)	2–3	(Japan) Kawasaki Frontale	Jeddah, Saudi Arabia
19:30 UTC+3	Sadio Mané 28'; Ayman Yahya 87'; Ali Lajami (yellow card) 37'	Report	Tatsuya Ito 10'; Yuto Ozeki 41'; Akihiro Ienaga 76'; Erison (yellow card) 90+4'	Stadium: King Abdullah Sports City Stadium; Attendance: 28,810; Referee: Alireza Faghani (Australia)

3 May 2025 Final	Al-Ahli (Saudi Arabia)	2–0	(Japan) Kawasaki Frontale	King Abdullah Sports City, Jeddah
19:30 UTC+3	Galeno 35'; Franck Kessié 42'; Merih Demiral (yellow card) 44'; Ziyad Al-Johani (yellow card) 84'; Édouard Mendy (yellow card) 90+1'	Report		Referee: Abdulrahman Al-Jassim (Qatar)

== Team statistics ==
=== Appearances and goals ===
As of 6 December 2025

No.	Pos.	Player	J1 League		Emperor's Cup		J.League Cup		2024–25 AFC Champions League Elite		Total	
No.	Pos.	Player	Apps	Goals	Apps	Goals	Apps	Goals	Apps	Goals	Apps	Goals
1	GK	(South Korea) Jung Sung-ryong	3+1	0	1	0	2	0	0	0	7	0
4	DF	(Brazil) Jesiel	8+4	0	1	0	1	0	0	0	14	0
5	DF	(Japan) Asahi Sasaki	33+3	3	0+1	0	4	0	4+2	1	47	4
6	MF	(Japan) Yuki Yamamoto	29+5	4	1	0	3+1	1	5+1	0	45	5
7	DF	(Japan) Shintaro Kurumaya	2+1	0	1	0	0	0	1	0	5	0
8	MF	(Japan) Kento Tachibanada	14+15	1	2	0	1+3	0	3+2	0	40	1
9	FW	(Brazil) Erison	19+9	10	0	0	3	1	4+3	4	38	15
10	MF	(Japan) Ryota Oshima	3+1	0	0	0	0+1	0	1	0	6	0
11	DF	(Japan) Yu Kobayashi	3+10	1	1+1	1	0+1	0	0	0	16	2
13	MF	(Japan) Sota Miura	22+1	0	2	0	3	0	6	0	34	0
14	MF	(Japan) Yasuto Wakizaka	32+3	7	1+1	1	4	1	5+2	2	48	11
15	DF	(Japan) Shuto Tanabe	4+5	0	1	0	1+3	0	1	0	15	0
16	MF	(Japan) Yuto Ozeki	3+22	2	0+1	0	0+1	0	1+3	1	32	3
17	FW	(Japan) Tatsuya Ito	26+8	11	0+2	0	3+1	3	4+2	2	45	16
19	DF	(Japan) So Kawahara	28+7	1	1+1	0	4	0	5+2	1	48	2
21	GK	(Japan) Shunsuke Andō	0	0	0	0	0	0	1	0	1	0
22	DF	(Croatia) Filip Uremović	8+2	0	0	0	4	0	0	0	14	0
23	FW	(Brazil) Marcinho	33+4	7	2	0	4	0	6+1	3	50	10
24	FW	(Japan) Ten Miyagi	0+20	4	0+1	0	1+2	1	1+1	0	26	5
27	DF	(Japan) Ryota Kamihashi	0+3	0	0	0	0+4	0	0	0	7	0
29	MF	(Japan) Toya Myogan	0+1	0	0	0	0	0	0	0	1	0
30	DF	(Japan) Hiroto Noda	0+3	0	0+1	0	0	0	0	0	4	0
31	DF	(Japan) (Netherlands) Sai van Wermeskerken	23+2	0	1	0	3+1	1	3+2	0	32	1
35	DF	(Japan) Yuichi Maruyama	23+1	0	1	0	0	0	6+1	0	32	0
36	FW	(Japan) Kyosuke Mochiyama	0+1	0	0	0	0	0	0	0	1	0
38	FW	(Japan) Soma Kanda	2+6	1	0+1	0	1	0	1	0	11	1
39	DF	(Japan) Kaito Tsuchiya	0+1	0	0+1	0	0+2	0	0	0	4	0
41	MF	(Japan) Akihiro Ienaga	12+17	1	2	0	0+1	0	3+3	1	37	2
44	DF	(Colombia) César Haydar	3	1	1	0	0	0	1	0	5	1
91	FW	(Serbia) Lazar Romanić	2+6	2	0	0	0+4	0	0	0	12	2
98	GK	(Japan) (France) Louis Yamaguchi	34	0	1	0	2	0	6	0	43	0
Players featured on a match for the team, but left the club on loan transfer
3	DF	(Japan) Takuma Ominami	0	0	0	0	0	0	0	0	0	0
6	MF	(Brazil) Zé Ricardo	0	0	0	0	0	0	0	0	0	0
22	GK	(Japan) Yuki Hayasaka	0	0	0	0	0	0	0	0	0	0
26	MF	(Japan) Hinata Yamauchi	1+1	1	1	0	0	0	1+2	0	6	1
28	FW	(Brazil) Patrick Verhon	2	0	0	0	0	0	0+2	0	4	0
Players featured on a match for the team, but left the club permanently
2	DF	(Japan) Kota Takai	21+1	2	0	0	0	0	6	0	28	2
18	MF	(Japan) Yusuke Segawa	1+7	1	0	0	0	0	0+3	0	11	1
20	FW	(Japan) Shin Yamada	12+9	2	1	2	0	0	2+4	1	28	5
