= 2026 Kawasaki Frontale season =

Kawasaki Frontale
2026 season
- Owner: Fujitsu
- Chairman: Yoshihiro Warashina
- Stadium: Kawasaki Todoroki Stadium; Kawasaki, Kanagawa
- Average home league attendance: 25,212
Home colours	Away colours

The 2026 season was Kawasaki Frontale's 30th season in history.

== Players ==
No.	Name	Nationality	Date of birth (age)	Previous club	Contract since	Contract end
Goalkeepers
1	Louis Yamaguchi	(Japan) (France)	28 May 1998 (age 28)	(Japan) FC Machida Zelvia	2024	2025
21	Yuki Hayasaka	(Japan)	22 May 1999 (age 27)	(Japan) Iwaki FC	2022	
33	Lee Keun-hyeong	(South Korea)	22 May 2006 (age 20)	(South Korea) Boin High School	2025	2027
49	Svend Brodersen	(Germany)	22 March 1997 (age 29)	(Japan) Fagiano Okayama	2026	2027
Defenders
2	Yuto Matsunagane	(Japan)	14 September 2004 (age 22)	(Japan) Fukushima United		
3	Hiroto Taniguchi	(Japan)	30 September 1999 (age 27)	(Japan) Tokyo Verdy	2026	2027
5	Asahi Sasaki	(Japan)	26 January 2000 (age 26)	(Japan) Ryutsu Keizai University	2022	
13	Sota Miura	(Japan)	7 September 2000 (age 26)	(Japan) Ventforet Kofu	2024	
22	Filip Uremović	(Croatia)	11 February 1997 (age 29)	(Croatia) Hajduk Split	2025	2028
27	Ryota Kamihashi	(Japan)	16 June 2002 (age 24)	(Japan) Waseda University	2025	
28	Yuichi Maruyama	(Japan)	16 June 1989 (age 37)	(Japan) Nagoya Grampus	2024	
29	Reon Yamahara	(Japan)	8 June 1999 (age 27)	(Japan) Shimizu S-Pulse	2026	2027
30	Hiroto Noda	(Japan)	5 April 2006 (age 20)	(Japan) Shizuoka Gakuen School	2025	
31	Noriharu Kan	(Japan) (China)	11 April 2007 (age 19)	Youth Team		
32	Shunsuke Hayashi	(Japan)	29 May 2007 (age 19)	Youth Team		
	Tetsuya Takahashi	(Japan)	15 January 2005 (age 21)	(Japan) Kansai University		
Midfielders
6	Yuki Yamamoto	(Japan)	6 November 1997 (age 28)	(Japan) Gamba Osaka	2024	
8	Kento Tachibanada	(Japan)	29 May 1998 (age 28)	(Japan) Toin University of Yokohama	2020	2027
10	Ryota Oshima	(Japan)	23 January 1993 (age 33)	(Japan) J.League U-22 Selection	2011	
14	Yasuto Wakizaka	(Japan)	11 June 1995 (age 31)	(Japan) Hannan University	2018	
15	Toya Myogan	(Japan)	29 June 2004 (age 22)	(Japan) Vegalta Sendai		
16	Yuto Ozeki	(Japan)	6 February 2005 (age 21)	(Japan) Fukushima United		
19	So Kawahara	(Japan)	13 March 1998 (age 28)	(Japan) Sagan Tosu	2024	
25	Shuto Yamaichi	(Japan)	20 January 2004 (age 22)	(Japan) Waseda University	2026	
26	Kota Yui	(Japan)	10 June 2005 (age 21)	(Japan) Fukushima United		
34	Ryuki Osa	(Japan)	13 October 2007 (age 19)	(Japan) Shohei High School		
41	Akihiro Ienaga	(Japan)	13 June 1986 (age 40)	(Japan) Omiya Ardija	2017	
Forwards
9	Erison	(Brazil)	13 April 1999 (age 27)	(Brazil) São Paulo	2024	2027
11	Yu Kobayashi	(Japan)	23 September 1987 (age 39)	(Japan) Mito HollyHock	2008	
17	Tatsuya Ito	(Japan)	26 June 1997 (age 29)	(Germany) 1. FC Magdeburg	2025	
18	Kazuya Konno	(Japan)	11 July 1997 (age 29)	(Japan) Avispa Fukuoka	2026	2027
20	Kyosuke Mochiyama	(Japan)	18 August 2003 (age 23)	(Japan) Chuo University	2025	
23	Marcinho	(Brazil)	16 May 1995 (age 31)	(China) Chongqing Lifan	2021	
24	Ten Miyagi	(Japan)	2 June 2001 (age 25)	(Japan) Montedio Yamagata	2020	
38	Soma Kanda	(Japan)	29 December 2005 (age 20)	(Japan) Shizuoka Gakuen School	2025	2027
91	Lazar Romanić	(Serbia)	25 March 1998 (age 28)	(Serbia) Vojvodina	2025	
Players who left on loan/mid-season
26	Takatora Einaga	(Japan)	7 April 2003 (age 23)	(Japan) FC Ryukyu	2021	
28	Patrick Verhon	(Brazil)	8 September 2004 (age 22)	(Japan) FC Imabari	2024	
39	Kaito Tsuchiya	(Japan)	12 May 2006 (age 20)	Youth Team	2022	2028
44	César Haydar	(Colombia)	31 March 2001 (age 25)	(Brazil) Red Bull Bragantino	2024	2024
Players who left permanently in mid-season

== Friendly & Pre-season ==
Win Draw Loss

=== Tour of Okinawa (11 Jan - 24 Jan) ===
16 January 1	FC Ryukyu	1–6	Kawasaki Frontale	Okinawa
	Hayato Asakaw	Report		Stadium: Akama Sports Park Soccer Field

25 January 2	–	Kawasaki Frontale	Okinawa
			Stadium: Akama Sports Park Soccer Field

== Transfers ==
=== In ===
Pre-season

Date	Position	Player	Transferred from	Ref
Permanent Transfer
15 December 2025	GK	(Germany) Svend Brodersen	(Japan) Fagiano Okayama	Free
17 December 2025	FW	(Japan) Kazuya Konno	(Japan) Avispa Fukuoka	Free
19 December 2025	DF	(Japan) Hiroto Taniguchi	(Japan) Tokyo Verdy	Free
21 December 2025	DF	(Japan) Reon Yamahara	(Japan) Shimizu S-Pulse	Free
22 December 2025	GK	(Japan) Yuki Hayasaka	(Japan) Iwaki FC	End of loan
24 December 2025	DF	(Japan) Yuto Matsunagane	(Japan) Fukushima United	End of loan
24 December 2025	MF	(Japan) Kota Yui	(Japan) Fukushima United	End of loan
25 December 2025	FW	(Japan) Taiyo Igarashi	(Japan) Renofa Yamaguchi	End of loan
27 December 2025	MF	(Brazil) Zé Ricardo	(Japan) Shonan Bellmare	End of loan
29 December 2025	MF	(Japan) Hinata Yamauchi	(Japan) Vegalta Sendai	End of loan
2 January 2026	FW	(Brazil) Patrick Verhon	(Japan) FC Imabari	End of loan
3 January 2026	FW	(Japan) Takatora Einaga	(Japan) FC Ryukyu	End of loan
Loan Transfer

Post-season

Date	Position	Player	Transferred from	Ref
Permanent Transfer
30 June 2026	DF	(Japan) Kaito Tsuchiya	(Japan) Fukushima United	End of loan
30 June 2026	FW	(Japan) Takatora Einaga	(Japan) Fukushima United	End of loan
30 June 2026	FW	(Brazil) Patrick Verhon	(Japan) Oita Trinita	End of loan
8 June 2026	DF	(Japan) Tetsuya Takahashi	(Japan) Kansai University	Free
June 2026	FW	(Japan) Shōgo Taniguchi	(Belgium) Sint-Truidense	Undisclosed
Loan Transfer

=== Out ===
Pre-season

Date	Position	Player	Transferred To	Ref
Permanent Transfer
12 November 2025	GK	(South Korea) Jung Sung-ryong	(Japan) Fukushima United (Note: Jung Sung-ryong moves to Fukushima United on 24 Dec)	Free
17 November 2025	DF	(Japan) Shintaro Kurumaya	Retired	N.A.
23 November 2025	GK	(Japan) Shunsuke Andō	Retired	N.A.
23 November 2025	DF	(Brazil) Jesiel	(South Korea)	Free
18 December 2025	DF	(Japan) (Netherlands) Sai van Wermeskerken	(South Korea)	Free
25 December 2025	FW	(Japan) Taiyo Igarashi	(Japan) Tochigi SC	Free.
28 December 2025	MF	(Brazil) Zé Ricardo	(Brazil) Remo	Free
29 December 2025	DF	(Japan) Shuto Tanabe	(Japan) Tokyo Verdy	Free
3 January 2026	MF	(Japan) Hinata Yamauchi	(Japan) Kashiwa Reysol	Free
Loan Transfer
18 July 2025	DF	(Colombia) César Haydar	(Colombia) Atlético Nacional	Season loan
28 December 2025	DF	(Japan) Kaito Tsuchiya	(Japan) Fukushima United	Season loan
3 January 2026	FW	(Brazil) Patrick Verhon	(Japan) Oita Trinita	Season loan
4 January 2026	FW	(Japan) Takatora Einaga	(Japan) Fukushima United	Season loan

Post-season

Date	Position	Player	Transferred to	Ref
Permanent Transfer
June 2026	FW	(Brazil) Erison	(Japan) JEF United Chiba	Undisclosed
Loan Transfer

== Competitions ==
=== J1 League ===
Pos	Team	Pld	W	PKW	PKL	L	GF	GA	GD	Pts	Qualification
1	Kashima Antlers	18	13	2	2	1	29	9	+20	45	Final
2	FC Tokyo	18	9	4	2	3	28	16	+12	37	3rd–4th place playoff
3	Machida Zelvia	18	8	5	3	2	23	19	+4	37	5th–6th place playoff
4	Kawasaki Frontale	18	7	3	1	7	23	27	−4	28	7th–8th place playoff
5	Tokyo Verdy	18	7	3	1	7	19	25	−6	28	9th–10th place playoff
6	Urawa Red Diamonds	18	7	0	4	7	25	18	+7	25	11th–12th place playoff
7	Yokohama F. Marinos	18	6	0	2	10	28	29	−1	20	13th–14th place playoff
8	Kashiwa Reysol	18	6	1	0	11	21	24	−3	20	15th–16th place playoff
9	Mito HollyHock	18	2	4	4	8	19	35	−16	18	17th–18th place playoff
10	JEF United Chiba	18	3	0	3	12	18	31	−13	12	19th–20th place playoff

Source: JLeague.co, J.League Data Site
Rules for classification: 1) Points; 2) Goal difference; 3) Goals scored; 4) Head-to-head.

==== Matches ====
8 February 1	Kawasaki Frontale	5–3	Kashiwa Reysol	Kawasaki
	Erison 6' (pen.), 11', 25'; Yuto Matsunagane 68'; Yasuto Wakizaka 90+4'	Report	Mao Hosoya 38'; Yusuke Segawa 61'; Hinata Yamauchi 81'	Stadium: Kawasaki Todoroki Stadium; Attendance: 22,226; Referee: Akihiko Ikeuchi

15 February 2	JEF United Chiba	0–0 (8–9 p)	Kawasaki Frontale	Chiba
	Ryota Kuboniwa (yellow card) 56'; Takayuki Mae (yellow card) 64'; Carlinhos Júnior (yellow card) 70'	Report		Stadium: Fukuda Denshi Arena; Attendance: 16,389; Referee: Koki Nagamine
	Penalties
	Issey Takahashi (penalty scored); Daichi Ishikawa (penalty scored); Yuma Igari (penalty scored); Takashi Kawano (penalty scored); Hiroto Goya (penalty scored); Daisuke Suzuki (penalty scored); Koki Yonekura (penalty scored); Makoto Himeno (penalty scored); Masaru Hidaka (penalty missed); Yūsuke Kobayashi (penalty missed)		Lazar Romanić (penalty scored); Marcinho (penalty scored); Tan Miyagi (penalty scored); Kento Tachibanada (penalty scored); So Kawahara (penalty scored); Sota Miura (penalty scored); Reon Yamahara (penalty scored); Hiroto Taniguchi (penalty scored); Yuto Matsunagane (penalty missed); Akihiro Ienaga (penalty scored)

21 February 3	Kawasaki Frontale	1–2	FC Tokyo	Kawasaki
	Reon Yamahara 31'; Tatsuya Ito (yellow card) 33'; Yasuto Wakizaka (yellow card) 59'; Hiroto Taniguchi (yellow card) 90'	Report	Marcelo Ryan 18'; Sei Muroya 38'; Divine Chinedu Otani (yellow card) 90+3'; Yūto Nagatomo (yellow card) 90+4'	Stadium: Kawasaki Todoroki Stadium; Attendance: 22,672; Referee: Koji Takasaki

1 March 4	Kawasaki Frontale	2–2 (4–2 p)	Mito HollyHock	Kawasaki
	Erison 84' (pen.); Yasuto Wakizaka 90+3'	Report	Kato Chihiro 45', 45+4'; Hayata Yamamoto (yellow card) 9'; Takumi Mase (yellow card) 30'; Yuto Yamashita (yellow card) 77'	Stadium: Kawasaki Todoroki Stadium; Attendance: 22,779; Referee: Daichi Shiino
	Penalties
	Erison (penalty scored); Yasuto Wakizaka (penalty scored); Tan Miyagi (penalty scored); Kento Tachibanada (penalty scored)		Koshi Osaki (penalty scored); Keisuke Tada (penalty missed); Sho Omori (penalty scored); Takahiro Ilda (penalty missed)

28 March 5 (Rescheduled)	Machida Zelvia	1–1 (3–1 p)	Kawasaki Frontale	Tokyo
	Erik 41' (red card) 78'; Hiroyuki Mae (yellow card) 90+4'	Report	Erison 59'	Stadium: Machida GION Stadium; Attendance: 11,316; Referee: Masuya Ueda
	Penalties
	Yuki Soma (penalty scored); Yuta Nakayama (penalty missed); Na Sang-ho (penalty scored); Ibrahim Drešević (penalty scored)		Lazar Romanić (penalty missed); Yuki Yamamoto (penalty scored); Yu Kobayashi (penalty missed); So Kawahara (penalty missed)

14 March 6	Kashima Antlers	1–0	Kawasaki Frontale	Kashima
	Léo Ceará 79'; Kyosuke Tagawa (yellow card) 90'	Report		Stadium: Kashima Soccer Stadium; Attendance: 24,916; Referee: Atsushi Kamimura

18 March 7	Tokyo Verdy	0–2	Kawasaki Frontale	Chōfu
	Yuta Arai (yellow card) 20'; Riku Matsuda (yellow card) 47'	Report	Yasuto Wakizaka 90'; Erison 23'; Kento Tachibanada (yellow card) 51'; Yuto Matsunagane (yellow card) 65'	Stadium: Ajinomoto Stadium; Attendance: 15,215; Referee: Koki Nagamine

22 March 8	Kawasaki Frontale	0–5	Yokohama F. Marinos	Kawasaki
		Report	Kaina Tanimura 30'; Jun Amano 53', 62'; Yuri Araujo 72'; Jeisson Quinones 78'; Daiya Tōno (yellow card) 45+2'	Stadium: Kawasaki Todoroki Stadium; Attendance: 50,275; Referee: Akihiko Ikeuchi

5 April 9	Kawasaki Frontale	3–2	Urawa Red Diamonds	Kawasaki
	Danilo Boza 10' (pen.); Lazar Romanić 78'; So Kawahara 90+4'; Yasuto Wakizaka (yellow card) 44'; Erison (yellow card) 45+4'	Report	Kenta Nemoto 4'; Takuro Kaneko 58'; Kai Shibato (yellow card) 87'	Stadium: Kawasaki Todoroki Stadium; Attendance: 21,735; Referee: Koichiro Fukushima

12 April 10	Kawasaki Frontale	0–2	Kashima Antlers	Kawasaki
	Sota Miura (yellow card) 65'	Report	Yuma Suzuki 53' (pen.); Léo Ceará 65'; Yūta Matsumura (yellow card) 68'; Haruki Hayashi (yellow card) 90+5'	Stadium: Kawasaki Todoroki Stadium; Attendance: 23,094; Referee: Yuzo Sutani

18 April 11	Yokohama F. Marinos	1–2	Kawasaki Frontale	Yokohama
	Jun Amano 45+2'; Jordy Croux (yellow card) 17'	Report	Lazar Romanić 15'; Erison 90+8' (yellow card) 90+9'	Stadium: Nissan Stadium; Attendance: 26,084; Referee: Atsushi Kamimura

25 April 12	Kawasaki Frontale	2–1	JEF United Chiba	Kawasaki
	Yuki Yamamoto 6'; Marcinho 89' (yellow card) 90'	Report	Rikuto Ishio 86'; Zain Issaka (yellow card) 9'	Stadium: Kawasaki Todoroki Stadium; Attendance: 21,492; Referee: Hiroyuki Kimura

29 April 13	Urawa Red Diamonds	2–0	Kawasaki Frontale	Saitama
	Matheus Sávio 54' (yellow card) 80'; Hiiro Komori 72'	Report		Stadium: Saitama Stadium 2002; Attendance: 30,780; Referee: Takafumi LMikuriya

2 May 14	FC Tokyo	2–0	Kawasaki Frontale	Chōfu
	Kein Sato 41'; Leon Nozawa 56'; Marcelo Ryan (yellow card) 88'	Report	Erison (yellow card) 66'	Stadium: Ajinomoto Stadium; Attendance: 33,991; Referee: Masuya Ueda

6 May 15	Kawasaki Frontale	1–0	Tokyo Verdy	Kawasaki
	Yasuto Wakizaka 74'	Report		Stadium: Kawasaki Todoroki Stadium; Attendance: 21,743; Referee: Damian Kos (Poland)

10 May 16	Kashiwa Reysol	1–0	Kawasaki Frontale	Chiba
	Mao Hosoya 72'	Report		Stadium: Sankyo Frontier Kashiwa Stadium; Attendance: 13,045; Referee: Yusuke Ohashi

17 May 17	Kawasaki Frontale	1–1 (5–4 p)	Machida Zelvia	Kawasaki
	Yasuto Wakizaka 88' (pen.); Lazar Romanic (yellow card) 28'	Report	Tete Yengi 40'; Neta Lavi (yellow card) 90+6'	Stadium: Kawasaki Todoroki Stadium; Attendance: 20,889; Referee: Yusuke Araki
	Penalties
	Yasuto Wakizaka (penalty scored); Yuichi Maruyama (penalty scored); Yuki Yamamoto (penalty missed); Asahi Sasaki (penalty scored); Reon Yamahara (penalty scored); Kyosuke Mochiyama (penalty scored)		Ibrahim Drešević (penalty scored); Yuta Nakayama (penalty missed); Shuto Fujio (penalty scored); Kosei Tani (penalty scored); Neta Lavi (penalty scored); Keiya Sento (penalty missed)

24 May 18	Mito HollyHock	1–3	Kawasaki Frontale	Ibaraki
	Patryck Ferreira 90'	Report	Kyosuke Mochiyama 58', 77', 84'	Stadium: K's denki Stadium Mito; Attendance: 8,524; Referee: Yoshi Yamashita

30 May Placement Leg 1	Sanfrecce Hiroshima	2–1	Kawasaki Frontale	Hiroshima
	Sota Nakamura 11'; Mutsuki Kato 20'	Report	Tatsuya Ito 43'; Marcinho (yellow card) 35'	Stadium: Edion Peace Wing Hiroshima; Attendance: 25,885; Referee: Koji Takasaki

6 June Placement Leg 2	Kawasaki Frontale	0–1 (1–3 agg.)	Sanfrecce Hiroshima	Kawasaki
	Yuichi Maruyama (yellow card) 24'; Tatsuya Ito (yellow card) 64'	Report	Sota Nakamura 44'; Hayao Kawabe (yellow card) 38'	Stadium: Kawasaki Todoroki Stadium; Attendance: 23,692; Referee: Hiroki Kasahara

== Team statistics ==
=== Appearances and goals ===
As of 6 June 2026

No.	Pos.	Player	J1 League		Total	
No.	Pos.	Player	Apps	Goals	Apps	Goals
1	GK	(Japan) (France) Louis Yamaguchi	5	0	5	0
2	DF	(Japan) Yuto Matsunagane	15	1	15	1
3	DF	(Japan) Hiroto Taniguchi	6	0	6	0
5	DF	(Japan) Asahi Sasaki	3+3	0	6	0
6	MF	(Japan) Yuki Yamamoto	14+4	1	18	1
8	MF	(Japan) Kento Tachibanada	16+3	0	19	0
9	FW	(Brazil) Erison	9+5	7	14	7
10	MF	(Japan) Ryota Oshima	1	0	1	0
11	DF	(Japan) Yu Kobayashi	0+2	0	2	0
13	MF	(Japan) Sota Miura	18+1	0	19	0
14	MF	(Japan) Yasuto Wakizaka	17+1	4	18	4
15	MF	(Japan) Toya Myogan	0+3	0	3	0
16	MF	(Japan) Yuto Ozeki	1+4	0	5	0
17	FW	(Japan) Tatsuya Ito	15+4	1	19	1
18	FW	(Japan) Kazuya Konno	5+4	0	9	0
19	DF	(Japan) So Kawahara	6+12	1	18	1
20	FW	(Japan) Kyosuke Mochiyama	2+2	3	4	3
21	GK	(Japan) Yuki Hayasaka	0	0	0	0
22	DF	(Croatia) Filip Uremović	1	0	1	0
23	FW	(Brazil) Marcinho	11+9	1	20	1
24	FW	(Japan) Ten Miyagi	5+8	0	13	0
25	MF	(Japan) Shuto Yamaichi	0	0	0	0
26	MF	(Japan) Kota Yui	0	0	0	0
27	DF	(Japan) Ryota Kamihashi	0	0	0	0
28	DF	(Japan) Yuichi Maruyama	13+1	0	14	0
29	DF	(Japan) Reon Yamahara	19	1	19	1
30	DF	(Japan) Hiroto Noda	0+1	0	1	0
31	DF	(China) (Japan) Noriharu Kan	0	0	0	0
32	DF	(Japan) Shunsuke Hayashi	1+1	0	2	0
33	GK	(South Korea) Lee Geun-hyeong	0	0	0	0
34	MF	(Japan) Ryuki Osa	1+7	0	8	0
38	FW	(Japan) Soma Kanda	1+7	0	8	0
41	MF	(Japan) Akihiro Ienaga	2+4	0	6	0
49	GK	(Germany) Svend Brodersen	14	0	14	0
91	FW	(Serbia) Lazar Romanić	8+10	2	18	2
