= Erison (footballer) =

Brazilian footballer (born 1999)

Personal information
- Full name: Erison Danilo de Souza
- Date of birth: 13 April 1999 (age 27)
- Place of birth: Cosmópolis, Brazil
- Height: 1.81 m (5 ft 11 in)
- Position: Forward

Team information
- Current team: JEF United Chiba
- Number: 99

Youth career
- 2018–2019: XV de Piracicaba

Senior career*
Years	Team	Apps	(Gls)
2019–2021	XV de Piracicaba	32	(4)
2020–2021	→ Figueirense (loan)	10	(3)
2021	→ Brasil de Pelotas (loan)	19	(8)
2022–2024	Botafogo	32	(15)
2022–2023	→ Estoril (loan)	11	(2)
2023	→ São Paulo (loan)	16	(1)
2024–2026	Kawasaki Frontale	69	(26)
2026–	JEF United Chiba	7	(1)
- * Club domestic league appearances and goals as of 12 August 2026

Erison Danilo de Souza (born 13 April 1999), simply known as Erison, is a Brazilian professional footballer who plays as a forward for J1 League club JEF United Chiba.

== Club career ==
Erison was born in Cosmópolis, São Paulo, and joined XV de Piracicaba's youth setup at the age of 18, after playing amateur tournaments. He made his first team debut on 26 January 2019, coming on as a late substitute in a 0–0 Campeonato Paulista Série A2 home draw against Nacional-SP.

On 30 October 2020, after being a regular starter for XV, Erison was loaned to Série B side Figueirense until the end of the season. After suffering relegation, he returned to his parent club in February 2021.

On 18 August 2021, Erison joined Brasil de Pelotas also in the second division, on a loan deal until December. Despite only playing 19 matches for the side, he ended the campaign as the club's top scorer with eight goals, but was unable to prevent team relegation.

On 21 January 2022, Erison moved to Botafogo on a two-year contract. On 30 August, he was loaned to Primeira Liga side Estoril, for one year.

On 1 February 2023, Botafogo sent Erison on loan to fellow Série A side São Paulo until the end of the year.

On 8 January 2024, Erison moved to Japan, signing for J1 League club Kawasaki Frontale for a reported fee of $3.5 million.

In June 2026, Erison transferred to newly-promoted J1 League club JEF United Chiba.

== Career statistics ==
As of 13 October 2026.

Club	Season	League			State league (Note: Includes Paulista A2, Campeonato Carioca, Campeonato Paulista)		National cup (Note: Includes Copa do Brasil, Taça de Portugal, Emperor's Cup)		League cup (Note: Includes Taça da Liga, J.League Cup)		Continental		Total	
Club	Season	Division	Apps	Goals	Apps	Goals	Apps	Goals	Apps	Goals	Apps	Goals	Apps	Goals
XV de Piracicaba	2019	—			1	0	—		—		—		1	0
XV de Piracicaba	2020	—			17	3	2	0	—		—		19	3
XV de Piracicaba	2021	—			14	1	—		—		—		14	1
XV de Piracicaba	Total		—		32	4	2	0	—		—		34	4
Figueirense (loan)	2020	Série B	10	3	—		—		—		—		10	3
Brasil de Pelotas (loan)	2021	Série B	19	8	—		—		—		—		19	8
Botafogo	2022	Série A	20	7	12	8	2	0	—		—		34	15
Estoril	2022–23	Primeira Liga	11	2	—		1	1	3	1	—		15	4
São Paulo	2023	Série A	13	1	3	0	2	0	—		1 (Note: Appearance in Copa Sudamericana)	2	19	3
Kawasaki Frontale	2024	J1 League	25	7	—		1	1	4	0	2 (Note: Appearances in AFC Champions League Elite)	2	32	10
Kawasaki Frontale	2025	J1 League	29	12	—		0	0	3	1	12	4	44	17
Kawasaki Frontale	2026	J1 (100)	15	7	—		—		—		0	0	15	7
Kawasaki Frontale	Total		69	26	—		1	1	7	1	14	6	91	34
JEF United Chiba	2026–27	J1 League	7	1	—		2	1	1	0	—		10	2
Career total			149	48	47	12	10	3	11	2	15	8	232	73

== Honours ==
São Paulo

- Copa do Brasil: 2023
