= 2021 Japanese Super Cup =

Kawasaki Frontale	Gamba Osaka
3	2
- Date: 20 February 2021
- Venue: Saitama Stadium 2002, Saitama
- Referee: Yusuke Araki
- Attendance: 4,208
- Weather: Fine; 17 °C (63 °F); 31% humidity

The 2021 Japanese Super Cup (known as Fuji Xerox Super Cup 2021 for sponsorship reasons) was the 28th Japanese Super Cup since its reestablishment, and the 36th overall. It was held on 20 February 2021 between the 2020 J1 League champions and Emperor's Cup winners Kawasaki Frontale and the league's (and cup) runners-up Gamba Osaka, the third league runners-up to ever qualify for the competition and the first club other than Urawa Red Diamonds to qualify in this way. It took place at the Saitama Stadium 2002, Saitama, Saitama. This was the first Super Cup held after the recognition by the Guinness World Records as Fuji Xerox sponsored the competition for a world record of 27 years, the longest sponsorship of a football super cup.

This was Frontale's third Super Cup appearance overall, all in the previous four years; they only failed to qualify in 2020 and won once in 2019. At the other hand, this was Gamba's seventh Super Cup appearance and their first since 2016, winning twice (in 2007 and 2015).

Frontale took a 2–0 lead from Kaoru Mitoma in the first half before being equalized in the second half. On the last minute of the second half additional time, substitute Yu Kobayashi scored the winner for the double winners and earned them their second Super Cup title. Gamba extended their trophy drought, its most recent title was the 2015 Emperor's Cup.

== Match details ==
20 February 2021
13:35 JST

Kawasaki Frontale	3–2	Gamba Osaka
Mitoma 29', 33'; Kobayashi 90+6'	Report	Yajima 60'; Patric 67' (pen.)

Saitama Stadium 2002, Saitama
Attendance: 4,208
Referee: Yusuke Araki

Kawasaki Frontale	Gamba Osaka

GK	1	(South Korea) Jung Sung-ryong
RB	13	(Japan) Miki Yamane
CB	4	(Brazil) Jesiel
CB	5	(Japan) Shogo Taniguchi (c)
LB	47	(Japan) Reo Hatate
DM	6	(Brazil) João Schmidt	(substituted off) 64'
CM	25	(Japan) Ao Tanaka
CM	8	(Japan) Yasuto Wakizaka	(substituted off) 64'
RF	41	(Japan) Akihiro Ienaga	(substituted off) 83'
CF	9	(Brazil) Leandro Damião	(substituted off) 72'
LF	18	(Japan) Kaoru Mitoma	(substituted off) 72'
Substitutes:
GK	27	(Japan) Kenta Tanno
DF	7	(Japan) Shintaro Kurumaya	(substituted on) 90+1'
MF	3	(Japan) Koki Tsukagawa	(substituted on) 64'	(substituted off) 90+1'
MF	16	(Japan) Tatsuya Hasegawa	(substituted on) 72'
MF	22	(Japan) Kento Tachibanada	(substituted on) 64'
FW	11	(Japan) Yu Kobayashi	(substituted on) 72'
FW	19	(Japan) Daiya Tono	(substituted on) 83'
Manager:
(Japan) Toru Oniki

GK	1	(Japan) Masaaki Higashiguchi
RB	8	(Japan) Kosuke Onose
CB	5	(Japan) Genta Miura (c)
CB	13	(Japan) Shunya Suganuma
LB	4	(Japan) Hiroki Fujiharu
DM	29	(Japan) Yuki Yamamoto
CM	15	(Japan) Yosuke Ideguchi
CM	10	(Japan) Shu Kurata	(substituted off) 90'
RF	21	(Japan) Shinya Yajima	(substituted off) 69'
CF	18	(Brazil) Patric	(substituted off) 81'
LF	34	(Japan) Shuhei Kawasaki	(substituted off) 69'
Substitutes:
GK	22	(Japan) Jun Ichimori
DF	3	(Japan) Gen Shoji
DF	27	(Japan) Ryu Takao	(substituted on) 90'
MF	6	(South Korea) Ju Se-jong
FW	9	(Brazil) Leandro Pereira	(substituted on) 69'
FW	20	(Japan) Kazunari Ichimi	(substituted on) 81'
FW	32	(Brazil) Tiago Alves	(substituted on) 69'
Head coach:
(Japan) Tsuneyasu Miyamoto

Assistant referees:
Yusuke Hamamoto
Kota Watanabe
Fourth official:
Futoshi Nakamura
Video assistant referee:
Hiroyuki Kimura
Assistant video assistant referee:
Osamu Nomura

Match rules

- 90 minutes.
- Penalty shoot-out if scores still level.
- Seven named substitutes.
- Maximum of five substitutions, and a maximum of two additional permanent concussion substitutions.
