= Miki Yamane =

Japanese footballer (born 1993)

Miki Yamane 山根 視来
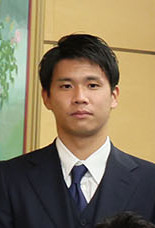
- Yamane in 2022

Personal information
- Full name: Miki Yamane
- Date of birth: 22 December 1993 (age 32)
- Place of birth: Aoba-ku, Yokohama, Kanagawa, Japan
- Height: 1.78 m (5 ft 10 in)
- Position: Right-back

Team information
- Current team: Urawa Red Diamonds
- Number: 6

Youth career
- 1999–2005: Azamino FC
- 2006–2008: Tokyo Verdy
- 2009–2011: Daiichi Gakuin High School

College career
Years	Team	Apps	(Gls)
2012–2015	Toin University of Yokohama		

Senior career*
Years	Team	Apps	(Gls)
2016–2019	Shonan Bellmare	100	(3)
2020–2024	Kawasaki Frontale	133	(11)
2024–2026	LA Galaxy	80	(1)
2026–	Urawa Red Diamonds	0	(0)

International career^{‡}
2021–2022	Japan	16	(2)
Medal record
Men's football
Representing Japan
EAFF Championship
Winner	2022 Japan	Team
- * Club domestic league appearances and goals as of 17 August 2026 ‡ National team caps and goals as of 27 November 2022

Miki Yamane (山根 視来, Yamane Miki; born 22 December 1993) is a Japanese professional footballer who plays as a right-back for J1 League club Urawa Red Diamonds.

== Club career ==
Yamane joined J1 League club Shonan Bellmare in 2016. On 20 April, he debuted in J.League Cup (v Júbilo Iwata).

In 2020, he moved to J1 League club, Kawasaki Frontale.

On 5 January 2024, Yamane joined Major League Soccer side LA Galaxy on a three-year contract.

== International career ==
Yamane made his debut for the Japan national team on 25 March 2021 in a friendly against South Korea. He scored the opening goal in the 16th minute as Japan won 3–0. He was part of the Japan 26-man squad for the 2022 FIFA World Cup in Qatar.

== Career statistics ==
=== Club ===
As of match played 13 September 2025

Appearances and goals by club, season and competition
Club	Season	League			National cup (Note: Includes Emperor's Cup.)		League cup (Note: Includes J.League Cup.)		Continental		Other		Total	
Club	Season	Division	Apps	Goals	Apps	Goals	Apps	Goals	Apps	Goals	Apps	Goals	Apps	Goals
Shonan Bellmare	2016	J1 League	–		2	0	2	0	–		–		4	0
Shonan Bellmare	2017	J2 League	37	0	2	0	–		–		–		39	0
Shonan Bellmare	2018	J1 League	32	1	–		8	0	–		–		40	1
Shonan Bellmare	2019	J1 League	31	2	–		3	0	–		1 (Note: J1/J2 Play-offs)	0	35	2
Shonan Bellmare	Total		100	3	4	0	13	0	0	0	1	0	118	3
Kawasaki Frontale	2020	J1 League	31	4	2	0	5	0	–		–		38	4
Kawasaki Frontale	2021	J1 League	37	2	4	0	–		6	0	1 (Note: Japanese Super Cup)	0	48	2
Kawasaki Frontale	2022	J1 League	32	3	0	0	1	0	4	0	1	0	38	3
Kawasaki Frontale	2023	J1 League	33	2	5	0	4	0	0	0	0	0	42	2
Kawasaki Frontale	Total		133	11	11	0	10	0	10	0	2	0	166	11
LA Galaxy	2024	Major League Soccer	38	0	0	0	3 (Note: Leagues Cup)	0	–		6 (Note: MLS Cup)	0	43	0
LA Galaxy	2025	Major League Soccer	26	1	0	0	5	0	2 (Note: CONCACAF Champions Cup)	0	0	0	33	1
Career total			297	15	14	0	31	0	10	0	6	0	360	15

=== International ===
As of match played 17 September 2022

Appearances and goals by national team and year
National team	Year	Apps	Goals
Japan	2021	6	1
Japan	2022	9	1
Total		15	2

Scores and results list Japan's goal tally first, score column indicates score after each Yamane goal.

List of international goals scored by Miki Yamane
No.	Date	Venue	Opponent	Score	Result	Competition
1	25 March 2021	Nissan Stadium, Yokohama, Japan	South Korea	1–0	3–0	Friendly
2	10 June 2022	Noevir Stadium Kobe, Kobe, Japan	Ghana	1–0	4–1	2022 Kirin Cup

== Honours ==
Shonan Bellmare

- J2 League: 2017
- J.League Cup: 2018

Kawasaki Frontale

- J1 League: 2020, 2021
- Emperor's Cup: 2020, 2023
- Japanese Super Cup: 2021

LA Galaxy

- MLS Cup: 2024

Japan

- EAFF E-1 Football Championship: 2022

Individual

- J.League Best XI: 2020, 2021, 2022
