= Koki Tsukagawa =

Japanese footballer

Koki Tsukagawa 塚川孝輝
Personal information
- Full name: Koki Tsukagawa
- Date of birth: July 16, 1994 (age 32)
- Place of birth: Hiroshima, Japan
- Height: 1.84 m (6 ft 1/2 in)
- Position: Midfielder

Team information
- Current team: Suwon FC
- Number: 18

Youth career
- Niho SC
- –2009: Sanfrecce Hiroshima
- 2010–2012: Hiroshima Kanon High School

College career
Years	Team	Apps	(Gls)
2013–2016	Ryutsu Keizai University		

Senior career*
Years	Team	Apps	(Gls)
2017–2018	Fagiano Okayama	66	(5)
2019–2020	Matsumoto Yamaga	32	(9)
2019	→ FC Gifu (loan)	19	(1)
2021–2022	Kawasaki Frontale	23	(0)
2022–2025	FC Tokyo	34	(3)
2024	→ Kyoto Sanga FC (loan)	3	(0)
2025	→ Mito HollyHock (loan)	14	(0)
2026	PT Prachuap	14	(0)
2026–	Suwon FC	2	(0)
- * Club domestic league appearances and goals as of 5 August 2026

Koki Tsukagawa (塚川 孝輝, Tsukagawa Kōki; born July 16, 1994) is a Japanese professional footballer who plays as a midfielder for K League 2 club Suwon FC.

== Career ==
Koki Tsukagawa joined J2 League club Fagiano Okayama in 2017.

== Club statistics ==
Updated to 22 July 2022.

Club performance			League		Cup		League Cup		Continental		Other		Total	
Season	Club	League	Apps	Goals	Apps	Goals	Apps	Goals	Apps	Goals	Apps	Goals	Apps	Goals
Japan			League		Emperor's Cup		J.League Cup		AFC				Total	
2017	Fagiano Okayama	J2 League	34	2	1	0	–		–		–		35	2
2018	Fagiano Okayama	J2 League	32	3	0	0	–		–		–		32	3
2019	FC Gifu	J2 League	19	1	0	0	–		–		–		19	1
2019	Matsumoto Yamaga	J1 League	3	0	1	0	6	0	–		–		10	0
2020	Matsumoto Yamaga	J2 League	29	9	–		1	0	–		–		30	9
2021	Kawasaki Frontale	J1 League	14	0	2	0	0	0	4	0	1 (Note: Appearances in the Japanese Super Cup)	0	21	0
2022	Kawasaki Frontale	J1 League	9	0	0	0	0	0	3	0	1 (Note: Appearances in the Japanese Super Cup)	0	13	0
Total			140	15	2	0	7	0	7	0	2	0	158	15

== Honours ==
=== Club ===
- J1 League: 2021
- Japanese Super Cup: 2021
