= Hiroto Taniguchi =

Japanese footballer

Hiroto Taniguchi 谷口 栄斗
Personal information
- Date of birth: 30 September 1999 (age 27)
- Place of birth: Atsugi, Kanagawa, Japan
- Height: 1.81 m (5 ft 11 in)
- Position: Centre back

Team information
- Current team: Kawasaki Frontale
- Number: 3

Youth career
- Ogino SSS
- –2017: Tokyo Verdy

College career
Years	Team	Apps	(Gls)
2018–2021	Kokushikan University		

Senior career*
Years	Team	Apps	(Gls)
2021–2025	Tokyo Verdy	118	(10)
2026–	Kawasaki Frontale	6	(0)

International career
2017	Japan U18		
2018	Japan U19	1	(0)
- * Club domestic league appearances and goals as of 1 August 2026

Hiroto Taniguchi (谷口 栄斗, Taniguchi Hiroto; born 30 September 1999) is a Japanese professional footballer who plays as a centre back and currently play for J1 League club, Kawasaki Frontale.

== Career ==
Taniguchi start first professional contract with Tokyo Verdy in 2022 season. Taniguchi was brought his club secure promotion to J1 League from 2024 season after draw at Shimizu S-Pulse 1-1 in J1 Promotion Play-offs Final.

== Career statistics ==
=== Club ===
As of the match played 1 August 2026.

Club	Season	League			National Cup		League Cup		Other		Total			
Club	Season	Division	Apps	Goals	Apps	Goals	Apps	Goals	Apps	Goals	Apps	Goals		
Tokyo Verdy	2022	J2 League	34	1	4	1	–				38	2		
Tokyo Verdy	2023	J2 League	20	1	1	0	–		2 (Note: Includes J1 Play-offs)	0	23	1		
Tokyo Verdy	2024	J1 League	29	5	1	0	0	0	–		30	5		
Tokyo Verdy	2025	J1 League	35	3	2	0	5	0	0	0	1	0		
Tokyo Verdy	Total		118	3	8	1	5	0	2	0	133	11		
Kawasaki Frontale	2026	J1 League	6	0	0	0	0	0	–				6	0
Career total			124	10	8	1	5	0	2	0	139	11		

== Honours ==
Tokyo Verdy

- J2 League Promotion Play-off Winner: 2023
