= Yusuke Araki =

Japanese football referee (born 1986)

Yusuke Araki 荒木 友輔
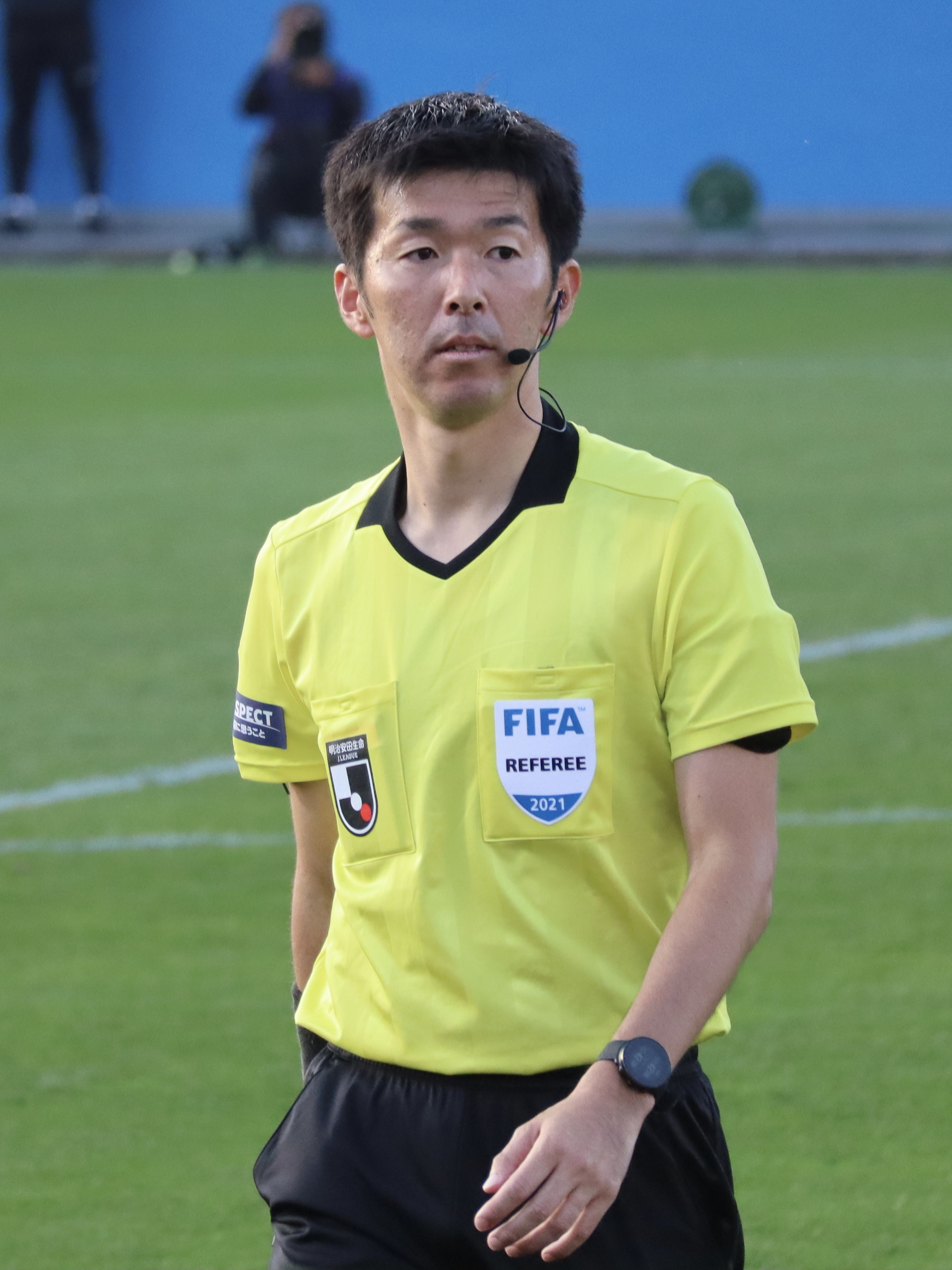
- Araki in November 2021
- Born: 2 May 1986 (age 40); Ōme, Tokyo, Japan

Domestic
Years	League	Role
2016–present	J1 League	Referee

International
Years	League	Role
2017–present	FIFA listed	Referee

Yusuke Araki (Japanese: 荒木 友輔, Hepburn: Araki Yūsuke; born 2 May 1986) is a Japanese football referee who has been listed on the FIFA International Referees List since 2017.

== Career ==
Born in May 1986 in Ōme, Tokyo, Araki began his refereeing career in the lower divisions of Japanese leagues, ascending to the top-tier J1 League in 2016. One year later, he was named a FIFA-listed international referee. Araki's most prominent refereeing roles in Japanese football include two Japanese Super Cups, including the 2021 and the 2023 editions. In December 2025, he was named as Referee of the Year by the Japan Football Association.

In the international stage, Araki has overseen matches at different competitions, including youth tournaments like the 2018 AFC U-16 Championship in Malaysia, the 2022 AFC U-23 Asian Cup in Uzbekistan, and the 2023 FIFA U-20 World Cup in Argentina. Other tournaments include the Men's football competition at the 2019 Summer Universiade in Italy, the 2023 AFC Asian Cup in Qatar, and the 2025–26 AFC Champions League Elite.

Araki refereed qualification matches for the 2026 FIFA World Cup and was chosen as Japan's representative for the tournament to be held in Mexico, the United States, and Canada. His assistant referee will be fellow Japanese official Jun Mihara.

In 2018, Araki signed a contract as a professional referee.

== Outside refereeing ==
Araki played football during his school years between 1993 and 2005. He graduated in 2010 from the Faculty of Letters of the Hosei University.
