= Kenta Tanno =

Japanese footballer

Kenta Tanno 丹野 研太
Personal information
- Full name: Kenta Tanno
- Date of birth: August 30, 1986 (age 40)
- Place of birth: Sendai, Miyagi, Japan
- Height: 1.86 m (6 ft 1 in)
- Position: Goalkeeper

Team information
- Current team: Tochigi SC
- Number: 27

Youth career
- 1999–2004: FC Miyagi Barcelona

Senior career*
Years	Team	Apps	(Gls)
2005–2019	Cerezo Osaka	27	(0)
2007	→ V-Varen Nagasaki (loan)	1	(0)
2011–2013	→ Oita Trinita (loan)	35	(0)
2016–2019	→ Cerezo Osaka U-23 (loan)	15	(0)
2020–2022	Kawasaki Frontale	9	(0)
2023	Iwate Grulla Morioka	38	(0)
2024-	Tochigi SC	37	(0)
Medal record
Cerezo Osaka
Winner	J.League Cup	2017
Winner	Emperor's Cup	2017
- * Club domestic league appearances and goals as of 1 January 2026

Kenta Tanno (丹野 研太, Tanno Kenta; born August 30, 1986 in Miyagi) is a Japanese professional footballer who plays as a goalkeeper for Japan Football League club Tochigi SC.

== Club career statistics ==
As of start of the 2023 season.

Club performance			League		National Cup		League Cup		Other		Total	
Season	Club	League	Apps	Goals	Apps	Goals	Apps	Goals	Apps	Goals	Apps	Goals
Japan			League		Emperor's Cup		J. League Cup		Other		Total	
2005	Cerezo Osaka	J1 League	0	0	0	0	0	0	-		0	0
2006	Cerezo Osaka	J1 League	0	0	0	0	0	0	-		0	0
2007	Cerezo Osaka	J2 League	0	0	0	0	-		-		0	0
2007	V-Varen Nagasaki	JRL (Kyushu)	1	0	3	0	-		-		4	0
2008	Cerezo Osaka	J2 League	0	0	0	0	-		-		0	0
2009	Cerezo Osaka	J2 League	1	0	0	0	-		-		1	0
2010	Cerezo Osaka	J1 League	0	0	0	0	0	0	-		0	0
2011	Oita Trinita	J2 League	6	0	1	0	-		-		7	0
2012	Oita Trinita	J2 League	4	0	1	0	-		-		5	0
2013	Oita Trinita	J1 League	25	0	0	0	4	0	-		29	0
2014	Cerezo Osaka	J1 League	0	0	0	0	0	0	-		0	0
2015	Cerezo Osaka	J2 League	19	0	0	0	-		-		19	0
2016	Cerezo Osaka	J2 League	4	0	2	0	-		-		6	0
2017	Cerezo Osaka	J1 League	3	0	4	0	8	0	-		15	0
2018	Cerezo Osaka	J1 League	0	0	2	0	2	0	3 (Note: Appearances in the AFC Champions League) (Note: Appearance in the J.League Cup / Copa Sudamericana Championship)	0	7	0
2019	Cerezo Osaka	J1 League	0	0	0	0	1	0	-		1	0
2020	Kawasaki Frontale	J1 League	0	0	0	0	1	0	-		1	0
2021	Kawasaki Frontale	J1 League	5	0	0	0	0	0	1	0	6	0
2022	Kawasaki Frontale	J1 League	4	0	1	0	0	0	-		5	0
2023	Iwate Grulla Morioka	J3 League	0	0	0	0	-		-		0	0
Total			72	0	14	0	16	0	4	0	106	0

== Reserves performance ==
As of end of the 2019 season

Club performance			League		Total	
Season	Club	League	Apps	Goals	Apps	Goals
Japan			League		Total	
2016	Cerezo Osaka U-23	J3	7	0	7	0
2018	Cerezo Osaka U-23	J3	1	0	1	0
2019	Cerezo Osaka U-23	J3	7	0	7	0
Career total			15	0	15	0

== Honours ==
=== Club ===
- J1 League: 2021
- Emperor's Cup: 2020
- Japanese Super Cup: 2021
