= Jesiel =

Brazilian footballer

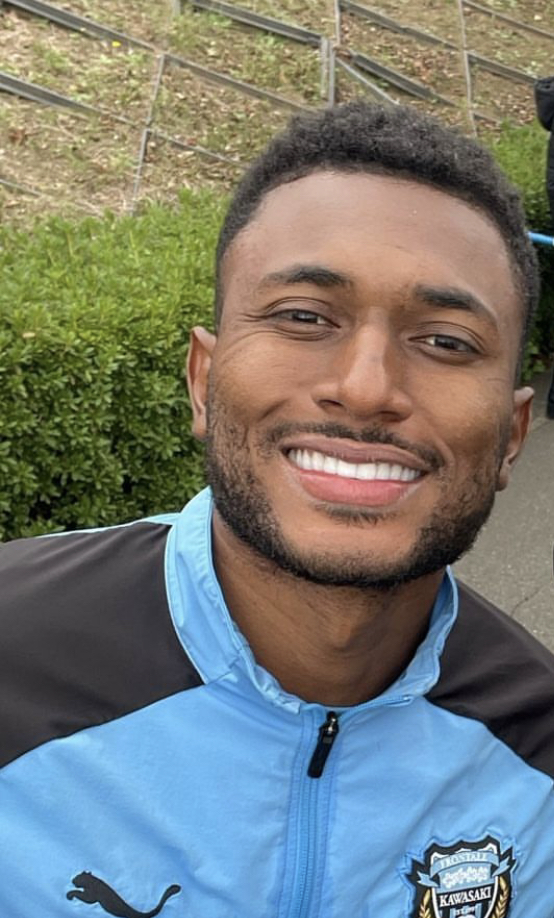
- Jesiel in 2023.

Personal information
- Full name: Jesiel Cardoso Miranda
- Date of birth: 5 March 1994 (age 32)
- Place of birth: São Paulo, Brazil
- Height: 1.86 m (6 ft 1 in)
- Position: Centre back

Team information
- Current team: Maringá

Youth career
- Red Bull Brasil
- 2012–2015: Atlético Mineiro

Senior career*
Years	Team	Apps	(Gls)
2015–2019	Atlético Mineiro	3	(0)
2016	→ Bragantino (loan)	5	(0)
2018	→ Mirassol (loan)	10	(1)
2018	→ Paraná (loan)	18	(0)
2019	→ Kawasaki Frontale (loan)	15	(0)
2020–2025	Kawasaki Frontale	109	(6)
2026–	Maringá	1	(0)
- * Club domestic league appearances and goals as of 6 December 2025

Jesiel Cardoso Miranda (born 3 May 1994), simply known as Jesiel, is a Brazilian professional footballer who plays for Maringá as a centre back.

== Club career ==
Born in São Paulo, Jesiel started his youth career with the academy of Red Bull Brasil and moved to Atlético Mineiro in 2012. Ahead of the 2015 season, he was promoted to the senior team. However, he failed to make any appearance during the campaign.

On 7 February 2016, Jesiel made his first team debut, starting in a 2–1 defeat against Figueirense, in Primeira Liga. To get more playing time and first team experience, he joined Série B side Bragantino on loan on 16 February. However, he returned to his parent club in June.

In April 2017, Jesiel injured his left thigh during a defeat against Caldense, in Campeonato Mineiro. On 26 June, his contract was extended until 2020.

On 28 December 2017, Jesiel joined Mirassol on a loan deal for the upcoming Campeonato Paulista. On 4 April 2018, he was loaned out to Paraná. He got injured in August and returned to play in the following month.

On 31 December 2018, Jesiel moved to Japanese J1 League side Kawasaki Frontale ahead of the 2019 season, joining on loan until 1 January 2020. His loan became permanent as he joined Kawasaki Frontale in a full transfer. He is a Kawasaki Frontale regular ever since then, having even featured at two J.League Best XI awards, on 2020 and 2021.

For 2023 season, along with the appointment of Kento Tachibanada as the new club captain of Frontale, Jesiel became one of three players selected as the vice-captains alongside Kyohei Noborizato and Yasuto Wakizaka.

== Career statistics ==
As of match played 6 December 2025

Appearances and goals by club, season and competition
Club	Season	League			State League		Cup		League Cup		Continental		Other		Total	
Club	Season	Division	Apps	Goals	Apps	Goals	Apps	Goals	Apps	Goals	Apps	Goals	Apps	Goals	Apps	Goals
Atlético Mineiro	2016	Série A	2	0	—		—		—		—		1 (Note: Appearance in Primeira Liga)	0	3	0
Atlético Mineiro	2017	Série A	1	0	1	0	—		—		—		1	0	3	0
Atlético Mineiro	Total		3	0	1	0	—		—		—		2	0	6	0
Bragantino (loan)	2016	Série B	5	0	8	0	—		—		—		—		13	0
Mirassol (loan)	2018	Paulista A1	—		10	1	—		—		—		—		10	1
Paraná (loan)	2018	Série A	18	0	—		—		—		—		—		18	0
Kawasaki Frontale (loan)	2019	J1 League	15	0	—		1 (Note: Emperor's Cup)	0	—		—		—		16	0
Kawasaki Frontale	2020	J1 League	29	3	—		2	0	5 (Note: J.League Cup)	0	—		—		36	3
Kawasaki Frontale	2021	J1 League	33	2	—		3	0	2	0	4 (Note: AFC Champions League)	0	1 (Note: Japanese Super Cup)	0	43	2
Kawasaki Frontale	2022	J1 League	12	1	—		0	0	2	0	0	0	0	0	14	1
Kawasaki Frontale	2023	J1 League	5	0	—		1	0	0	0	3	0	—		9	0
Kawasaki Frontale	2024	J1 League	18	0	—		0	0	0	0	5	1	0	0	23	1
Kawasaki Frontale	2025	J1 League	12	0	—		1	0	1	0	0	0	—		14	0
Kawasaki Frontale	Total		124	6	—		8	0	10	0	12	1	1	0	155	7
Career total			150	6	19	1	8	0	10	0	12	1	3	0	202	8

== Honours ==
=== Club ===
Kawasaki Frontale

- J1 League: 2020, 2021
- Emperor's Cup: 2020, 2023
- Japanese Super Cup: 2021

=== Individual ===
- J.League Best XI: 2020, 2021
