= Renji Matsui =

Japanese footballer

Personal information
- Date of birth: 27 February 2000 (age 26)
- Place of birth: Iwaki, Fukushima, Japan
- Height: 1.78 m (5 ft 10 in)
- Position: Defensive midfielder

Team information
- Current team: Vegalta Sendai
- Number: 6

Youth career
- Altero FC Iwaki
- Liberdade Iwaki
- 2015–2017: Yaita Chuo High School

College career
Years	Team	Apps	(Gls)
2018–2021	Hosei University		

Senior career*
Years	Team	Apps	(Gls)
2021–2024	Kawasaki Frontale	0	(0)
2023	FC Machida Zelvia (loan)	17	(1)
2024	Vegalta Sendai (loan)	31	(1)
2025–	Vegalta Sendai	43	(0)

International career^{‡}
2016	Japan U16		
2017	Japan U17	2	(0)
2021–	Japan U23	1	(0)
- * Club domestic league appearances and goals as of 17 August 2026 ‡ National team caps and goals as of 17:04, 18 April 2022 (UTC)

Renji Matsui (松井 蓮之, Matsui Renji; born 27 February 2000) is a Japanese footballer currently playing as a defensive midfielder for Vegalta Sendai.

== Club career ==
In 2021, while studying at the Hosei University, Matsui was approved to be a designated special player for Kawasaki Frontale for the rest of the season, having agreed to join the club in 2022, when he graduated.

== Personal life ==
Renji is the brother of Japanese model and actress Airi Matsui.

== Career statistics ==
=== Club ===
As of 21 October 2022:

Club	Season	League			National Cup		League Cup		Continental		Other		Total	
Club	Season	Division	Apps	Goals	Apps	Goals	Apps	Goals	Apps	Goals	Apps	Goals	Apps	Goals
Kawasaki Frontale	2021	J1 League	0	0	0	0	0	0	0	0	0	0	0	0
Kawasaki Frontale	2022	J1 League	0	0	2 (Note: Appearances in the Emperor's Cup)	0	0	0	2 (Note: Appearances in the AFC Champions League)	0	0	0	4	0
Career total			0	0	2	0	0	0	2	0	0	0	4	0

== Honours ==
=== Club ===
Kawasaki Frontale

- Japanese Super Cup: 2024
