= Shuto Tanabe =

Japanese footballer (born 2002)

Shuto Tanabe 田邉 秀斗
Personal information
- Full name: Shuto Tanabe
- Date of birth: 5 May 2002 (age 24)
- Place of birth: Sōraku, Kyoto, Japan
- Height: 1.80 m (5 ft 11 in)
- Position: Right-back

Team information
- Current team: Tokyo Verdy
- Number: 35

Youth career
- Yamadasho SC
- –2017: Nara YMCA
- 2018–2020: Shizuoka Gakuen High School

Senior career*
Years	Team	Apps	(Gls)
2021–2025	Kawasaki Frontale	18	(0)
2022–2023	→ JEF United Chiba (loan)	17	(0)
2026–	Tokyo Verdy	6	(0)

International career^{‡}
2018	Japan U18		
- * Club domestic league appearances and goals as of 8 August 2026 ‡ National team caps and goals as of 17:04, 5 September 2021 (UTC)

Shuto Tanabe (田邉 秀斗, Tanabe Shuto; born 5 May 2002) is a Japanese footballer who plays as a right-back for J1 League club Tokyo Verdy.

== Career statistics ==
=== Club ===
As of 22 April 2026.

Appearances and goals by club, season and competition
Club	Season	League			National cup (Note: Includes Emperors Cup)		League cup (Note: Includes J.League Cup)		Continental		Other		Total	
Club	Season	Division	Apps	Goals	Apps	Goals	Apps	Goals	Apps	Goals	Apps	Goals	Apps	Goals
Kawasaki Frontale	2021	J1 League	0	0	0	0	2	0	1 (Note: Appearances in AFC Champions League Elite)	0	0	0	3	0
Kawasaki Frontale	2022	J1 League	0	0	1	0	0	0	1	0	0	0	2	0
Kawasaki Frontale	2023	J1 League	5	0	0	0	1	0	1	0	0	0	7	0
Kawasaki Frontale	2024	J1 League	4	0	2	0	0	0	1	0	1 (Note: Appearance in Japanese Super Cup)	0	8	0
Kawasaki Frontale	2025	J1 League	9	0	1	0	3	0	1	0	0	0	14	0
Kawasaki Frontale	Total		18	0	4	0	6	0	5	0	1	0	34	0
JEF United Chiba (loan)	2022	J2 League	15	0	–		–		–		–		15	0
JEF United Chiba (loan)	2023	J2 League	2	0	–		–		–		–		2	0
JEF United Chiba (loan)	Total		17	0	0	0	0	0	0	0	0	0	17	0
Tokyo Verdy	2026	J1 (100)	2	0	–		–		–		–		2	0
Career total			37	0	4	0	6	0	5	0	1	0	53	0

== Honours ==
=== Club ===
Kawasaki Frontale

- Japanese Super Cup: 2024
