= Shintaro Kurumaya =

Japanese footballer

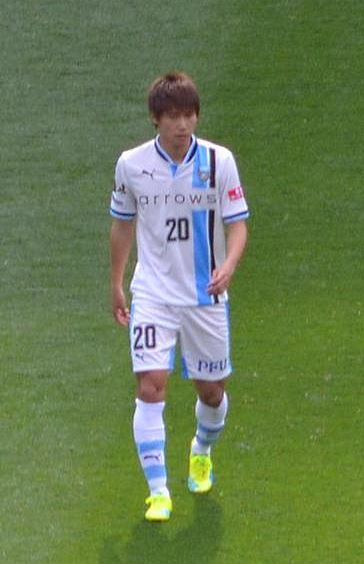
- Kurumaya playing for Kawasaki Frontale in April 2016

Personal information
- Full name: Shintaro Kurumaya
- Date of birth: 5 April 1992 (age 34)
- Place of birth: Kumamoto, Kumamoto, Japan
- Height: 1.78 m (5 ft 10 in)
- Position: Left back

Youth career
- Taiken SC Kumamoto
- Taiyo SC Kumamoto
- Kumamoto United SC
- Nagamiwa Junior High School
- 2008–2010: Ohzu High School

College career
Years	Team	Apps	(Gls)
2011–2014	University of Tsukuba		

Senior career*
Years	Team	Apps	(Gls)
2014–2025	Kawasaki Frontale	251	(5)

International career
2017–2018	Japan	4	(0)
Medal record
Kawasaki Frontale
Winner	J1 League	2017
Winner	J1 League	2018
Runner-up	J.League Cup	2017
Runner-up	Emperor's Cup	2016
- * Club domestic league appearances and goals as of 11 December 2025

Shintaro Kurumaya (車屋 紳太郎, Kurumaya Shintarō; born 5 April 1992) is a Japanese footballer who plays as a left back for Kawasaki Frontale.

== International career ==
On 7 May 2015, Japan's coach Vahid Halilhodžić called him up for a two-day training camp.

== Club statistics ==
Last update: 9 April 2023.

Club performance			League		Cup		League Cup		Continental		Other		Total	
Season	Club	League	Apps	Goals	Apps	Goals	Apps	Goals	Apps	Goals	Apps	Goals	Apps	Goals
Japan			League		Emperor's Cup		League Cup		AFC		Other^{1}		Total	
2014	Kawasaki Frontale	J1 League	2	0	0	0	0	0	–		–		2	0
2015	Kawasaki Frontale	J1 League	30	0	1	0	5	0	–		–		36	0
2016	Kawasaki Frontale	J1 League	30	1	5	1	5	0	–		1	0	41	2
2017	Kawasaki Frontale	J1 League	34	0	3	0	3	0	10	0	–		50	0
2018	Kawasaki Frontale	J1 League	31	0	2	0	0	0	4	0	1	0	38	0
2019	Kawasaki Frontale	J1 League	27	0	3	1	5	0	3	0	1	0	39	1
2020	Kawasaki Frontale	J1 League	22	1	2	0	3	0	–		–		27	1
2021	Kawasaki Frontale	J1 League	31	1	4	0	1	0	6	0	1	0	43	1
2022	Kawasaki Frontale	J1 League	19	1	2	1	1	0	5	3	1	0	28	4
2023	Kawasaki Frontale	J1 League	2	0	0	0	2	1	0	0	0	0	4	1
Career total			228	4	20	3	25	4	23	0	4	0	308	10

^{1}Includes J. League Championship and Japanese Super Cup.

== National team statistics ==
Japan national team
Year	Apps	Goals
2017	3	0
2018	1	0
Total	4	0

== Honours ==
=== Club ===
- J1 League (4) : 2017, 2018, 2020, 2021
- Emperor's Cup (1) : 2020
- J.League Cup (1) : 2019
- Japanese Super Cup (2) : 2019, 2021

=== Individual ===
- J.League Best XI (2) : 2017, 2018
