= Asahi Sasaki =

Japanese footballer

Personal information
- Date of birth: 26 January 2000 (age 26)
- Place of birth: Kawagoe, Saitama, Japan
- Height: 1.80 m (5 ft 11 in)
- Position: Left back

Team information
- Current team: Kawasaki Frontale
- Number: 5

Youth career
- 2006–2011: FC Giocare
- 2012–2014: EC Jogador
- 2015–2017: Saitama Heisei High School

College career
Years	Team	Apps	(Gls)
2018–2021	Ryutsu Keizai University		

Senior career*
Years	Team	Apps	(Gls)
2018	Ryutsu Keizai University FC	1	(0)
2022–	Kawasaki Frontale	117	(6)
- * Club domestic league appearances and goals as of 1 August 2026

Asahi Sasaki (佐々木 旭, Sasaki Asahi; born 26 January 2000) is a Japanese footballer currently playing as a left back for Kawasaki Frontale.

== Career statistics ==
=== Club ===
As of 24 September 2023.

Appearances and goals by club, season and competition
Club	Season	League			National Cup		League Cup		Continental		Other		Total	
Club	Season	Division	Apps	Goals	Apps	Goals	Apps	Goals	Apps	Goals	Apps	Goals	Apps	Goals
Ryutsu Keizai University FC	2018	Kantō Soccer League	1	0	0	0	–		–		1 (Note: Appearances in the Shakaijin Cup)	0	2	0
Ryutsu Keizai University	2019	–			1 (Note: Appearances in the Emperor's Cup)	0	–		–		–		1	0
Ryutsu Keizai University	2021	–			1	0	–		–		–		1	0
Ryutsu Keizai University	Total		0	0	2	0	0	0	0	0	0	0	2	0
Kawasaki Frontale	2022	J1 League	21	1	2	0	0	0	4	0	0	0	27	1
Kawasaki Frontale	2023	J1 League	15	1	3	1	5	0	1	0	–		24	2
Kawasaki Frontale	Total		36	2	5	1	5	0	5	0	0	0	51	3
Career total			37	2	7	1	5	0	5	0	1	0	55	3
