= Taiyo Igarashi =

Japanese footballer

Taiyo Igarashi 五十嵐 太陽
Personal information
- Full name: Taiyo Igarashi
- Date of birth: 14 April 2003 (age 23)
- Place of birth: Sagamihara, Kanagawa, Japan
- Height: 1.72 m (5 ft 8 in)
- Positions: Forward; winger

Team information
- Current team: Tochigi SC
- Number: 10

Youth career
- Soto United SC
- SCH FC
- –2022: Kawasaki Frontale

Senior career*
Years	Team	Apps	(Gls)
2022–2026	Kawasaki Frontale	0	(0)
2023–2024	→ Renofa Yamaguchi FC (loan)	43	(4)
2025–	→ Tochigi SC (loan)	37	(10)
2026–	Tochigi SC	4	(0)
- * Club domestic league appearances and goals as of 17 August 2026

Taiyo Igarashi (五十嵐 太陽, Igarashi Taiyo; born 14 April 2003) is a Japanese footballer who plays as a forward or a winger for Tochigi SC.

== Club career ==
Takai was promoted to the Kawasaki Frontale first team ahead of the 2022 season. He made his debut in a resounding 8–0 win over Guangzhou.

In December 2022, it was announced that Igarashi would be joining J2 League club Renofa Yamaguchi FC on a season-long loan for the 2023 season.

== Career statistics ==
=== Club ===
As of start of the 2023 season:

Appearances and goals by club, season and competition
Club	Season	League			Emperor's Cup		J. League Cup		AFC		Other		Total	
Club	Season	Division	Apps	Goals	Apps	Goals	Apps	Goals	Apps	Goals	Apps	Goals	Apps	Goals
Kawasaki Frontale	2022	J1 League	0	0	0	0	0	0	1 (Note: Appearances in the AFC Champions League)	0	–		1	0
Renofa Yamaguchi FC	2023	J2 League	0	0	0	0	–		–		–		0	0
Career total			0	0	0	0	0	0	1	0	0	0	1	0
