= Marcinho (footballer, born May 1995) =

Brazilian footballer

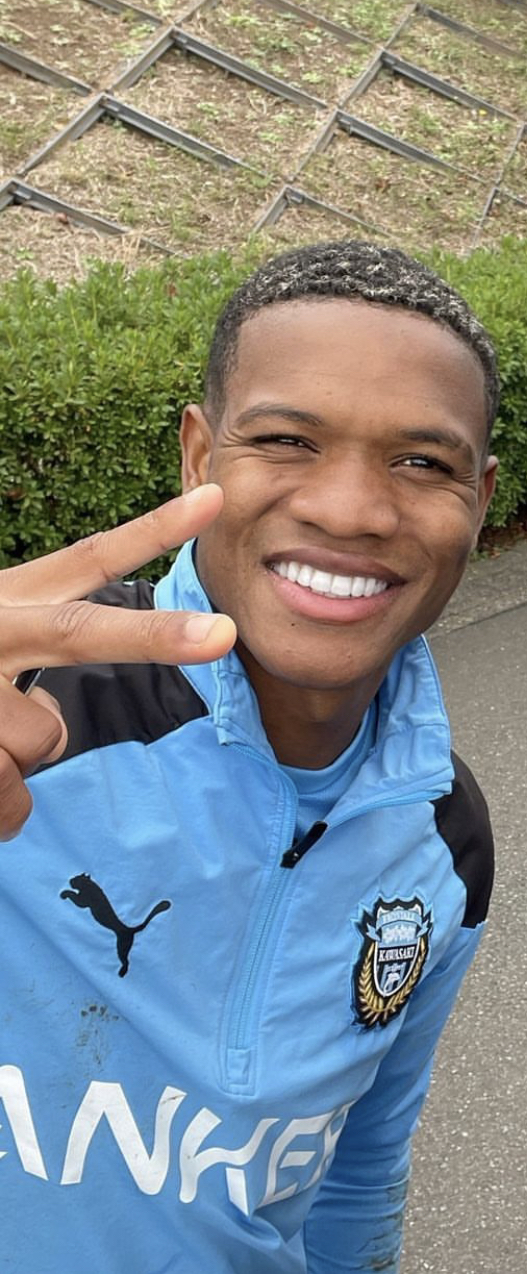
- Marcinho in 2023

Personal information
- Full name: Márcio Augusto da Silva Barbosa
- Date of birth: 16 May 1995 (age 31)
- Place of birth: Belford Roxo, Brazil
- Height: 1.73 m (5 ft 8 in)
- Position: Winger

Team information
- Current team: Kawasaki Frontale
- Number: 23

Youth career
- Coritiba
- 2015: Internacional

Senior career*
Years	Team	Apps	(Gls)
2015	Novo Hamburgo	14	(3)
2015–2019	Internacional	0	(0)
2016	→ Ypiranga-RS (loan)	3	(0)
2017	→ Brasil de Pelotas (loan)	32	(5)
2018–2019	→ Fortaleza (loan)	48	(7)
2019–2020	Chongqing Dangdai Lifan	26	(1)
2021–	Kawasaki Frontale	154	(30)
- * Club domestic league appearances and goals as of 1 August 2026

Márcio Augusto da Silva Barbosa (born 16 May 1995), commonly known as Marcinho, is a Brazilian professional footballer who plays as a winger for Kawasaki Frontale.

== Career ==
=== Early career ===
Born in Belford Roxo, Rio de Janeiro, Marcinho represented Coritiba's youth setup before being spotted by scouts of Novo Hamburgo in 2015. He made his senior debut for the latter on 1 February 2015, coming on as a second-half substitute in a 2–2 Campeonato Gaúcho home draw against Aimoré.

Marcinho scored his first senior goal on 4 February 2015, netting a last-minute winner in a 2–1 away defeat of Juventude. He finished the tournament with three goals in 14 appearances.

=== Internacional ===
==== Loans to Ypiranga and Brasil de Pelotas ====
In the middle of 2015, Marcinho joined Internacional and was assigned to the under-20 squad. On 30 August 2016, he was loaned to Ypiranga-RS until the end of the year's Série C.

On 19 January 2017, Marcinho was loaned to Série B side Brasil de Pelotas for one year. A regular starter, he contributed with five league goals in 32 appearances.

==== 2018 season ====
On 22 December 2017, Marcinho renewed his contract until 2020 and returned to his parent club for the ensuing campaign. He made his first team debut for the club the following 21 January, starting in a 3–0 away defeat of former side Novo Hamburgo.

After the arrivals of Jonathan Álvez and Paolo Guerrero, Marcinho, who was already a backup option, was not utilized by manager Odair Hellmann.

==== Loan to Fortaleza ====
On 22 May 2018, Marcinho was loaned to Fortaleza in the second division, until the end of the campaign. He contributed with three goals in 25 appearances as his side returned to the top tier after a 13-year absence, and announced his departure from the club on 2 January 2019.

On 7 February 2019, however, Marcinho rejoined the club on loan until the end of the year.

On 13 August 2021, Kawasaki Frontale announced the signing of Marcinho.

== Career statistics ==
As of match played 6 December 2025

Appearances and goals by club, season and competition
Club	Season	League			State League		National cup		League cup		Continental		Other		Total	
Club	Season	Division	Apps	Goals	Apps	Goals	Apps	Goals	Apps	Goals	Apps	Goals	Apps	Goals	Apps	Goals
Novo Hamburgo	2015	Gaúcho	—		14	3	—		—		—		—		14	3
Internacional	2015	Série A	0	0	0	0	0	0	—		—		3 (Note: Appearance(s) in Copa FGF)	0	3	0
Internacional	2018	Série A	0	0	8	0	3	0	—		—		—		11	0
Internacional	Total		0	0	8	0	3	0	—		—		3	0	14	0
Ypiranga-RS (loan)	2016	Série C	3	0	—		—		—		—		—		3	0
Brasil de Pelotas (loan)	2017	Série B	32	5	10	2	—		—		—		2 (Note: Appearance(s) in Primeira Liga)	0	44	7
Fortaleza (loan)	2018	Série B	25	3	—		—		—		—		—		25	3
Fortaleza (loan)	2019	Série A	8	2	6	1	0	0	—		—		7 (Note: Appearance(s) in Copa do Nordeste)	1	21	4
Fortaleza (loan)	Total		33	5	6	1	0	0	—		—		7	1	49	7
Chongqing Dangdai Lifan	2019	Chinese Super League	10	0	—		0	0	—		—		—		10	0
Chongqing Dangdai Lifan	2020	Chinese Super League	16	1	—		1	1	—		—		—		17	2
Chongqing Dangdai Lifan	Total		26	1	—		1	1	—		—		—		27	2
Kawasaki Frontale	2021	J1 League	11	1	—		2	0	0	0	0	0	—		13	1
Kawasaki Frontale	2022	J1 League	30	12	—		2	0	2	2	5	1	1 (Note: Appearance(s) in Japanese Super Cup)	0	40	15
Kawasaki Frontale	2023	J1 League	20	1	—		2	1	2	0	5	3	—		29	5
Kawasaki Frontale	2024	J1 League	36	9	—		2	1	4	0	6	3	1	0	49	13
Kawasaki Frontale	2025	J1 League	37	6	—		2	0	4	0	7	3	—		50	9
Kawasaki Frontale	Total		134	29	—		10	2	12	2	23	10	1	0	180	43
Career total			230	40	38	6	14	3	12	2	23	10	14	1	329	62

== Honours ==
Fortaleza

- Campeonato Brasileiro Série B: 2018

Kawasaki Frontale

- J1 League: 2021
- Japanese Super Cup: 2024

Individual

- J.League Best XI: 2022
