= Kento Tachibanada =

Japanese footballer

Kento Tachibanada 橘田 健人
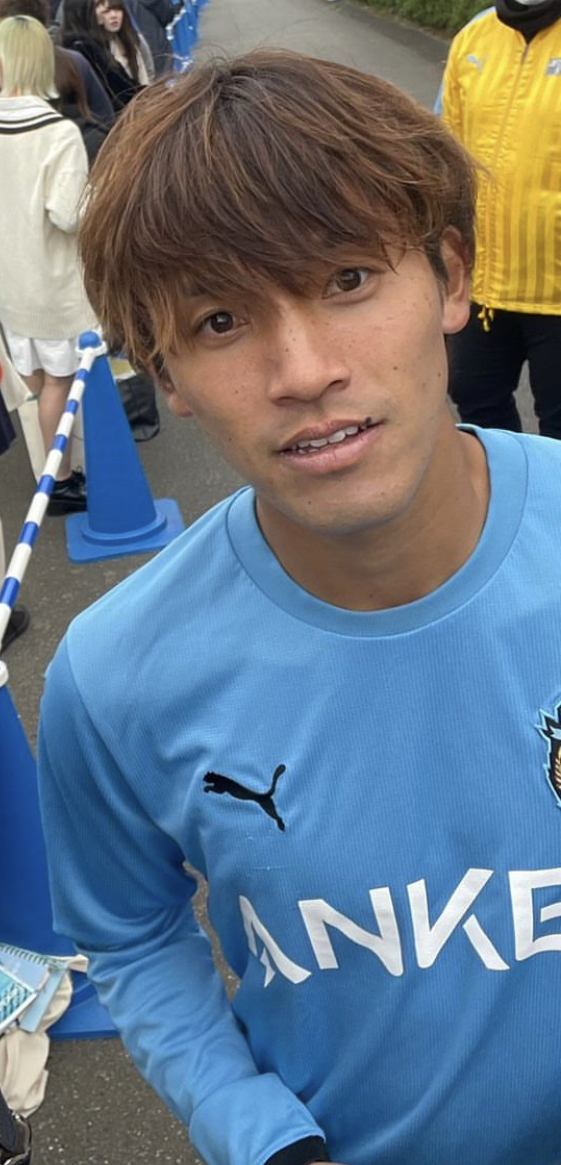
- with a fan in 2023

Personal information
- Date of birth: 29 May 1998 (age 28)
- Place of birth: Kirishima, Kagoshima, Japan
- Height: 1.69 m (5 ft 7 in)
- Position: Defensive midfielder

Team information
- Current team: Kawasaki Frontale
- Number: 8

Youth career
- 2005–2010: Kokubu Nishi SSS
- 2011–2013: Maizuru Junior High School
- 2014–2016: Kamimura Gakuen High School

College career
Years	Team	Apps	(Gls)
2017–2020	Toin University of Yokohama		

Senior career*
Years	Team	Apps	(Gls)
2020–	Kawasaki Frontale	176	(8)
- * Club domestic league appearances and goals as of 8 August 2026

Kento Tachibanada (橘田 健人, Tachibanada Kento; born 29 May 1998) is a Japanese footballer currently playing as a defensive midfielder for J1 League club Kawasaki Frontale.

== Club career ==
On 18 January 2023, Tachibanada was appointed as the captain of Kawasaki Frontale for the 2023 season.

On 3 October 2023, Tachibanada scored a goal the 88th minute to win the match against Ulsan Hyundai in the 2023–24 AFC Champions League group stage fixtures.

5 days later on 8 October 2023, he scored another goal, this time in the 53rd minute of the semi-final match of 2023 Emperor's Cup against Avispa Fukuoka in Todoroki Stadium.

== Career statistics ==
=== Club ===
As of the start from 2025 season.

Club	Season	League			National Cup		League Cup		Continental		Other		Total	
Club	Season	Division	Apps	Goals	Apps	Goals	Apps	Goals	Apps	Goals	Apps	Goals	Apps	Goals
Toin University	2019	—			2 (Note: Appearances in the Emperor's Cup)	0	—		—		—		2	0
Toin University	2020	—			2	0	—		—		—		2	0
Toin University	Total		—		4	0	—		—		—		4	0
Kawasaki Frontale	2021	J1 League	29	0	5	1	2	0	6 (Note: Appearance(s) in the AFC Champions League)	4	1 (Note: Appearance(s) in the Japanese Super Cup)	0	43	5
Kawasaki Frontale	2022	J1 League	32	2	1	0	2	0	6	0	1	0	42	2
Kawasaki Frontale	2023	J1 League	30	2	6	1	3	0	5	2	—		44	5
Kawasaki Frontale	2024	J1 League	35	3	2	0	4	0	8	0	1	0	50	3
Kawasaki Frontale	Total		126	7	14	2	11	0	25	6	3	0	179	15
Career total			126	7	18	2	11	0	25	6	3	0	183	15

== Honours ==
=== Club ===
- J1 League: 2021
- Emperor's Cup: 2023
- Japanese Super Cup: 2021, 2024
