= 2019 Kawasaki Frontale season =

Kawasaki Frontale
2019 season
- Chairman: Yoshihiro Warashina
- Manager: Toru Oniki
- Stadium: Kawasaki Todoroki Stadium
- J1 League: 4th
- Emperor's Cup: Fourth round
- J. League Cup: Winners
- Japanese Super Cup: Winners
- AFC Champions League: Group Stage
- Top goalscorer: League: Yu Kobayashi (13); All: Yu Kobayashi (17)
- Average home league attendance: 23,272
Home colours	Away colours

The 2019 Kawasaki Frontale season was their 15th consecutive season in J1 League. They were the defending champions after finishing top of 2018 J1 League. They also competed in the Emperor's Cup, J.League Cup, Japanese Super Cup and AFC Champions League.

== Squad ==
As of 14 January 2019. Note: Flags indicate national team as defined under FIFA eligibility rules; some limited exceptions apply. Players may hold more than one non-FIFA nationality.

No.	Pos.	Nation	Player
1	GK	KOR	Jung Sung-ryong
2	DF	JPN	Kyohei Noborizato
3	DF	JPN	Tatsuki Nara
4	DF	BRA	Jesiel (on loan from Atlético Mineiro)
5	MF	JPN	Shogo Taniguchi
6	MF	JPN	Hidemasa Morita
7	DF	JPN	Shintaro Kurumaya
8	MF	JPN	Hiroyuki Abe
9	FW	BRA	Leandro Damião
10	MF	JPN	Ryota Oshima
11	FW	JPN	Yu Kobayashi (captain)
14	MF	JPN	Kengo Nakamura
16	MF	JPN	Tatsuya Hasegawa
17	DF	JPN	Kazuaki Mawatari
19	MF	JPN	Manabu Saito
20	FW	JPN	Kei Chinen

No.	Pos.	Nation	Player
21	GK	JPN	Shota Arai
22	MF	JPN	Hokuto Shimoda
23	GK	JPN	Eisuke Fujishima (on loan from Renofa Yamaguchi FC)
24	GK	JPN	Shunsuke Ando
25	MF	JPN	Ao Tanaka
26	DF	BRA	Maguinho
27	FW	JPN	Yuto Suzuki
28	MF	JPN	Yasuto Wakizaka
29	DF	NZL	Michael Fitzgerald
30	FW	JPN	Taisei Miyashiro
31	MF	JPN	Koki Harada
34	MF	JPN	Kazuya Yamamura
41	MF	JPN	Akihiro Ienaga
44	FW	BRA	Caio César

== Competitions ==
=== Super Cup ===
16 February 2019	Kawasaki Frontale	1 – 0	Urawa Red Diamonds	Saitama Stadium 2002
13:35	Leandro Damião (yellow card) 27' (goal) 52'; Taniguchi (yellow card) 67'	Report	Makino (yellow card) 33'	Attendance: 52,587; Referee: Masaaki Iemoto Toma

=== J1 League ===
==== Table ====
Pos	Team	Pld	W	D	L	GF	GA	GD	Pts	Qualification or relegation
2	FC Tokyo	34	19	7	8	46	29	+17	64	Qualification for the Champions League play-off round
3	Kashima Antlers	34	18	9	7	54	30	+24	63	Qualification for the Champions League play-off round
4	Kawasaki Frontale	34	16	12	6	57	34	+23	60	
5	Cerezo Osaka	34	18	5	11	39	25	+14	59	
6	Sanfrecce Hiroshima	34	15	10	9	45	29	+16	55	

Source: Meiji Yasuda J1 League
Rules for classification: 1) Points; 2) Goal difference; 3) Goals scored.

==== Results ====
23 February 2019 1	Kawasaki Frontale	0 – 0	FC Tokyo	Kawasaki
14:03 JST	Kurumaya (yellow card) 32'; Nakamura (yellow card) 66'; Nara (yellow card) 79'	Report	Takahagi (yellow card) 83'; Na (yellow card) 90+1'	Stadium: Kawasaki Todoroki Stadium; Attendance: 23,113; Referee: Nobutsugu Murakami

1 March 2019 2	Kawasaki Frontale	1 – 1	Kashima Antlers	Kawasaki
19:03 JST	Nakamura 9'; Oshima (yellow card) 66'	Report	Ito 21'; Anzai (yellow card) 38'; Abe (yellow card) 67'	Stadium: Kawasaki Todoroki Stadium; Attendance: 23,927; Referee: Ryuji Sato

10 March 2019 3	Yokohama F. Marinos	2 – 2	Kawasaki Frontale	Yokohama
14:03 JST	Marcos Junior 23'; Hirose (yellow card) 29'; Bunmathan (yellow card) 58'; Edigar Junio (yellow card) 71'; Nakagawa (yellow card) 79'; Ogihara 90+5'	Report	Leandro Damião 4', 88'; Ienaga (yellow card) 58'	Stadium: Nissan Stadium; Attendance: 36,216; Referee: Jumpei Iida

17 March 2019 4	Kawasaki Frontale	0 – 1	Gamba Osaka	Kawasaki
15:03 JST	Leandro Damião (yellow card) 84'	Report	Kim (yellow card) 21'; Miura 90+1'	Stadium: Kawasaki Todoroki Stadium; Attendance: 23,982; Referee: Hiroyuki Kimura

31 March 2019 5	Matsumoto Yamaga	0 – 2	Kawasaki Frontale	Matsumoto
14:00 JST	Eduardo (yellow card) 39'; Paulinho (yellow card) 61'; Tsukagawa (yellow card) 78'	Report	Chinen 44'; Abe 64'	Stadium: Naganoken Matsumotodaira Wide Area Park General Stadium; Attendance: 18,563; Referee: (Japan) Yudai Yamamoto

5 April 2019 6	Kawasaki Frontale	1 – 1	Cerezo Osaka	Kawasaki
19:00 JST	Chinen 49'	Report	Kakitani 22'; Matsuda (yellow card) 32'	Stadium: Kawasaki Todoroki Stadium; Attendance: 21,494; Referee: (Japan) Yuichi Nishimura

14 April 2019 7	Sagan Tosu	0 – 1	Kawasaki Frontale	Tosu
14:00 JST	Kanazaki (yellow card) 40'; Takahashi (yellow card) 63'	Report	Fitzgerald (yellow card) 25'; Chinen 51'; Mawatari (yellow card) 64'; Ienaga (yellow card) 90+3'	Stadium: Ekimae Real Estate Stadium; Attendance: 14,463; Referee: (Japan) Minoru Tōjō

19 April 2019 8	Kawasaki Frontale	2 – 0	Shonan Bellmare	Kawasaki
19:00 JST	Abe 21'; Chinen 37'	Report	Yamane (yellow card) 27'	Stadium: Kawasaki Todoroki Stadium; Attendance: 19,556; Referee: (Japan) Massaki Iemoto

28 April 2019 9	Vissel Kobe	1 – 2	Kawasaki Frontale	Kobe
14:00 JST	Nishi (yellow card) 44'; Furuhashi 82'	Report	Mawatari 15'; Kobayashi 37'	Stadium: Noevir Stadium Kobe; Attendance: 25,929; Referee: (Japan) Hajime Matsuo

3 May 2019 10	Kawasaki Frontale	3 – 1	Vegalta Sendai	Kawasaki
15:00 JST	Kobayashi 13' 53' (pen.); Hasegawa 37'	Report	Kim Jung-ya (yellow card) 63'; Oiwa 68'	Stadium: Kawasaki Todoroki Stadium; Attendance: 25,789; Referee: (Japan) Masuya Ueda

12 May 2019 11	Shimizu S-Pulse	0 – 4	Kawasaki Frontale	Shizuoka
14:00 JST	Elsinho (yellow card) 12'	Report	Kobayashi 23'; Wakizaka 45'; Oshima 80'; Leandro Damião 90+1'	Stadium: IAI Stadium Nihondaira; Attendance: 14,125; Referee: (Japan) Ryuji Sato

17 May 2019 12	Kawasaki Frontale	1 – 1	Nagoya Grampus	Kawasaki
19:00 JST	Leandro Damião 69'	Report	Mateus 45'; Gabriel Xavier (yellow card) 67'; Miyahara (yellow card) 74'	Stadium: Kawasaki Todoroki Stadium; Attendance: 24,821; Referee: (Japan) Yuichi Nishimura

26 May 2019 13	Oita Trinita	0 – 1	Kawasaki Frontale	Ōita
16:00 JST	Takayama (yellow card) 70'	Report	Maguinho 28'	Stadium: Showa Denko Dome Oita; Attendance: 14,012; Referee: (Japan) Hiroki Kasahara

1 June 2019 14	Kawasaki Frontale	1 – 1	Urawa Reds	Kawasaki
19:00 JST	Leandro Damião 54'; Maguinho (yellow card) 81'	Report	Ugajin (yellow card) 71'; Moriwaki 90+5'	Stadium: Kawasaki Todoroki Stadium; Attendance: 24,578; Referee: (Japan) Yusuke Araki

14 June 2019 15	Kawasaki Frontale	1 – 1	Hokkaido Consadole Sapporo	Kawasaki
19:00 JST	Chinen (yellow card) 36'; Kobayashi 69'; Taniguchi (yellow card) 73'; Jesiel (yellow card) 82'	Report	Suzuki 39' (pen.); Fukumori (yellow card) 45+1'; Kaneko (yellow card) 85'	Stadium: Kawasaki Todoroki Stadium; Attendance: 22,609; Referee: (Japan) Yudai Yamamoto

30 June 2019 16	Júbilo Iwata	1 – 3	Kawasaki Frontale	Iwata
19:00 JST	Oi (yellow card) 44'; Uehara 90+4'	Report	Kobayashi 29'; Wakizaka 50'; Jesiel (yellow card) 72'; Noborizato (yellow card) 85'; Chinen 90'	Stadium: Yamaha Stadium; Attendance: 11,241; Referee: (Japan) Hajime Matsuo

7 July 2019 17	Kawasaki Frontale	0 – 0	Sagan Tosu	Kawasaki
19:00 JST		Report	Toyoda (yellow card) 62'; An Yong-woo (yellow card) 90'	Stadium: Kawasaki Todoroki Stadium; Attendance: 22,533; Referee: (Japan) Masuya Ueda

14 July 2019 18	FC Tokyo	0 – 3	Kawasaki Frontale	Chōfu
19:00 JST		Report	Kobayashi 20'; Kurumaya (yellow card) 40'; Abe (yellow card) 44' (goal) 69'; Saitō 54'	Stadium: Ajinomoto Stadium; Attendance: 42,401; Referee: (Japan) Ryuji Sato

27 July 2019 19	Kawasaki Frontale	3 – 1	Oita Trinita	Kawasaki
19:00 JST	Saitō 51'; Kobayashi 61'; Abe 85'	Report	Suzuki (yellow card) 45'; Onaiwu 54'	Stadium: Kawasaki Todoroki Stadium; Attendance: 22,715; Referee: (Japan) Akihiko Ikeuchi

31 July 2019 20	Sanfrecce Hiroshima	3 – 2	Kawasaki Frontale	Hiroshima
19:00 JST	Sasaki 4'; Kawabe (yellow card) 17'; Douglas Vieira 23'; Araki 52'	Report	Kobayashi 75'; Leandro Damião 78'; Jesiel (yellow card) 89'	Stadium: Edion Stadium Hiroshima; Attendance: 10,965; Referee: (Japan) Massaki Iemoto

4 August 2019 21	Kawasaki Frontale	0 – 0	Matsumoto Yamaga	Kawasaki
19:00 JST		Report	Toma (yellow card) 24'	Stadium: Kawasaki Todoroki Stadium; Attendance: 22,807; Referee: (Japan) KJoichiro Fukushima

10 August 2019 22	Nagoya Grampus	3 – 0	Kawasaki Frontale	Toyota
19:00 JST	Izumi 11' 18'; Maeda 64'	Report	Taniguchi (yellow card) 27' (yellow-red card) 80'; Jesiel (yellow card) 85'	Stadium: Toyota Stadium; Attendance: 42,819; Referee: (Japan) Hiroki Katsumata

=== J. League Cup ===
==== Results ====
4 September 2019 Quarter-final first leg	Kawasaki Frontale	2–0	Nagoya Grampus	Kawasaki, Kanagawa
19:00	Chinen 15'; Wakizaka 61'	Report	Miyahara (yellow card) 13'; João Schmidt (yellow card) 43'	Stadium: Kawasaki Todoroki Stadium; Attendance: 14,719; Referee: Nobutsugu Murakami

8 September 2019 Quarter-final second leg	Nagoya Grampus	2–2 (2–4 agg.)	Kawasaki Frontale	Nagoya
18:00	Eduardo Neto (yellow card) 41'; Hasegawa 73'; Jô 89'	Report	Shimoda 53'; Leandro Damião 81'	Stadium: Paloma Mizuho Stadium; Attendance: 11,587; Referee: Hajime Matsuo

9 October 2019 Semi-finals first leg	Kawasaki Frontale	3–1	Kashima Antlers	Kawasaki, Kanagawa
19:00		Report		Stadium: Kawasaki Todoroki Stadium

13 October 2019 Semi-final second leg	Kashima Antlers	0–0 (1–3 agg.)	Kawasaki Frontale	Kashima
15:00		Report		Stadium: Kashima Soccer Stadium

26 October 2019 Final	Hokkaido Consadole Sapporo	3−3 (a.e.t.) (4−5 p)	Kawasaki Frontale	Saitama Stadium 2002, Saitama
13:05	Suga 10'; Fukai 90+5'; Fukumori 99'	report	45+3' Abe; 88', 109' Kobayashi	Attendance: 48,119; Referee: Yusuke Araki
	Penalties
	A.Lopes (penalty scored); Suzuki (penalty scored); Fukai (penalty scored); L. Fernandes (penalty scored); Ishikawa (penalty missed); Shindo (penalty missed)		(penalty scored) Kobayashi; (penalty scored) Yamamura; (penalty scored) Nakamura; (penalty missed) Kurumaya; (penalty scored) Ienaga; (penalty scored) Hasegawa

=== Emperor's Cup ===
3 July 2019 Round 2	Kawasaki Frontale	1–0	Meiji University	Kawasaki, Kanagawa
19:00		Report		Stadium: Kawasaki Todoroki Stadium

14 August 2019 Round 3	Kawasaki Frontale	2–1 (a.e.t.)	Fagiano Okayama	Okayama
19:00		Report		Stadium: City Light Stadium

18 September 2019 Round of 16	Vissel Kobe	3–2	Kawasaki Frontale	Kobe
19:00	Yamaguchi 38'; Furuhashi 45+3'; Ogawa 63'	Report	Kobayashi 70'; Kurumaya 85'	Stadium: Kobe Universiade Memorial Stadium; Attendance: 7,808; Referee: Massaki Iemoto

=== AFC Champions League ===
==== Group standings ====
Pos	Team	Pld	W	D	L	GF	GA	GD	Pts	Qualification	ULS	SSI	KAW	SYD
1	(South Korea) Ulsan Hyundai	6	3	2	1	5	7	−2	11	Advance to knockout stage	—	1–0	1–0	1–0
2	(China) Shanghai SIPG	6	2	3	1	13	8	+5	9	Advance to knockout stage	5–0	—	1–0	2–2
3	(Japan) Kawasaki Frontale	6	2	2	2	9	6	+3	8		2–2	2–2	—	1–0
4	(Australia) Sydney FC	6	0	3	3	5	11	−6	3		0–0	3–3	0–4	—

Source: AFC
Rules for classification: Group stage tiebreakers

==== Results ====
6 March 2019 Group H	Shanghai SIPG (China)	1 – 0	(Japan) Kawasaki Frontale	Shanghai Stadium, Shanghai
19:30 UTC+8	Hulk 89' (pen.)	Live Report; Stats Report		Attendance: 22,777; Referee: Mohammed Abdulla Hassan Mohamed (United Arab Emirates)

13 March 2019 Group H	Kawasaki Frontale (Japan)	1 – 0	(Australia) Sydney FC	Todoroki Athletics Stadium, Kawasaki
19:00 UTC+9	Saitō 83'	Live Report; Stats Report		Attendance: 11,278; Referee: Valentin Kovalenko (Uzbekistan)

10 April 2019 Group H	Ulsan Hyundai (South Korea)	1 – 0	(Japan) Kawasaki Frontale	Ulsan Munsu Football Stadium, Ulsan
20:00 UTC+9	Kim Su-an 90+1'	Live Report; Stats Report	Caio César (yellow card) 41'; Hasegawa (yellow card) 46'	Attendance: 2,688; Referee: Turki Al-Khudhayr (Saudi Arabia)

23 April 2019 Group H	Kawasaki Frontale (Japan)	2 – 2	(South Korea) Ulsan Hyundai	Todoroki Athletics Stadium, Kawasaki
19:00 UTC+9	Mawatari (yellow card) 4'; Kobayashi 8'; Chinen 82'	Live Report; Stats Report	Park Yong-woo 17' (yellow card) 90'; Júnior Negrão 31'; Kim Tae-hwan (yellow card) 38'; Lee Myung-jae (yellow card) 41'; Bulthuis (yellow card) 86'	Attendance: 9,812; Referee: Ammar Al-Jeneibi (United Arab Emirates)

7 May 2019 Group H	Kawasaki Frontale (Japan)	2 – 2	(China) Shanghai SIPG	Todoroki Athletics Stadium, Kawasaki
19:00 UTC+9	Leandro Damião 13' (yellow card) 63'; Morita (yellow card) 58'; Taniguchi 66' (yellow card) 88'	Live Report; Stats Report	Hulk 6' 71'; Cai Huikang (yellow card) 35'	Attendance: 11,708; Referee: Ravshan Irmatov (Uzbekistan)

21 May 2019 Group H	Sydney FC (Australia)	0 – 4	(Japan) Kawasaki Frontale	Jubilee Oval, Sydney
20:00 UTC+10	Retre (yellow card) 86'	Live Report; Stats Report	Wakizaka 9' 20'; Tanaka 28'; Leandro Damião 59'	Attendance: 3,813; Referee: (Iraq) Mohanad Qasim Sarray

== Postseason ==
19 July 2019	Kawasaki Frontale (Japan)	1 – 0	(England) Chelsea	International Stadium Yokohama
19:00	Leandro Damião 86'	Report
