= 2020 Kawasaki Frontale season =

Kawasaki Frontale
2020 season
- Chairman: Yoshihiro Warashina
- Manager: Toru Oniki
- Stadium: Kawasaki Todoroki Stadium
- J1 League: 1st (3rd title)
- Emperor's Cup: Winners
- J. League Cup: Semi-finals
- Top goalscorer: League: Yu Kobayashi (14); All: Yu Kobayashi (18)
Home colours	Away colours

The 2020 season was Kawasaki Frontale's 16th consecutive season in the J1 League, which they won for their third league title in four seasons. They also competed in the Emperor's Cup and J.League Cup, the latter of which they were defending champions.

== Squad ==
As of 20 July 2020.

Note: Flags indicate national team as defined under FIFA eligibility rules; some limited exceptions apply. Players may hold more than one non-FIFA nationality.

No.	Pos.	Nation	Player
1	GK	KOR	Jung Sung-ryong
2	DF	JPN	Kyohei Noborizato
4	DF	BRA	Jesiel
5	MF	JPN	Shogo Taniguchi (captain)
6	MF	JPN	Hidemasa Morita
7	DF	JPN	Shintaro Kurumaya
8	MF	JPN	Yasuto Wakizaka
9	FW	BRA	Leandro Damião
10	MF	JPN	Ryota Oshima
11	FW	JPN	Yu Kobayashi
13	DF	JPN	Miki Yamane
14	MF	JPN	Kengo Nakamura
15	DF	JPN	Zain Issaka
16	MF	JPN	Tatsuya Hasegawa
17	DF	BRA	Diogo Mateus

No.	Pos.	Nation	Player
18	MF	JPN	Kaoru Mitoma
19	MF	JPN	Manabu Saitō
20	FW	JPN	Taisei Miyashiro
22	MF	JPN	Hokuto Shimoda
24	GK	JPN	Shunsuke Ando
25	MF	JPN	Ao Tanaka
26	DF	JPN	Kaito Kamiya
27	GK	JPN	Kenta Tanno
28	MF	JPN	Koki Harada
30	FW	JPN	Reo Hatate
31	MF	JPN	Kento Tachibanada
34	MF	JPN	Kazuya Yamamura
40	GK	KOR	Lee Kyung-tae
41	MF	JPN	Akihiro Ienaga

== Transfers ==
=== Transfers in ===
Date	Position	Player	From	Type	Source
8 Oct 2020	GK	(South Korea) Lee Kyung-tae	(Japan) Fagiano Okayama	Loan	
1 Feb 2020	DF	(Japan) Miki Yamane	(Japan) Shonan Bellmare	Full	
1 Feb 2020	DF	(Brazil) Diogo Mateus	(Brazil) Ferroviária	Loan	
1 Feb 2020	MF	(Japan) Kaoru Mitoma	(Japan) Tsukuba University	Full	
1 Feb 2020	DF	(Japan) Kaito Kamiya	(Japan) Tokai Gakuen University	Full	
1 Feb 2020	GK	(Japan) Kenta Tanno	(Japan) Cerezo Osaka	Full	
1 Feb 2020	MF	(Japan) Zain Issaka	(Japan) Toin University	Full	
11 Jun 2020	MF	(Japan) Kento Tachibanada	(Japan) Toin University	Dual registration	
1 Feb 2020	GK	(Japan) Eisuke Fujishima	(Japan) Renofa Yamaguchi	Full	
1 Feb 2020	MF	(Japan) Reo Hatate	(Japan) Juntendo University	Full	
1 Feb 2020	GK	(Japan) Hiroki Mawatari	(Japan) Ehime FC	Full	
1 Feb 2020	DF	(Brazil) Jesiel	(Brazil) Atlético Mineiro	Full	
1 Feb 2020	FW	(Japan) Ten Miyagi	(Japan) Kawasaki Frontale U-18	Full	
1 Feb 2020	FW	(Japan) Daiya Tono	(Japan) Honda FC	Full	
1 Feb 2020	GK	(Japan) William Popp	(Japan) Oita Trinita	Return from loan	
1 Feb 2020	FW	(Japan) Shuhei Akasaki	(Japan) Nagoya Grampus	Return from loan	
1 Feb 2020	MF	(Japan) Yuto Suzuki	(Japan) Gamba Osaka	Return from loan	
1 Feb 2020	DF	(Philippines) Jefferson Tabinas	(Japan) FC Gifu	Return from loan	
1 Feb 2020	FW	(Japan) Taisei Miyashiro	(Japan) Renofa Yamaguchi	Return from loan	

=== Transfers out ===
Date	Position	Player	To	Type	Source
28 Sep 2020	GK	(Japan) Eisuke Fujishima	(Japan) Montedio Yamagata	Full	
6 Apr 2020	MF	(Japan) Koji Miyoshi	(Belgium) Royal Antwerp	Full	
1 Feb 2020	FW	(Japan) Shuhei Akasaki	(Japan) Vegalta Sendai	Full	
1 Feb 2020	GK	(Japan) Shota Arai	(Japan) JEF United Chiba	Full	
1 Feb 2020	DF	(Japan) Tatsuki Nara	(Japan) Kashima Antlers	Full	
1 Feb 2020	MF	(Japan) Hiroyuki Abe	(Japan) Nagoya Grampus	Full	
1 Feb 2020	FW	(Japan) Kei Chinen	(Japan) Oita Trinita	Loan	
1 Feb 2020	DF	(Japan) Kazuaki Mawatari	(Japan) Shonan Bellmare	Loan	
21 Mar 2020	GK	(Japan) Hiroki Mawatari	(Japan) Fagiano Okayama	Full	
1 Feb 2020	DF	(Philippines) Jefferson Tabinas	(Japan) Gamba Osaka	Loan	
1 Feb 2020	GK	(Japan) William Popp	(Japan) Fagiano Okayama	Loan	
1 Feb 2020	DF	(Brazil) Maguinho	(Japan) Yokohama FC	Loan	
1 Feb 2020	MF	(Japan) Daiya Tono	(Japan) Avispa Fukuoka	Loan	
1 Feb 2020	MF	(Japan) Yuto Suzuki	(Japan) Matsumoto Yamaga FC	Loan	
1 Feb 2020	FW	(Japan) Ten Miyagi	(Japan) Kataller Toyama	Loan	
1 Feb 2020	MF	(Brazil) Caio César	(Japan) V-Varen Nagasaki	Loan extension	

== Competitions ==
=== J1 League ===
==== Table ====
Pos	Team	Pld	W	D	L	GF	GA	GD	Pts	Qualification or relegation
1	Kawasaki Frontale (C)	34	26	5	3	88	31	+57	83	Qualification for AFC Champions League group stage (Note: Since the winners of the 2020 Emperor's Cup, Kawasaki Frontale, qualified for the Champions League group stage, the spot given to the Emperor's Cup winners (Champions League group stage) was passed to the third-placed team and the spot given to the third-place team (Champions League play-off round) was passed to the fourth-placed team.)
2	Gamba Osaka	34	20	5	9	46	42	+4	65	Qualification for AFC Champions League group stage
3	Nagoya Grampus	34	19	6	9	45	28	+17	63	Qualification for AFC Champions League group stage
4	Cerezo Osaka	34	18	6	10	46	37	+9	60	Qualification for AFC Champions League play-off round
5	Kashima Antlers	34	18	5	11	55	44	+11	59	

Source: J.League Data Site
Rules for classification: 1) Points; 2) Goal difference; 3) Head-to-head points; 4) Head-to-head goal difference; 5) Head-to-head goal scored; 6) Number of wins; 7) Goals scored; 8) Fair-play points.
(C) Champions

==== Results summary ====
Overall								Home						Away					
Pld	W	D	L	GF	GA	GD	Pts	W	D	L	GF	GA	GD	W	D	L	GF	GA	GD
34	26	5	3	88	31	+57	83	15	1	1	48	15	+33	11	4	2	40	16	+24

Last updated: 1 August 2020.
Source: see below

==== Results by matchday ====
Round	1	2	3	4	5	6	7	8	9	10	11	12	13	14	15	16	17	18	19	20	21	22	23	24	25	26	27	28	29	30	31	32	33	34
Ground	H	H	A	H	A	A	H	A	H	A	H	A	H	A	H	H	A	H	A	A	H	A	H	A	H	H	A	A	H	H	A	A	H	H
Result	D	W	W	W	W	W	W	W	W	W	W	L	W	W	W	W	W	W	W	W	W	W	W	D	W	L	D	W	L	W	D	D	W	W
Position	11	6	2	1	1	1	1	1	1	1	1	1	1	1	1	1	1	1	1	1	1	1	1	1	1	1	1	1	1	1	1	1	1	1

Updated to match(es) played on 8 August 2020. Source: See Below
A = Away; H = Home; W = Win; D = Draw; L = Loss

==== Matches ====
22 February 2020 1	Kawasaki Frontale	0–0	Sagan Tosu	Kawasaki, Kanagawa
15:03 JST		Report	Tiago Alves (yellow card) 80'; Riki Harakawa (yellow card) 83'	Stadium: Kawasaki Todoroki Stadium; Attendance: 15,535; Referee: Hiroyuki Kimura

4 July 2020 2	Kawasaki Frontale	2–1	Kashima Antlers	Kawasaki, Kanagawa
19:03 JST	Taniguchi 2'; Hasegawa 30'; Ienaga (yellow card) 43'; Yamane (yellow card) 81'	Report	Uchida (yellow card) 17'; Own goal 32'; Machida (yellow card) 76'; Nagaki (yellow card) 87'	Stadium: Kawasaki Todoroki Stadium; Attendance: 0 (Note: Match played behind closed doors); Referee: Jumpei Iida

8 July 2020 3	FC Tokyo	0–4	Kawasaki Frontale	Chōfu, Tokyo
19:33 JST		Report	Oshima 17'; Damião 23'; Hasegawa 28', 45'; Tanaka (yellow card) 56'	Stadium: Ajinomoto Stadium; Attendance: 0 Referee: Hiroyuki Kimura

11 July 2020 4	Kawasaki Frontale	3–1	Kashiwa Reysol	Kawasaki, Kanagawa
19:00 JST	Wakizaka 31'; Ienaga 40', 42'; Kurumaya (yellow card) 44'; Damião 52'; Morita (yellow card) 89'	Report	Goya 56'; Someya (yellow card) 61'; Segawa (yellow card) 90+4'	Stadium: Kawasaki Todoroki Stadium; Attendance: 4,724; Referee: Masuya Ueda

18 July 2020 5	Yokohama FC	1–5	Kawasaki Frontale	Kanagawa-ku, Yokohama
18:00 JST	Tashiro 59'	Report	Wakizaka 28'; Kobayashi 75', 83'; Ienaga 78'; Tanibuchi 90+6'	Stadium: NHK Spring Mitsuzawa Football Stadium; Attendance: 2,733; Referee: Minoru Tōjō

22 July 2020 6	Vegalta Sendai	2–3	Kawasaki Frontale	Sendai
19:30 JST	Nagasawa 30'; Michibuchi 38'	Report	Kobayashi 58', 68'; Yamane 59'	Stadium: Yurtec Stadium Sendai; Attendance: 2,507; Referee: Yuichi Nishimura

26 July 2020 7	Kawasaki Frontale	3–1	Shonan Bellmare	Kawasaki, Kanagawa
19:00 JST	Yamane 61'; Mitoma 78'; Tanaka 88'	Report	Elyounoussi 57'	Stadium: Kawasaki Todoroki Stadium; Attendance: 4,724; Referee: Masaaki Iemoto

1 August 2020 8	Gamba Osaka	0–1	Kawasaki Frontale	Suita
19:00 JST		Report	Oshima 48'	Stadium: Panasonic Stadium Suita; Attendance: 4,925; Referee: Koichiro Fukushima

8 August 2020 9	Kawasaki Frontale	2–0	Oita Trinita	Kawasaki, Kanagawa
19:00 JST	Mitoma 5'; Damião 24'	Report		Stadium: Kawasaki Todoroki Stadium; Attendance: 4,735; Referee: Yusuke Araki

15 August 2020 10	Consadole Sapporo	1–6	Kawasaki Frontale	Toyohira-ku, Sapporo
14:00 JST	Bothroyd 79'	Report	Kurumaya 35'; Mitoma 50', 63'; Damião 55'; Kobayashi 87', 90+5'	Stadium: Sapporo Dome; Attendance: 4,601; Referee: Hiroyuki Kimura

19 August 2020 11	Kawasaki Frontale	5–2	Cerezo Osaka	Kawasaki, Kanagawa
19:00 JST	Wakizaka 21'; Ienaga 42'; Kobayashi 53'; Mitoma 75'; Damião 77'	Report	Mendes 7'; Seko 58'	Stadium: Kawasaki Todoroki Stadium; Attendance: 4,794; Referee: Takuto Okabe

23 August 2020 12	Nagoya Grampus	1–0	Kawasaki Frontale	Toyota
18:00 JST	Kanazaki 44'	Report		Stadium: Toyota Stadium; Attendance: 4,968; Referee: Ryuji Sato

26 August 2020 24	Vissel Kobe	2–2	Kawasaki Frontale	Hyōgo-ku, Kobe
19:00 JST	Nishi 30'; Douglas 42'	Report	Oshima 23'; Hatate 75'	Stadium: Noevir Stadium Kobe; Attendance: 3,453; Referee: Yoshiro Imamura
Note: rescheduled due to Kobe's later AFC Champions League commitments.

29 August 2020 13	Kawasaki Frontale	5–0	Shimizu S-Pulse	Kawasaki, Kanagawa
19:00 JST	Hatate 21' 74'; Damião 51'; Nakamura 85'; Mitoma 87'	Report		Stadium: Kawasaki Todoroki Stadium; Attendance: 4,798; Referee: Hayato Shimizu

5 September 2020 14	Yokohama F. Marinos	1–3	Kawasaki Frontale	Yokohama
18:00 JST	Marcos Júnior 2'	Report	Mitoma 33' 50'; Ienaga 48'	Stadium: Nissan Stadium; Attendance: 4,971; Referee: Masaaki Iemoto

9 September 2020 15	Kawasaki Frontale	3–2	Vissel Kobe	Kawasaki, Kanagawa
18:30 JST	Kobayashi 8'; Damião 83'; Miyashiro 85'	Report	Furuhashi 23'; Fujimoto 59'	Stadium: Kawasaki Todoroki Stadium; Attendance: 4,778; Referee: Hiroyuki Kimura

13 September 2020 16	Kawasaki Frontale	5–1	Sanfrecce Hiroshima	Kawasaki, Kanagawa
18:30 JST	Tanaka 14' 51'; Damião 47'; Yamamura 50'; Kobayashi 88'	Report	Asano 90'	Stadium: Kawasaki Todoroki Stadium; Attendance: 4,770; Referee: Minoru Tōjō

20 September 2020 17	Urawa Reds	0–3	Kawasaki Frontale	Saitama, Saitama
19:00 JST		Report	Yamane 37'; Kobayashi 50'; Damião 90+2'	Stadium: Saitama Stadium 2002; Attendance: 6,357; Referee: Ryuji Sato

23 September 2020 18	Kawasaki Frontale	3–2	Yokohama FC	Kawasaki, Kanagawa
19:00 JST	Tanaka 22'; Hatate 46' 67'	Report	Kobayashi 48'; Sato 74'	Stadium: Kawasaki Todoroki Stadium; Attendance: 4,723; Referee: Yusuke Araki

27 September 2020 19	Shonan Bellmare	0–1	Kawasaki Frontale	Hiratsuka, Kanagawa
19:00 JST		Report	Kobayashi 18'	Stadium: Shonan BMW Stadium Hiratsuka; Attendance: 4,189; Referee: Masaaki Iemoto

3 October 2020 20	Cerezo Osaka	1–3	Kawasaki Frontale	Osaka
15:00 JST	Okuno 62'	Report	Seko 37' (o.g.); Damião 83'; Mitoma 84'	Stadium: Yanmar Stadium Nagai; Attendance: 11,842; Referee: Minoru Tōjō

10 October 2020 21	Kawasaki Frontale	1–0	Vegalta Sendai	Kawasaki, Kanagawa
18:00 JST	Kobayashi 41'	Report		Stadium: Kawasaki Todoroki Stadium; Attendance: 8,263; Referee: Koichiro Fukushima

14 October 2020 22	Sanfrecce Hiroshima	0–2	Kawasaki Frontale	Hiroshima
19:00 JST		Report	Damião 56'; Mitoma 90+5'	Stadium: Edion Stadium Hiroshima; Attendance: 3,007; Referee: Ryuji Sato

18 October 2020 23	Kawasaki Frontale	3–0	Nagoya Grampus	Kawasaki, Kanagawa
19:00 JST	Mitoma 44'; Jesiel 57' 65'	Report		Stadium: Kawasaki Todoroki Stadium; Attendance: 10,161; Referee: Hiroyoshi Takayama

31 October 2020 25	Kawasaki Frontale	2–1	FC Tokyo	Kawasaki, Kanagawa
18:00 JST	Ienaga 24' (pen.); Nakamura 74'	Report	Diego Oliveira 57'	Stadium: Kawasaki Todoroki Stadium; Attendance: 11,061; Referee: Hajime Matsuo

3 November 2020 26	Kawasaki Frontale	0–2	Consadole Sapporo	Kawasaki, Kanagawa
14:00 JST		Report	Lopes 62'; Arano 65'	Stadium: Kawasaki Todoroki Stadium; Attendance: 11,165; Referee: Hajime Matsuo

14 November 2020 27	Kashima Antlers	1–1	Kawasaki Frontale	Kashima, Ibaraki
17:00 JST	Everaldo 75'	Report	Wakizaka 18'	Stadium: Kashima Soccer Stadium; Attendance: 13,463; Referee: Ryuji Sato

18 November 2020 30	Kawasaki Frontale	3–1	Yokohama F. Marinos	Kawasaki, Kanagawa
19:00 JST	Mitoma 53'; Jesiel 90'; Kobayashi 90+5'	Report	Hatanaka 59'	Stadium: Kawasaki Todoroki Stadium; Attendance: 11,099; Referee: Hiroyuki Kimura

21 November 2020 28	Oita Trinita	1–0	Kawasaki Frontale	Oita, Oita
18:00 JST	Nomura 36'	Report		Stadium: Showa Denko Dome Oita; Attendance: 9,820; Referee: Hiroki Kasahara

25 November 2020 29	Kawasaki Frontale	5–0	Gamba Osaka	Kawasaki, Kanagawa
18:30 JST	Damião 22'; Ienaga 45' 49' 73'; Saito 90'	Report		Stadium: Kawasaki Todoroki Stadium; Attendance: 11,360; Referee: Yuichi Nishimura

5 December 2020 31	Shimizu S-Pulse	2–2	Kawasaki Frontale	Shizuoka, Shizuoka
14:00 JST	Carlinhos Júnior 11'; Renato Augusto 40'	Report	Tanaka 21'; Yamane 89'	Stadium: IAI Stadium Nihondaira; Attendance: 8,730; Referee: Koichiro Fukushima

12 December 2020 32	Sagan Tosu	1–1	Kawasaki Frontale	Tosu, Saga
14:00 JST	López 86'	Report	Taniguchi 57'	Stadium: Ekimae Real Estate Stadium; Attendance: 9,451; Referee: Masaaki Iemoto

16 December 2020 33	Kawasaki Frontale	3–1	Urawa Red Diamonds	Kawasaki, Kanagawa
19:00 JST	Morita 53'; Mitoma 59'; Kobayashi 61'	Report	Koroki 11'	Stadium: Kawasaki Todoroki Stadium; Attendance: 11,387; Referee: Yoshiro Imamura

19 December 2020 34	Kashiwa Reysol	2–3	Kawasaki Frontale	Kashiwa, Chiba
14:00 JST	Olunga 14'; Segawa 46'	Report	Ienaga 48' 81'; Leandro Damião 55'	Stadium: Sankyo Frontier Kashiwa Stadium; Attendance: 5,137; Referee: Jumpei Iida

=== Emperor's Cup ===
==== Results ====
27 December 2020 Semi-final	Kawasaki Frontale	2–0	Blaublitz Akita	Kawasaki, Kanagawa
13:00 JST	Mitoma 39'; Tanaka 83'	Report		Stadium: Kawasaki Todoroki Stadium; Attendance: 9,772; Referee: Yudai Yamamoto

1 January 2021 Final	Kawasaki Frontale	1–0	Gamba Osaka	Shinjuku, Tokyo
14:40 JST	Mitoma 55'	Report		Stadium: Japan National Stadium; Attendance: 13,318; Referee: Hiroyuki Kimura

=== J.League Cup ===
==== Group stage ====
Pos	Team	Pld	W	D	L	GF	GA	GD	Pts	FRO	GRA	ANT	SSP
1	Kawasaki Frontale	3	2	1	0	10	5	+5	7	—	—	—	5–1
2	Nagoya Grampus	3	2	1	0	6	2	+4	7 (Note: Most points among the 2nd place finishers in each group.)	2–2	—	1–0	—
3	Kashima Antlers	3	1	0	2	5	6	−1	3	2–3	—	—	—
4	Shimizu S-Pulse	3	0	0	3	3	11	−8	0	—	0–3	2–3	—

Updated to match(es) played on 12 August 2020. Source: League table, match result
Legend: Blue = home team win; Yellow = draw; Red = away team win.

==== Matches ====
16 February 2020 1	Kawasaki Frontale	5–1	Shimizu S-Pulse	Kawasaki, Kanagawa
14:03 JST	Damião 10'; Hasegawa 23' 74'; Kobayashi 83' 90+5'	Report	Ishige 67'	Stadium: Kawasaki Todoroki Stadium; Attendance: 17,057; Referee: Yuichi Nishimura

5 August 2020 2	Kashima Antlers	2–3	Kawasaki Frontale	Kashima, Ibaraki
19:03 JST	Ito 84' 90+3'	Report	Mitoma 43'; Ryota Oshima 47'; Reo Hatate 55'	Stadium: Kashima Soccer Stadium; Attendance: 2,591; Referee: Hiroyuki Kimura

12 August 2020 3	Nagoya Grampus	2–2	Kawasaki Frontale	Nagoya, Aichi
19:03 JST	Soma 1'; Gabriel Xavier 7'	Report	Mitoma 6' 38'	Stadium: Paloma Mizuho Stadium; Attendance: 4,858; Referee: Akihiko Ikeuchi

2 September 2020 Quarter-final	Vissel Kobe	0–6	Kawasaki Frontale	Kobe, Hyogo
19:03 JST		Report	Kobayashi 7' 13'; Saito 21'; Ienaga 46'; Wakizaka 72'; Miyashiro 87'	Stadium: Noevir Stadium Kobe; Attendance: 3,925; Referee: Yusuke Araki

7 October 2020 Semi-final	Kawasaki Frontale	0–2	FC Tokyo	Kawasaki, Kanagawa
19:00 JST		Report	Leandro 14' 62'	Stadium: Kawasaki Todoroki Stadium; Attendance: 6,635; Referee: Yuichi Nishimura

== Honors ==
=== Individual ===
- J. League Best Eleven (9): Jung Sung-ryong, Miki Yamane, Jesiel, Shogo Taniguchi, Kyohei Noborizato, Hidemasa Morita, Ao Tanaka, Akihiro Ienaga, Kaoru Mitoma
- J. League Best Eleven finalists (13): Jung Sung-ryong, Miki Yamane, Jesiel, Shogo Taniguchi, Kyohei Noborizato, Hidemasa Morita, Ao Tanaka, Akihiro Ienaga, Kaoru Mitoma, Ryota Oshima, Yasuto Wakizaka, Yū Kobayashi, Leandro Damião

== Statistics ==
=== Goal scorers ===
Rank	No.	Pos.	Player	J.League	Emperor's Cup	J.League Cup	Total
1	11	FW	(Japan) Yu Kobayashi	14	0	4	18
2	18	MF	(Japan) Kaoru Mitoma	13	2	3	18
3	9	FW	(Brazil) Leandro Damião	13	0	1	14
4	41	MF	(Japan) Akihiro Ienaga	11	0	1	12
5	30	FW	(Japan) Reo Hatate	5	0	1	6
5	25	MF	(Japan) Ao Tanaka	5	1	0	6
7	16	MF	(Japan) Tatsuya Hasegawa	3	0	2	5
8	10	MF	(Japan) Ryota Oshima	3	0	1	4
8	8	MF	(Japan) Yasuto Wakizaka	3	0	1	4
10	13	DF	(Japan) Miki Yamane	4	0	0	4
11	5	DF	(Japan) Shogo Taniguchi	3	0	0	3
12	4	DF	(Brazil) Jesiel	3	0	0	3
13	20	FW	(Japan) Taisei Miyashiro	1	0	1	2
13	14	MF	(Japan) Kengo Nakamura	2	0	0	2
15	7	DF	(Japan) Shintaro Kurumaya	1	0	0	1
15	19	MF	(Japan) Manabu Saito	1	0	1	2
15	34	MF	(Japan) Kazuya Yamamura	1	0	0	1
15	6	MF	(Japan) Hidemasa Morita	1	0	0	1
Total				87	3	16	106

Last updated: 8 August 2020.
Source: Competitions

=== Clean sheets ===
Rank	No.	Pos.	Player	J.League	Emperor's Cup	J.League Cup	Total
1	1	GK	(South Korea) Jung Sung-ryong	11	2	1	14
Total				11	2	1	14

Last updated: 8 August 2020.
Source: JLeague
