= 2018 Kawasaki Frontale season =

Kawasaki Frontale
2018 season
- Manager: Toru Oniki
- Stadium: Kawasaki Todoroki Stadium
- J1 League: Champions
- 2018 AFC Champions League: Group stage
- 2018 Emperor's Cup: Quarter finals
| Home colours | Away colours |

The 2018 Kawasaki Frontale season was their 14th consecutive season in J1 League, they were defending champions after finishing top of the 2017 J1 League. They also competed in the J.League Cup, Emperor's Cup, and AFC Champions League.

== Squad ==
As of 22 January 2018.

Note: Flags indicate national team as defined under FIFA eligibility rules; some limited exceptions apply. Players may hold more than one non-FIFA nationality.

| No. | Pos. | Nation | Player |
|---|---|---|---|
| 1 | GK | KOR | Jung Sung-ryong |
| 2 | DF | JPN | Kyohei Noborizato |
| 3 | DF | JPN | Tatsuki Nara |
| 4 | FW | JPN | Yoshito Okubo |
| 5 | MF | JPN | Shogo Taniguchi |
| 6 | MF | JPN | Yusuke Tasaka |
| 7 | DF | JPN | Shintaro Kurumaya |
| 8 | MF | JPN | Hiroyuki Abe |
| 9 | FW | JPN | Shuhei Akasaki |
| 10 | MF | JPN | Ryota Oshima |
| 11 | FW | JPN | Yu Kobayashi (captain) |
| 14 | MF | JPN | Kengo Nakamura |
| 16 | MF | JPN | Tatsuya Hasegawa |
| 17 | DF | JPN | Yuto Takeoka |
| 18 | DF | BRA | Elsinho |
| 19 | MF | JPN | Kentaro Moriya |

| No. | Pos. | Nation | Player |
|---|---|---|---|
| 20 | FW | JPN | Kei Chinen |
| 21 | MF | BRA | Eduardo Neto |
| 22 | MF | JPN | Hokuto Shimoda |
| 23 | DF | BRA | Eduardo Bendini |
| 24 | GK | JPN | Shunsuke Ando |
| 25 | MF | JPN | Hidemasa Morita |
| 26 | DF | PHI | Jefferson Tabinas |
| 27 | FW | JPN | Yuto Suzuki |
| 28 | MF | JPN | Yasuto Wakizaka |
| 29 | DF | JPN | Michael Fitzgerald |
| 30 | GK | JPN | Shota Arai |
| 31 | GK | JPN | William Popp |
| 32 | MF | JPN | Ao Tanaka |
| 33 | MF | JPN | Taisei Miyashiro |
| 37 | MF | JPN | Manabu Saito |
| 41 | MF | JPN | Akihiro Ienaga |

=== Out on loan ===
Note: Flags indicate national team as defined under FIFA eligibility rules; some limited exceptions apply. Players may hold more than one non-FIFA nationality.

| No. | Pos. | Nation | Player |
|---|---|---|---|
| — | DF | JPN | Ko Itakura (at Vegalta Sendai) |
| — | MF | JPN | Koji Miyoshi (at Consadole Sapporo) |

== Competitions ==
=== Super Cup ===
| 10 February 2018 | Kawasaki Frontale | 2–3 | Cerezo Osaka | Saitama Stadium 2002, Saitama |
| 13:35 JST | Kobayashi 51'; Okubo 90+2' | Report | 26' Yamaguchi; 48' Kiyotake; 78' Takagi | Attendance: 41,803; Referee: Koichiro Fukushima |

=== J1 League ===
==== League table ====
| Pos | Team | Pld | W | D | L | GF | GA | GD | Pts | Qualification or relegation |
|---|---|---|---|---|---|---|---|---|---|---|
| 1 | Kawasaki Frontale (C) | 34 | 21 | 6 | 7 | 57 | 27 | +30 | 69 | Qualification for the Champions League group stage |
| 2 | Sanfrecce Hiroshima | 34 | 17 | 6 | 11 | 47 | 35 | +12 | 57 | Qualification for the Champions League play-off round |
| 3 | Kashima Antlers | 34 | 16 | 8 | 10 | 50 | 39 | +11 | 56 | Qualification for the Champions League play-off round |
| 4 | Hokkaido Consadole Sapporo | 34 | 15 | 10 | 9 | 48 | 48 | 0 | 55 | |
| 5 | Urawa Red Diamonds | 34 | 14 | 9 | 11 | 51 | 39 | +12 | 51 | Qualification for the Champions League group stage (Note: Urawa Red Diamonds qualified for the 2019 AFC Champions League group stage as 2018 Emperor's Cup winners.) |

Source: Meiji Yasuda J1 League
Rules for classification: 1) Points; 2) Goal difference; 3) Goals scored
(C) Champions

=== Results ===
| 25 February 2018 1 | Júbilo Iwata | 0–3 | Kawasaki Frontale | Yamaha Stadium |
| 15:30 | Oi (yellow card) 44' | | Neto (yellow card) 12'; Nakamura 24'; Taniguchi 43'; Eduardo 45'; Eduardo (yellow card) 54' | Attendance: 31,375; Referee: Hajime Matsuo |

| 2 March 2018 2 | Kawasaki Frontale | 1–1 | Shonan Bellmare | Kawasaki Todoroki Stadium |
| 19:00 | Kobayashi 56'; Ienaga (yellow card) 69' | | Kikuchi (yellow card) 59'; Matsuda 66'; Sugioka (yellow card) 70' | Attendance: 22,475; Referee: Yusuke Araki |

| 10 March 2018 3 | Kawasaki Frontale | 2–0 | Gamba Osaka | Kawasaki Todoroki Stadium |
| 13:00 | Neto 8'; Oshima (yellow card) 50'; Ienaga 55'; Kurumaya (yellow card) 68' | | | Attendance: 22,520; Referee: Jumpei Iida |

| 18 March 2018 4 | Nagoya Grampus | 0–1 | Kawasaki Frontale | Mizuho Stadium |
| 19:00 | | | Okubo 65' | Attendance: 25,898; Referee: Masaaki Iemoto |

| 31 March 2018 5 | Kawasaki Frontale | 0–1 | Sanfrecce Hiroshima | Kawasaki Todoroki Stadium |
| 17:00 | Nakamura (yellow card) 90' | | Patric (yellow card) 83' (goal) 85' | Attendance: 24,018; Referee: Minoru Tojo |

| 8 April 2018 6 | Yokohama F. Marinos | 1–1 | Kawasaki Frontale | International Stadium Yokohama |
| 17:00 | Nakazawa 61' | | Ienaga 58' | Attendance: 37,332; Referee: Hiroyuki Kimura |

| 11 April 2018 7 | Kawasaki Frontale | 1–2 | Cerezo Osaka | Kawasaki Todoroki Stadium |
| 20:00 | Chinen 22'; Eduardo (yellow card) 47'; Neto (yellow card) 51' | | Maruhashi 31'; Fukumitsu 36' | Attendance: 17,1137; Referee: Ryuji Sato |

| 14 April 2018 8 | Vegalta Sendai | 0–0 | Kawasaki Frontale | Yurtec Stadium Sendai |
| 20:00 | | | Abe (yellow card) 64'; Morita (yellow card) 68' | Attendance: 14,024; Referee: Yuichi Nishimura |

| 21 April 2018 9 | Kawasaki Frontale | 4–1 | Kashima Antlers | Kawasaki Todoroki Stadium |
| 17:00 | Miaso 5' (o.g.); Ienaga (yellow card) 29'; Neto 47'; Taniguchi (yellow card) 51'; Nakamura 65'; Okubo 81' | | Nagaki 64'; Shoji (yellow card) 32' (yellow-red card) 77'; Kanazaki (yellow card) 79' | Attendance: 24,358; Referee: Yusuke Araki |

| 25 April 2018 10 | Sagan Tosu | 0–2 | Kawasaki Frontale | Tosu Stadium |
| 20:00 | Kobayashi (yellow card) 66' | | Abe 56'; Kobayashi 67' | Attendance: 8,490; Referee: Masaaki Iemoto |

| 28 April 2018 11 | Vissel Kobe | 1–2 | Kawasaki Frontale | Noevir Stadium Kobe |
| 17:00 | Mita (yellow card) 69' (goal) 78'; Jung (yellow card) 43' (yellow-red card) 81' | | Taniguchi 7'; Kobayashi 88' | Attendance: 19,847; Referee: Jumpei Iida |

| 2 May 2018 12 | Kawasaki Frontale | 0–2 | Urawa Red Diamonds | Kawasaki Todoroki Stadium |
| 20:00 | Jung (red card) 70'; Saito (yellow card) 76' | | Koroki 15' 50'; Iwanami (yellow card) 90+1'; Nagasawa (yellow card) 90+5' | Attendance: 22,817; Referee: Hiroyuki Kimura |

| 5 May 2018 13 | Kawasaki Frontale | 0–2 | Tokyo | Kawasaki Todoroki Stadium |
| 15:00 | Saito (yellow card) 71' | | Hashimoto 14'; Muroya (yellow card) 64'; Morishige 69' | Attendance: 24,677; Referee: Hajime Matsuo |

| 12 May 2018 14 | Kashiwa Reysol | 1–2 | Kawasaki Frontale | Sankyo Frontier Kashiwa Stadium |
| 16:00 | Ito 32' (yellow card) 86'; Kim (yellow card) 35' | | Taniguchi (yellow card) 14'; Kobayashi 58'; Suzuki 90+2' | Attendance: 12,584; Referee: Masuya Ueda |

| 20 May 2018 15 | Kawasaki Frontale | 3–0 | Shimizu S-Pulse | Kawasaki Todoroki Stadium |
| 16:00 | Nakamura 19' 57'; Abe 33' | | Hwang (yellow card) 65' | Attendance: 23,969; Referee: Ryuji Sato |

| 18 July 2018 16 | Hokkaido Consadole Sapporo | 1–2 | Kawasaki Frontale | Sapporo Dome |
| 20:00 | Tokura 90+5' | | Morita (yellow card) 8'; Elsinho 42'; Kobayashi 52' (yellow card) 63' | Attendance: 10,711; Referee: Masaaki Iemoto |

| 22 July 2018 17 | Kawasaki Frontale | 1–0 | V-Varen Nagasaki | Kawasaki Todoroki Stadium |
| 20:00 | Kobayashi 67'; Chinen (yellow card) 90+3' | | | Attendance: 22,221; Referee: Yuichi Nishimura |

| 26 September 2018 18 | Shonan Bellmare | 0–0 | Kawasaki Frontale | Shonan BMW Stadium Hiratsuka |
| 20:30 | Saito (yellow card) 6'; Saka (yellow card) 60' | | Nakamura (yellow card) 23'; Kobayashi (penalty missed) 85 | Attendance: 8,816; Referee: Jumpei Iida |

| 1 August 2018 19 | Urawa Red Diamonds | 2–0 | Kawasaki Frontale | Saitama Stadium |
| 20:00 | Koroki 7'; Hashioka (yellow card) 69'; Iwanami (yellow card) 78'; Fabrício 90+3' (pen.) | | Taniguchi (yellow card) 87' | Attendance: 28,215; Referee: Yusuke Araki |

| 5 August 2018 20 | Kawasaki Frontale | 2–0 | Yokohama F. Marinos | Kawasaki Todoroki Stadium |
| 20:00 | Kobayashi 34' 71'; Oshima (yellow card) 53'; Morita (yellow card) 64' | | Shinozuka (yellow card) 37'; Kida (yellow card) 87' | Attendance: 23,033; Referee: Masuya Ueda |

| 11 August 2018 21 | Shimizu S-Pulse | 1–2 | Kawasaki Frontale | IAI Stadium Nihondaira |
| 19:00 | Douglas 5' | | Kobayashi 32'; Oshima 64'; Saito (yellow card) 84' | Attendance: 18,129; Referee: Hajime Matsuo |

| 15 August 2018 22 | Kawasaki Frontale | 0–0 | Sagan Tosu | Kawasaki Todoroki Stadium |
| 20:00 | | | | Attendance: 24,390; Referee: Ryuji Sato |

| 19 August 2018 23 | Sanfrecce Hiroshima | 1–2 | Kawasaki Frontale | Edion Stadium Hiroshima |
| 20:00 | Patric 56'; Chiba (yellow card) 76'; Aoyama (yellow card) 78' | | Kobayashi 63' 78' (pen.) | Attendance: 14,211; Referee: Koichiro Fukushima |

| 25 August 2018 24 | Kawasaki Frontale | 1–0 | Vegalta Sendai | Kawasaki Todoroki Stadium |
| 20:00 | Nakamura 55' | | | Attendance: 23,816; Referee: Hiroyuki Kimura |

| 1 September 2018 25 | Gamba Osaka | 2–0 | Kawasaki Frontale | Panasonic Stadium Suita |
| 20:00 | Wantanabe 7'; Fábio 55'; Fujiharu (yellow card) 82' | | Elsinho (yellow card) 26' | Attendance: 19,683; Referee: Koei Koya |

| 15 September 2018 26 | Kawasaki Frontale | 7–0 | Hokkaido Consadole Sapporo | Kawasaki Todoroki Stadium |
| 20:00 | Ienaga 28' (yellow card) 45+1'; Nakamura 30'; Abe 40'; Shimoda 57'; Kobayashi 58'; Chinen 86'; Tanaka 90+1' | | Kim (yellow card) 38'; Fukumori (yellow card) 82'; Ono (yellow card) 90' | Attendance: 22,522; Referee: Atsushi Kamimura |

| 22 September 2018 27 | Kawasaki Frontale | 3–1 | Nagoya Grampus | Kawasaki Todoroki Stadium |
| 20:00 | Izumi 20' (o.g.); Abe 34'; Kobayashi 63' | | Izumi (yellow card) 38'; Neto (yellow card) 41'; Kobayashi (yellow card) 43'; Maeda 59' | Attendance: 23,790; Referee: Itaru Hirose |

| 29 September 2018 28 | V-Varen Nagasaki | 1–2 | Kawasaki Frontale | Transcosmos Stadium Nagasaki |
| 20:00 | Kurogi (yellow card) 4'; Juanma 90' | | Chinen 35'; Kobayashi 41'; Nakamura (yellow card) 64'; Ienaga (yellow card) 90' | Attendance: 12,430; Referee: Minoru Tojo |

| 7 October 2018 29 | Kashima Antlers | 0–0 | Kawasaki Frontale | Kashima Soccer Stadium |
| 14:00 | Silva (yellow card) 29'; Misao (yellow card) 66'; Jeong (yellow card) 68' | | Abe (yellow card) 28' (yellow-red card) 90+1'; Yu Kobayashi (penalty missed) 38; Morita (yellow card) 52'; Kurumaya (yellow card) 89' | Attendance: 31,798; Referee: Nobutsugu Murakami |

| 20 October 2018 30 | Kawasaki Frontale | 5–3 | Vissel Kobe | Kawasaki Todoroki Stadium |
| 20:00 | Kobayashi 13' (pen.); Ienaga 43'; Saito 65'; Oshima 69'; Elsinho 76' | | Nara 15' (o.g.); Furuhashi 28'; Mita 35' (yellow card) 71'; Oskai (yellow card) 81' | Attendance: 24,441; Referee: Yuichi Nishimura |

| 3 November 2018 31 | Kawasaki Frontale | 3–0 | Kashiwa Reysol | Kawasaki Todoroki Stadium |
| 14:00 | Ienaga 21' (yellow card) 58'; Morita (yellow card) 28'; Taniguchi 33'; Abe 89' | | Kamata (yellow card) 26' | Attendance: 24,487; Referee: Ryuji Sato |

| 10 November 2018 32 | Cerezo Osaka | 2–1 | Kawasaki Frontale | Yanmar Stadium Nagai |
| 14:00 | Sugimoto 55'; Yamamura 90+4' | | Ienaga 90' (pen.) | Referee: Nobutsugu Murakami |

| 24 November 2018 33 | Tokyo | 0–2 | Kawasaki Frontale | Ajinomoto Stadium |
| 14:00 | Higashi (yellow card) 56' | | Chinen 19'; Hasegawa 50'; Kurumaya (yellow card) 58' | Referee: Masaaki Iemoto |

| 1 December 2018 34 | Kawasaki Frontale | 2–1 | Júbilo Iwata | Kawasaki Todoroki Stadium |
| 14:00 | Nara 83'; Oi 90+4' (o.g.) | | Okubo 78' | Attendance: 24,062; Referee: Hiroyuki Kimura |

=== J. League Cup ===
==== Results ====
| 5 September 2018 Quarter finals 1st leg | Kashima Antlers | 1–1 | Kawasaki Frontale | Kashima Soccer Stadium |
| 20:00 | Nishi 19' (yellow card) 64'; Nagaki (yellow card) 72' | | Akasaki (yellow card) 27'; Chinen 32' (pen.); Elsinho (yellow card) 41'; Nara (yellow card) 72'; Taniguchi (yellow card) 75'; Ienaga (yellow card) 90' | Referee: Jumpei Iida |

| 9 September 2019 Quarter finals 2nd leg | Kawasaki Frontale | 1–3 (2–4 agg.) | Kashima Antlers | Kawasaki Todoroki Stadium |
| 20:00 | Taniguchi (yellow card) 27'; Abe 51' (pen.); Nara (yellow card) 53'; Fitzgerald (yellow card) 86' | | Silva (yellow card) 7'; Yamamoto 28' 37'; Uchida (yellow card) 71'; Serginho 72' | Attendance: 19,214; Referee: Yudai Yamamoto |

=== Emperor's Cup ===
==== Results ====
| 6 June 2018 2nd Round | Kawasaki Frontale | 3–2 | Sony Sendai | Kawasaki Todoroki Stadium |
| 20:00 | Hasegawa 52'; Elsinho 66'; Ienaga 89' | | Fujiwara 18'; Miura 33' (yellow card) 75' | Attendance: 5,488; Referee: Kazuyoshi Enomoto |

| 11 July 2018 3rd Round | Mito HollyHock | 1–1 (a.e.t.) (3–5 p) | Kawasaki Frontale | K's denki Stadium Mito |
| | Tomita 90+3' | | Taniguchi 4'; Kurumaya (yellow card) 34'; Fitzgerald (yellow card) 107' | Attendance: 3,058; Referee: Jumpei Iida |
| | Penalties |
| | (penalty scored); Tomita (penalty scored); Kishimoto (penalty scored); Funtani (penalty missed); Saito (penalty missed) | | (penalty scored); (penalty scored) Chinen; (penalty scored) Shimoda; (penalty scored) Nakamura; (penalty scored) Hasegawa |

| 24 October 2018 Quarter finals | Montedio Yamagata | 3–2 | Kawasaki Frontale | ND Soft Stadium Yamagata |
| 20:00 | Kobayashi 2'; Sakai 36'; Sakano 49' | | Chinen 60' 70'; Jung (red card) 64' | Attendance: 5,356; Referee: Yusuke Araki |

=== AFC Champions League ===
| Pos | Team | Pld | W | D | L | GF | GA | GD | Pts | Qualification | SSI | ULS | MEL | KAW |
|---|---|---|---|---|---|---|---|---|---|---|---|---|---|---|
| 1 | (China) Shanghai SIPG | 6 | 3 | 2 | 1 | 10 | 6 | +4 | 11 | Advance to knockout stage | — | 2–2 | 4–1 | 1–1 |
| 2 | (South Korea) Ulsan Hyundai | 6 | 2 | 3 | 1 | 15 | 11 | +4 | 9 | Advance to knockout stage | 0–1 | — | 6–2 | 2–1 |
| 3 | (Australia) Melbourne Victory | 6 | 2 | 2 | 2 | 11 | 16 | −5 | 8 | | 2–1 | 3–3 | — | 1–0 |
| 4 | (Japan) Kawasaki Frontale | 6 | 0 | 3 | 3 | 6 | 9 | −3 | 3 | | 0–1 | 2–2 | 2–2 | — |

Source: AFC

==== Results ====
| 13 February 2018 Group F | Kawasaki Frontale | 0–1 | Shanghai SIPG (China) | Kawasaki Todoroki Stadium |
| 19:00 | | | Elkeson 23'; Oscar (yellow card) 50' | Attendance: 12,193; Referee: Adham Mohammad |

| 20 February 2018 Group F | (South Korea) Ulsan Hyundai | 2–1 | Kawasaki Frontale | Ulsan Munsu Football Stadium |
| 19:00 | Jung 42'; Lee 66' | | Chinen 85' | Attendance: 2,398; Referee: Fahad Al-Mirdasi |

| 7 March 2018 Group F | Kawasaki Frontale | 2–2 | Melbourne Victory (Australia) | Kawasaki Todoroki Stadium |
| 19:00 | Elsinho 28'; Noborizato 55'; Neto (yellow card) 78' | | Berisha 36'; Williams (yellow card) 56'; Valeri (yellow card) 71'; George 90+2' (pen.) | Referee: Abdulrahman Al-Jassim |

| 13 March 2018 Group F | (Australia) Melbourne Victory | 1–0 | Kawasaki Frontale | AAMI Park |
| 17:30 | Williams (yellow card) 80'; Barbarouses 90' | | Eduardo (yellow card) 74' | Attendance: 6,639; Referee: Ammer Al Junaibi |

| 4 April 2018 Group F | (China) Shanghai SIPG | 1–1 | Kawasaki Frontale | Shanghai Stadium |
| 22:00 | Elkeson 68' | | Chinen 74' | Attendance: 21,657; Referee: Valentin Kovalenko |

| 18 April 2018 Group F | Kawasaki Frontale | 2–2 | Ulsan Hyundai (South Korea) | Kawasaki Todoroki Stadium |
| 20:00 | Suzuki 2'; Hasegawa 43' | | Kim (yellow card) 35'; S-h.Lee (yellow card) 44'; Park 47'; Y-j.Lee 50' | Attendance: 8,422; Referee: Khamis Al Marri |
