= Hidemasa Morita =

Japanese footballer

Hidemasa Morita 守田 英正
- Morita with Hull City in 2026

Personal information
- Full name: Hidemasa Morita
- Date of birth: 10 May 1995 (age 31)
- Place of birth: Takatsuki, Japan
- Height: 1.77 m (5 ft 10 in)
- Position: Defensive midfielder

Team information
- Current team: Hull City
- Number: 5

Youth career
- –2007: Takatsuki Shimizu
- 2008–2010: Takatsuki Daikyu Junior High School
- 2011–2013: Konko Osaka High School

College career
Years	Team	Apps	(Gls)
2014–2018	Ryutsu Keizai University		

Senior career*
Years	Team	Apps	(Gls)
2018–2020	Kawasaki Frontale	81	(1)
2021–2022	Santa Clara	48	(3)
2022–2026	Sporting CP	112	(11)
2026–	Hull City	2	(0)

International career^{‡}
2018–2025	Japan	40	(6)
- * Club domestic league appearances and goals as of 17:50, 11 October 2026 (UTC) ‡ National team caps and goals as of 15:07, 20 March 2025 (UTC)

Hidemasa Morita (守田 英正, Morita Hidemasa; born 10 May 1995) is a Japanese professional footballer who plays as a defensive midfielder for Premier League club Hull City.

== Club career ==
=== Kawasaki Frontale ===
In 2018, Morita joined Kawasaki Frontale. On 10 February, he made his professional debut as a substitute in the Japanese Super Cup against Cerezo Osaka. On 14 April, he made his first start in the league match against Vegalta Sendai. After that, he managed to secure an active role in the team, and they would go on to win the J1 League title in 2018. In 2020, he was selected in the J-League Best Eleven, along with eight other Kawasaki players, as they went on to win the J1 League title again.

=== Santa Clara ===
On 8 January 2021, it was announced that Morita would sign for Portuguese club Santa Clara in the Primeira Liga. When he made his debut on 25 January, he netted his first goal for the club, scoring the winner in the 89th minute of a 2–1 victory over Rio Ave.

=== Sporting CP ===
On 1 July 2022, it was announced that he would join Sporting CP on a permanent transfer. He would go on to make his debut for the club against Braga on 7 August. On 7 September, he made his Champions League debut against Eintracht Frankfurt. On 30 September, he scored his first goal for the club in a win against Gil Vicente.

Morita made his 150th appearance for the club on 4 March 2026, in a 1–0 home win against Porto in the first leg of the Portuguese Cup.

On 15 May 2026, Morita announced he would not be renewing his contract with Sporting CP for the 2026–27 season.

=== Hull City ===
On 24 July 2026, Morita joined Hull City on a two-year contract with the club holding an option for a further year.

== International career ==
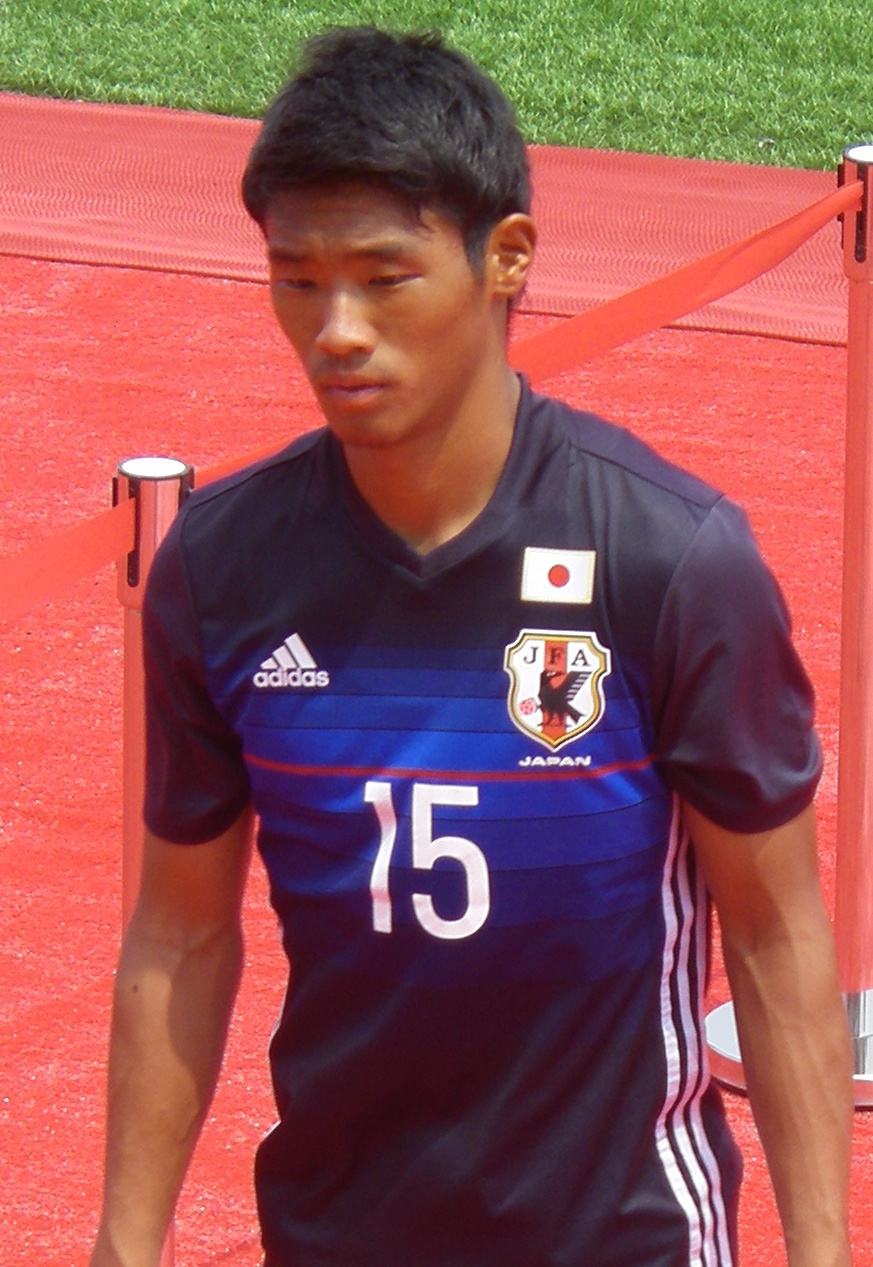
Morita with Japan in 2017.

On 2 September 2018, Ryota Oshima and Hotaru Yamaguchi withdrew from the national team due to injury; Morita was called up to the Japan national team in their place for the first time in his first year as a professional. He made his national team debut on 11 September, coming on against Costa Rica, the first game under new coach Hajime Moriyasu.

In January 2019, he was called up to the Japan national team for the AFC Asian Cup 2019, but withdrew due to injury.

In March 2021, he was called up to the national team for the first time in just under two years; on 30 March, he scored his first goal for the national team in a 14–0 win against Mongolia in the 2022 FIFA World Cup Asian Qualifiers.

On 1 November 2022, Morita was named in the Japan squad for the 2022 FIFA World Cup in Qatar.

== Career statistics ==
=== Club ===
As of match played 25 August 2026

Appearances and goals by club, season and competition
Club	Season	League			National cup (Note: Includes Emperor's Cup, Taça de Portugal, FA Cup)		League cup (Note: Includes J.League Cup, Taça da Liga, EFL Cup)		Continental		Other		Total	
Club	Season	Division	Apps	Goals	Apps	Goals	Apps	Goals	Apps	Goals	Apps	Goals	Apps	Goals
Kawasaki Frontale	2018	J1 League	26	0	4	0	0	0	5 (Note: Appearances in AFC Champions League)	0	1 (Note: Appearance in Japanese Super Cup)	0	36	0
Kawasaki Frontale	2019	J1 League	23	0	2	0	4	1	4	0	1	0	34	1
Kawasaki Frontale	2020	J1 League	32	1	2	0	4	0	—		—		38	1
Kawasaki Frontale	Total		81	1	8	0	8	1	9	0	2	0	108	2
Santa Clara	2020–21	Primeira Liga	20	2	1	0	0	0	—		—		21	2
Santa Clara	2021–22	Primeira Liga	28	1	1	0	3	0	6 (Note: Appearances in UEFA Europa Conference League)	1	—		38	2
Santa Clara	Total		48	3	2	0	3	0	6	1	—		59	4
Sporting CP	2022–23	Primeira Liga	29	6	1	0	2	0	9 (Note: Five appearances in UEFA Champions League, four appearances in UEFA Europa League)	0	—		41	6
Sporting CP	2023–24	Primeira Liga	29	2	4	0	0	0	7 (Note: Appearances in UEFA Europa League)	0	—		40	2
Sporting CP	2024–25	Primeira Liga	23	2	2	0	2	0	7 (Note: Appearances in UEFA Champions League)	0	1 (Note: Appearance in Supertaça Cândido de Oliveira)	0	35	2
Sporting CP	2025–26	Primeira Liga	31	1	5	0	2	0	11	0	1	0	50	1
Sporting CP	Total		112	11	12	0	6	0	34	0	2	0	166	11
Hull City	2026–27	Premier League	0	0	0	0	1	0	—		—		1	0
Career total			241	15	22	0	18	1	49	1	4	0	334	17

=== International ===
As of match played 20 March 2025

Appearances and goals by national team and year
National team	Year	Apps	Goals
Japan	2018	2	0
Japan	2019	1	0
Japan	2020	0	0
Japan	2021	9	2
Japan	2022	8	0
Japan	2023	8	0
Japan	2024	11	4
Japan	2025	1	0
Total		40	6

As of match played 15 November 2024. Scores and results list Japan's goal tally first, score column indicates score after each Morita goal.

List of international goals scored by Hidemasa Morita
No.	Date	Venue	Opponent	Score	Result	Competition
1	30 March 2021	Fukuda Denshi Arena, Chiba, Japan	Mongolia	4–0	14–0	2022 FIFA World Cup qualification
2	28 May 2021	Fukuda Denshi Arena, Chiba, Japan	Myanmar	6–0	10–0	2022 FIFA World Cup qualification
3	3 February 2024	Education City Stadium, Al Rayyan, Qatar	Iran	1–0	1–2	2023 AFC Asian Cup
4	10 September 2024	Bahrain National Stadium, Riffa, Bahrain	Bahrain	3–0	5–0	2026 FIFA World Cup qualification
5	10 September 2024	Bahrain National Stadium, Riffa, Bahrain	Bahrain	4–0	5–0	2026 FIFA World Cup qualification
6	15 November 2024	Gelora Bung Karno Stadium, Jakarta, Indonesia	Indonesia	3–0	4–0	2026 FIFA World Cup qualification

== Honours ==
Kawasaki Frontale

- J1 League: 2018, 2020
- Emperor's Cup: 2020
- J.League Cup: 2019
- Japanese Super Cup: 2019

Sporting CP

- Primeira Liga: 2023–24, 2024–25
- Taça de Portugal: 2024–25

Individual

- J.League Best XI: 2020
