= Caio César (footballer) =

Brazilian footballer (born 1995)

Personal information
- Full name: Caio César da Silva Silveira
- Date of birth: 27 July 1995 (age 31)
- Place of birth: São Vicente, Brazil
- Height: 1.93 m (6 ft 4 in)
- Position: Midfielder

Team information
- Current team: Thep Xanh Nam Dinh
- Number: 10

Youth career
- 2012–2014: Vila Nova

Senior career*
Years	Team	Apps	(Gls)
2014	Vila Nova	6	(0)
2015–2017	Avaí	53	(0)
2018	Tombense	25	(3)
2018–2020	Kawasaki Frontale	1	(0)
2019–2020	→ V-Varen Nagasaki (loan)	57	(6)
2021–2024	V-Varen Nagasaki	109	(7)
2024	CRB	23	(1)
2024–	Thep Xanh Nam Dinh	40	(4)
- * Club domestic league appearances and goals as of 7 June 2026

Caio César da Silva Silveira (born 27 July 1995) is a Brazilian professional footballer who plays as a midfielder for V.League 1 club Thep Xanh Nam Dinh.

== Club career ==
On 16 August 2024, Caio signed with Vietnamese side Thep Xanh Nam Dinh. On 31 August, he made his debut for the club in the 2024 Vietnamese Super Cup final, as Thep Xanh Nam Dinh defeated Dong A Thanh Hoa 3–0 and won the title.

== Career statistics ==
As of match played 30 March 2025.

Appearances and goals by club, season and competition
Club	Season	League			State League		Cup		Continental		Other		Total	
Club	Season	Division	Apps	Goals	Apps	Goals	Apps	Goals	Apps	Goals	Apps	Goals	Apps	Goals
Vila Nova	2014	Série B	4	0	2	0	—		—		—		6	0
Avaí	2016	Serie B	18	0	15	0	0	0	—		2 (Note: Appearances in Primeira Liga)	0	35	0
Avaí	2017	Série A	2	0	13	0	2	0	—		3	0	20	0
Avaí	Total		20	0	28	0	2	0	0	0	5	0	55	0
Tombense	2018	Série C	14	3	11	0	—		—		—		25	3
Kawasaki Frontale	2018	J1 League	0	0	—		0	0	0	0	0	0	0	0
Kawasaki Frontale	2019	J1 League	1	0	—		—		1 (Note: Appearance in AFC Champions League)	0	0	0	2	0
Kawasaki Frontale	Total		1	0	0	0	0	0	1	0	0	0	2	0
V-Varen Nagasaki	2019	J2 League	17	0	—		1	0	—		—		18	0
V-Varen Nagasaki	2020	J2 League	40	6	—		—		—		—		40	6
V-Varen Nagasaki	2021	J2 League	40	4	—		1	0	—		—		41	4
V-Varen Nagasaki	2022	J2 League	35	1	—		3	0	—		—		38	1
V-Varen Nagasaki	2023	J2 League	34	2	—		1	0	—		—		35	2
V-Varen Nagasaki	Total		166	13	0	0	6	0	0	0	0	0	172	13
CRB	2024	Serie B	13	0	4	0	4	0	—		6 (Note: Appearances in Copa do Nordeste)	1	27	1
Thep Xanh Nam Dinh	2024–25	V.League 1	14	1	—		1	1	8 (Note: Appearances in AFC Champions League Two)	1	1 (Note: Appearance in Vietnamese Super Cup)	0	1	0
Total career			232	16	45	0	13	1	9	1	12	1	311	19

== Honours ==
Kawasaki Frontale

- J1 League: 2018
- Japanese Super Cup: 2019

CRB

- Campeonato Alagoano: 2024

Thép Xanh Nam Định

- V.League 1: 2024–25
- Vietnamese Super Cup: 2024

Individual

- V.League 1 Team of the Season: 2024–25
