= Yu Kobayashi (footballer) =

Japanese footballer

Yū Kobayashi
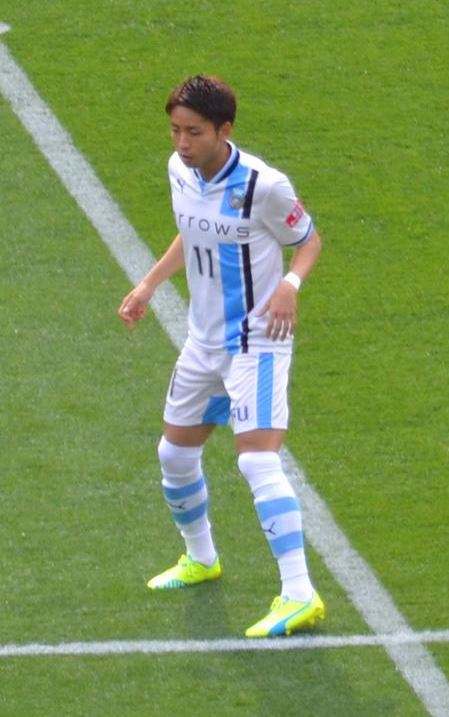

Personal information
- Full name: Yū Kobayashi
- Date of birth: 23 September 1987 (age 39)
- Place of birth: Machida, Tokyo, Japan
- Height: 1.77 m (5 ft 10 in)
- Positions: Forward; winger

Team information
- Current team: Kawasaki Frontale
- Number: 11

Youth career
- Machida JFC
- 2003–2005: Azabu University Fuchinobe High School

College career
| Years | Team | Apps | (Gls) |
| 2006–2009 | Takushoku University | | |

Senior career*
| Years | Team | Apps | (Gls) |
| 2008 | → Mito HollyHock (loan) | 5 | (0) |
| 2010– | Kawasaki Frontale | 407 | (144) |

International career
| 2014–2018 | Japan | 14 | (2) |
Medal record
Kawasaki Frontale
| Winner | J1 League | 2017 |
| Winner | J1 League | 2018 |
| Runner-up | J.League Cup | 2017 |
| Runner-up | Emperor's Cup | 2016 |
- * Club domestic league appearances and goals as of 8 August 2026

Yū Kobayashi (小林 悠, Kobayashi Yū; born 23 September 1987) is a Japanese football player currently playing for Kawasaki Frontale and the Japan national team.

== Club statistics ==
As of match played 6 December 2023

| Club performance | | | League | | Cup | | League Cup | | Continental | | Other^{1} | | Total | |
| Season | Club | League | Apps | Goals | Apps | Goals | Apps | Goals | Apps | Goals | Apps | Goals | Apps | Goals |
| Japan | | | League | | Emperor's Cup | | League Cup | | AFC | | | | Total | |
|---|---|---|---|---|---|---|---|---|---|---|---|---|---|---|
| 2008 | Mito HollyHock | J2 League | 5 | 0 | 0 | | – | | – | | – | | 5 | 0 |
| 2010 | Kawasaki; Frontale | J1 League | 6 | 0 | 2 | 2 | 0 | 0 | – | | – | | 8 | 2 |
| 2011 | Kawasaki; Frontale | J1 League | 32 | 12 | 3 | 2 | 4 | 2 | – | | – | | 39 | 16 |
| 2012 | Kawasaki; Frontale | J1 League | 26 | 6 | 3 | 2 | 6 | 2 | – | | – | | 35 | 10 |
| 2013 | Kawasaki; Frontale | J1 League | 23 | 5 | 2 | 0 | 8 | 2 | – | | – | | 33 | 7 |
| 2014 | Kawasaki; Frontale | J1 League | 30 | 12 | 2 | 0 | 2 | 0 | 6 | 3 | – | | 40 | 15 |
| 2015 | Kawasaki; Frontale | J1 League | 18 | 5 | 2 | 0 | 1 | 0 | – | | – | | 21 | 5 |
| 2016 | Kawasaki; Frontale | J1 League | 32 | 15 | 3 | 1 | 2 | 0 | – | | – | | 37 | 16 |
| 2017 | Kawasaki; Frontale | J1 League | 34 | 23 | 2 | 0 | 5 | 0 | 10 | 6 | – | | 51 | 29 |
| 2018 | Kawasaki; Frontale | J1 League | 27 | 15 | 1 | 0 | 0 | 0 | 4 | 0 | 1 | 1 | 33 | 16 |
| 2019 | Kawasaki; Frontale | J1 League | 31 | 13 | 4 | 2 | 1 | 1 | 5 | 1 | 1 | 0 | 42 | 17 |
| 2020 | Kawasaki; Frontale | J1 League | 27 | 14 | 2 | 0 | 5 | 4 | – | | – | | 34 | 18 |
| 2021 | Kawasaki; Frontale | J1 League | 33 | 10 | 4 | 2 | 2 | 0 | 2 | 0 | 1 | 1 | 38 | 13 |
| 2022 | Kawasaki; Frontale | J1 League | 30 | 5 | 1 | 0 | 1 | 0 | 6 | 4 | 1 | 0 | 39 | 9 |
| 2023 | Kawasaki; Frontale | J1 League | 16 | 4 | 2 | 0 | 3 | 0 | 2 | 1 | 1 | 1 | 23 | 5 |
| Career total | | | 370 | 139 | 33 | 11 | 40 | 11 | 32 | 15 | 4 | 2 | 481 | 178 |

^{1}=Japanese Super Cup appearances

== National team statistics ==
Japan national team
| Year | Apps | Goals |
|---|---|---|
| 2014 | 2 | 0 |
| 2015 | 0 | |
| 2016 | 6 | 0 |
| 2017 | 3 | 2 |
| 2018 | 3 | 0 |
| Total | 14 | 2 |

=== International goals ===
Scores and results list Japan's goal tally first.

| No | Date | Venue | Opponent | Score | Result | Competition |
|---|---|---|---|---|---|---|
| 1. | 12 December 2017 | Ajinomoto Stadium, Tokyo, Japan | China | 1–0 | 2–1 | 2017 EAFF E-1 Football Championship |
| 2. | 16 December 2017 | Ajinomoto Stadium, Tokyo, Japan | South Korea | 1–0 | 1–4 | 2017 EAFF E-1 Football Championship |

== Honours ==
=== Club ===
Kawasaki Frontale

- J1 League: 2017, 2018, 2020, 2021
- Emperor's Cup: 2020, 2023
- J.League Cup: 2019
- Japanese Super Cup: 2019, 2021

=== Individual ===
- J.League Player of the Year: 2017
- J.League Top Scorer: 2017
- J.League Best XI: 2016, 2017
