= Yoshito Ōkubo =

Japanese footballer (born 1982)

Yoshito Okubo
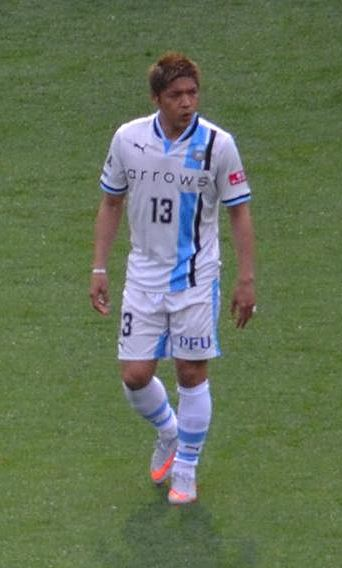
- Okubo in 2016

Personal information
- Date of birth: 9 June 1982 (age 44)
- Place of birth: Kanda, Fukuoka, Japan
- Height: 1.70 m (5 ft 7 in)
- Position: Forward

Youth career
- 1998–2000: Kunimi High School

Senior career*
| Years | Team | Apps | (Gls) |
| 2001–2006 | Cerezo Osaka | 87 | (39) |
| 2005–2006 | → Mallorca (loan) | 39 | (5) |
| 2007–2008 | Vissel Kobe | 62 | (25) |
| 2009 | VfL Wolfsburg | 9 | (0) |
| 2009–2012 | Vissel Kobe | 92 | (25) |
| 2013–2016 | Kawasaki Frontale | 130 | (82) |
| 2017 | FC Tokyo | 28 | (8) |
| 2018 | Kawasaki Frontale | 12 | (2) |
| 2018–2019 | Júbilo Iwata | 37 | (4) |
| 2020 | Tokyo Verdy | 19 | (0) |
| 2021 | Cerezo Osaka | 29 | (6) |
| Total | | 544 | (196) |

International career
| 2004 | Japan U23 | 3 | (2) |
| 2003–2014 | Japan | 60 | (6) |
Medal record
Cerezo Osaka
| Runner-up | Emperor's Cup | 2001 |
| Runner-up | Emperor's Cup | 2003 |
Kawasaki Frontale
| Winner | J1 League | 2018 |
| Runner-up | Emperor's Cup | 2016 |
Representing Japan
Asian Games
| Silver medal – second place | 2002 Busan | Team |
AFC U-19 Championship
| Silver medal – second place | 2000 Iran |
- * Club domestic league appearances and goals

Yoshito Okubo (大久保 嘉人, Ōkubo Yoshito; born 9 June 1982) is a Japanese former professional footballer who played as a forward. He played for the Japan national team, scoring six goals in 60 appearances. He was the J.League Top Scorer and J.League Best XI in 2013, 2014, and 2015.

== Club career ==
Okubo was born in Kanda, Fukuoka on 9 June 1982. After graduating from high school, he joined J1 League club Cerezo Osaka in 2001. He played many matches as forward and offensive midfielder from first season. However Cerezo finished at the bottom place in 2001 season and was relegated to J2 League. In 2002 season, he scored 18 goals which was the second top scorer and Cerezo reached the second place and was returned to J1 in a year. From 2003, he scored more than 15 goals in J1. He was also selected Asian Young Footballer of the Year award in 2003.

In 2005, Okubo moved to La Liga club Mallorca on loan. Although the club results were bad, Mallorca finished at 17th place and remained La Liga in 2004–05 season. Although he played many matches as substitute forward in 2005–06 season, his opportunity to play decreased from April 2006.

In June 2006, Okubo returned to Cerezo Osaka. At then Cerezo won only one of 13 matches and at the bottom place of 18 clubs in 2006 season. Although he played as forward all matches excluding suspension, Cerezo finished at the 17th place and was relegated to J2 again.

In 2007, Okubo moved to J1 club Vissel Kobe. He played many matches as left midfielder in two seasons under manager Hiroshi Matsuda and scored more than ten goals both seasons.

On 3 January 2009, Vissel Kobe announced Okubo's transfer to VfL Wolfsburg of the Bundesliga. After just six months with Wolfsburg, he returned to Vissel Kobe. Upon his return, he became the first Japanese striker to have won the Bundesliga title.

In June 2009, Okubo returned to Japan and re-joined Vissel Kobe. He played as forward all 19 matches and scored 8 goals in 2009 season. Although his opportunity to play decreased for injuries in 2010, he played as regular player until 2012. However Vissel finished at the 16th place in 2012 season and was relegated to J2 League.

After Vissel Kobe was relegated to the J2 League in 2013 season, Okubo transferred to Kawasaki Frontale. An ever-present figure and a regular starting eleven in Kawasaki, he scored 26 goals in his debut season in the Kanagawa Prefecture football club and clinched top scorer of 2013 season. He played more than 30 matches every season and he became a top scorer for 3 years in a row until 2015 season.

At the end of 2016 season and before J.League Championship, Okubo announced he would leave Kawasaki Frontale to sign for FC Tokyo in 2017. He played in one season and scored eight goals.

In 2018, Okubo re-joined Kawasaki Frontale. However he could not as regular player and he mainly played as substitute forward.

In June 2018, Okubo moved to Júbilo Iwata.

== International career ==
In 2003, Okubo was selected Japan national team by manager Zico. He made his international debut on 31 May 2003 in a friendly against South Korea at Tokyo National Stadium when he was sent on to the pitch to replace Takayuki Suzuki. Although he played many matches as forward in 2003, his opportunity to play decreased from 2004 as he struggled to score goals under Zico.

Okubo was also part of the Japan U-23 national team for 2004 Summer Olympics, who exited in the first round, having finished fourth in group B, below group winners Paraguay, Italy and Ghana.

In August 2007, Okubo was selected Japan for the first time in 2 years by manager Ivica Osim. Okubo scored his first international goal on 17 October 2007 in a friendly against Egypt at Osaka Nagai Stadium.

In 2010, Okubo was selected Japan for 2010 World Cup. He played as left midfielder in all 4 matches and Japan qualified to the knockout stage.

Okubo's selection for the 2014 World Cup in Brazil was the big surprise of coach Alberto Zaccheroni's squad announcement. The forward had previously played just once for the coach in four years.

== Career statistics ==
=== Club ===
As of end of 2023 season

Appearances and goals by club, season and competition
| Club | Season | League | | | National cup | | League cup | | Continental | | Other (Note: Includes J.League Championship and Japanese Super Cup.) | | Total | |
| Club | Season | Division | Apps | Goals | Apps | Goals | Apps | Goals | Apps | Goals | Apps | Goals | Apps | Goals |
|---|---|---|---|---|---|---|---|---|---|---|---|---|---|---|
| Cerezo Osaka | 2001 | J1 League | 20 | 2 | 3 | 0 | 1 | 1 | — | | — | | 24 | 3 |
| Cerezo Osaka | 2002 | J2 League | 29 | 18 | 2 | 1 | — | | — | | — | | 31 | 19 |
| Cerezo Osaka | 2003 | J1 League | 24 | 16 | 5 | 4 | 3 | 0 | — | | — | | 32 | 20 |
| Cerezo Osaka | 2004 | J1 League | 22 | 15 | 1 | 0 | 2 | 0 | — | | — | | 25 | 15 |
| Cerezo Osaka | Total | | 95 | 51 | 11 | 5 | 6 | 1 | — | | — | | 112 | 57 |
| Mallorca (loan) | 2004–05 | La Liga | 13 | 3 | — | | — | | — | | — | | 13 | 3 |
| Mallorca (loan) | 2005–06 | La Liga | 26 | 2 | 1 | 1 | — | | — | | — | | 27 | 3 |
| Mallorca (loan) | Total | | 39 | 5 | 1 | 1 | — | | — | | — | | 40 | 6 |
| Cerezo Osaka | 2006 | J1 League | 21 | 6 | 0 | 0 | 0 | 0 | — | | — | | 21 | 6 |
| Vissel Kobe | 2007 | J1 League | 31 | 14 | 2 | 1 | 5 | 0 | — | | — | | 38 | 15 |
| Vissel Kobe | 2008 | J1 League | 31 | 11 | 1 | 1 | — | | — | | — | | 32 | 12 |
| Vissel Kobe | Total | | 62 | 25 | 3 | 2 | 5 | 0 | — | | — | | 70 | 27 |
| VfL Wolfsburg | 2008–09 | Bundesliga | 9 | 0 | 2 | 0 | — | | 2 | 0 | — | | 13 | 0 |
| Vissel Kobe | 2009 | J1 League | 19 | 8 | 1 | 1 | — | | — | | — | | 20 | 9 |
| Vissel Kobe | 2010 | J1 League | 17 | 4 | 1 | 1 | 0 | 0 | — | | — | | 18 | 5 |
| Vissel Kobe | 2011 | J1 League | 30 | 9 | 1 | 0 | 1 | 0 | — | | — | | 32 | 9 |
| Vissel Kobe | 2012 | J1 League | 26 | 4 | 1 | 0 | 3 | 2 | — | | — | | 30 | 6 |
| Vissel Kobe | Total | | 92 | 25 | 4 | 2 | 4 | 2 | — | | — | | 100 | 29 |
| Kawasaki Frontale | 2013 | J1 League | 33 | 26 | 4 | 3 | 8 | 4 | — | | — | | 45 | 33 |
| Kawasaki Frontale | 2014 | J1 League | 32 | 18 | 1 | 0 | 4 | 2 | 8 | 1 | — | | 45 | 21 |
| Kawasaki Frontale | 2015 | J1 League | 32 | 23 | 3 | 2 | 4 | 2 | — | | — | | 39 | 27 |
| Kawasaki Frontale | 2016 | J1 League | 33 | 15 | 6 | 5 | 0 | 0 | — | | 1 | 0 | 40 | 20 |
| Kawasaki Frontale | Total | | 130 | 82 | 14 | 10 | 16 | 8 | 8 | 1 | 1 | 0 | 169 | 101 |
| FC Tokyo | 2017 | J1 League | 28 | 8 | 0 | 0 | 2 | 1 | — | | — | | 30 | 9 |
| Kawasaki Frontale | 2018 | J1 League | 12 | 2 | 0 | 0 | 0 | 0 | 4 | 0 | 1 | 1 | 17 | 3 |
| Júbilo Iwata | 2018 | J1 League | 17 | 3 | 1 | 0 | 0 | 0 | — | | 1 | 0 | 19 | 3 |
| Júbilo Iwata | 2019 | J1 League | 20 | 1 | 2 | 0 | 0 | 0 | — | | — | | 22 | 1 |
| Júbilo Iwata | Total | | 37 | 4 | 3 | 0 | 0 | 0 | — | | 1 | 0 | 41 | 4 |
| Tokyo Verdy | 2020 | J2 League | 19 | 0 | — | | — | | — | | — | | 19 | 0 |
| Cerezo Osaka | 2021 | J1 League | 29 | 6 | 2 | 1 | 5 | 0 | 6 | 1 | — | | 42 | 8 |
| Career total | | | 573 | 214 | 40 | 21 | 38 | 12 | 20 | 2 | 3 | 1 | 674 | 250 |

=== International ===
Appearances and goals by national team and year
| National team | Year | Apps | Goals |
|---|---|---|---|
| Japan | 2003 | 14 | 0 |
| Japan | 2004 | 3 | 0 |
| Japan | 2005 | 2 | 0 |
| Japan | 2006 | 0 | 0 |
| Japan | 2007 | 2 | 2 |
| Japan | 2008 | 12 | 3 |
| Japan | 2009 | 9 | 0 |
| Japan | 2010 | 11 | 0 |
| Japan | 2011 | 0 | 0 |
| Japan | 2012 | 1 | 0 |
| Japan | 2013 | 0 | 0 |
| Japan | 2014 | 6 | 1 |
| Total | | 60 | 6 |

Scores and results list Japan's goal tally first, score column indicates score after each Ōkubo goal.

List of international goals scored by Yoshito Ōkubo
| No. | Date | Venue | Opponent | Score | Result | Competition |
|---|---|---|---|---|---|---|
| 1 | 17 October 2007 | Osaka, Japan | Egypt | | 4–1 | 2007 Afro-Asian Cup of Nations |
| 2 | 17 October 2007 | Osaka, Japan | Egypt | | 4–1 | 2007 Afro-Asian Cup of Nations |
| 3 | 6 February 2008 | Saitama, Japan | Thailand | | 4–1 | 2010 FIFA World Cup qualification |
| 4 | 2 June 2008 | Yokohama, Japan | Oman | | 3–0 | 2010 FIFA World Cup qualification |
| 5 | 13 November 2008 | Kobe, Japan | Syria | | 3–1 | Friendly |
| 6 | 6 June 2014 | Florida, United States | Zambia | | 4–3 | Friendly |

== Honours ==
VfL Wolfsburg

- Bundesliga: 2008–09

Individual

- Asian Young Footballer of the Year: 2003
- J.League Top Scorer: 2013, 2014, 2015
- J.League Best XI: 2013, 2014, 2015
