= Tatsuya Hasegawa =

Japanese footballer (born 1994)

Tatsuya Hasegawa 長谷川 竜也
Personal information
- Full name: Tatsuya Hasegawa
- Date of birth: March 7, 1994 (age 32)
- Place of birth: Numazu, Shizuoka, Japan
- Height: 1.64 m (5 ft 4 1/2 in)
- Position: Midfielder

Team information
- Current team: Hokkaido Consadole Sapporo
- Number: 16

Youth career
- –2005: Kadoike SSS
- 2006–2008: Shizuoka Gakuen Junior High School
- 2009–2011: Shizuoka Gakuen High School

College career
Years	Team	Apps	(Gls)
2012–2015	Juntendo University		

Senior career*
Years	Team	Apps	(Gls)
2016–2021	Kawasaki Frontale	96	(15)
2022–2023	Yokohama FC	48	(4)
2023	→ Tokyo Verdy (loan)	9	(1)
2024–	Hokkaido Consadole Sapporo	62	(1)
Medal record
Kawasaki Frontale
Winner	J1 League	2017
Winner	J1 League	2018
Runner-up	J.League Cup	2017
Runner-up	Emperor's Cup	2016
Yokohama FC
Runner-up	J2 League	2022
- * Club domestic league appearances and goals as of 13 August 2026

Tatsuya Hasegawa (長谷川 竜也, Hasegawa Tatsuya; born March 7, 1994) is a Japanese professional footballer who plays as a midfielder for J1 League club Hokkaido Consadole Sapporo.

== Career ==
=== Kawasaki Frontale ===
After graduating in 2015, Hasegawa began his professional career with J1 club Kawasaki Frontale in 2016. He made his league debut against Sagan Tosu on 13 August 2016. Hasegawa scored his first league goal against Gamba Osaka on 3 November 2016, scoring in the 6th minute. He scored against Vegalta Sendai on 8 October 2017, scoring in the 90th minute to help take Kawasaki Frontale to the final of the J.League Cup. During an AFC Champions League match against Sydney FC on 13 March 2019, Hasegawa was noted for his chances on the left. He contributed for the club through a successful period, including winning 4 J1 League titles.

=== Yokohama FC ===
In 2022, Hasegawa was announced at Yokohama FC. He was also appointed as club captain during the season. Later that year on 23 October 2022, he helped Fulie gained automatic promotion back to J1 League for the 2023 season as runners-up.

Hasegawa was selected as one of the players for the 2022 J2 League Best XI award.

On 12 December 2023, the club announced it would not be renewing Hasegawa's contract for the 2024 season.

=== Loan to Tokyo Verdy ===
On 16 August 2023, it was announced that Hasegawa signed with J2 League club Tokyo Verdy, on loan until 31 January 2024. On 12 December 2023, it was announced that his loan would expire at the end of the 2023 season.

=== Hokkaido Consadole Sapporo ===
On 12 January 2024, Hasegawa was announced at Hokkaido Consadole Sapporo.

== Career statistics ==
As of the end 2022 season.

=== Club ===
Appearances and goals by club, season and competition
Club	Season	League			Cup		League Cup		Continental		Other		Total	
Club	Season	Division	Apps	Goals	Apps	Goals	Apps	Goals	Apps	Goals	Apps	Goals	Apps	Goals
Japan			League		Emperor's Cup		J.League Cup		AFC		Other		Total	
Kawasaki Frontale	2016	J1 League	2	1	2	0	4	0	–		1 (Note: Appearance in the J. League Championship)	0	9	1
Kawasaki Frontale	2017	J1 League	24	5	3	1	4	1	4	2	–		35	9
Kawasaki Frontale	2018	J1 League	12	1	4	1	2	0	5	1	1 (Note: Appearances in the Japanese Super Cup)	0	24	3
Kawasaki Frontale	2019	J1 League	25	5	1	0	5	0	5	0	–		36	5
Kawasaki Frontale	2020	J1 League	12	3	2	0	1	2	–		–		15	5
Kawasaki Frontale	2021	J1 League	21	0	3	0	1	0	4	2	1	0	30	2
Kawasaki Frontale	Total		96	15	15	2	17	3	18	5	3	0	149	25
Yokohama FC	2022	J2 League	38	4	0	0	–		–		–		38	4
Yokohama FC	2023	J1 League	0	0	0	0	0	0	–		–		0	0
Career total			134	19	15	2	17	3	18	5	3	0	187	29

== Honours ==
=== Club ===
- J1 League (4) : 2017, 2018, 2020, 2021
- Emperor's Cup (1) : 2020
- J.League Cup (1) : 2019
- Japanese Super Cup (1) : 2021

=== Individual ===
- J2 League Best XI: 2022
