= Kazuaki Mawatari =

Japanese footballer

Kazuaki Mawatari 馬渡 和彰
Personal information
- Full name: Kazuaki Mawatari
- Date of birth: 23 June 1991 (age 35)
- Place of birth: Tokyo, Japan
- Height: 1.75 m (5 ft 9 in)
- Position: Full back

Team information
- Current team: Matsumoto Yamaga
- Number: 7

Youth career
- 1999–2003: Mishuku SSS
- 2004–2006: Mishuku Junior High School
- 2007–2009: Ichiritsu Funabashi High School

College career
Years	Team	Apps	(Gls)
2010–2013	Toyo University		

Senior career*
Years	Team	Apps	(Gls)
2014–2015	Gainare Tottori	52	(7)
2016	Zweigen Kanazawa	15	(1)
2017	Tokushima Vortis	39	(4)
2018	Sanfrecce Hiroshima	4	(1)
2019–2020	Kawasaki Frontale	13	(1)
2020	→ Shonan Bellmare (loan)	7	(0)
2021–2022	Omiya Ardija	41	(2)
2022–2023	Urawa Red Diamonds	19	(1)
2024–2025	Matsumoto Yamaga	32	(1)
Medal record
Sanfrecce Hiroshima
Runner-up	J1 League	2018
- * Club domestic league appearances and goals as of 17:38, 15 March 2023 (UTC)

Kazuaki Mawatari (馬渡 和彰, Mawatari, Kazuaki; born 23 June 1991 in Tokyo) is a Japanese footballer who plays as a full back for J3 League club Matsumoto Yamaga.

He has played Since 2014 and has scored 17 goals.

He is ranked #23 of 25 in Urawa Red Diamonds.

== Club statistics ==
As of 15 March 2025.

Appearances and goals by club, season and competition
Club	Season	League			Cup		League Cup		Other		Total	
Club	Season	Division	Apps	Goals	Apps	Goals	Apps	Goals	Apps	Goals	Apps	Goals
Japan			League		Emperor's Cup		J.League Cup		Other		Total	
Gainare Tottori	2014	J3 League	21	5	2	1	–	–	–	–	23	6
Gainare Tottori	2015	J3 League	31	2	2	0	–	–	–	–	33	2
Gainare Tottori	Total		52	7	4	1	0	0	0	0	56	8
Zweigen Kanazawa	2016	J2 League	15	1	2	0	–	–	2	0	19	1
Tokushima Vortis	2017	J2 League	39	4	1	0	–	–	–	–	40	4
Sanfrecce Hiroshima	2018	J1 League	4	1	3	0	6	0	–	–	13	1
Kawasaki Frontale	2019	J1 League	13	1	2	0	3	0	4	0	22	1
Shonan Bellmare (loan)	2020	J1 League	7	0	0	0	3	0	–	–	10	0
Omiya Ardija	2021	J2 League	41	2	0	0	–	–	–	–	41	2
Urawa Red Diamonds	2022	J1 League	19	1	1	0	2	0	7	1	29	2
Urawa Red Diamonds	2023	J1 League	3	0	0	0	1	0	–	–	4	0
Matsumoto Yamaga FC	2024	J3 League	18	0	–	–	–	–	–	–	18	0
Matsumoto Yamaga FC	2025	J3 League	14	1	–	–	–	–	–	–	14	1
Career total			224	17	13	1	15	0	13	1	265	19

== Honors ==
=== Club ===
Kawasaki Frontale

- Japanese Super Cup: 2019

Urawa Red Diamonds

- Japanese Super Cup: 2022
- AFC Champions League: 2022
