= Kei Chinen =

Japanese football player

Kei Chinen 知念 慶
Personal information
- Full name: Kei Chinen
- Date of birth: 17 March 1995 (age 31)
- Place of birth: Haebaru, Okinawa, Japan
- Height: 1.77 m (5 ft 10 in)
- Position: Defensive midfielder

Team information
- Current team: Yokohama F. Marinos
- Number: 14

Youth career
- Kitaoka FC
- 2007–2009: Haebaru Junior High School
- 2010–2012: Chinen High School

College career
Years	Team	Apps	(Gls)
2013–2016	Aichi Gakuin University		

Senior career*
Years	Team	Apps	(Gls)
2017–2022	Kawasaki Frontale	101	(21)
2020	→ Oita Trinita (loan)	29	(3)
2023–2026	Kashima Antlers	99	(13)
2026–	Yokohama F. Marinos	0	(0)
- * Club domestic league appearances and goals as of 21:57, 3 August 2026 (UTC)

Kei Chinen (知念 慶, Chinen Kei; born March 17, 1995) is a Japanese professional footballer who plays as a midfielder for J1 League club Yokohama F. Marinos.

== Career ==
Kei Chinen joined J1 League club Kawasaki Frontale in 2017.

In 2020, he was loaned to Kyushu club, Oita Trinita.

In 2023, Chinen joined Kashima Antlers. On 18 February 2023, Chinen made his debut for Kashima in a 2–0 victory over Kyoto Sanga and scored his first goal for the club in the 34th minute.

In June 2026, it was announced that Chinen would be joining Yokohama F. Marinos ahead of the 2026–27 J1 League season.

== Career statistics ==
=== Club ===
As of 3 August 2026.

Appearances and goals by club, season and competition
Club	Season	League			National cup (Note: Includes Emperors Cup)		League cup (Note: Includes J.League Cup)		Continental		Other		Total	
Club	Season	Division	Apps	Goals	Apps	Goals	Apps	Goals	Apps	Goals	Apps	Goals	Apps	Goals
Kawasaki Frontale	2017	J1 League	4	1	3	0	2	1	0	0	0	0	9	2
Kawasaki Frontale	2018	J1 League	27	4	4	3	2	1	5 (Note: Appearances in AFC Champions League Elite)	2	1 (Note: Appearance in Japanese Super Cup)	0	39	10
Kawasaki Frontale	2019	J1 League	21	5	3	0	1	1	4	1	1	0	30	7
Kawasaki Frontale	2021	J1 League	22	4	3	0	1	0	4	4	0	0	30	8
Kawasaki Frontale	2022	J1 League	27	7	1	1	0	0	6	3	1	0	35	11
Kawasaki Frontale	Total		101	21	14	4	6	3	19	10	3	0	143	38
Oita Trinita (loan)	2020	J1 League	29	3	–		1	0	–		–		30	3
Kashima Antlers	2023	J1 League	21	5	0	0	4	0	–		–		25	5
Kashima Antlers	2024	J1 League	33	3	3	0	1	1	–		–		37	4
Kashima Antlers	2025	J1 League	29	4	3	1	0	0	–		–		32	5
Kashima Antlers	2026	J1 (100)	16	1	0	0	0	0	–		–		16	1
Kashima Antlers	Total		99	13	6	1	5	1	0	0	0	0	110	15
Yokohama F. Marinos	2026–27	J1 League	0	0	0	0	0	0	–		–		0	0
Career total			229	37	20	5	12	4	19	10	3	0	283	56

== Honours ==
=== Club ===
Kawasaki Frontale

- J1 League: 2017, 2018, 2020, 2021
- Japanese Super Cup: 2019

Kashima Antlers

- J1 League: 2025

=== Individual ===
- J.League Best XI: 2024
