= Akihiro Ienaga =

Japanese footballer (born 1986)

Akihiro Ienaga 家長 昭博
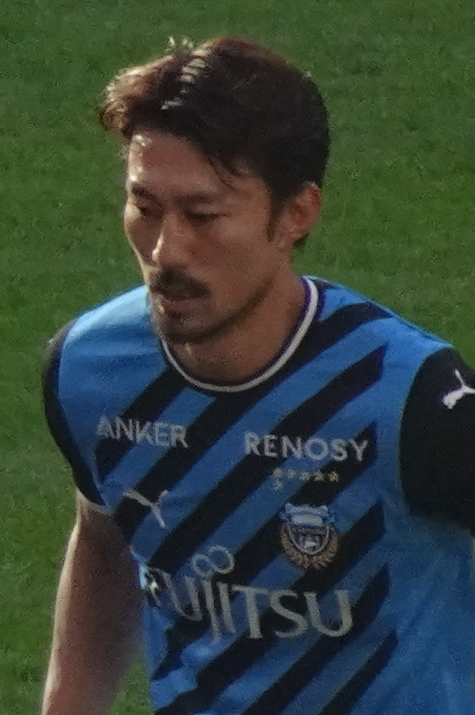
- Akihiro Ienaga playing for Kawasaki Frontale in 2023.

Personal information
- Full name: Akihiro Ienaga
- Date of birth: June 13, 1986 (age 40)
- Place of birth: Nagaokakyō, Kyoto, Japan
- Height: 1.73 m (5 ft 8 in)
- Position: Winger

Team information
- Current team: Kawasaki Frontale
- Number: 41

Youth career
- 1993–1998: Nagaokakyo SS
- 1999–2004: Gamba Osaka

Senior career*
Years	Team	Apps	(Gls)
2004–2007	Gamba Osaka	87	(5)
2008–2009	Oita Trinita	30	(1)
2010	Cerezo Osaka	31	(4)
2011–2013	Mallorca	25	(2)
2012	→ Ulsan Hyundai (loan)	12	(1)
2012–2013	→ Gamba Osaka (loan)	29	(6)
2014–2016	Omiya Ardija	92	(28)
2017–	Kawasaki Frontale	286	(49)

International career
2005	Japan U-20	4	(0)
2006–2007	Japan U-23	10	(1)
2007–2011	Japan	3	(0)
Medal record
Gamba Osaka
Winner	J1 League	2005
Winner	J.League Cup	2007
Runner-up	J.League Cup	2005
Runner-up	Emperor's Cup	2006
Runner-up	Emperor's Cup	2012
Oita Trinita
Winner	J.League Cup	2008
Kawasaki Frontale
Winner	J1 League	2017
Winner	J1 League	2018
Winner	J1 League	2020
Winner	J1 League	2021
Runner-up	J1 League	2022
Runner-up	J.League Cup	2017
Winner	J.League Cup	2019
Winner	Emperor's Cup	2020
Winner	Emperor's Cup	2023
- * Club domestic league appearances and goals as of 1 August 2026

Akihiro Ienaga (家長 昭博, Ienaga Akihiro; born 13 June 1986) is a Japanese professional footballer who plays as a winger for Kawasaki Frontale. He also formerly played for the Japan national team.

== Club career ==
Born in Hyogo Prefecture, Ienaga began his career as a trainee with Gamba Osaka, one of the leading clubs in Japan's J1 League. He broke into the senior squad in 2004 and helped the club to their first J1 League title the following year. Ienaga joined J1 League rivals Oita Trinita on a season-long loan in 2007. In December 2008, Ienaga joined English club, Plymouth Argyle, on trial. Plymouth attempted to sign the player in January 2009 but he was denied a work permit so they were forced to withdraw from talks. In December 2010, he signed with Spanish Primera Division club RCD Mallorca in a five-year deal. And scored his first goal for the club in home game against Sevilla on 9 April 2011.

== International career ==
In June 2005, Ienaga was selected Japan U-20 national team for 2005 World Youth Championship. At this tournament, he played all 4 matches as left midfielder.

Ienaga made his international debut as a substitute in Japan's 2–0 win against Peru in March 2007.

== Career statistics ==
=== Club ===
As of match played 3 November 2025

Club	Season	League		Cup		League Cup		Continental		Other^{1}		Total	
Club	Season	Apps	Goals	Apps	Goals	Apps	Goals	Apps	Goals	Apps	Goals	Apps	Goals
Gamba Osaka	2004	8	1	2	0	3	0	-		-		13	1
Gamba Osaka	2005	24	0	3	0	5	1	-		-		32	1
Gamba Osaka	2006	28	2	4	2	2	0	6	1	3	0	43	5
Gamba Osaka	2007	27	2	3	0	7	1	-		-		37	3
Gamba Osaka	Total	87	5	12	2	17	2	6	1	3	0	125	10
Oita Trinita	2008	4	0	1	0	0	0	-		-		5	0
Oita Trinita	2009	26	1	1	0	6	2	-		3	0	36	3
Oita Trinita	Total	30	1	2	0	6	2	-		3	0	41	3
Cerezo Osaka	2010	31	4	3	0	6	0	-		-		40	4
Cerezo Osaka	Total	31	4	3	0	6	0	-		-		40	4
Mallorca	2010–11	14	2	-		-		-		-		14	2
Mallorca	2011–12	4	0	1	0	-		-		-		5	0
Mallorca	2013–14	7	0	1	0	-		-		-		8	0
Mallorca	Total	25	2	2	0	-		-		-		27	2
Ulsan Hyundai	2012	12	1	1	0	0	0	5	0	0	0	18	1
Ulsan Hyundai	Total	12	1	1	0	0	0	5	0	0	0	18	1
Gamba Osaka	2012	12	5	3	1	1	0	0	0	0	0	16	6
Gamba Osaka	2013	17	1	0	0	-		-		-		17	1
Gamba Osaka	Total	29	6	3	1	1	0	0	0	0	0	33	7
Omiya Ardija	2014	33	6	5	0	1	0	-		-		39	6
Omiya Ardija	2015	33	11	0	0	-		-		-		33	11
Omiya Ardija	2016	26	11	3	1	2	1	-		-		31	13
Omiya Ardija	Total	92	28	8	1	3	1	0	0	0	0	103	30
Kawasaki Frontale	2017	21	2	3	1	5	2	6	0	-		35	5
Kawasaki Frontale	2018	32	6	3	1	1	0	4	1	1	0	41	8
Kawasaki Frontale	2019	26	0	1	1	5	0	4	0	1	0	37	1
Kawasaki Frontale	2020	29	11	2	0	3	1	-		-		34	12
Kawasaki Frontale	2021	37	8	5	1	2	1	6	0	1	0	51	10
Kawasaki Frontale	2022	34	12	1	0	2	0	4	0	1	0	42	12
Kawasaki Frontale	2023	33	2	4	0	4	0	0	0	0	0	41	2
Kawasaki Frontale	2024	36	7	2	0	4	0	7	2	0	0	49	9
Kawasaki Frontale	2025	26	1	2	0	1	0	11	2	0	0	40	3
Kawasaki Frontale	Total	274	49	23	4	21	4	42	5	1	0	370	62
Career total		580	96	54	8	57	9	53	6	10	0	757	119

^{1}Includes other competitive competitions, including the Japanese Super Cup, A3 Champions Cup, Suruga Bank Championship and Pan-Pacific Championship.

== International ==
National team	Year	Apps	Goals
Japan U-20
Japan U-20	2005	4	0
Japan U-20	Total	4	0
Japan U-23
Japan U-23	2006	1	0
Japan U-23	2007	9	1
Japan U-23	Total	10	1
Japan
Japan	2007	1	0
Japan	2008	0	0
Japan	2009	0	0
Japan	2010	0	0
Japan	2011	2	0
Japan	Total	3	0

=== International goals ===
Scores and results list Japan's goal tally first.

==== Under-23 ====
#	Date	Venue	Opponent	Score	Result	Competition
1.	28 March 2007	National Stadium, Tokyo, Japan	Syria	1–0	3–0	2008 Summer Olympics qualification

=== Appearances in major competitions ===
Team	Competition	Category	Appearances		Goals	Team Result
Team	Competition	Category	Start	Sub	Goals	Team Result
Japan U-20	2005 FIFA World Youth Championship	U-20	4	0	0	Round of 16
Japan U-23	2008 Summer Olympics qualification	U-22	6	3	1	Qualified

== Awards and honours ==
=== Club ===
Gamba Osaka

- J1 League: 2005
- J.League Cup: 2007
- Japanese Super Cup: 2007

Oita Trinita

- J.League Cup: 2008

Omiya Ardija

- J2 League: 2015

Kawasaki Frontale

- J1 League: 2017, 2018, 2020, 2021
- Emperor's Cup: 2020, 2023
- J.League Cup: 2019
- Japanese Super Cup: 2019, 2021, 2024

=== International ===
Japan

- Kirin Cup: 2011

=== Individual ===
- J.League MVP Award: 2018
- J.League Best XI: 2018, 2020, 2021, 2022
