= Manabu Saitō =

Japanese footballer (born 1990)

Personal information
- Date of birth: 4 April 1990 (age 36)
- Place of birth: Kawasaki, Kanagawa, Japan
- Height: 1.69 m (5 ft 7 in)
- Position: Winger

Team information
- Current team: Azul Claro Numazu
- Number: 7

Youth career
- 2003–2008: Yokohama F. Marinos

Senior career*
Years	Team	Apps	(Gls)
2008–2017	Yokohama F. Marinos	201	(32)
2011	→ Ehime FC (loan)	36	(14)
2018–2021	Kawasaki Frontale	57	(4)
2021–2022	Nagoya Grampus	27	(0)
2022	Suwon Samsung Bluewings	19	(1)
2023	Newcastle Jets	8	(1)
2023	Vegalta Sendai	12	(0)
2024–	Azul Claro Numazu	60	(3)

International career^{‡}
2007	Japan U17	2	(0)
2012	Japan U23	14	(2)
2013–2016	Japan	6	(1)
Medal record
Yokohama F. Marinos
Runner-up	J1 League	2013
Winner	Emperor's Cup	2013
Runner-up	Emperor's Cup	2017
Kawasaki Frontale
Winner	J1 League	2018
Representing Japan
AFC U-16 Championship
Gold medal – first place	2006 Singapore
- * Club domestic league appearances and goals as of 30 January 2026 ‡ National team caps and goals as of 10 June 2014

Manabu Saitō (齋藤 学, Saitō Manabu; born 4 April 1990) is a Japanese professional footballer who plays as a winger for Japan Football League club Azul Claro Numazu. He spent the majority of his career with Yokohama F. Marinos.

== International career ==
Saito was born in Kanagawa. In August 2007, he was elected Japan U17 national team for 2007 FIFA U-17 World Cup. He played two matches. In July 2012, he was selected for the Japan U23 national team squad for the 2012 Summer Olympics. He played four matches and Japan won the 4th place.

In July 2013, Saito was elected Japan national team for 2013 East Asian Cup. At this tournament, on 21 July, he debuted against China. He was also called-up for the 2014 FIFA World Cup, but he did not play. He played six games and scored one goal for Japan until 2016.

== Career statistics ==
=== Club ===
As of 7 March 2024

Appearances and goals by club, season and competition
Club	Season	League			National Cup		League Cup		Continental		Other		Total	
Club	Season	Division	Apps	Goals	Apps	Goals	Apps	Goals	Apps	Goals	Apps	Goals	Apps	Goals
Yokohama F. Marinos	2008	J1 League	7	0	1	0	0	0	–		–		8	0
Yokohama F. Marinos	2009	J1 League	11	0	0	0	3	0	–		–		14	0
Yokohama F. Marinos	2010	J1 League	5	0	0	0	5	1	–		–		10	1
Yokohama F. Marinos	2012	J1 League	29	6	3	0	5	2	–		–		37	8
Yokohama F. Marinos	2013	J1 League	28	4	4	2	4	2	–		–		39	8
Yokohama F. Marinos	2014	J1 League	31	4	2	0	1	0	5	3	–		39	7
Yokohama F. Marinos	2015	J1 League	32	7	2	0	3	0	–		–		37	7
Yokohama F. Marinos	2016	J1 League	33	10	4	1	4	1	–		–		41	12
Yokohama F. Marinos	2017	J1 League	25	1	2	2	2	0	–		–		29	3
Yokohama F. Marinos	Total		201	32	18	5	30	6	5	3	0	0	254	46
Ehime FC (loan)	2011	J2 League	36	14	2	0	–		–		–		38	14
Kawasaki Frontale	2018	J1 League	16	1	3	1	2	0	1	0	0	0	22	2
Kawasaki Frontale	2019	J1 League	16	2	2	0	0	0	4	1	1	0	23	3
Kawasaki Frontale	2020	J1 League	25	1	0	0	2	1	–		–		27	2
Kawasaki Frontale	Total		57	4	5	1	4	1	5	1	1	0	72	7
Nagoya Grampus	2021	J1 League	24	0	2	0	1	0	6	1	–		33	1
Nagoya Grampus	2022	J1 League	3	0	1	0	6	1	–		–		10	1
Nagoya Grampus	Total		27	0	3	0	7	1	6	1	0	0	43	1
Suwon Samsung Bluewings	2022	K League 1	18	1	0	0	–		–		1	0	19	1
Newcastle Jets	2022–23	A-League Men	8	1	0	0	–		–		–		8	1
Vegalta Sendai	2023	J2 League	12	0	0	0	–		–		–		12	0
Azul Claro Numazu	2024	J3 League	0	0	0	0	1	0	–		–		1	0
Career total			359	52	28	6	42	8	16	5	2	0	447	70

=== International ===
Appearances and goals by national team and year
National team	Year	Apps	Goals
Japan	2013	3	1
Japan	2014	2	0
Japan	2015	0	0
Japan	2016	1	0
Total		6	1

Scores and results list Japan's goal tally first, score column indicates score after each Saitō goal.

List of international goals scored by Manabu Saitō
No.	Date	Venue	Opponent	Score	Result	Competition
1	25 July 2013	Hwaseong Stadium, Hwaseong, South Korea	Australia	1–0	3–2	2013 EAFF East Asian Cup

== Honours ==
Yokohama F. Marinos

- Emperor's Cup: 2013

Kawasaki Frontale

- J1 League: 2018, 2020
- Japanese Super Cup: 2019

Nagoya Grampus

- J.League Cup: 2021

Japan

- AFC U-17 Championship: 2006
- EAFF East Asian Cup: 2013

Individual

- J. League Best Eleven : 2016
