= Kyōhei Noborizato =

Japanese footballer

Kyohei Noborizato 登里 享平
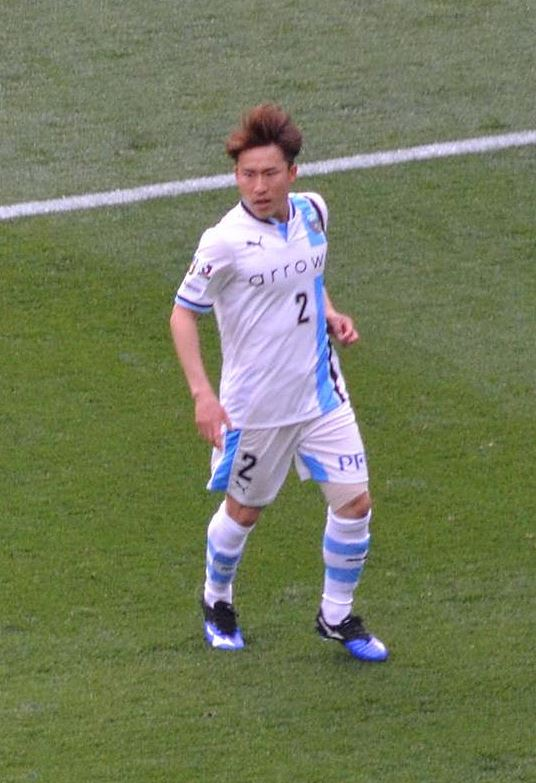
- Noborizato in April 2016

Personal information
- Full name: Kyohei Noborizato
- Date of birth: 13 November 1990 (age 35)
- Place of birth: Higashiōsaka, Osaka, Japan
- Height: 1.68 m (5 ft 6 in)
- Position: Left back

Team information
- Current team: Cerezo Osaka

Youth career
- Kusaka SS
- –2005: EXE '90 FC
- 2006–2008: Kagawa Nishi High School

Senior career*
Years	Team	Apps	(Gls)
2009–2023	Kawasaki Frontale	280	(9)
2024–	Cerezo Osaka	39	(1)
Medal record
Representing Japan
Asian Games
Gold medal – first place	2010 Guangzhou	Team
- * Club domestic league appearances and goals as of 10 August 2026

Kyohei Noborizato (登里 享平, Noborizato Kyōhei; born 13 November 1990) is a Japanese footballer who plays as a left back for Cerezo Osaka.

== Career statistics ==
=== Club ===
As of 5 November 2022

Club performance			League		Cup		League Cup		Continental		Other		Total	
Club	Season	League	Apps	Goals	Apps	Goals	Apps	Goals	Apps	Goals	Apps	Goals	Apps	Goals
Japan			League		Emperor's Cup		J.League Cup		AFC		Other		Total	
Kawasaki Frontale	2009	J1 League	2	1	2	0	1	0	-		-		5	1
Kawasaki Frontale	2010	J1 League	9	0	1	0	-		6	0	-		16	0
Kawasaki Frontale	2011	J1 League	19	2	2	0	3	1	-		-		24	3
Kawasaki Frontale	2012	J1 League	16	2	3	0	4	0	-		-		23	2
Kawasaki Frontale	2013	J1 League	29	0	3	0	7	0	-		-		39	0
Kawasaki Frontale	2014	J1 League	19	1	0	0	3	0	3	0	-		25	1
Kawasaki Frontale	2015	J1 League	1	0	-		-		-		-		1	0
Kawasaki Frontale	2016	J1 League	15	0	4	0	2	0	-		-		21	0
Kawasaki Frontale	2017	J1 League	23	1	2	0	2	0	4	0	-		31	1
Kawasaki Frontale	2018	J1 League	25	0	4	0	2	0	5	1	-		36	1
Kawasaki Frontale	2019	J1 League	27	0	1	0	3	0	5	0	-		36	0
Kawasaki Frontale	2020	J1 League	29	0	-		4	0	-		-		33	0
Kawasaki Frontale	2021	J1 League	29	0	4	0	2	0	3	0	-		38	0
Kawasaki Frontale	2022	J1 League	12	0	0	0	1	0	0	0	1 (Note: Japanese Super Cup)	0	14	0
Total			255	7	26	0	34	1	26	1	1	0	342	9

== Honours ==
=== Japan ===
- Asian Games (1) : 2010

=== Club ===
Kawasaki Frontale

- J1 League (4) : 2017, 2018, 2020, 2021
- Emperor's Cup (2) : 2020, 2023
- J.League Cup (1) : 2019
- Japanese Super Cup (1) : 2019

=== Individual ===
- J.League Best XI (1) : 2020
