= Tatsuki Nara =

Japanese footballer

Tatsuki Nara 奈良 竜樹
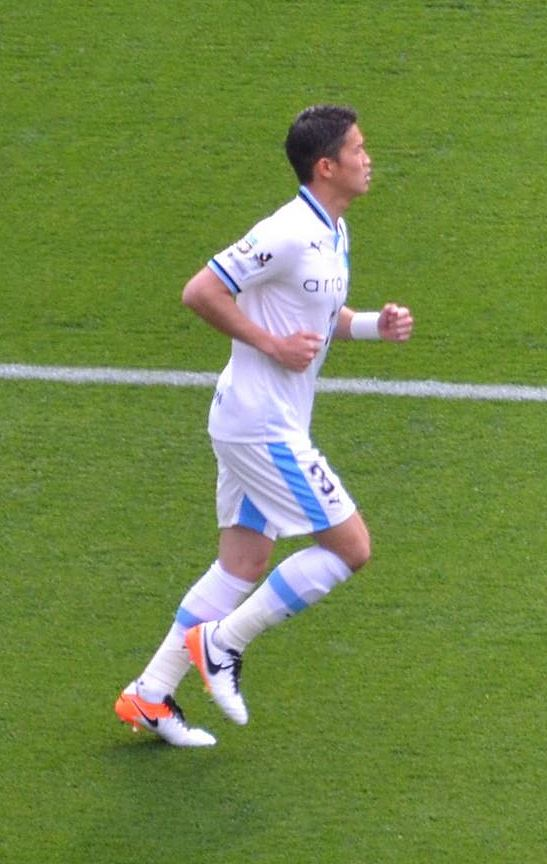
- Nara in April 2016

Personal information
- Full name: Tatsuki Nara
- Date of birth: 19 September 1993 (age 33)
- Place of birth: Kitami, Hokkaidō, Japan
- Height: 1.80 m (5 ft 11 in)
- Position: Defender

Team information
- Current team: Macarthur FC
- Number: 3

Youth career
- Kitami Blue Thunders
- Koizumi Junior High School
- 2009–2011: Consadole Sapporo

Senior career*
Years	Team	Apps	(Gls)
2011–2015	Consadole Sapporo	103	(1)
2015	→ FC Tokyo (loan)	0	(0)
2015	→ J. League U-22 (loan)	7	(1)
2016–2019	Kawasaki Frontale	71	(2)
2020	Kashima Antlers	6	(0)
2021	→ Avispa Fukuoka (loan)	24	(1)
2022–	Avispa Fukuoka	86	(0)
2026–	→ Macarthur FC (loan)	0	(0)

International career
2012	Japan U19	1	(0)
Medal record
Representing Japan
AFC U-23 Championship
Gold medal – first place	2016 Qatar
- * Club domestic league appearances and goals as of 22:03, 7 August 2026 (UTC)

Tatsuki Nara (奈良 竜樹, Nara Tatsuki) (born 19 September 1993) is a Japanese professional footballer who plays as a centre-back for A-League Men club Macarthur FC, on loan from Avispa Fukuoka.

== Career ==
On 10 March 2012, he played against Júbilo Iwata, making him the first player born after the J.League opening day on May 15, 1993 to make a J.League appearance.

On 28 December 2014, Nara was announced at FC Tokyo on loan.

On 1 January 2016, Nara was announced at Kawasaki Frontale. On 14 May 2016, he broke his tibia, meaning that he would be out for 4 months. This meant that he would miss the 2016 Summer Olympics, so he worked on trying to come back in two months, rather than four. He was not able to recover in time, and returned to playing in September 2016. However, in October 2016, he injured his tibia again, and was out for the rest of the season.

On 4 January 2020, Nara was announced at Kashima Antlers.

On 18 January 2021, Nara joined Avispa Fukuoka on loan.

On 17 December 2021, Nara was announced on a permanent transfer at Avispa Fukuoka.

In September 2026, it was announced that Nara would be joining A-League Men club Macarthur FC on loan for the 2026–27 season.

== International career ==
Nara was called up to the Japan U22 squad for the 2013 AFC U-22 Championship.

Nara was called up to the Japan U23 squad for the 2016 AFC U-23 Championship. Japan won the tournament, which qualified them for the 2016 Summer Olympics.

== Club career statistics ==
As of 7 August 2026.

Appearances and goals by club, season and competition
Club	Season	League			National cup (Note: Includes Emperors Cup)		League cup (Note: Includes J.League Cup)		Continental		Other		Total	
Club	Season	Division	Apps	Goals	Apps	Goals	Apps	Goals	Apps	Goals	Apps	Goals	Apps	Goals
Hokkaido Consadole Sapporo	2011	J.League Division 2	7	0	1	0	0	0	–		–		8	0
Hokkaido Consadole Sapporo	2012	J.League Division 1	22	1	1	0	3	0	–		–		26	1
Hokkaido Consadole Sapporo	2013	J.League Division 2	35	0	2	0	0	0	–		–		37	0
Hokkaido Consadole Sapporo	2014	J.League Division 2	39	0	1	0	0	0	–		–		40	0
Hokkaido Consadole Sapporo	Total		103	1	5	0	3	0	0	0	0	0	111	1
FC Tokyo (loan)	2015	J1 League	0	0	1	0	2	0	–		–		3	0
J.League U-22 Selection (loan)	2015	J3 League	7	1	–		–		–		–		7	1
Kawasaki Frontale	2016	J1 League	12	0	1	0	2	0	0	0	0	0	15	0
Kawasaki Frontale	2017	J1 League	27	1	4	0	4	1	9 (Note: Appearances in AFC Champions League Elite)	2	0	0	44	4
Kawasaki Frontale	2018	J1 League	23	1	2	0	2	0	4	0	1 (Note: Appearance in Japanese Super Cup)	0	32	1
Kawasaki Frontale	2019	J1 League	9	0	0	0	0	0	4	0	1	0	14	0
Kawasaki Frontale	Total		71	2	7	0	8	1	17	2	2	0	105	5
Kashima Antlers	2020	J1 League	6	0	–		1	0	1	0	–		8	0
Avispa Fukuoka (loan)	2021	J1 League	24	1	2	0	0	0	–		–		26	1
Avispa Fukuoka	2022	J1 League	22	0	0	0	2	0	–		–		24	0
Avispa Fukuoka	2023	J1 League	31	0	4	0	7	0	–		–		42	0
Avispa Fukuoka	2024	J1 League	11	0	0	0	0	0	–		–		11	0
Avispa Fukuoka	2025	J1 League	16	0	1	0	2	0	–		–		19	0
Avispa Fukuoka	2026	J1 (100)	6	0	0	0	0	0	–		–		6	0
Avispa Fukuoka	Total		86	0	5	0	11	0	0	0	0	0	102	0
Career total			297	5	20	0	25	1	18	2	2	0	362	8

== Honours ==
=== Club ===
Kawasaki Frontale

- J1 League: 2017, 2018
- Japanese Super Cup: 2019

Avispa Fukuoka

- J.League Cup: 2023
