= Shōgo Taniguchi =

Japanese footballer

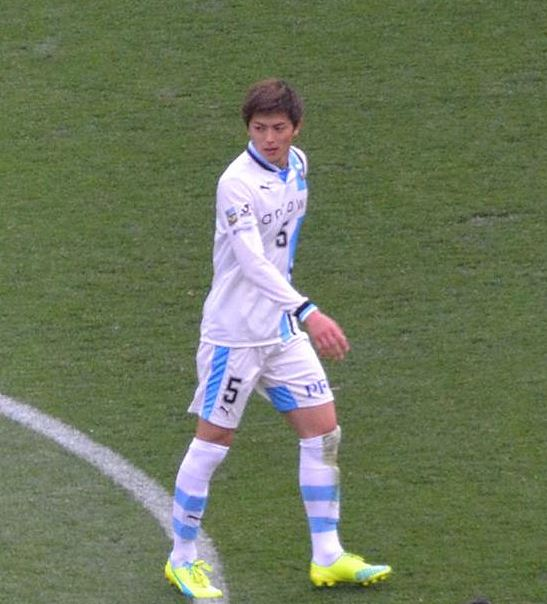
- Taniguchi in 2016

Personal information
- Full name: Shōgo Taniguchi
- Date of birth: 15 July 1991 (age 35)
- Place of birth: Kumamoto, Kumamoto, Japan
- Height: 1.83 m (6 ft 0 in)
- Position: Centre-back

Team information
- Current team: Sint-Truiden
- Number: 5

Youth career
- –2006: Kumamoto United SC
- 2007–2009: Ohzu High School

College career
Years	Team	Apps	(Gls)
2010–2013	University of Tsukuba		

Senior career*
Years	Team	Apps	(Gls)
2014–2022	Kawasaki Frontale	289	(20)
2023–2024	Al-Rayyan	37	(1)
2024–	Sint-Truiden	52	(2)

International career^{‡}
2015–	Japan	41	(1)
Medal record
Men's football
Representing Japan
EAFF Championship
Winner	2022 Japan	Team
- * Club domestic league appearances and goals as of 31 May 2026 ‡ National team caps and goals as of 30 June 2026

Shōgo Taniguchi (谷口 彰悟, Taniguchi Shōgo; born 15 July 1991) is a Japanese professional footballer who plays as a centre-back for Belgian Pro League club Sint-Truiden and the Japan national team.

== Club career ==
Born in Kumamoto, Kumamoto Prefecture, Taniguchi began his career with Tsukuba University.

Taniguchi began his professional career with Kawasaki Frontale in 2014. He lifted the J1 League Trophy four times in 2017, 2018, 2020 and 2021 respectively. He announced his departure from the club after nine years at Kawasaki in 2022 season making a total of 377 appearances for the club.

On 28 December 2022, Taniguchi joined Al Rayyan in Qatar. He scored his first and only goal on 24 April 2024 against Al Ahli in a 4–1 home win.

On 19 July 2024, Taniguchi signed for Belgian side Sint-Truiden. He scored his first goal for the Belgian side on 21 September 2024 in a 3–0 away win against Beerschot.

On 8 November 2024, during a home game against KV Mechelen (2–1) he was forced off due to injury at the 14th minute, being replaced by Zineddine Belaid.

== International career ==
On 7 May 2015, Japan's coach Vahid Halilhodžić called him for a two-days training camp. On 23 July 2015, he was called again for 2015 EAFF East Asian Cup. He was called again for 2022 FIFA World Cup in Qatar.

On 15 May 2026, Taniguchi was selected in the 26-man squad for the 2026 FIFA World Cup.

== Personal life ==
On 25 June 2025, actress Rika Izumi announced her marriage to Taniguchi.

== Career statistics ==
=== Club ===
As of 21 September 2024

Appearances and goals by club, season and competition
Club	Season	League			National cup (Note: Includes Emperor's Cup, Emir Cup, Belgian Cup)		League cup (Note: Includes J. League Cup, QSL Cup)		Continental		Other		Total	
Club	Season	Division	Apps	Goals	Apps	Goals	Apps	Goals	Apps	Goals	Apps	Goals	Apps	Goals
Kawasaki Frontale	2014	J. League Division 1	30	1	1	0	4	0	5 (Note: Appearance(s) in AFC Champions League)	0	—		40	1
Kawasaki Frontale	2015	J. League Division 1	34	2	6	0	1	0	—		—		41	2
Kawasaki Frontale	2016	J1 League	34	1	5	1	6	2	—		—		45	4
Kawasaki Frontale	2017	J1 League	34	7	0	0	4	0	8	1	—		46	8
Kawasaki Frontale	2018	J1 League	34	3	3	1	2	0	4	0	—		43	4
Kawasaki Frontale	2019	J1 League	30	0	2	0	5	0	6	1	1 (Note: Appearance in Japanese Super Cup)	0	44	1
Kawasaki Frontale	2020	J1 League	30	3	2	0	4	0	—		—		36	3
Kawasaki Frontale	2021	J1 League	30	0	4	0	0	0	6	0	1	0	41	0
Kawasaki Frontale	2022	J1 League	33	3	0	0	2	0	5	0	1	0	41	3
Kawasaki Frontale	Total		289	20	23	2	28	2	34	2	3	0	377	26
Al Rayyan	2022–23	Qatar Stars League	15	0	1	0	0	0	1	0	0	0	17	0
Al Rayyan	2023–24	Qatar Stars League	22	1	1	0	1	0	0	0	2 (Note: Appearances in Qatar Cup)	0	26	1
Al Rayyan	Total		37	1	2	0	1	0	1	0	2	0	43	1
Sint-Truiden	2024–25	Belgian Pro League	13	1	1	0	—		—		—		14	1
Career total			339	22	26	2	29	2	35	2	5	0	434	28

=== International ===
As of match played 29 June 2026

Appearances and goals by national team and year
National team	Year	Apps	Goals
Japan	2015	2	0
Japan	2016	0	0
Japan	2017	1	0
Japan	2018	0	0
Japan	2019	0	0
Japan	2020	0	0
Japan	2021	2	0
Japan	2022	11	0
Japan	2023	8	1
Japan	2024	8	1
Japan	2025	3	0
Japan	2026	6	0
Total		41	1

Scores and results list Japan's goal tally first, score column indicates score after each Taniguchi goal.

List of international goals scored by Shōgo Taniguchi
No.	Date	Venue	Opponent	Score	Result	Competition
1	15 June 2023	Toyota Stadium, Toyota, Japan	El Salvador	1–0	6–0	2023 Kirin Challenge Cup

== Honours ==
Kawasaki Frontale

- J1 League: 2017, 2018, 2020, 2021
- Emperor's Cup: 2020
- J.League Cup: 2019
- Japanese Super Cup: 2019, 2021

Japan

- EAFF Championship: 2022

Individual

- J.League Best XI: 2018, 2020, 2021, 2022
- EAFF Championship Best Defender: 2022
