= Elsinho (footballer, born 1989) =

Brazilian footballer

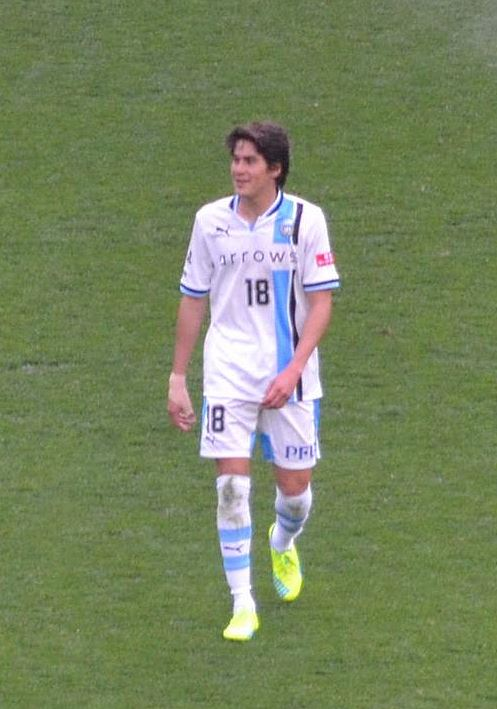
- Elsino with Kawasaki Frontale in 2016

Personal information
- Full name: Elson Ferreira de Souza
- Date of birth: 30 October 1989 (age 37)
- Place of birth: Porto Velho, Brazil
- Height: 1.87 m (6 ft 2 in)
- Position: Right back

Team information
- Current team: Tokushima Vortis
- Number: 18

Youth career
- Genus

Senior career*
Years	Team	Apps	(Gls)
2010	Vilhena	4	(0)
2011	Nacional (Nova Serrana)		
2011	Remo		
2012	CRB	14	(3)
2012–2015	Tombense	0	(0)
2012	→ Figueirense (loan)	18	(0)
2013	→ Vasco da Gama (loan)	11	(0)
2013–2014	→ América-MG (loan)	34	(4)
2015–2018	Kawasaki Frontale	121	(20)
2019–2022	Shimizu S-Pulse	59	(6)
2022–	Tokushima Vortis	97	(9)
- * Club domestic league appearances and goals as of 1 January 2026

Elson Ferreira de Souza (born 30 October 1989), commonly known as Elsinho, is a Brazilian footballer who plays as a right back for Japanese club Tokushima Vortis.

== Club career ==
On 1 January 2015, Elsinho was announced at Kawasaki Frontale on a one-year loan. On 1 February 2017, the club announced that he had extended his contract for the 2017 season. On 10 January 2018, Elsinho extended his contract again, for the 2018 season. After playing against Kashiwa Reysol on 12 May 2018, the club announced that Elsinho had played 100 times for Kawasaki Frontale, becoming the first foreign player to play 100 times for the club. On 2 December 2018, the club announced that Elsinho would leave the club after his contract expired.

On 28 April 2022, Elsinho was announced at J2 League club Tokushima Vortis.

== Career statistics ==
As of match played 12 December 2025

Appearances and goals by club, season and competition
Club	Season	League			State League		Cup		League Cup		Continental		Other		Total	
Club	Season	Division	Apps	Goals	Apps	Goals	Apps	Goals	Apps	Goals	Apps	Goals	Apps	Goals	Apps	Goals
CRB	2012	Série B	14	3	—		—		—		—		—		14	3
Figueirense (loan)	2012	Série A	18	0	—		—		—		—		—		18	0
Vasco da Gama (loan)	2013	Série A	5	0	6	0	—		—		—		—		11	0
América-MG (loan)	2013	Série B	16	2	—		—		—		—		—		16	2
América-MG (loan)	2014	Série B	11	2	7	0	3	1	—		—		—		21	3
América-MG (loan)	Total		27	4	7	0	3	1	—		—		—		37	5
Kawasaki Frontale	2015	J1 League	34	8	—		3	1	6	3	—		—		43	12
Kawasaki Frontale	2016	J1 League	34	5	—		4	1	2	0	—		—		40	6
Kawasaki Frontale	2017	J1 League	21	5	—		1	0	4	2	2	2	—		28	9
Kawasaki Frontale	2018	J1 League	32	2	—		3	1	2	0	3	1	0	0	40	4
Kawasaki Frontale	Total		121	20	—		11	3	14	5	5	3	0	0	151	31
Shimizu S-Pulse	2019	J1 League	27	4	—		2	0	2	0	—		—		31	4
Shimizu S-Pulse	2020	J1 League	20	1	—		—		0	0	—		—		20	1
Shimizu S-Pulse	2021	J1 League	12	1	—		0	0	5	0	—		—		17	1
Shimizu S-Pulse	Total		59	6	—		2	0	7	0	—		—		68	6
Tokushima Vortis	2022	J2 League	22	2	—		0	0	1	0	—		—		23	2
Tokushima Vortis	2023	J2 League	9	1	—		1	0	—		—		—		10	1
Tokushima Vortis	2024	J2 League	32	3	—		0	0	0	0	—		—		32	3
Tokushima Vortis	2025	J2 League	34	3	—		0	0	0	0	—		2	0	36	3
Tokushima Vortis	Total		97	9	—		1	0	1	0	—		2	0	101	9
Career total			341	42	13	0	17	4	22	5	5	3	2	0	400	54

== Honours ==
Kawasaki Frontale

- J1 League: 2017, 2018

Individual

- J.League Best XI: 2017, 2018
