= Ryota Oshima =

Japanese footballer

Ryota Oshima 大島 僚太
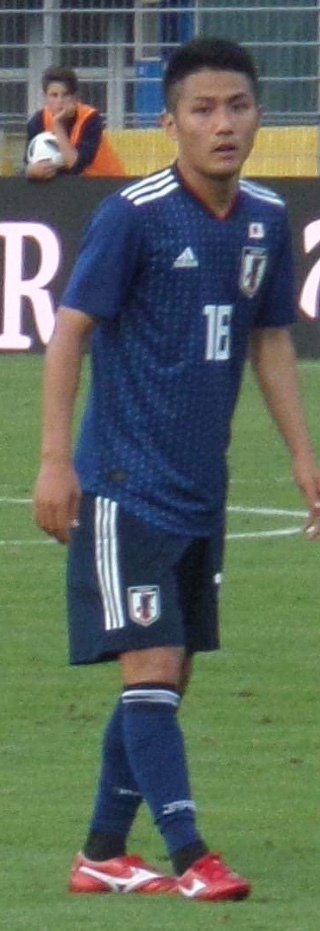
- Ōshima with Japan in 2018

Personal information
- Date of birth: 23 January 1993 (age 33)
- Place of birth: Shimizu-ku, Shizuoka City, Shizuoka, Japan
- Height: 1.68 m (5 ft 6 in)
- Position: Central midfielder

Team information
- Current team: Kawasaki Frontale
- Number: 10

Youth career
- Funakoshi SSS
- 2005–2007: Shizuoka Gakuen Junior High School
- 2008–2010: Shizuoka Gakuen High School

Senior career*
| Years | Team | Apps | (Gls) |
| 2011– | Kawasaki Frontale | 235 | (15) |
| 2015 | → J. League U22 (loan) | 1 | (0) |

International career^{‡}
| 2012 | Japan U19 | 4 | (0) |
| 2016 | Japan U23 | 3 | (0) |
| 2016– | Japan | 7 | (0) |
Medal record
Kawasaki Frontale
| Winner | J1 League | 2017 |
| Winner | J1 League | 2018 |
| Runner-up | J.League Cup | 2017 |
| Runner-up | Emperor's Cup | 2016 |
Representing Japan
AFC U-23 Championship
| Gold medal – first place | 2016 Qatar |
- * Club domestic league appearances and goals as of 5 November 2022 ‡ National team caps and goals as of 18 December 2019

Ryota Oshima (大島 僚太, Ōshima Ryōta; born 23 January 1993) is a Japanese professional footballer who plays as a central midfielder for Kawasaki Frontale.

== International career ==
Oshima was a member of the Japan U-23 national team squad which got qualification to 2016 Summer Olympics by winning the AFC U-23 Championship. In August, he was elected Japan for Olympics. At this tournament, he played all 3 matches.

After that achievement, Oshima has been called for Japan on 26 May for the 2016 Kirin Cup.

In June 2018 he was named in Japan's squad for the 2018 FIFA World Cup in Russia., although he did not figure in any of the team's four matches at the finals.

== Career statistics ==
=== Club ===
As of 5 November 2022

Appearances and goals by club, season and competition
| Club | Season | League | | Emperor's Cup | | J. League Cup | | AFC | | Other | | Total | |
| Club | Season | Apps | Goals | Apps | Goals | Apps | Goals | Apps | Goals | Apps | Goals | Apps | Goals |
|---|---|---|---|---|---|---|---|---|---|---|---|---|---|
| Kawasaki Frontale | 2011 | 9 | 0 | 1 | 0 | 4 | 0 | – | | – | | 14 | 0 |
| Kawasaki Frontale | 2012 | 20 | 3 | 3 | 0 | 3 | 0 | – | | – | | 26 | 3 |
| Kawasaki Frontale | 2013 | 12 | 0 | 1 | 0 | 4 | 0 | – | | – | | 17 | 0 |
| Kawasaki Frontale | 2014 | 28 | 0 | 2 | 0 | 4 | 1 | 7 | 1 | – | | 41 | 2 |
| Kawasaki Frontale | 2015 | 28 | 0 | 3 | 1 | 2 | 0 | – | | – | | 33 | 1 |
| Kawasaki Frontale | 2016 | 24 | 2 | 2 | 0 | 0 | 0 | – | | – | | 26 | 2 |
| Kawasaki Frontale | 2017 | 25 | 1 | 1 | 0 | 2 | 0 | 6 | 0 | – | | 34 | 1 |
| Kawasaki Frontale | 2018 | 29 | 2 | 0 | 0 | 2 | 0 | 4 | 0 | 1 (Note: Appearance in Japanese Super Cup) | 0 | 36 | 1 |
| Kawasaki Frontale | 2019 | 19 | 2 | 0 | 0 | 3 | 0 | 3 | 0 | 1 | 0 | 26 | 2 |
| Kawasaki Frontale | 2020 | 23 | 3 | 2 | 0 | 5 | 1 | – | | – | | 30 | 4 |
| Kawasaki Frontale | 2021 | 7 | 1 | 3 | 0 | 0 | 0 | 5 | 1 | – | | 15 | 2 |
| Kawasaki Frontale | 2022 | 11 | 1 | 0 | 0 | 0 | 0 | 0 | 0 | 1 | 0 | 12 | 0 |
| Total | | 235 | 15 | 18 | 1 | 27 | 2 | 25 | 1 | 3 | 0 | 310 | 19 |

=== International ===
As of 18 December 2019

Appearances and goals by national team and year
| National team | Year | Apps | Goals |
|---|---|---|---|
| Japan | 2016 | 1 | 0 |
| Japan | 2017 | 1 | 0 |
| Japan | 2018 | 3 | 0 |
| Japan | 2019 | 2 | 0 |
| Total | | 7 | 0 |

== Honours ==
Kawasaki Frontale

- J1 League: 2017, 2018, 2020, 2021
- Emperor's Cup: 2020
- J.League Cup: 2019
- Japanese Super Cup: 2019

Japan U23

- AFC U-23 Championship: 2016

Individual

- J.League Best XI: 2018
