= 2019 Japanese Super Cup =

| Kawasaki Frontale | Urawa Red Diamonds |
| 1 | 0 |
- Date: 16 February 2019
- Venue: Saitama Stadium 2002, Saitama
- Referee: Masaaki Toma
- Attendance: 52,587

The 2019 Japanese Super Cup (Fuji Xerox Super Cup 2019) was held on 16 February between the 2018 J1 League champions Kawasaki Frontale and the 2018 Emperor's Cup winner Urawa Red Diamonds. Kawasaki Frontale won the title in regular time.

== Match details ==
16 February 2019
13:35 JST

| Kawasaki Frontale | 1–0 | Urawa Red Diamonds |
|---|---|---|
| Leandro Damião 52' | Report |

Saitama Stadium 2002, Saitama
Attendance: 52,587
Referee: Masaaki Toma

== See also ==
- 2018 J1 League
- 2018 Emperor's Cup
