= 2024 Kawasaki Frontale season =

Kawasaki Frontale
2024 season
- Owner: Fujitsu
- Chairman: Yoshihiro Warashina
- Manager: Toru Oniki
- Stadium: Kawasaki Todoroki Stadium; Kawasaki, Kanagawa
- Average home league attendance: 21,076
Home colours	Away colours

The 2024 season was Kawasaki Frontale's 19th consecutive season in the J1 League. As well as the domestic league, they also participated in the Emperor's Cup, the J.League Cup and the AFC Champions League.

== Players ==
No.	Name	Nationality	Date of birth (age)	Previous club	Contract since	Contract end
Goalkeepers
1	Jung Sung-ryong	(South Korea)	4 January 1985 (age 41)	(South Korea) Suwon Samsung Bluewings	2016	
21	Shunsuke Andō	(Japan)	10 August 1990 (age 35)	(Japan) Shonan Bellmare	2009	
22	Yuki Hayasaka	(Japan)	22 May 1999 (age 26)	(Japan) Toin University of Yokohama	2022	
98	Louis Yamaguchi	(Japan) (France)	28 May 1998 (age 27)	(Japan) FC Machida Zelvia	2024	2024
Defenders
2	Kota Takai	(Japan)	4 September 2004 (age 21)	U-18s	2022	
4	Jesiel	(Brazil)	5 March 1994 (age 32)	(Brazil) Paraná	2019	
5	Asahi Sasaki	(Japan)	26 January 2000 (age 26)	(Japan) Ryutsu Keizai University	2022	
7	Shintaro Kurumaya	(Japan)	5 April 1992 (age 34)	(Japan) University of Tsukuba	2014	
13	Sota Miura	(Japan)	7 September 2000 (age 25)	(Japan) Ventforet Kofu	2024	
15	Shuto Tanabe	(Japan)	5 May 2002 (age 24)	(Japan) JEF United Chiba	2021	
31	Sai van Wermeskerken	(Japan) (Netherlands)	28 June 1994 (age 31)	(Netherlands) NEC Nijmegen	2024	
35	Yuichi Maruyama	(Japan)	16 June 1989 (age 36)	(Japan) Nagoya Grampus	2024	
44	César Haydar	(Colombia)	31 March 2001 (age 25)	(Brazil) Red Bull Bragantino	2024	2024
Midfielders
6	Zé Ricardo	(Brazil)	3 February 1999 (age 27)	(Brazil) Goiás	2024	
8	Kento Tachibanada	(Japan)	29 May 1998 (age 27)	(Japan) Toin University of Yokohama	2020	
10	Ryota Oshima	(Japan)	23 January 1993 (age 33)	(Japan) Shizuoka Gakuen High School	2011	
14	Yasuto Wakizaka	(Japan)	11 June 1995 (age 30)	(Japan) Hannan University	2018	
19	So Kawahara	(Japan)	13 March 1998 (age 28)	(Japan) Sagan Tosu	2024	
26	Hinata Yamauchi	(Japan)	30 May 2001 (age 24)	(Japan) Toin University of Yokohama	2024	2028
28	Patrick Verhon	(Brazil)	8 September 2004 (age 21)	(Brazil) Bahia	2024	
30	Yusuke Segawa	(Japan)	7 February 1994 (age 32)	(Japan) Shonan Bellmare	2023	
34	Kota Yui	(Japan)	10 June 2005 (age 20)	U-18s	2024	2027
41	Akihiro Ienaga	(Japan)	13 June 1986 (age 39)	(Japan) Omiya Ardija	2017	
77	Yuki Yamamoto	(Japan)	6 November 1997 (age 28)	(Japan) Gamba Osaka	2024	
Forwards
9	Erison	(Brazil)	13 April 1999 (age 27)	(Brazil) São Paulo	2024	
11	Yu Kobayashi	(Japan)	23 September 1987 (age 38)	(Japan) Mito HollyHock	2008	
17	Daiya Tono	(Japan)	14 March 1999 (age 27)	(Japan) Avispa Fukuoka	2020	
20	Shin Yamada	(Japan)	30 May 2000 (age 25)	(Japan) Toin University of Yokohama	2022	
23	Marcinho	(Brazil)	16 May 1995 (age 30)	(China) Chongqing Lifan	2021	
24	Ten Miyagi	(Japan)	2 June 2001 (age 24)	(Japan) Montedio Yamagata	2020	
Players who left mid-season
16	Tatsuki Seko	(Japan)	22 December 1997 (age 28)	(Japan) Yokohama FC	2020	
18	Bafétimbi Gomis	(France)	6 August 1985 (age 40)	(Turkey) Galatasaray	2023	

== Transfers ==
=== Pre-season ===
==== In ====
Transfers in

Position	Player	Transferred from	Fee
DF	(Japan) (Netherlands) Sai van Wermeskerken	(Netherlands) NEC Nijmegen	Undisclosed
DF	(Japan) Sota Miura	(Japan) Ventforet Kofu	Undisclosed
DF	(Japan) Yuichi Maruyama	(Japan) Nagoya Grampus	Undisclosed
MF	(Japan) Yuki Yamamoto	(Japan) Gamba Osaka	Undisclosed
MF	(Brazil) Zé Ricardo	(Brazil) Tombense	Undisclosed
MF	(Brazil) Patrick Verhon	(Brazil) Bahia	Undisclosed
FW	(Brazil) Erison	(Brazil) Botafogo	Undisclosed

Loan in

Position	Player	Loaned from	Fee
GK	(Japan) (France) Louis Yamaguchi	(Japan) FC Machida Zelvia	Season loan

Loan return

Position	Player	Transferred from	Fee
MF	(Japan) Renji Matsui	(Japan) FC Machida Zelvia	End of loan
MF	(Japan) Koki Harada	(Japan) AC Nagano Parceiro	End of loan
FW	(Japan) Ten Miyagi	(Japan) Montedio Yamagata	End of loan

==== Out ====
Transfers out

Position	Player	Transferred to	Fee
DF	(Japan) Kazuya Yamamura	(Japan) Yokohama F. Marinos	Free
DF	(Japan) Kyohei Noborizato	(Japan) Cerezo Osaka	Free
DF	(Japan) Miki Yamane	(United States) LA Galaxy	Free
MF	(Japan) Koki Harada	(Japan) ReinMeer Aomori	Undisclosed
MF	(Brazil) João Schmidt	(Brazil) Santos	Undisclosed
FW	(Brazil) Leandro Damião	(Brazil) Coritiba	Free
FW	(Japan) Taisei Miyashiro	(Japan) Vissel Kobe	Free

Loan out

Position	Player	Loaned to	Fee
DF	(Japan) Takuma Ominami	(Belgium) OH Leuven	Season loan
DF	(Japan) Yuto Matsunagane	(Japan) Fukushima United	Season loan
MF	(Japan) Yuto Ozeki	(Japan) Fukushima United	Season loan
MF	(Japan) Renji Matsui	(Japan) Vegalta Sendai	Season loan
MF	(Japan) Toya Myogan	(Japan) Vegalta Sendai	Season loan
FW	(Japan) Taiyo Igarashi	(Japan) Renofa Yamaguchi	Season loan

=== Mid-season ===
==== In ====
Transfers in

Position	Player	Transferred from	Fee
MF	(Japan) So Kawahara	(Japan) Sagan Tosu	Undisclosed

Loan in

Position	Player	Transferred from	Fee
DF	(Colombia) César Haydar	(Brazil) Red Bull Bragantino	Season loan

==== Out ====
Transfers out

Position	Player	Transferred to	Fee
GK	(Japan) Naoto Kamifukumoto	(Japan) Shonan Bellmare	Free
MF	(Japan) Tatsuki Seko	(England) Stoke City	Undisclosed
FW	(France) Bafétimbi Gomis		Free

== Friendly ==
=== Pre-season ===
Win Draw Loss

24 January 2024 1	Hokkaido Consadole Sapporo (Japan)	3-3	(Japan) Kawasaki Frontale	Okinawa, Japan
				Stadium: Akama Athletic Sports Park

31 January 2024 2	FC Machida Zelvia (Japan)	3-0	(Japan) Kawasaki Frontale	Okinawa, Japan
				Stadium: Akama Athletic Sports Park

31 January 2024 3	FC Ryukyu (Japan)	3-2	(Japan) Kawasaki Frontale	Okinawa, Japan
				Stadium: Akama Athletic Sports Park

== Competitions ==
=== J1 League ===
Pos	Team	Pld	W	D	L	GF	GA	GD	Pts
6	Tokyo Verdy	38	14	14	10	51	51	0	56
7	FC Tokyo	38	15	9	14	53	51	+2	54
8	Kawasaki Frontale	38	13	13	12	66	57	+9	52
9	Yokohama F. Marinos	38	15	7	16	61	62	−1	52
10	Cerezo Osaka	38	13	13	12	43	48	−5	52

Source: JLeague.co, JLeague.jp, J.League Data Site
Rules for classification: 1) Points; 2) Goal difference; 3) Goals scored; 4) Head-to-head points; 5) Head-to-head goal difference; 6) Head-to-head goals scored; 7) Fewer disciplinary points.

==== Matches ====
The full league fixtures were released on 23 January 2024.

24 February 1	Shonan Bellmare	1–2	Kawasaki Frontale	Hiratsuka
15:03 JST	Ikeda 7'; Tanaka (yellow card) 43'; Barada (yellow card) 65'; Suzuki (yellow card) 77'; Suzuki (yellow card) 90+3'	Report	Wakizaka 24'; Erison 56'; Yamamoto (yellow card) 51'	Stadium: Lemon Gas Stadium Hiratsuka; Attendance: 12,987; Referee: Koei Koya

1 March 2	Kawasaki Frontale	4–5	Júbilo Iwata	Kawasaki
19:04 UTC+9	Erison 36', 55'; Marcinho 59'; Yamada 85' (pen.); Tachibanada (yellow card) 36'; Jung Sung-Ryong (yellow card) 79'; Segawa (yellow card) 90+6'	Report	Uemura 6'; Germain 18', 29', 80' (pen.), 90+7' (pen.); Graça (yellow card) 48'; Fujikawa (yellow card) 90+12'	Stadium: Uvance Todoroki Stadium by Fujitsu; Attendance: 20,316; Referee: Jumpei Iida

9 March 3	Kawasaki Frontale	0–1	Kyoto Sanga	Kawasaki
16:03 JST	Tanaka (yellow card) 43'; Miura (yellow card) 36'; Sasaki (yellow card) 80'	Report	Kawasaki (yellow card) 26' (goal) 65'; Kaneko (yellow card) 22'	Stadium: Uvance Todoroki Stadium by Fujitsu; Attendance: 20,757; Referee: Lewis Dean Smith

17 March 4	Kashima Antlers	2–1	Kawasaki Frontale	Kashima
15:03 JST	Čavrić 47'; Suzuki 50'; Guilherme Parede (yellow card) 90+7'	Report	Jesiel (yellow card) 34'; Marcinho 36' (yellow card) 54' (yellow-red card) 75'	Stadium: Kashima Soccer Stadium; Attendance: 24,947; Referee: Futoshi Nakamura

30 March 5	Kawasaki Frontale	3–0	FC Tokyo	Kawasaki
15:03 JST	Wakizaka 34'; Yamada 83'; Tachibanada 90+2'	Report	Kimoto (yellow card) 26'; Hatano (red card) 72'	Stadium: Uvance Todoroki Stadium by Fujitsu; Attendance: 22,543; Referee: Masuya Ueda

3 April 6	Yokohama F. Marinos	0–0	Kawasaki Frontale	Yokohama
18:33 JST	Kota Takai (yellow card) 22'; Kento Tachibanada (yellow card) 45+5'; Akihiro Ienaga (yellow card) 56'; Asahi Sasaki (yellow card) 61'; Marcinho (red card) 73'	Report		Stadium: Nissan Stadium; Attendance: 26,031; Referee: Hiroyuki Kimura

7 April 7	Kawasaki Frontale	0–1	Machida Zelvia	Kawasaki
15:03 UTC+9	Zé Ricardo (yellow card) 23'; Erison (yellow card) 56'	Report	Fujio 32'; Kotaro Hayashi (yellow card) 22'; Oh Se-hun (yellow card) 59'; Tani (red card) 71'	Stadium: Uvance Todoroki Stadium by Fujitsu; Attendance: 22,008; Referee: Yudai Yamamoto

13 April 8	Cerezo Osaka	1–0	Kawasaki Frontale	Osaka
15:03 UTC+9	Marcinho (yellow card) 55'; Erison (yellow card) 60'	Report	Léo Ceará 70'	Stadium: Yodoko Sakura Stadium; Attendance: 18,786; Referee: Takafumi Mikuriya

20 April 9	Kawasaki Frontale	0–0	Tokyo Verdy	Kawasaki
15:03 UTC+9	Shin Yamada (yellow card) 32'	Report	Tomoya Miki (yellow card) 33'; Itsuki Someno (yellow card) 37'	Stadium: Uvance Todoroki Stadium by Fujitsu; Attendance: 21,732; Referee: Hiroki Kasahara

28 April 10	Sanfrecce Hiroshima	2–2	Kawasaki Frontale	Kawasaki
14:03 UTC+9	Yuki Ohashi 38'; Mutsuki Kato 75'; Tsukasa Shiotani (yellow card) 63'; Naoto Arai (yellow card) 90+2'	Report	Yu Kobayashi 65'; Shin Yamada 74'; Erison (yellow card) 41'; Akihiro Ienaga (yellow card) 51'; Tatsuki Seko (yellow card) 87'	Stadium: Uvance Todoroki Stadium by Fujitsu; Attendance: 26,051; Referee: Takuto Okabe

3 May 11	Kawasaki Frontale	3–1	Urawa Red Diamonds	Kawasaki
16:03 JST	Wakizaka 18'; Sasaki 49'; Ienaga 90+3'	Report	Okubo 35'; Alexander Scholz (yellow card) 42'	Stadium: Uvance Todoroki Stadium by Fujitsu; Attendance: 23,457; Referee: Akihiko Ikeuchi

6 May 12	Avispa Fukuoka	1–1	Kawasaki Frontale	Fukuoka
14:03 UTC+9	Kazuya Konno 85'	Report	Shin Yamada (yellow card) 75'; Erison (yellow card) 42'	Stadium: Best Denki Stadium; Attendance: 9,174; Referee: Hayato Shimizu

11 May 13	Kawasaki Frontale	3–0	Hokkaido Consadole Sapporo	Kawasaki
16:03 JST	Bafétimbi Gomis 30', 43', 45+3'; Asahi Sasaki (yellow card) 61'; Daiya Tono (yellow card) 63'	Report	Takanori Sugeno (yellow card) 45'; Tomoki Kondo (yellow card) 60'	Stadium: Uvance Todoroki Stadium by Fujitsu; Attendance: 20,611; Referee: Shu Kawamata

15 May 14	Sagan Tosu	5–2	Kawasaki Frontale	Tosu
18:03 JST	Ayumu Yokoyama 26', 37' (yellow card) 18'; Marcelo Ryan 44'; Wataru Harada 47'; Atsushi Kawata 75'	Report	Kota Takai 13'; Akihiro Ienaga 45+3'	Stadium: Ekimae Real Estate Stadium; Attendance: 6,222; Referee: Hiroki Kasahara

19 May 15	Gamba Osaka	3–1	Kawasaki Frontale	Osaka
14:03 JST	Shinnosuke Nakatani 28'; Shota Fukuoka 70'; Shu Kurata 81'	Report	Yusuke Segawa 26'; Sai van Wermeskerken (yellow card) 47'	Stadium: Panasonic Stadium Suita; Attendance: 24,754; Referee: Jumpei Iida

25 May 16	Kawasaki Frontale	1–1	Kashiwa Reysol	Kawasaki
15:03 JST	Yasuto Wakizaka 30'; Takuma Ominami (yellow card) 57'; Daiya Tono (yellow card) 58'; Asahi Sasahi (yellow card) 88'	Report	Kosuke Kinoshita 59'; Mao Hosoya (yellow card) 90'	Stadium: Kawasaki Todoroki Stadium; Attendance: 21,598; Referee: Hiroyuki Kimura

2 June 17	Kawasaki Frontale	2–1	Nagoya Grampus	Kawasaki
17:03 JST (UTC+9)	Ienaga 6', 18'; Takai (yellow card) 53'; Tachibanada (yellow card) 85'	Report	Ha C-R 89'	Stadium: Kawasaki Todoroki Stadium; Attendance: 19,463; Referee: Mikuriya Takafumi

16 June 18	Vissel Kobe	1–0	Kawasaki Frontale	Tokyo
14:03 JST	Muto 43'; Gōtoku Sakai (yellow card) 50'	Report	Kento Tachibanada (yellow card) 14'	Stadium: Japan National Stadium; Attendance: 49,541; Referee: Damian Sylwestrzak

22 June 19	Albirex Niigata	2–2	Kawasaki Frontale	Tokyo
17:03 JST	Marcinho 17'; Koji Suzuki 90+7'; Yuto Horigome (yellow card) 54'; Michael James (yellow card) 70'	Report	Yuto Horigome 54'; Shin Yamada 90+11'; Tatsuki Seko (yellow card) 88'	Stadium: Japan National Stadium; Attendance: 33,885; Referee: Hiroki Kasahara

26 June 20	Kawasaki Frontale	1–1	Shonan Bellmare	Kawasaki
15:03 JST	Yasuto Wakizaka 30'; Shin Yamada (yellow card) 33'; Ryota Oshima (yellow card) 88'; Takuma Ominami (yellow card) 90+5'	Report	Satoshi Tanaka 78'; Akimi Barada (yellow card) 90+7'	Stadium: Kawasaki Todoroki Stadium; Attendance: 20,720; Referee: Hayato Shimizu

29 June 21	Kawasaki Frontale	1–1	Shonan Bellmare	Kawasaki
15:03 JST	Marcinho 23'; Yasuto Wakizaka (yellow card) 35'; Asahi Sasaki (yellow card) 68'; Kota Takai (yellow card) 90+1'	Report	Makoto Mitsuta 88'; Sho Sasaki (yellow card) 61'; Marcos Junior (yellow card) 90+7'	Stadium: Kawasaki Todoroki Stadium; Attendance: 22,393; Referee: Yoshiro Imamura

6 July 22	Júbilo Iwata	2–2	Kawasaki Frontale	Iwata
15:03 JST	Ryo Germain 20'; Hiroki Yamada 90+2'; Kaito Suzuki (yellow card) 83'	Report	Daiya Tono 51'; Kento Tachibanada 80'	Stadium: Yamaha Stadium; Attendance: 13,153; Referee: Takafumi Mikuriya

14 July 23	Kawasaki Frontale	1–1	Cerezo Osaka	Kawasaki
15:03 JST	Marcinho 36'; Shin Yamada (yellow card) 33'	Report	Makoto Mitsuta 88'; Hayato Okuda (yellow card) 49'	Stadium: Kawasaki Todoroki Stadium; Attendance: 20,725; Referee: Hiroyuki Kimura

20 July 24	Kashiwa Reysol	2–3	Kawasaki Frontale	Kashiwa
15:03 JST	Shin Yamada 4', 10'; Yasuto Wakizaka 79'; Sai van Wermeskerken (yellow card) 74'	Report	Eiji Shirai 12'; Yuki Kakita 68'	Stadium: Sankyo Frontier Kashiwa Stadium; Attendance: 12,853; Referee: Futoshi Nakamura

7 August 25	Kawasaki Frontale	3–0	Vissel Kobe	Kawasaki
18:03 JST	Ienaga 57'; Yamada 71', 85'; Asahi Sasaki (yellow card) 20'	Report	Nanasei Lino (yellow card) 30' (yellow-red card) 45'; Matheus Thuler (red card) 65'	Stadium: Uvance Todoroki Stadium by Fujitsu; Attendance: 18,318; Referee: Hiroki Kasahara

11 August 26	FC Tokyo	0–3	Kawasaki Frontale	Chofu
19:00 JST	Diego Oliveira (yellow card) 36'	Report	Yamada 15', 20'; Takai 72'	Stadium: Ajinomoto Stadium; Attendance: 37,452; Referee: Yuichi Nishimura

17 August 27	Kawasaki Frontale	1–3	Yokohama F. Marinos	Kawasaki
15:03 JST	Erison 89'; Kota Takai (yellow card) 63'	Report	Anderson Lopes 58'; Takuma Nishimura 60'; Shinnosuke Hatanaka 78'; Elber (yellow card) 90+2'	Stadium: Kawasaki Todoroki Stadium; Attendance: 22,850; Referee: Koichiro Fukushima

22 November 28 (Rescheduled)	Urawa Red Diamonds	1–1	Kawasaki Frontale	Saitama
15:03 JST	Watanabe 37'; Thiago Santana (yellow card) 88'	Report	Kobayashi 55'	Stadium: Saitama Stadium 2002; Attendance: 35,188; Referee: Masuya Ueda

1 September 29	Hokkaido Consadole Sapporo	2–0	Kawasaki Frontale	Kawasaki
15:03 JST	Aoki 70'; Suzuki 80'	Report		Stadium: Kawasaki Todoroki Stadium; Attendance: 21,022; Referee: Koei Koya

13 September 30	Kawasaki Frontale	3–2	Sagan Tosu	Kawasaki
15:03 JST	Tachibanada 11'; Ienaga 61'; Yamada 90+10'	Report	Kubo 51'; Kiyotake 90'; Kim Tae-hyeon (yellow card) 90+2'	Stadium: Kawasaki Todoroki Stadium; Attendance: 18,397; Referee: Koki Nagamine

22 September 31	Nagoya Grampus	2–0	Kawasaki Frontale	Aichi
16:04 JST (UTC+9)	Nagai 34'; Izumi 67'; Tokumoto (yellow card) 64'	Report	van Wermeskerken (yellow card) 80' (yellow-red card) 82'	Stadium: Toyota Stadium; Attendance: 32,768; Referee: Abdulhadi Al Ruaile

27 September 32	Kawasaki Frontale	5–1	Albirex Niigata	Kawasaki
15:03 JST	Erison 14', 63'; Wakizaka 18'; Yamada 65', 73'; Marcinho (yellow card) 40'; Takai (yellow card) 54'	Report	Ota 88'; Kojima (yellow card) 11'	Stadium: Kawasaki Todoroki Stadium; Attendance: 20,142; Referee: Futoshi Nakamura

5 October 33	Machida Zelvia	1–4	Kawasaki Frontale	Machida
15:03 UTC+9	Nakashima 13'; Fujio (yellow card) 83'	Report	Miura 28'; Yamada 38'; Erison 50' (pen.); Marcinho 71'	Stadium: Machida GION Stadium; Attendance: 12,753; Referee: Yoshiro Imamura

18 October 34	Kawasaki Frontale	1–1	Gamba Osaka	Kawasaki
19:03 JST	Kobayashi 81'; Segawa (yellow card) 48'; Marcinho (yellow card) 53'	Report	Welton 7'; Nakatani (yellow card) 58'	Stadium: Uvance Todoroki Stadium by Fujitsu; Attendance: 19,982; Referee: Yoshimi Yamashita

1 November 35	Kawasaki Frontale	1–3	Kashima Antlers	Kawasaki
19:03 JST	Yamamoto 90+2'; Segawa (yellow card) 90+5'	Report	Chinen 10'; Higuchi 18'; Misao 28' (yellow card) 75'	Stadium: Uvance Todoroki Stadium by Fujitsu; Attendance: 20,834; Referee: Ryo Tanimoto
Note: Matchweek 35

9 November 36	Kyoto Sanga	1–1	Kawasaki Frontale	Kyoto
14:00 JST	Rafael Elias 78' (pen.); Tawiah (yellow card) 23'; Suzuki (yellow card) 65'	Report	Yamada 58'; van Wermeskerken (yellow card) 31'	Stadium: Sanga Stadium by Kyocera; Attendance: 15,643; Referee: Hiroki Kasahara

30 November 37	Tokyo Verdy	4–5	Kawasaki Frontale	Chōfu
14:00 JST	Miki 42'; Taniguchi 49', 71', 84'	Report	Yamada 16' (pen.), 22', 90+4' van Wermeskerken 58'; Marcinho 65'; Sasaki (yellow card) 11'; Erison (yellow card) 90+6'	Stadium: Ajinomoto Stadium; Attendance: 26,387; Referee: Yoshimi Yamashita

8 December 38	Kawasaki Frontale	3–1	Avispa Fukuoka	Kawasaki
19:03 JST	Ienaga 8'; Kobayashi 27'; Marcinho 48'; Jung Sung-ryong (yellow card) 78'	Report	Matsuoka 51'; Inoue (yellow card) 58'	Stadium: Uvance Todoroki Stadium by Fujitsu; Attendance: 23,603; Referee: Keigo Sendachi

=== J.League Cup ===
The 2024 J.League Cup was expanded so that all 60 J.League clubs would participate. As they qualified for the 2024–25 AFC Champions League, they were granted automatic qualification for the quarter-finals.

4 September 2024 Quarter-final 1st leg	Kawasaki Frontale	1–0	Ventforet Kofu	Kawasaki
19:03	Tono 27'	Report		Stadium: Uvance Todoroki Stadium by Fujitsu; Attendance: 14,847; Referee: Yudai Yamamoto

8 September 2024 Quarter-final 2nd leg	Ventforet Kofu	1–1 (1–2 agg.)	Kawasaki Frontale	Kofu
18:03	Taiga Son 31'	Report	Tono 90+3'	Stadium: JIT Recycle Ink Stadium; Attendance: 10,273; Referee: Akihiko Ikeuchi

9 October 2024 Semi-final 1st leg	Albirex Niigata	4–1	Kawasaki Frontale	Niigata
19:03	Taniguchi 25'; Ota 45'; Hasegawa 50'; Hoshi 53'	Report	Segawa 71'	Stadium: Denka Big Swan Stadium; Attendance: 12,501; Referee: Yudai Yamamoto

13 October 2024 Semi-final 2nd leg	Kawasaki Frontale	0–2 (1–6 agg.)	Albirex Niigata	Kawasaki
15:00		Report	Komi 31'; Ota 89'	Stadium: Uvance Todoroki Stadium by Fujitsu; Attendance: 21,159; Referee: Akihiko Ikeuchi

=== Emperor's Cup ===
12 June Second round	Kawasaki Frontale	2–0	Sony Sendai	Kawasaki
19:00	Yamada 39'; Marcinho 58'	Report		Stadium: Uvance Todoroki Stadium by Fujitsu; Attendance: 7,000; Referee: Yuichi Nishimura

10 July Third round	Kawasaki Frontale	1–3	Oita Trinita	Oita
19:00	Erison 89'	Report	Sasaki 61' (o.g.); Yasuda 63'; Ayukawa 78' (pen.)	Stadium: Resonac Dome Oita; Attendance: 4,056; Referee: Takuto Okabe

=== Super Cup ===
17 February	Vissel Kobe	0–1	Kawasaki Frontale	Shinjuku
13:35 JST	Takahiro Ogihara (yellow card) 67'	Report	van Wermeskerken 48'; Tanabe (yellow card) 15'; Gomis (yellow card) 25'; Tachibanada (yellow card) 90+3'	Stadium: Japan National Stadium; Attendance: 52,142; Referee: Akihiko Ikeuchi

=== 2023–24 AFC Champions League ===
==== Knockout stage ====
13 February 2024 Round of 16 1st leg	Shandong Taishan (China)	2–3	(Japan) Kawasaki Frontale	Jinan
18:00 UTC+8	Fernandinho 67'; Jadson 85'	Report	Erison 28' (pen.); Marcinho 33'; Ienaga 79'	Stadium: Jinan Olympic Sports Center Stadium; Attendance: 46,273; Referee: Muhammad Taqi (Singapore)

20 February 2024 Round of 16 2nd leg	Kawasaki Frontale (Japan)	2–4 (5–6 agg.)	(China) Shandong Taishan	Kawasaki
17:00 UTC+9	Miura 30'; Erison 59'	Report	Cryzan 8', 73'; Gao Zhunyi 25'; Jadson 90+7'	Stadium: Uvance Todoroki Stadium by Fujitsu; Attendance: 11,732; Referee: Ahmad Al-Ali (Kuwait)

=== 2024–25 AFC Champions League Elite ===
Pos	Team	Pld	W	D	L	GF	GA	GD	Pts	Qualification
1	(Japan) Yokohama F. Marinos	7	6	0	1	21	7	+14	18	Advance to round of 16
2	(Japan) Kawasaki Frontale	7	5	0	2	13	4	+9	15	Advance to round of 16
3	(Malaysia) Johor Darul Ta'zim	7	4	2	1	16	8	+8	14	Advance to round of 16
4	(South Korea) Gwangju	7	4	2	1	15	9	+6	14	Advance to round of 16
5	(Japan) Vissel Kobe	7	4	1	2	14	9	+5	13	Advance to round of 16

Source: Asian Football Confederation
Rules for classification: 1) points; 2) goal difference; 3) number of goals scored; 4) number of matches won; 5) penalty shoot-out if only two teams remain tied and played each other on the final matchday 6) fair play ranking; 7) drawing of lots

Win Draw Loss

==== League stage ====
18 September 2024 1	Ulsan HD (South Korea)	0–1	(Japan) Kawasaki Frontale	Ulsan, South Korea
19:00 UTC+9	Matheus Sales (yellow card) 7'; Yun Il-lok (yellow card) 41'	Report	Marcinho 54'; Miura (yellow card) 42'; Tono (yellow card) 83'	Stadium: Ulsan Munsu Football Stadium; Attendance: 9,673; Referee: Omar Mohamed Al-Ali (United Arab Emirates)

1 October 2024 2	Kawasaki Frontale (Japan)	0–1	(South Korea) Gwangju	Kawasaki, Japan
19:00 UTC+9	César Haydar (yellow card) 21'; Erison (yellow card) 90+3'	Report	Asani 21' (pen.); Lee Kang-hyun (yellow card) 90+3'	Stadium: Kawasaki Todoroki Stadium; Attendance: 12,527; Referee: Mohanad Qasim Sarray (Iraq)

23 October 2024 3	Shanghai Shenhua (China)	2–0	(Japan) Kawasaki Frontale	Shanghai, China
20:00 UTC+8	Wang Haijian 24'; André Luis 90+3'; Amadou (yellow card) 36'; Xu Haoyang (yellow card) 64'; João Carlos Teixeira (yellow card) 84'	Report	Marcinho (red card) 5'	Stadium: Shanghai Stadium; Attendance: 23,102; Referee: Muhammad Taqi (Singapore)

5 November 2024 4	Kawasaki Frontale (Japan)	3–1	(China) Shanghai Port	Kawasaki, Japan
19:00 UTC+9	Ienaga 12' (yellow card) 87' (yellow-red card) 90'; Segawa 13'; van Wermeskerken 31'	Report	Matías Vargas 83'; Wang Shenchao (yellow card) 3'; Oscar (yellow card) 46'; Wei Zhen (yellow card) 48'; Yang Shiyuan (yellow card) 77'	Stadium: Kawasaki Todoroki Stadium; Attendance: 11,757; Referee: Salman Ahmad Falahi (Qatar)

26 November 2024 5	Buriram United (Thailand)	0–3	(Japan) Kawasaki Frontale	Buriram, Thailand
19:00 UTC+7	Dougall (yellow card) 17'; Chrigor (yellow card) 87'	Report	Miura 79'; Tono 90+4'; Kanda 90+7'; Yamamoto (yellow card) 24'	Stadium: Buriram Stadium; Attendance: 16,902; Referee: Mohammed Al Hoaish (Saudi Arabia)

3 December 2024 6	Kawasaki Frontale (Japan)	Voided (4–0)	(China) Shandong Taishan	Kawasaki, Japan
19:00 UTC+9	Marcinho 3'; Yamamoto 41'; Kobayashi (yellow card) 33'; Jesiel 65' (yellow card) 60'; Shin Yamada 90'	Report	Chen Pu (yellow card) 20'; Li Yuanyi (yellow card) 80'	Stadium: Kawasaki Todoroki Stadium; Attendance: 13,840; Referee: Adel Al-Naqbi (United Arab Emirates)

11 February 2025 7	Pohang Steelers (South Korea)	v	(Japan) Kawasaki Frontale	Pohang, South Korea
19:00 UTC+9				Stadium: Pohang Steel Yard

18 February 2025 8	Kawasaki Frontale (Japan)	v	(Australia) Central Coast Mariners	Kawasaki, Japan
19:00 UTC+9				Stadium: Kawasaki Todoroki Stadium

== Team statistics ==
=== Appearances and goals ===
As of 8 Dec 2024

No.	Pos.	Player	J1 League		J.League Cup		Emperor's Cup		Super Cup		AFC Champions League 2023/24 ACL		AFC Champions League Elite		Total	
No.	Pos.	Player	Apps.	Goals	Apps.	Goals	Apps.	Goals	Apps.	Goals	Apps.	Goals	Apps.	Goals	Apps.	Goals
1	GK	(South Korea) Jung Sung-ryong	29	0	2	0	1	0	0	0	2	0	6	0	40	0
2	DF	(Japan) Kota Takai	21+3	2	0	0	0	0	1	0	0+1	0	3	0	29	2
4	DF	(Brazil) Jesiel	11+7	0	0	0	0	0	0	0	1+1	0	1+2	1	23	1
5	DF	(Japan) Asahi Sasaki	33+2	1	4	0	1+1	0	0	0	2	0	4+1	0	48	1
6	MF	(Brazil) Zé Ricardo	3+8	0	0	0	1+1	0	1	0	0	0	0	0	14	0
7	DF	(Japan) Shintaro Kurumaya	1+2	0	1	0	1	0	0	0	0	0	0	0	5	0
8	MF	(Japan) Kento Tachibanada	32+2	3	3+1	0	1+1	0	0	0	2	0	5+1	0	48	3
9	FW	(Brazil) Erison	15+10	7	3+1	0	0+1	1	0	0	2	2	3+2	0	36	10
10	MF	(Japan) Ryota Oshima	9+5	0	1	0	0	0	0	0	0	0	0+2	0	17	0
11	DF	(Japan) Yu Kobayashi	3+23	4	0+1	0	0+1	0	0	0	0	0	4+2	0	34	4
13	MF	(Japan) Sota Miura	19+1	1	3+1	0	0	0	0	0	1	1	6	1	31	3
14	MF	(Japan) Yasuto Wakizaka	32+2	6	3	0	1	0	0	0	2	0	2	0	42	6
15	DF	(Japan) Shuto Tanabe	0+4	0	0	0	1+1	0	1	0	0+1	0	0	0	8	0
17	FW	(Japan) Daiya Tono	19+16	1	2+2	2	1+1	0	0	0	0	0	2+4	1	47	4
19	DF	(Japan) So Kawahara	5+4	0	4	0	0	0	0	0	0	0	2+3	0	18	0
20	FW	(Japan) Shin Yamada	21+16	19	2+2	0	2	1	1	0	0+2	0	1+5	1	52	21
22	GK	(Japan) Yuki Hayasaka	1	0	0	0	0	0	0	0	0	0	0	0	1	0
23	FW	(Brazil) Marcinho	32+3	9	3+1	0	1+1	1	0	0	2	1	3+1	2	47	13
24	FW	(Japan) Ten Miyagi	0+3	0	0+1	0	0+1	0	0	0	0	0	0	0	5	0
26	MF	(Japan) Hinata Yamauchi	4+12	0	0	0	1+1	0	1	0	0	0	1+1	0	21	0
28	FW	(Brazil) Patrick Verhon	0+2	0	0	0	0	0	1	0	0	0	0	0	3	0
30	MF	(Japan) Yusuke Segawa	13+14	1	1+3	1	2	0	0	0	1+1	0	5+1	1	41	3
31	DF	(Japan) (Netherlands) Sai van Wermeskerken	21+3	1	2+1	0	0	0	1	1	0+1	0	5	1	34	3
32	FW	(Japan) Soma Kanada	0+1	0	0	0	0	0		0	0	0	0+2	1	3	1
35	DF	(Japan) Yuichi Maruyama	5+2	0	1+1	0	0	0	1	0	1+1	0	4+1	0	17	0
41	MF	(Japan) Akihiro Ienaga	28+8	7	2+2	0	2	0	0	0	2	1	3+2	1	49	9
44	DF	(Colombia) César Haydar	2	0	3	0	0	0	0	0	0	0	1	0	6	0
77	MF	(Japan) Yuki Yamamoto	15+5	1	2+2	0	2	0	0	0	2	0	5	1	33	2
98	GK	(Japan) (France) Louis Yamaguchi	0	0	2	0	0	0	0	0	0	0	0	0	2	0
Players featured on a match for the team, but left the club mid-season, either permanently or on loan transfer
3	DF	(Japan) Takuma Ominami	19+4	0	0	0	2	0	0	0	2	0	0	0	27	0
16	DF	(Japan) Tatsuki Seko	11+14	0	0	0	1+1	0	1	0	0+1	0	0	0	29	0
18	FW	(France) Bafétimbi Gomis	6+2	3	0	0	0	0	1	0	0+1	0	0	0	10	3
99	GK	(Japan) Naoto Kamifukumoto	8	0	0	0	1	0	1	0	0	0	0	0	10	0
