= 2025 AFC Champions League Elite final =

Football match

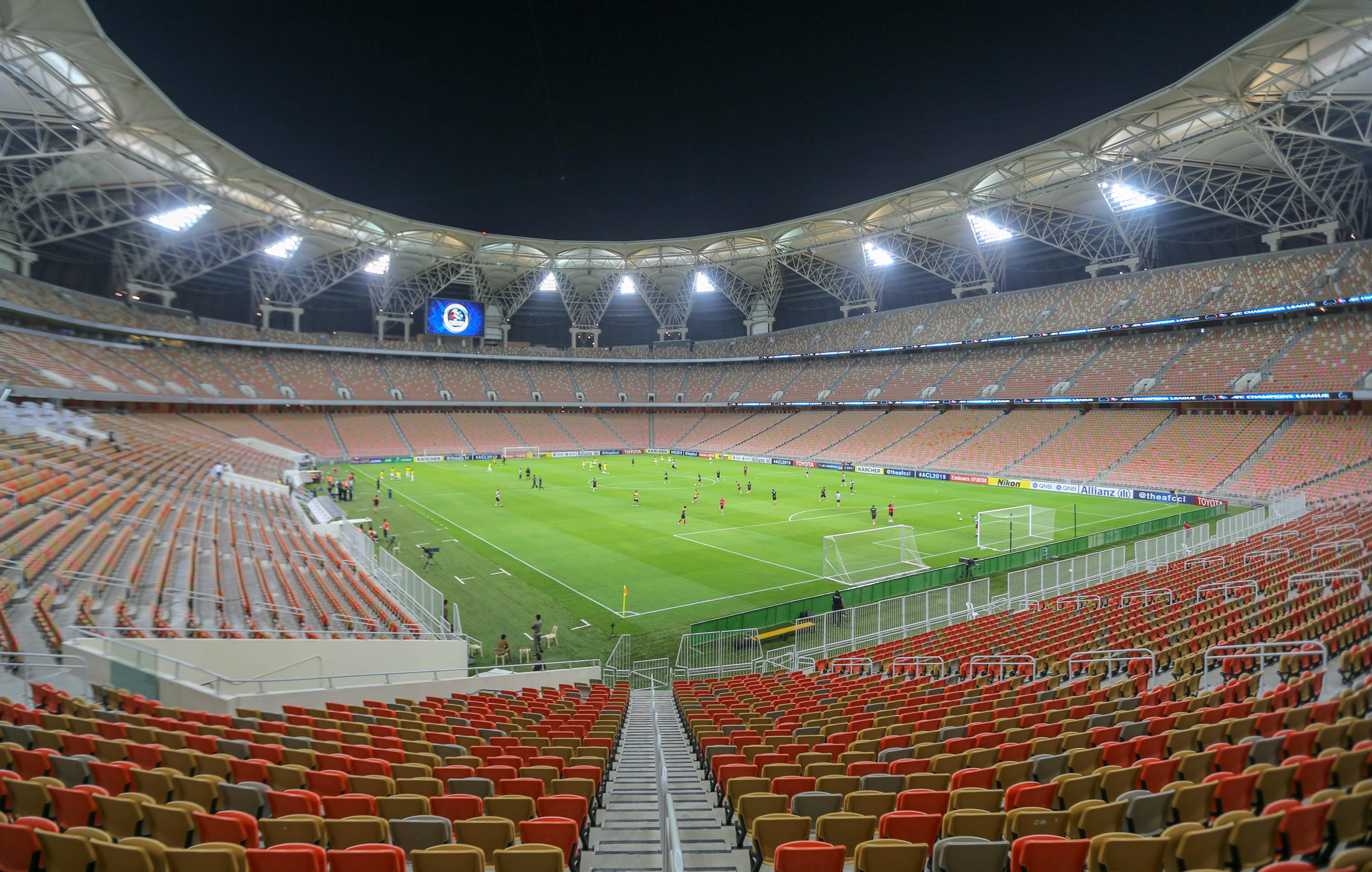
- The King Abdullah Sports City Stadium in Jeddah hosted the final.
- Event: 2024–25 AFC Champions League Elite
Al-Ahli	Kawasaki Frontale
(Saudi Arabia)	(Japan)
2	0
- Date: 3 May 2025
- Venue: King Abdullah Sports City Stadium, Jeddah
- Referee: Abdulrahman Al-Jassim (Qatar)
- Attendance: 58,281

The 2025 AFC Champions League Elite final was the final match of the 2024–25 AFC Champions League Elite, the 43rd season of Asia's premier club football tournament organised by the Asian Football Confederation (AFC), and the first since it was rebranded as the AFC Champions League Elite. It was played at King Abdullah Sports City Stadium in Jeddah, Saudi Arabia, on 3 May 2025.

This was the first final since 2018 that neither team had won an Asian Club Championship before, and the first since 2012 to be one-legged.

Al-Ahli defeated Kawasaki Frontale 2–0, winning a first Champions League title.

== Teams ==
In the following table, the finals until 2002 were in the Asian Club Championship era, and from 2003 to 2024 were in the AFC Champions League era.

Team	Region (Federation)	Previous finals appearances (bold indicates winners)
(Saudi Arabia) Al-Ahli	West (WAFF)	2 (1985–86, 2012)
(Japan) Kawasaki Frontale	East (EAFF)	None

== Match details ==
3 May 2025
19:30 UTC+3

Al-Ahli (Saudi Arabia)	2–0	(Japan) Kawasaki Frontale
Galeno 35'; Kessié 42'	Report

King Abdullah Sports City Stadium, Jeddah
Attendance: 58,281
Referee: Abdulrahman Al-Jassim (Qatar)

**Al-Ahli**	**Kawasaki Frontale**

GK	16	(Senegal) Édouard Mendy	(yellow card) 90+1'
RB	27	(Saudi Arabia) Ali Majrashi
CB	28	(Turkey) Merih Demiral	(yellow card) 44'
CB	3	(Brazil) Roger Ibañez
LB	77	(North Macedonia) Ezgjan Alioski
CM	79	(Ivory Coast) Franck Kessié
CM	30	(Saudi Arabia) Ziyad Al-Johani	(yellow card) 85'	(substituted off) 85'
RW	7	(Algeria) Riyad Mahrez		(substituted off) 90+5'
AM	10	(Brazil) Roberto Firmino (c)		(substituted off) 74'
LW	13	(Brazil) Galeno		(substituted off) 74'
CF	99	(England) Ivan Toney
Substitutes:
GK	1	(Saudi Arabia) Abdulrahman Al-Sanbi
GK	62	(Saudi Arabia) Abdullah Abdoh
DF	5	(Saudi Arabia) Mohammed Bakor
DF	31	(Saudi Arabia) Saad Balobaid
DF	32	(Belgium) Matteo Dams
DF	46	(Saudi Arabia) Rayan Hamed
MF	8	(Saudi Arabia) Sumayhan Al-Nabit
MF	11	(Brazil) Alexsander		(substituted on) 85'
MF	14	(Saudi Arabia) Eid Al-Muwallad
MF	19	(Saudi Arabia) Fahad Al-Rashidi		(substituted on) 90+5'
MF	24	(Spain) Gabri Veiga		(substituted on) 74'
FW	9	(Saudi Arabia) Firas Al-Buraikan		(substituted on) 74'
Manager:
(Germany) Matthias Jaissle

GK	98	(Japan) Louis Yamaguchi
RB	5	(Japan) Asahi Sasaki
CB	2	(Japan) Kōta Takai
CB	35	(Japan) Yuichi Maruyama
LB	13	(Japan) Sota Miura	(substituted off) 42'
CM	77	(Japan) Yuki Yamamoto	(substituted off) 65'
CM	19	(Japan) So Kawahara	(substituted off) 84'
RW	41	(Japan) Akihiro Ienaga	(substituted off) 65'
AM	14	(Japan) Yasuto Wakizaka (c)
LW	23	(Brazil) Marcinho
CF	9	(Brazil) Erison	(substituted off) 46'
Substitutes:
GK	1	(South Korea) Jung Sung-ryong
GK	21	(Japan) Shunsuke Andō
DF	15	(Japan) Shuto Tanabe
DF	31	(Japan) Sai van Wermeskerken	(substituted on) 42'
DF	44	(Colombia) César Haydar
MF	8	(Japan) Kento Tachibanada
MF	16	(Japan) Yuto Ozeki	(substituted on) 65'
MF	26	(Japan) Hinata Yamauchi	(substituted on) 84'
MF	30	(Japan) Yusuke Segawa
FW	20	(Japan) Shin Yamada	(substituted on) 46'
FW	32	(Japan) Soma Kanda
FW	37	(Japan) Tatsuya Ito	(substituted on) 65'
Manager:
(Japan) Shigetoshi Hasebe

Assistant referees:
Taleb Al-Marri (Qatar)
Ramzan Al-Naemi (Qatar)
Fourth official:
Ahmad Al-Ali (Kuwait)
Fifth official:
Abdulhadi Al-Anezi (Kuwait)
Video assistant referee:
Khamis Al-Marri (Qatar)
Assistant video assistant referee:
Fu Ming (China)

**Match rules**

- 90 minutes.
- 30 minutes of extra time if tied.
- Penalty shoot-out if still tied after extra time.
- Twelve named substitutes, of which up to five may be used, with a sixth allowed in extra time. (Note: Each team was only given three opportunities to make substitutions, with a fourth opportunity in extra time, excluding substitutions made at half-time, before the start of extra time and at half-time in extra time.)

== See also ==
- 2025 AFC Champions League Two final (2nd Tier)
- 2025 AFC Challenge League final (3rd Tier)
- 2025 AFC Women's Champions League final (Women's)
