= Bafétimbi Gomis =

French footballer (born 1985)

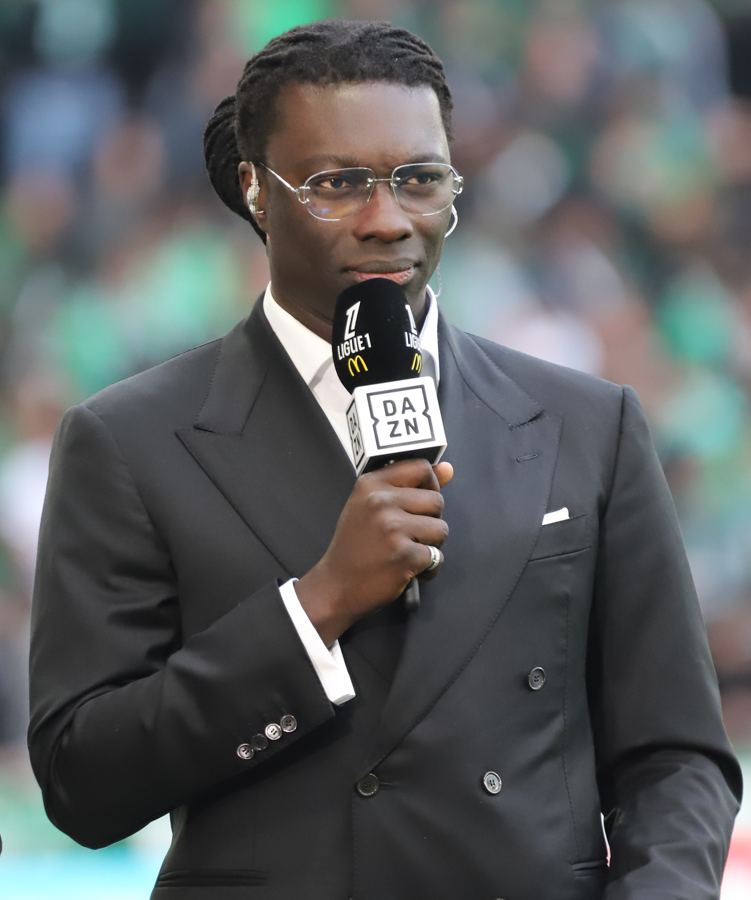
- Gomis in 2025

Personal information
- Full name: Bafétimbi Gomis
- Date of birth: 6 August 1985 (age 41)
- Place of birth: La Seyne-sur-Mer, France
- Height: 1.86 m (6 ft 1 in)
- Position: Striker

Youth career
- 1994–2000: Toulon Var
- 2000–2004: Saint-Étienne

Senior career*
Years	Team	Apps	(Gls)
2004–2009	Saint-Étienne	142	(40)
2005	→ Troyes (loan)	13	(6)
2009–2014	Lyon	178	(64)
2014–2017	Swansea City	64	(13)
2016–2017	→ Marseille (loan)	32	(20)
2017–2018	Galatasaray	34	(29)
2018–2022	Al-Hilal	106	(81)
2022–2023	Galatasaray	37	(17)
2023–2024	Kawasaki Frontale	17	(3)
Total		623	(273)

International career
2001	France U17	1	(0)
2008–2013	France	12	(3)
- * Club domestic league appearances and goals

Bafétimbi Gomis (born 6 August 1985) is a French former professional footballer who played as a striker.

Gomis played youth football with Saint-Étienne before making his professional debut for the club in 2004, also spending time on loan at Troyes in Ligue 2. In 2009, he joined Saint-Étienne's Derby du Rhone rivals Lyon for a fee of €13 million. Over five seasons at the Stade Gerland, he played 244 official matches and scored 95 goals, winning the Coupe de France and the Trophée des Champions in 2012. In 2014, he moved to Premier League club Swansea City on a free transfer. After a loan back in France at Marseille, he signed for Galatasaray, where he was top scorer as they won the Süper Lig in 2018. Gomis announced his professional retirement in 2024.

Gomis made twelve appearances for the France national team from 2008 to 2013, scoring three goals. He was a member of the squad for UEFA Euro 2008.

== Club career ==
=== Saint-Étienne ===
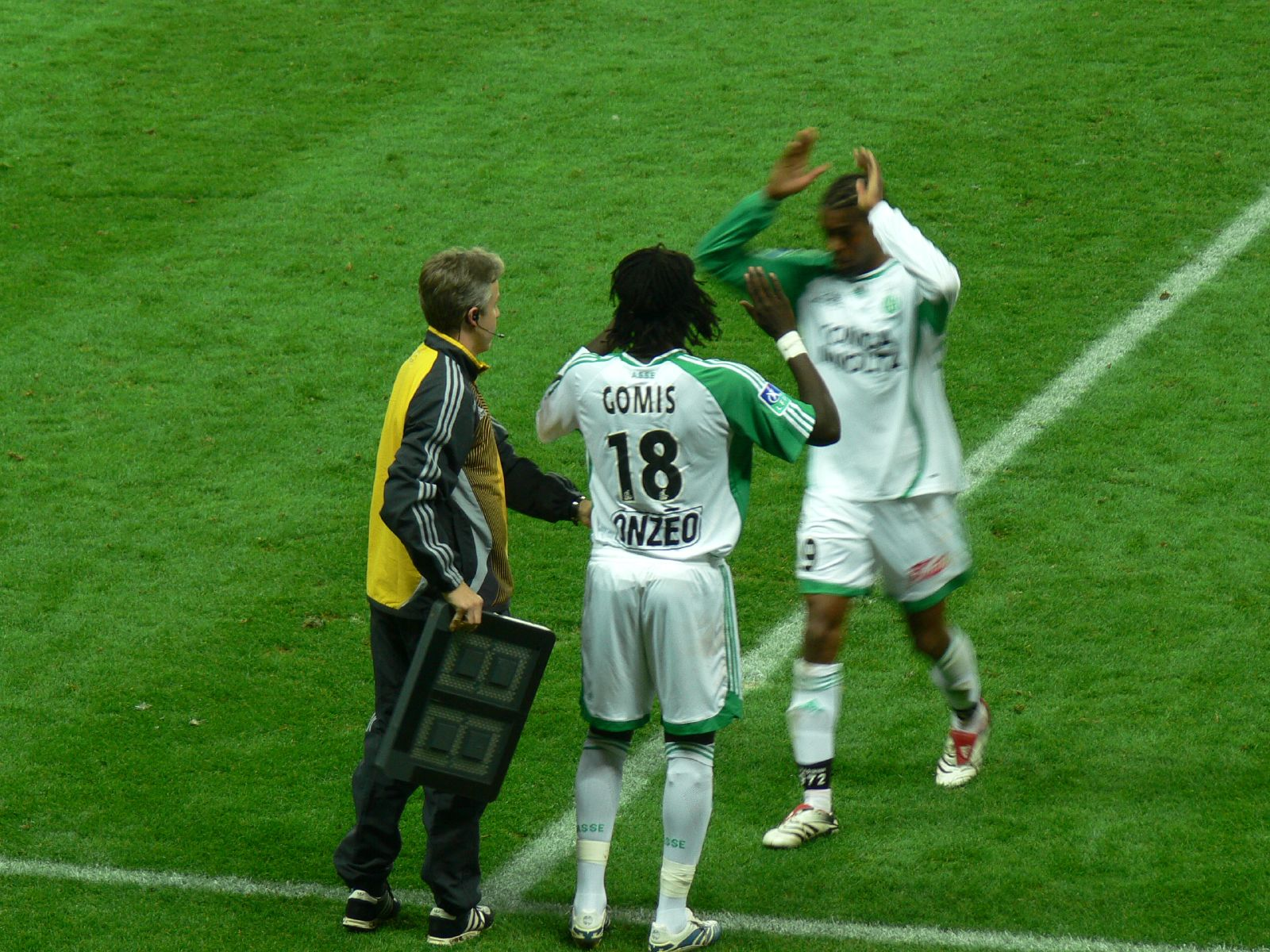
Gomis coming on as a substitute for Saint-Étienne

Born in La Seyne-sur-Mer, Var, Gomis made 13 appearances for Saint-Étienne in his first season with the club, scoring two league goals. In the next season, he made six goalless appearances for the club before going on loan to Troyes in a successful six-month loan deal, where he scored six goals in 13 matches. The 2005–06 season was not as successful as the previous season, as he made 24 league appearances for Saint-Étienne, scoring only two league goals.

The 2006–07 season was when Gomis established himself with Saint-Étienne, scoring ten goals in 30 appearances. Gomis continued this form into the 2007–08 season where he scored an impressive 16 goals in 34 appearances.

In the 2008 summer transfer window, Newcastle United under manager Kevin Keegan reportedly offered a transfer fee of £10 million for Gomis' services. However, a move did not materialise and Gomis remained at Saint-Étienne.

In an interview with French newspaper L'Équipe, Gomis stated he was attracted by a possible move to England, but revealed Serie A would be his preference. In the weeks leading up to the 2009 January transfer window, his name was again touted in speculation surrounding various Premier League sides, though he moved to allay the rumours, stating his desire to see out the Ligue 1 season with his current club.

Gomis' form in the 2008–09 season was scrutinized more heavily than it was in the previous season. Despite this, Gomis successfully netted five times in 17 league appearances, and excelled with his performances in the UEFA Cup, scoring three times in four matches.

=== Lyon ===
On 29 July 2009, Lyon announced that they had signed the striker for €13 million and the player had agreed to a five-year contract. With the move, Gomis became just the sixth player in French football history to transfer directly from Saint-Étienne to Derby du Rhône arch-rivals Lyon.

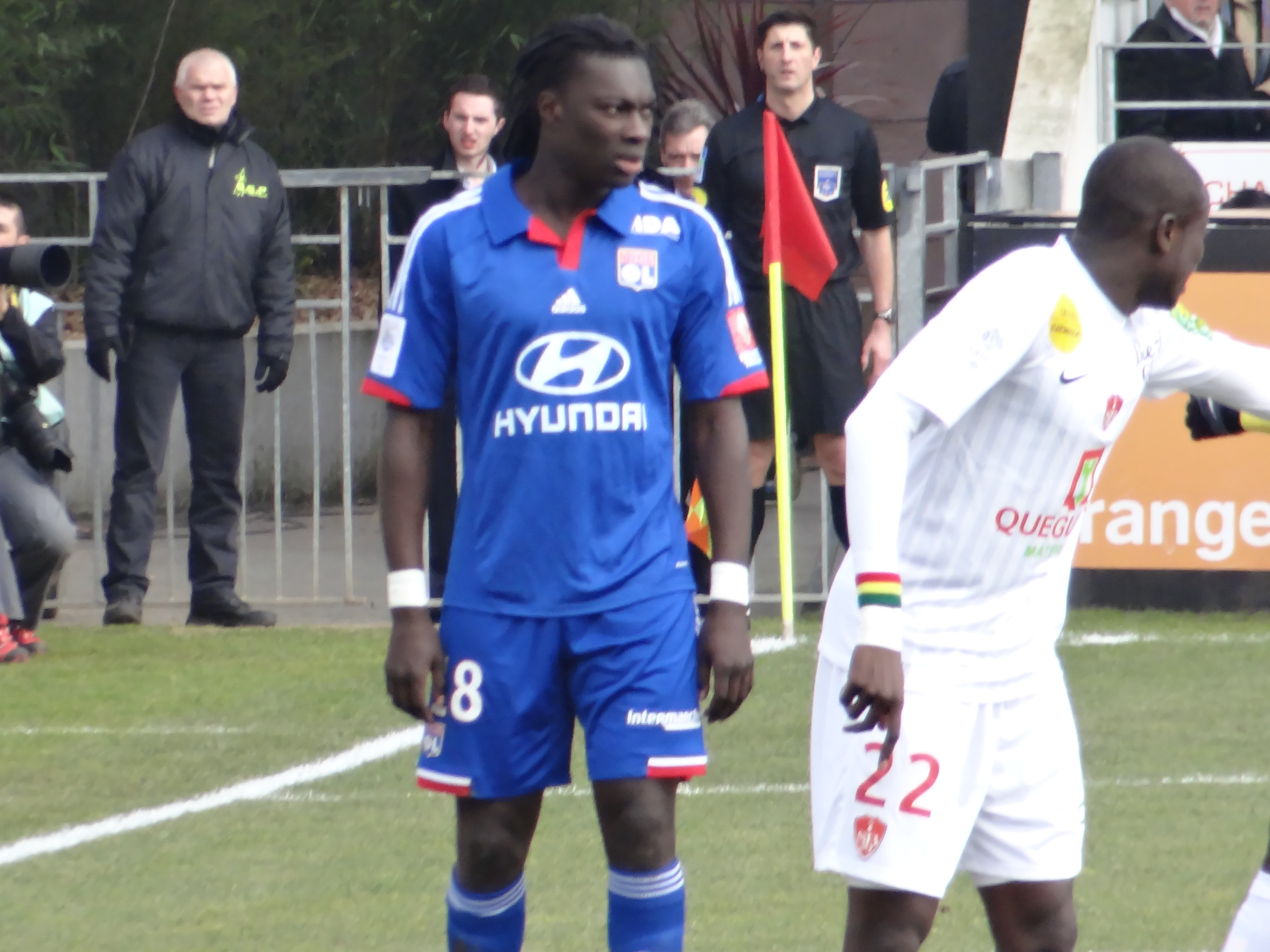
Gomis playing for Lyon against Brest in 2013

On the first day of the 2011–12 Ligue 1 campaign, Gomis scored the winning goal in a 3–1 victory over Nice on 6 August 2011. On 24 September, he scored a first-half brace against Bordeaux firing his side to a 3–1 away victory.

Gomis bagged four goals in the last round of the 2011–12 UEFA Champions League group stage, helping Lyon to a 7–1 victory over Dinamo Zagreb and progression to the Round of 16 on goal difference. He also created a new record for the fastest Champions League hat-trick ever scored, beating the record owned by Mike Newell. The record was later broken by Mohamed Salah in the 2022–23 UEFA Champions League group stage as Liverpool routed Rangers 7–1.

On 25 February 2012, Gomis scored on a volley to bring his side level with league leaders PSG 1–1; the match finished in a dramatic 4–4 draw, after Lyon was winning 4–2. He replaced Alexandre Lacazette in the 70th minute in a derby match against former club Saint-Étienne on 17 March, and ten minutes later scored a 30-yard strike to earn his side a 1–0 victory. He continued his rich vein of form against relegation-threatened Sochaux on 24 March when he converted an Anthony Réveillère cross to earn his side a 2–1 victory.

=== Swansea City ===
On 27 June 2014, Gomis signed a four-year contract at Swansea City after leaving Lyon at the end of the 2013–14 Ligue 1 season on a free transfer. He made his competitive debut in the opening match of the season on 16 August, replacing Wilfried Bony for the last 13 minutes of an eventual 2–1 win over Manchester United at Old Trafford. On 26 August he scored his first competitive goal for the club in a 1–0 victory over Rotherham United in the Second Round of the League Cup. Gomis scored his first Premier League goal on 9 November 2014 scoring the winner barely a minute after entering the field, as his side came from behind to beat Arsenal 2–1.

At the beginning of 2015, with Bony leaving to the 2015 Africa Cup of Nations Gomis became the main forward for the Swans, starting the year with a brace at Tranmere Rovers at Prenton Park in a 2–6 win in the FA Cup. On 10 January, after equalising in a 1–1 home draw against West Ham United, he displayed a French flag in support of victims of recent shootings in Paris. On 4 April 2015, Gomis scored in the 38th minute against Hull City with a volley and further sealed the victory by chipping the ball over the Hull City keeper giving him his first Premier League brace and Swansea City a 3–1 victory.

==== Loan to Marseille ====
On 29 July 2016, Gomis signed on loan to Marseille for the 2016–17 season. On 14 August, he made his debut in a 3–1 loss against Toulouse at the Stade Vélodrome. On 21 November, coach Rudi Garcia made him the captain of the squad for the remainder of the season.

Across all competitions, Gomis scored 21 goals in 33 matches for l'OM. This included a hat-trick on 27 January 2017 in a 5–1 win over Montpellier.

=== Galatasaray ===
On 28 June 2017, Gomis joined the Turkish club Galatasaray for an undisclosed fee. He was convinced to join by their former players and his friends, Didier Drogba and Aurélien Chedjou. He made his debut for the Istanbul-based club on 13 July in the first leg of the second qualifying round of the Europa League away to Östersunds, a 2–0 loss. On 14 August, he made his Süper Lig debut as his team opened the season with a 4–1 win over Kayserispor. Gomis scored twice and assisted Younès Belhanda. In a game against Akhisarspor on 9 December, Gomis equalised in a 4–2 comeback win at the Türk Telekom Stadium but was later given a red card.

On 23 February 2018, Gomis scored his first hat-trick in Turkey, in a 5–0 home win over Bursaspor. He added four more goals on 3 March in a 7–0 victory at Kardemir Karabükspor, between the 17th and 33rd minutes. He finished the campaign with 29 goals from 33 games, including the sole goal away to Göztepe to win the league title on the last day, making him the Gol Kralı (top scorer).

=== Al-Hilal ===
On 24 August 2018, Gomis signed for Saudi champions Al-Hilal, on a two-year deal for a €7 million fee. The club finished as runners-up to Riyadh rivals Al-Nassr due to a dip of form in the final stretch of the season from Gomis and the rest of the team. With 21 goals, he was joint second top scorer behind the rivals' Abderrazak Hamdallah.

Gomis scored 11 goals in the 2019 AFC Champions League, finishing the tournament as the top scorer, and contributing to winning the competition for Al-Hilal for the third time in 19 years. In the second leg of the 2019 AFC Champions League Final on 24 November, he scored the second goal in a 2–0 away win over Urawa Red Diamonds, which saw Al-Hilal win the title with a 3–0 aggregate victory; the title also allowed the team to qualify for the 2019 FIFA Club World Cup. Gomis was also awarded with the tournament MVP award for his role in delivering the title to Al-Hilal and became the first European player to be top scorer in the competition.

On 14 December, Gomis led Al-Hilal into the semi-finals of 2019 FIFA Club World Cup by scoring the only goal of the match against African champions Espérance de Tunis. On 21 December, he played in the second half of the third place game against CONCACAF champion Monterrey and scored a goal in the 64th minute that leveled the match 2–2. He also scored in the penalty shoot-out, but his team still lost the shoot-out 4–3. Overall, Gomis played three games in the Club World Cup and scored two goals.

=== Return to Galatasaray ===
On 2 February 2022, Galatasaray announced the signing of Gomis on a one-and-a-half-year deal. He finished the season by playing 16 matches and scoring nine goals.

Gomis became the champion in the Süper Lig in the 2022–23 season with Galatasaray. Defeating Ankaragücü 4–1 away in the match played in the 36th week on 30 May 2023, Galatasaray secured the lead with two weeks before the end and won the 23rd championship in its history.

On 8 June 2023, it was announced that he left Galatasaray and a thank you message was published.

=== Kawasaki Frontale ===
On 8 August 2023, two days after his 38th birthday, Gomis was announced as the new player of four-time J1 League champions, Kawasaki Frontale. Ten days later, he was assigned number 18 shirt, previously worn by Chanathip Songkrasin. This was also the number that Kaoru Mitoma once wore. He scored a hat-trick against Hokkaido Consadole Sapporo on 11 May 2024, which proved to be his only goals for the club. After 13 months, he left Kawasaki Frontale by mutual consent. He announced his retirement on 10 November 2024.

== International career ==
Born in France, Gomis was also eligible to play for Senegal through his ancestry. On 8 May 2008, he said regarding his international future: "I don't have to choose between the French or Senegalese teams, as I have not been called yet. The French team? It would be pretentious to ask for it, but I am not adverse to the French team."

On 18 May 2008, Gomis was called up for the provisional French UEFA Euro 2008 squad, ahead of experienced striker David Trezeguet, due to his particularly good form towards the end of Saint-Étienne's season. Gomis scored two goals in 26 minutes in a warm-up match against Ecuador on 27 May. He was the first player to score twice on his debut for the national team since Zinedine Zidane. On 28 May, he was selected in the French squad ahead of Marseille striker Djibril Cissé. On 9 June, Gomis won his third cap by coming on as a substitute for Nicolas Anelka in the scoreless draw against Romania. On 7 October 2009, he collapsed in the training for the match against the Faroe Islands.

In 2011, after a good start of the season with Lyon, Laurent Blanc called up Gomis for UEFA Euro 2012 qualification matches against Albania and Bosnia and Herzegovina.

== Personal life ==
Gomis has a medical condition, suspected to be reflex syncope, which means he is liable to faint during times of stress. This has caused him to faint during a number of matches.

He is the cousin of fellow footballers Nampalys Mendy and Alexandre Mendy.

== In popular culture ==
Gomis' iconic goal celebration is inspired by Salif Keïta. It is nicknamed "The Black Panther" and features in the FIFA video game series, first appearing in FIFA 17. An image of Gomis after his goal against Manchester United on 14 August 2015, captured by Getty Images Stuart Forster was nominated for football picture of the year at the Sports Journalism Awards.

== Career statistics ==
=== Club ===
Appearances and goals by club, season and competition
Club	Season	League			National cup (Note: Includes Coupe de France, FA Cup, Turkish Cup, King Cup, Emperor's Cup)		League cup (Note: Includes Coupe de la Ligue, Football League Cup)		Continental		Other		Total	
Club	Season	Division	Apps	Goals	Apps	Goals	Apps	Goals	Apps	Goals	Apps	Goals	Apps	Goals
Saint-Étienne	2003–04	Ligue 2	11	2	0	0	2	0	—		—		13	2
Saint-Étienne	2004–05	Ligue 1	6	0	1	0	0	0	—		—		7	0
Saint-Étienne	2005–06	Ligue 1	24	2	1	0	1	0	—		—		26	2
Saint-Étienne	2006–07	Ligue 1	30	10	1	0	3	3	—		—		34	13
Saint-Étienne	2007–08	Ligue 1	35	16	1	0	1	0	—		—		37	16
Saint-Étienne	2008–09	Ligue 1	36	10	2	1	1	1	8 (Note: Appearances in UEFA Cup)	4	—		47	16
Saint-Étienne	Total		142	40	6	1	8	4	8	4	—		164	49
Troyes (loan)	2004–05	Ligue 2	13	6	0	0	0	0	—		—		13	6
Lyon	2009–10	Ligue 1	37	10	2	1	2	0	10 (Note: Appearances in UEFA Champions League)	4	—		51	15
Lyon	2010–11	Ligue 1	35	10	2	0	1	0	7	2	—		45	12
Lyon	2011–12	Ligue 1	36	14	6	4	3	1	9	6	—		54	25
Lyon	2012–13	Ligue 1	37	16	1	1	1	1	5 (Note: Appearances in UEFA Europa League)	2	1 (Note: Appearance in Trophée des Champions)	1	45	21
Lyon	2013–14	Ligue 1	33	14	3	2	4	3	9	3	—		49	22
Lyon	Total		178	64	14	8	11	5	40	17	1	1	244	95
Swansea City	2014–15	Premier League	31	7	2	2	3	1	—		—		36	10
Swansea City	2015–16	Premier League	33	6	1	1	1	0	—		—		35	7
Swansea City	Total		64	13	3	3	4	1	—		—		71	17
Marseille (loan)	2016–17	Ligue 1	32	20	2	1	0	0	—		—		34	21
Galatasaray	2017–18	Süper Lig	33	29	5	3	—		2	0	—		40	32
Galatasaray	2018–19	Süper Lig	1	0	0	0	—		0	0	1 (Note: Appearance in Turkish Super Cup)	0	2	0
Galatasaray	Total		34	29	5	3	0	0	2	0	1	0	42	32
Al-Hilal	2018–19	Saudi Pro League	30	21	3	7	6	5	6 (Note: Appearances in AFC Champions League)	4	0	0	45	37
Al-Hilal	2019–20	Saudi Pro League	29	27	4	1	—		12	10	3 (Note: Appearances in FIFA Club World Cup)	2	48	40
Al-Hilal	2020–21	Saudi Pro League	30	24	1	0	—		10	6	1 (Note: Appearance in Saudi Super Cup)	0	42	30
Al-Hilal	2021–22	Saudi Pro League	17	9	1	0	—		—		1	0	19	9
Al-Hilal	Total		106	81	9	8	6	5	28	20	5	2	154	116
Galatasaray	2021–22	Süper Lig	14	9	—		—		2	0	—		16	9
Galatasaray	2022–23	Süper Lig	23	8	5	2	—		—		—		28	10
Galatasaray	Total		37	17	5	2	—		2	0	—		44	19
Kawasaki Frontale	2023	J1 League	8	0	1	0	—		5	0	—		14	0
Kawasaki Frontale	2024	J1 League	9	3	0	0	0	0	0	0	1 (Note: Appearance in Japanese Super Cup)	0	10	3
Kawasaki Frontale	Total		17	3	1	0	0	0	5	0	1	0	24	3
Career total			623	273	45	26	29	15	85	41	7	3	790	358

=== International ===
Appearances and goals by national team and year
National team	Year	Apps	Goals
France	2008	4	2
France	2009	1	0
France	2011	1	0
France	2012	4	1
France	2013	2	0
Total		12	3

Scores and results list France's goal tally first, score column indicates score after each Gomis goal

List of international goals scored by Bafétimbi Gomis
No.	Date	Venue	Cap	Opponent	Score	Result	Competition
1	27 May 2008	Stade des Alpes, Grenoble, France	1	Ecuador	1–0	2–0	Friendly
2	27 May 2008	Stade des Alpes, Grenoble, France	1	Ecuador	2–0	2–0	Friendly
3	14 November 2012	Stadio Ennio Tardini, Parma, Italy	10	Italy	2–1	2–1	Friendly

== Honours ==
Saint-Étienne

- Ligue 2: 2003–04

Lyon

- Coupe de France: 2011–12
- Trophée des Champions: 2012

Galatasaray

- Süper Lig: 2017–18, 2022–23

Al-Hilal

- Saudi Pro League: 2019–20, 2020–21
- King's Cup: 2019–20
- Saudi Super Cup: 2021
- AFC Champions League: 2019, 2021

Kawasaki Frontale

- Emperor's Cup: 2023
- Japanese Super Cup: 2024

Individual

- UNFP Player of the Month: January 2007
- Süper Lig Player of the Season: 2017–18
- Süper Lig Forward of the Season: 2017–18
- Süper Lig Team of the Season: 2017–18
- Gol Kralı: 2017–18
- Saudi Professional League Player of the Month: February 2019
- AFC Champions League Top scorer: 2019
- AFC Champions League Most Valuable Player: 2019
- AFC Champions League Fans' Best XI: 2019
- AFC Champions League OPTA Best XI: 2019
- Saudi Professional League Top Goalscorer: 2020–21
