= Sai van Wermeskerken =

Dutch-Japanese footballer

Personal information
- Date of birth: 28 June 1994 (age 32)
- Place of birth: Maastricht, Netherlands
- Height: 1.78 m (5 ft 10 in)
- Position: Right-back

Team information
- Current team: Ratchaburi
- Number: 31

Youth career
- 2002–2008: Yatsugatake Hokuto
- 2008–2013: Ventforet Kofu
- 2013–2015: Dordrecht

Senior career*
Years	Team	Apps	(Gls)
2015–2017	Dordrecht	64	(1)
2017–2019	Cambuur	66	(1)
2019–2022	PEC Zwolle	47	(0)
2022–2023	Cambuur	24	(1)
2023–2024	NEC Nijmegen	3	(0)
2024–2025	Kawasaki Frontale	50	(1)
2026–	Ratchaburi	4	(0)

International career
2016	Japan U23	5	(0)
- * Club domestic league appearances and goals as of 13 October 2026

Sai van Wermeskerken (ファン ウェルメスケルケン 際, Fan Werumesukeruken Sai; born 28 June 1994) is a professional footballer who plays as a right-back for Thai League 1 side Ratchaburi. Born in the Netherlands, he is a former youth international for Japan.

== Club career ==
=== Early career ===
Van Wermeskerken was born in Maastricht, Netherlands, to a Dutch father and a Japanese mother. He moved to Japan at the age of 2 due to his father's work. The family settled in Yamanashi Prefecture. Van Wermeskerken started his career at Yatsugatake Hokuto at age eight, before joining Ventforet Kofu youth academy in 2008.

=== Dordrecht ===
After several years in the Kofu youth system, van Wermeskerken was rewarded with a contract by Dordrecht in July 2013. He made his first appearance for Dordrecht on 10 May 2015, in the Eredivisie match against Twente.

=== SC Cambuur ===
On 21 August 2017, van Wermeskerken signed for SC Cambuur.

=== PEC Zwolle ===
On 9 July 2019, van Wermeskerken signed a two-year deal for Eredivisie side PEC Zwolle on a free transfer.

=== Return to Cambuur ===
On 10 August 2022, van Wermeskerken returned to Cambuur for one season.

=== NEC Nijmegen ===
On 27 October 2023, van Wermeskerken joined Eredivisie side NEC Nijmegen, signing a contract until the end of the 2023–24 season.

=== Kawasaki Frontale ===
On 21 January 2024, NEC announced van Wermeskerken's transfer to Japanese club Kawasaki Frontale. He made a substitute appearance in the 2025 AFC Champions League Elite final in a 2–0 defeat to Al-Ahli, as well as starting in the semi-final against an Al Nassr side including Cristiano Ronaldo.

In December 2025, van Wermeskerken's contract expired and he left the club.

== International career ==
On 14 March 2016, Sai received his first call-up to the Japan national under-23 football team for the friendly match against Mexico.

== Honours ==
=== Club ===
Kawasaki Frontale

- Japanese Super Cup: 2024
