= 2024 Japanese Super Cup =

Vissel Kobe	Kawasaki Frontale
0	1
- Date: 17 February 2024
- Venue: Japan National Stadium, Shinjuku, Tokyo
- Referee: Akihiko Ikeuchi
- Attendance: 52,142
- Weather: Fine; 13 °C (55 °F); 33% humidity

The 2024 Japanese Super Cup (known as Fujifilm Super Cup 2024 for sponsorship reasons) was the 31st Japanese Super Cup since its reestablishment, and the 39th overall. It was held on 17 February 2024 between the 2023 J1 League champions Vissel Kobe and the 2023 Emperor's Cup winners Kawasaki Frontale at the Japan National Stadium, Shinjuku, Tokyo.

Kawasaki Frontale defeated one-time winners Vissel Kobe 1–0 to win their third Japanese Super Cup.

== Details ==
17 February 2024
13:35 JST

Vissel Kobe	0–1	Kawasaki Frontale
	Report	Van Wermeskerken 48'

Japan National Stadium, Tokyo
Attendance: 52,142
Referee: Akihiko Ikeuchi

Vissel Kobe	Kawasaki Frontale

GK	1	(Japan) Daiya Maekawa
RB	24	(Japan) Gōtoku Sakai
CB	4	(Japan) Tetsushi Yamakawa
CB	3	(Brazil) Matheus Thuler
LB	19	(Japan) Ryo Hatsuse		(substituted off) 83'
DM	6	(Japan) Takahiro Ohgihara	(yellow card) 67'	(substituted off) 70'
CM	96	(Japan) Hotaru Yamaguchi (c)
CM	18	(Japan) Haruya Ide		(substituted off) 21'
RF	22	(Japan) Daiju Sasaki
CF	10	(Japan) Yuya Osako
LF	26	(Brazil) Jean Patric		(substituted off) 70'
Substitutes:
GK	21	(Japan) Shota Arai
DF	23	(Japan) Rikuto Hirose		(substituted in) 70'
DF	55	(Japan) Takuya Iwanami
DF	81	(Japan) Ryuho Kikuchi
MF	2	(Japan) Nanasei Iino		(substituted in) 83'
MF	7	(Japan) Yosuke Ideguchi		(substituted in) 70'
FW	9	(Japan) Taisei Miyashiro		(substituted in) 21'
Manager:
(Japan) Takayuki Yoshida

GK	99	(Japan) Naoto Kamifukumoto
RB	31	(Japan) Sai van Wermeskerken		(substituted off) 80'
CB	2	(Japan) Kota Takai
CB	35	(Japan) Yuichi Maruyama
LB	15	(Japan) Shuto Tanabe	(yellow card) 15'	(substituted off) 46'
DM	6	(Brazil) Zé Ricardo
CM	16	(Japan) Tatsuki Seko (c)		(substituted off) 85'
CM	26	(Japan) Hinata Yamauchi		(substituted off) 80'
RF	20	(Japan) Shin Yamada
CF	18	(France) Bafétimbi Gomis	(yellow card) 25'
LF	28	(Brazil) Patrick Verhon		(substituted off) 65'
Substitutes:
GK	21	(Japan) Shunsuke Ando
DF	13	(Japan) Sota Miura		(substituted in) 46'
MF	8	(Japan) Kento Tachibanada	(yellow card) 90+3'	(substituted in) 80'
MF	25	(Japan) Renji Matsui
MF	30	(Japan) Yusuke Segawa		(substituted in) 80'
MF	77	(Japan) Yuki Yamamoto		(substituted in) 85'
FW	23	(Brazil) Marcinho		(substituted in) 65'
Manager:
(Japan) Toru Oniki

Assistant referees:
Jun Mihara
Tomoyuki Umeda
Fourth official:
Hayato Shimizu
Video assistant referee:
Yudai Yamamoto
Assistant video assistant referee:
Makoto Hibino

Match rules

- 90 minutes.
- Penalty shoot-out if scores still level.
- Seven named substitutes.
- Maximum of five substitutions, and a maximum of two additional concussion substitutions.

== See also ==
- 2024 J1 League
- 2024 Emperor's Cup
- 2024 J.League Cup
