= César Haydar =

Colombian footballer (born 2001)

Personal information
- Full name: César Rafael Haydar Villarreal
- Date of birth: 31 March 2001 (age 25)
- Place of birth: Suán, Colombia
- Height: 1.83 m (6 ft 0 in)
- Position: Centre-back

Team information
- Current team: Atlético Nacional
- Number: 4

Youth career
- Barranquilla

Senior career*
Years	Team	Apps	(Gls)
2018–2019	Barranquilla	16	(0)
2019–2020	Atlético Junior	8	(0)
2020–2024	Red Bull Bragantino	3	(0)
2022–2023	→ Atlético Junior (loan)	33	(2)
2023–2024	→ Deportes Tolima (loan)	28	(1)
2024	→ Kawasaki Frontale (loan)	2	(0)
2025–	Kawasaki Frontale	0	(0)
2025–	→ Atlético Nacional (loan)	9	(0)

International career
2019	Colombia U20	2	(0)
- * Club domestic league appearances and goals as of 11 December 2025

César Rafael Haydar Villarreal (born 31 March 2001) is a Colombian professional footballer who plays as a centre-back for Colombian club Atlético Nacional, on loan from Japanese club Kawasaki Frontale.

== Club career ==
Haydar was born in Suán, Atlántico Department, and started his career with local side Asefusa FC. In 2018, he joined Atlético Junior and was immediately assigned to their reserve team, Barranquilla FC, in the Categoría Primera B.

Haydar made his senior debut on 1 August 2018, starting in a 1–1 away draw against Cúcuta Deportivo. After having been promoted to the first team the following March, he made his Categoría Primera A debut on 30 March 2019, playing the full 90 minutes in a 1–1 draw at Jaguares de Córdoba.

On 30 July 2024, Haydar moved abroad to Japan for the first time and was loaned to J1 club Kawasaki Frontale for the second half of the 2024 season. On 4 September, he played the whole 90 minutes in a J.League Cup match against Ventforet Kofu, marking his first appearance for the club.

On 6 January 2025, Haydar was transferred to Kawasaki Frontale on a permanent deal for the 2025 season after half a season in loan. On 18 July 2025, Haydar was loaned to Colombian club Atlético Nacional.

== Personal life ==
Haydar is of Lebanese descent. His uncle, Alberto, was also a footballer and a defender, who played for Junior in the 1990s and died in 2015.

== Career statistics ==
=== Club ===
As of the start for 2025 season.

Appearances and goals by club, season and competition
Club	Season	League			National cup		Continental		Other		Total	
Club	Season	Division	Apps	Goals	Apps	Goals	Apps	Goals	Apps	Goals	Apps	Goals
Barranquilla	2018	Categoría Primera B	12	0	—		—		—		12	0
Barranquilla	2019	Categoría Primera B	4	0	3	0	—		—		7	0
Barranquilla	Total		16	0	3	0	—		—		19	0
Atlético Junior	2019	Categoría Primera A	7	0	1	0	—		—		8	0
Atlético Junior	2020	Categoría Primera A	1	0	—		0	0	0	0	1	0
Atlético Junior	Total		8	0	1	0	0	0	0	0	9	0
Red Bull Bragantino	2020	Série A	1	0	0	0	—		—		1	0
Red Bull Bragantino	2021	Série A	2	0	0	0	0	0	—		2	0
Red Bull Bragantino	2022	Série A	0	0	—		0	0	0	0	0	0
Red Bull Bragantino	Total		3	0	0	0	0	0	0	0	3	0
Atlético Junior (loan)	2022	Categoría Primera A	14	1	6	1	—		—		20	2
Atlético Junior (loan)	2023	Categoría Primera A	4	0	—		0	0	—		4	0
Atlético Junior (loan)	Total		18	1	6	1	0	0	—		24	2
Deportes Tolima (loan)	2023	Categoría Primera A	24	0	2	1	—		—		26	1
Deportes Tolima (loan)	2024	Categoría Primera A	6	0	—		0	0	—		6	0
Deportes Tolima (loan)	Total		30	0	2	1	0	0	—		32	1
Kawasaki Frontale (loan)	2024	J1 League	2	0	—		1 (Note: Appearance(s) in AFC Champions League Elite)	0	3 (Note: Appearance(s) in J.League Cup)	0	6	0
Kawasaki Frontale	2025	J1 League	0	0	0	0	—		0	0	0	0
Career Total			77	1	12	2	0	0	3	0	92	3
