= Kōta Takai =

Japanese footballer (born 2004)

Kōta Takai 高井 幸大
Personal information
- Full name: Kōta Takai
- Date of birth: 4 September 2004 (age 22)
- Place of birth: Tsurumi-ku, Yokohama, Kanagawa, Japan
- Height: 1.92 m (6 ft 4 in)
- Position: Centre-back

Team information
- Current team: Sint-Truidense (on loan from Tottenham Hotspur)
- Number: 4

Youth career
- 2009–2011: River FC
- 2011–2022: Kawasaki Frontale

Senior career*
Years	Team	Apps	(Gls)
2022–2025	Kawasaki Frontale	60	(4)
2025–	Tottenham Hotspur	0	(0)
2026	→ Borussia Mönchengladbach (loan)	8	(0)
2026–	→ Sint-Truidense VV (loan)	3	(0)

International career^{‡}
2019	Japan U15	1	(0)
2022–2023	Japan U20	1	(0)
2023–2024	Japan U23	7	(1)
2024–	Japan	4	(0)
Medal record
Men's football
Representing Japan
AFC U-23 Asian Cup
Gold medal – first place	2024 Qatar	Team
- * Club domestic league appearances and goals as of 3 November 2026 ‡ National team caps and goals as of 28 June 2025

Kōta Takai (高井 幸大, Takai Kōta; born 4 September 2004) is a Japanese professional footballer who plays as a centre-back for Belgian Pro League club Sint-Truidense, on loan from Premier League club Tottenham Hotspur, and the Japan national team.

== Club career ==
=== Kawasaki Frontale ===
Takai was promoted to the Kawasaki Frontale first team ahead of the 2022 season. He made his debut in a 8–0 victory against Guangzhou. At the end of the 2024 J1 League season, Takai was named the J.League's Best Young Player of 2024. He would help Frontale win the 2023 Emperor's Cup and 2024 Japanese Super Cup as well as making it to the 2025 AFC Champions League Elite final for the first time in club history.

=== Tottenham Hotspur ===
On 8 July 2025, Takai agreed to join Premier League club Tottenham Hotspur on a permanent transfer until 2030. Takai's start to life at Tottenham was delayed after being diagnosed with plantar fasciitis, causing him to miss pre-season and the first matches of the season, returning to training in early September. Takai would play his first minutes for Tottenham with the U21s in a Behind closed doors friendly against Dagenham & Redbridge on 2 December, later making his first matchday squad in a 1–0 away win against Crystal Palace on 28 December.

==== Loans to Borussia Mönchengladbach and Sint-Truidense ====
On 2 January 2026, Takai joined Bundesliga club Borussia Mönchengladbach on loan for the remainder of the 2025–26 season. He made his debut on 11 January 2026 in the 72nd minute as a substitute for Philipp Sander in a 4–0 home win over FC Augsburg.

On 1 September 2026, he joined Belgian Pro League club Sint-Truidense on loan.

== International career ==
On 4 April 2024, Takai was called up to the Japan U23 squad for the 2024 AFC U-23 Asian Cup. The same year on 5 September, Takai debuted for Japan national team in a 2026 World Cup qualification against China at the Saitama Stadium 2002, replacing Ko Itakura in the 71st minute of Japan's 7–0 victory.

== Career statistics ==
=== Club ===
As of match played 25 April 2026

Appearances and goals by club, season and competition
Club	Season	League			National cup (Note: Includes Emperor's Cup, Belgian Cup)		League cup (Note: Includes J.League Cup)		Continental		Other		Total	
Club	Season	Division	Apps	Goals	Apps	Goals	Apps	Goals	Apps	Goals	Apps	Goals	Apps	Goals
Kawasaki Frontale	2022	J1 League	0	0	0	0	0	0	1 (Note: Appearance(s) in AFC Champions League (Elite))	0	—		1	0
Kawasaki Frontale	2023	J1 League	14	0	4	0	3	0	2	0	—		23	0
Kawasaki Frontale	2024	J1 League	24	2	0	0	0	0	4	0	1 (Note: Appearance in Japanese Super Cup)	0	29	2
Kawasaki Frontale	2025	J1 League	22	2	0	0	0	0	6	0	—		28	2
Kawasaki Frontale	Total		60	4	4	0	3	0	13	0	1	0	81	4
Tottenham Hotspur	2025–26	Premier League	0	0	0	0	0	0	0	0	0	0	0	0
Borussia Mönchengladbach (loan)	2025–26	Bundesliga	8	0	—		—		—		—		8	0
Sint-Truidense (loan)	2026–27	Belgian Pro League	0	0	0	0	—		0	0	—		0	0
Career total			68	4	4	0	3	0	13	0	1	0	89	4

=== International ===
As of match played 10 June 2025

Appearances and goals by national team and year
National team	Year	Apps	Goals
Japan	2024	1	0
Japan	2025	3	0
Total		4	0

== Honours ==
Kawasaki Frontale

- Japanese Super Cup: 2024
- Emperor's Cup: 2023

Japan U23

- AFC U-23 Asian Cup: 2024

Individual

- J.League Best Young Player: 2024
