= Naoto Kamifukumoto =

Japanese footballer (born 1989)

Naoto Kamifukumoto 上福元 直人
Personal information
- Full name: Naoto Kamifukumoto
- Date of birth: November 17, 1989 (age 36)
- Place of birth: Wakaba-ku, Chiba, Japan
- Height: 1.82 m (6 ft 0 in)
- Position: Goalkeeper

Team information
- Current team: Shonan Bellmare
- Number: 99

Youth career
- Kitakaizuka FC
- Chiba SC Niihama
- 2005–2007: Ichiritsu Funabashi High School

College career
Years	Team	Apps	(Gls)
2008–2011	Juntendo University		

Senior career*
Years	Team	Apps	(Gls)
2012–2017	Oita Trinita	65	(0)
2013	→ Machida Zelvia (loan)	0	(0)
2018–2019	Tokyo Verdy	84	(0)
2020–2021	Tokushima Vortis	37	(0)
2021–2022	Kyoto Sanga	65	(0)
2023–2024	Kawasaki Frontale	20	(0)
2024–	Shonan Bellmare	47	(0)
- * Club domestic league appearances and goals as of 14 August 2026

Naoto Kamifukumoto (上福元 直人, Kamifukumoto Naoto; born November 17, 1989) is a Japanese footballer who plays as a goalkeeper for J1 League club Shonan Bellmare.

== Career ==
After four years at Juntendo University, Kamifukumoto first became a Special Designated Player, then a regular for Oita Trinita in 2012. He was first loaned to FC Machida Zelvia, but he never had a chance to play as a professional athlete until 2015.

During his first season as a field player, he appeared nine times on the playing field. However, Oita Trinita was relegated to the J3 League. His role model as a player is Iker Casillas.

== Club statistics ==
As of start of the 2023 season.

Club performance			League		Cup		League Cup		Other		Total	
Season	Club	League	Apps	Goals	Apps	Goals	Apps	Goals	Apps	Goals	Apps	Goals
Japan			League		Emperor's Cup		J.League Cup				Total	
2012	Oita Trinita	J2 League	0	0	–		–		–		0	0
2012	Oita Trinita	J1 League	0	0	0	0	–		–		0	0
2013	Machida Zelvia	JFL	0	0	–		–		–		0	0
2014	Oita Trinita	J2 League	0	0	0	0	–		–		0	0
2015	Oita Trinita	J2 League	8	0	1	0	–		–		9	0
2016	Oita Trinita	J3 League	19	0	2	0	–		–		21	0
2017	Oita Trinita	J2 League	38	0	0	0	–		–		38	0
2018	Tokyo Verdy	J2 League	42	0	0	0	–		3 (Note: J1/J2 promotion play-offs)	0	45	0
2019	Tokyo Verdy	J2 League	42	0	0	0	–		–		42	0
2020	Tokushima Vortis	J2 League	37	0	2	0	–		–		39	0
2021	Kyoto Sanga	J1 League	34	0	0	0	0	0	–		34	0
2022	Kyoto Sanga	J1 League	31	0	0	0	2	0	1	0	34	0
2023	Kawasaki Frontale	J1 League	0	0	0	0	0	0	–		34	0
Total			251	0	5	0	2	0	4	0	262	0

== Honours ==
=== Club ===
Kawasaki Frontale

- Emperor's Cup: 2023
- Japanese Super Cup: 2024
