= Patrick Verhon =

Brazilian footballer (born 2002)

Personal information
- Full name: Patrick Verhon Pertel Pereira
- Date of birth: 8 September 2004 (age 22)
- Place of birth: Serra, Brazil
- Height: 1.73 m (5 ft 8 in)
- Position: Midfielder

Team information
- Current team: Oita Trinita (on loan from Kawasaki Frontale)
- Number: 18

Youth career
- 2017–2023: Bahia

Senior career*
Years	Team	Apps	(Gls)
2022–2023	Bahia	9	(0)
2024–	Kawasaki Frontale	4	(0)
2025	FC Imabari (loan)	7	(2)
2026–	Oita Trinita (loan)	9	(2)
- * Club domestic league appearances and goals as of 16 August 2026

Patrick Verhon Pertel Pereira (born 8 September 2004), known as Patrick Verhon, is a Brazilian professional footballer who plays as a midfielder for J2 League club Oita Trinita.

== Club career ==
Born in Serra, Espírito Santo, Patrick Verhon joined Bahia's youth sides at the age of 12, after a trial in his hometown. In July 2022, he was included in the first team squad after a request by head coach Enderson Moreira.

Patrick Verhon made his professional debut on 29 July 2022, coming on as a late substitute for Hugo Rodallega in a 3–0 Série B home win over Náutico. He appeared in another three matches for the club during the year, as they achieved promotion to the Série A.

Patrick Verhon made his top tier debut on 8 July 2023, replacing Kayky late into a 1–1 away draw against Cuiabá.

== Career statistics ==
As of 9 July 2023.

Club	Season	League			State League (Note: Includes Campeonato Baiano.)		Cup (Note: Includes Copa do Brasil.)		Continental		Other (Note: Includes Copa do Nordeste.)		Total	
Club	Season	Division	Apps	Goals	Apps	Goals	Apps	Goals	Apps	Goals	Apps	Goals	Apps	Goals
Bahia	2022	Série B	4	0	—		0	0	—		—		4	0
Bahia	2023	Série A	1	0	1	0	1	0	—		3	0	6	0
Career total			5	0	1	0	1	0	0	0	3	0	10	0

== Honours ==
Bahia

- Campeonato Baiano: 2023

Kawasaki Frontale

- Japanese Super Cup: 2024
