= Suan, Atlántico =

Coordinates: 10°20′N 74°53′W

Suán
- Municipality and town
- Flag Coat of arms

- Location of the municipality and town of Suán in the Department of Atlántico.
- Country: Colombia
- Region: Caribbean
- Department: Atlántico

Government
  - Mayor: Rodolfo Pacheco (Party of the U)

Population (2005)
  - Total: 9,344
- Time zone: UTC-5 (Colombia Standard Time)
- Website: www.suan-atlantico.gov.co/sitio.shtml

Suan is a municipality and town in the Colombian department of Atlántico.
