= Louis Yamaguchi =

Japanese footballer (born 1998)

Louis Thébault-Yamaguchi 山口 瑠伊
Personal information
- Full name: Louis Takaji Julien Thébault-Yamaguchi
- Date of birth: 28 May 1998 (age 28)
- Place of birth: La Garenne-Colombes, France
- Height: 1.88 m (6 ft 2 in)
- Position: Goalkeeper

Team information
- Current team: Kawasaki Frontale
- Number: 1

Youth career
- FC Waseda
- 2011–2014: FC Tokyo
- 2014–2017: Lorient

Senior career*
Years	Team	Apps	(Gls)
2017–2019	Extremadura B	33	(0)
2019–2020	Extremadura	1	(0)
2020–2021	Recreativo	4	(0)
2022–2023	Mito HollyHock	63	(0)
2024	Machida Zelvia	0	(0)
2024	→ Kawasaki Frontale (loan)	0	(0)
2025–	Kawasaki Frontale	40	(0)

International career
2016	Japan U19	4	(0)
2017	Japan U20	1	(0)
2018–2019	Japan U23	4	(0)
- * Club domestic league appearances and goals as of 1 August 2026

Louis Takaji Julien Thébault-Yamaguchi (Japanese: 山口 瑠伊, born 28 May 1998) is a footballer who plays as a goalkeeper for J1 League club Kawasaki Frontale. Born in France, he is a former youth international for Japan.

== Club career ==
Born in La Garenne-Colombes, Paris to a French father and a Japanese mother, Thébault-Yamaguchi moved to Tokyo at six months old, and returned to France at the age of 16, joining FC Lorient's youth setup. On 16 June 2017, after finishing his formation, he moved to Spanish Segunda División B side Extremadura UD, being initially assigned to the reserves.

Thébault-Yamaguchi made his professional debut on 3 September 2017, starting in a 1–0 Tercera División home lost against UD Montijo. He became a regular starter for the B-side during the following seasons, and ahead of the 2019–20 campaign, he was definitely promoted to the first team as a backup to Casto.

Thébault-Yamaguchi made his professional debut on 3 November 2019, starting in a 3–1 home loss against Girona FC in the Segunda División. He left the club in the following July, as his contract expired, and joined Recreativo de Huelva in the third division on 11 August.

After leaving Recreativo in July 2021, Thébault-Yamaguchi signed with J2 League club Mito HollyHock in January 2022. He made his club debut in a 2–1 loss to Thespakusatsu Gunma as the team's starting goalkeeper, replacing Shu Mogi.

In January 2024, Thébault-Yamaguchi joined newly promoted J1 League club FC Machida Zelvia. He appeared in one match, a 1–1 (2–4) penalty shootout loss to the fifth-division University of Tsukuba team in the Emperor's Cup, before being sent on loan to Kawasaki Frontale. Yamaguchi made his club debut for Frontale in the J.League Cup quarter-finals, keeping a clean sheet in a 1-0 win against Ventforet Kofu.

In December, it was announced that Thébault-Yamaguchi would be permanently transferred to Kawasaki Frontale. He began Frontale's 2025 campaign as their starting goalkeeper, in the process making his J1 League and AFC Champions League debuts, which were both clean sheet victories. Yamaguchi kept his starting position throughout Frontale's run to the 2025 AFC Champions League Elite final, a 2–0 defeat to Al-Ahli.

== International career ==
Yamaguchi represented Japan at under-19, under-20 and under-23 levels. He was a member of the Japanese squad at the 2017 FIFA U-20 World Cup, and the squad that finished runners-up in the 2019 Toulon Tournament.

== Honours ==
Kawasaki Frontale

- AFC Champions League Elite runner-up: 2024-25
