= So Kawahara =

Japanese footballer (born 1998)

So Kawahara 河原 創
Personal information
- Date of birth: 13 March 1998 (age 28)
- Place of birth: Yamaga, Kumamoto, Japan
- Height: 1.69 m (5 ft 7 in)
- Position: Midfielder

Team information
- Current team: Kawasaki Frontale
- Number: 19

Youth career
- Yamaga FCJ
- Roasso Kumamoto
- Sorriso Kumamoto
- JFA Academy Kumamoto Uki
- 2013–2015: Ohzu High School

College career
Years	Team	Apps	(Gls)
2016–2019	Fukuoka University		

Senior career*
Years	Team	Apps	(Gls)
2020–2022	Roasso Kumamoto	104	(5)
2023–2024	Sagan Tosu	42	(1)
2024–	Kawasaki Frontale	64	(3)
- * Club domestic league appearances and goals as of 1 August 2026

So Kawahara (河原 創, Kawahara So; born 13 March 1998) is a Japanese professional footballer who plays as a midfielder for J1 League club Kawasaki Frontale.

== Career statistics ==
As of 27 March 2023.

Appearances and goals by club, season and competition
Club	Season	League			Emperor's Cup		J. League Cup		Other		Total	
Club	Season	Division	Apps	Goals	Apps	Goals	Apps	Goals	Apps	Goals	Apps	Goals
Roasso Kumamoto	2020	J3 League	34	3	0	0	–		–		34	3
Roasso Kumamoto	2021	J3 League	28	1	2	1	–		–		30	2
Roasso Kumamoto	2022	J2 League	42	1	2	2	–		3 (Note: Appearances in J1 and J2 play-offs)	0	47	3
Roasso Kumamoto	Total		104	5	4	3	0	0	3	0	111	8
Sagan Tosu	2023	J1 League	5	0	0	0	2	0	–		7	0
Career total			109	5	4	3	2	0	3	0	118	8

== Honours ==
Individual

- J2 League Best XI: 2022
