= Sota Miura =

Japanese footballer (born 2000)

Sota Miura 三浦 颯太
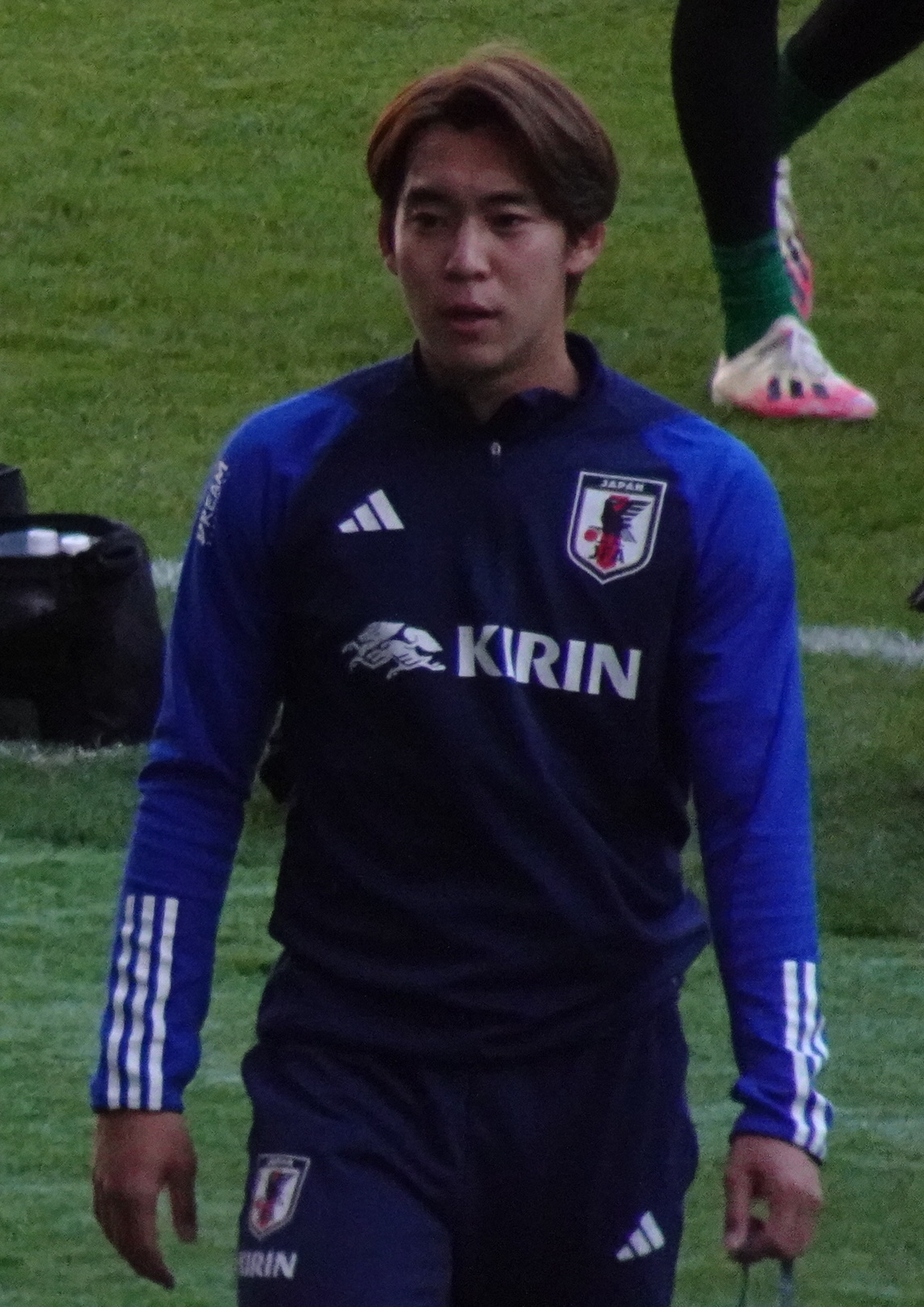

Personal information
- Full name: Sota Miura
- Date of birth: 7 September 2000 (age 26)
- Place of birth: Akishima, Tokyo, Japan
- Height: 1.78 m (5 ft 10 in)
- Position: Left back

Team information
- Current team: Kawasaki Frontale
- Number: 13

Youth career
- 2007–2012: FC Gauloises
- 2013–2015: FC Tokyo
- 2016–2018: Teikyo High School

College career
Years	Team	Apps	(Gls)
2019–2022	Nippon Sport Science University		

Senior career*
Years	Team	Apps	(Gls)
2022–2023	Ventforet Kofu	26	(0)
2024–	Kawasaki Frontale	64	(1)

International career^{‡}
2024–	Japan	1	(0)
- * Club domestic league appearances and goals as of 1 August 2026 ‡ National team caps and goals as of 1 January 2024

Sota Miura (三浦 颯太, Miura Sota; born 7 September 2000) is a Japanese professional footballer who plays as a left back for J1 League club Kawasaki Frontale and the Japan national team.

== Club career ==
On 22 December 2023, it was announced that Miura would join J1 League club Kawasaki Frontale on a permanent deal starting from the 2024 season.

== International career ==
Miura made his debut for the senior Japan national team on 1 January 2024 in a friendly against Thailand.

== Career statistics ==
=== Club ===
As of 12 December 2023.

Appearances and goals by club, season and competition
Club	Season	League			Cup		League Cup		Continental		Other		Total	
Club	Season	Division	Apps	Goals	Apps	Goals	Apps	Goals	Apps	Goals	Apps	Goals	Apps	Goals
Ventforet Kofu	2022	J2 League	5	0	0	0	–		–		–		5	0
Ventforet Kofu	2023	J2 League	21	0	2	0	–		3 (Note: Appearance(s) in the AFC Champions League)	0	1 (Note: Appearance(s) in the Japanese Super Cup)	0	27	0
Kawasaki Frontale	2024	J1 League	0	0	0	0	0	0	0	0	0	0	0	0
Career total			26	0	2	0	0	0	3	0	1	0	32	0

=== International ===
As of 1 January 2024

Appearances and goals by national team and year
National team	Year	Apps	Goals
Japan	2024	1	1
Total		1	1

== Honours ==
Kawasaki Frontale

- Japanese Super Cup: 2024
