= Yuki Yamamoto (footballer) =

Japanese footballer

Personal information
- Date of birth: 6 November 1997 (age 29)
- Place of birth: Yasu, Shiga, Japan
- Height: 1.73 m (5 ft 8 in)
- Position: Defensive midfielder

Team information
- Current team: Kawasaki Frontale
- Number: 6

Youth career
- Yasu JFC
- Sagawa Shiga
- FC Kotoh
- 2013–2015: Kusatsu Higashi High School

College career
Years	Team	Apps	(Gls)
2016–2019	Kwansei Gakuin University		

Senior career*
Years	Team	Apps	(Gls)
2019–2023	Gamba Osaka	28	(2)
2020	Gamba Osaka U-23	2	(0)
2024–	Kawasaki Frontale	74	(6)
- * Club domestic league appearances and goals as of 1 August 2026

Yuki Yamamoto (山本 悠樹, Yamamoto Yūki; born 6 November 1997) is a Japanese footballer currently playing as a defensive midfielder for Kawasaki Frontale.

== Career statistics ==
=== Club ===
As of 17 March 2021.

Club	Season	League			National Cup		League Cup		Continental		Other		Total	
Club	Season	Division	Apps	Goals	Apps	Goals	Apps	Goals	Apps	Goals	Apps	Goals	Apps	Goals
Kwansei Gakuin University	2016	–			2 (Note: Appearances in the Emperor's Cup)	1	–		–		0	0	2	1
Kwansei Gakuin University	2018	–			3	1	–		–		0	0	3	1
Kwansei Gakuin University	2019	–			1	0	–		–		0	0	1	0
Kwansei Gakuin University	Total		0	0	6	2	0	0	0	0	0	0	6	2
Gamba Osaka	2019	J1 League	0	0	0	0	0	0	0	0	0	0	0	0
Gamba Osaka	2020	J1 League	27	2	2	0	3 (Note: Appearances in the J. League Cup)	0	0	0	0	0	32	2
Gamba Osaka	2021	J1 League	1	0	0	0	0	0	0	0	1 (Note: Appearances in the Japanese Super Cup)	0	2	0
Gamba Osaka	Total		28	2	2	0	3	0	0	0	1	0	34	2
Gamba Osaka U-23	2020	J3 League	2	0	–		–		–		0	0	2	0
Career total			30	2	8	2	3	0	0	0	1	0	42	4

== Honours ==
=== Club ===
Kawasaki Frontale

- Japanese Super Cup: 2024
