= Kawasaki Frontale =

Japanese football club

Kawasaki Frontale 川崎フロンターレ
- Full name: Kawasaki Frontale
- Nicknames: Azzurro Nero (Sky-Blue-Black), Frontale
- Short name: KWF
- Founded: 1955; 71 years ago as Fujitsu SC; 1997; 29 years ago as Kawasaki Frontale
- Ground: Uvance Todoroki Stadium by Fujitsu, Nakahara, Kawasaki, Japan
- Capacity: 26,232
- Owner: Fujitsu
- Chairman: Yoshihiro Warashina
- Manager: Shigetoshi Hasebe
- League: J1 League
- 2026: J1 League, 8th of 20
- Website: frontale.co.jp
Home colours	Away colours

Kawasaki Frontale (川崎フロンターレ, Kawasaki Furontāre) is a Japanese professional football club based in Kawasaki, Kanagawa Prefecture, south of Tokyo. The club currently compete in the J1 League, which is the top tier of football in the country. Their home stadium is Kawasaki Todoroki Stadium in Nakahara Ward, located in the central area of Kawasaki.

Frontale have won 4 J1 League, 2 J2 League, 2 Emperor's Cup, 1 J.League Cup and 3 Japanese Super Cup titles.

In 2024–25 season, for the first time in club's history, Frontale became the first club from East Asia to reach the final of newly revamped AFC Champions League Elite.

== History ==
=== Establishment and earlier years (1955–1977) ===
The club was founded in 1955 as Fujitsu Soccer Club, the company team of Fujitsu. For several decades, the club competed in the regional and lower tiers of Japanese football, gradually establishing itself within the corporate football structure. It was one of many city clubs that comprised the Japan Soccer League (JSL), including Yomiuri (later Tokyo Verdy 1969), Toshiba (later Consadole Sapporo) and NKK SC (now defunct). They first made the JSL Division 1 in 1977, only to be relegated the next season.

=== Professional transition and relegations (1993–2000) ===
With the professionalisation of Japanese football and the establishment of the J.League in 1993, the club began transitioning towards a professional identity. In 1997, Fujitsu Soccer Club was reorganised and rebranded as a professional club with a new name, 'Kawasaki Frontale', adopting its current name and relocating to Kawasaki, which means "frontal" in Italian. The club old crest and colours are based on those of Brazilian side Grêmio, because both clubs have cooperated since 26 March 1997.

Frontale joined the newly formed second division, the J2 League, in 1999. In their debut season, the club won the 1999 J2 League title and secured promotion to the top flight. However, their first stint in the J1 League was short-lived, as they were relegated after one season. Frontale would not return to the top flight until 2000, when they were promoted to the newly rebranded J1 League. But they were once again dropped to the J2 League at the end of the season.

=== Top flight return and AFC Champions League debut (2004–2007) ===
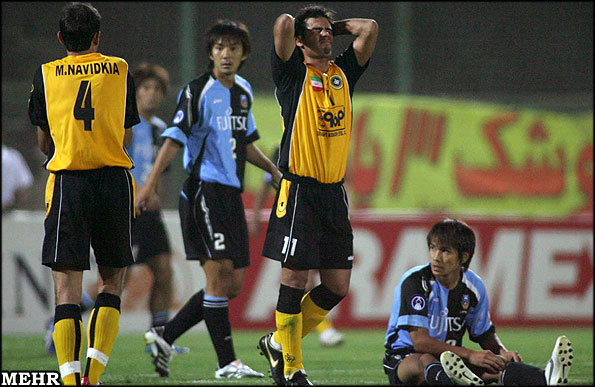
Kawasaki Frontale battling against Sepahan in the 2007 AFC Champions League

In the 2004 season, Frontale crowned champions of J2 League and won promotion to J1 for the second time. With the former rival city clubs out of the way due to relocation or liquidation, they began building their power base in the city of Kawasaki.

In 2006, Frontale achieved runners-up position in J1, their highest league position up to that time. As a result, they entered the AFC Champions League for the first time in the 2007 edition. They were drawn in Group F alongside Korean club Chunnam Dragons, Indonesian club Arema Malang and Thailand club Bangkok University. Frontale went on to have an undefeated campaign in the group stage finishing as group leaders to advanced to the knockout stage. However, Frontale lost 5–4 on penalties shootout to Iranian club Sepahan thus knocking out from the tournament.

During this period, Frontale became known for their attacking philosophy and consistent performances. They also reached the final of the Emperor's Cup in 2007, although they were defeated 0–2 to Kashima Antlers. Despite regular top finishes, the club gained a reputation for falling just short in decisive moments, leading to a prolonged wait for major silverware.

=== Domestic domination under Toru Oniki (2017–2024) ===
Frontale’s fortunes changed dramatically in 2017 under the helms of manager, Toru Oniki. The club went on to win its first-ever J1 League title in the 2017 season, finishing ahead of rivals after years of near misses. After two second-place finishes in 2008 and 2009, Kawasaki finally won the league, coming from behind to upstage bitter rivals Kashima Antlers after they were held to a draw at Júbilo Iwata, 16 seasons and 40 years after their first promotion to the top division.

Kawasaki became the first team to win four J1 titles in a five-year span. They came up short multiple times (2000, 2007, 2009 and 2017) but won their first J.League Cup in 2019, beating Hokkaido Consadole Sapporo on penalties. In 2020, they successfully won their third J1 League title with 83 points, staying 17 points clear off the runners-up, Gamba Osaka. They made sure of the title with four games to spare, which was a record under the 34-match league format. With a player depth not being restricted to the starting XI, Frontale managed to get the best out of the five substitutions allowed by the J. League, per FIFA recommendation, instated after the COVID-19 outbreak. A good example was a breakout season by Kaoru Mitoma, who started more matches on the bench than in the starting XI.

In 2021, Frontale won their first title of the year in the opening match of the season, beating Gamba Osaka 3–2 in the 2021 Japanese Super Cup.

Raised standards, eye-catching performances, and increase of national team level players coming from Frontale led foreign clubs to pay attention to their players. Among the most significant departures, Frontale saw two major talents leaving the club mid-season. Kaoru Mitoma was included in the 2020 J.League Best XI in his first full season as a professional despite playing less than half of his matches as a starter for Frontale, being signed by Brighton & Hove Albion of the Premier League. The second one was midfielder, Ao Tanaka. The 2020 J.League Rookie of the Year which quickly earned his spot on the starting XI after turning professional, transferring to Fortuna Düsseldorf of 2. Bundesliga on loan, which later would have his deal turning permanent. They weren't the only departures leaving a mark on the team, as they followed Hidemasa Morita to Europe, as the latter went on to sign for Santa Clara of the Primeira Liga.

However, despite Frontale having their future performances being apparently threatened after these departures, the club went on to win the 2021 J1 League with a record-breaking season, which saw them: Winning the most points on a single J1 League season ever, with 92 points won on 38 matches; Achieving the fewest number of losses on a J1 League season, registering only two losses in total (the first J1 loss only came six months after the season opening); Being the joint unbeaten team at home matches in a J1 League season, equalling Urawa Red Diamonds's tally in 2006; Being the first ever J1 team to win more than 80 points on consecutive seasons.

Leandro Damião, with 23 goals, was Frontale's individual highlight on the 2021 season, helping him win the MVP award, after being the joint league top-scorer and one of the players with the most assists of the tournament. The latter record was accomplished by another Frontale players, Miki Yamane, which also saw several call-ups for the Japan national football team throughout the 2021 and 2022 season, alongside other Frontale players and formers players, like the team captain Shogo Taniguchi, and midfielder Yasuto Wakizaka. They joined many other players who previously were selected for the national team while playing at Frontale. Of the selected players, some players can be highlighted, like defender Yoshinobu Minowa, who was selected in 2005. After the 2006 FIFA World Cup, midfielder Kengo Nakamura and forward Kazuki Ganaha became new Japan internationals, especially Kengo Nakamura, who being a mainstay at club and country for a long time. Long-serving for the national team, goalkeeper Eiji Kawashima was also selected while at Frontale, making his debut on the 2008 East Asian Cup. Shuhei Terada, who played all of his 13-year professional career at Frontale, was also selected for the national team from 2008 to 2009.

After five consecutive seasons winning at least one major title from 2017 to 2021, Frontale tasted a season without winning any silverware for the entire 2022. Taking their previous overall season into account, the club went through an uninspired season, which saw early eliminations in all four competitions the club played that involved knockout-stage formats. In February, the club already saw their first match of the season resulting on a defeat, after losing 2–0 by Urawa Red Diamonds at the Super Cup. On April, the club was eliminated at the 2022 AFC Champions League at its group stage, finishing their group as runners-up, behind Malaysian champions Johor Darul Ta'zim. In June, at the Emperor's Cup, Frontale were unexpectedly eliminated, at the third round of the competition, after being defeated by J2 League club Tokyo Verdy by 1–0.

On the latter half of the season, Frontale continued an atypically poor run of form. On August, the club started their campaign at the J.League Cup, entering the competition late in the double-legged quarterfinals, after receiving a bye from the early stages of the competition due to their AFC Champions League qualification. The club played this quarterfinal against Cerezo Osaka and was awarded the hosting rights of the tie's second leg. Despite not losing any of the two legs, Frontale didn't won any, either. At Cerezo, the match ended 1–1, giving a theoretical relief for Frontale ahead of the match, who only needed a 0–0 draw or a win to proceed in the competition. Frontale started the second leg winning 2–0, with Marcinho scoring two goals at the 40th and 53rd minute. Surprisingly, Frontale collapsed at the dying minutes of the match, conceding two heading goals at the 90th and 95th minute, respectively.

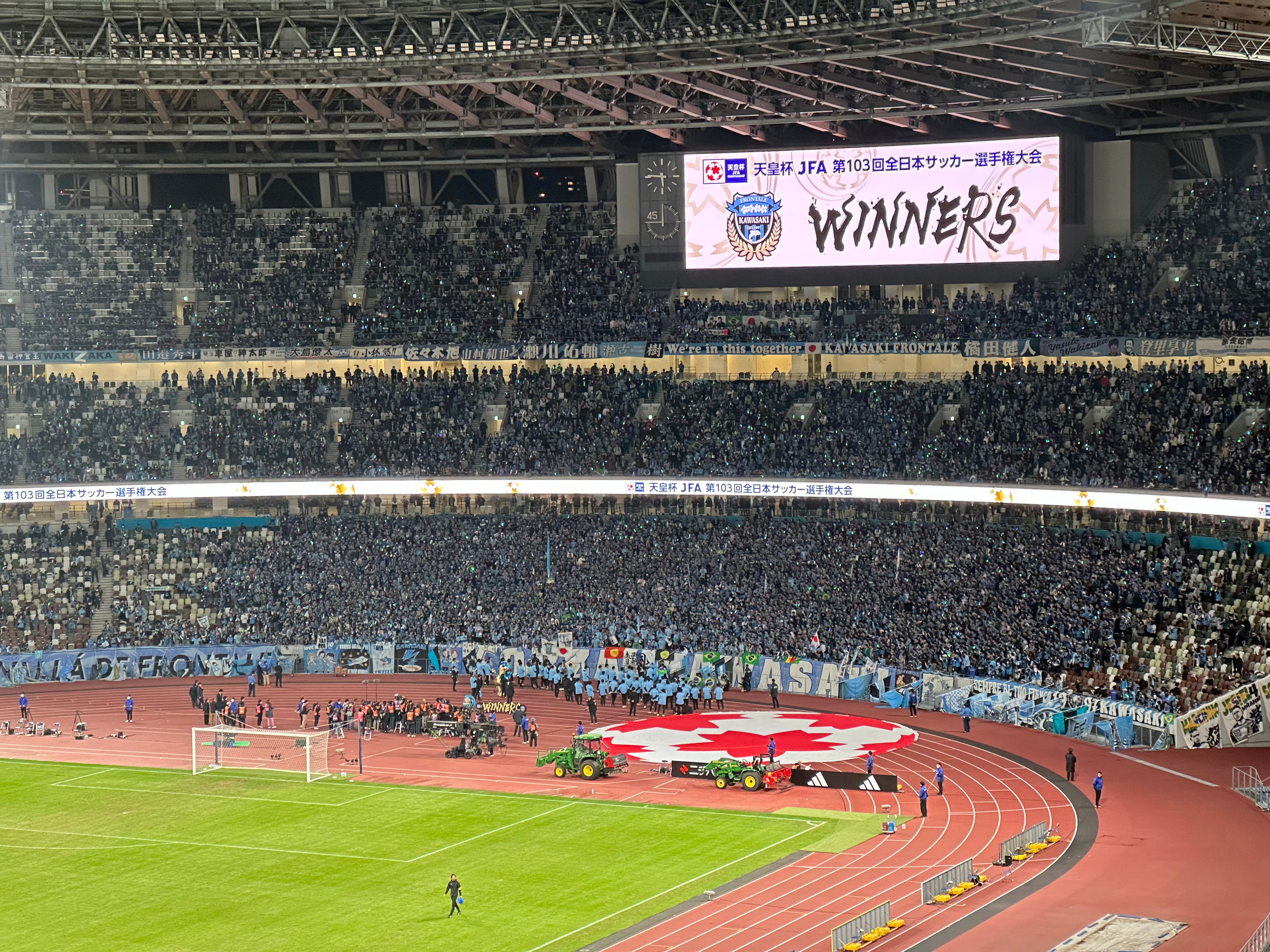
Kawasaki Frontale fans after their match against Kashiwa Reysol in 2023

Following the elimination at the J.League Cup, only the J1 League title was then available for Frontale to chase. Oscillating placements throughout the campaign, the club still managed to finish five separate matchweeks at the top of the league in the first half of the season. In the second half of the season, though, never again did Frontale get past the second place. Serving as a minor consolation for their season, the club held to a hardly fought title chase alongside Sanfrecce Hiroshima (until the closing matchweeks). In December, at the 38th round, the last round of the season, Frontale were narrow two points away from first-placed Yokohama F. Marinos. A 13-goal difference was also in Frontale's way, meaning that in the more realistic scenario, Frontale needed to win their match and expect Marinos to lose theirs. Playing the round against FC Tokyo, Frontale were early threatened with a red card, as Jung Sung-ryong was sent off a few minutes after Frontale's first goal. Despite playing the rest of the match with 10 players, Frontale still managed to win past FC Tokyo by 3–2. Playing against Vissel Kobe, Marinos won the match by 3–1, and then were handed the J1 League title. On the plus side, finishing as the league's runners-up led the club to qualify for the 2023–24 AFC Champions League, entering the competition in the group stage.

On 9 December 2023, Frontale won the 2023 Emperor's Cup title, beating Kashiwa Reysol 8–7 in the penalty shootout after the match ended 0–0. This second national cup victory resulting their qualification for the 2024–25 AFC Champions League Elite, entering directly from the league stage.

On 17 February 2024, Frontale defeated 2023 J1 League champions, Vissel Kobe, in the 2024 Japanese Super Cup at Japan National Stadium to clinch their third title of the competition.

On 16 October 2024, it was announced that Toru Oniki has stepped down as the head coach of the club at the end of 2024 season, following the expiration of his contract.

=== First Asia final with Shigetoshi Hasebe (2025–present) ===
Following the departure of Oniki, along with mid-table finish at 8th position in both 2023 and 2024, it was announced by Frontale that Shigetoshi Hasebe, who left his position at Avispa Fukuoka, would become the new manager for 2025 season. Hasebe began his tenure with a 4-0 victory over the Pohang Steelers in the 2024–25 AFC Champions League Elite group stage, and followed up with a 4–0 win over Nagoya Grampus in the J1 League opener. Kawasaki went on to defeat Chinese club Shanghai Shenghua with an aggregate of 5–1 in the AFC Champions League Elite round of 16 tie, thus advancing to the quarter-finals.

Playing at a centralized venue on Saudi Arabia from this stage on, Kawasaki faced off against Qatari side Al Sadd at the quarter-finals. Club captain Yasuto Wakizaka scored the winner in extra time putting the team to win 3–2, thus advancing to the club first ever semi-finals in the AFC Champions League Elite. They ended up qualifying to their first final as well, as Kawasaki beat Al-Nassr by the same 3–2 score, this time during the usual 90 minutes. At the final, they faced another Saudi Pro League team, Al-Ahli on 3 May 2025. Despite their efforts, Kawasaki finished the 2024–25 AFC Champions League as runners-up, losing by 2–0 to the Saudi side. The 2025 run to the final reinforced Frontale’s status as a major force in Asian football and represented a key milestone following their domestic dominance in the late 2010s and early 2020s.

== Team image ==
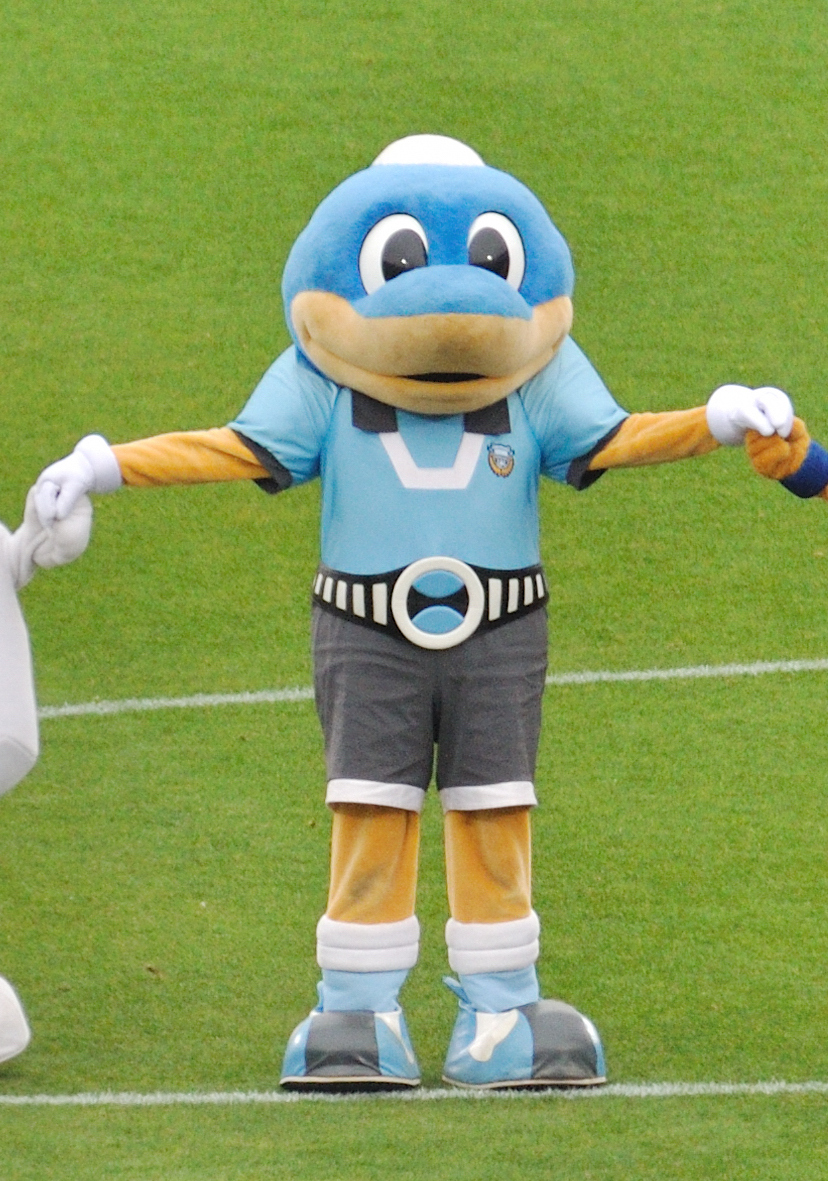
Kawasaki Frontale mascot

=== Rivalries ===
==== Tamagawa Clásico ====
Frontale's rivalry with FC Tokyo is known as the Tamagawa Clásico (using the Spanish word "Clásico" as used in derbies in Spain and Latin America). The two clubs first met in the inaugural Kanto Soccer League in 1967, but did not meet again until 1991 in the old Japan Soccer League (JSL) Division 2 and were rivals for promotion to the J.League in the 1990s. They co-founded the new J2 League in 1999 and were promoted together the same year; although Frontale were immediately relegated, they were promoted again in 2005 and the two clubs have regularly met since.

Frontale also has a Tamagawa rivalry with Tokyo Verdy, which was originally also based in Kawasaki and subsequently moved to Chōfu in 2000. The two clubs were co-founders of the JSL Division 2 in 1972 and, although they spent 20 seasons (1979 to 1999) in separate tiers, their rivalry was rekindled in the late 1990s as Kawasaki fans deserted Tokyo Verdy to support Frontale, who were seen as a more community-focused club. Their fortunes have since been reversed, as Frontale is now a top flight mainstay while Tokyo Verdy sunk into the second tier in 2005, only recently being promoted back to J1 in 2024.

== Stadium ==
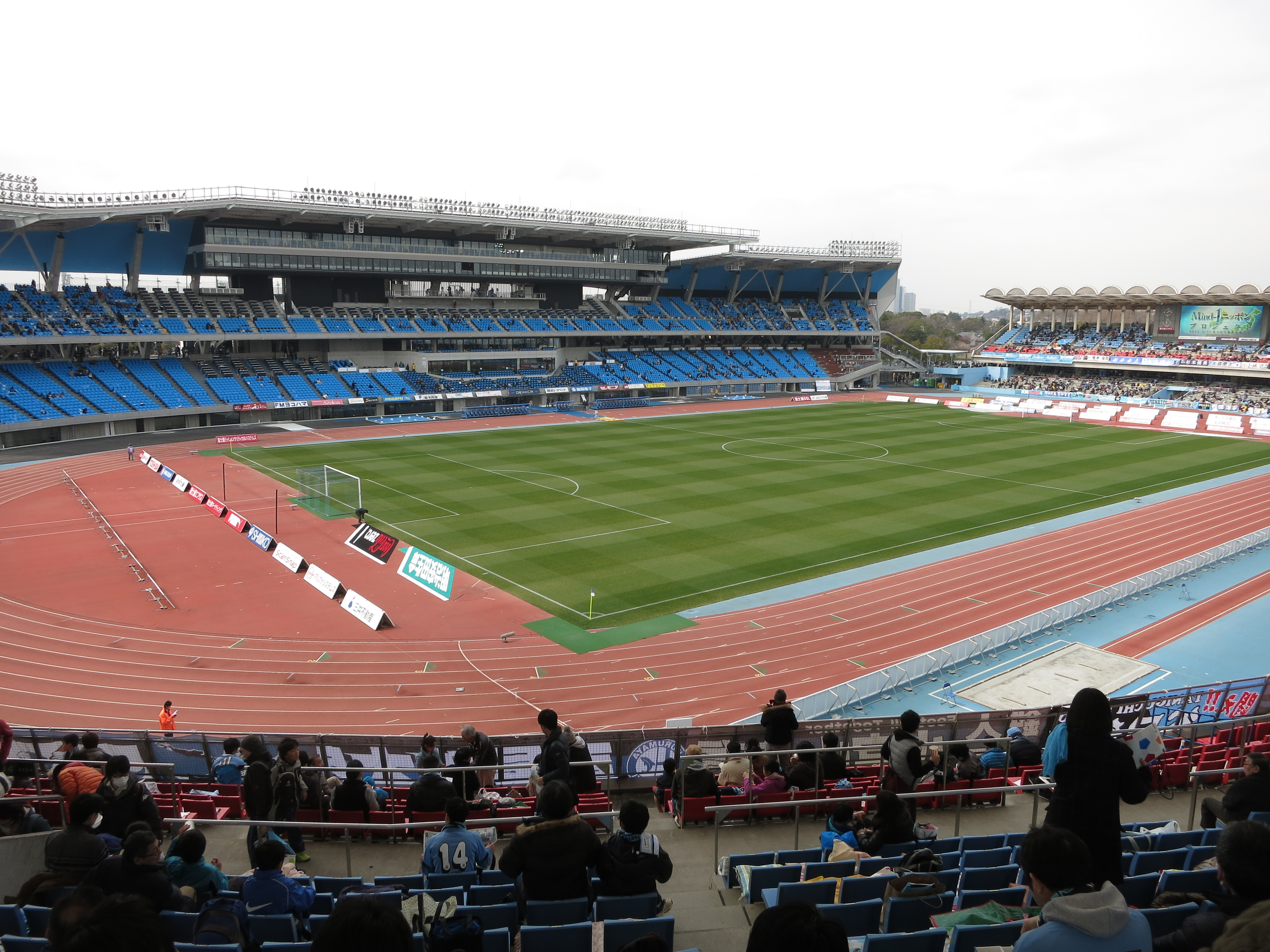
Uvance Todoroki Stadium

Uvance Todoroki Stadium is the home ground of Frontale, located in Nakahara-ku. The stadium has been the club’s primary venue since its early years and serves as a central hub for football in the city. It features a seating capacity of approximately 26,232 and is known for its close-to-pitch stands, creating an intense and vibrant matchday atmosphere.

Originally opened in 1962, the stadium has undergone multiple renovations and expansions to meet modern standards, including upgrades to seating, lighting, and facilities. It was formerly known as Todoroki Athletics Stadium before adopting its current name due to sponsorship agreements. In addition to hosting Kawasaki Frontale matches in the J1 League and the AFC Champions League Elite, the venue is also used for athletics events and other sporting activities.

The stadium is known for its strong home support, with the club’s supporters contributing to a notably active match-day atmosphere.

== Kit suppliers and shirt sponsors ==
=== Sponsors ===
Period	Kit manufacturer	Main sponsors
1992–1998	(Brazil) Penalty	(Japan) Fujitsu
1999–2010	(Japan) Asics	(Japan) Fujitsu
2011–present	(Germany) Puma	(Japan) Fujitsu

=== Kit evolution ===
Home Kit - 1st
1999-2000	2001-2003	2004-2005	2006	2007
2008	2009-2010	2011	2012	2013
2014	2015	2016	2017	2018
2019	2020	2021	2022	2023
2024	2025			

Away Kit - 2nd
1999-2003	2004	2005	2006	2007
2008	2009	2010	2011	2012
2013	2014	2015	2016	2017
2018	2019	2020	2021	2022
2023	2024	2025		

Alternative kits - 3rd
2014; ACL	2014; Kawasaki City 90th Anniversary	2015; New Main Stand Completion	2016 Cup Competition	2016; Space Brothers Collaboration
2017; ACL 1st	2017; ACL 2nd	2017; SUMMER	2018; ACL 1st	2018; ACL 2nd
2018; Limited	2019; ACL 1st	2019; ACL 2nd	2019; Kawasaki City 95th Anniversary	2020; Limited
2021; ACL 1st	2021; ACL 2nd	2021; Limited	2022; ACL 1st	2022; ACL 2nd
2022; Limited	ACL2023/24; 1st	ACL2023/24; 2nd		

== Affiliated clubs ==
- (Brazil) Grêmio (26 March 1997–present)
- (Japan) Fukushima United (1 February 2024–30 June 2028)

== Players ==
=== First-team squad ===
As of 7 August 2026

Note: Flags indicate national team as defined under FIFA eligibility rules; some limited exceptions apply. Players may hold more than one non-FIFA nationality.

No.	Pos.	Nation	Player
1	GK	JPN	Louis Yamaguchi
2	DF	JPN	Yuto Matsunagane
3	DF	JPN	Hiroto Taniguchi
4	DF	BRA	Pedro Romano
5	DF	JPN	Asahi Sasaki (vice-captain)
6	MF	JPN	Yuki Yamamoto
8	MF	JPN	Kento Tachibanada
9	FW	SRB	Lazar Romanić
10	MF	JPN	Ryota Oshima
11	FW	JPN	Yu Kobayashi
13	DF	JPN	Sota Miura
14	MF	JPN	Yasuto Wakizaka (captain)
16	MF	JPN	Yuto Ozeki
17	FW	JPN	Tatsuya Itō (vice-captain)
18	MF	JPN	Kazuya Konno
19	MF	JPN	So Kawahara
20	FW	JPN	Kyosuke Mochiyama
21	GK	JPN	Yuki Hayasaka
22	DF	CRO	Filip Uremović

No.	Pos.	Nation	Player
23	FW	BRA	Marcinho
24	FW	JPN	Ten Miyagi
25	MF	JPN	Shuto Yamaichi
26	MF	JPN	Kota Yui
28	DF	JPN	Yuichi Maruyama
29	DF	JPN	Reon Yamahara
30	DF	JPN	Hiroto Noda
31	DF	JPN	Noriharu Kan
32	DF	JPN	Shunsuke Hayashi
33	GK	KOR	Lee Keun-hyeong
34	MF	JPN	Ryuki Osa
35	DF	JPN	Tetsuya Takahashi ^{DSP}
36	FW	JPN	Rin Honma ^{DSP}
37	MF	JPN	Hiroto Ogawa ^{Type 2}
39	DF	JPN	Asuto Fujita ^{Type 2}
41	MF	JPN	Akihiro Ienaga
49	GK	GER	Svend Brodersen (vice-captain)
93	FW	BRA	Kayke Queiroz (on loan from Botafogo)
97	FW	BRA	Derik Lacerda

=== Out on loan ===
Note: Flags indicate national team as defined under FIFA eligibility rules; some limited exceptions apply. Players may hold more than one non-FIFA nationality.

No.	Pos.	Nation	Player
15	MF	JPN	Toya Myogan (on loan at Tochigi SC)
27	DF	JPN	Ryota Kamihashi (on loan at Giravanz Kitakyushu)
38	FW	JPN	Soma Kanda (on loan at Tokyo Verdy)

No.	Pos.	Nation	Player
—	DF	JPN	Kaito Tsuchiya (on loan at Fukushima United)
—	MF	BRA	Patrick Verhon (on loan at Oita Trinita)

=== Kawasaki Frontale U-18 ===
As of 29 April 2026

Below are list of U-18 team players belong to Kawasaki Frontale academy that competing in 2026 Prince Takamado U-18 Premier League, the top-flight league for U-18 team of football clubs and senior high school football teams in the country. Only registered players for the competition will be displayed.

Note: Flags indicate national team as defined under FIFA eligibility rules; some limited exceptions apply. Players may hold more than one non-FIFA nationality.

No.	Pos.	Nation	Player
1	GK	JPN	Kantaro Iwata
2	DF	JPN	Yohei Yamakawa
3	DF	JPN	Asuto Fujita (vice-captain) *
4	MF	JPN	Louis Imahiro (vice-captain)
5	DF	JPN	Kosuke Nagasaki (vice-captain)
6	MF	JPN	Shuto Oda
7	DF	JPN	Shota Ogawa
8	MF	JPN	Hiroto Ogawa (vice-captain) *
9	FW	JPN	Kyu Kawamura
10	MF	JPN	Katsuyoshi Kinoshita (captain)
11	FW	JPN	Neo Hirose
13	FW	JPN	Eita Mikami
14	MF	JPN	Quan Tianhai
15	DF	JPN	Kyo Kikuchi
16	GK	JPN	Kanta Okamoto
17	MF	JPN	Kazato Kimura
18	DF	JPN	Takuma Sasakura
19	GK	JPN	Ryuto Ueki
20	MF	JPN	Kō Kato
21	GK	JPN	Futo Komura
22	FW	JPN	Seiyo Sogo
23	MF	JPN	Hiruzu Sakai

No.	Pos.	Nation	Player
24	DF	JPN	Yuta Kawanishi
25	FW	JPN	Koga Nishikawa
26	DF	JPN	Haru Tsushima
27	MF	JPN	Hayato Takeuchi
28	DF	JPN	Sho Inomata
29	DF	JPN	Tokito Noda
30	DF	JPN	Ryuto Yoshida
31	DF	JPN	Taichi Watanabe
32	MF	JPN	Takuma Watanabe
33	GK	JPN	Kaoru Aoki
34	MF	JPN	Taiga Nakano
35	MF	JPN	Rei Hamano
36	MF	JPN	Towa Sakanishi
37	MF	JPN	Eito Natsume
38	MF	JPN	Mizuki Arai
39	MF	JPN	Fuya Mochizuki
40	FW	JPN	Ryusei Doi
41	MF	JPN	Kojiro Hatsune
42	FW	JPN	Sho Kawakami
43	FW	JPN	Rintaro Hayashi
44	DF	JPN	Koshiro Ueno
45	MF	JPN	Eito Yoshizawa

Players marked with * (Asterisk) set to become full-time members of the first team beginning January 2027. As of 7 August 2026, they are registered as type 2 players.

== Management and staff ==
Club officials for 2026 season.

Position	Name
Manager	(Japan) Shigetoshi Hasebe
Assistant manager	(Japan) Yasuhiro Nagahashi
Coaches	(Japan) Yuki Yoshida (Japan) Masashi Oguro (Japan) Hideki Sahara (Japan) Kazuno Nakashima
Goalkeeper coach	(Japan) Tomoaki Ishino
Strength and Conditioning Coach	(Japan) Sotaro Higuchi
Assistant S&C coach	(Japan) Keisuke Matsumoto
Analyst	(India) Shlok Asher
Trainer	(Japan) Yoji Hirahara (Japan) Tomohisa Seki (Japan) Katsuhiro Suzuki (Japan) Naoya Kinoshima
Physiotherapist	(Japan) Hiroshi Nishimura (Japan) Ryota Kudo
Interpreter	(Japan) Kazuya Nakayama (Japan) Hiroto Furukawa (South Korea) Kim Myong-ho
Roupeiro	(Japan) Hiroyuki Ito
Side manager	(Japan) Takashi Seto (Japan) Akito Kobayashi
Scouting	(Japan) Tatsuru Mukojima
Doctor	(Japan) Hiroshi Iwaso (Japan) Hidetaka Goto (Japan) Yutaro Ishida (Japan) Ryota Kuzuhara (Japan) Eisaburo Honda (Japan) Kensuke Kimura

== Honours ==
As Fujitsu SC (1955–1996) and Kawasaki Frontale (1997–present):

Type	Honours	Titles	Season
League	J1 League	4	2017, 2018, 2020, 2021
League	J2 League	2	1999, 2004
League	Kanto Soccer League	1	1968
League	Japan Soccer League Division 2	1	1976
Cup	Emperor's Cup	2	2020, 2023
Cup	J.League Cup	1	2019
Cup	Japanese Super Cup	3	2019, 2021, 2024

Bold is for those competition that are currently active.

== Records and statistics ==
As of 1 July 2026.

Top 10 all-time appearances
Rank	Player	Years	Club appearance
1	(Japan) Kengo Nakamura	2003–2020	678
2	(Japan) Yu Kobayashi	2010–present	532
3	(Japan) Hiroki Ito	2001–2013	496
4	(Japan) Shōgo Taniguchi	2014–2022	383
5	(Japan) Akihiro Ienaga	2017–present	380
6	(Japan) Kyōhei Noborizato	2009–2023	379
7	(South Korea) Jung Sung-ryong	2016–2025	363
8	(Brazil) Juninho	2003–2011	355
9	(Japan) Ryota Oshima	2011–present	350
10	(Japan) Shintaro Kurumaya	2014–2025	341

Top 10 all-time goalscorer
Rank	Player	Club appearance	Total goals
1	(Brazil) Juninho	355	214
2	(Japan) Yu Kobayashi	532	184
3	(Japan) Yoshito Ōkubo	186	104
3	(Japan) Kengo Nakamura	678	104
5	(Japan) Kazuki Ganaha	306	92
6	(Brazil) Leandro Damião	178	71
7	(North Korea) Jong Tae-se	161	64
8	(Japan) Akihiro Ienaga	380	61
8	(Japan) Yasuto Wakizaka	314	61
10	(Brazil) Renatinho	136	49

- Biggest wins: 9–1 vs Kamatamare Sanuki (29 November 1998)
- Heaviest defeats: 0–7 vs Shonan Bellmare (17 August 1993)
- Youngest ever debutant: Kōta Takai ~ 17 years 7 months 14 days old (On 18 April 2022 vs (China) Guangzhou)
- Oldest ever player: (South Korea) Jung Sung-ryong ~ 40 years 10 months 26 days old (On 30 November 2025 vs Sanfrecce Hiroshima)
- Youngest goal scorers: (Brazil) Luiz Renato ~ 18 years 9 months 1 days old (On 11 October 2000 vs Kyoto Sanga)
- Oldest goal scorers: Kengo Nakamura ~ 40 years 0 days old (On 31 October 2020 vs FC Tokyo)

== Award winners ==
As of the end of the 2025 season.

- J.League Player of the Year:

- (Japan) Kengo Nakamura (2016)
- (Japan) Yu Kobayashi (2017)
- (Japan) Akihiro Ienaga (2018)
- (Brazil) Leandro Damião (2021)

- J.League Top Scorer:

- (Brazil) Juninho (2008)
- (Japan) Yoshito Ōkubo (2013, 2014, 2015)
- (Japan) Yu Kobayashi (2017)
- (Brazil) Leandro Damião (2021)

- J.League Best XI:

- (Japan) Kengo Nakamura (2006, 2007, 2008, 2009, 2010, 2016, 2017, 2018)
- (Japan) Hiroyuki Taniguchi (2006)
- (Brazil) Juninho (2007)
- (Japan) Eiji Kawashima (2009)
- (Japan) Yoshito Ōkubo (2013, 2014, 2015)
- (Japan) Yu Kobayashi (2016, 2017)
- (Japan) Shintaro Kurumaya (2017, 2018)
- (Brazil) Elsinho (2017, 2018)
- (Japan) Shogo Taniguchi (2018, 2020, 2021, 2022)
- (Japan) Akihiro Ienaga (2018, 2020, 2021, 2022)
- (South Korea) Jung Sung-ryong (2018, 2020)
- (Japan) Ryota Oshima (2018)
- (Japan) Miki Yamane (2020, 2021, 2022)
- (Brazil) Jesiel (2020, 2021)
- (Japan) Hidemasa Morita (2020)
- (Japan) Kaoru Mitoma (2020)
- (Japan) Kyohei Noborizato (2020)
- (Japan) Ao Tanaka (2020)
- (Brazil) Leandro Damião (2021)
- (Japan) Reo Hatate (2021)
- (Japan) Yasuto Wakizaka (2021, 2022, 2023)
- (Brazil) Marcinho (2022)
- (Japan) Tatsuya Itō (2025)

- J.League Best Young Player:

- (Japan) Ao Tanaka (2019)
- (Japan) Kōta Takai (2024)

- J.League Goal of the Year:

- (Japan) Ryota Oshima against Vissel Kobe (20 October 2018)

- Individual Fair Play Award:
  - (Japan) Eiji Kawashima (2009)
  - (Japan) Shogo Taniguchi (2015)
  - (Japan) Miki Yamane (2021)
- J2 League Top Scorer:
  - (Brazil) Juninho (2004)

=== FIFA World Cup players ===
The following players have been selected by their country in the FIFA World Cup, while playing for Kawasaki Frontale:

- (Japan) Kengo Nakamura (2010)
- (Japan) Junichi Inamoto (2010)
- (Japan) Eiji Kawashima (2010)
- (North Korea) Jong Tae-Se (2010)
- (Japan) Yoshito Ōkubo (2014)
- (Japan) Ryota Oshima (2018)
- (Japan) Shogo Taniguchi (2022)
- (Japan) Miki Yamane (2022)

=== Olympic players ===
The following players have represented their country at the Summer Olympic Games whilst playing for Kawasaki Frontale:

- (Japan) Hiroyuki Taniguchi (2008)
- (Japan) Shunsuke Ando (2012)
- (Japan) Riki Harakawa (2016)
- (Japan) Ryota Oshima (2016)
- (Japan) Ao Tanaka (2020)
- (Japan) Kaoru Mitoma (2020)
- (Japan) Reo Hatate (2020)
- (Japan) Kota Takai (2024)

== Managerial history ==
Manager	Period	Honours
(Japan) Shigeo Yaegashi	1977–1981, 1985–1989	
(Japan) Kazuo Saito	1997	
(Brazil) Everaldo Pierrotti	1997 (till the end of the 1997 season)	
(Brazil) Beto	1998–15 April 1999	
(Japan) Ikuo Matsumoto	16 April 1999–January 2000	– 1999 J2 League
(Brazil) Zeca	January 2000–4 May 2000	
(Japan) Toshiaki Imai	5 May 2000–14 September 2000	
(Japan) Hiroshi Kobayashi	15 September 2000–January 2001	
(Japan) Yoshiharu Horii	January 2001–16 July 2001	
(Japan) Nobuhiro Ishizaki	17 July 2001–December 2003	
(Japan) Takashi Sekizuka	January 2004–April 2008 (resigned halfway due to illness)	– 2004 J2 League
(Japan) Tsutomu Takahata	May 2008–December 2008	
(Japan) Takashi Sekizuka (2)	January 2009–December 2009	
(Japan) Tsutomu Takahata (2)	January 2010–December 2010	
(Japan) Naoki Soma	January 2011–11 April 2012	
(Japan) Tatsuya Mochizuki (interim)	12 April 2012–22 April 2012	
(Japan) Yahiro Kazama	23 April 2012–31 January 2017	
(Japan) Toru Oniki	1 February 2017–11 December 2024	– 2017 J1 League – 2018 J1 League – 2019 J.League Cup – 2019 Japanese Super Cup – 2020 J1 League – 2020 Emperor's Cup – 2021 J1 League – 2021 Japanese Super Cup – 2023 Emperor's Cup – 2024 Japanese Super Cup
(Japan) Shigetoshi Hasebe	12 December 2024–present	

== Season by season record ==
Champions	Runners-up	Third place	Promoted	Relegated

Season	Div.	Teams	Pos.	Avg. Attd.	J.League Cup	Emperor's Cup	Super Cup	AFC CL
1997	JFL	16	3rd		Did not enter	3rd round	–	–
1998	JFL	16	2nd		Group stage	3rd round	–	–
1999	J2	10	1st	5,396	1st round	4th round	–	–
2000	J1	16	16th	7,439	Runners-up	3rd round	–	–
2001	J2	12	7th	3,784	Quarter finals	Semi-finals	–	–
2002	J2	12	4th	5,247	Did not qualify	Quarter finals	–	–
2003	J2	12	3rd	7,258	Did not qualify	4th round	–	–
2004	J2	12	1st	9,148	Did not qualify	5th round	–	–
2005	J1	18	8th	13,658	Group stage	Quarter finals	–	–
2006	J1	18	2nd	14,340	Semi-finals	5th round	–	–
2007	J1	18	5th	17,338	Runners-up	Semi-finals	–	Quarter finals
2008	J1	18	2nd	17,565	Group stage	5th round	–	–
2009	J1	18	2nd	18,847	Runners-up	Quarter finals	–	Quarter finals
2010	J1	18	5th	18,562	Semi-finals	4th round	–	Group stage
2011	J1	18	11th	17,340	2nd round	4th round	–	–
2012	J1	18	8th	17,807	Group stage	4th round	–	–
2013	J1	18	3rd	16,644	Semi-finals	Quarter finals	–	–
2014	J1	18	6th	16,661	Semi-finals	3rd round	–	Round of 16
2015	J1	18	5th	20,999	Group stage	4th round	–	–
2016	J1	18	3rd	22,136	Group stage	Runners-up	–	–
2017	J1	18	1st	22,112	Runners-up	Quarter finals	–	Quarter finals
2018	J1	18	1st	23,218	Quarter finals	Quarter finals	Runners-up	Group stage
2019	J1	18	4th	23,272	Winners	4th round	Winners	Group stage
2020	J1	18	1st	7,862	Semi-final	Winners	–	–
2021	J1	20	1st	7,342	Quarter finals	Semi-finals	Winners	Round of 16
2022	J1	18	2nd	17,939	Quarter finals	3rd round	Runners-up	Group stage
2023	J1	18	8th	19,840	Group Stage	Winners	–	Round of 16
2024	J1	20	8th	21,067	Semi-final	3rd round	Winners	Runners-up
2025	J1	20	8th	22,050	Semi-final	3rd round	–	–
2026-27	J1	20	TBD		TBD	TBD	–	–

== League history ==
- Regional (Kanto Soccer League): 1967–71 (as Fujitsu)
- Division 2 (JSL Div. 2): 1972–76 (as Fujitsu)
- Division 1 (JSL Div. 1): 1977–78
- Division 2 (JSL Div. 2): 1979–91
- Division 2 (former JFL Div. 1): 1992–98 (as Fujitsu 1992–95; Fujitsu Kawasaki 1996; Kawasaki Frontale 1997–present)
- Division 2 (J2): 1999
- Division 1 (J1): 2000
- Division 2 (J2): 2001–04
- Division 1 (J1): 2005–present

Total (as of 2025): 24 seasons in the top tier, 30 seasons in the second tier and 5 seasons in the Regional Leagues.
