= 2023 Kawasaki Frontale season =

Kawasaki Frontale
2023 season
- Manager: Toru Oniki
- Stadium: Kawasaki Todoroki Stadium; Kawasaki, Kanagawa
- J1 League: 8th
- Emperor's Cup: Winners
- J.League Cup: Group stage
- AFC Champions League: Round of 16
- Top goalscorer: League: Yasuto Wakizaka (9 goals); All: Yasuto Wakizaka (13 goals)
- Highest home attendance: 22,563 vs Kashima Antlers (25 February; J1 League)
- Lowest home attendance: 5,325 vs Tochigi City (7 June; Emperor's Cup)
- Average home league attendance: 19,791
- Biggest win: 6–0 vs Shimizu S-Pulse (19 April; J.League Cup)
- Biggest defeat: 0–2 vs Gamba Osaka (9 April; J1 League); 0–2 vs Nagoya Grampus (1 July; J1 League)
Home colours	Away colours

The 2023 season was Kawasaki Frontale's 19th consecutive season in the J1 League. It was a reasonably successful season. While Frontale didn’t progress past the group stages in the J.League Cup, and finished in the middle of the pack in 8th place in the J1 league, they won the 2023 Emperor’s cup competition, and won their group stage in the AFC Champions League, before being knocked out by Shandong Taishan on aggregate goals in the round of 16 - a respectable result although a letdown after coming in second in the 2022 tournament.

== Players ==
Note: Flags indicate national team as defined under FIFA eligibility rules; some limited exceptions apply. Players may hold more than one non-FIFA nationality.

No.	Pos.	Nation	Player
1	GK	KOR	Jung Sung-ryong
2	DF	JPN	Kyohei Noborizato (vice-captain)
3	DF	JPN	Takuma Ominami
4	DF	BRA	Jesiel (vice-captain)
5	DF	JPN	Asahi Sasaki
6	MF	BRA	João Schmidt
7	DF	JPN	Shintaro Kurumaya
8	MF	JPN	Kento Tachibanada (captain)
9	FW	BRA	Leandro Damião
10	MF	JPN	Ryota Oshima
11	FW	JPN	Yu Kobayashi
13	DF	JPN	Miki Yamane
14	MF	JPN	Yasuto Wakizaka (vice-captain)
15	DF	JPN	Shuto Tanabe
16	MF	JPN	Tatsuki Seko
17	FW	JPN	Daiya Tono
18	FW	FRA	Bafétimbi Gomis
20	FW	JPN	Shin Yamada

No.	Pos.	Nation	Player
21	GK	JPN	Shunsuke Andō
22	GK	JPN	Yuki Hayasaka
23	FW	BRA	Marcinho
24	MF	JPN	Toya Myogan
27	DF	JPN	Yuto Matsunagane
28	MF	JPN	Yuto Ozeki
29	DF	JPN	Kota Takai
30	MF	JPN	Yusuke Segawa
31	DF	JPN	Kazuya Yamamura
32	MF	JPN	Hinata Yamauchi ^{DSP}
33	FW	JPN	Taisei Miyashiro
34	MF	JPN	Kota Yui ^{Type 2}
36	FW	JPN	Torataro Okazaki ^{Type 2}
37	MF	JPN	Jo Ogawa ^{Type 2}
38	DF	JPN	Eiji Ehara ^{Type 2}
39	DF	JPN	Kaito Tsuchiya ^{Type 2}
41	MF	JPN	Akihiro Ienaga
99	GK	JPN	Naoto Kamifukumoto

=== Out on loan ===
Note: Flags indicate national team as defined under FIFA eligibility rules; some limited exceptions apply. Players may hold more than one non-FIFA nationality.

No.	Pos.	Nation	Player
25	MF	JPN	Renji Matsui (On loan at Machida Zelvia)
26	MF	JPN	Takatora Einaga (On loan at Mito HollyHock)
—	DF	JPN	Kaito Kamiya (On loan at Ventforet Kofu)

No.	Pos.	Nation	Player
—	MF	JPN	Koki Harada (On loan at Nagano Parceiro)
—	FW	JPN	Taiyo Igarashi (On loan at Renofa Yamaguchi)
—	FW	JPN	Ten Miyagi (On loan at Montedio Yamagata)

== Transfers ==
=== Arrivals ===
Date of announcement	Position	Player	From	Type	Source
24 May 2022	FW	(Japan) Shin Yamada	(Japan) Toin University of Yokohama	Full	
28 June 2022	DF	(Japan) Yuto Matsunagane	(Japan) Kawasaki Frontale U-18	Full	
28 June 2022	MF	(Japan) Yuto Ozeki	(Japan) Kawasaki Frontale U-18	Full	
7 September 2022	MF	(Japan) Toya Myogan	(Japan) Riseisha High School	Full	
29 November 2022	MF	(Japan) Yusuke Segawa	(Japan) Shonan Bellmare	Full	
7 December 2022	GK	(Japan) Naoto Kamifukumoto	(Japan) Kyoto Sanga	Full	
9 December 2022	DF	(Japan) Takuma Ominami	(Japan) Kashiwa Reysol	Full	
20 December 2022	FW	(Japan) Taisei Miyashiro	(Japan) Sagan Tosu	Return from loan	
3 March 2023	MF	(Japan) Hinata Yamauchi	(Japan) Toin University of Yokohama	DSP	
13 March 2023	DF	(Japan) Shuto Tanabe	(Japan) JEF United Chiba	Return from loan	
8 August 2023	FW	(France) Bafétimbi Gomis	(Turkey) Galatasaray	Full	

=== Departures ===
Date of announcement	Position	Player	To	Type	Source
26 November 2022	FW	(Japan) Kei Chinen	(Japan) Kashima Antlers	Full	
7 December 2022	DF	(Japan) Zain Issaka	(Japan) Montedio Yamagata	Full	
13 December 2022	FW	(Japan) Taiyo Igarashi	(Japan) Renofa Yamaguchi	Loan	
13 December 2022	DF	(Japan) Kaito Kamiya	(Japan) Ventforet Kofu	Loan	
16 December 2022	FW	(Japan) Ten Miyagi	(Japan) V-Varen Nagasaki	Loan	
29 December 2022	DF	(Japan) Shogo Taniguchi	(Qatar) Al-Rayyan SC	Full	
30 December 2022	GK	(Japan) Kenta Tanno	(Japan) Iwate Grulla Morioka	Full	
23 May 2023	MF	(Japan) Renji Matsui	(Japan) FC Machida Zelvia	Loan	
14 June 2023	FW	(Japan) Takatora Einaga	(Japan) Mito HollyHock	Loan	
21 June 2023	MF	(Thailand) Chanathip Songkrasin	(Thailand) BG Pathum United	Full	
6 July 2023	MF	(Japan) Kazuki Kozuka	(Japan) Suwon Samsung Bluewings	Full	
24 July 2023	FW	(Japan) Ten Miyagi	(Japan) Montedio Yamagata	Loan	

== Friendlies ==
29 June Friendly	Kawasaki Frontale	v	(Germany) Bayern Munich	Tokyo
--:-- JST				Stadium: Japan National Stadium

== Competitions ==
=== Overall record ===
Competition	First match	Last match	Starting round	Final position	Record							
Competition	First match	Last match	Starting round	Final position	Pld	W	D	L	GF	GA	GD	Win %
J1 League	17 February	--	Matchday 1	TBD	21	9	5	7	27	23	+4	42.86
Emperor's Cup	7 June	--	Second round	TBD	2	2	0	0	5	2	+3	100.00
J.League Cup	8 March	18 June	Group stage	Group stage	6	2	2	2	12	7	+5	33.33
AFC CL	--	--	Group stage	TBD	0	0	0	0	0	0	+0	—
Total					29	13	7	9	44	32	+12	44.83

Source: Soccerway

=== J1 League ===
==== League table ====
Pos	Team	Pld	W	D	L	GF	GA	GD	Pts	Qualification or relegation
6	Nagoya Grampus	34	14	10	10	41	36	+5	52	
7	Avispa Fukuoka	34	15	6	13	37	43	−6	51	
8	Kawasaki Frontale	34	14	8	12	51	45	+6	50	Qualification for the AFC Champions League Elite league stage (Note: Qualified as the 2023 Emperor's Cup winners.)
9	Cerezo Osaka	34	15	4	15	39	34	+5	49	
10	Albirex Niigata	34	11	12	11	36	40	−4	45	

Source: JLeague.jp, J.League Data Site
Rules for classification: 1) Points; 2) Goal difference; 3) Goals scored; 4) Head-to-head points; 5) Head-to-head goal difference; 6) Head-to-head goals scored; 7) Fewer disciplinary points.

==== Results summary ====
Overall								Home						Away					
Pld	W	D	L	GF	GA	GD	Pts	W	D	L	GF	GA	GD	W	D	L	GF	GA	GD
21	9	5	7	27	23	+4	32	4	3	2	11	6	+5	5	2	5	16	17	−1

Last updated: 24 July.
Source: Soccerway

==== Matches ====
The full league fixtures were released on 20 January 2023.

17 February 1	Kawasaki Frontale	1–2	Yokohama F. Marinos	Kawasaki
19:00 JST	Jesiel (red card) 87'; Tachibanada 90+1'; João Schmidt (yellow card) 90+5'	Report	Nishimura 4'; Élber 38'; Mizunuma (yellow card) 41'	Stadium: Kawasaki Todoroki Stadium; Attendance: 22,563; Referee: Yudai Yamamoto

25 February 2	Kashima Antlers	1–2	Kawasaki Frontale	Kashima
16:00 JST	Chinen 5'; Araki (red card) 90+5'	Report	Marcinho (yellow card) 38'; Yamamura (red card) 83'; Yamada 89'; Ienaga 90+11' (pen.)	Stadium: Kashima Soccer Stadium; Attendance: 28,608; Referee: Yuichi Nishimura

4 March 3	Kawasaki Frontale	1–1	Shonan Bellmare	Kawasaki
13:00 JST	Oshima (yellow card) 67'; Segawa 81' (yellow card) 85'	Report	Tachi (yellow card) 49'; Onose (yellow card) 60'; Hiraoka 64'	Stadium: Kawasaki Todoroki Stadium; Attendance: 21,171; Referee: Yusuke Araki

11 March 4	Albirex Niigata	1–0	Kawasaki Frontale	Fukuoka
14:00 JST	Ito 22'; Mito (yellow card) 35'	Report	Tachibanada (yellow card) 38'; João Schmidt (yellow card) 70'	Stadium: Denka Big Swan Stadium; Attendance: 26,397; Referee: Jumpei Iida

18 March 5	Kawasaki Frontale	0–0	Cerezo Osaka	Kawasaki
16:00 JST		Report	Capixaba (yellow card) 89'	Stadium: Kawasaki Todoroki Stadium; Attendance: 19,054; Referee: Takuto Okabe

1 April 6	Hokkaido Consadole Sapporo	3–4	Kawasaki Frontale	Sapporo
19:00 JST	Okamura 7'; Asano 22'; Kim Gun-hee 59'	Report	Miyashiro 25'; Yamane 39' (yellow card) 68'; Ienaga 45+1'; Yamada (yellow card) 58'; Kurumaya (yellow card) 81'; Segawa 86'	Stadium: Sapporo Dome; Attendance: 14,654; Referee: Yudai Yamamoto

9 April 7	Gamba Osaka	2–0	Kawasaki Frontale	Suita
15:00 JST	Lavi (yellow card) 15'; Dawhan 29'; Jebali (yellow card) 47'; Alano 50'	Report	Kurumaya (yellow card) 52' (yellow-red card) 60'	Stadium: Panasonic Stadium Suita; Attendance: 20,734; Referee: Jumpei Iida

15 April 8	Kawasaki Frontale	1–2	Nagoya Grampus	Kawasaki
15:00 JST	Miyashiro 56'	Report	Junker 9'; Mateus 45+2'	Stadium: Kawasaki Todoroki Stadium; Attendance: 17,304; Referee: Koichiro Fukushima

23 April 9	Kawasaki Frontale	1–1	Urawa Red Diamonds	Kawasaki
16:00 JST	Wakizaka 48'	Report	Linssen 81'	Stadium: Kawasaki Todoroki Stadium; Attendance: 22,304; Referee: Ryo Tanimoto

29 April 10	Avispa Fukuoka	1–3	Kawasaki Frontale	Fukuoka
17:00 JST	Tanabe (yellow card) 26'; Tsuruno 85'; Douglas Grolli (yellow card) 90+5'	Report	Noborizato 12'; Miyashiro 47'; Seko (yellow card) 63'; Nara 65' (o.g.)	Stadium: Best Denki Stadium; Attendance: 9,053; Referee: Yudai Yamamoto

3 May 11	Kyoto Sanga	0–1	Kawasaki Frontale	Kyoto
14:00 JST		Report	Takai (yellow card) 12'; João Schmidt (yellow card) 27'; Yamane (yellow card) 53'; Kobayashi 90+4' (yellow card) 90+4'	Stadium: Sanga Stadium by Kyocera; Attendance: 15,504; Referee: Yoshiro Imamura

7 May 12	Kawasaki Frontale	1–0	Sagan Tosu	Kawasaki
15:00 JST	Wakizaka 52'; Ominami (yellow card) 74'	Report	Tashiro (yellow card) 90+4'	Stadium: Kawasaki Todoroki Stadium; Attendance: 17,674; Referee: Shu Kawamata

12 May 13	FC Tokyo	2–1	Kawasaki Frontale	Tokyo
19:30 JST	Tokumoto 12'; Abe 25'; Nakagawa (yellow card) 32'; Watanabe (yellow card) 34'	Report	Miyashiro 39'; João Schmidt (yellow card) 45+3'; Wakizaka (red card) 52'; Kurumaya (yellow card) 90+1'; Ominami (yellow card) 90+5'	Stadium: Ajinomoto Stadium; Attendance: 56,705; Referee: Yuichi Nishimura

20 May 14	Yokohama FC	2–1	Kawasaki Frontale	Yokohama
16:00 JST	Inoue 44'; Yamashita 48'; Yoshino (yellow card) 67'	Report	Seko 68'	Stadium: Nippatsu Mitsuzawa Stadium; Attendance: 10,276; Referee: Akihiko Ikeuchi

28 May 15	Kawasaki Frontale	2–0	Kashiwa Reysol	Kawasaki
17:00 JST	Kobayashi 21' (yellow card) 76'; Noborizato 45+1'; João Schmidt (yellow card) 90'	Report	Muto (yellow card) 57'	Stadium: Kawasaki Todoroki Stadium; Attendance: 20,207; Referee: Futoshi Nakamura

22 July 16	Vissel Kobe	1–1	Kawasaki Frontale	Kobe
19:03 JST	Osako 59' (pen.), 62'	Report	Wakizaka 23'; Miyashiro 30'	Stadium: Noevir Stadium Kobe; Attendance: 15,986; Referee: Hiroyuki Kimura
Note: Originally meant to be played on 3 June, the fixture had to be postponed to the effect of Typhoon No.2 in public transportation within the Kansai region, which was partially suspended. Both clubs would be unable to travel on both on the day before and on the day when the match was scheduled to happen.

11 June 17	Kawasaki Frontale	1–0	Sanfrecce Hiroshima	Kawasaki
19:00 JST	Ominami (yellow card) 18'; Wakizaka 56'	Report	Douglas Vieira (yellow card) 90+4'	Stadium: Kawasaki Todoroki Stadium; Attendance: 18,051; Referee: Ryo Tanimoto

24 June 18	Urawa Red Diamonds	1–1	Kawasaki Frontale	Saitama
19:30 JST	Iwao (yellow card) 52'; Sekine 53'	Report	Nishikawa 58' (o.g.); Kozuka (red card) 78'; Ienaga 81'	Stadium: Saitama Stadium 2002; Attendance: 35,887; Referee: Yoshiro Imamura

1 July 19	Nagoya Grampus	2–0	Kawasaki Frontale	Toyota
18:00 JST	Junker 41'; Izumi 64'	Report		Stadium: Toyota Stadium; Attendance: 25,560; Referee: Hiroyuki Kimura

8 July 20	Kawasaki Frontale	3–0	Yokohama FC	Kawasaki
19:03 JST	Yamada 13'; Miyashiro 36' (pen.) (yellow card) 55'; Wakizaka (yellow card) 61'; Kurumaya (yellow card) 69'; Segawa (yellow card) 71' (goal) 89'	Report	Ryan (yellow card) 28'	Stadium: Kawasaki Todoroki Stadium; Attendance: 21,856; Referee: Hajime Matsuo

15 July 21	Yokohama F. Marinos	0–1	Kawasaki Frontale	Yokohama
19:04 JST	Ichimori (yellow card) 72'	Report	Schmidt (yellow card) 29'; Kurumaya 90+4'	Stadium: Nissan Stadium; Attendance: 42,772; Referee: Khamis Mohammed Al-marri

6 August 22	Kawasaki Frontale	v	Gamba Osaka	Kawasaki
19:00 JST				Stadium: Kawasaki Todoroki Stadium

12 August 23	Kawasaki Frontale	v	Vissel Kobe	Kawasaki
19:00 JST				Stadium: Kawasaki Todoroki Stadium

19 August 24	Sanfrecce Hiroshima	v	Kawasaki Frontale	Hiroshima
19:00 JST				Stadium: Edion Stadium Hiroshima

26 August 25	Kawasaki Frontale	v	Hokkaido Consadole Sapporo	Kawasaki
19:00 JST				Stadium: Kawasaki Todoroki Stadium

1 September 26	Cerezo Osaka	v	Kawasaki Frontale	Osaka
--:-- JST				Stadium: Yodoko Sakura Stadium

15 September 27	Kawasaki Frontale	v	FC Tokyo	Kawasaki
--:-- JST				Stadium: Kawasaki Todoroki Stadium

22 September 28	Shonan Bellmare	v	Kawasaki Frontale	Hiratsuka
--:-- JST				Stadium: Lemon Gas Stadium Hiratsuka

29 September 29	Kawasaki Frontale	v	Albirex Niigata	Kawasaki
--:-- JST				Stadium: Kawasaki Todoroki Stadium

20 October 30	Kawasaki Frontale	v	Avispa Fukuoka	Kawasaki
--:-- JST				Stadium: Kawasaki Todoroki Stadium

27 October 31	Kashiwa Reysol	v	Kawasaki Frontale	Kashiwa
--:-- JST				Stadium: Sankyo Frontier Kashiwa Stadium

10 November 32	Kawasaki Frontale	v	Kyoto Sanga	Kawasaki
--:-- JST				Stadium: Kawasaki Todoroki Stadium

24 November 33	Kawasaki Frontale	v	Kashima Antlers	Kawasaki
--:-- JST				Stadium: Kawasaki Todoroki Stadium

2 December 34	Sagan Tosu	v	Kawasaki Frontale	Tosu
--:-- JST				Stadium: Ekimae Real Estate Stadium

=== Emperor's Cup ===
As Kawasaki is a J1 club, it starts the competition on the second round.

7 June Second round	Kawasaki Frontale	3–1	Tochigi City	Kawasaki
19:00	Tono 18', 71'; Miyashiro 89'	Report	Caletti (yellow card) 25'; Toshima 65'; Okaniwa (yellow card) 67'	Stadium: Kawasaki Todoroki Stadium; Attendance: 5,325; Referee: Yuichi Nishimura

12 July Third round	Kawasaki Frontale	2–1	Mito HollyHock	Mito
19:03 JST	Seko 25'; Miyashiro 80'	Report	Teranuma 81'	Stadium: K's denki Stadium Mito; Attendance: 2,498; Referee: Takafumi Mikuriya

=== J.League Cup ===
The club will start the competition at the group stage.

Pos	Team	Pld	W	D	L	GF	GA	GD	Pts	Qualification
1	Urawa Red Diamonds	6	1	5	0	5	4	+1	8 (Note: Head-to-head points: Urawa Red Diamonds 6, Shimizu S-Pulse 5, Kawasaki Frontale 4.)	Advance to knockout stage
2	Shimizu S-Pulse	6	2	2	2	8	15	−7	8	
3	Kawasaki Frontale	6	2	2	2	12	7	+5	8	
4	Shonan Bellmare	6	1	3	2	8	7	+1	6	

Source: JLeague.co (EN), JLeague.jp (JA)
Rules for classification: Tiebreakers
Notes:

8 March	Shimizu S-Pulse	3–2	Kawasaki Frontale	Shizuoka
19:03	Oh Se-hun 6'; Shirasaki 7'; Nakayama 70'	Report	Seko (yellow card) 65'; Chanathip 67'; Miyashiro 82' (pen.)	Stadium: IAI Stadium Nihondaira; Attendance: 6,900; Referee: Shu Kawamata

26 March	Kawasaki Frontale	0–0	Shonan Bellmare	Kawasaki
15:00		Report	Nakano (yellow card) 55'; Tachi (yellow card) 82'	Stadium: Kawasaki Todoroki Stadium; Attendance: 14,967; Referee: Tom Bramall (England)

5 April	Kawasaki Frontale	0–0	Urawa Red Diamonds	Kawasaki
19:00		Report	Schalk (yellow card) 72'	Stadium: Kawasaki Todoroki Stadium; Attendance: 18,332; Referee: Shu Kawamata

19 April	Kawasaki Frontale	6–0	Shimizu S-Pulse	Kawasaki
19:00	Tono 13', 16'; Kurumaya 58'; João Schmidt (yellow card) 61'; Seko 69'; Wakizaka 84', 89'	Report	Kololli (yellow card) 53'	Stadium: Kawasaki Todoroki Stadium; Attendance: 15,081; Referee: Keigo Sendachi

24 May	Urawa Red Diamonds	2–1	Kawasaki Frontale	Saitama
19:30	Kanté 51'; João Schmidt 89' (o.g.)	Report	Segawa 3'; Kozuka (yellow card) 47'; Ienaga (yellow card) 88'	Stadium: Saitama Stadium 2002; Attendance: 12,366; Referee: Yoshimi Yamashita

16 June	Shonan Bellmare	2–3	Kawasaki Frontale	Hiratsuka
18:00	Ohashi 6', 59'	Report	Seko 73'; Segawa (yellow card) 85'; Yamada 88'; Tono 90+4'	Stadium: Lemon Gas Stadium Hiratsuka; Attendance: 10,374; Referee: Koei Koya

=== AFC Champions League ===
Frontale qualified to play the 2023–24 AFC Champions League, after finishing the 2022 J1 League as runners-up. The club earned a direct spot into the competition's group stage. The group stage is planned by the AFC to start on 18 September 2023.

==== Group stage ====
Pos	Team	Pld	W	D	L	GF	GA	GD	Pts	Qualification	KWF	UHD	JDT	BGP
1	(Japan) Kawasaki Frontale	6	5	1	0	17	6	+11	16	Advance to round of 16	—	1–0	5–0	4–2
2	(South Korea) Ulsan Hyundai	6	3	1	2	12	8	+4	10	Advance to round of 16	2–2	—	3–1	3–1
3	(Malaysia) Johor Darul Ta'zim	6	3	0	3	11	13	−2	9		0–1	2–1	—	4–1
4	(Thailand) BG Pathum United	6	0	0	6	9	22	−13	0		2–4	1–3	2–4	—

Source: AFC
Rules for classification: Tiebreakers

19 September 2023 Matchday 1	Johor Darul Ta'zim (Malaysia)	0-1	(Japan) Kawasaki Frontale	Johor, Malaysia
		Report	Marcinho 45'	Stadium: Sultan Ibrahim Stadium; Attendance: 24,597; Referee: Abdulrahman Al-Jassim (Qatar)

3 October 2023 Matchday 2	Kawasaki Frontale (Japan)	1-0	(South Korea) Ulsan Hyundai	Kawasaki, Japan
	Tachibanada 89'	Report		Stadium: Kawasaki Todoroki Stadium; Attendance: 9,382; Referee: Mohammed Khled Al Hoish (Saudi Arabia)

24 October 2023 Matchday 3	BG Pathum United (Thailand)	2-4	(Japan) Kawasaki Frontale	Pathum Thani, Thailand
	Sergeev 45+1'; Cardozo 82' (pen.)		Tono 14'; Tachibanada 52'; Marcinho 68'; Ominami 77'	Stadium: BG Stadium; Attendance: 6,998; Referee: Mouood Bonyadifar (Iran)

8 November 2023 Matchday 4	Kawasaki Frontale (Japan)	4-2	(Thailand) BG Pathum United	Kawasaki, Japan
	Wakizaka 16' (pen.), 40' (pen.); Yamamura 68'; Miyashiro 90+8'	Report	Chanathip 33', 41'	Stadium: Kawasaki Todoroki Stadium; Attendance: 9,441; Referee: Abdulrahman Al-Jassim (Qatar)

29 November 2023 Matchday 5	Kawasaki Frontale (Japan)	5-0	(Malaysia) Johor Darul Ta'zim	Kawasaki, Japan
	Ienaga 8'; Damião 50'; Marcinho 60'; Kobayashi 69'; Yamane 88'	Report		Stadium: Kawasaki Todoroki Stadium; Attendance: 9,274; Referee: Mohammed Abdulla Hassan Mohamed (United Arab Emirates)

13 December 2023 Matchday 6	Ulsan Hyundai (South Korea)	2–2	(Japan) Kawasaki Frontale	Ulsan Munsu Football Stadium, Ulsan
	Ádám 44', 53' (pen.)	Report	Tono 17'; Seko 31'	Attendance: 5,247; Referee: Alireza Faghani (Australia)

== Goalscorers ==
As of 24 July 2023

Rank	Pos.	No.	Player	J1 League	Emperor's Cup	J.League Cup	AFC Champions	Total
1	FW	33	(Japan) Taisei Miyashiro	6	2	1	0	9
2	MF	14	(Japan) Yasuto Wakizaka	4	0	2	0	6
3	MF	19	(Japan) Daiya Tono	0	2	3	0	5
4	FW	30	(Japan) Yusuke Segawa	3	0	1	0	4
4	MF	16	(Japan) Tatsuki Seko	1	1	2	0	4
6	FW	20	(Japan) Shin Yamada	2	0	1	0	3
7	DF	2	(Japan) Kyohei Noborizato	2	0	0	0	2
7	FW	11	(Japan) Yu Kobayashi	2	0	0	0	2
7	MF	41	(Japan) Akihiro Ienaga	2	0	0	0	2
10	DF	7	(Japan) Shintaro Kurumaya	0	0	1	0	1
10	MF	8	(Japan) Kento Tachibanada	1	0	0	0	1
10	DF	13	(Japan) Miki Yamane	1	0	0	0	1
10	MF	18	(Thailand) Chanathip Songkrasin	0	0	1	0	1
Total				24	5	12	0	41
