= 2021 Kawasaki Frontale season =

Kawasaki Frontale
2021 season
- Chairman: Yoshihiro Warashina
- Manager: Toru Oniki
- Stadium: Kawasaki Todoroki Stadium
- J1 League: Champions
- Emperor's Cup: Semi-finals
- J. League Cup: Quarter-finals
- AFC Champions League: Round of 16
- Japanese Super Cup: Winners
- Top goalscorer: League: Leandro Damião (23 goals); All: Leandro Damião (31 goals)
Home colours	Away colours

The 2021 season was Kawasaki Frontale's 17th consecutive season in the J1 League, where they lifted the title for the fourth time in five years. They also competed in the AFC Champions League, Emperor's Cup, J.League Cup, and the Japanese Super Cup.

== Squad ==
As of 1 July 2021.

=== First-team squad ===
Note: Flags indicate national team as defined under FIFA eligibility rules; some limited exceptions apply. Players may hold more than one non-FIFA nationality.

No.	Pos.	Nation	Player
1	GK	KOR	Jung Sung-ryong
2	DF	JPN	Kyohei Noborizato (vice-captain)
3	MF	JPN	Koki Tsukagawa
4	DF	BRA	Jesiel
5	MF	JPN	Shogo Taniguchi (captain)
6	MF	BRA	João Schmidt
7	DF	JPN	Shintaro Kurumaya
8	MF	JPN	Yasuto Wakizaka (vice-captain)
9	FW	BRA	Leandro Damião (vice-captain)
10	MF	JPN	Ryota Oshima
11	FW	JPN	Yu Kobayashi
13	DF	JPN	Miki Yamane
15	DF	JPN	Zain Issaka
16	MF	JPN	Tatsuya Hasegawa
17	MF	JPN	Kazuki Kozuka

No.	Pos.	Nation	Player
19	FW	JPN	Daiya Tono
20	FW	JPN	Kei Chinen
21	GK	JPN	Shunsuke Ando
22	MF	JPN	Kento Tachibanada
23	FW	BRA	Marcinho
24	FW	JPN	Ten Miyagi
26	DF	JPN	Kaito Kamiya
27	GK	JPN	Kenta Tanno
28	MF	JPN	Kazuya Yamamura
30	DF	JPN	Shuto Tanabe
31	MF	JPN	Renji Matsui
32	GK	JPN	Yuki Hayasaka
33	FW	JPN	Taiyo Igarashi
34	DF	JPN	Kota Takai
40	GK	KOR	Lee Kyung-tae
41	MF	JPN	Akihiro Ienaga
47	FW	JPN	Reo Hatate

=== Out on loan ===
Note: Flags indicate national team as defined under FIFA eligibility rules; some limited exceptions apply. Players may hold more than one non-FIFA nationality.

No.	Pos.	Nation	Player
—	FW	JPN	Taisei Miyashiro (at Tokushima Vortis until 31 January 2022)
—	MF	JPN	Koki Harada (at Gainare Tottori until 31 January 2022)

No.	Pos.	Nation	Player
—	DF	BRA	Maguinho (at Yokohama FC until 1 Jan 2022)
—	MF	JPN	Ao Tanaka (at Fortuna Düsseldorf until 30 June 2022)

== Transfers ==
=== Transfers in ===
Date	Position	Player	From	Type	Source
1 Feb 2021	DF	(Japan) Shuto Tanabe	(Japan) Shizuoka Gakuen High School	Full	
1 Feb 2021	MF	(Japan) Kento Tachibanada	(Japan) Toin University	Full	
1 Feb 2021	FW	(Japan) Ten Miyagi	(Japan) Kataller Toyama	Loan return	
1 Feb 2021	FW	(Japan) Kei Chinen	(Japan) Oita Trinita	Loan return	
1 Feb 2021	FW	(Japan) Daiya Tono	(Japan) Avispa Fukuoka	Loan return	
1 Feb 2021	MF	(Japan) Koki Tsukagawa	(Japan) Matsumoto Yamaga FC	Full	
1 Feb 2021	MF	(Japan) Kazuki Kozuka	(Japan) Oita Trinita	Full	
1 Feb 2021	MF	(South Korea) Lee Kyung-tae	(Japan) Fagiano Okayama	Loan extension	
1 Feb 2021	MF	(Brazil) João Schmidt	(Japan) Nagoya Grampus	Full	
26 Feb 2021	MF	(Japan) Renji Matsui	(Japan) Hosei University	Special Designated Player	
30 Apr 2021	MF	(Japan) Yuki Hayasaka	(Japan) Toin University of Yokohama	Special Designated Player	
13 Aug 2021	FW	(Brazil) Marcinho	(China) Chongqing Liangjiang	Full	
27 Aug 2021	DF	(Japan) Kota Takai	(Japan) Kawasaki Frontale U-18	Full	
27 Aug 2021	FW	(Japan) Taiyo Igarashi	(Japan) Kawasaki Frontale U-18	Full	

=== Transfers out ===
Date	Position	Player	To	Type	Source
1 Jan 2021	MF	(Japan) Kengo Nakamura		Retired	
1 Feb 2021	DF	(Japan) Kazuaki Mawatari	(Japan) Omiya Ardija	Full	
1 Feb 2021	GK	(Japan) William Popp	(Japan) Oita Trinita	Full	
1 Feb 2021	DF	(Brazil) Maguinho	(Japan) Yokohama FC	Loan	
1 Feb 2021	MF	(Japan) Yuto Suzuki	(Japan) Júbilo Iwata	Full	
1 Feb 2021	DF	(Brazil) Diogo Mateus	(Brazil) Ferroviária	Loan return	
1 Feb 2021	MF	(Japan) Hokuto Shimoda	(Japan) Oita Trinita	Full	
1 Feb 2021	DF	(Philippines) Jefferson Tabinas	(Japan) Mito HollyHock	Full	
7 Jan 2021	MF	(Japan) Hidemasa Morita	(Portugal) Santa Clara	Full	
8 Jan 2021	FW	(Japan) Taisei Miyashiro	(Japan) Tokushima Vortis	Loan	
8 Jan 2021	MF	(Japan) Koki Harada	(Japan) Gainare Tottori	Loan	
9 Jan 2021	MF	(Japan) Manabu Saito	(Japan) Nagoya Grampus	Full	
9 Jan 2021	MF	(Brazil) Caio César	(Japan) V-Varen Nagasaki	Full	
1 Jul 2021	MF	(Japan) Ao Tanaka	(Germany) Fortuna Düsseldorf	Loan	
10 Aug 2021	MF	(Japan) Kaoru Mitoma	(England) Brighton and Hove Albion	Full	

== Competitions ==
=== J1 League ===
==== Table ====
Pos	Team	Pld	W	D	L	GF	GA	GD	Pts	Qualification or relegation
1	Kawasaki Frontale (C)	38	28	8	2	81	28	+53	92	Qualification for the AFC Champions League group stage
2	Yokohama F. Marinos	38	24	7	7	82	35	+47	79	Qualification for the AFC Champions League group stage
3	Vissel Kobe	38	21	10	7	62	36	+26	73	Qualification for the AFC Champions League play-off round
4	Kashima Antlers	38	21	6	11	62	36	+26	69	
5	Nagoya Grampus	38	19	9	10	44	30	+14	66	

Source: J.League Data Site
Rules for classification: 1) Points; 2) Goal difference; 3) Goals scored; 4) Head-to-head points; 5) Head-to-head goal difference; 6) Head-to-head goal scored; 7) Fair-play points.
(C) Champions

==== Results summary ====
Overall								Home						Away					
Pld	W	D	L	GF	GA	GD	Pts	W	D	L	GF	GA	GD	W	D	L	GF	GA	GD
38	28	8	2	81	28	+53	92	16	3	0	39	14	+25	12	5	2	42	14	+28

Source: see below

==== Results by matchday ====
Round	1	2	3	4	5	6	7	8	9	10	11	12	13	14	15	16	17	18	19	20	21	22	23	24	25	26	27	28	29	30	31	32	33	34	35	36	37	38
Ground	H	A	H	H	A	A	H	H	A	H	H	H	A	H	H	A	H	A	H	H	A	A	A	A	A	A	A	H	A	H	H	A	H	A	H	A	H	A
Result	W	W	W	W	D	W	W	W	W	D	W	W	W	W	W	D	W	W	W	D	W	W	W	D	D	L	W	W	W	W	W	W	W	D	L	W	W	D
Position	3	1	1	1	1	1	1	1	1	1	1	1	1	1	1	1	1	1	1	1	1	1	1	1	1	1	1	1	1	1	1	1	1	1	1	1	1	1

Updated to match(es) played on 17 March 2021. Source: See Below
A = Away; H = Home; W = Win; D = Draw; L = Loss

==== Matches ====
26 February 2021 1	Kawasaki Frontale	2–0	Yokohama F. Marinos	Kawasaki, Kanagawa
18:00 JST	Ienaga 21' 43'	Report		Stadium: Kawasaki Todoroki Stadium; Attendance: 4,868; Referee: Yuichi Nishimura

3 March 2021 11	Kawasaki Frontale	3–2	Cerezo Osaka	Kawasaki
18:00 JST	Leandro Damião 7' 47'; Mitoma 62'	Report	Okubo 5' 22'	Stadium: Kawasaki Todoroki Stadium; Attendance: 4,756; Referee: Ryuji Sato

6 March 2021 2	Vegalta Sendai	1–5	Kawasaki Frontale	Sendai
14:00 JST	Uehara 58'	Report	Kobayashi 12' 39'; Tono 25'; Hachisuka 33' (o.g.); Hatate 83'	Stadium: Yurtec Stadium Sendai; Attendance: 9,005; Referee: Akihiko Ikeuchi

10 March 2021 3	Kawasaki Frontale	2–0	Tokushima Vortis	Kawasaki
19:00 JST	Leandro Damião 12' 42'	Report		Stadium: Kawasaki Todoroki Stadium; Attendance: 4,853; Referee: Hiroyuki Kimura

13 March 2021 4	Kawasaki Frontale	1–0	Kashiwa Reysol	Kawasaki
17:00 JST	Ienaga 80'	Report		Stadium: Kawasaki Todoroki Stadium; Attendance: 4,744; Referee: Hajime Matsuo

17 March 2021 5	Vissel Kobe	1–1	Kawasaki Frontale	Kobe, Hyogo
19:00 JST	Kikuchi 90+10'	Report	Leandro Damião 72'	Stadium: Noevir Stadium Kobe; Attendance: 7,446; Referee: Masaaki Iemoto

21 March 2021 6	Urawa Reds	0–5	Kawasaki Frontale	Urawa
15:00 JST		Report	Kobayashi 42' 53'; Leandro Damião 49'; Hatate 51'; Wakizaka 67'	Stadium: Saitama Stadium 2002; Attendance: 4,679; Referee: Jumpei Iida

3 April 2021 7	Kawasaki Frontale	2–0	Oita Trinita	Kawasaki
19:00 JST	Mitoma 39' 66'	Report		Stadium: Kawasaki Todoroki Stadium; Attendance: 9,807; Referee: Ryo Tanimoto

7 April 2021 8	Kawasaki Frontale	1–0	Sagan Tosu	Kawasaki
19:00 JST	Tono 65'	Report		Stadium: Kawasaki Todoroki Stadium; Attendance: 9,173; Referee: Yudai Yamamoto

11 April 2021 9	FC Tokyo	2–4	Kawasaki Frontale	Chōfu, Tokyo
14:00 JST	Adaílton 59'; Uchida 84'	Report	Ienaga 8' 17'; Mitoma 61'; Leandro Damião 75'	Stadium: Ajinomoto Stadium; Attendance: 17,615; Referee: Koichiro Fukushima

14 April 2021 19	Kawasaki Frontale	3–1	Avispa Fukuoka	Kawasaki
19:00 JST	Tono 19'; Chinen 55'; Yamane 90+5'	Report	Salomonsson 45+3'	Stadium: Kawasaki Todoroki Stadium; Attendance: 6,958; Referee: Masaaki Iemoto

18 April 2021 10	Kawasaki Frontale	1–1	Sanfrecce Hiroshima	Kawasaki
14:00 JST	Ienaga 38'	Report	Morishima 65'	Stadium: Kawasaki Todoroki Stadium; Attendance: 9,720; Referee: Hiroki Kasahara

29 April 2021 22	Nagoya Grampus	0–4	Kawasaki Frontale	Toyota, Aichi
15:00 JST		Report	Hatate 3'; Leandro Damião 10' 23'; Tono 84'	Stadium: Toyota Stadium; Attendance: 9,693; Referee: Yusuke Araki

4 May 2021 12	Kawasaki Frontale	3–2	Nagoya Grampus	Kawasaki
15:00 JST	Jesiel 31'; Yamane 50'; Maruyama 59' (o.g.)	Report	Inagaki 73'; Mateus 83'	Stadium: Kawasaki Todoroki Stadium; Attendance: 4,954; Referee: Yuichi Nishimura

8 May 2021 13	Gamba Osaka	0–2	Kawasaki Frontale	Suita, Osaka
18:00 JST		Report	Leandro Damião 41'; Mitoma 76'	Stadium: Panasonic Stadium Suita; Attendance: 0 Referee: Ryo Tanimoto

12 May 2021 20	Kawasaki Frontale	2–2	Vegalta Sendai	Kawasaki
19:00 JST	Kobayashi 3'; Mitoma 83'	Report	Nakahara 74'; Martinus 90+5'	Stadium: Kawasaki Todoroki Stadium; Attendance: 4,752; Referee: Yoshiro Imamura

16 May 2021 14	Kawasaki Frontale	2–0	Hokkaido Consadole Sapporo	Kawasaki
15:00 JST	Mitoma 49'; Kobayashi 90+4'	Report		Stadium: Kawasaki Todoroki Stadium; Attendance: 4,932; Referee: Hiroyoshi Takayama

22 May 2021 15	Kawasaki Frontale	3–1	Yokohama FC	Kawasaki
15:00 JST	Ienaga 19' (pen.); Tanaka 28'; Mitoma 47'	Report	Kléber 63'	Stadium: Kawasaki Todoroki Stadium; Attendance: 4,942; Referee: Jumpei Iida

26 May 2021 16	Shonan Bellmare	1–1	Kawasaki Frontale	Hiratsuka, Kanagawa
19:00 JST	Yamada 56'	Report	Leandro Damião 82'	Stadium: Shonan BMW Stadium Hiratsuka; Attendance: 4,947; Referee: Masaaki Toma

30 May 2021 17	Kawasaki Frontale	2–1	Kashima Antlers	Kawasaki
19:00 JST	Leandro Damião 19'; Kobayashi 90+4'	Report	Ueda 61'	Stadium: Kawasaki Todoroki Stadium; Attendance: 4,958; Referee: Yuichi Nishimura

2 June 2021 21	Yokohama FC	0–2	Kawasaki Frontale	Kanagawa-ku, Yokohama
19:00 JST		Report	Kobayashi 39' 67'	Stadium: NHK Spring Mitsuzawa Football Stadium; Attendance: 4,855; Referee: Hiroki Kasahara

17 July 2021 18	Shimizu S-Pulse	0–2	Kawasaki Frontale	Shimizu-ku, Shizuoka
18:30 JST		Report	Wakizaka 17'; Oshima 50'	Stadium: IAI Stadium Nihondaira; Attendance: 9,015; Referee: Yoshiro Imamura

9 August 2021 23	Oita Trinita	0–2	Kawasaki Frontale	Ōita, Ōita
19:00 JST		Report	Leandro Damião 10'; Tono 77'	Stadium: Showa Denko Dome Oita; Attendance: 7,817; Referee: Yusuke Araki

14 August 2021 24	Kashiwa Reysol	0–0	Kawasaki Frontale	Kashiwa, Chiba
19:00 JST		Report		Stadium: Sankyo Frontier Kashiwa Stadium; Attendance: 3,931; Referee: Akihiko Ikeuchi

21 August 2021 25	Sanfrecce Hiroshima	1–1	Kawasaki Frontale	Hiroshima
19:00 JST	Kashiwa 27'	Report	Leandro Damião 73'	Stadium: Edion Stadium Hiroshima; Attendance: 4,885; Referee: Nobutsugu Murakami

25 August 2021 26	Avispa Fukuoka	1–0	Kawasaki Frontale	Fukuoka
19:00 JST	Croux 66'	Report		Stadium: Best Denki Stadium; Attendance: 4,461; Referee: Hiroyuki Kimura

28 August 2021 27	Hokkaido Consadole Sapporo	0–2	Kawasaki Frontale	Sapporo
14:00 JST		Report	Kobayashi 34'; Tono 39'	Stadium: Sapporo Atsubetsu Stadium; Attendance: 5,610; Referee: Takuto Okabe

18 September 2021 29	Tokushima Vortis	1–3	Kawasaki Frontale	Naruto, Tokushima
18:30 JST	Ichimi 38'	Report	Chinen 34' (pen.), 52'; Wakizaka 42'	Stadium: Pocarisweat Stadium; Attendance: 6,464; Referee: Yusuke Araki

22 September 2021 32	Kashima Antlers	1–2	Kawasaki Frontale	Kashima, Ibaraki
19:00 JST	Juan Alano 61'	Report	Yamamura 83'; Miyagi 90+4'	Stadium: Kashima Soccer Stadium; Attendance: 4,925; Referee: Hiroyuki Kimura

26 September 2021 30	Kawasaki Frontale	2–1	Shonan Bellmare	Kawasaki
17:00 JST	Hatate 66'; Chinen 90+4'	Report	Tanaka 15'	Stadium: Kawasaki Todoroki Stadium; Attendance: 4,897; Referee: Yoshiro Imamura

29 September 2021 28	Kawasaki Frontale	3–1	Vissel Kobe	Kawasaki
19:00 JST	Ienaga (penalty missed) 85'; Leandro Damião 56' (pen.); Vermaelen 72' (o.g.)	Report	Muto 13'	Stadium: Kawasaki Todoroki Stadium; Attendance: 4,932; Referee: Masuya Ueda

2 October 2021 31	Kawasaki Frontale	1–0	FC Tokyo	Kawasaki
17:00 JST	Leandro Damião 45+1'	Report		Stadium: Kawasaki Todoroki Stadium; Attendance: 9,789; Referee: Yudai Yamamoto

24 October 2021 33	Kawasaki Frontale	1–0	Shimizu S-Pulse	Kawasaki
17:00 JST	Leandro Damião 47'	Report		Stadium: Kawasaki Todoroki Stadium; Attendance: 11,576; Referee: Jumpei Iida

3 November 2021 34	Kawasaki Frontale	1–1	Urawa Reds	Kawasaki
13:05 JST	Jesiel 33'	Report	Sakai 89'	Stadium: Kawasaki Todoroki Stadium; Attendance: 11,603; Referee: Hiroyuki Kimura

7 November 2021 35	Sagan Tosu	3–1	Kawasaki Frontale	Tosu
14:00 JST	Iwasaki 3'; Sakai 20'; Koyamatsu 32' (pen.)	Report	Leandro Damião 90+1'	Stadium: Ekimae Real Estate Stadium; Attendance: 9148; Referee: Yoshiro Imamura

20 November 2021 36	Cerezo Osaka	1–4	Kawasaki Frontale	Nagai, Osaka
14:00 JST	Okuno 80'	Report	Leandro Damião 5', 40'; Marcinho 49'; Miyagi 85'	Stadium: Yodoko Sakura Stadium; Attendance: 9,800; Referee: Yuichi Nishimura

27 November 2021 37	Kawasaki Frontale	4–1	Gamba Osaka	Kawasaki
14:00 JST	Leandro Damião 7', 85'; Hatate 9'; Kurumaya 90+4'	Report	Usami 17'	Stadium: Kawasaki Todoroki Stadium; Attendance: 14,867; Referee: Takuto Okabe

4 December 2021 38	Yokohama F. Marinos	1–1	Kawasaki Frontale	Yokohama
14:00 JST	Maeda 74'	Report	Leandro Damião 67'	Stadium: Nissan Stadium; Attendance: 30,657; Referee: Masaaki Iemoto

=== Emperor's Cup ===
==== Results ====
9 June 2021 Second round	Kawasaki Frontale	1–1 (a.e.t.) (4–3 p)	AC Nagano Parceiro	Kawasaki
18:00 JST	Tachibanada 90+1'	Report	Fujiyama 42'	Stadium: Kawasaki Todoroki Stadium; Attendance: 4,508; Referee: Keigo Sendachi
	Penalties
	Kobayashi (penalty scored); Yamamura (penalty scored); Kurumaya (penalty scored); Tono (penalty missed); Ienaga (penalty scored)		Fujiyama (penalty scored); Mizutani (penalty missed); Azuma (penalty missed); Yamamoto (penalty scored); Yoshimura (penalty scored)

21 July 2021 Third round	Kawasaki Frontale	1–1 (a.e.t.) (4–3 p)	JEF United Chiba	Chiba
18:00 JST	Ienaga 59' (pen.)	Report	Miki 53'	Stadium: Fukuda Denshi Arena; Attendance: 4,553; Referee: Hayato Shimizu
	Penalties
	Chinen (penalty scored); Yamamura (penalty scored); Hasegawa (penalty scored); Kurumaya (penalty scored)		Sakuragawa (penalty scored); Yada (penalty scored); Iwasaki (penalty missed); Fukumitsu (penalty scored); Kumagai (penalty missed)

18 August 2021 Fourth round	Kawasaki Frontale	2–1	Shimizu S-Pulse	Shizuoka
19:00 JST	Kobayashi 57' (pen.); Leandro Damião 74'	Report	Nakayama 64'	Stadium: IAI Stadium Nihondaira; Referee: Masuya Ueda

27 October 2021 Quarter-finals	Kawasaki Frontale	3–1	Kashima Antlers	Kawasaki
18:00	Machida 32' (o.g.); Hatate 48'; Wakizaka 51'	Report	Araki 90'	Stadium: Todoroki Athletics Stadium; Attendance: 9,776; Referee: Nobutsugu Murakami

12 December 2021 Semifinals	Kawasaki Frontale	1–1 (a.e.t.) (4–5 p)	Oita Trinita	Kawasaki
14:00	Kobayashi 113'	Report	Henrique Trevisan 120+1'	Stadium: Todoroki Athletics Stadium; Attendance: 17,595; Referee: Hajime Matsuo
	Penalties
	Chinen (penalty scored); Yamamura (penalty missed); Kozuka (penalty scored); Tsukagawa (penalty missed); Kobayashi (penalty scored); Taniguchi (penalty scored); Yamane (penalty missed)		Shimoda (penalty scored); Nagasawa (penalty missed); Matsumoto (penalty scored); Henrique Trevisan (penalty scored); Kobayashi (penalty missed); Misao (penalty scored); Machida (penalty scored)

=== J.League Cup ===
==== Prime stage ====
1 September 2021 Quarter-final 1st leg	Urawa Red Diamonds	1–1	Kawasaki Frontale	Saitama
19:00 JST	Sekine 35'	Report	Ienaga 72' (pen.)	Stadium: Urawa Komaba Stadium; Attendance: 4,629; Referee: Yuichi Nishimura

5 September 2021 Quarter-final 2nd leg	Kawasaki Frontale	3–3	Urawa Red Diamonds	Kawasaki
18:00 JST	Leandro Damião 40'; Yamamura 77'; João Schmidt 83'	Report	Esaka 8'; Junker 87'; Makino 90+4'	Stadium: Todoroki Athletics Stadium; Attendance: 4,936; Referee: Masaaki Toma

=== Japanese Super Cup ===
20 February 2021	Kawasaki Frontale	3–2	Gamba Osaka	Saitama Stadium 2002
13:35	Mitoma 29' 32'; Kobayashi 90+6'	Report	Yajima 60'; Patric 67' (pen.)	Attendance: 4,208; Referee: Yusuke Araki

=== AFC Champions League ===
==== Group stage ====
Pos	Team	Pld	W	D	L	GF	GA	GD	Pts	Qualification	KAW	DAE	UNI	BJG
1	(Japan) Kawasaki Frontale	6	6	0	0	27	3	+24	18	Round of 16	—	3–2	8–0	4–0
2	(South Korea) Daegu FC	6	4	0	2	22	6	+16	12	Round of 16	1–3	—	7–0	5–0
3	(Philippines) United City	6	1	1	4	4	24	−20	4		0–2	0–4	—	1–1
4	(China) Beijing Guoan	6	0	1	5	3	23	−20	1		0–7	0–3	2–3	—

Source: AFC

==== Matches ====
26 June 2021 1	Kawasaki Frontale (Japan)	3–2	(South Korea) Daegu FC	Tashkent, Uzbekistan
21:00 UTC+5	Leandro Damião 41' 52'; João Schmidt 55'	Report	Hwang Soon-min 8'; Cesinha 46'	Stadium: Lokomotiv Stadium; Attendance: 0 Referee: Ahmed Al-Kaf (Oman)

29 June 2021 2	Beijing Guoan (China)	0–7	(Japan) Kawasaki Frontale	Tashkent, Uzbekistan
21:00 UTC+5		Report	Hasegawa 7'; Tachibanada 8'; Tono 41'; Chinen 47' (pen.), 59'; Yamamura 51'; Wakizaka 56'	Stadium: Lokomotiv Stadium; Attendance: 0 Referee: Masoud Tufayelieh (Syria)

2 July 2021 3	Kawasaki Frontale (Japan)	8–0	(Philippines) United City	Tashkent, Uzbekistan
19:00 UTC+5	Mitoma 34', 82'; Oshima 42'; Leandro Damião 50'; Tachibanada 56', 65', 70'; Wakizaka 90+2'	Report		Stadium: Lokomotiv Stadium; Attendance: 0 Referee: Hassan Akrami (Iran)

5 July 2021 4	United City (Philippines)	0–2	(Japan) Kawasaki Frontale	Tashkent, Uzbekistan
19:00 UTC+5		Report	Chinen 18'; Hasegawa 78'	Stadium: Lokomotiv Stadium; Attendance: 0 Referee: Omar Mohamed Al Ali (United Arab Emirates)

8 July 2021 5	Daegu FC (South Korea)	1–3	(Japan) Kawasaki Frontale	Tashkent, Uzbekistan
21:00 UTC+5	Edgar 43'	Report	Leandro Damião 34', 64', 87'	Stadium: Bunyodkor Stadium; Attendance: 0 Referee: Abdulrahman Al-Jassim (Qatar)

11 July 2021 6	Kawasaki Frontale (Japan)	4–0	(China) Beijing Guoan	Tashkent, Uzbekistan
17:00 UTC+5	Chinen 21'; Kozuka 36'; Miyagi 55'; Leng Jixuan 68' (o.g.)	Report		Stadium: Lokomotiv Stadium; Attendance: 0 Referee: Mohammed Al-Hoish (Saudi Arabia)

14 September 2021 R16 East 1	Ulsan Hyundai (South Korea)	0–0 (a.e.t.) (3–2 p)	(Japan) Kawasaki Frontale	Ulsan Munsu Football Stadium, Ulsan
--:-- UTC+9		Live Report; Stats Report		Attendance: 0 Referee: Mohammed Abdulla Hassan Mohamed (United Arab Emirates)
	Penalties
	Lee Chung-yong (penalty scored); Won Du-jae (penalty missed); Lee Dong-jun (penalty missed); Yun Il-lok (penalty scored); Yoon Bit-garam (penalty scored)		(penalty scored) Chinen; (penalty missed) Hasegawa; (penalty scored) Tono; (penalty missed) João Schmidt; (penalty missed) Ienaga

== Honors ==
=== Individual ===
- J.League MVP: Leandro Damião
- J.League Best XI: Miki Yamane, Shogo Taniguchi, Jesiel, Yasuto Wakizaka, Akihiro Ienaga, Reo Hatate, Leandro Damião
- J1 League Fair Play Award: Miki Yamane

== Statistics ==
=== Goal scorers ===
Rank	No.	Pos.	Player	J.League	AFC Champions League	Emperor's Cup	J.League Cup	Japanese Super Cup	Total
1	9	FW	(Brazil) Leandro Damião	23	6	1	1	0	31
2	18	FW	(Japan) Kaoru Mitoma	8	2	0	0	2	12
2	11	FW	(Japan) Yu Kobayashi	10	0	2	0	1	13
4	41	MF	(Japan) Akihiro Ienaga	8	0	1	1	0	10
5	20	FW	(Japan) Kei Chinen	4	4	0	0	0	8
6	19	FW	(Japan) Daiya Tono	6	1	0	0	0	7
7	8	FW	(Japan) Yasuto Wakizaka	3	2	1	0	0	6
8	47	FW	(Japan) Reo Hatate	5	0	1	0	0	6
8	22	MF	(Japan) Kento Tachibanada	0	4	1	0	0	5
10	28	MF	(Japan) Kazuya Yamamura	1	1	0	1	0	3
10	24	FW	(Japan) Ten Miyagi	2	1	0	0	0	3
12	13	DF	(Japan) Miki Yamane	2	0	0	0	0	2
12	16	MF	(Japan) Tatsuya Hasegawa	0	2	0	0	0	2
12	6	MF	(Brazil) João Schmidt	0	1	0	1	0	2
12	10	MF	(Japan) Ryota Oshima	1	1	0	0	0	2
12	4	DF	(Brazil) Jesiel	2	0	0	0	0	2
17	17	MF	(Japan) Kazuki Kozuka	0	1	0	0	0	1
17	25	MF	(Japan) Ao Tanaka	1	0	0	0	0	1
17	7	DF	(Japan) Shintaro Kurumaya	1	0	0	0	0	1
17	23	FW	(Brazil) Marcinho	1	0	0	0	0	1
Total				78	26	7	4	3	118

=== Clean sheets ===
Rank	No.	Pos.	Player	J.League	AFC Champions League	Emperor's Cup	J.League Cup	Japanese Super Cup	Total
1	1	GK	(South Korea) Jung Sung-ryong	14	3	0	0	0	17
2	27	GK	(Japan) Kenta Tanno	2	1	0	0	0	3
Total				16	4	0	0	0	20
