= Leandro Damião =

Brazilian footballer (born 1989)

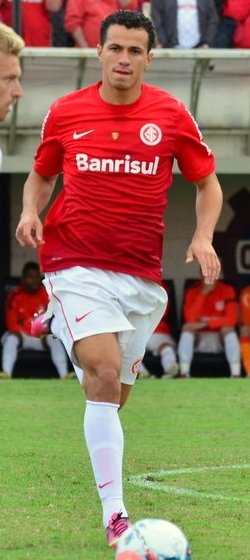
- Damião playing for Internacional in 2013

Personal information
- Full name: Leandro Damião da Silva dos Santos
- Date of birth: 22 July 1989 (age 37)
- Place of birth: Jardim Alegre, Brazil
- Height: 1.88 m (6 ft 2 in)
- Position: Striker

Youth career
- Atlético Ibirama

Senior career*
Years	Team	Apps	(Gls)
2007–2009	Atlético Ibirama	18	(8)
2007	→ XV de Indaial (loan)		
2008	→ Marcílio Dias (loan)	2	(0)
2008	→ Cidade Azul (loan)	0	(0)
2009	→ Internacional B (loan)	0	(0)
2009–2013	Internacional	150	(73)
2014–2018	Santos	39	(11)
2015	→ Cruzeiro (loan)	35	(13)
2016	→ Real Betis (loan)	3	(0)
2016–2017	→ Flamengo (loan)	32	(9)
2017–2018	→ Internacional (loan)	47	(18)
2019–2023	Kawasaki Frontale	127	(53)
2024	Coritiba	16	(3)
Total		469	(188)

International career
2012	Brazil U23	5	(6)
2011–2013	Brazil	17	(3)
Medal record
Representing Brazil
Men's Football
Silver medal – second place	2012 London	Team competition
- * Club domestic league appearances and goals

Leandro Damião da Silva dos Santos (Brazilian Portuguese: [leˈɐ̃dɾu daˈmjɐ̃w]; born 22 July 1989), known as Leandro Damião or simply Damião, is a Brazilian former professional footballer who played as a striker. He has been capped at international level by Brazil.

== Club career ==
=== Early career ===
Damião began his career as a midfielder, playing for local teams in Jardim Alegre, Paraná. Having failed a trial as a midfielder at Atlético Ibirama, he had a new opportunity as a striker and was signed by team.

Known as Leandrão at the time, Damião was first loaned to XV de Outubro de Indaial in 2007, before playing the 2008 Campeonato Brasileiro Série C for Marcílio Dias; he would later join Cidade Azul in the same year. Back to Atlético Ibirama, he scored eight goals in the 2009 Campeonato Catarinense and was transferred to Internacional, initially for the under-20 team.

=== Internacional ===
At Internacional, he won three titles with the club's under-20 side and earned a call-up to the B team. He scored twice in his Campeonato Gaúcho debut and was then called up to the first team for their 2010 Copa Libertadores campaign. Damião won his first major title in August 2010 when he helped Internacional defeat Guadalajara in the Copa Libertadores Finals. He scored the club's second goal in their second leg victory in Porto Alegre to win the competition 5–3 on aggregate. His performances at the Porto Alegre club earned him a place in the Brazil national football team and praise from Ronaldo, also drawing the interest of European clubs.

"Leandro Damiao, from Internacional de Porto Alegre. He's tall, strong, a very good goalscorer, a threat in the air and skilful with both feet. He'll play a big part in 2014."

— Ronaldo, when asked to apply "the new Ronaldo" tag to one of the current Seleção crop by FIFA.com.

During the 2013 summer, he had offers from English side Tottenham Hotspur and Italian club Napoli. He was close to join the Italian side, but the deal fell through because "sponsorship contracts made it impossible". Even though the club bought Gonzalo Higuaín after failing to land the Brazilian striker, Napoli chairman Aurelio De Laurentiis later stated that Rafa Benítez wanted Damião instead of Higuaín.

=== Santos ===
After a season below standards with Internacional (only 13 goals in nearly 50 matches), Damião signed a five-year deal with fellow top-divisioner Santos FC in December, who paid a R$ 41 million fee, supported by investors, to bring Damião to Vila Belmiro. He was presented on 9 January of the following year. It was the highest fee ever paid by a Brazilian club to sign a national player, only behind the R$60.5 million that brought Carlos Tevez to Corinthians.

Damião made his Santos debut on 6 February 2014, starting in a 2–1 away win over Linense, scoring a goal which was later disallowed due to offside. He scored his first goal for Peixe on the 20th, netting his side's first of a 2–1 away success over Atlético Sorocaba; eight days later he netted his second, the last of a 5–0 home thrashing of Bragantino.

Despite scoring five goals in 13 appearances as Santos came second in the league, Damião was hugely criticised due to his lack of agility and pace, plus his inability to score on a regular basis. He only scored more than one goal with a Santos shirt on 30 November, netting both goals in a 2–0 home win against Botafogo.

==== Cruzeiro (loan) ====
On 29 December 2014, after lengthy negotiations, Damião was loaned to league champions Cruzeiro, in a season-long deal, after a largely disappointing year at Santos. He was the top goalscorer of 2015 Campeonato Mineiro with nine goals, but had a disappointing 2015 Campeonato Brasileiro Série A with only four goals scored.

==== Battle in court ====
In 2015, Damião took legal action against Santos to terminate his contract after failing to receive payment for his image rights for three months and was granted the release of his contract in December 2015. The decision was overturned the following month, with the fee of 200 million (reais for any national transfer and euros for any international) being activated if he were to sign for another club.

On 7 January 2016, Damião was again declared a free agent, but on 26 January, after being on the verge of signing for Spanish club Real Betis for a fee of R$65 million.

An agreement was reached between Damião and Santos on 30 January 2016, as the player was attempting to sign with Real Betis. On 1 February 2016, the Spanish club pulled out of the deal that would bring him on an 18-month loan, leaving the player as a free agent.

==== Betis ====
On 4 February 2016, after a turnover in the club's board which involved the president's resignation, Damião signed a six-month deal with Betis with a buyout clause set on €12 million. He made his La Liga debut 23 days later, replacing Jorge Molina after 56 minutes of an eventual 2–2 draw against Rayo Vallecano at the Estadio Benito Villamarín.

==== Flamengo (loan) ====
On 14 July 2016 Flamengo signed Damião from Santos on a one-year loan deal.

==== Internacional (loan) ====
After his loan with Flamengo ended, Damião returned on loan to Internacional, who were at the time out of promotion spots in the 2017 Campeonato Brasileiro Série B. He scored 8 times in the competition and helped Internacional to return to the first division after finishing in second place. He stayed with Internacional in 2018, helping the team finish third in the 2018 Campeonato Brasileiro Série A and scoring 10 goals in the competition, just one less than teammate Nico López. Damião scored a total of 19 goals in his second spell at Internacional, reaching a total of 109 goals scored for the club and becoming the team's 10th best all-time top scorer.

On 11 December 2018, Internacional announced that Damião would not remain at the club after the player received an "irrefusable" offer from a Japanese club.

=== Kawasaki Frontale ===
On 14 December 2018, Kawasaki Frontale announced the signing of Leandro Damião in a one-year contract for the 2019 season. On 10 March 2019 Damião scored his first goal for the club against Yokohama F. Marinos, also achieving a brace. He scored 13 goals in the 2020 J.League campaign and helped the Frontale to win the J.League title. On 1 January 2021, he assisted Kaoru Mitoma's match winning goal in a 1–0 victory over Gamba Osaka in the final of the 2020 Emperor's Cup. On 8 July, he scored a hat-trick in an AFC Champions League match against Daegu FC. He became the J.League's joint top scorer in the 2021 J.League campaign with 23 goals, winning the J.League MVP Award.

=== Retirement ===
After being without a club since leaving Coritiba, on 11 April 2025 Damião announced his retirement from football.

== International career ==
Damião was given his first call-up to the Brazil national team in March 2011 for the friendly against Scotland after Alexandre Pato withdrew from the squad due to injury. "I'm taking advantage of the circumstances to summon a player who has been playing well with Internacional and is young enough to play in the Olympics," said head coach Mano Menezes. He won his first cap in the match at the Emirates Stadium in London, which Brazil won 2–0.

Damião scored his first goal for Brazil in a 1–0 friendly win against Ghana on 5 September at Craven Cottage. He also represented Brazil at the 2012 Olympic football tournament in London, being the tournament's top scorer with six goals in five appearances as Brazil finished runners-up to Mexico.

== Career statistics ==
=== Club ===
As of 19 December 2024

Appearances and goals by club, season and competition
Club	Season	League			State league		National cup (Note: Includes Copa do Brasil, Emperor's Cup)		League cup (Note: Includes J.League Cup)		Continental		Other		Total	
Club	Season	Division	Apps	Goals	Apps	Goals	Apps	Goals	Apps	Goals	Apps	Goals	Apps	Goals	Apps	Goals
Atlético Ibirama	2008	Catarinense	—		2	0	—		—		—		—		2	0
Atlético Ibirama	2009	Catarinense	—		16	8	—		—		—		—		16	8
Atlético Ibirama	Total		0	0	18	8	0	0	0	0	0	0	0	0	18	8
Marcílio Dias (loan)	2008	Série C	2	0	—		—		—		—		—		2	0
Cidade Azul (loan)	2008	Catarinense	—		—		—		—		—		6 (Note: Appearances in Copa Santa Catarina)	0	6	0
Internacional B	2009	—	—		—		—		—		—		22 (Note: Appearances in Copa FGF)	11	22	11
Internacional	2010	Série A	25	7	8	4	—		—		1	1	1 (Note: Appearance in FIFA Club World Cup)	0	35	12
Internacional	2011	Série A	28	14	13	17	—		—		8	4	2 (Note: Appearances in Recopa Sudamericana)	3	51	38
Internacional	2012	Série A	19	7	14	11	—		—		10	6	—		43	24
Internacional	2013	Série A	26	5	17	8	5	0	—		—		—		48	13
Internacional	Total		98	33	52	40	5	0	0	0	19	11	3	3	177	87
Santos	2014	Série A	26	6	13	5	5	0	—		—		—		44	11
Cruzeiro (loan)	2015	Série A	23	4	12	9	2	1	—		9	4	—		46	18
Real Betis (loan)	2015–16	La Liga	3	0	—		—		—		—		—		3	0
Flamengo (loan)	2016	Série A	15	2	—		—		—		—		—		15	2
Flamengo (loan)	2017	Série A	7	3	10	4	2	0	—		3	1	1	0	23	8
Flamengo (loan)	Total		22	5	10	4	2	0	0	0	3	1	1	0	38	10
Internacional (loan)	2017	Série B	17	8	—		—		—		—		—		17	8
Internacional (loan)	2018	Série A	14	3	4	0	—		—		2	1	—		20	4
Internacional (loan)	Total		31	11	4	0	0	0	0	0	2	1	0	0	37	12
Kawasaki Frontale	2019	J1 League	23	9	—		1	0	5 (Note: Appearances in J.League Cup)	1	6 (Note: Appearances in AFC Champions League)	2	1 (Note: Appearance in Japanese Super Cup)	1	36	13
Kawasaki Frontale	2020	J1 League	34	13	—		4	1	1	1	—		—		39	15
Kawasaki Frontale	2021	J1 League	35	23	—		5	1	2	1	5	6	1	0	48	31
Kawasaki Frontale	2022	J1 League	23	5	—		1	0	2	0	3	2	1	0	30	7
Kawasaki Frontale	2023	J1 League	12	3	—		2	0	3	1	5	1	—		17	4
Kawasaki Frontale	Total		127	53	0	0	13	2	13	4	19	11	3	1	176	71
Coritiba	2024	Série B	12	1	4	2	—		—		—		—		16	3
Career total			345	103	113	68	27	3	13	4	52	28	30	15	585	229

=== International ===
As of 2 June 2013

Appearances and goals by national team and year
National team	Year	Apps	Goals
Brazil	2011	4	1
Brazil	2012	10	1
Brazil	2013	3	1
Total		17	3

Scores and results list Brazil's goal tally first, score column indicates score after each Damião goal.

List of international goals scored by Leandro Damião
No.	Date	Venue	Opponent	Score	Result	Competition
1	5 September 2011	Craven Cottage, London, England	Ghana	1–0	1–0	Friendly
2	15 August 2012	Råsunda Stadium, Solna Municipality, Sweden	Sweden	1–0	3–0	Friendly
3	6 April 2013	Estadio Ramón Tahuichi Aguilera, Santa Cruz de la Sierra, Bolivia	Bolivia	1–0	4–0	Friendly

== Honours ==
Internacional B

- Copa FGF: 2009

Internacional

- Copa Libertadores: 2010
- Campeonato Gaúcho: 2011, 2012, 2013
- Recopa Sudamericana: 2011

Flamengo

- Campeonato Carioca: 2017

Kawasaki Frontale

- J1 League: 2020, 2021
- Emperor's Cup: 2020, 2023
- J.League Cup: 2019
- Japanese Super Cup: 2019, 2021

Brazil U23

- Olympic Games Silver Medal: 2012

Brazil

- Superclásico de las Américas: 2011

Individual

- Olympic Games top scorer: 2012
- Campeonato Gaúcho top scorer: 2011, 2012
- Campeonato Mineiro top scorer: 2015
- J.League top scorer: 2021
- J.League MVP Award: 2021
- J.League Best XI: 2021
- Footballer of the Year in Japan: 2021
