= Yasuto Wakizaka =

Japanese footballer

Yasuto Wakizaka 脇坂 泰斗
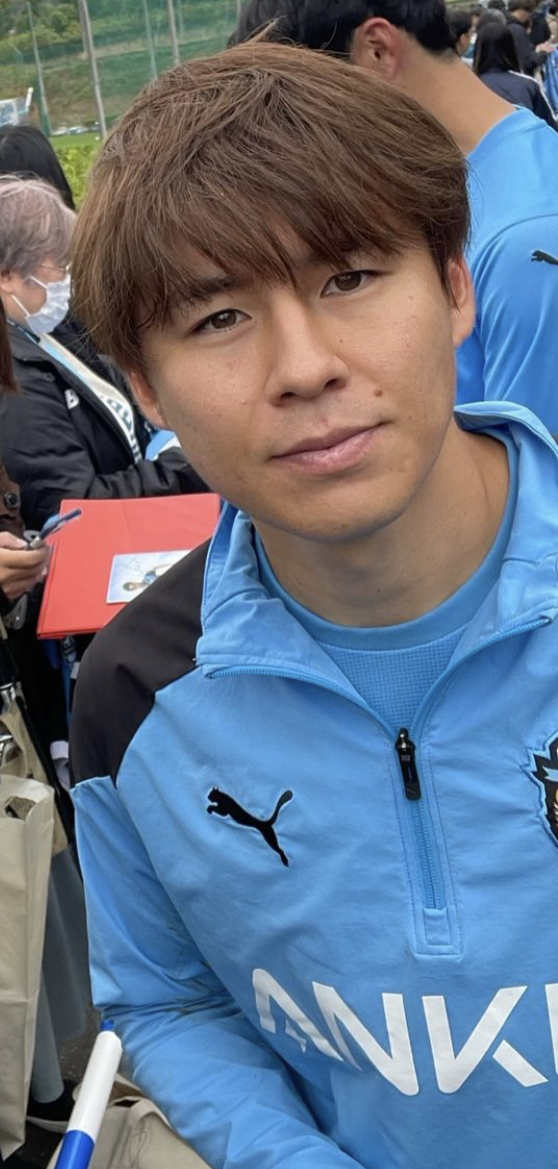

Personal information
- Full name: Yasuto Wakizaka
- Date of birth: 11 June 1995 (age 31)
- Place of birth: Sakae-ku, Yokohama, Kanagawa, Japan
- Height: 1.73 m (5 ft 8 in)
- Position: Attacking midfielder

Team information
- Current team: Kawasaki Frontale
- Number: 14

Youth career
- FC Hongo
- –2010: Esperanza SC
- 2011–2013: Kawasaki Frontale

College career
Years	Team	Apps	(Gls)
2014–2017	Hannan University		

Senior career*
Years	Team	Apps	(Gls)
2018–	Kawasaki Frontale	235	(43)

International career^{‡}
2021–	Japan	4	(0)
Medal record
Men's football
Representing Japan
EAFF Championship
Winner	2022 Japan	Team
- * Club domestic league appearances and goals as of 1 August 2026 ‡ National team caps and goals as of 27 July 2022

Yasuto Wakizaka (脇坂 泰斗, Wakizaka Yasuto; born 11 June 1995) is a Japanese professional footballer who plays as an attacking midfielder for Kawasaki Frontale and the Japan national team.

== Club career ==
Wakizawa was a member of Kawasaki Frontale U-18 team before he enrolled to Hannan University. From 2018 season, he re-joined the club and debuted in the AFC Champions League.

On 30 January 2024, it was announced that Wakizaka appointed as the new captain of Frontale for 2024 season, succeeding his teammate, Kento Tachibanada, who led the club to win 2023 Emperor's Cup.

== International career ==
He made his debut for Japan national football team on 25 March 2021 in a friendly against South Korea.

== Career statistics ==
As of match played 6 June 2026

Appearances and goals per club, season and competition
Club	Season	League			Emperor's Cup		J. League Cup		Asia		Other		Total	
Club	Season	Division	Apps	Goals	Apps	Goals	Apps	Goals	Apps	Goals	Apps	Goals	Apps	Goals
Kawasaki Frontale	2018	J1 League	0	0	1	0	0	0	1 (Note: Appearance(s) in AFC Champions League)	0	0	0	2	0
Kawasaki Frontale	2019	J1 League	18	5	3	0	4	2	3	2	0	0	28	9
Kawasaki Frontale	2020	J1 League	31	3	1	0	5	1	—		—		37	4
Kawasaki Frontale	2021	J1 League	35	3	5	1	2	0	6	2	1 (Note: Appearance in Japanese Super Cup)	0	49	6
Kawasaki Frontale	2022	J1 League	32	5	1	0	2	1	6	1	1	0	42	7
Kawasaki Frontale	2023	J1 League	30	9	5	0	5	2	5	2	—		45	13
Kawasaki Frontale	2024	J1 League	34	6	1	0	3	0	4 (Note: Two appearances in AFC Champions League, two appearances in AFC Champions League Elite)	0	0	0	42	6
Kawasaki Frontale	2025	J1 League	36	7	2	1	4	1	7 (Note: Appearances in AFC Champions League Elite)	2	—		49	11
Kawasaki Frontale	2026	J1 100	19	5	—		—		—		—		19	5
Kawasaki Frontale	2026–27	J1 League	0	0	0	0	0	0	—		—		0	0
Career total			235	43	19	2	25	7	32	9	2	0	313	61

== Honours ==
Kawasaki Frontale

- J1 League: 2018, 2020, 2021
- Emperor's Cup: 2020, 2023
- J.League Cup: 2019
- Japanese Super Cup: 2019, 2021

Japan

- EAFF Championship: 2022

Individual

- J.League Best XI: 2021, 2022, 2023
