= João Schmidt =

Brazilian footballer

- Schmidt in 2024

Personal information
- Full name: João Felipe Schmidt Urbano
- Date of birth: 19 May 1993 (age 33)
- Place of birth: São Paulo, Brazil
- Height: 1.83 m (6 ft 0 in)
- Position: Defensive midfielder

Team information
- Current team: Santos
- Number: 5

Youth career
- 2005–2013: São Paulo

Senior career*
Years	Team	Apps	(Gls)
2012–2017	São Paulo	58	(1)
2014–2015	→ Vitória Setúbal (loan)	29	(6)
2017–2019	Atalanta	0	(0)
2018–2019	→ Rio Ave (loan)	19	(3)
2019–2021	Nagoya Grampus	56	(3)
2021–2023	Kawasaki Frontale	77	(2)
2024–	Santos	118	(4)

International career
2013	Brazil U20	5	(0)
- * Club domestic league appearances and goals as of 21:48, 29 October 2026 (UTC)

João Felipe Schmidt Urbano (born 19 May 1993), known as João Schmidt, is a Brazilian professional footballer who plays as a defensive midfielder for Santos.

== Club career ==
=== São Paulo ===
Schmidt was born in São Paulo, and joined São Paulo FC's youth sides in 2005, aged 12. He made his first team – and Série A – debut on 18 July 2012, starting in a 1–0 home loss to Vasco da Gama.

Definitely promoted to the first team ahead of the 2013 season, Schmidt only featured rarely for Tricolor in the following years.

==== Loan to Vitória de Setúbal ====
In July 2014, Schmidt moved abroad for the first time in his career, joining Primeira Liga club Vitória de Setúbal on loan for the season. He made his debut abroad on 17 August, starting in a 2–0 away loss to Rio Ave.

Schmidt scored his first professional goal on 24 August 2014, netting his side's second through a penalty kick in a 2–0 home win over Gil Vicente. He was a regular starter for Vitória during his loan spell, contributing with eight goals in 34 appearances overall.

==== Return from loan ====
Schmidt returned to São Paulo in June 2015, but was rarely used by head coach Juan Carlos Osorio during the remainder of the year. He was close to a loan move to Avaí in February 2016, but the move did not materialize, and he later started to feature regularly under head coach Edgardo Bauza.

Schmidt scored his first goal for Tricolor on 6 April 2016, netting his team's third in a 6–0 home routing of Trujillanos, for the year's Copa Libertadores. After finishing the year as a starter, he rejected a contract renewal and agreed to a pre-contract with Italian side Atalanta in January 2017.

=== Atalanta ===
On 8 July 2017, Atalanta officially announced Schmidt. He made his debut for the club on 20 December, replacing Nicolas Haas in a 2–1 Coppa Italia home win over Sassuolo, but failed to feature in any Serie A matches during the season.

==== Loan to Rio Ave ====
On 6 July 2018, Schmidt returned to Portugal and joined Rio Ave on a one-year loan deal, with an option to make the move permanent. He immediately became a first-choice at his new club, scoring a brace in a 7–0 Taça de Portugal home routing of Silves on 25 November 2018.

On 2 February 2019, Rio Ave and Atalanta agreed to end the loan deal early.

=== Nagoya Grampus ===
On 6 February 2019, Nagoya Grampus announced the signing of Schmidt. A first-choice in his first year, he lost his starting spot in the 2020 campaign.

=== Kawasaki Frontale ===
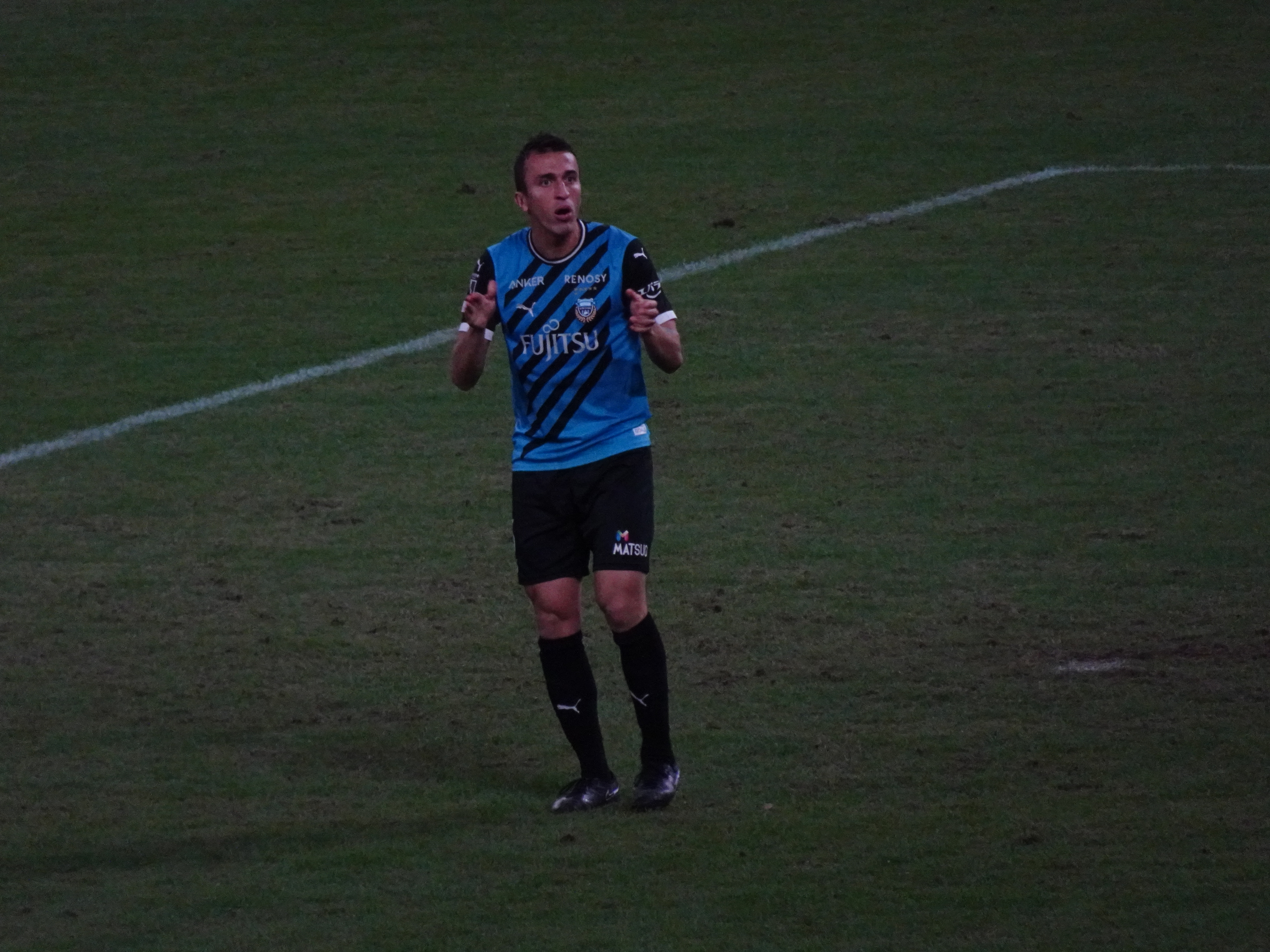
Schmidt playing for Kawasaki Frontale in the 2023 Emperor's Cup final

On 6 January 2021, Schmidt moved to fellow J1 League side Kawasaki Frontale. He helped the club to retain the league title in his first season, also winning the Japanese Super Cup in 2021 and the Emperor's Cup in 2023.

=== Santos ===
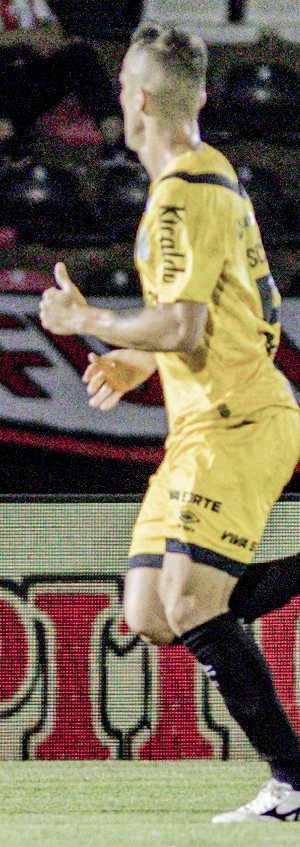
Schmidt playing for Santos in 2024

On 30 December 2023, Schmidt returned to his home country after more than six years, after being announced at Santos on a one-year deal. He made his debut for the club the following 20 January, starting in a 1–0 away win over Botafogo-SP.

Schmidt scored his first goal for Peixe on 7 February 2024, netting the winner in a 1–0 home success over rivals Corinthians. He was a regular starter during the entire season, and renewed his contract until 2027 on 25 April 2025.

On 28 January 2026, Schmidt played his 100th match for Santos in a 4–2 loss at Chapecoense.

== International career ==
Schmit was a member of the Brazil national under-20 team in the 2013 Toulon Tournament, starting in all five matches of the competition.

== Career statistics ==
As of 29 October 2026

Appearances and goals by club, season and competition
Club	Season	League			State league (Note: Includes Campeonato Paulista)		National cup (Note: Includes Copa do Brasil, Taça de Portugal, Coppa Italia, Emperor's Cup)		League cup (Note: Includes Taça da Liga, J.League Cup)		Continental		Other		Total	
Club	Season	Division	Apps	Goals	Apps	Goals	Apps	Goals	Apps	Goals	Apps	Goals	Apps	Goals	Apps	Goals
São Paulo	2012	Série A	5	0	0	0	0	0	—		1 (Note: Appearance(s) in Copa Sudamericana)	0	—		6	0
São Paulo	2013	Série A	2	0	5	0	0	0	—		0	0	0	0	7	0
São Paulo	2014	Série A	0	0	1	0	0	0	—		—		—		1	0
São Paulo	2015	Série A	4	0	—		0	0	—		—		—		4	0
São Paulo	2016	Série A	22	1	6	0	1	0	—		3 (Note: Appearances in Copa Libertadores)	1	—		32	2
São Paulo	2017	Série A	3	0	10	0	5	0	—		2	0	—		20	0
São Paulo	Total		36	1	22	0	6	0	—		6	1	0	0	70	2
Vitória de Setúbal (loan)	2014–15	Primeira Liga	29	6	—		2	0	3	2	—		—		34	8
Atalanta	2017–18	Serie A	0	0	—		1	0	—		—		—		1	0
Rio Ave (loan)	2018–19	Primeira Liga	19	3	—		3	2	2	0	1 (Note: Appearance in UEFA Europa League)	0	—		25	5
Nagoya Grampus	2019	J1 League	32	2	—		0	0	3	0	—		—		35	2
Nagoya Grampus	2020	J1 League	24	1	—		0	0	3	0	—		—		27	1
Nagoya Grampus	Total		56	3	—		0	0	6	0	—		—		62	3
Kawasaki Frontale	2021	J1 League	25	0	—		3	0	2	1	4 (Note: Appearances in AFC Champions League)	1	1 (Note: Appearance in Japanese Super Cup)	0	35	2
Kawasaki Frontale	2022	J1 League	22	1	—		2	1	2	0	3	0	1	0	30	2
Kawasaki Frontale	2023	J1 League	30	1	—		5	0	5	0	4	0	—		44	1
Kawasaki Frontale	Total		77	2	—		10	1	9	1	11	1	2	0	109	5
Santos	2024	Série B	33	0	16	1	—		—		—		—		49	1
Santos	2025	Série A	31	2	13	1	1	0	—		—		—		45	3
Santos	2026	Série A	18	0	7	0	3	0	—		6	0	—		34	0
Santos	Total		82	2	36	2	4	0	—		6	0	—		128	4
Career total			299	17	58	2	26	3	20	3	24	2	2	0	429	27

== Honours ==
São Paulo

- Copa São Paulo de Futebol Júnior: 2010
- Copa Sudamericana: 2012

Kawasaki Frontale

- J1 League: 2021
- Emperor's Cup: 2023
- Japanese Super Cup: 2021

Santos

- Campeonato Brasileiro Série B: 2024

Brazil U20

- Toulon Tournament: 2013

Individual

- Campeonato Paulista Team of the Year: 2024
