= Yusuke Segawa =

Japanese footballer

Yusuke Segawa 瀬川 祐輔
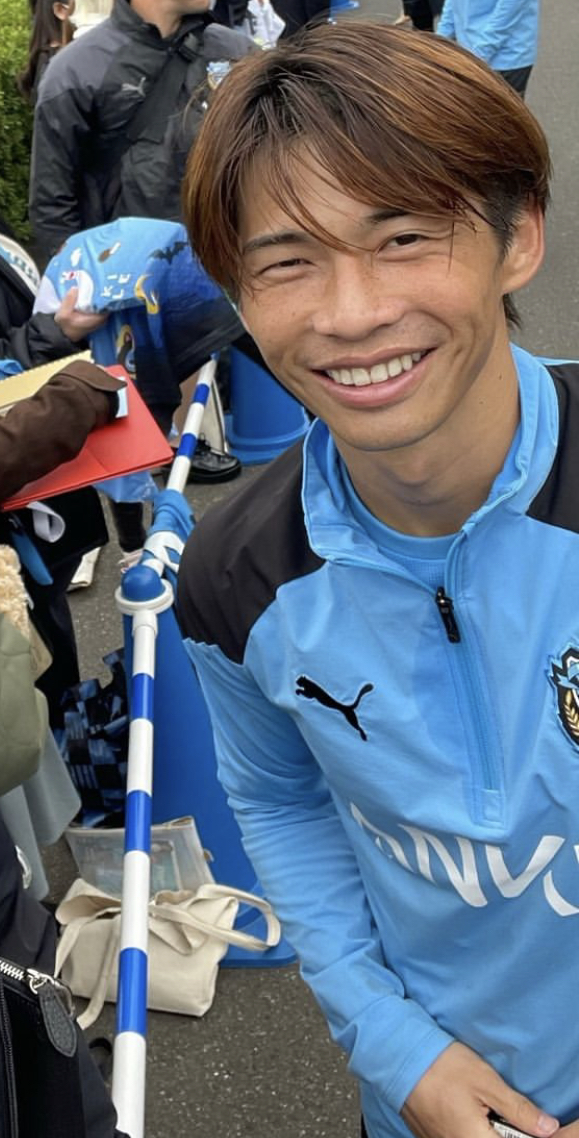
- Yusuke Segawa in 2023.

Personal information
- Full name: Yusuke Segawa
- Date of birth: 7 February 1994 (age 32)
- Place of birth: Ōta-ku, Tokyo, Japan
- Height: 1.70 m (5 ft 7 in)
- Positions: Forward; winger

Team information
- Current team: Kashiwa Reysol
- Number: 20

Youth career
- –2005: Yukigaya FC
- 2006–2008: Nihon University Daini Jr. High School
- 2009–2011: Nihon University Daini High School

College career
Years	Team	Apps	(Gls)
2012–2015	Meiji University		

Senior career*
Years	Team	Apps	(Gls)
2016	Thespakusatsu Gunma	42	(13)
2017	Omiya Ardija	16	(2)
2018–2021	Kashiwa Reysol	102	(21)
2022	Shonan Bellmare	32	(3)
2023–2025	Kawasaki Frontale	63	(8)
2025–	Kashiwa Reysol	33	(7)
- * Club domestic league appearances and goals as of 10 August 2026

Yusuke Segawa (瀬川 祐輔, Segawa Yūsuke; born 7 April 1994) is a Japanese professional footballer who plays as a forward or a winger for J1 League club Kashiwa Reysol.

== Club statistics ==
As of start of the 2023 season.

Appearances and goals by club, season and competition
Club	Season	League			Cup		League Cup		Other		Total	
Club	Season	Division	Apps	Goals	Apps	Goals	Apps	Goals	Apps	Goals	Apps	Goals
Japan			League		Emperor's Cup		J.League Cup		Other		Total	
Thespakusatsu Gunma	2016	J2 League	42	13	0	0	–		–		42	13
Omiya Ardija	2017	J1 League	16	2	2	0	1	1	–		19	3
Kashiwa Reysol	2018	J1 League	25	9	1	0	4	2	7 (Note: Appearances in the AFC Champions League)	1	37	12
Kashiwa Reysol	2019	J2 League	40	8	2	0	3	1	–		45	9
Kashiwa Reysol	2020	J1 League	19	2	0	0	3	1	–		22	3
Kashiwa Reysol	2021	J1 League	18	2	1	0	1	0	–		20	2
Kashiwa Reysol	Total		102	21	4	0	11	4	7	1	124	26
Shonan Bellmare	2022	J1 League	32	3	2	1	5	0	–		39	4
Career total			192	39	8	1	17	5	7	1	224	46

== Honours ==
Kawasaki Frontale

- Emperor's Cup: 2023
- Japanese Super Cup: 2024
