= Jardim Alegre =

Coordinates: 24°09′S 51°43′W

- Municipality
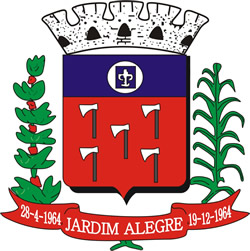
- Flag Coat of arms
- Interactive map of Jardim Alegre
- Country: Brazil
- Region: Southern
- State: Paraná
- Mesoregion: Norte Central Paranaense

Population (2020)
  - Total: 11,196
- Time zone: UTC−3 (BRT)

Jardim Alegre is a municipality in the state of Paraná in the Southern Region of Brazil.

== See also ==
- List of municipalities in Paraná
