= Kaoru Mitoma =

Japanese footballer (born 1997)

Kaoru Mitoma 三笘 薫
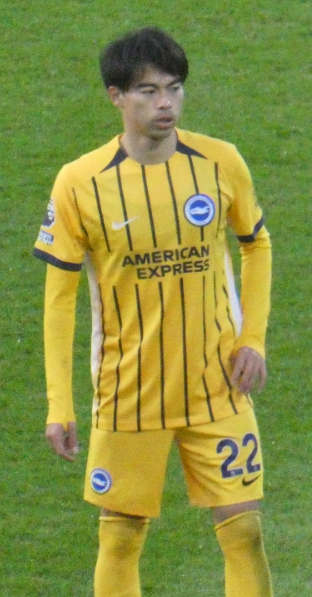
- Mitoma playing for Brighton & Hove Albion in 2026

Personal information
- Full name: Kaoru Mitoma
- Date of birth: 20 May 1997 (age 29)
- Place of birth: Hita, Ōita, Japan
- Height: 1.78 m (5 ft 10 in)
- Position: Left winger

Team information
- Current team: Brighton & Hove Albion
- Number: 7

Youth career
- –2005: Saginuma SC
- 2006–2015: Kawasaki Frontale

College career
Years	Team	Apps	(Gls)
2016–2019	University of Tsukuba		

Senior career*
Years	Team	Apps	(Gls)
2018–2021	Kawasaki Frontale	50	(21)
2021–	Brighton & Hove Albion	113	(23)
2021–2022	→ Union SG (loan)	27	(7)

International career^{‡}
2018	Japan U21	3	(1)
2017–2021	Japan U23	9	(4)
2021–	Japan	31	(9)
Medal record
Representing Japan
Asian Games
Silver medal – second place	2018 Jakarta–Palembang	Team
- * Club domestic league appearances and goals as of 23:30, 9 May 2026 (UTC) ‡ National team caps and goals as of 03:31, 31 March 2026 (UTC)

Kaoru Mitoma (三笘 薫, Mitoma Kaoru; born 20 May 1997) is a Japanese professional footballer who plays as a left winger for Premier League club Brighton & Hove Albion and the Japan national team. He is best known for his dribbling ability and pace.

== Club career ==
=== Early years ===
Born on 20 May 1997, in Hita, Ōita, Mitoma eventually moved to Kawasaki, Kanagawa in his earlier days, where he grew up in Miyamae-ku. He then joined the Kawasaki Frontale academy at the U10 level. He was then offered a promotion from the U-18s to the senior team coached by Yahiro Kazama, but instead chose to enroll at the University of Tsukuba and join its football club, known for being a powerhouse club at university level; some of its alumni include Shogo Taniguchi and Shintaro Kurumaya. Mitoma professed to feeling unprepared to enter professional football at age 18, citing the struggles of fellow Kawasaki academy products Ko Itakura and Koji Miyoshi to win regular playing time with the senior squad. He wrote his university thesis on dribbling.

During his time at Tsukuba, Mitoma was selected to represent Japan at the 2017 and 2019 Universiade tournaments, as well as the 2018 Asian Games and the 2019 Toulon Tournament with the under-23 national team. Playing in the Kanto University Soccer League with Tsukuba, he was named to the all-league XI in his final three seasons while majoring in physical education. In addition, Tsukuba appeared in the 2016 and 2017 Emperor's Cup tournaments making an upstart run to the round of 16 in the latter edition, upsetting J.League clubs YSCC Yokohama, Vegalta Sendai (against whom Mitoma scored a brace), and Avispa Fukuoka along the way. While enrolled in college, Mitoma also occasionally joined Frontale's senior team for training sessions as a Special Designated Player starting in his second year, appearing in a single J.League Cup match in 2019.

=== Kawasaki Frontale ===
In July 2018, Mitoma agreed on a professional contract with Kawasaki Frontale, and would become a member of the team in 2020. He made his debut on the opening matchday of the 2020 J1 League and quickly established himself after the league resumed following the COVID-19 outbreak, becoming the first rookie to reach double digits in goals in the first division since Yoshinori Muto. On 1 January 2021, he scored match winning goal in a 1–0 victory against Gamba Osaka in the final of the 2020 Emperor's Cup.

=== Brighton and Hove Albion ===
==== 2021–22: Loan to Belgium ====
On 10 August 2021, Mitoma joined Premier League side Brighton & Hove Albion on a four-year deal, joining Belgian Pro League side Union SG on loan for the first year. He scored his first goal for Union SG on 16 October against Seraing, in a match where they were losing 0–2 and down to 10 men in the first half, ultimately scoring a hat-trick to end the game in a 4–2 home victory.

==== 2022–23: Breakout season ====
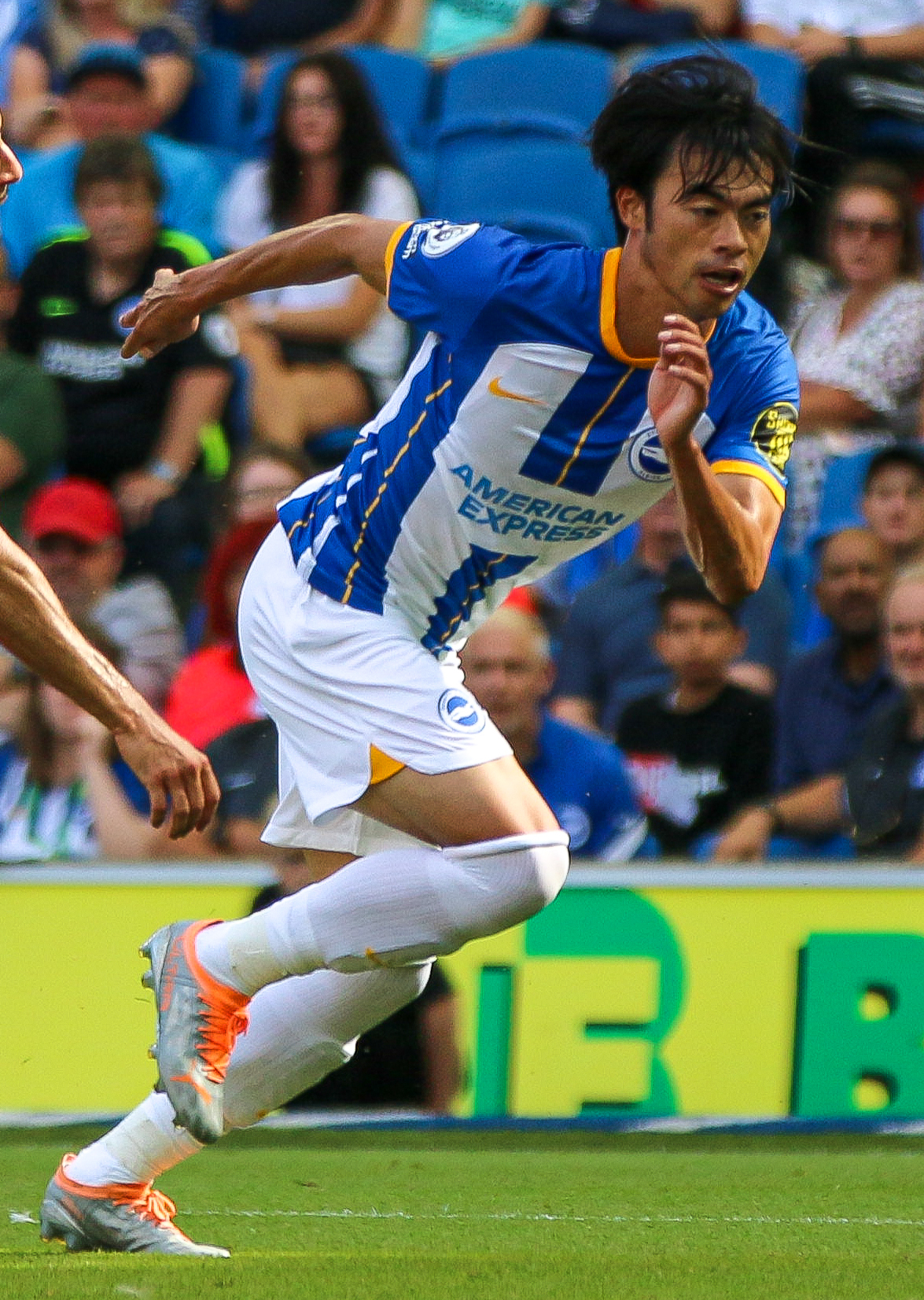
Mitoma in 2022

On 13 August 2022, Mitoma made his Premier League debut for Brighton, coming on as a 75th-minute substitute for Leandro Trossard in a goalless draw against Newcastle United at the Falmer Stadium. He made his first start for Albion on 24 August, playing 67 minutes of the 3–0 away victory against League One side Forest Green Rovers in the EFL Cup second round. He made his first Premier League start on 29 October, setting up Leandro Trossard's fifth-minute opener in the eventual 4–1 home win over Chelsea. One week later, he scored his first goal for the Seagulls, heading them level from Adam Lallana's cross in the eventual 3–2 away victory against Wolverhampton Wanderers. Mitoma also helped Brighton in both other goals with his run into the box creating Pascal Groß' 83rd-minute winner. Mitoma scored again in Brighton's next match four days later, putting Albion in front in the eventual 3–1 away victory against Arsenal in the EFL Cup third round. He scored his first home goal on 31 December, giving Brighton a lifeline in the eventual 4–2 home loss against Arsenal. He later had a goal ruled out for offside which would have cut the Gunners' lead to one.

On 29 January 2023, Mitoma's 91st-minute winner at home in the fourth round of the FA Cup saw Brighton defeat the cup holders Liverpool 2–1. On 4 February, he scored the late winning goal in a 1–0 victory over AFC Bournemouth. On 1 April, he scored his seventh league goal of the season in a 3–3 draw with Brentford to surpass Shinji Kagawa and Shinji Okazaki for the most goals scored in a single English top-flight season by a Japanese player.

==== 2023–24: Contract extension and season-ending injury ====
On 19 August 2023, Mitoma opened his season's scoring account with a sensational solo goal in Brighton's second match of the 2023–24 campaign, also setting up a Pervis Estupiñán goal in the 4–1 away league win against Wolverhampton Wanderers. Later, this goal brought him the Goal of the Month award for August, making Mitoma the first ever Japanese player to win a Premier League monthly award. On 20 October 2023, Mitoma signed a new four-year deal with Brighton & Hove Albion up to 2027. On 27 February 2024, it was announced that Mitoma would miss the rest of the 2023–24 season due to a back injury.

==== 2024–25: Return from injury and personal scoring record ====
On 17 August 2024, Mitoma marked his return from injury by opening the scoring in an eventual 3–0 away league win against Everton in Albion's first match of the 2024–25 season. Later in the season in the month of February, Mitoma would receive another Premier League Goal of the Month award from his finish in a 3–0 victory against Chelsea after receiving a long pass from goalkeeper, Bart Verbruggen. He eventually achieved his personal best goalscoring in the Premier League, concluding the season with ten league goals. Mitoma also finished as club's joint top scorer alongside João Pedro and Danny Welbeck.

==== 2025–26: Influential form and injury setback ====
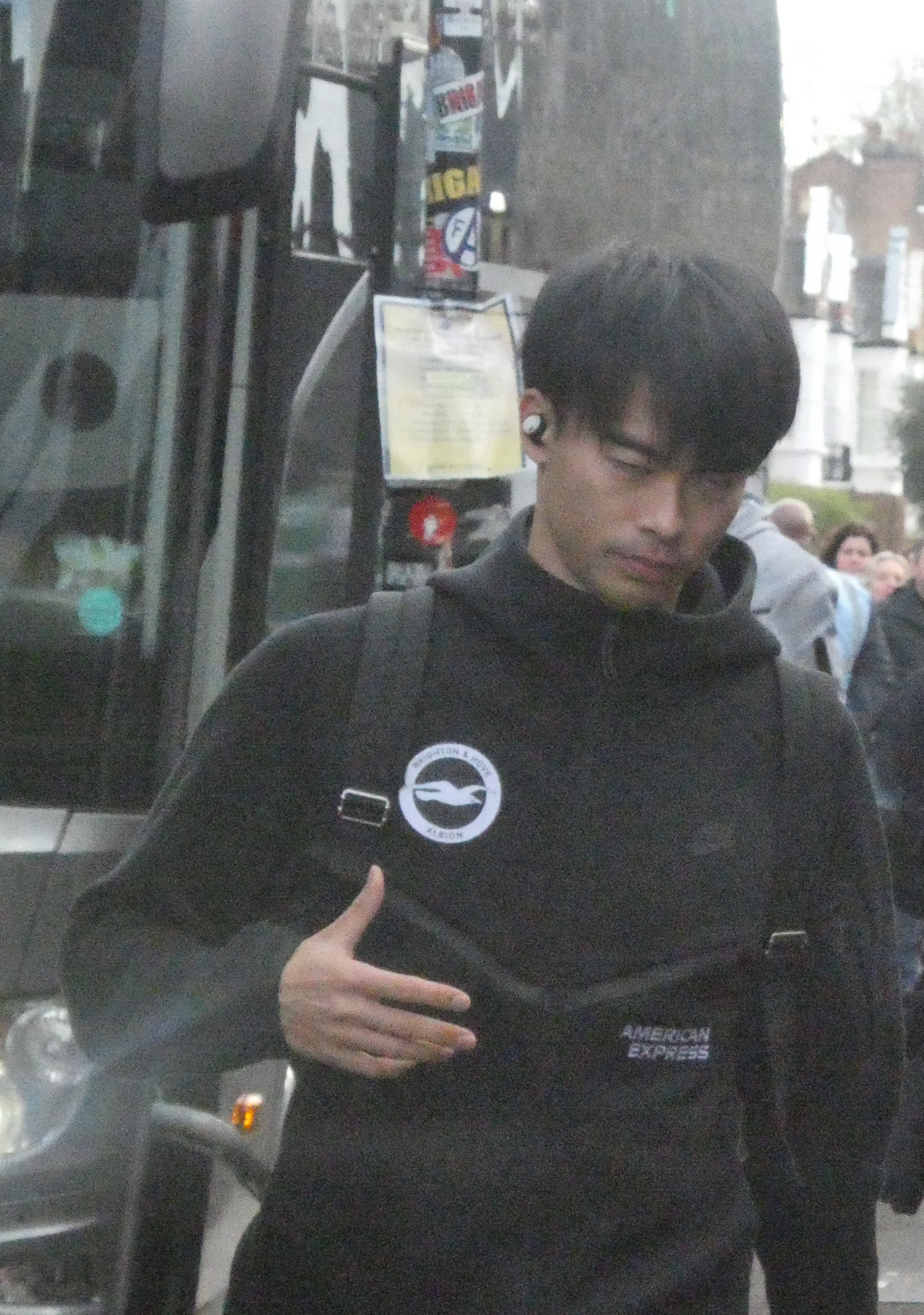
Mitoma in 2026

Mitoma had re-established himself as one of Brighton's key attacking players during the club's pursuit of European qualification, earning praise for a series of influential performances under Fabian Hürzeler. He later sustained a hamstring injury during a 3–0 win over Wolverhampton Wanderers on 9 May 2026, ruling him out for the remainder of the season and the subsequent 2026 FIFA World Cup.

== International career ==
Mitoma was part of Japan's squad for the men's football tournament at the 2020 Tokyo Olympics. He made substitute appearances against Mexico in the group stage, New Zealand in the quarter-final and Mexico again in the bronze medal match, scoring Japan's goal in the latter.

In November 2021, Mitoma was called up to the Japan senior squad for the first time for 2022 World Cup qualifiers against Oman. He made his debut on 16 November, coming on as a substitute in a 1–0 away win over Oman.

On 24 March 2022, Mitoma scored his first two international goals in a 2–0 World Cup qualification win against Australia after coming on as an 86th-minute substitute. This win confirmed Japan's qualification for the 2022 FIFA World Cup. Five days later, Mitoma made his first start for Japan in their final World Cup qualifying match against Vietnam.

In May 2022, Mitoma was included in Japan's squad for friendly matches against Paraguay and Brazil and the 2022 Kirin Cup. On 2 June, he started the match against Paraguay and scored the Samurai Blue's third goal of a 4–1 win. He also started the Kirin Cup semi-final against Ghana, where he scored once and assisted another goal for Takefusa Kubo in another 4–1 win.

On 23 September, he scored his fifth international goal from eight caps in a 2–0 friendly win against the United States after appearing as a 68th-minute substitute for Kubo. Four days later, he played 66 minutes as a starter in a 0–0 draw with Ecuador.

=== 2022 FIFA World Cup ===
On 1 November, Mitoma was named in Japan's 26-man squad for the 2022 FIFA World Cup. He made his FIFA World Cup debut in the team's opening Group E match against Germany, coming on as a 57th-minute substitute and helping the Samurai Blue to come back from a goal down to win 2–1.

In the final group match against Spain on 1 December, he came on as a half-time substitute for Yuto Nagatomo and assisted Ao Tanaka's winning goal in the 51st minute. This result saw Japan qualify to the knockout stage as group winners. The goal came with controversy, originally being ruled out for the ball going out of play. VAR took several minutes to rule a sliver of the curvature of the ball was hanging over the line and hence in play. Disputes over VAR's ruling were only settled when, after the match, the Associated Press released the bird's eye photo of the ball. The photographer Petr David Josek revealed that a total of four agencies – AP, Reuters, AFP and Getty Images — were approved to enter the suspended catwalk to take bird's eye photos, but the latter three missed the shot because they were at the opposite side of the pitch anticipating a Spanish goal instead.

On 5 December, Mitoma made his fourth substitute appearance in four World Cup matches as he came on in the 64th minute of the round of 16 fixture against Croatia. After the match finished in a 1–1 draw, he was one of three Japanese players to have their shots saved by Dominik Livaković in the penalty shootout as the Croats won 3–1.

=== 2023 AFC Asian Cup ===
On 1 January 2024, Mitoma was named in Japan's squad for the 2023 AFC Asian Cup. After missing the team's group matches through injury, Mitoma appeared as a substitute in a 3–1 round of 16 win over Bahrain. Five days later, he again came off the bench in the 2–1 quarter-final loss to Iran.

== Personal life ==
Mitoma is the childhood friend of fellow Japan international and former Kawasaki Frontale teammate Ao Tanaka, who currently plays for Premier League club Leeds United. Both went to Saginuma Elementary School in Kawasaki, Kanagawa, and promised to make Japan proud as professional footballers.

His older brother, Kousei Yuki is an actor.

== Career statistics ==
=== Club ===
As of match played 9 May 2026

Appearances and goals by club, season and competition
Club	Season	League			National cup (Note: Includes Emperor's Cup, Belgian Cup, FA Cup)		League cup (Note: Includes J.League Cup, EFL Cup)		Continental		Other		Total	
Club	Season	Division	Apps	Goals	Apps	Goals	Apps	Goals	Apps	Goals	Apps	Goals	Apps	Goals
University of Tsukuba	2016	—			1	0	—		—		—		1	0
University of Tsukuba	2017	—			4	2	—		—		—		4	2
University of Tsukuba	Total				5	2	—		—		—		5	2
Kawasaki Frontale	2019	J1 League	0	0	0	0	1	0	—		—		1	0
Kawasaki Frontale	2020	J1 League	30	13	2	2	5	3	—		—		37	18
Kawasaki Frontale	2021	J1 League	20	8	0	0	—		3 (Note: Appearances in AFC Champions League)	2	1 (Note: Appearance in Japanese Super Cup)	2	24	12
Kawasaki Frontale	Total		50	21	2	2	6	3	3	2	1	2	62	30
Union SG (loan)	2021–22	Belgian Pro League	27	7	2	1	—		—		—		29	8
Brighton & Hove Albion	2022–23	Premier League	33	7	5	2	3	1	—		—		41	10
Brighton & Hove Albion	2023–24	Premier League	19	3	0	0	1	0	6 (Note: Appearances in UEFA Europa League)	0	—		26	3
Brighton & Hove Albion	2024–25	Premier League	36	10	4	1	1	0	—		—		41	11
Brighton & Hove Albion	2025–26	Premier League	25	3	2	0	0	0	—		—		27	3
Brighton & Hove Albion	Total		113	23	11	3	5	1	6	0	—		135	27
Career total			190	51	20	8	11	4	9	2	1	2	231	67

=== International ===
As of match played 31 March 2026

Appearances and goals by national team and year
National team	Year	Apps	Goals
Japan	2021	1	0
Japan	2022	12	5
Japan	2023	5	2
Japan	2024	8	1
Japan	2025	3	0
Japan	2026	2	1
Total		31	9

As of match played 31 March 2026
Scores and results list Japan's goal tally first, score column indicates score after each Mitoma goal.

List of international goals scored by Kaoru Mitoma
No.	Date	Venue	Opponent	Score	Result	Competition
1	24 March 2022	Stadium Australia, Sydney	Australia	1–0	2–0	2022 FIFA World Cup qualification
2	24 March 2022	Stadium Australia, Sydney	Australia	2–0	2–0	2022 FIFA World Cup qualification
3	2 June 2022	Sapporo Dome, Sapporo, Japan	Paraguay	3–1	4–1	2022 Kirin Challenge Cup
4	10 June 2022	Noevir Stadium Kobe, Kobe, Japan	Ghana	2–1	4–1	2022 Kirin Cup Soccer
5	23 September 2022	Merkur Spiel-Arena, Düsseldorf, Germany	United States	2–0	2–0	Friendly
6	28 March 2023	Yodoko Sakura Stadium, Osaka, Japan	Colombia	1–0	1–2	2023 Kirin Challenge Cup
7	20 June 2023	Suita City Football Stadium, Suita, Japan	Peru	2–0	4–1	2023 Kirin Challenge Cup
8	5 September 2024	Saitama Stadium 2002, Saitama, Japan	China	2–0	7–0	2026 FIFA World Cup qualification
9	31 March 2026	Wembley Stadium, London, England	England	1–0	1–0	2026 Kirin World Challenge

== Honours ==
Kawasaki Frontale

- J1 League: 2020
- Emperor's Cup: 2020
- Japanese Super Cup: 2021

Individual

- J.League Best XI: 2020
- Japan Pro-Footballers Association Awards MVP: 2022, 2023
- Japan Pro-Footballers Association Awards Best XI: 2022, 2023, 2024
- Premier League Goal of the Month: August 2023, February 2025, April 2026
- Brighton & Hove Albion Men's Goal of the Season: 2023–24, 2024–25
- BBC Goal of the Season: 2024–25
- BBC Goal of the Month: August 2023, February 2025
- IFFHS Asian Men's Team of the Year: 2023, 2024
- The Athletic Premier League Goal of the Season: 2024–25
- EA Sports FC Premier League Team of the Season: 2024–25
