= Kōki Tachi =

Japanese footballer

Kōki Tachi 舘 幸希
Personal information
- Full name: Kōki Tachi
- Date of birth: 14 December 1997 (age 28)
- Place of birth: Suzuka, Mie, Japan
- Height: 1.73 m (5 ft 8 in)
- Position: Centre-back

Team information
- Current team: Shonan Bellmare
- Number: 4

Youth career
- 2005–2009: Granbino Reiho FC
- 2010–2012: Iga FC
- 2013–2015: Yokkaichi Chuo Kogyo High School

College career
Years	Team	Apps	(Gls)
2016–2019	Nihon University		

Senior career*
Years	Team	Apps	(Gls)
2019–	Shonan Bellmare	118	(1)
- * Club domestic league appearances and goals as of 14 August 2026

Kōki Tachi (舘 幸希, Tachi Kōki; born 14 December 1997) is a Japanese footballer currently playing as a centre-back for Shonan Bellmare.

== Career statistics ==
=== Club ===
As of 6 August 2022

Club	Season	League			National Cup		League Cup		Continental		Other		Total	
Club	Season	Division	Apps	Goals	Apps	Goals	Apps	Goals	Apps	Goals	Apps	Goals	Apps	Goals
Shonan Bellmare	2019	J1 League	0	0	0	0	0	0	0	0	0	0	0	0
Shonan Bellmare	2020	J1 League	17	0	0	0	3 (Note: Appearances in the J. League Cup)	0	0	0	0	0	20	0
Shonan Bellmare	2021	J1 League	29	0	2 (Note: Appearances in the Emperor's Cup)	0	4	0	0	0	0	0	35	0
Shonan Bellmare	2022	J1 League	16	0	2 (Note: Appearances in the Emperor's Cup)	0	3	0	0	0	0	0	21	0
Career total			62	0	4	0	10	0	0	0	0	0	76	0
