= Daiya Tōno =

Japanese footballer (born 1999)

Daiya Tōno 遠野 大弥
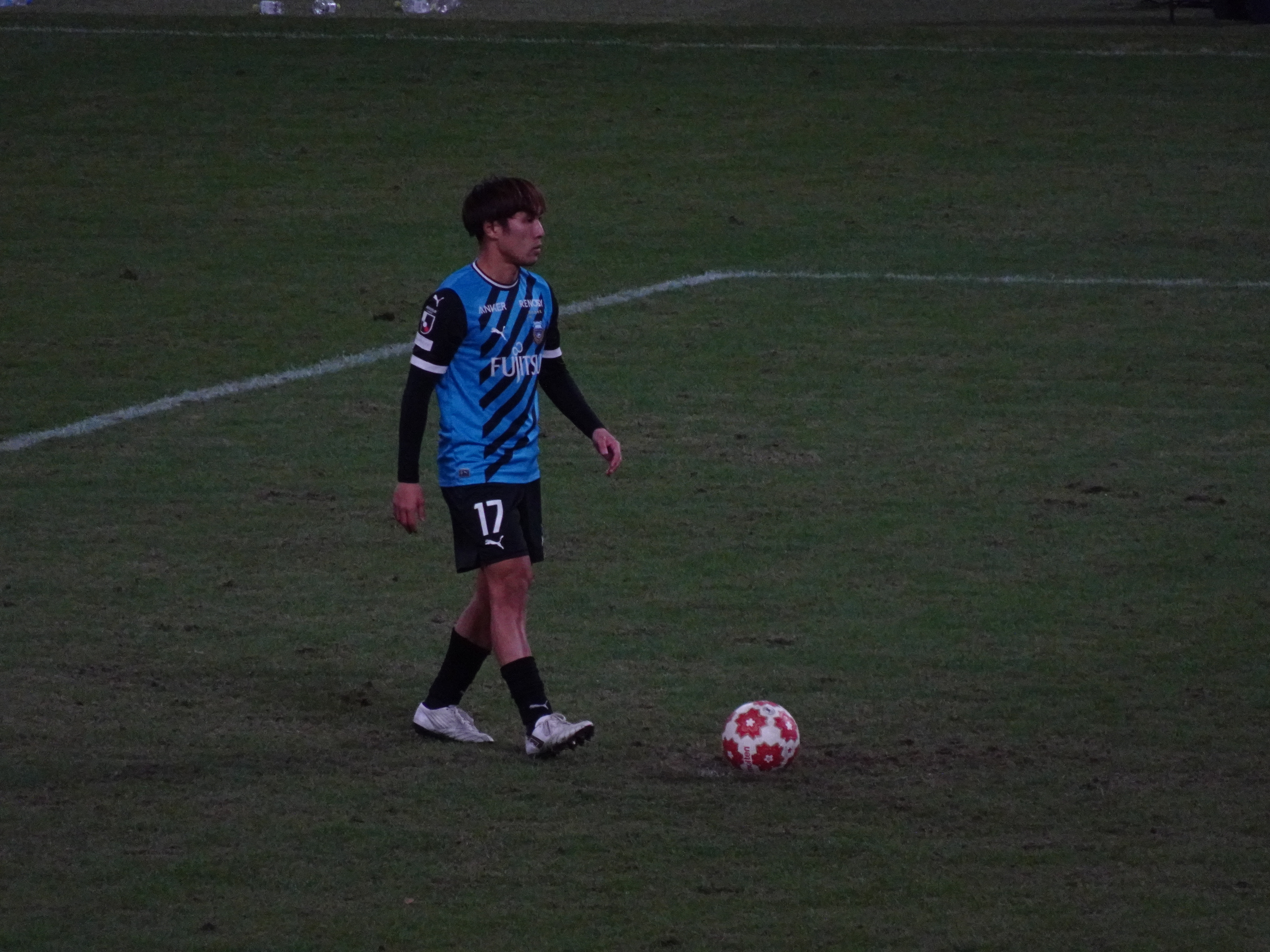

Personal information
- Date of birth: 14 March 1999 (age 27)
- Place of birth: Fujieda, Shizuoka, Japan
- Height: 1.66 m (5 ft 5 in)
- Positions: Forward; winger

Team information
- Current team: Yokohama F. Marinos
- Number: 7

Youth career
- Nishimashizu SSS
- 2011–2013: Fujieda Meisei SC
- 2014–2016: Fujieda Meisei High School

Senior career*
| Years | Team | Apps | (Gls) |
| 2017–2019 | Honda FC | 62 | (18) |
| 2020–2024 | Kawasaki Frontale | 123 | (10) |
| 2020 | → Avispa Fukuoka (loan) | 41 | (11) |
| 2025– | Yokohama F. Marinos | 28 | (8) |
- * Club domestic league appearances and goals as of 11 August 2026

Daiya Tōno (遠野 大弥, Tōno Daiya; born 14 March 1999) is a Japanese footballer currently playing as a forward or a winger for J1 League club Yokohama F. Marinos.

== Career ==
After three good seasons with Honda FC in JFL, Kawasaki Frontale opted to sign Tōno for 2020 season.

The club decided to loan him to Avispa Fukuoka in J2 League.

== Career statistics ==
=== Club ===
As of 27 February 2025.

Appearances and goals by club, season and competition
| Club | Season | League | | | National Cup | | League Cup | | Continental | | Other | | Total | |
| Club | Season | Division | Apps | Goals | Apps | Goals | Apps | Goals | Apps | Goals | Apps | Goals | Apps | Goals |
| Japan | | | League | | Emperor's Cup | | J.League Cup | | AFC | | Other | | Total | |
|---|---|---|---|---|---|---|---|---|---|---|---|---|---|---|
| Honda FC | 2017 | JFL | 16 | 4 | 1 | 1 | – | | – | | 0 | 0 | 17 | 5 |
| Honda FC | 2018 | JFL | 20 | 5 | 2 | 0 | – | | – | | 0 | 0 | 22 | 5 |
| Honda FC | 2019 | JFL | 26 | 9 | 5 | 4 | – | | – | | 0 | 0 | 31 | 13 |
| Honda FC | Total | | 62 | 18 | 8 | 5 | 0 | 0 | 0 | 0 | 0 | 0 | 70 | 23 |
| Kawasaki Frontale | 2021 | J1 League | 27 | 6 | 4 | 0 | 2 | 0 | 4 | 1 | 1 (Note: Appearances in the Japanese Super Cup) | 0 | 38 | 7 |
| Kawasaki Frontale | 2022 | J1 League | 31 | 2 | 2 | 0 | 2 | 0 | 5 | 0 | 0 | 0 | 40 | 2 |
| Kawasaki Frontale | 2023 | J1 League | 30 | 1 | 5 | 2 | 6 | 3 | 4 | 2 | 0 | 0 | 45 | 8 |
| Kawasaki Frontale | 2024 | J1 League | 35 | 1 | 2 | 0 | 4 | 2 | 6 | 1 | 0 | 0 | 47 | 4 |
| Kawasaki Frontale | Total | | 123 | 10 | 13 | 2 | 14 | 5 | 19 | 4 | 1 | 0 | 170 | 21 |
| Avispa Fukuoka (loan) | 2020 | J2 League | 41 | 11 | 0 | 0 | 0 | 0 | – | | 0 | 0 | 41 | 11 |
| Yokohama F. Marinos | 2025 | J1 League | 3 | 0 | 0 | 0 | 0 | 0 | 0 | 0 | 0 | 0 | 3 | 0 |
| Career total | | | 229 | 39 | 21 | 7 | 14 | 5 | 19 | 4 | 1 | 0 | 284 | 55 |

== Honours ==
=== Club ===
Kawasaki Frontale

- J1 League: 2021
- Emperor's Cup: 2023
- Japanese Super Cup: 2021
