= Kazuki Kozuka =

Japanese footballer (born 1994)

Kazuki Kozuka 小塚和季
Personal information
- Date of birth: 2 August 1994 (age 32)
- Place of birth: Mitsuke, Niigata, Japan
- Height: 1.73 m (5 ft 8 in)
- Position: Attacking midfielder

Team information
- Current team: Shimizu S-Pulse
- Number: 81

Youth career
- 2010–2012: Teikyo Nagaoka High School

Senior career*
Years	Team	Apps	(Gls)
2013–2017	Albirex Niigata	8	(0)
2014	→ J.League U-22	1	(0)
2014–2015	→ Renofa Yamaguchi (loan)	46	(8)
2017	→ Renofa Yamaguchi (loan)	39	(8)
2018	Ventforet Kofu	31	(6)
2019–2021	Oita Trinita	41	(2)
2021–2023	Kawasaki Frontale	22	(0)
2023–2024	Suwon Samsung Bluewings	27	(1)
2024	Seoul E-Land FC	19	(1)
2025–	Shimizu S-Pulse	34	(3)

International career^{‡}
2012	Japan U-18	2	(0)
- * Club domestic league appearances and goals as of 10 August 2026 ‡ National team caps and goals as of 01:43, 26 November 2015 (UTC)

Kazuki Kozuka (小塚 和季, Kozuka Kazuki; born 2 August 1994) is a Japanese footballer who plays for Shimizu S-Pulse as an attacking midfielder.

== Club career ==
Kozuka was born in Mitsuke, Niigata. He played junior football for Mitsuke FC and Nagaoka Junior Youth FC in the Hokushin'etsu Youth League while attending Mitsuke Minami Junior High School, before being offered a spot at Teikyo Nagaoka High School on a football scholarship.

Kozuka joined Albirex Niigata as an apprentice professional in 2012. He turned full-time professional with Albirex at the start of the 2013 season and made his first-team debut against Tokushima Vortis in the first round of the Nabisco Cup. His first J. League appearance was in the 2–1 away win over Tokushima Vortis on 26 April 2014.

On 8 July 2014, Kozuka joined Japan Football League side Renofa Yamaguchi on loan until December. He scored his first goal for Rnofa against Sony Sendai on 2 August. He became regular for Renofa, creating a strong attacking partnership with Kazuhito Kishida. Kozuka impressed at Renofa, and his loan deal was eventually extended to the end of the 2015 season. On 6 April 2015, in the 3–0 league victory at Fujieda, Kozuka scored a 60-yard goal from the halfway line.

On 21 June 2024, he was traded with Peter Makrillos and moved to Seoul E-Land FC.

== International career ==
In April 2012, he was selected in Japan under 18 squad for the TIPOS Slovakia Cup against Norway.

== Career statistics ==
As of 7 December 2019.

Club	Season	League			Emperor's Cup		J.League Cup		Total	
Club	Season	Division	Apps	Goals	Apps	Goals	Apps	Goals	Apps	Goals
Albirex Niigata	2013	J1 League	0	0	0	0	0	0	0	0
Albirex Niigata	2014	J1 League	2	0	—		1	0	0	0
Renofa Yamaguchi	2014	JFL	13	2	—		—		13	2
Renofa Yamaguchi	2015	J3 League	33	6	0	0	—		33	6
Albirex Niigata	2016	J1 League	6	0	2	0	5	1	13	1
Renofa Yamaguchi	2017	J2 League	39	8	0	0	—		39	8
Ventforet Kofu	2018	J2 League	31	6	0	0	3	2	34	8
Oita Trinita	2019	J1 League	33	1	2	0	1	0	36	1
Career total			157	23	4	0	10	3	171	26

== Honours ==
Kawasaki Frontale

- J1 League: 2021
