= Koki Harada =

Japanese footballer

Personal information
- Date of birth: 6 August 2000 (age 26)
- Place of birth: Saitama Prefecture, Japan
- Height: 1.69 m (5 ft 7 in)
- Position: Midfielder

Team information
- Current team: ReinMeer Aomori

Youth career
- 2016–2018: Shohei High School

Senior career*
Years	Team	Apps	(Gls)
2019–2023	Kawasaki Frontale	0	(0)
2021	→ Gainare Tottori (loan)	16	(0)
2022–2023	→ Nagano Parceiro (loan)	25	(1)
2024–	ReinMeer Aomori		
- * Club domestic league appearances and goals as of 17:49, 1 August 2024 (UTC)

Koki Harada (born 6 August 2000) is a Japanese professional footballer who plays as a midfielder for ReinMeer Aomori.

== Career ==
Born in Saitama Prefecture, Harada began playing with Shohei High School, before signing for Kawasaki Frontale in 2019. After loan spells with Gainare Tottori and Nagano Parceiro, he left Frontale at the end of the 2023 season. He signed with ReinMeer Aomori in February 2024.
