= Kaito Kamiya =

Japanese footballer

Kaito Kamiya 神谷 凱士
Personal information
- Date of birth: 16 June 1997 (age 29)
- Place of birth: Nishio, Aichi, Japan
- Height: 1.83 m (6 ft 0 in)
- Position: Defender

Team information
- Current team: FC Ryukyu
- Number: 22

Youth career
- FC Nishio
- –2012: Roupeiro Kariya
- 2013–2015: Tokai Gakuen High School

College career
| Years | Team | Apps | (Gls) |
| 2016–2019 | Tokai Gakuen University | | |

Senior career*
| Years | Team | Apps | (Gls) |
| 2020–2023 | Kawasaki Frontale | 1 | (0) |
| 2021–2022 | → Fujieda MYFC (loan) | 22 | (1) |
| 2023 | → Ventforet Kofu (loan) | 2 | (0) |
| 2024 | Ventforet Kofu | 7 | (1) |
| 2025- | FC Ryukyu | 23 | (1) |
- * Club domestic league appearances and goals as of 25 August 2026

Kaito Kamiya (神谷 凱士, Kamiya Kaito; born 16 June 1997) is a Japanese footballer who plays as a defender for J3 League club FC Ryukyu. He is the twin brother of fellow professional footballer Ryoto Kamiya.

== Career ==
On 12 January 2022, Kaito Kamiya loaned to Fujieda MYFC for 2022 season.

On 13 December at same year, Kaito Kamiya loaned again to Ventforet Kofu for upcoming 2023 season.

== Career statistics ==
=== Club ===
As of 24 February 2023.

| Club | Season | League | | | National Cup | | League Cup | | Continental | | Other | | Total | |
| Club | Season | Division | Apps | Goals | Apps | Goals | Apps | Goals | Apps | Goals | Apps | Goals | Apps | Goals |
|---|---|---|---|---|---|---|---|---|---|---|---|---|---|---|
| Kawasaki Frontale | 2020 | J1 League | 0 | 0 | 0 | 0 | 0 | 0 | – | | 0 | 0 | 0 | 0 |
| Kawasaki Frontale | 2021 | J1 League | 1 | 0 | 0 | 0 | 0 | 0 | 0 | 0 | 0 | 0 | 1 | 0 |
| Fujieda MYFC (loan) | 2022 | J3 League | 22 | 1 | 1 | 0 | 0 | 0 | – | | 0 | 0 | 23 | 1 |
| Ventforet Kofu (loan) | 2023 | J2 League | 0 | 0 | 0 | 0 | 0 | 0 | – | | 0 | 0 | 0 | 0 |
| Career total | | | 23 | 1 | 1 | 0 | 0 | 0 | 0 | 0 | 0 | 0 | 24 | 1 |

== Honours ==
=== Kawasaki Frontale ===
- J1 League: 2020, 2021
- Emperor's Cup: 2020
- Japanese Super Cup: 2021
