= Ten Miyagi =

Japanese footballer (born 2001)

Ten Miyagi 宮城 天
Personal information
- Full name: Ten Miyagi
- Date of birth: 2 June 2001 (age 25)
- Place of birth: Nakahara-ku, Kawasaki, Kanagawa, Japan
- Height: 1.77 m (5 ft 10 in)
- Position: Winger

Team information
- Current team: Kawasaki Frontale
- Number: 24

Youth career
- 2008–2010: Tachibana SC
- 2011–2020: Kawasaki Frontale

Senior career*
Years	Team	Apps	(Gls)
2020–	Kawasaki Frontale	69	(7)
2020	→ Kataller Toyama (loan)	20	(3)
2023	→ V-Varen Nagasaki (loan)	13	(3)
2023	→ Montedio Yamagata (loan)	7	(3)

International career^{‡}
2017	Japan U16	1	(1)
2018	Japan U17		
- * Club domestic league appearances and goals as of 1 August 2026 ‡ National team caps and goals as of 17:04, 17 July 2020 (UTC)

Ten Miyagi (宮城 天, Miyagi Ten; born 2 June 2001) is a Japanese footballer who plays as a winger for J1 League club Kawasaki Frontale.

== Early life ==
Ten was born in Kawasaki. He was born to a Burmese father and a Japanese mother. He played youth football for Tachibana SC and Kawasaki Frontale.

== Career ==
Ten made his debut for V-Varen against JEF United on the 18th February 2023, coming on in the 61st minute for Caio César. He scored his first goals for V-Varen against Roasso Kumamoto on the 19th March 2023, scoring a brace in a 2-0 win.

Ten made his debut for Montedio against Oita Trinita on the 27th of July 2023, coming off in the 67th minute for Yusuke Goto. Ten scored his first goal for Montedio against Fujieda MYFC, scoring in the 3rd minute on the 5th August 2023.

== International career ==
Ten has youth caps for the Japan national team. He scored on his debut for the Japan U16s.

== Career statistics ==
=== Club ===
As of 22 July 2022.

Club	Season	League			National Cup		League Cup		Continental		Other		Total	
Club	Season	Division	Apps	Goals	Apps	Goals	Apps	Goals	Apps	Goals	Apps	Goals	Apps	Goals
Kawasaki Frontale	2020	J1 League	0	0	0	0	0	0	–		–		0	0
Kawasaki Frontale	2021	J1 League	14	2	0	0	2	0	1	1	–		17	3
Kawasaki Frontale	2022	J1 League	20	1	1	0	1	0	6	1	–		28	3
Kawasaki Frontale	Total		34	3	1	0	3	0	7	2	0	0	45	6
Kataller Toyama (loan)	2020	J3 League	20	3	0	0	–		–		–		20	3
V-Varen Nagasaki (loan)	2023	J2 League	0	0	0	0	–		–		–		0	0
Career total			54	6	1	0	3	0	7	2	0	0	65	9

== Honours ==
=== Club ===
- J1 League: 2021
