= 2020 FC Tokyo season =

FC Tokyo 2020 football season

FC Tokyo
2020 season
- Chairman: Naoki Ogane
- Head: Kenta Hasegawa
- Stadium: Ajinomoto Stadium
- J1 League: 5th
- J. League Cup: Champions
- Top goalscorer: League: Diego Oliveira (9 goals); All: Diego Oliveira (13 goals)
Home colours	Away colours

The 2020 FC Tokyo season was their 9th consecutive season in J1 League after finishing the 2019 season in 2nd place. They also competed in the J.League Cup.

== Squad ==
As of 10 January 2020

Note: Flags indicate national team as defined under FIFA eligibility rules; some limited exceptions apply. Players may hold more than one non-FIFA nationality.

No.	Pos.	Nation	Player
1	GK	JPN	Tsuyoshi Kodama
2	DF	JPN	Sei Muroya
3	DF	JPN	Masato Morishige
4	DF	JPN	Tsuyoshi Watanabe
5	DF	JPN	Daiki Niwa
6	DF	JPN	Ryoya Ogawa
7	MF	JPN	Hirotaka Mita
8	MF	JPN	Yojiro Takahagi
9	FW	BRA	Diego Oliveira
10	MF	JPN	Keigo Higashi (captain)
11	FW	JPN	Kensuke Nagai
13	GK	JPN	Go Hatano
15	FW	JPN	Takefusa Kubo
15	MF	BRA	Adaílton
17	FW	KOR	Na Sang-ho
18	MF	JPN	Kento Hashimoto
19	MF	JPN	Kiwara Miyazaki

No.	Pos.	Nation	Player
20	MF	BRA	Leandro
22	DF	JPN	Takumi Nakamura
23	FW	JPN	Kiichi Yajima
24	FW	JPN	Taichi Hara
27	FW	JPN	Kyosuke Tagawa
28	MF	JPN	Takuya Uchida
31	MF	JPN	Shuto Abe
33	GK	JPN	Akihiro Hayashi
35	MF	JPN	Yoshitake Suzuki
36	DF	JPN	Takahiro Yanagi
37	DF	JPN	Hotaka Nakamura
38	MF	JPN	Kazuya Konno
40	MF	JPN	Rei Hirakawa
41	GK	JPN	Taishi Brandon Nozawa
44	MF	JPN	Manato Shinada
45	MF	BRA	Arthur Silva
49	DF	JPN	Kashifu Bangunagande
–	DF	LBN	Joan Oumari

== Competitions ==
=== J1 League ===
==== League table ====
Pos	Team	Pld	W	D	L	GF	GA	GD	Pts	Qualification or relegation
4	Cerezo Osaka	34	18	6	10	46	37	+9	60	Qualification for AFC Champions League play-off round (Note: Since the winners of the 2020 Emperor's Cup, Kawasaki Frontale, qualified for the Champions League group stage, the spot given to the Emperor's Cup winners (Champions League group stage) was passed to the third-placed team and the spot given to the third-place team (Champions League play-off round) was passed to the fourth-placed team.)
5	Kashima Antlers	34	18	5	11	55	44	+11	59	
6	FC Tokyo	34	17	6	11	47	42	+5	57	
7	Kashiwa Reysol	34	15	7	12	60	46	+14	52	
8	Sanfrecce Hiroshima	34	13	9	12	46	37	+9	48	

Source: Meiji Yasuda J1 League
Rules for classification: 1) Points; 2) Goal difference; 3) Head-to-head points; 4) Head-to-head goal difference; 5) Head-to-head goal scored; 6) Number of wins; 7) Goals scored; 8) Fair-play points.

==== Matches ====
23 February 2020 1	Shimizu S-Pulse	1 – 3	FC Tokyo	Shizuoka
	Dangda 47'	Report	Diego Oliveira 77' (pen.); Adaílton 79'; Leonardo 90+2' (pen.)	Stadium: IAI Stadium Nihondaira

=== J. League Cup ===
==== Finals ====
4 January 2021	Kashiwa Reysol	1–2	FC Tokyo	Tokyo
14:41 JST	Segawa 45'	Report	Leandro 16'; Adaílton 74'	Stadium: National Stadium; Attendance: 24,219; Referee: Koichiro Fukushima
