= 2019 FC Tokyo season =

FC Tokyo
2019 season
- Chairman: Naoki Ogane
- Manager: Kenta Hasegawa
- Stadium: Ajinomoto Stadium
- J1 League: 2nd
- Emperor's Cup: Third round
- J. League Cup: Quarter-finals
- Top goalscorer: League: Diego Oliveira (14); All: Diego Oliveira (16)
- Average home league attendance: 31,540
Home colours	Away colours

The 2019 FC Tokyo season was their 8th consecutive season in J1 League after finishing the 2018 season in 6th place. They also competed in the J.League Cup and Emperor's Cup.

== Squad ==
As of 16 February 2019. Note: Flags indicate national team as defined under FIFA eligibility rules; some limited exceptions apply. Players may hold more than one non-FIFA nationality.

No.	Pos.	Nation	Player
1	GK	JPN	Tsuyoshi Kodama
2	DF	JPN	Sei Muroya
3	DF	JPN	Masato Morishige
5	DF	JPN	Daiki Niwa
6	DF	JPN	Kosuke Ota
8	MF	JPN	Yojiro Takahagi
9	FW	BRA	Diego Oliveira
10	MF	JPN	Keigo Higashi (captain)
11	FW	JPN	Kensuke Nagai
13	GK	JPN	Go Hatano
15	FW	JPN	Takefusa Kubo
16	FW	BRA	Jael
17	FW	KOR	Na Sang-ho
18	MF	JPN	Kento Hashimoto
19	MF	JPN	Kiwara Miyazaki
20	DF	KOR	Jang Hyun-Soo
21	MF	KOR	Yu In-soo

No.	Pos.	Nation	Player
22	DF	JPN	Takumi Nakamura
23	FW	JPN	Kiichi Yajima
24	FW	JPN	Taichi Hara
25	DF	JPN	Ryoya Ogawa
27	FW	JPN	Kyosuke Tagawa
28	MF	JPN	Takuya Uchida
29	DF	JPN	Makoto Okazaki
31	FW	THA	Nattawut Suksum (on loan from Bangkok United)
32	DF	JPN	Tsuyoshi Watanabe
33	GK	JPN	Akihiro Hayashi
35	MF	JPN	Yoshitake Suzuki
39	MF	JPN	Kotaro Omori
40	MF	JPN	Rei Hirakawa
44	MF	JPN	Manato Shinada
45	MF	BRA	Arthur Silva (on loan from CA Votuporanguense)

== Competitions ==
=== J1 League ===
==== League table ====
Pos	Team	Pld	W	D	L	GF	GA	GD	Pts	Qualification or relegation
1	Yokohama F. Marinos (C)	34	22	4	8	68	38	+30	70	Qualification for the Champions League group stage
2	FC Tokyo	34	19	7	8	46	29	+17	64	Qualification for the Champions League play-off round
3	Kashima Antlers	34	18	9	7	54	30	+24	63	Qualification for the Champions League play-off round
4	Kawasaki Frontale	34	16	12	6	57	34	+23	60	
5	Cerezo Osaka	34	18	5	11	39	25	+14	59	

Source: Meiji Yasuda J1 League
Rules for classification: 1) Points; 2) Goal difference; 3) Goals scored.
(C) Champions

==== Matches ====
23 February 2019 1	Kawasaki Frontale	0 – 0	FC Tokyo	Kawasaki
14:03 JST	Kurumaya (yellow card) 32'; Nakamura (yellow card) 66'; Nara (yellow card) 79'	Report	Takahagi (yellow card) 83'; Na (yellow card) 90+1'	Stadium: Kawasaki Todoroki Stadium; Attendance: 23,113; Referee: Nobutsugu Murakami

2 March 2019 2	Shonan Bellmare	2 – 3	FC Tokyo	Hiratsuka
16:03 JST	Saito (yellow card) 3'; Takahagi 17' (o.g.); Sugioka (yellow card) 43'; Taketomi 53'; Ibusuki (yellow card) 90'	Report	Higashi 27'; Hashimoto 40'; Diego 50' (pen.); Na (yellow card) 77'	Stadium: Shonan BMW Stadium Hiratsuka; Attendance: 12,878; Referee: Hiroyoshi Takayama

10 March 2019 3	FC Tokyo	2 – 0	Sagan Tosu	Chōfu
14:03 JST	Muroya (yellow card) 83'; Mitsumaru 88' (o.g.); Jael 90+3'	Report	Takahashi (yellow card) 57' (yellow-red card) 61'; Torres (yellow card) 67'	Stadium: Ajinomoto Stadium; Attendance: 27,937; Referee: Minoru Tojo

17 March 2019 4	FC Tokyo	1 – 0	Nagoya Grampus	Chōfu
13:33 JST	Nagai 54'	Report	Yonemoto (yellow card) 45+2'; Maruyama (yellow card) 69'	Stadium: Ajinomoto Stadium; Attendance: 25,656; Referee: Masaaki Iemoto Toma

30 March 2019 5	Urawa Red Diamonds	1 – 1	FC Tokyo	Saitama
14:04 JST	Moriwaki 90+4'	Report	Takahagi (yellow card) 69'; Diego Oliveira 75' (yellow card) 76'	Stadium: Saitama Stadium 2002; Attendance: 39,055; Referee: Hiroyuki Kimura

6 April 2019 6	FC Tokyo	2–1	Shimizu S-Pulse	Chōfu
15:00 JST	Muroya (yellow card) 53'; Na Sang-ho 75'; Diego Oliveira 86'	Summary	Kitagawa 46'; Matsubara (yellow card) 63'	Stadium: Ajinomoto Stadium; Attendance: 22,302; Referee: Hajime Matsuo

14 April 2019 7	FC Tokyo	3–1	Kashima Antlers	Chōfu
15:00 JST	Nagai 5'; Diego Oliveira 16' 29'	Summary	Léo Silva 55'	Stadium: Ajinomoto Stadium; Attendance: 38,414; Referee: Ryuji Sato

19 April 2019 8	Sanfrecce Hiroshima	0–1	FC Tokyo	Hiroshima
20:00 JST	Nogami (yellow card) 74'	Summary	Diego Oliveira 71'	Stadium: Edion Stadium Hiroshima; Attendance: 15,827; Referee: Nobutsugu Murakami

28 April 2019 9	FC Tokyo	2–0	Matsumoto Yamaga	Chōfu
15:00 JST	Nagai 44'; Takahagi (yellow card) 62'; Diego Oliveira 77' (pen.)	Summary	Tanaka (yellow card) 31'; Leandro Pereira (yellow card) 53'; Sugimoto (yellow card) 82'	Stadium: Ajinomoto Stadium; Attendance: 36,412; Referee: Minoru Tōjō

4 May 2019 10	Gamba Osaka	0–0	FC Tokyo	Suita
17:00 JST	Oh Jae-suk (yellow card) 37'; Ko (yellow card) 45'; Suganuma (yellow card) 76'; Kim Young-gwon (yellow card) 90+1'	Summary	Takahagi (yellow card) 50'; Hashimoto (yellow card) 50'	Stadium: Panasonic Stadium Suita; Attendance: 33,905; Referee: Masaaki Iemoto Toma

12 May 2019 11	FC Tokyo	1–0	Júbilo Iwata	Chōfu
15:00 JST	Kubo 84'	Report	Shinzato (yellow card) 66'	Stadium: Ajinomoto Stadium; Attendance: 31,075; Referee: Nobutsugu Murakami

18 May 2019 12	FC Tokyo	2–0	Consadole Sapporo	Chōfu
15:00 JST	Ogawa (yellow card) 13' (goal) 59'; Kubo 69'	Report	Fukumori (yellow card) 7'	Stadium: Ajinomoto Stadium; Attendance: 24,772; Referee: Hirokazu Otsubo

25 May 2019 13	Cerezo Osaka	1–0	FC Tokyo	Osaka
16:00 JST	Mizunuma (yellow card) 42'; Desábato (yellow card) 45+2'; Bruno Mendes 78'; Fujita (yellow card) 90+5'	Report		Stadium: Yanmar Stadium Nagai; Attendance: 24,624; Referee: Akihiko Ikeuchi

1 June 2019 14	FC Tokyo	3 – 1	Oita Trinita	Chōfu
14:00 JST	Hashimoto 30'; Kubo 39' 90+1'; Higashi (yellow card) 45+1'	Report	Shimakawa (yellow card) 50'; Onaiwu 59'; Puangchan (yellow card) 67'	Stadium: Ajinomoto Stadium; Attendance: 25,175; Referee: (Japan) Jumpei Iida

15 June 2019 15	FC Tokyo	0 – 1	Vissel Kobe	Chōfu
19:00 JST		Report	Iniesta 49'	Stadium: Ajinomoto Stadium; Attendance: 38,506; Referee: (Japan) Massaki Iemoto

23 June 2019 16	Vegalta Sendai	2 – 0	FC Tokyo	Sendai
19:00 JST	Simão Mate (yellow card) 45+5'; Sekiguchi 74'; Ramon Lopes 88'	Report	Takahagi (yellow card) 31'	Stadium: Yurtec Stadium Sendai; Attendance: 12,343; Referee: (Japan) Hajime Matsuo

29 June 2019 17	FC Tokyo	4 – 2	Yokohama F. Marinos	Chōfu
19:00 JST	Na Sang-ho 17'; Nagai 38'; Diego Oliveira 55' 62'; Arthur (yellow card) 85'	Report	Marcos Júnior 15'; Hatanaka (yellow card) 19'; Hayashi 83' (o.g.)	Stadium: Ajinomoto Stadium; Attendance: 33,705; Referee: (Japan) Yusuke Araki

7 July 2019 18	FC Tokyo	3 – 1	Gamba Osaka	Chōfu
19:00 JST	Nagai 37' 40'; Diego Oliveira 60'	Report	Onose 5'; Takao (yellow card) 90'	Stadium: Ajinomoto Stadium; Attendance: 28,209; Referee: (Japan) Hiroyuki Kimura

14 July 2019 19	FC Tokyo	0 – 3	Kawasaki Frontale	Chōfu
19:00 JST		Report	Kobayashi 20'; Kurumaya (yellow card) 40'; Abe (yellow card) 44' (goal) 69'; Saitō 54'	Stadium: Ajinomoto Stadium; Attendance: 42,401; Referee: (Japan) Ryuji Sato

20 July 2019 20	Shimizu S-Pulse	0 – 2	FC Tokyo	Shizuoka
19:00 JST	Takeuchi (yellow card) 56'	Report	Omori 16'; Nagai 30'	Stadium: IAI Stadium Nihondaira; Attendance: 15,750; Referee: (Japan) Hiroyoshi Takayama

3 August 2019 21	FC Tokyo	3 – 0	Cerezo Osaka	Chōfu
19:00 JST	Nagai 47'; Morishige (yellow card) 61' (goal) 68'; Diego Oliveira 90+2'	Report		Stadium: Ajinomoto Stadium; Attendance: 28,721; Referee: (Japan) Jumpei Iida

10 August 2019 22	FC Tokyo	1 – 0	Vegalta Sendai	Chōfu
19:00 JST	Diego Oliveira 62' (pen.)	Report	Słowik (yellow card) 61'; Nakahara (yellow card) 80'; Ramon Lopes (yellow card) 88'; Nagasawa (yellow card) 90+1'	Stadium: Ajinomoto Stadium; Attendance: 28,435; Referee: (Japan) Nobutsugu Murakami

17 August 2019 23	FC Tokyo	0 – 1	Sanfrecce Hiroshima	Chōfu
19:00 JST	Diego Oliveira (yellow card) 45+1'; Higashi (yellow card) 70'; Jael (yellow card) 73'	Report	Kashiwa 61'	Stadium: Ajinomoto Stadium; Attendance: 30,015; Referee: (Japan) Minoru Tōjō

24 August 2019 24	Hokkaido Consadole Sapporo	1 – 1	FC Tokyo	Sapporo
13:00 JST	Bothroyd 47'; Fukai (yellow card) 79'	Report	Watanabe 37'; Morishige (yellow card) 85'	Stadium: Sapporo Dome; Attendance: 19,454; Referee: (Japan) Hajime Matsuo

30 August 2019 25	Nagoya Grampus	1 – 2	FC Tokyo	Nagoya
19:30 JST	Maruyama (yellow card) 39'; Akasaki (yellow card) 77'; Maeda 83'; Nakatani (yellow card) 87'	Report	Diego Oliveira 29' (yellow card) 88'; Takahagi 49'; Oh Jae-suk (yellow card) 71'	Stadium: Paloma Mizuho Stadium; Attendance: 20,188; Referee: (Japan) Hiroyuki Kimura

14 September 2019 26	Kashima Antlers	2 – 0	FC Tokyo	Kashima
19:00 JST	Bueno 2'; Misao (yellow card) 28'; Serginho 78'	Report	Muroya (yellow card) 57'	Stadium: Kashima Soccer Stadium; Attendance: 27,285; Referee: (Japan) Minoru Tōjō

29 September 2019 27	Matsumoto Yamaga	0 – 0	FC Tokyo	Matsumoto
14:00 JST	Iida (yellow card) 83'	Report	Oh Jae-suk (yellow card) 88'	Stadium: Sunpro Alwin; Attendance: 19,271; Referee: (Japan) Jumpei Iida

5 October 2019 28	Sagan Tosu	2 – 1	FC Tokyo	Tosu
14:00 JST	Toyoda 86'; Takashi Kanai 90+5'	Report	Hirotaka Mita 48'	Stadium: Ekimae Real Estate Stadium; Attendance: 11,616; Referee: (Japan) Ryuji Sato

19 October 2019 29	Vissel Kobe	1 – 3	FC Tokyo	Kobe
13:00 JST	Sergi Samper (yellow card) 23'; Joan Oumari 66'	Report	Takahagi 6'; Arthur Silva 10'; Hashimoto 34'	Stadium: Noevir Stadium Kobe; Attendance: 20,413; Referee: (Japan) Yusuke Araki

2 November 2019 30	Oita Trinita	0 – 2	FC Tokyo	Ōita
14:00 JST		Report	Nagai 5'; Watanabe 7'	Stadium: Showa Denko Dome Oita; Attendance: 14,359; Referee: (Japan) Hajime Matsuo

9 November 2019 31	Júbilo Iwata	v	FC Tokyo	Iwata
13:00 JST				Stadium: Yamaha Stadium

=== J. League Cup ===
==== Results ====
6 March 2019 Group B	Kashiwa Reysol	2 – 1	FC Tokyo	Kashiwa
17:03 JST	Olunga 65', 69'	Report	Watanabe 32'; Jael (yellow card) 57'	Stadium: Sankyo Frontier Kashiwa Stadium; Attendance: 4,521; Referee: Hiroki Kasahara

13 March 2019 Group B	Vegalta Sendai	2 – 1	FC Tokyo	Sendai
18:00 JST	Ryang Yong-gi 16'; Nagasawa 24'	Report	Ota 63'	Stadium: Yurtec Stadium Sendai; Attendance: 6,304; Referee: (Japan) Yuichi Nishimura

10 April 2019 Group B	FC Tokyo	1 – 0	Sagan Tosu	Tokyo
19:00 JST	Watanabe (yellow card) 14'; Takahagi (yellow card) 19'; Kubo 84'	Report	Galović (yellow card) 26'; Cho Dong-geon (yellow card) 46'; Isaac Cuenca (yellow card) 72'	Stadium: Chichibunomiya Rugby Stadium; Attendance: 5,181; Referee: (Japan) Yoshiro Imamura

24 April 2019 Group B	FC Tokyo	2 – 0	Kashiwa Reysol	Saitama
19:00 JST	Na Sang-ho 50'; Diego Oliveira 89'	Report	Cristiano (yellow card) 90+4'	Stadium: NACK5 Stadium Omiya; Attendance: 3,524; Referee: (Japan) Koichiro Fukushima

8 May 2019 Group B	FC Tokyo	0 – 0	Vegalta Sendai	Tokyo
19:00 JST	Tagawa (yellow card) 61'	Report	Nagasawa (yellow card) 15'; Sekiguchi (yellow card) 89'	Stadium: Chichibunomiya Rugby Stadium; Attendance: 9,910; Referee: (Japan) Hiroyuki Kimura

22 May 2019 Group B	Sagan Tosu	0 – 1	FC Tokyo	Tosu
19:00 JST	Galović (yellow card) 37'; Cho Dong-geon (yellow card) 52'	Report	Okazaki (yellow card) 6'; Arthur Silva (yellow card) 27'; Yu In-soo 45'	Stadium: Ekimae Real Estate Stadium; Attendance: 7,120; Referee: (Japan) Takuto Okabe

19 June 2019 Play Off First Leg	FC Tokyo	1 – 0	Cerezo Osaka	Chōfu
19:00 JST	Yajima (yellow card) 35'; Nagai 43'	Report	Tanaka (yellow card) 49'; Yamashita (yellow card) 82'	Stadium: Ajinomoto Stadium; Attendance: 5,943; Referee: (Japan) Minoru Tōjō

26 June 2019 Play Off Second Leg	Cerezo Osaka	1 – 1 (1 – 2 agg.)	FC Tokyo	Osaka
19:00 JST	Bruno Mendes 62'	Report	Yajima 75'	Stadium: Yanmar Stadium Nagai; Attendance: 6,116; Referee: (Japan) Nobutsugu Murakami

=== Emperor's Cup ===
3 July 2019 Second Round	FC Tokyo	1 – 0	Toin University of Yokohama	Chōfu
19:00		Report		Stadium: Ajinomoto Stadium

14 August 2019 Third Round	FC Tokyo	0 – 1	Ventforet Kofu	Kōfu
19:00		Report		Stadium: Yamanashi Chuo Bank Stadium
