= 2018 FC Tokyo season =

FC Tokyo
2018 season
- Manager: Kenta Hasegawa
- Stadium: Ajinomoto Stadium
- J1 League: 6th
- Emperor's Cup: Fourth round
- J.League Cup: Group stage
- Top goalscorer: League: Diego Oliveira (13); All: Diego Oliveira (14)
Home colours	Away colours

2018 FC Tokyo season.

== Squad ==
As of 14 January 2018. Note: Flags indicate national team as defined under FIFA eligibility rules; some limited exceptions apply. Players may hold more than one non-FIFA nationality.

No.	Pos.	Nation	Player
1	GK	JPN	Takuo Okubo
2	DF	JPN	Sei Muroya
3	DF	JPN	Masato Morishige (captain)
4	DF	JPN	Kazunori Yoshimoto
5	DF	JPN	Yuichi Maruyama
6	DF	JPN	Kosuke Ota
7	MF	JPN	Takuji Yonemoto
8	MF	JPN	Yojiro Takahagi
9	FW	BRA	Diego Oliveira (on loan from Kashiwa Reysol)
10	MF	JPN	Yohei Kajiyama
11	FW	JPN	Kensuke Nagai
15	FW	JPN	Takefusa Kubo
17	FW	JPN	Cayman Togashi (on loan from Yokohama F. Marinos)
18	MF	JPN	Kento Hashimoto
19	MF	JPN	Tasuku Hiraoka
20	FW	JPN	Ryoichi Maeda
22	DF	JPN	Masayuki Yamada
23	FW	JPN	Kiichi Yajima

No.	Pos.	Nation	Player
24	FW	JPN	Taichi Hara
25	DF	JPN	Ryoya Ogawa
26	DF	JPN	Takahiro Yanagi
27	MF	JPN	Sotan Tanabe
28	MF	JPN	Takuya Uchida
29	DF	JPN	Makoto Okazaki
30	GK	JPN	Riku Hirosue
31	DF	THA	Jakkit Wachpirom (on loan from Bangkok United)
33	GK	JPN	Akihiro Hayashi
35	MF	JPN	Yoshitake Suzuki
38	MF	JPN	Keigo Higashi
39	MF	JPN	Kotaro Omori
40	MF	JPN	Rei Hirakawa
44	MF	JPN	Manato Shinada
48	DF	KOR	Jang Hyun-Soo
50	GK	JPN	Go Hatano
51	MF	BRA	Lipe Veloso

=== Out on loan ===
Note: Flags indicate national team as defined under FIFA eligibility rules; some limited exceptions apply. Players may hold more than one non-FIFA nationality.

No.	Pos.	Nation	Player
—	MF	JPN	Hideyuki Nozawa (at Ehime FC)
—	MF	KOR	Yu In-soo (at Avispa Fukuoka)

== J1 League ==
=== League table ===
Pos	Team	Pld	W	D	L	GF	GA	GD	Pts	Qualification or relegation
4	Hokkaido Consadole Sapporo	34	15	10	9	48	48	0	55	
5	Urawa Red Diamonds	34	14	9	11	51	39	+12	51	Qualification for the Champions League group stage (Note: Urawa Red Diamonds qualified for the 2019 AFC Champions League group stage as 2018 Emperor's Cup winners.)
6	FC Tokyo	34	14	8	12	39	34	+5	50	
7	Cerezo Osaka	34	13	11	10	39	38	+1	50	
8	Shimizu S-Pulse	34	14	7	13	56	48	+8	49	

Source: Meiji Yasuda J1 League
Rules for classification: 1) Points; 2) Goal difference; 3) Goals scored

=== Matches ===
Match	Date	Team	Score	Team	Venue	Attendance
1	2018.02.24	FC Tokyo	1-1	Urawa Reds	Ajinomoto Stadium	35,951
2	2018.03.03	FC Tokyo	0-1	Vegalta Sendai	Ajinomoto Stadium	16,990
3	2018.03.10	Júbilo Iwata	2-0	FC Tokyo	Yamaha Stadium	13,928
4	2018.03.18	FC Tokyo	1-0	Shonan Bellmare	Ajinomoto Stadium	16,568
5	2018.03.31	FC Tokyo	3-2	Gamba Osaka	Ajinomoto Stadium	21,940
6	2018.04.08	V-Varen Nagasaki	2-5	FC Tokyo	Transcosmos Stadium Nagasaki	9,873
7	2018.04.11	FC Tokyo	2-1	Kashima Antlers	Ajinomoto Stadium	17,260
8	2018.04.14	Cerezo Osaka	1-0	FC Tokyo	Yanmar Stadium Nagai	17,790
9	2018.04.21	Shimizu S-Pulse	0-1	FC Tokyo	IAI Stadium Nihondaira	12,615
10	2018.04.25	FC Tokyo	3-1	Sanfrecce Hiroshima	Ajinomoto Stadium	13,425
11	2018.04.28	FC Tokyo	3-2	Nagoya Grampus	Ajinomoto Stadium	25,185
12	2018.05.02	Vissel Kobe	0-0	FC Tokyo	Noevir Stadium Kobe	9,015
13	2018.05.05	Kawasaki Frontale	0-2	FC Tokyo	Kawasaki Todoroki Stadium	24,677
14	2018.05.13	FC Tokyo	0-0	Hokkaido Consadole Sapporo	Ajinomoto Stadium	24,589
15	2018.05.20	Sagan Tosu	0-0	FC Tokyo	Best Amenity Stadium	12,163
16	2018.07.18	Kashiwa Reysol	0-1	FC Tokyo	Sankyo Frontier Kashiwa Stadium	11,453
17	2018.07.22	FC Tokyo	5-2	Yokohama F. Marinos	Ajinomoto Stadium	34,126
18	2018.07.27	FC Tokyo	0-1	V-Varen Nagasaki	Ajinomoto Stadium	23,063
19	2018.08.01	Kashima Antlers	1-2	FC Tokyo	Kashima Soccer Stadium	12,643
20	2018.08.05	FC Tokyo	1-0	Vissel Kobe	Ajinomoto Stadium	44,801
21	2018.08.10	Gamba Osaka	2-1	FC Tokyo	Panasonic Stadium Suita	24,879
22	2018.08.15	FC Tokyo	0-1	Kashiwa Reysol	Ajinomoto Stadium	20,986
23	2018.08.19	Hokkaido Consadole Sapporo	3-2	FC Tokyo	Sapporo Dome	18,521
24	2018.08.26	Shonan Bellmare	0-0	FC Tokyo	Shonan BMW Stadium Hiratsuka	13,191
25	2018.09.02	FC Tokyo	0-0	Sagan Tosu	Ajinomoto Stadium	30,867
26	2018.09.15	Vegalta Sendai	1-0	FC Tokyo	Yurtec Stadium Sendai	17,887
27	2018.09.22	Sanfrecce Hiroshima	1-1	FC Tokyo	Edion Stadium Hiroshima	19,031
28	2018.09.29	FC Tokyo	0-2	Shimizu S-Pulse	Ajinomoto Stadium	33,789
29	2018.10.07	Nagoya Grampus	1-2	FC Tokyo	Toyota Stadium	33,251
30	2018.10.20	FC Tokyo	0-1	Cerezo Osaka	Ajinomoto Stadium	28,053
31	2018.11.03	Yokohama F. Marinos	0-1	FC Tokyo	Nissan Stadium	27,252
32	2018.11.10	FC Tokyo	0-0	Júbilo Iwata	Ajinomoto Stadium	24,323
33	2018.11.24	FC Tokyo	0-2	Kawasaki Frontale	Ajinomoto Stadium	37,422
34	2018.12.01	Urawa Reds	3-2	FC Tokyo	Saitama Stadium 2002	46,770
