= Taichi Hara =

Japanese footballer (born 1999)

Taichi Hara 原 大智
Personal information
- Full name: Taichi Hara
- Date of birth: 5 May 1999 (age 27)
- Place of birth: Hino, Tokyo, Japan
- Height: 1.91 m (6 ft 3 in)
- Position: Forward

Team information
- Current team: St. Pauli
- Number: 18

Youth career
- Tamadaira SC
- 2012–2017: FC Tokyo

Senior career*
Years	Team	Apps	(Gls)
2017–2021	FC Tokyo	26	(3)
2017–2021	→ FC Tokyo U-23 (loan)	72	(28)
2021	Istra 1961	14	(2)
2021–2023	Alavés	15	(1)
2021–2022	→ Sint-Truiden (loan)	28	(8)
2023	→ Sint-Truiden (loan)	11	(0)
2023–2025	Kyoto Sanga	84	(20)
2026–	St. Pauli	13	(3)

International career^{‡}
2018	Japan U19	3	(2)
2019	Japan U20	4	(0)
2025–	Japan	2	(0)
Medal record
Representing Japan
AFC U-19 Championship
Bronze medal – third place	2018
- * Club domestic league appearances and goals as of 23 October 2026 ‡ National team caps and goals as of 15 July 2025

Taichi Hara (原 大智, Hara Taichi; born 5 May 1999) is a Japanese professional footballer who plays as a forward for German 2. Bundesliga club St. Pauli and the Japan national team.

== Club career ==
=== FC Tokyo ===
Taichi Hara joined J1 League club FC Tokyo in 2017. On 24 September 2017, it was announced that Hara would be promoted to the first team from the 2018 season. He made his league debut against Hokkaido Consadole Sapporo on 22 July 2020. Hara scored his first league goal against Sagan Tosu on 1 August 2020, scoring in the 86th minute.

During the 2019 season, as he was playing for FC Tokyo U-23, Hara was crowned the top goalscorer in the J3 League with 19 goals.

=== Istra 1961 ===
Hara signed with Croatian club NK Istra 1961 on 7 February 2021. Hara appeared in that year's Croatian Cup final, scoring twice as Istra lost 6–3 to Dinamo Zagreb.

=== Alavés ===
In July 2021 Hara moved to La Liga club Deportivo Alavés.

=== First loan spell at Sint-Truiden ===
On 23 August 2021, however, he was loaned to Belgian side Sint-Truiden for one year.

=== Second loan spell at Sint-Truidense ===
On 23 January 2023, after spending the first half of the season with Alavés, Hara returned to STVV, also on loan. He made his league debut against OH Leuven on 28 January 2023.

=== Kyoto Sanga ===
On 3 July 2023, Hara signed with Kyoto Sanga. He made his league debut against Kashiwa Reysol on 6 August 2023.

=== St. Pauli ===
On 31 January 2026, Hara joined German club St. Pauli.

== Career statistics ==
=== Club ===
As of 23 October 2026

Appearances and goals by club, season and competition
Club	Season	League			National cup		League cup		Continental		Total	
Club	Season	Division	Apps	Goals	Apps	Goals	Apps	Goals	Apps	Goals	Apps	Goals
FC Tokyo	2017	J1 League	0	0	0	0	0	0	–		0	0
FC Tokyo	2018	J1 League	0	0	0	0	3	0	–		3	0
FC Tokyo	2019	J1 League	0	0	1	0	1	0	–		2	0
FC Tokyo	2020	J1 League	26	3	–		2	0	5	0	33	3
FC Tokyo	Total		26	3	1	0	6	0	5	0	38	3
Istra 1961	2020–21	Croatian First Football League	14	2	4	6	–		–		18	8
Alavés	2021–22	La Liga	0	0	0	0	–		–		0	0
Alavés	2022–23	Segunda División	15	1	1	1	–		–		16	2
Alavés	Total		0	0	0	0	0	0	0	0	0	0
Sint-Truidense (loan)	2021–22	Belgian Pro League	28	8	1	0	–		–		29	8
Sint-Truidense (loan)	2022–23	Belgian Pro League	11	0	0	0	–		–		11	0
Kyoto Sanga	2023	J1 League	13	7	—		—		—		13	7
Kyoto Sanga	2024	J1 League	37	8	4	2	—		—		41	10
Kyoto Sanga	2025	J1 League	34	5	2	0	1	0	—		37	5
Kyoto Sanga	Total		84	20	6	0	1	0	—		91	20
St. Pauli	2025–26	Bundesliga	4	0	1	0	—		—		5	0
St. Pauli	2026–27	2. Bundesliga	9	3	1	0	—		—		10	3
St. Pauli	Total		13	3	2	0	—		—		15	3
Career total			191	37	15	9	7	0	5	0	218	46

=== International ===
As of match played 15 July 2025

Appearances and goals by national team and year
National team	Year	Apps	Goals
Japan	2025	2	0
Total		2	0

== Honours ==
FC Tokyo

- J.League Cup: 2020

Japan

- EAFF Championship: 2025

Individual

- Croatian Cup top goalscorer: 2020–21
