= Jang Hyun-soo =

South Korean footballer (born 1991)

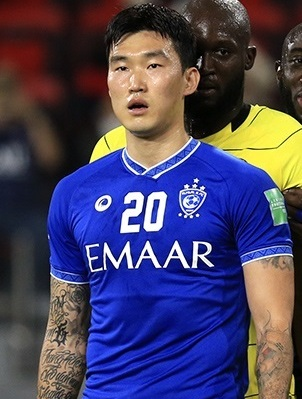
- Jang with Al-Hilal at the 2021 FIFA Club World Cup

Personal information
- Date of birth: 28 September 1991 (age 35)
- Place of birth: Seoul, South Korea
- Height: 1.88 m (6 ft 2 in)
- Position: Centre-back

Team information
- Current team: Al-Gharafa
- Number: 20

Youth career
- 2004–2006: Kyunghee Middle School
- 2007–2009: Kyunghee High School

College career
Years	Team	Apps	(Gls)
2010–2011	Yonsei University		

Senior career*
Years	Team	Apps	(Gls)
2012–2013	FC Tokyo	40	(4)
2014–2017	Guangzhou R&F	64	(3)
2017–2019	FC Tokyo	48	(4)
2019–2023	Al-Hilal	90	(4)
2023–	Al-Gharafa	33	(0)

International career
2009–2011	South Korea U20	25	(4)
2011–2016	South Korea U23	20 (Note: Includes five appearances as an overage player (four appearances in Summer Olympics, one appearance in friendlies).)	(3)
2013–2018	South Korea	58	(3)
Medal record
Men's football
Representing South Korea
AFC Asian Cup
Runner-up	2015 Australia
Asian Games
Gold medal – first place	2014 Incheon
EAFF Championship
Winner	2015 China
Winner	2017 Japan
Bronze medal – third place	2013 South Korea
AFF U-19 Youth Championship
Bronze medal – third place	2010 Vietnam
- * Club domestic league appearances and goals as of 27 April 2026

- Jang Hyun-soo
- Hangul: 장현수
- Hanja: 張賢秀
- RR: Jang Hyeonsu
- MR: Chang Hyŏnsu

Jang Hyun-soo (Korean: 장현수; Korean pronunciation: [tɕɐŋ.çʌn.su]; born 28 September 1991) is a South Korean professional footballer who plays as a centre-back for Qatar Stars League club Al-Gharafa.

== Club career ==
=== FC Tokyo ===
During the 2010 AFC U-19 Championship, where South Korea defeated Japan 3–2, Jang was noted for his aerial ability and passing skills in the defensive line by J.League clubs. He joined J1 League's FC Tokyo prior to the 2012 season after dropping out of Yonsei University at the end of the second grade. On 6 April 2012, he made his professional debut in a 1–0 win over Kawasaki Frontale. In his first season, he was not accustomed to maintaining a high defensive line, playing as a right-back occasionally. In 2013, he became Tokyo's main centre-back, and showed a gradual improvement in his field of view.

=== Guangzhou R&F ===
On 5 February 2014, Jang transferred to Chinese Super League side Guangzhou R&F. That year, he helped R&F qualify for the AFC Champions League for the first time in their history. On 17 March 2015, he was sent off for pushing the referee with his stomach without repressing his anger in a 1–0 Champions League loss to Seongnam FC. During the first half of the 2017 season, he lost his place at the club due to the removal of the CSL's Asian player quota.

=== Return to FC Tokyo ===
On 12 July 2017, Jang returned to FC Tokyo. He captained Tokyo during the 2018 season. During the 2019 season, he was suspended for two league matches after hitting Riki Harakawa's face with his elbow in a J.League Cup match against Sagan Tosu, but the team retained the top spot at the league under his contribution until he moved to Al-Hilal in the summer.

=== Al-Hilal ===
On 12 July 2019, Jang signed for Saudi Pro League club Al-Hilal on a three-year contract. He played all minutes for Al-Hilal in the 2019 AFC Champions League knockout stage until the final, where they defeated Urawa Red Diamonds 3–0 on aggregate. He also won his first professional league title in the 2019–20 season. On 28 November 2020, he scored the opener in a 2–1 King's Cup final win over Al-Nassr, leading the club to win a continental treble.

On 23 November 2021, Jang led Al-Hilal to keep a clean sheet in the 2–0 Champions League final win over Pohang Steelers, achieving his second continental title. South Korean journalists reported that he was the leader of Al-Hilal's defense and his existence suppressed Pohang's attack.

After contributing to Al-Hilal's third consecutive league title in the 2021–22 season, Jang planned to play for K League 1 club Ulsan Hyundai the next season, but Al-Hilal invoked an option to extend their contract with him for one more year. In January 2023, he was selected for the Riyadh all-star team, and played a friendly against Paris Saint-Germain. He scored a goal before the match ended in a 5–4 loss. In February, he played all three matches until the final for Al-Hilal at the 2022 FIFA Club World Cup, where the team defeated Wydad Casablanca and Flamengo. In the final against Real Madrid, he and the team's defenders conceded five goals, while forwards scored three goals. On 5 June, he was diagnosed with a tumor in his lymph node. Al-Hilal decided not to renew the contract with him, but supported his medical expenses. He was replaced by Kalidou Koulibaly, who transferred from Premier League club Chelsea.

=== Al-Gharafa ===
On 23 November 2023, Jang joined Qatar Stars League club Al-Gharafa. Al-Gharafa extended his contract for a further three years on 3 July 2024 after qualifying for the AFC Champions League Elite as the league's third-place team. He played only six league matches in the 2024–25 season due to a hamstring injury in January 2025, and came back to the field at the beginning of 2025–26 season. He suffered a shock 7–0 defeat to Al-Ittihad at the Champions League Elite on 10 February 2026, but contributed to the club's second successive Amir of Qatar Cup title.

== International career ==
At youth level, Jang captained South Korea at the 2010 AFC U-19 Championship and the 2011 FIFA U-20 World Cup under manager Lee Kwang-jong. He was also appointed captain by Lee at the 2014 Asian Games, where he led the team to win all seven matches without conceding a goal until the 1–0 final win over North Korea.

Jang played as a key defender for South Korea under managers Uli Stielike, Shin Tae-yong and Paulo Bento. He played only the first two matches at the 2015 AFC Asian Cup, but attracted Stielike's attention after leading the team to win the 2015 EAFF East Asian Cup. He was deployed as a centre-back, defensive midfielder or right-back by Stielike, playing various roles. He played the most minutes in the South Korea squad in 2016. However, his performances as a right-back received low evaluations from journalists.

Jang was selected as an overage player and captain for the South Korea under-23 team for the 2016 Summer Olympics. In South Korea, Olympic medalists are exempted from mandatory military service, and the competition is considered a chance for athletes to change their fates. Jang was already exempted from military service by winning a gold medal at the Asian Games, but was exceptionally called up to the Olympic team as one of three overage players by manager Shin Tae-yong. Shin, who had watched Jang's leadership and versatility at the Olympics, used him as a main player like his predecessor after succeeding Stielike as senior team manager the next year. Despite the manager's trust, Jang was criticised for increasing his number of errors by fans and media.

Jang challenging for ball possession over Germany's Mats Hummels during the 2018 FIFA World Cup.

The criticisms towards Jang were continued at the 2018 FIFA World Cup. During a 2–1 loss to Mexico, Jang was involved in both of the opponents' goals. He conceded a penalty for handball after he tried a sliding tackle with he stretching his arm. He also tried a hasty sliding tackle in front of goal against second scorer Javier Hernández, who easily dodged after watching it. Prior to the last group stage match against Germany, Jang requested Shin to exclude him from the line-up, but Shin persuaded him to leave the team together after playing only the last match. He was deployed as a defensive midfielder instead of injured Ki Sung-yueng in the match against Germany unlike in the previous two matches, where he played as a centre-back. He showed improvement without making a big mistake while helping South Korea defeat Germany 2–0.

After the 2018 World Cup, Jang continued to play for South Korea under new manager Paulo Bento. On 23 October 2018, he was caught falsifying records of his volunteer work related to alternative service, which he had to do in exchange for receiving military exemption. On 1 November, the Korea Football Association gave him a lifetime ban from representing the national team and fined him $26,800. However, judoka An Ba-ul served only a six-month suspension for the same case before participating at the 2020 Summer Olympics.

== Career statistics ==
=== Club ===
As of 9 May 2026

Appearances and goals by club, season and competition
Club	Season	League			National cup (Note: Includes Emperor's Cup, Chinese FA Cup, King's Cup, Amir of Qatar Cup)		League cup (Note: Includes J.League Cup, QSL Cup)		Continental (Note: Appearances in AFC Champions League)		Other		Total	
Club	Season	Division	Apps	Goals	Apps	Goals	Apps	Goals	Apps	Goals	Apps	Goals	Apps	Goals
FC Tokyo	2012	J1 League	14	2	0	0	0	0	5	0	0	0	19	2
FC Tokyo	2013	J1 League	26	2	2	0	2	0	—		—		30	2
FC Tokyo	Total		40	4	2	0	2	0	5	0	0	0	49	4
Guangzhou R&F	2014	Chinese Super League	23	1	1	0	—		—		—		24	1
Guangzhou R&F	2015	Chinese Super League	16	1	1	0	—		5	1	—		22	2
Guangzhou R&F	2016	Chinese Super League	24	1	4	0	—		—		—		28	1
Guangzhou R&F	2017	Chinese Super League	1	0	1	0	—		—		—		2	0
Guangzhou R&F	Total		64	3	7	0	—		5	1	—		76	4
FC Tokyo	2017	J1 League	11	2	—		0	0	—		—		11	2
FC Tokyo	2018	J1 League	24	2	1	0	1	0	—		—		26	2
FC Tokyo	2019	J1 League	13	0	0	0	2	0	—		—		15	0
FC Tokyo	Total		48	4	1	0	3	0	—		—		52	4
Al-Hilal	2019–20	Saudi Pro League	22	0	3	1	—		13	0	3 (Note: Appearances in FIFA Club World Cup)	0	41	1
Al-Hilal	2020–21	Saudi Pro League	25	0	1	0	—		6	0	1 (Note: Appearance in Saudi Super Cup)	0	33	0
Al-Hilal	2021–22	Saudi Pro League	25	2	4	0	—		7	0	4 (Note: Three appearances in FIFA Club World Cup, one appearance in Saudi Super Cup)	0	40	2
Al-Hilal	2022–23	Saudi Pro League	18	2	3	0	—		5	1	4	0	30	3
Al-Hilal	Total		90	4	11	1	—		31	1	12	0	144	6
Al-Gharafa	2023–24	Qatar Stars League	11	0	2	0	0	0	—		1 (Note: Appearance in Qatar Cup)	0	14	0
Al-Gharafa	2024–25	Qatar Stars League	6	0	0	0	1	0	3	0	0	0	10	0
Al-Gharafa	2025–26	Qatar Stars League	16	0	4	0	0	0	6	0	1 (Note: Appearance in UAE–Qatar Super Cup)	0	27	0
Al-Gharafa	Total		33	0	6	0	1	0	9	0	2	0	51	0
Career total			275	15	27	1	6	0	50	2	14	0	372	18

=== International ===
List of international goals scored by Jang Hyun-soo
No.	Date	Venue	Opponent	Score	Result	Competition
1	5 August 2015	Wuhan, China	Japan	1–0	1–1	2015 EAFF Championship
2	8 September 2015	Sidon, Lebanon	Lebanon	1–0	3–0	2018 FIFA World Cup qualification
3	12 November 2015	Suwon, South Korea	Myanmar	3–0	4–0	2018 FIFA World Cup qualification

== Honours ==
Al-Hilal

- AFC Champions League: 2019, 2021
- Saudi Pro League: 2019–20, 2020–21, 2021–22
- King Cup: 2019–20, 2022–23
- Saudi Super Cup: 2021
- FIFA Club World Cup runner-up: 2022

Al-Gharafa

- Amir of Qatar Cup: 2025, 2026

South Korea U23

- Asian Games: 2014

South Korea

- EAFF Championship: 2015, 2017
- AFC Asian Cup runner-up: 2015

Individual

- EAFF Championship Most Valuable Player: 2015
- EAFF Championship Best Defender: 2017
