= Tsuyoshi Watanabe =

Japanese footballer (born 1997)

Personal information
- Full name: Tsuyoshi Watanabe
- Date of birth: 5 February 1997 (age 29)
- Place of birth: Koshigaya, Saitama, Japan
- Height: 1.86 m (6 ft 1 in)
- Position: Centre-back

Team information
- Current team: Feyenoord
- Number: 4

Youth career
- –2008: Obukuro FC
- 2009–2011: FC Tokyo
- 2012–2014: Yamanashi Gakuin Univ. High School

College career
Years	Team	Apps	(Gls)
2015–2018	Chuo University		

Senior career*
Years	Team	Apps	(Gls)
2018–2019	FC Tokyo U-23	6	(0)
2019–2021	FC Tokyo	75	(5)
2022–2023	Kortrijk	41	(1)
2023–2025	Gent	70	(4)
2025–	Feyenoord	39	(2)

International career^{‡}
2019–2021	Japan U23	4	(0)
2019–	Japan	13	(0)
- * Club domestic league appearances and goals as of 18:30, 31 October 2026 (UTC) ‡ National team caps and goals as of 08:25, 26 June 2026 (UTC)

Tsuyoshi Watanabe (渡辺 剛, Watanabe Tsuyoshi; born 5 February 1997) is a Japanese professional footballer who plays as a defender for Eredivisie club Feyenoord and the Japan national team.

== Club career ==
Watanabe joined J1 League club FC Tokyo in 2018. On 4 January 2021, he started for FC Tokyo in the final of the J.League Cup against Kashiwa Reysol. FC Tokyo won 2–1 to claim the third J.League Cup in club history.

On 28 December 2021, Watanabe signed a three-and-a-half-year contract with KV Kortrijk in Belgium. On 1 July 2023, Watanabe moved to fellow Pro League club KAA Gent on a permanent deal for a fee of €3,500,000.

On 23 July 2025, Watanabe joined Dutch side Feyenoord on a four-year contract. On 12 August, he scored his first two goals for the club in a 5–2 defeat to Turkish sideFenerbahçe in the third qualifying round of the UEFA Champions League.

== International career ==
On 1 January 2024, Watanabe was selected by manager Hajime Moriyasu as a member of the Japan squad at the 2023 AFC Asian Cup.

On 15 May 2026, Watanabe was selected in the 26-man squad for the 2026 FIFA World Cup.

== Career statistics ==
=== Club ===
As of match played 3 November 2026

Appearances and goals by club, season and competition
Club	Season	League			National cup (Note: Includes Emperor's Cup, Belgian Cup, KNVB Cup)		League cup (Note: Includes J.League Cup)		Continental		Total	
Club	Season	Division	Apps	Goals	Apps	Goals	Apps	Goals	Apps	Goals	Apps	Goals
FC Tokyo	2019	J1 League	20	2	2	0	9	1	—		31	2
FC Tokyo	2020	J1 League	28	2	0	0	3	0	7 (Note: Appearances in AFC Champions League)	0	38	2
FC Tokyo	2021	J1 League	27	1	0	0	7	1	—		34	2
FC Tokyo	Total		75	5	1	0	19	2	7	0	103	7
Kortrijk	2021–22	Belgian Pro League	7	0	2	0	—		—		9	0
Kortrijk	2022–23	Belgian Pro League	34	1	0	0	—		—		34	1
Kortrijk	Total		41	1	2	0	—		—		43	1
Gent	2023–24	Belgian Pro League	36	2	2	0	—		14 (Note: Appearances in UEFA Europa Conference League)	1	52	3
Gent	2024–25	Belgian Pro League	34	2	1	0	—		13	1	48	3
Gent	Total		70	4	3	0	—		27	2	100	6
Feyenoord	2025–26	Eredivisie	30	2	1	0	—		8 (Note: Two appearances and two goals in UEFA Champions League, six appearances and one goal in UEFA Europa League)	3	39	5
Feyenoord	2026–27	Eredivisie	9	0	0	0	—		4 (Note: Appearances in UEFA Champions League)	0	13	0
Feyenoord	Total		39	2	1	0	—		12	3	52	5
Career total			225	12	8	0	19	2	46	5	298	18

=== International ===
As of match played 25 June 2026

Appearances and goals by national team and year
National team	Year	Apps	Goals
Japan	2019	1	0
Japan	2023	1	0
Japan	2024	1	0
Japan	2025	5	0
Japan	2026	5	0
Total		13	0

== Honours ==
FC Tokyo

- J.League Cup: 2020
