= Diego Oliveira (footballer, born 1990) =

Brazilian footballer

Personal information
- Full name: Diego Queiróz de Oliveira
- Date of birth: 22 June 1990 (age 36)
- Place of birth: Curitiba, Brazil
- Height: 1.79 m (5 ft 10 in)
- Position: Striker

Youth career
- Paraná

Senior career*
Years	Team	Apps	(Gls)
2008–2009	Paraná	0	(0)
2009–2010	Al-Mesaimeer	0	(0)
2010–2013	Noroeste	0	(0)
2011	→ Suwon Bluewings (loan)	4	(0)
2012	→ Bahia (loan)	2	(0)
2013–2014	Osasco Audax	0	(0)
2014–2015	Boa Esporte	24	(5)
2015	Linense	0	(0)
2015	Ponte Preta	31	(3)
2016–2018	Kashiwa Reysol	57	(16)
2018	→ FC Tokyo (loan)	32	(13)
2019–2024	FC Tokyo	191	(61)
- * Club domestic league appearances and goals as of 8 December 2024

Diego Queiróz de Oliveira (Brazilian Portuguese: [dʒiˈeɡu oliˈvejɾɐ]; born 22 June 1990) is a former Brazilian professional footballer.

== Career ==
Recent sides include the Paraná, Qatari side Al-Mesaimeer, Noroeste and South Korean side Suwon Bluewings. On 22 April 2015, Diego signed for Brazilian side Ponte Preta.

== Career statistics ==
Appearances and goals by club, season and competition
Club	Season	League			State League		National cup		League cup		Continental		Total	
Club	Season	Division	Apps	Goals	Apps	Goals	Apps	Goals	Apps	Goals	Apps	Goals	Apps	Goals
Noroeste	2011	Paulista	—		14	3	0	0	—		—		14	3
Noroeste	2012	Paulista	—		13	2	0	0	—		—		13	2
Noroeste	2013	Paulista	—		17	2	1	0	—		—		18	2
Noroeste	Total		0	0	44	7	1	0	—		—		45	7
Suwon Samsung Bluewings (loan)	2011	K-League	5	0	—		0	0	0	0	1 (Note: Appearances in AFC Champions League)	0	6	0
Bahia (loan)	2012	Série A	2	0	—		0	0	—		—		2	0
Audax	2014	Paulista	—		30	4	0	0	—		—		30	4
Boa Esporte	2014	Série B	24	5	—		0	0	—		—		24	5
Linense	2015	Paulista	—		15	5	0	0	—		—		15	5
Ponte Preta	2015	Série A	31	3	—		2	1	—		—		33	4
Kashiwa Reysol	2016	J1 League	30	11	—		1	0	3	2	—		34	13
Kashiwa Reysol	2017	J1 League	27	5	—		2	1	6	1	—		35	7
Kashiwa Reysol	Total		57	16	—		3	1	9	3	—		68	20
FC Tokyo (loan)	2018	J1 League	32	13	—		1	0	3	5	—		36	18
FC Tokyo	2019	J1 League	33	14	—		0	0	6	2	—		39	16
FC Tokyo	2020	J1 League	28	9	—		—		2	0	4	1	34	10
FC Tokyo	2021	J1 League	35	13	—		1	0	7	2	—		43	15
FC Tokyo	2022	J1 League	30	4	—		0	0	1	0	—		31	4
FC Tokyo	2023	J1 League	33	15	—		2	0	3	1	—		38	16
FC Tokyo	2024	J1 League	32	6	—		1	0	2	1	—		35	7
FC Tokyo	Tokyo Total		223	74	—		5	0	23	11	4	1	257	86
Career total			342	98	89	16	11	4	33	14	5	1	478	130

== Honours ==
FC Tokyo

- J.League Cup: 2020

Individual

- J.League Best XI: 2019
