= Joan Oumari =

Association football player (born 1988)

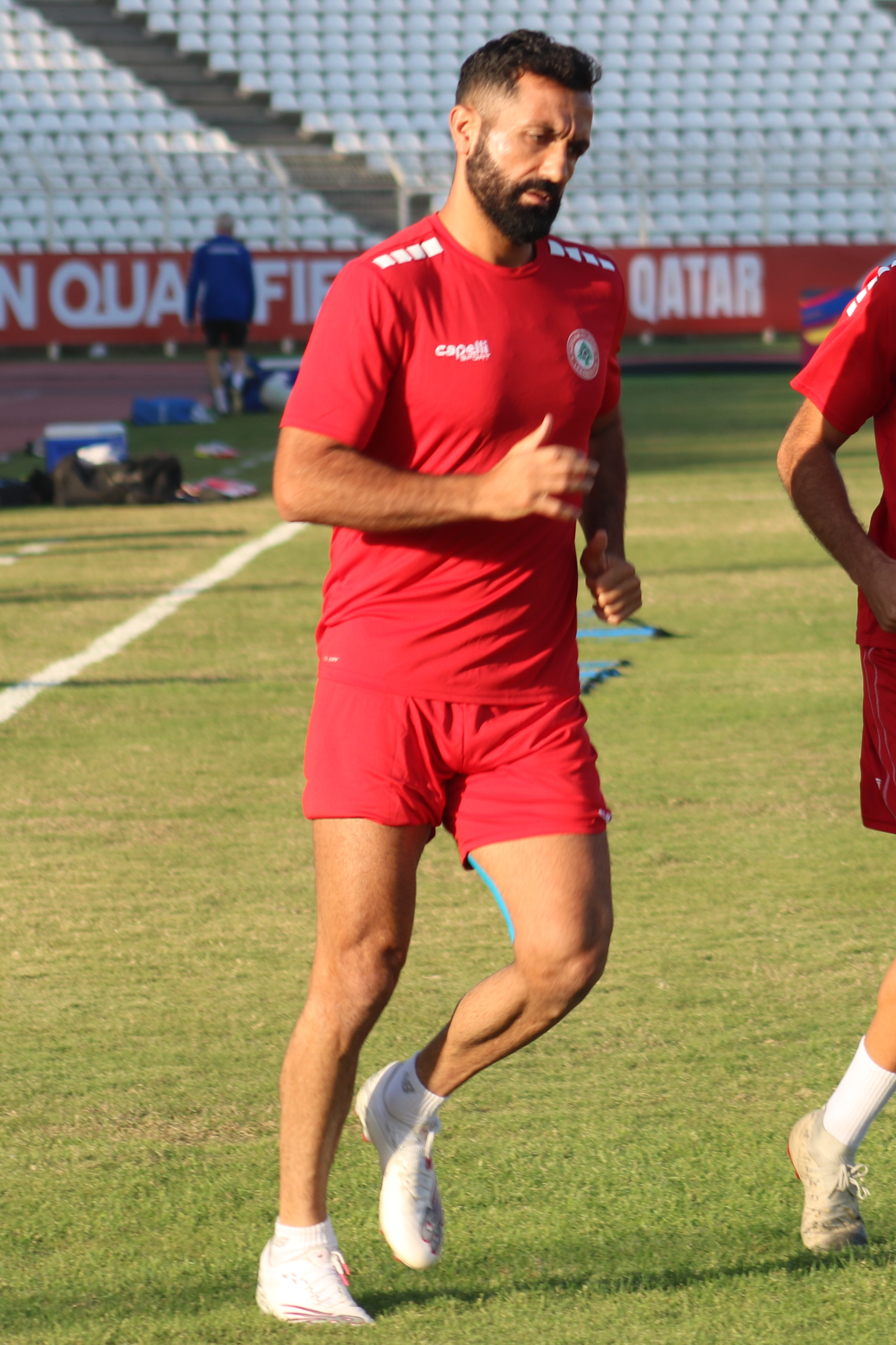
- Oumari with Lebanon in 2022

Personal information
- Full name: Joan Noureddine Oumari
- Date of birth: 19 August 1988 (age 38)
- Place of birth: Berlin, Germany
- Height: 1.87 m (6 ft 2 in)
- Position: Centre-back

Youth career
- Rot-Weiß Neukölln
- Reinickendorfer Füchse

Senior career*
Years	Team	Apps	(Gls)
2006–2008	Reinickendorfer Füchse		
2008–2011	SV Babelsberg 03	54	(1)
2011–2013	Rot-Weiß Erfurt	62	(3)
2013–2016	FSV Frankfurt	64	(2)
2016–2017	Sivasspor	30	(2)
2017–2019	Al-Nasr	41	(1)
2018	→ Sagan Tosu (loan)	11	(1)
2019–2020	Vissel Kobe	4	(1)
2020–2021	FC Tokyo	32	(2)
2022	Sagan Tosu	1	(0)
Total		298	(13)

International career
2013–2022	Lebanon	36	(4)
- * Club domestic league appearances and goals

Joan Noureddine Oumari (Arabic: جوان نور الدين العمري, Lebanese Arabic pronunciation: [lˈʕomari, -re]; born 19 August 1988) is a former professional footballer who played as a centre-back.

After playing for eight seasons in Germany, between the fifth and second division, Oumari moved to Turkish side Sivasspor in 2016. In 2017, he signed for UAE Pro-League club Al-Nasr, before moving on a six-month loan to Japanese side Sagan Tosu the following season. After returning to Al-Nasr for one year, Oumari moved back to Japan in 2019, playing for Vissel Kobe, FC Tokyo and Sagan Tosu.

Born in Germany, Oumari represented Lebanon internationally between 2013 and 2022. He took part in the 2019 AFC Asian Cup, Lebanon's first participation in the competition through qualification.

== Early life ==
Oumari was born on 19 August 1988 in Berlin, Germany, to Lebanese Kurds from Beirut. Oumari's parents emigrated from Lebanon to Germany in 1980 due to the Lebanese Civil War. He has two brothers, Ahmed and Hassan; the latter also plays football.

== Club career ==
=== Early career in Berlin ===
Oumari's youth career began at Rot-Weiß Neukölln. After a few years he moved to the youth section of Reinickendorfer Füchse. Oumari played in the Verbandsliga Berlin (fifth division) between 2006 and 2008. During the 2007–08 season, his team came first in the league with the fewest goals conceded, and were promoted to the NOFV-Oberliga Nord (fifth division).

=== SV Babelsberg 03 ===
In June 2008, Oumari – alongside his older brother Hassan who also played regularly for Reinickendorfer Füchse – moved to Regionalliga (fourth division) side SV Babelsberg 03. Oumari played 15 league games in 2008–09, mostly as a substitute. He also helped win the Brandenburg Cup.

During the 2009–10 season, Oumari played 11 league games. His best performance was on 5 March 2010, in 3–0 home win over ZFC Meuselwitz, where he gave two assists and was declared the man of the match. At the end of the season, his team came first with the fewest goals conceded in the league and were promoted to the 3. Liga (third division).

Oumari became a regular during the 2010–11 season; initially deployed as a left-back, Oumari was later moved as a center-back.

=== Rot-Weiß Erfurt and FSV Frankfurt ===
In May 2011, fellow-3. Liga side Rot-Weiss Erfurt announced the signing of Oumari on a two-year deal. In his first season he immediately took a regular place in central defence and played 29 league games. He played 33 games the following season. In three seasons in the 3. Liga (one at Babelsberg and two at Rot-Weiß), Oumari was a starter in 86 out of 89 games.

On 11 June 2013, Oumari made the jump to the 2. Bundesliga (second division), moving to FSV Frankfurt on a two-year contract with an option for a third year.

=== Sivasspor ===
During the winter transfer window of the 2015–16 season, Oumari moved to Turkish Süper Lig side Sivasspor. His first game for the club came on 16 January 2016, as a starter in a 3–1 away loss to Galatasaray. On his last game in the season, Oumari scored a goal against Fenerbahçe on 19 May 2016 in a 2–2 draw. However, the draw wasn't enough as his team was relegated to the TFF First League for the first time in 11 years. Oumari played a total of 17 games in the 2015–16 season.

In his six-month stay in the 2016–17 TFF First League, Oumari played 13 league matches and scored one goal, on 10 December 2016 against Göztepe.

=== Al-Nasr and loan to Sagan Tosu ===
On 3 January 2017, Oumari moved to UAE Pro League side Al-Nasr on a two-and-a-half-year deal. He played 32 league games in his first two seasons at the club.

In August 2018 Oumari signed for J1 League side Sagan Tosu on a six-month loan, becoming the first Lebanese player to play in the Japanese top flight. His first and only goal for the club came on 20 October 2018, against Vegalta Sendai in a 3–2 away win. Oumari played 11 league games for the club in the 2018 season.

Upon returning from loan to Al-Nasr, Oumari played nine league games in the 2018–19 season, as well as one cup game. He also debuted in the AFC Champions League, playing against Pakhtakor Tashkent of Uzbekistan in the 2019 play-off round.

=== Vissel Kobe ===
On 23 July 2019, J1 League side Vissel Kobe announced the signing of Oumari on a free transfer. He made his club debut on 17 August 2019, in a 3–0 home win against Urawa Red Diamonds in the league. He scored his only goal for Vissel on 19 October 2019, in a 3–1 home defeat against his eventual future club FC Tokyo. Oumari ended the 2019 season with one goal in four appearances in the league. He also made an appearance in the 2019 Emperor's Cup, which he won as his side defeated Kashima Antlers 2–0 in the final.

=== FC Tokyo ===
On 10 January 2020, Oumari joined J1 League runners-up FC Tokyo. His debut came on 12 July 2020 in the league, coming on as a substitute in a 3–1 away win against Yokohama F. Marinos. Oumari's debut from the starting lineup came two matchdays later, on 22 July, in a 1–1 draw against Consadole Sapporo. On 10 October, in a match against Gamba Osaka, Oumari lost a tooth in an aerial duel. Oumari's first goal came on 19 December in the final matchday of the 2020 J1 League, scoring the sole goal of the game against his former club Vissel Kobe.

On 4 January 2021, Oumari played in the 2020 J.League Cup final, helping FC Tokyo win 2–1 against Kashiwa Reysol. He finished played 19 games in the 2020 season: 12 in the league, one in the league cup, and six in the AFC Champions League. On 10 February 2021, Oumari's contract was extended for a further year.

Oumari scored his first goal of the 2021 season on 25 August 2021, opening the scoring with a header in a 2–1 win against Vegalta Sendai. He left the club on 5 December 2021, following the expiration of his contract.

=== Return to Sagan Tosu ===
After Oumari's contract expired with FC Tokyo, Sagan Tosu signed him on a free transfer on 25 February 2022. After having played only one league game and three cup games, Oumari terminated his contract with Sagan Tosu on mutual consent on 21 August.

== International career ==
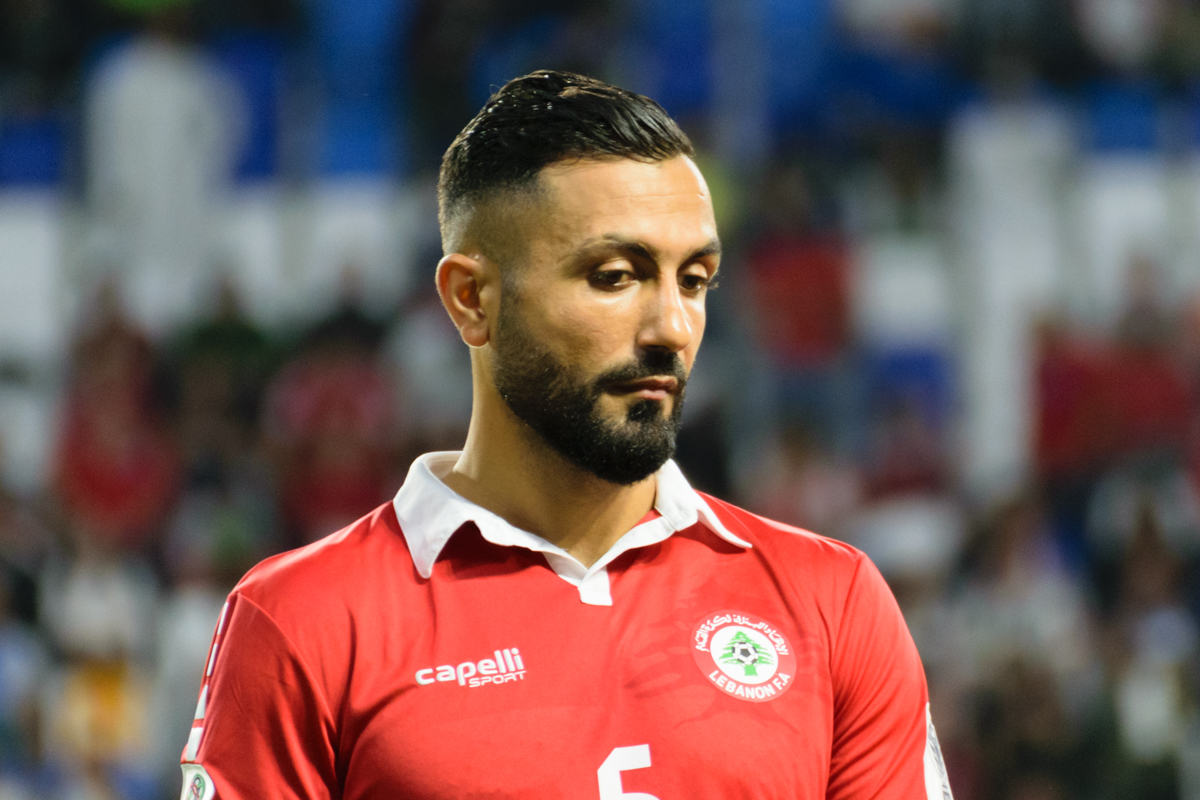
Oumari with Lebanon at the 2019 AFC Asian Cup

Oumari made his debut for Lebanon on 7 September 2013, under coach Giuseppe Giannini, in a friendly against Syria. He came on as a substitute in the 55th minute and, seven minutes later, received a direct red card. Oumari was excluded from the national team by Giannini; he returned to the team in 2015 under Miodrag Radulović.

Oumari's first goal for Lebanon came on 12 November 2015, scoring a 30-meter volley against Laos in the 2018 FIFA World Cup qualification. His second goal came five days later, scoring a header in a 1–0 friendly win against Macedonia. In December 2018, he was called up for the 2019 AFC Asian Cup squad. He played the whole 90 minutes in all three group stage matches; however, Lebanon wasn't able to reach the knock-out stages of the tournament.

On 5 September 2019, the Lebanese Football Association (LFA) announced Oumari's indefinite exclusion from the national team, alongside teammate Bassel Jradi, for refusing a call-up for a 2022 FIFA World Cup qualifying match against North Korea. After issuing an apology explaining his reasons for refusing the call-up, the LFA lifted the exclusions and Oumari was reintegrated to the national team on 19 September 2019.

On 5 June 2021, Oumari scored two goals against Sri Lanka, including a scissor kick, to help Lebanon win 3–2 in the 2022 World Cup qualification. He was voted West Asia Player of the Month of June by the AFC for his performance.

== Style of play ==
Initially a left-back, Oumari developed into a centre-back during the 2010–11 at SV Babelsberg 03. He also sporadically played as a defensive midfielder. Oumari's strengths lie mainly in his physicality and aerial threat. In 2008, his former coach Dietmar Demuth stated that Oumari, aged 20, "had a frighting commitment and aggressiveness, but for his age also serenity and view of the game".

== Career statistics ==
=== Club ===
As of match played 16 July 2022

Appearances and goals by club, season and competition
Club	Season	League			National cup (Note: Includes DFB-Pokal, Turkish Cup, UAE President's Cup, Emperor's Cup)		League cup (Note: Includes UAE League Cup, J.League Cup)		Continental		Total	
Club	Season	Division	Apps	Goals	Apps	Goals	Apps	Goals	Apps	Goals	Apps	Goals
SV Babelsberg 03	2008–09	Regionalliga Nord	15	0	—		—		—		15	0
SV Babelsberg 03	2009–10	Regionalliga Nord	11	0	—		—		—		11	0
SV Babelsberg 03	2010–11	3. Liga	27	1	0	0	—		—		27	1
SV Babelsberg 03	Total		54	1	0	0	0	0	0	0	54	1
Rot-Weiß Erfurt	2011–12	3. Liga	29	2	—		—		—		29	2
Rot-Weiß Erfurt	2012–13	3. Liga	33	1	—		—		—		33	1
Rot-Weiß Erfurt	Total		62	3	0	0	0	0	0	0	62	3
FSV Frankfurt	2013–14	2. Bundesliga	28	1	2	0	—		—		30	1
FSV Frankfurt	2014–15	2. Bundesliga	24	1	1	0	—		—		25	1
FSV Frankfurt	2015–16	2. Bundesliga	12	0	2	0	—		—		14	0
FSV Frankfurt	Total		64	2	5	0	0	0	0	0	69	2
Sivasspor	2015–16	Süper Lig	17	1	—		—		—		17	1
Sivasspor	2016–17	TFF First League	13	1	4	0	—		—		17	1
Sivasspor	Total		30	2	4	0	0	0	0	0	34	2
Al-Nasr	2016–17	UAE Pro League	12	0	3	0	—		—		15	0
Al-Nasr	2017–18	UAE Pro League	20	1	1	0	5	0	—		26	1
Al-Nasr	2018–19	UAE Pro League	9	0	1	0	1	0	1 (Note: Appearance(s) in AFC Champions League)	0	12	0
Al-Nasr	Total		41	1	5	0	6	0	1	0	52	1
Sagan Tosu (loan)	2018	J1 League	11	1	1	0	0	0	—		12	1
Vissel Kobe	2019	J1 League	4	1	1	0	—		—		5	1
FC Tokyo	2020	J1 League	12	1	—		1	0	6	0	19	1
FC Tokyo	2021	J1 League	20	1	0	0	3	0	—		23	1
FC Tokyo	Total		32	2	0	0	3	0	6	0	42	2
Sagan Tosu	2022	J1 League	1	0	2	0	1	0	—		4	0
Career total			298	13	18	0	11	0	7	0	334	13

=== International ===
As of match played 29 March 2022

Appearances and goals by national team and year
National team	Year	Apps	Goals
Lebanon	2013	1	0
Lebanon	2014	0	0
Lebanon	2015	8	2
Lebanon	2016	4	0
Lebanon	2017	2	0
Lebanon	2018	5	0
Lebanon	2019	5	0
Lebanon	2021	7	2
Lebanon	2022	4	0
Total		36	4

Scores and results list Lebanon's goal tally first, score column indicates score after each Oumari goal.

List of international goals scored by Joan Oumari
No.	Date	Venue	Opponent	Score	Result	Competition	Ref.
1	12 November 2015	Saida Municipal Stadium, Sidon, Lebanon	Laos	6–0	7–0	2018 FIFA World Cup qualification	
2	17 November 2015	Philip II Arena, Skopje, Macedonia	Macedonia	1–0	1–0	Friendly	
3	5 June 2021	Goyang Stadium, Goyang, South Korea	Sri Lanka	1–1	3–2	2022 FIFA World Cup qualification	
4	5 June 2021	Goyang Stadium, Goyang, South Korea	Sri Lanka	3–1	3–2	2022 FIFA World Cup qualification	

== Honours ==
Reinickendorfer Füchse

- Verbandsliga Berlin: 2007–08

SV Babelsberg 03

- Regionalliga Nord: 2009–10
- Brandenburg Cup: 2008–09

Al-Nasr

- UAE President's Cup runner up: 2016–17

Vissel Kobe

- Emperor's Cup: 2019

FC Tokyo

- J.League Cup: 2020

Individual

- IFFHS All-time Lebanon Men's Dream Team
- Brandenburg U21 player: 2008

== See also ==
- List of Lebanon international footballers
- List of Lebanon international footballers born outside Lebanon
- List of association football families
