= Kyosuke Tagawa =

Japanese association football player

Kyosuke Tagawa 田川 亨介
Personal information
- Full name: Kyosuke Tagawa
- Date of birth: 11 February 1999 (age 27)
- Place of birth: Nagasaki, Japan
- Height: 1.81 m (5 ft 11 in)
- Position: Forward

Team information
- Current team: Kashima Antlers
- Number: 11

Youth career
- Ardito FC
- Unzen Ardito FC
- 2014–2016: Sagan Tosu

Senior career*
Years	Team	Apps	(Gls)
2017–2018	Sagan Tosu	47	(6)
2019–2023	FC Tokyo	62	(8)
2019	FC Tokyo U-23	6	(2)
2022–2023	→ Santa Clara (loan)	39	(7)
2023–2024	Heart of Midlothian	14	(2)
2024–	Kashima Antlers	38	(3)

International career^{‡}
2016	Japan U17	1	(0)
2017	Japan U18	2	(0)
2018	Japan U19	4	(1)
2017–2019	Japan U20	6	(1)
2018	Japan U21	3	(0)
2018–2020	Japan U23	6	(1)
2019–	Japan	2	(1)
Medal record
Representing Japan
AFC U-19 Championship
Bronze medal – third place	2018
- * Club domestic league appearances and goals as of 9 August 2026 ‡ National team caps and goals as of 17:42, 29 March 2021 (UTC)

Kyosuke Tagawa (田川 亨介, Tagawa Kyōsuke; born 11 February 1999) is a Japanese professional footballer who plays as a forward for J1 League club Kashima Antlers.

== Club career ==
=== Early career ===
Born in Kagoshima, Japan, Tagawa began playing football when he was six years old. Since playing football, Tagawa said he was obsessed with scoring goals. This eventually earned him interest from other school, which Tagawa joined Unzen Ardito in his first year of elementary school. He eventually joined Sagan Tosu following his advice from his Unzen Ardito's coach.

Tagawa progressed through the youth ranks of Sagan Tosu for two years. While progressing at Sagan Tosu's youth ranks, he overcame with injuries. In May 2016, Sagan Tosu announced that Tagawa were among four players to be registered with the top team (second-type registration). In July 2016, he was described by the youth reporter of Web Gekisaka, saying: "His height of 181 cm is eye-catching, but his strength is his speed, running 50 meters in the low six seconds. He breaks into space and dribbles into the vital area, and fires off sharp left-footed shots". Then in September 2016, Tagawa was promoted to the first team.

=== Sagan Tosu ===
Tagawa's first appearance in the Sagan Tosu's first team was on 22 October 2016 as an unused substitute, in a 3–2 win against Kashiwa Reysol. On 14 January 2017, he was given a number twenty–seven shirt ahead of the 2017 season. Tagawa made his debut on 5 March against Kawasaki Frontale, when he replaced Takamitsu Tomiyama in a 1–1 draw. Ten days later on 15 March 2017, Tagawa made his first start for the club and set up the opening goal of the game, in a 2–2 draw against Albirex Niigata in the J.League Cup. He then scored his first goal for Sagan Tosu in the 87th minute, having came on as a substitute six minutes earlier, in a 3–0 win against Albirex Niigata on 8 April 2017. While on international duty with Japan U20 team at the FIFA U20 World Cup, Tagawa was awarded the league's YBC Levain Cup "New Hero Award". He returned to the starting line–up against Matsue City in the second round of the Emperor's Cup on 21 June 2017 and scored twice, in a 3–0 win to advance to the next round. Since returning from his international duty, Tagawa received playing time as the club's main striker. He then scored twice for Sagan Tosu, in a 2–2 draw against Urawa Red Diamonds on 23 September 2017. On the last game of the season, Tagawa scored his sixth goal of the season, in a 3–2 loss against Hokkaido Consadole Sapporo. At the end of the 2017 season, he went on to make thirty appearances and scoring six times in all competitions.

Ahead of the 2018 season, Tagawa signed a contract with Sagan Tosu. He scored the opener goal of the game, in a 1–1 draw against Vissel Kobe in the opening game of the 2018 season. His first goal of the season led the club to release a limited edition of commemorate Tagawa's first goal. He then scored the winning goal at the last minute, in a 3–2 win against Nagoya Grampus on 31 March 2018. However, Tagawa suffered a goal drought that eventually saw him demoted to the substitute bench, due to the arrivals of Fernando Torres and Mu Kanazaki. During the season, he was linked with a move to Premier League side Leicester City, but the move never happened. At the end of the 2018 season, Tagawa went on to make twenty–nine appearances and scoring two times in all competitions. Despite his goal drought during the season, he was nominated for the Best Young Player award.

=== FC Tokyo ===
On 4 January 2019, FC Tokyo announced on their official website they signed Tagawa on a permanent transfer.

He made his debut for the club, coming on as a substitute, in a 0–0 draw against Kawasaki Frontale in the opening game of the season. Since joining FC Tokyo, Tagawa said he has been making improvements to fight for his first team place, having found himself placed on the substitute bench. However, Tagawa suffered a hamstring injury that saw him out for two months. He then returned from injury, playing for FC Tokyo U23, coming on as a late substitute, in a 3–0 loss against Fujieda MYFC on 27 July 2019. Tagawa went on to score two goals while playing for the U23 side. He made his first team return for FC Tokyo, starting the match, in a 3–0 loss against Ventforet Kofu in the third round of the Emperor's Cup on 14 August 2019. A month later on 8 September 2019, Tagawa scored his first goal for the club, in a 2–1 win against Gamba Osaka in the quarter–finals in the J.League Cup and despite winning, FC Tokyo was eliminated through away goal. After the match, he said scoring a goal helped him overcome his frustrations on his goal drought. It wasn't until on 30 November 2019 when Tagawa scored his first league goal for the club, in a 1–1 draw against Urawa Red Diamonds. At the end of the 2019 season, he went on to make seventeen appearances and scoring two goals in all competitions.

Ahead of the 2020 season, Tagawa signed a contract extension with FC Tokyo. He played two matches in the opening game of the 2020 season before the season was interrupted due to the pandemic and it was pushed back to July. Once the season resumed behind closed doors, Tagawa made his first appearance, coming on as a 28th-minute substitute, in a 1–0 win against Kashiwa Reysol on 4 July 2020. However, during a match against Yokohama F. Marinos on 12 July 2020, he suffered a dislocated shoulder to win a penalty and was substituted as a result, as the club won 3–1. After the match, Tagawa was out for six weeks. It wasn't until on 5 September 2020 when he made return from injury, starting a match, in a 1–0 win against Oita Trinita. This was followed up by scoring in a 2–1 win against Yokohama FC. Tagawa then scored his second goal of the season, in a 3–1 win against Shimizu S-Pulse. At the end of the 2020 season, he went on to make twenty–five appearances and scoring two times in all competitions.

Ahead of the 2021 season, Tagawa signed a contract extension with FC Tokyo. The 2021 season proved to be a breakthrough season for him, as he became a first team regular for FC Tokyo. Tagawa started the season well when he scored two goals in two matches between 3 March 2021 and 6 March 2021 against Tokushima Vortis and Cerezo Osaka. Tagawa, once again, scored two goals in two matches between 17 March 2021 and 21 March 2021 against Shonan Bellmare and Vegalta Sendai. He scored his fifth goal of the season, in a 1–0 win against Tokushima Vortis on 23 June 2021. Tagawa made his 100th league appearance in the J1 League when he came on as a substitute, in a 3–3 draw against Cerezo Osaka on 21 July 2021. Tagawa then scored his sixth goal of the season, in a 2–1 loss against Urawa Red Diamonds on 25 September 2021. At the end of the 2021 season, he went on to make thirty–seven appearances and scoring six times in all competitions.

=== Santa Clara (loan) ===
On 18 January 2022, Tagawa was loaned out to Primeira Liga side Santa Clara for 18 months loan deal, with an option to make the move permanent.

He made his debut for the club, coming on as a substitute, and scored six minutes later, in a 2–1 win against Boavista on 1 February 2022. Tagawa then scored four goals between 10 April 2022 and 23 April 2022, including a brace against C.S. Marítimo. At the end of the 2021–22 season, he made twelve appearances and scoring five goals in all competitions.

At the start of the 2022–23 season, Tagawa became a first team regular, playing in a forward position. He then scored his first goal of the season, in a 2–1 loss against Sporting CP on 8 October 2022. On 5 April 2023, Tagawa scored a late consolation goal after coming on as a late substitute, in a 2–1 loss against FC Porto. At the end of the 2022–23 season, he made thirty appearances and scoring two times in all competitions. Following this, Santa Clara opted against signing Tagawa permanently and he returned to his parent club.

=== Heart of Midlothian ===
In the summer of 2023, Tagawa signed for Scottish team Heart of Midlothian. Upon joining the Jam Tarts, he apologised to FC Tokyo's supporters for leaving the club and stated that it was difficult to turn down a move to Europe.

Tagawa made his debut for Hearts, coming on as a 69th-minute substitute, in a 2–0 win against St Johnstone in the opening game of the season. On 17 August 2023, he made his UEFA Europa League debut against Rosenborg as a substitute and helped the club win 3–1 to advance to the next round. Three days later on 20 August 2023, Tagawa scored his first goal for Hearts against Partick Thistle in the League Cup. However, his start to his career at Jam Tarts suffered a setback when he suffered two separate injuries that saw him out for three months. It wasn't until on 2 December 2023 when Tagawa returned from injury, coming on as a 64th-minute substitute, in a 1–0 win against Kilmarnock. Upon returning from injury, he found his first team opportunities limited, with Lawrence Shankland and Kenneth Vargas preferred. After suffering a concussion, Tagawa was linked a move back to Japan, but he eventually stayed at the club for the rest of the 2023–24 season. Tagawa then scored two goals in the two matches in the 2023–24 season against St Mirren and Rangers. His both goals saw him regarded as a cult hero by the Jam Tarts supporters. He was also named the club's Player of the Month for May. In his first season at Heart of Midlothian, Tagawa made twenty–one appearances and scoring three goals in all competitions.

=== Kashima Antlers ===
On 9 August 2024, Tagawa joined J1 League club Kashima Antlers for an undisclosed fee.

== International career ==
=== Youth career ===
In April 2015, Tagawa was called up to the Japan U16 squad as part of the preliminary squad. He made his Japan U16 debut, coming on as a substitute, in a 2–1 win against Saudi Arabia U16 on 26 April 2015. Tagawa played once more for Japan U16 by the end of the month.

In March 2015, Tagawa was called up to the Japan U17 squad for the Sanix Cup International Youth Soccer Tournament. He played two matches on the 19 March 2015 against South Korea U17 and Hangzhou Greentown's youth team, as the U17 team drew 1–1 and won 5–0 (in which he scored in the game) respectively. Tagawa later scored two more goals in the tournament. A year later, he was called up to the Japan U17 squad for the Sanix Cup International Youth Soccer Tournament. Tagawa scored once more in the tournament. Four months later, Tagawa was called up to the U17 squad for the 20th International Youth Soccer in Niigata. He scored once in the tournament. In August 2016, he was called up to Japan U17 squad for the 23rd Vaclav Ježek International Youth Tournament. On 19 August 2016, Tagawa scored a hat–trick, in a 7–0 win against United Arab Emirates U17.

In January 2017, Tagawa was called up to the Japan U18 squad for the first time. He appeared two times for the U18 side, both coming on as a substitute and Japan U18 went on to win the tournament. In October 2017, Tagawa was called up to the Japan U18 squad for the AFC U-19 Championship qualification. He scored three goals in the qualifier matches, including a brace against Thailand U18 to help the U18 side qualify for the AFC U-19 Championship.

In August 2016, Tagawa was called up to the Japan U19 squad for the SBS Cup International Youth Soccer. He played three times for the U19 team, as they finished last place. Two years later, he was called up to the under-19 squad for a match against Mexico U19 and scored in a 1–1 draw. A month later, Tagawa was called up to Japan U19 squad for the AFC U-19 Championship in Indonesia. Tagawa played two times in the group stage, including scoring his first goal in the tournament, in a 5–0 win against Iraq U19 on 25 October 2018. However, he started in the semi–finals match against Saudi Arabia U19 but the under-19 squad loss 2–0 and was eliminated in the tournament.

In April 2017, Tagawa was called up to the Japan U20 squad for the training camp. The following month, he was elected Japan U-20 national team for 2017 U-20 World Cup in South Korea. Tagawa made his debut for the U-20 side, coming on as a substitute, in a 3–2 win against Honduras U20 on 16 May 2017. He made his first start for Japan U20, in a 2–2 draw against Italy U20 on 27 May 2017 to advance to the knockout stage. Tagawa made another appearance in the tournament, coming on as a late substitute, in a 1–0 loss against Venezuela U20 in the last sixteen of the 2017 U-20 World Cup. Shortly after Japan U20's elimination from the FIFA U-20 World Cup, he was called up by Japan U20 for the AFC U-23 Championship qualifiers. Tagawa played twice throughout July. Two years later, he was called up to the Japan U20 for the 2019 U-20 World Cup in Poland. In the first match of the Group Stage, Tagawa was at fault when he scored an own goal, in a 1–1 draw against Ecuador U20. In a follow–up match, Tagawa scored his first goal of the tournament and set up one of the goals, in a 3–0 win against Mexico U20. However, during a match against Italy U20, he suffered a hamstring injury and was substituted in the 22nd minute, as Japan U20 drew 0–0 and advanced to the knockout stage. After the match, it was announced that Tagawa would be withdrawing from the Japan U20 squad.

In December 2017, Tagawa was called up to Japan U21 squad for the AFC U-23 Championship. Tagawa started two matches for the U21 side, including setting up a goal for Ko Itakura, in a 1–0 win against Thailand U23. However, he started in the quarter–finals of the AFC U-23 Championship against Uzbekistan U23 but Japan U21 were eliminated from the tournament after losing 4–0. Five months later, Tagawa was called up to the Japan U21 for the first time ahead of the Toulon Tournament. He made two appearances, including scoring in a 3–2 win against Portugal U19, as the under-21 were eliminated in the Group Stage.

In March 2019, Tagawa was called up to the Japan U22 squad for the AFC U-23 Championship qualification. He only scored once for the under–22 side in the qualification round, in a 6–0 win against Timor-Leste U22, which was his only appearance.

In December 2019, Tagawa was called up to the Japan U23 squad for the AFC U-23 Championship. He played all three matches, as the U23 side were eliminated in the group stage. A year later, Tagawa was called up to the Japan U23 squad once again for the friendly match against Argentina U23. He played in both legs against Argentina U23, as the U23 won and lost on 26 March 2021 and 29 March 2021 respectively. There were expectations from the Japanese media that Tagawa would be included in Japan's Olympic football team squad following the country's successful bid to host the Summer Olympics. However, he failed to make the cut.

=== Senior career ===
In December 2019, Tagawa was called up to the Japan squad for the first time ahead of the EAFF E-1 Football Championship. He made his debut for the Samurai Blues, coming on as a substitute, in a 2–1 win against China on 10 December 2019. In a follow–up match, Tagawa scored his first goal for Japan and set up a goal for Koki Ogawa, who scored a hat–trick, in a 5–0 win against Hong Kong. However, he was placed on the substitute bench against South Korea, as the Samurai Blue loss 1–0 and finished second place in the tournament.

== Personal life ==
Tagawa said his hobbies is playing video games and his favourite video game called Call of Duty. In September 2021, he announced his marriage in a press release on FC Tokyo's website.

== Career statistics ==
As of the end for 2025 season.

Appearances and goals by club, season and competition
Club	Season	League			National Cup (Note: Includes Emperor's Cup, Taça de Portugal, Scottish Cup)		League Cup (Note: Includes J. League Cup, Taça da Liga, Scottish League Cup)		Continental		Total	
Club	Season	Division	Apps	Goals	Apps	Goals	Apps	Goals	Apps	Goals	Apps	Goals
Sagan Tosu	2017	J1 League	24	4	2	2	4	0	–		30	6
Sagan Tosu	2018	J1 League	23	2	2	0	4	0	–		29	2
Sagan Tosu	Total		47	6	4	2	8	0	0	0	59	8
FC Tokyo U-23	2019	J3 League	6	2	–		–		–		6	2
FC Tokyo	2019	J1 League	11	1	1	0	5	1	–		17	2
FC Tokyo	2020	J1 League	21	2	0	0	0	0	4 (Note: Appearances in the AFC Champions League)	0	25	2
FC Tokyo	2021	J1 League	30	5	0	0	7	1	–		37	6
FC Tokyo	Total		62	8	1	0	12	2	4	0	79	10
Santa Clara (loan)	2021–22	Primeira Liga	12	5	0	0	0	0	–		12	5
Santa Clara (loan)	2022–23	Primeira Liga	27	2	1	0	2	0	–		31	2
Santa Clara (loan)	Total		39	7	1	0	2	0	–		43	7
Heart of Midlothian	2023–24	Scottish Premiership	14	2	3	0	1	1	3 (Note: Appearances in the UEFA Conference League)	0	21	3
Kashima Antlers	2024	J1 League	3	0	1	0	0	0	–		4	0
Kashima Antlers	2025	J1 League	25	3	2	0	2	0	–		29	3
Kashima Antlers	Total		28	0	3	0	2	0	0	0	33	3
Career total			196	28	12	2	25	3	7	0	241	33

=== International ===
As of matches played 14 December 2019

Japan national team
Year	Apps	Goals
2019	2	1
Total	2	1

Scores and results list Japan's goal tally first.

No	Date	Venue	Opponent	Score	Result	Competition
1.	10 December 2019	Busan Gudeok Stadium, Busan, South Korea	Hong Kong	2–0	5–0	2019 EAFF E-1 Football Championship

== Honours ==
=== Club ===
Kashima Antlers

- J1 League: 2025
