= Arthur Silva (footballer, born 1995) =

Brazilian footballer (born 1995)

Personal information
- Full name: Arthur Silva Feitoza
- Date of birth: 26 April 1995 (age 31)
- Place of birth: Boa Vista, Brazil
- Height: 1.85 m (6 ft 1 in)
- Position: Defensive midfielder

Team information
- Current team: Shonan Bellmare
- Number: 16

Senior career*
Years	Team	Apps	(Gls)
2014–2016	Joseense	0	(0)
2017–2019	Votuporanguense	0	(0)
2017	→ Audax Rio (loan)	0	(0)
2018	→ Novo Hamburgo (loan)	0	(0)
2018	→ Marcílio Dias (loan)	0	(0)
2019	→ FC Tokyo (loan)	7	(1)
2019	→ FC Tokyo U-23 (loan)	9	(0)
2020–2024	FC Tokyo	36	(0)
2021	→ Yokohama FC (loan)	11	(1)
2022–2024	→ Kataller Toyama (loan)	49	(11)
2024–2025	RB Omiya Ardija	48	(8)
2026–	Shonan Bellmare	19	(2)
- * Club domestic league appearances and goals as of 14 August 2026

Arthur Silva Feitoza (born 26 April 1995) is a Brazilian professional footballer who plays as a defensive midfielder for J2 League club Shonan Bellmare.

== Career ==
On 5 January 2024, Omiya Ardija announced the signing of Silva. Due to a pre-season injury, he did not join the team from the start, but he made his first start of the season in the Matchweek 8 against FC Osaka and scored the opening goal with a mid-range shot in the Matchweek 11 round against FC Imabari, his first goal after being transferred. He then scored his second goal of the season in the Matchweek 14 against Kamatamare Sanuki. Starting with this, he scored goals in five consecutive games, leading the team's attack, and was awarded the J3 League MVP of the month for the month of June. On 13 October 2024, Omiya Ardija secured promotion to J2 League for the 2025 season after a 3–2 win over Fukushima United. Six day later, they secured the J3 League title after a 1–1 draw against FC Imabari.

== Career statistics ==
As of match played 7 December 2025

Appearances and goals by club, season and competition
Club	Season	League			State league		National cup (Note: Includes Emperor's Cup)		League cup (Note: Includes J.League Cup)		Other		Total	
Club	Season	Division	Apps	Goals	Apps	Goals	Apps	Goals	Apps	Goals	Apps	Goals	Apps	Goals
Joseense	2014	—			5 (Note: Appearances in Campeonato Paulista A3)	0	0	0	0	0	—		5	0
Joseense	2015	—			11	0	0	0	0	0	—		11	0
Joseense	2016	—			13	1	0	0	0	0	—		13	1
Joseense	Total		0	0	29	1	0	0	0	0	0	0	29	1
Votuporanguense	2017	—			8 (Note: Appearances in Campeonato Paulista A2)	0	0	0	0	0	—		8	0
Votuporanguense	2018	—			0	0	0	0	0	0	0	0	0	0
Votuporanguense	2019	—			0	0	0	0	0	0	0	0	0	0
Votuporanguense	Total		0	0	8	0	0	0	0	0	0	0	8	0
Audax Rio (loan)	2017	—			15 (Note: Appearances in Campeonato Carioca A2)	2	0	0	0	0	3 (Note: Appearances in Copa Rio)	0	18	2
Novo Hamburgo (loan)	2018	Série D	0	0	1 (Note: Appearances in Campeonato Gaúcho)	0	0	0	0	0	—		1	0
Marcílio Dias (loan)	2018	—			13 (Note: Appearances in Campeonato Catarinense A2)	1	0	0	0	0	—		13	1
FC Tokyo (loan)	2019	J1 League	7	1	—		2	0	7	0	—		16	1
FC Tokyo U-23 (loan)	2019	J3 League	9	0	—		0	0	—		—		9	0
FC Tokyo	2020	J1 League	29	0	—		0	0	2	0	1 (Note: Appearance in AFC Champions League)	0	32	0
FC Tokyo	2021	J1 League	7	0	—		1	0	5	0	—		13	0
FC Tokyo	Total		36	0	—		1	0	7	0	1	0	45	0
Yokohama FC (loan)	2021	J1 League	11	1	—		0	0	0	0	—		11	1
Kataller Toyama (loan)	2022	J3 League	19	2	—		1	0	—		—		20	2
Kataller Toyama (loan)	2023	J3 League	30	9	—		3	0	—		—		33	9
Kataller Toyama (loan)	Total		49	11	—		4	0	—		—		53	11
RB Omiya Ardija (Note: Omiya Ardija changed its name to RB Omiya Ardija in 2025)	2024	J3 League	29	7	—		—		—		—		29	7
RB Omiya Ardija	2025	J2 League	19	1	—		0	0	0	0	1 (Note: Appearance in J2 League promotion play-offs)	1	20	2
RB Omiya Ardija	Total		48	8	—		0	0	0	0	1	1	49	7
Career total			160	21	66	4	7	0	14	0	5	1	252	26

== Honours ==
RB Omiya Ardija

- J3 League: 2024

Individual

- J3 League Monthly MVP: June 2024
- J3 League Best XI: 2024
