= Adaílton (footballer, born 1990) =

Brazilian footballer

Personal information
- Full name: Adaílton dos Santos da Silva
- Date of birth: 6 December 1990 (age 35)
- Place of birth: Camaçari, Brazil
- Height: 1.76 m (5 ft 9 in)
- Positions: Forward; winger

Team information
- Current team: Yokohama FC
- Number: 90

Senior career*
Years	Team	Apps	(Gls)
2008–2010	Fortaleza	0	(0)
2010–2015	Vitória	34	(11)
2011	→ Atlético Paranaense (loan)	26	(4)
2012	→ Ituano (loan)	9	(3)
2012	→ Joinville (loan)	20	(3)
2013	→ Ituano (loan)	16	(3)
2013	→ Ponte Preta (loan)	13	(2)
2014	→ Paraná (loan)	14	(7)
2015	→ Júbilo Iwata (loan)	39	(17)
2016–2019	Júbilo Iwata	103	(22)
2020–2023	FC Tokyo	131	(32)
2024	Ventforet Kofu	33	(14)
2025	Remo	23	(5)
2025–	Yokohama FC	30	(9)
- * Club domestic league appearances and goals as of 14 August 2026

Adaílton dos Santos da Silva (born 6 December 1990) is a Brazilian footballer who plays as Forward and Winger. He play for J1 League club Yokohama FC.

== Club statistics ==
Updated to the start from 2024 season.

Club	Season	League			State League		Cup		League Cup		Continental		Other		Total	
Club	Season	Division	Apps	Goals	Apps	Goals	Apps	Goals	Apps	Goals	Apps	Goals	Apps	Goals	Apps	Goals
Vitória	2010	Série A	11	3	11	3	3	0	—		0	0	1	2	26	8
Vitória	2011	Série B	—		4	0	—		—		—		—		4	0
Vitória	2012	Série B	0	0	2	0	—		—		—		—		2	0
Vitória	2014	Série A	0	0	3	1	0	0	—		—		3	0	6	1
Vitória	Total		11	3	20	4	3	0	—		0	0	4	2	38	9
Athletico Paranaense (loan)	2011	Série A	19	0	7	4	2	1	—		1	0	—		29	5
Ituano (loan)	2012	—			9	3	—		—		—		—		9	3
Joinville (loan)	2012	Série B	20	3	—		—		—		—		—		20	3
Ituano (loan)	2013	—			16	3	—		—		—		—		16	3
Ponte Preta (loan)	2013	Série A	13	2	—		—		—		4	0	—		17	2
Paraná (loan)	2014	Série B	14	7	—		—		—		—		—		14	7
Júbilo Iwata (loan)	2015	J2 League	39	17	—		0	0	—		—		—		39	17
Júbilo Iwata	2016	J1 League	34	6	—		0	0	1	0	—		—		35	6
Júbilo Iwata	2017	J1 League	32	8	—		2	0	5	2	—		—		39	10
Júbilo Iwata	2018	J1 League	4	1	—		0	0	1	0	—		—		5	1
Júbilo Iwata	2019	J1 League	33	7	—		2	2	3	0	—		—		38	9
Júbilo Iwata	Total		142	39	—		4	2	10	2	—		—		156	43
FC Tokyo	2020	J1 League	33	8	—		—		3	2	8	2	—		44	12
FC Tokyo	2021	J1 League	38	9	—		1	0	10	4	—		—		49	13
FC Tokyo	2022	J1 League	31	12	—		2	2	2	0	—		—		35	14
FC Tokyo	2023	J1 League	29	3	—		2	1	6	2	—		—		37	6
FC Tokyo	Total		131	32	—		5	3	21	8	8	2	—		165	45
Career total			350	86	52	14	14	6	31	10	13	2	4	2	464	120

== Honours ==
FC Tokyo

- J.League Cup: 2020

Remo

- Campeonato Paraense: 2025
