= Yojiro Takahagi =

Japanese footballer (born 1986)

Yojiro Takahagi 髙萩 洋次郎
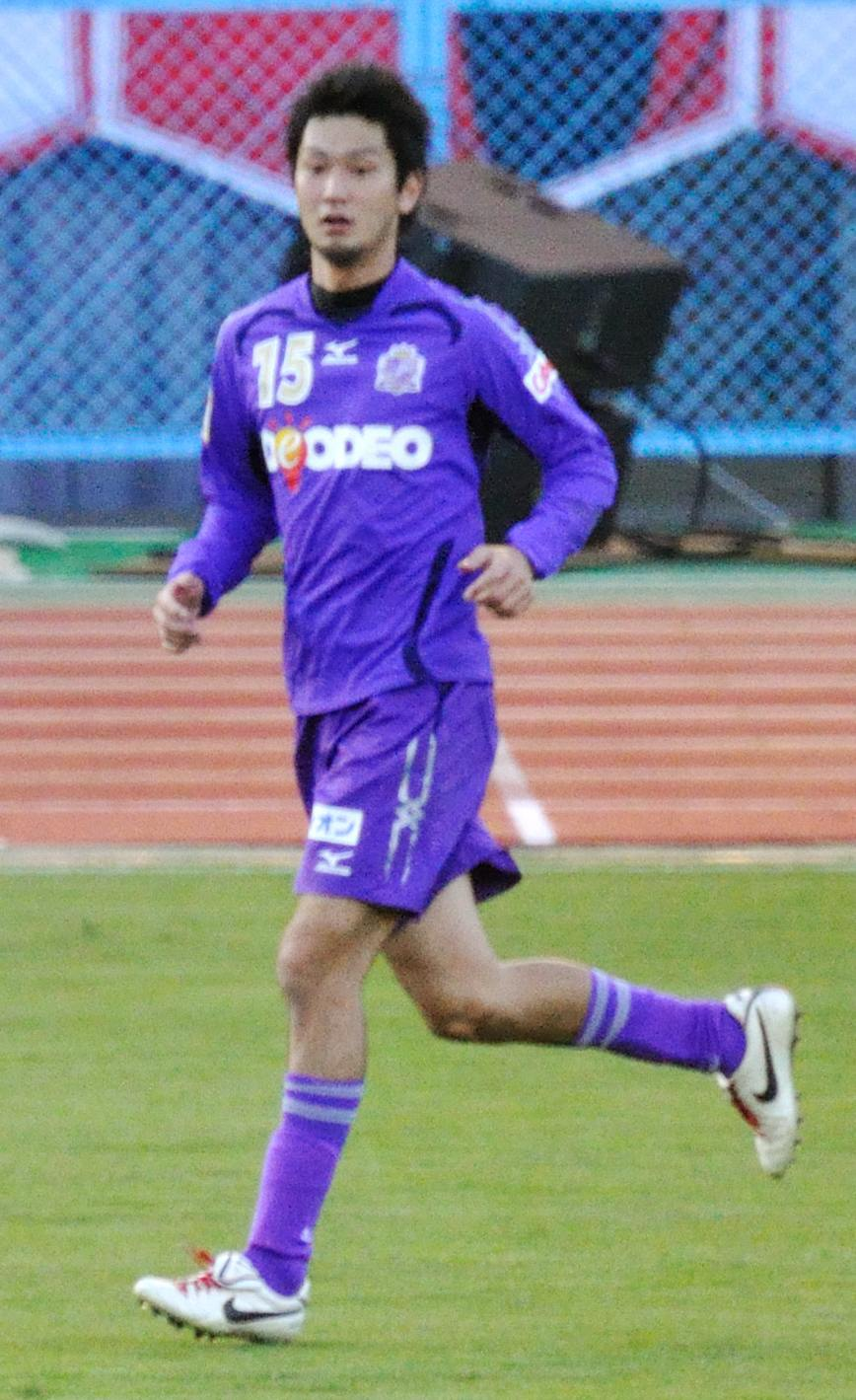
- Takahagi playing for Sanfrecce Hiroshima in 2010

Personal information
- Full name: Yojiro Takahagi
- Date of birth: 2 August 1986 (age 40)
- Place of birth: Iwaki, Fukushima, Japan
- Height: 1.83 m (6 ft 0 in)
- Positions: Midfielder; forward

Youth career
- 2002–2003: Sanfrecce Hiroshima

Senior career*
Years	Team	Apps	(Gls)
2003–2014	Sanfrecce Hiroshima	226	(36)
2006	→ Ehime FC (loan)	44	(3)
2015	Western Sydney Wanderers	11	(2)
2015–2016	FC Seoul	46	(3)
2017–2023	FC Tokyo	145	(4)
2022–2023	→ Tochigi SC (loan)	15	(1)
2024	Albirex Niigata (S)	13	(0)

International career
2013–2017	Japan	3	(0)
Medal record
Sanfrecce Hiroshima
Winner	J1 League	2012
Winner	J1 League	2013
Runner-up	J.League Cup	2010
Runner-up	J.League Cup	2014
Runner-up	Emperor's Cup	2007
Runner-up	Emperor's Cup	2013
Representing Japan
AFC U-19 Championship
Bronze medal – third place	2004 Malaysia
- * Club domestic league appearances and goals as of 22:37, 10 February 2023 (UTC)

Yojiro Takahagi (髙萩 洋次郎, Takahagi Yōjiro; born 2 August 1986) is a Japanese professional footballer who plays primarily as an attacking-midfielder for Singapore Premier League club Albirex Niigata (S), whom he vice-captains and the Japan national team. Mainly an attacking-midfielder, he is also capable of playing as a central-midfielder, defensive-midfielder or occasionally as a striker and winger.

== Club career ==
=== Sanfrecce Hiroshima ===
Takahagi started his professional career at Sanfrecce Hiroshima, a club he previously played with at youth levels. In 2006, Takahagi played a full season on loan with Ehime FC, before returning to Sanfrecce Hiroshima in 2007.

=== Western Sydney Wanderers ===
On 14 January 2015, Takahagi signed with Western Sydney Wanderers for their 2015 AFC Champions League campaign. He was released by the Wanderers on 6 June 2015.

=== FC Seoul ===
On 16 June 2015, Takahagi joined South Korean side FC Seoul in K League Classic.

=== Albirex Niigata (Singapore) ===
On 25 December 2023, Takahagi was announced as Albirex Niigata Singapore's new signing for the upcoming 2024–25 Singapore Premier League season.

== Club statistics ==
As of start of the 2023 season

Appearances and goals by club, season and competition
Club	Season	League		Cup		J.League Cup		Continental		Other^{1}		Total	
Club	Season	Apps	Goals	Apps	Goals	Apps	Goals	Apps	Goals	Apps	Goals	Apps	Goals
Sanfrecce Hiroshima	2003	4	0	0	0	—		—		—		4	0
Sanfrecce Hiroshima	2004	4	1	0	0	0	0	—		—		4	1
Sanfrecce Hiroshima	2005	0	0	0	0	0	0	—		—		0	0
Sanfrecce Hiroshima	Total	8	1	0	0	0	0	—		—		8	1
Ehime FC (loan)	2006	44	3	2	0	—		—		—		46	3
Ehime FC (loan)	Total	44	3	2	0	—		—		—		46	3
Sanfrecce Hiroshima	2007	3	0	4	0	4	0	—		—		11	0
Sanfrecce Hiroshima	2008	38	14	4	0	—		—		1	0	43	14
Sanfrecce Hiroshima	2009	27	5	2	1	4	0	—		—		33	6
Sanfrecce Hiroshima	2010	22	4	1	1	5	1	2	0	—		30	6
Sanfrecce Hiroshima	2011	31	2	2	0	2	0	—		—		35	2
Sanfrecce Hiroshima	2012	34	4	1	0	5	0	—		1	0	41	4
Sanfrecce Hiroshima	2013	31	3	5	2	2	1	5	0	4	0	47	6
Sanfrecce Hiroshima	2014	32	3	1	0	5	0	7	1	0	0	45	4
Sanfrecce Hiroshima	Total	218	35	20	4	27	2	14	1	6	0	285	42
Western Sydney Wanderers	2014–15	11	2	—		—		6	1	—		17	3
Western Sydney Wanderers	Total	11	2	—		—		6	1	—		17	3
FC Seoul	2015	14	2	2	2	—		—		—		16	4
FC Seoul	2016	32	1	5	0	—		9	0	—		46	1
FC Seoul	Total	46	3	7	2	—		9	0	—		62	5
FC Tokyo	2017	30	1	0	0	5	0	—		—		35	1
FC Tokyo	2018	34	0	3	1	2	0	—		—		39	1
FC Tokyo	2019	33	2	1	0	8	0	—		—		42	2
FC Tokyo	2020	26	1	0	0	2	0	8	0	—		36	1
FC Tokyo	2021	19	0	1	0	10	1	—		—		30	1
FC Tokyo	2022	3	0	1	0	4	0	—		—		8	0
FC Tokyo	Total	145	4	6	1	31	1	8	0	—		190	6
Tochigi SC (loan)	2022	15	1	0	0	—		—		—		15	1
Tochigi SC (loan)	2023	0	0	0	0	—		—		—		0	0
Tochigi SC (loan)	Total	15	1	0	0	0	0	0	0	0	0	15	1
Albirex Niigata (S)	2024–25	0	0	0	0	0	0	0	0	0	0	0	0
Albirex Niigata (S)	Total	0	0	0	0	0	0	0	0	0	0	0	0
Career total		487	49	35	7	58	3	37	2	6	0	623	61

^{1}Includes Japanese Super Cup and FIFA Club World Cup.

== National team statistics ==
Japan national team
Year	Apps	Goals
2013	2	0
2014	0	0
2015	0	0
2016	0	0
2017	1	0
Total	3	0

== Honours ==
=== Club ===
Sanfrecce Hiroshima

- J1 League: 2012, 2013
- J2 League: 2008
- Japanese Super Cup: 2008, 2013

FC Seoul

- K League 1: 2016
- Korean FA Cup: 2015

FC Tokyo

- J.League Cup: 2020

=== Japan ===
- EAFF East Asian Cup: 2013

=== Individual ===
- J.League Cup New Hero Award: 2010
- J.League Best XI: 2012
- Korean FA Cup MVP Award: 2015
