= Makoto Okazaki =

Japanese footballer

Makoto Okazaki 岡崎 慎
Personal information
- Full name: Makoto Okazaki
- Date of birth: 10 October 1998 (age 28)
- Place of birth: Kita, Tokyo, Japan
- Height: 1.81 m (5 ft 11 1/2 in)
- Positions: Centre back; right back

Team information
- Current team: Kagoshima United FC
- Number: 29

Youth career
- 2011–2016: FC Tokyo

Senior career*
Years	Team	Apps	(Gls)
2016–2019	FC Tokyo U-23	71	(3)
2017–2022	FC Tokyo	51	(1)
2020	→ Shimizu S-Pulse (loan)	12	(0)
2023–2024	Roasso Kumamoto	9	(0)
2024	FC Gifu (loan)	9	(0)
2025–	Kagoshima United FC	16	(1)
Medal record
Representing Japan
Asian Games
Silver medal – second place	2018 Jakarta-Palembang	Team
- * Club domestic league appearances and goals as of 1 January 2026

Makoto Okazaki (岡崎 慎, Okazaki Makoto; born 10 October 1998) is a Japanese football player who plays as a centre-back for Kyushu Soccer League club Kagoshima United FC.

== Career ==
Okazaki joined FC Tokyo in 2016. On 13 March, he debuted in J3 League (v SC Sagamihara).

In November 2022, it was announced Okazaki would be transferring to J2 League club Roasso Kumamoto after seven seasons with boyhood club FC Tokyo.

== Club statistics ==
As of start of the 2023 season.

Appearances and goals by club, season and competition
Club	Season	League			National Cup		League Cup		Other		Total	
Club	Season	Division	Apps	Goals	Apps	Goals	Apps	Goals	Apps	Goals	Apps	Goals
Japan			League		Emperor's Cup		J.League Cup		Other		Total	
FC Tokyo U-23 (loan)	2016	J3 League	29	2	–		–		–		29	2
FC Tokyo U-23 (loan)	2017	J3 League	20	1	–		–		–		20	1
FC Tokyo U-23 (loan)	2018	J3 League	16	0	–		–		–		16	0
FC Tokyo U-23 (loan)	2019	J3 League	6	0	–		–		–		6	0
FC Tokyo U-23 (loan)	Total		71	3	0	0	0	0	0	0	71	3
FC Tokyo	2018	J1 League	5	1	1	0	5	0	–		11	1
FC Tokyo	2019	J1 League	7	0	2	0	6	0	–		15	0
FC Tokyo	2021	J1 League	9	0	1	0	7	0	–		17	0
FC Tokyo	2022	J1 League	5	0	0	0	3	0	–		8	0
FC Tokyo	Total		26	1	4	0	21	0	0	0	51	1
Shimizu S-Pulse (loan)	2020	J1 League	9	0	0	0	3	0	–		12	0
Roasso Kumamoto	2023	J2 League	0	0	0	0	–		–		0	0
Career total			106	4	4	0	24	0	0	0	134	4
