= Keigo Higashi =

Japanese footballer (born 1990)

Keigo Higashi 東 慶悟
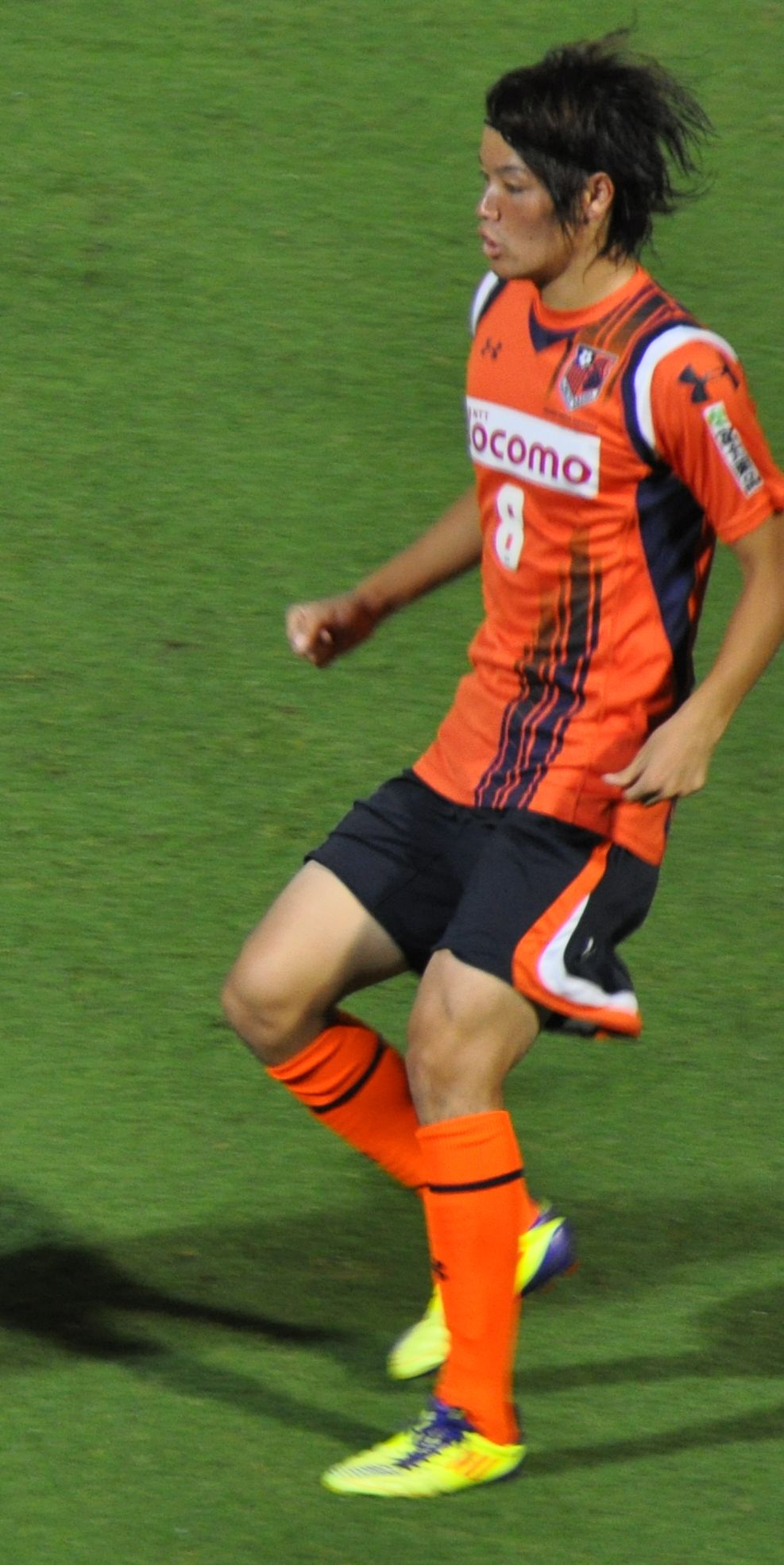

Personal information
- Full name: Keigo Higashi
- Date of birth: 20 July 1990 (age 36)
- Place of birth: Kitakyūshū, Fukuoka, Japan
- Height: 1.78 m (5 ft 10 in)
- Position: Attacking midfielder

Youth career
- 2003–2005: Wakamatsu Junior High School
- 2006–2008: Oita Trinita

Senior career*
Years	Team	Apps	(Gls)
2009–2010	Oita Trinita	52	(8)
2011–2012	Omiya Ardija	53	(9)
2013–2026	FC Tokyo	336	(17)
Total		441	(34)

International career^{‡}
2010–2012	Japan U23	31	(5)
Medal record
Representing Japan
Asian Games
Gold medal – first place	2010 Guangzhou	Team
- * Club domestic league appearances and goals as of 09:07, 9 October 2026 (UTC) ‡ National team caps and goals as of 10 August 2012

Keigo Higashi (東 慶悟, Higashi Keigo; born 20 July 1990) is a Japanese former professional footballer who played as an attacking midfielder. In a career spanning 18 years, Higashi played for Oita Trinita, Omiya Ardija and most notably made over 400 appearances for FC Tokyo.

== National team career ==
In July 2012, Higashi was selected to the Japan U23 team for 2012 Summer Olympics. At this tournament, he wore the number 10 shirt for Japan and played all 6 matches. The team finished fourth.

== Club statistics ==
Appearances and goals by club, season and competition
Club	Season	League			National cup (Note: Includes Emperor's Cup)		League cup (Note: Includes J.League Cup)		Continental		Other		Total	
Club	Season	Division	Apps	Goals	Apps	Goals	Apps	Goals	Apps	Goals	Apps	Goals	Apps	Goals
Oita Trinita	2009	J.League Division 1	23	2	2	1	3	0	–		1 (Note: Appearance in Suruga Bank Championship)	1	29	4
Oita Trinita	2010	J.League Division 2	29	6	2	1	0	0	–		0	0	31	7
Oita Trinita	Total		52	8	4	2	3	0	0	0	1	1	60	11
Omiya Ardija	2011	J.League Division 1	27	8	1	0	1	0	–		–		29	8
Omiya Ardija	2012	J.League Division 1	26	1	3	2	3	0	–		–		32	3
Omiya Ardija	Total		53	9	4	2	4	0	0	0	0	0	61	11
FC Tokyo	2013	J.League Division 1	32	2	5	0	6	1	0	0	–		43	3
FC Tokyo	2014	J.League Division 1	23	1	0	0	5	0	0	0	–		28	1
FC Tokyo	2015	J1 League	25	4	2	1	8	1	0	0	–		35	6
FC Tokyo	2016	J1 League	28	2	1	0	4	1	7 (Note: Appearances in AFC Champions League)	1	–		40	4
FC Tokyo	2017	J1 League	30	1	0	0	4	0	0	0	–		34	1
FC Tokyo	2018	J1 League	34	4	3	1	2	0	0	0	–		39	5
FC Tokyo	2019	J1 League	34	1	0	0	5	0	0	0	–		39	1
FC Tokyo	2020	J1 League	7	0	0	0	1	0	6	0	–		14	0
FC Tokyo	2021	J1 League	35	0	1	0	9	1	0	0	–		45	1
FC Tokyo	2022	J1 League	24	0	2	0	5	0	0	0	–		31	0
FC Tokyo	2023	J1 League	30	1	3	0	7	0	0	0	–		40	1
FC Tokyo	2024	J1 League	14	1	2	1	2	0	0	0	–		18	2
FC Tokyo	2025	J1 League	18	0	3	0	3	0	0	0	–		24	0
FC Tokyo	2026	J1 (100)	2	0	–		–		0	0	–		2	0
FC Tokyo	Total		336	17	22	3	61	4	13	1	0	0	432	25
Career total			441	34	30	7	68	4	13	1	1	1	553	47

== National team statistics ==
As of 23 June 2011

National team	Year	Apps	Goals
Japan U23
Japan U23	2010	6	1
Japan U23	2011	6	1
Japan U23	Total	12	2

International appearances and goals
#	Date	Venue	Opponent	Result	Goal	Competition
2010
	8 November	Tianhe Stadium, Guangzhou	China U21	3–0	0	2010 Asian Games / Japan U21
	10 November	Huadu Stadium, Guangzhou	Malaysia U23	2–0	0	2010 Asian Games / Japan U21
	16 November	Huangpu Sports Center, Guangzhou	India U21	5–0	0	2010 Asian Games / Japan U21
	19 November	Huangpu Sports Center, Guangzhou	Thailand U23	1–0	1	2010 Asian Games / Japan U21
	23 November	Yuexiushan Stadium, Guangzhou	Iran U23	2–1	0	2010 Asian Games / Japan U21
	25 November	Tianhe Stadium, Guangzhou	United Arab Emirates U23	1–0	0	2010 Asian Games / Japan U21
2011
	9 February	Mohammed Al-Hamad Stadium, Hawalli	Kuwait	0–3	0	Friendly / Japan U22
	26 March	Pakhtakor Markaziy Stadium, Tashkent	Uzbekistan U22	0–1	0	Friendly / Japan U22
	29 March	JAR Stadium, Tashkent	Uzbekistan U22	2–1	1	Friendly / Japan U22
	1 June	Niigata Stadium, Niigata	Australia U22	3–1	0	Friendly / Japan U22
	19 June	Toyota Stadium, Toyota	Kuwait U22	3–1	0	2012 Summer Olympics qualification / Japan U22
	23 June	Mohammed Al-Hamad Stadium, Hawalli	Kuwait U22	1–2	0	2012 Summer Olympics qualification / Japan U22

== Honours ==
=== Japan ===
- Asian Games : 2010

=== Club ===
FC Tokyo

- J.League Cup : 2020
