= 2017 FC Tokyo season =

FC Tokyo
2017 season
- Manager: Yoshiyuki Shinoda; Takayoshi Amma
- Stadium: Ajinomoto Stadium
- J1 League: 13th
Home colours	Away colours

2017 FC Tokyo season.

== J1 League ==
=== League table ===
Pos	Team	Pld	W	D	L	GF	GA	GD	Pts
11	Consadole Sapporo	34	12	7	15	39	47	−8	43
12	Vegalta Sendai	34	11	8	15	44	53	−9	41
13	FC Tokyo	34	10	10	14	37	42	−5	40
14	Shimizu S-Pulse	34	8	10	16	36	54	−18	34
15	Sanfrecce Hiroshima	34	8	9	17	32	49	−17	33

Source: Meiji Yasuda J1 League
Rules for classification: 1) Points; 2) Goal difference; 3) Goals scored

=== Matches ===
Match	Date	Team	Score	Team	Venue	Attendance
1	2017.02.25	Kashima Antlers	0-1	FC Tokyo	Kashima Soccer Stadium	28,240
2	2017.03.04	FC Tokyo	2-0	Omiya Ardija	Ajinomoto Stadium	27,259
3	2017.03.11	Gamba Osaka	3-0	FC Tokyo	Suita City Football Stadium	24,292
4	2017.03.18	FC Tokyo	3-0	Kawasaki Frontale	Ajinomoto Stadium	36,311
5	2017.04.01	FC Tokyo	3-3	Sagan Tosu	Ajinomoto Stadium	19,669
6	2017.04.08	Hokkaido Consadole Sapporo	2-1	FC Tokyo	Sapporo Dome	16,948
7	2017.04.16	FC Tokyo	0-1	Urawa Reds	Ajinomoto Stadium	38,248
8	2017.04.22	Albirex Niigata	0-3	FC Tokyo	Denka Big Swan Stadium	18,292
9	2017.04.30	FC Tokyo	1-0	Sanfrecce Hiroshima	Ajinomoto Stadium	25,037
10	2017.05.07	Vegalta Sendai	0-2	FC Tokyo	Yurtec Stadium Sendai	17,281
11	2017.05.14	FC Tokyo	1-2	Kashiwa Reysol	Ajinomoto Stadium	23,950
12	2017.05.20	Vissel Kobe	1-1	FC Tokyo	Noevir Stadium Kobe	24,814
13	2017.05.28	FC Tokyo	1-1	Ventforet Kofu	Ajinomoto Stadium	18,953
14	2017.06.04	Shimizu S-Pulse	0-2	FC Tokyo	IAI Stadium Nihondaira	13,442
15	2017.06.18	FC Tokyo	0-1	Yokohama F. Marinos	Ajinomoto Stadium	23,282
16	2017.06.25	Júbilo Iwata	2-0	FC Tokyo	Yamaha Stadium	13,816
17	2017.07.02	Cerezo Osaka	3-1	FC Tokyo	Kincho Stadium	14,305
18	2017.07.08	FC Tokyo	2-2	Kashima Antlers	Ajinomoto Stadium	42,979
19	2017.07.30	FC Tokyo	1-1	Albirex Niigata	Ajinomoto Stadium	21,908
20	2017.08.05	Kawasaki Frontale	1-1	FC Tokyo	Kawasaki Todoroki Stadium	25,043
21	2017.08.09	Omiya Ardija	1-2	FC Tokyo	NACK5 Stadium Omiya	11,115
22	2017.08.13	FC Tokyo	1-0	Vissel Kobe	Ajinomoto Stadium	30,642
23	2017.08.19	Urawa Reds	2-1	FC Tokyo	Saitama Stadium 2002	31,818
24	2017.08.26	Yokohama F. Marinos	1-0	FC Tokyo	Nissan Stadium	24,707
25	2017.09.09	FC Tokyo	1-4	Cerezo Osaka	Ajinomoto Stadium	36,635
26	2017.09.16	FC Tokyo	1-0	Vegalta Sendai	Ajinomoto Stadium	17,940
27	2017.09.23	Kashiwa Reysol	4-1	FC Tokyo	Hitachi Kashiwa Stadium	13,909
28	2017.09.30	FC Tokyo	0-0	Júbilo Iwata	Ajinomoto Stadium	26,736
29	2017.10.15	Ventforet Kofu	1-1	FC Tokyo	Yamanashi Chuo Bank Stadium	8,643
30	2017.10.21	FC Tokyo	1-2	Hokkaido Consadole Sapporo	Ajinomoto Stadium	16,817
31	2017.10.29	FC Tokyo	0-0	Shimizu S-Pulse	Ajinomoto Stadium	13,417
32	2017.11.18	Sagan Tosu	2-1	FC Tokyo	Best Amenity Stadium	19,476
33	2017.11.26	Sanfrecce Hiroshima	2-1	FC Tokyo	Edion Stadium Hiroshima	22,333
34	2017.12.02	FC Tokyo	0-0	Gamba Osaka	Ajinomoto Stadium	30,548
