= Kiichi Yajima =

Japanese footballer

Kiichi Yajima 矢島 輝一
Personal information
- Full name: Kiichi Yajima
- Date of birth: April 6, 1995 (age 31)
- Place of birth: Hachiōji, Tokyo, Japan
- Height: 1.86 m (6 ft 1 in)
- Position: Forward

Team information
- Current team: Fukushima United FC
- Number: 18

Youth career
- –2007: Hachioji CBX FC
- 2008–2013: FC Tokyo

College career
Years	Team	Apps	(Gls)
2014–2017	Chuo University		

Senior career*
Years	Team	Apps	(Gls)
2016–2019	→ FC Tokyo U-23 (loan)	38	(14)
2018–2020	FC Tokyo	14	(0)
2021–2023	Omiya Ardija	23	(1)
2023–	Fukushima United FC	60	(6)
- * Club domestic league appearances and goals as of January 1, 2026

Kiichi Yajima (矢島 輝一, Yajima Kiichi; born April 6, 1995) is a Japanese football player. He plays for Fukushima United FC.

== Career ==
Kiichi Yajima joined FC Tokyo in 2016. On March 13, he debuted in J3 League (v SC Sagamihara).

== Club statistics ==
Updated to 5 February 2021.

Club performance			League		Cup		League Cup		Continental		Total	
Season	Club	League	Apps	Goals	Apps	Goals	Apps	Goals	Apps	Goals	Apps	Goals
Japan			League		Emperor's Cup		J.League Cup		AFC		Total	
2018	FC Tokyo	J1 League	5	0	0	0	3	1	–		8	1
2019	FC Tokyo	J1 League	9	0	1	0	6	1	–		16	1
2020	FC Tokyo	J1 League	3	0	–		0	0	1	0	4	0
Total			17	0	1	0	9	2	1	0	28	2

== Reserves performance ==
Last Updated: 25 February 2019.

Club performance			League		Total	
Season	Club	League	Apps	Goals	Apps	Goals
Japan			League		Total	
2016	FC Tokyo U-23	J3 League	4	1	4	1
2018	FC Tokyo U-23	J3 League	22	9	22	9
2019	FC Tokyo U-23	J3 League	12	4	12	4
Career total			38	14	38	14
