= Akihiro Hayashi =

Japanese footballer

Akihiro Hayashi 林 彰洋
Personal information
- Full name: Akihiro Hayashi
- Date of birth: May 7, 1987 (age 39)
- Place of birth: Higashiyamato, Tokyo, Japan
- Height: 1.95 m (6 ft 5 in)
- Position: Goalkeeper

Team information
- Current team: Vegalta Sendai
- Number: 33

Youth career
- 2003–2005: RKU Kashiwa High School

Senior career*
Years	Team	Apps	(Gls)
2006–2009	Ryutsu Keizai University	23	(0)
2009–2010	Plymouth Argyle	0	(0)
2010–2012	Olympic Charleroi	10	(0)
2012–2013	Shimizu S-Pulse	40	(0)
2013–2016	Sagan Tosu	104	(0)
2017–2022	FC Tokyo	115	(0)
2023–	Vegalta Sendai	126	(0)

International career
2007	Japan U-20	3	(0)
2012–2017	Japan	0	(0)
Medal record
Shimizu S-Pulse
Runner-up	J.League Cup	2012
FC Tokyo
Runner-up	J1 League	2019
Representing Japan
AFC U-19 Championship
Silver medal – second place	2006 India
- * Club domestic league appearances and goals as of 17 August 2026

Akihiro Hayashi (林 彰洋, Hayashi Akihiro; born May 7, 1987 in Tokyo, Japan) is a Japanese football player who plays for Vegalta Sendai of the J2 League as a goalkeeper.

== International career ==
In July 2007, Hayashi was elected Japan U-20 national team for 2007 U-20 World Cup. At this tournament, he played 3 matches.

Hayashi was called up by then coach Vahid Halilhodžić for the 2018 FIFA World Cup qualifiers against Singapore and Cambodia in November 2015.

== Career statistics ==
Updated to 26 November 2022.

Club performance			League		Cup		League Cup		Continental		Total	
Season	Club	League	Apps	Goals	Apps	Goals	Apps	Goals	Apps	Goals	Apps	Goals
Japan			League		Emperor's Cup		J. League Cup		Asia		Total	
2006	Ryutsu Keizai; University FC	JFL	8	0	1	0	–		–		9	0
2007	Ryutsu Keizai; University FC	JFL	4	0	0	0	–		–		0	0
2008	Ryutsu Keizai; University FC	JFL	10	0	0	0	–		–		10	0
2009	Ryutsu Keizai; University FC	JFL	1	0	0	0	–		–		1	0
2008–09	Astra Giurgiu	Liga II	0	0	–		–		–		0	0
2009-10	Plymouth Argyle	Championship	0	0	–		–		–		0	0
2010-11	Olympic Charleroi	Derde klasse	10	0	–		–		–		10	0
2011-12	Olympic Charleroi	Derde klasse	0	0	–		–		–		0	0
2012	Shimizu S-Pulse	J1 League	26	0	1	0	2	0	–		29	0
2013	Shimizu S-Pulse	J1 League	14	0	–		0	0	–		14	0
2013	Sagan Tosu	J1 League	13	0	5	0	–		–		18	0
2014	Sagan Tosu	J1 League	34	0	3	0	5	0	–		42	0
2015	Sagan Tosu	J1 League	23	0	3	0	4	0	–		30	0
2016	Sagan Tosu	J1 League	34	0	2	0	3	0	–		39	0
2017	FC Tokyo	J1 League	27	0	0	0	8	0	–		35	0
2018	FC Tokyo	J1 League	31	0	2	0	3	0	–		36	0
2019	FC Tokyo	J1 League	34	0	1	0	8	0	–		43	0
2020	FC Tokyo	J1 League	23	0	–		2	0	3	0	28	0
2021	FC Tokyo	J1 League	0	0	0	0	0	0	–		0	0
2022	FC Tokyo	J1 League	0	0	0	0	0	0	–		0	0
2023	Vegalta Sendai	J2 League					–		–			
Country	Japan		272	0	18	0	35	0	3	0	328	0
Country	Romania		0	0	–		–		–		0	0
Country	England		0	0	–		–		–		0	0
Country	Belgium		10	0	–		–		–		10	0
Total			272	0	18	0	35	0	3	0	338	0

== Honours ==
Individual

- J.League Best XI: 2019
