= Rei Hirakawa =

Japanese footballer

Rei Hirakawa 平川 怜
Personal information
- Full name: Rei Hirakawa 平川 怜
- Date of birth: 20 April 2000 (age 26)
- Place of birth: Tokyo, Japan
- Height: 1.74 m (5 ft 8 1/2 in)
- Position: Midfielder

Team information
- Current team: Tokyo Verdy
- Number: 16

Youth career
- Uenohara SC
- 2013–2017: FC Tokyo

Senior career*
Years	Team	Apps	(Gls)
2016–2018	FC Tokyo U-23	40	(3)
2016–2022	FC Tokyo	6	(0)
2019	→ Kagoshima United (loan)	7	(0)
2021	→ Montedio Yamagata (loan)	19	(0)
2022–2023	Roasso Kumamoto	52	(9)
2024	Júbilo Iwata	26	(0)
2025–	Tokyo Verdy	54	(0)

International career
2016	Japan U16		
2017	Japan U17	12	(0)
2018	Japan U18	1	(1)
2018	Japan U19		
2019	Japan U20	2	(1)
- * Club domestic league appearances and goals as of 8 August 2026

Rei Hirakawa (平川 怜, Hirakawa Rei; born 20 April 2000) is a Japanese professional footballer who plays as a midfielder for J1 League club Tokyo Verdy.

== Career ==
Rei Hirakawa joined FC Tokyo in 2016. On October 30, he debuted in J3 League (v SC Sagamihara).

== Career statistics ==
As of end of 2024 season

Appearances and goals by club, season and competition
Club	Season	League			National cup		League cup		Other		Total	
Club	Season	Division	Apps	Goals	Apps	Goals	Apps	Goals	Apps	Goals	Apps	Goals
Japan			League		Emperor's Cup		J. League Cup		Other		Total	
FC Tokyo U-23	2016	J3 League	2	0	—		—		—		2	0
FC Tokyo U-23	2017	J3 League	17	1	—		—		—		17	1
FC Tokyo U-23	2018	J3 League	21	2	—		—		—		21	2
FC Tokyo U-23	Total		40	3	0	0	0	0	0	0	40	3
FC Tokyo	2017	J1 League	1	0	0	0	0	0	—		1	0
FC Tokyo	2018	J1 League	1	0	1	0	0	0	—		2	0
FC Tokyo	2019	J1 League	1	0	0	0	4	0	—		5	0
FC Tokyo	2020	J1 League	3	0	0	0	0	0	—		3	0
FC Tokyo	2022	J1 League	0	0	0	0	4	0	—		4	0
FC Tokyo	Total		6	0	1	0	8	0	0	0	15	0
Kagoshima United (loan)	2019	J2 League	7	0	0	0	—		—		7	0
Montedio Yamagata (loan)	2021	J2 League	19	0	1	0	—		—		20	0
Roasso Kumamoto	2022	J2 League	11	2	0	0	—		3 (Note: Appearances in J1/J2 play-offs)	0	14	2
Roasso Kumamoto	2023	J2 League	41	7	5	2	—		—		46	9
Roasso Kumamoto	Total		52	9	5	2	0	0	0	0	60	11
Júbilo Iwata	2024	J1 League	26	0	0	0	0	0	—		26	0
Career total			150	12	7	2	8	0	3	0	168	14

== Honours ==
Individual

- J2 League Best XI: 2023
