= Yoshitake Suzuki =

Japanese footballer

Yoshitake Suzuki 鈴木 喜丈
Personal information
- Full name: Yoshitake Suzuki
- Date of birth: July 6, 1998 (age 28)
- Place of birth: Kokubunji, Tokyo, Japan
- Height: 1.82 m (5 ft 11 1/2 in)
- Position: Midfielder

Team information
- Current team: Fagiano Okayama
- Number: 43

Youth career
- –2010: Sekimae SC
- 2011–2016: FC Tokyo

Senior career*
| Years | Team | Apps | (Gls) |
| 2016–2018 | → FC Tokyo U-23 (loan) | 61 | (0) |
| 2017–2021 | FC Tokyo | 0 | (0) |
| 2020–2021 | → Mito HollyHock (loan) | 45 | (1) |
| 2022 | Mito HollyHock | 36 | (0) |
| 2023– | Fagiano Okayama | 88 | (6) |
- * Club domestic league appearances and goals as of 12 August 2026

Yoshitake Suzuki (鈴木 喜丈, Suzuki Yoshitake; born July 6, 1998) is a Japanese football player. He plays for Fagiano Okayama.

== Career ==
Yoshitake Suzuki joined FC Tokyo in 2016. On March 13, he debuted in J3 League (v SC Sagamihara).

== Club statistics ==
Updated to 25 February 2019.

| Club performance | | | League | | Cup | | Total | |
| Season | Club | League | Apps | Goals | Apps | Goals | Apps | Goals |
| Japan | | | League | | Emperor's Cup | | Total | |
|---|---|---|---|---|---|---|---|---|
| 2016 | FC Tokyo U-23 | J3 League | 25 | 0 | – | | 25 | 0 |
| 2017 | FC Tokyo U-23 | J3 League | 31 | 0 | – | | 31 | 0 |
| 2018 | FC Tokyo U-23 | J3 League | 5 | 0 | – | | 5 | 0 |
| Total | | | 61 | 0 | 0 | 0 | 61 | 0 |
