= 2020 J.League Cup =

2020 JリーグYBCルヴァンカップ

Tournament details
- Country: Japan
- Dates: 16 February 2020 – 4 January 2021
- Teams: 16 (group stage); 19 (total)

Final positions
- Champions: FC Tokyo (3rd title)
- Runners-up: Kashiwa Reysol

Tournament statistics
- Top goal scorer: Yu Kobayashi (4 goals)

The 2020 J.League Cup, known as the 2020 J.League YBC Levain Cup (Japanese: 2020 JリーグYBCルヴァンカップ) for sponsorship reasons, was the 28th edition of J.League Cup, a Japanese association football cup competition. It began on 16 February 2020 and ended on 4 January 2021.

== Format ==
All 18 teams playing in the 2020 J1 League participated. In addition, depending on the result of the 2020 AFC Champions League qualifying play-offs, one or two teams from 2020 J2 League with the best performance in the previous season (i.e. Matsumoto Yamaga and Júbilo Iwata, the 17th- and 18th-placed teams in 2019 J1 League, respectively) may participate. As FC Tokyo qualified for the AFC Champions League group stage, only Matsumoto Yamaga were invited.

=== Group stage ===
Participants of 2020 AFC Champions League group stage received byes for the group stage.

- Yokohama F. Marinos, Vissel Kobe, and FC Tokyo received byes for the group stage.
- As FC Tokyo qualified for the AFC Champions League group stage, Matsumoto Yamaga were invited for the J. League Cup group stage.

Sixteen teams played the group stage. They were divided into four groups of four teams by their finish on the 2019 J1 and J2 Leagues (parenthesized below).

- Group A: Kashima Antlers (J1 3rd), Kawasaki Frontale (J1 4th), Shimizu S-Pulse (J1 12th), Nagoya Grampus (J1 13th).
- Group B: Cerezo Osaka (J1 5th), Vegalta Sendai (J1 11th), Urawa Red Diamonds (J1 14th), Matsumoto Yamaga (J1 17th).
- Group C: Sanfrecce Hiroshima (J1 6th), Hokkaido Consadole Sapporo (J1 10th), Sagan Tosu (J1 15th), Yokohama FC (J2 2nd).
- Group D: Gamba Osaka (J1 7th), Oita Trinita (J1 9th), Shonan Bellmare (J1 16th), Kashiwa Reysol (J2 1st).

Each group was played on a home-and-away round-robin basis. Each match would be played in 90 minutes.

==== Group stage tiebreakers ====
In the group stage, teams in a group were ranked by points (3 points for a win, 1 point for a draw, 0 points for a loss). If the points were tied, the following tiebreakers were applied:

1. Points in head-to-head matches among tied teams;
2. Goal difference in head-to-head matches among tied teams;
3. Goals scored in head-to-head matches among tied teams;
4. Away goals scored in head-to-head matches among tied teams;
5. If more than two teams are tied, and applying all head-to-head criteria above remains a part of teams still tied, reapply the criteria above only for the tied teams.
6. Goal difference in all group matches;
7. Goals scored in all group matches;
8. Penalty shoot-out if only two teams are tied and they met in the last round of the group;
9. Fewer disciplinary points;
10. Drawing of lots.

In case of ranking third-placed teams across the groups, the following criteria were used:

1. Points;
2. Goal difference in all group matches;
3. Goals scored in all group matches;
4. Fewer disciplinary points;
5. Drawing of lots.

=== Play-off stage ===
The number of play-off stage participants depends on the number of teams advanced to ACL group stage.

- In case four teams advanced to ACL group stage, eight teams (top two teams in each group) would play the play-off.
- In case three teams advanced to ACL group stage, ten teams (top two teams in each group, and two best third-placed teams across the groups) would play the play-off.
- In case two teams advanced to ACL group stage, twelve teams (top three teams in each group) would play the play-off.

The play-off stage was played as two-legged ties of two teams each. The away goals rule, an extra time (away goals rule is not applied for the scores in the extra time), and a penalty shoot-out were used if needed.

=== Prime stage (Knockout stage) ===
The prime stage (knockout stage) was played by 8 teams who advanced to ACL group stage and won the play-off stage.

The quarter-finals and the semi-finals were played as two-legged ties (same as the play-off stage). The final was a single game.

The video assistant referee (VAR) system would be used during this stage.

=== Regulation changes ===
Due to the COVID-19 pandemic, the extraordinary board held a meeting on 5 June 2020 to change the tournament method as follows:

- The U-21 starting rules (including one or more Japanese nationals aged 21 or younger on 31 December 2020 as starters) are not applied to all matches.
- The group stage was changed from the previous "Double round-robin" (six games for each team) to "Single round-robin" (three games for each team), with the combination as it was. The results of matchday 1 of the group stage remained valid.
- The playoff stage was cancelled, and the best runners-up along with four group winners advanced to the prime stage.
- In the prime stage, 8 clubs compete in a one-leg knockout tournament. In addition, extra time will not be played except for the final, instead the match goes straight to penalty shoot-out to determine the winners if tied after 90 minutes in the quarter-finals and semi-finals.

On 23 June, J.League announced that it would not use the video assistant referee (VAR) system.

== Schedule ==
The revised schedule was announced on 15 June 2020.

Stage	Round	Date
Group stage	Matchday 1	16 February 2020
Group stage	Matchday 2	5 August 2020
Group stage	Matchday 3	12 August 2020
Prime stage
Prime stage	Quarter-finals	2 September 2020
Prime stage	Semi-finals	7 October 2020
Prime stage	Final	4 January 2021 (rescheduled from 7 November 2020)

== Group stage ==
=== Group A ===
Pos	Team	Pld	W	D	L	GF	GA	GD	Pts	FRO	GRA	ANT	SSP
1	Kawasaki Frontale	3	2	1	0	10	5	+5	7	—	—	—	5–1
2	Nagoya Grampus	3	2	1	0	6	2	+4	7 (Note: Most points among the 2nd-place finishers in each group.)	2–2	—	1–0	—
3	Kashima Antlers	3	1	0	2	5	6	−1	3	2–3	—	—	—
4	Shimizu S-Pulse	3	0	0	3	3	11	−8	0	—	0–3	2–3	—

Source: Table, Results
Legend: Blue = home team win; Yellow = draw; Red = away team win.

=== Group B ===
Pos	Team	Pld	W	D	L	GF	GA	GD	Pts	CER	RED	VEG	YAM
1	Cerezo Osaka	3	3	0	0	8	1	+7	9	—	1–0	—	4–1
2	Urawa Red Diamonds	2	1	0	1	5	3	+2	6 (Note: Matsumoto Yamaga did not participate in the 2nd and 3rd sections due to a change in regulations, and the 2 matches were declared 0-goal victories for the opposing teams.)	—	—	5–2	RED wins with 0 goal
3	Vegalta Sendai	2	0	0	2	2	8	−6	3	0–3	—	—	VEG wins with 0 goal
4	Matsumoto Yamaga	1	0	0	1	1	4	−3	0	—	—	—	—

Source: Table, Results
Legend: Blue = home team win; Yellow = draw; Red = away team win.

=== Group C ===
Pos	Team	Pld	W	D	L	GF	GA	GD	Pts	CON	SFR	YFC	SAG
1	Hokkaido Consadole Sapporo	3	2	1	0	6	2	+4	7	—	2–1	1–1	—
2	Sanfrecce Hiroshima	2	1	0	1	3	2	+1	4 (Note: Head-to-head points: Sanfrecce Hiroshima 3, Yokohama FC 0.)	—	—	—	cancelled (Note: The match was cancelled after some members of Sagan Tosu were diagnosed with COVID-19. JPFL then decided that no alternative match would be held, and both teams (Sanfrecce Hiroshima and Sagan Tosu) were added 1 point to finalize the standings in accordance with the game's guidelines.)
3	Yokohama FC	3	1	1	1	2	3	−1	4	—	0–2	—	—
4	Sagan Tosu	2	0	0	2	0	4	−4	1	0–3	—	0–1	—

Source: Table, Results
Legend: Blue = home team win; Yellow = draw; Red = away team win.

=== Group D ===
Pos	Team	Pld	W	D	L	GF	GA	GD	Pts	REY	GAM	BEL	TRI
1	Kashiwa Reysol	3	3	0	0	5	1	+4	9	—	—	1–0	3–1
2	Gamba Osaka	3	1	1	1	3	3	0	4	0–1	—	—	—
3	Shonan Bellmare	3	1	0	2	2	3	−1	3	—	1–2	—	1–0
4	Oita Trinita	3	0	1	2	2	5	−3	1	—	1–1	—	—

Source: Table, Results
Legend: Blue = home team win; Yellow = draw; Red = away team win.

== Prime stage (Knockout stage) ==
Prime stage is the single-leg knockout tournament contested between the 5 clubs that qualified from the group stage and the 3 AFC Champions League participants.

The draw for the prime stage took place on 13 August 2020.

Quarter-finals
Hokkaido Consadole Sapporo	1 (4)
Yokohama F. Marinos (p)	1 (5)
Cerezo Osaka	0
Kashiwa Reysol	3
Vissel Kobe	0
Kawasaki Frontale	6
FC Tokyo	3
Nagoya Grampus	0

Semi-finals
Yokohama F. Marinos	0
Kashiwa Reysol	1
Kawasaki Frontale	0
FC Tokyo	2

Final
Kashiwa Reysol	1
FC Tokyo	2

== Quarter finals ==
The matches took place on 2 September 2020.

Team 1	Score	Team 2
Hokkaido Consadole Sapporo	1–1 (4–5 p)	Yokohama F. Marinos
Cerezo Osaka	0–3	Kashiwa Reysol
Vissel Kobe	0–6	Kawasaki Frontale
FC Tokyo	3–0	Nagoya Grampus

== Semi-finals ==
The matches were played on 7 October 2020.

Team 1	Score	Team 2
Yokohama F. Marinos	0–1	Kashiwa Reysol
Kawasaki Frontale	0–2	FC Tokyo

== Final ==
Originally scheduled for 7 November 2020, the final was postponed 3 days prior after 13 of the Kashiwa Reysol club members, including their 70-year-old manager Nelsinho Baptista and three players, were tested positive for COVID-19. It was then scheduled to play on 4 January 2021, three days after the 2020 Emperor's Cup final.

4 January 2021
14:41 JST

Kashiwa Reysol	1–2	FC Tokyo
Segawa 45'	Report	Leandro 16'; Adaílton 74'

National Stadium, Tokyo
Attendance: 24,219
Referee: Koichiro Fukushima

== Top scorers ==
Rank	Player	Club	Goals
1	(Japan) Yu Kobayashi	Kawasaki Frontale	4
2	(Brazil) Leandro	FC Tokyo	3
2	(Japan) Kaoru Mitoma	Kawasaki Frontale	3
2	(Brazil) Bruno Mendes	Cerezo Osaka	3
5	13 players		2

== See also ==
- Japan Football Association (JFA)
- J.League
- 2020 J1 League (I)
- 2020 J2 League (II)
- 2020 J3 League (III)
- 2020 Japan Football League (IV)
- 2020 Japanese Regional Leagues (V/VI)
- 2020 Fuji Xerox Super Cup (Super Cup)
- 2020 Emperor's Cup (National Cup)
