= 2025 Kashiwa Reysol season =

Kashiwa Reysol
2025 season
- Chairman: Ryuichiro Takikawa
- Manager: Ricardo Rodríguez
- Stadium: Sankyo Frontier Kashiwa Stadium ("Hitachidai"); Kashiwa, Chiba
- Average home league attendance: 13,017
Home colours	Away colours
- All statistics correct as of 19 April 2025.

The 2025 Kashiwa Reysol season is the club's 85th season in existence and the 6th consecutive season in the top flight of Japanese football. In addition to the domestic league, Yokohama F. Marinos are participating in this season's editions of the Emperor's Cup, the J.League Cup.

== Squad ==
No.	Name	Nationality	Date of birth (age)	Previous club	Contract since	Contract end
Goalkeepers
1	Haruki Saruta	(Japan)	23 April 1999 (age 26)	(Japan) Yokohama FC	2018	
25	Ryosuke Kojima	(Japan)	30 January 1997 (age 29)	(Japan) Albirex Niigata	2025	
29	Kengo Nagai	(Japan)	6 November 1994 (age 31)	(Japan) Tokushima Vortis	2025	
41	Daiki Sakata	(Japan)	11 September 1994 (age 31)	(Japan) Avispa Fukuoka	2025	
46	Kenta Matsumoto	(Japan)	4 May 1997 (age 28)	(Japan) Omiya Ardija	2020	
Defenders
2	Hiromu Mitsumaru	(Japan)	6 July 1993 (age 32)	(Japan) Sagan Tosu	2020	
3	Diego	(Brazil)	21 September 1995 (age 30)	(Japan) Sagan Tosu	2023	
4	Taiyo Koga	(Japan)	28 October 1998 (age 27)	(Japan) Avispa Fukuoka	2017	
5	Hayato Tanaka	(Japan)	1 November 2003 (age 22)	(Japan) V-Varen Nagasaki	2021	
13	Tomoya Inukai	(Japan)	12 May 1993 (age 32)	(Japan) Urawa Red Diamonds	2024	
16	Eiichi Katayama	(Japan)	30 November 1991 (age 34)	(Japan) Shimizu S-Pulse	2023	
22	Hiroki Noda	(Japan)	27 July 1997 (age 28)	(Japan) Montedio Yamagata	2024	
26	Daiki Sugioka	(Japan)	8 September 1998 (age 27)	(Japan) Machida Zelvia	2025	
42	Wataru Harada	(Japan)	22 July 1996 (age 29)	(Japan) Sagan Tosu	2025	
88	Seiya Baba	(Japan)	24 October 2001 (age 24)	(Japan) Hokkaido Consadole Sapporo	2025	
Midfielders
6	Yuto Yamada	(Japan)	17 May 2000 (age 25)	(Japan) Tochigi SC	2019	
8	Yoshio Koizumi	(Japan)	5 October 1996 (age 29)	(Japan) Urawa Red Diamonds	2025	
11	Masaki Watai	(Japan)	18 July 1999 (age 26)	(Portugal) Boavista	2025	
14	Tomoya Koyamatsu	(Japan)	24 April 1995 (age 30)	(Japan) Sagan Tosu	2022	
17	Kohei Tezuka	(Japan)	6 April 1996 (age 29)	(Japan) Sagan Tosu	2024	
19	Hayato Nakama	(Japan)	16 May 1992 (age 33)	(Japan) Kashima Antlers	2025	
20	Yusuke Segawa	(Japan)	7 February 1994 (age 32)	(Japan) Kawasaki Frontale	2025	
21	Yudai Konishi	(Japan)	18 April 1998 (age 27)	(Japan) Montedio Yamagata	2025	
24	Tojiro Kubo	(Japan)	5 April 1999 (age 26)	(Japan) Sagan Tosu	2025	
27	Koki Kumasaka	(Japan)	15 April 2001 (age 24)	(Japan) Tokyo International University	2025	
28	Sachiro Toshima	(Japan)	26 September 1995 (age 30)	(Japan) Albirex Niigata	2020	
40	Riki Harakawa	(Japan)	18 August 1993 (age 32)	(Japan) FC Tokyo	2025	
Strikers
9	Mao Hosoya	(Japan)	17 September 2001 (age 24)	Youth Team	2019	
15	Yōta Komi	(Japan)	11 August 2002 (age 23)	(Japan) Albirex Niigata	2025	
18	Yuki Kakita	(Japan)	14 July 1997 (age 28)	(Japan) Kashima Antlers	2025	
Players who are on loan to other club
	Masato Sasaki (G)	(Japan)	1 May 2002 (age 23)	(Japan) Fagiano Okayama	2021	
	Naoki Kawaguchi (D)	(Japan)	24 May 1994 (age 31)	(Japan) Albirex Niigata	2019	
	Takuya Shimamura (M)	(Japan)	6 March 1999 (age 26)	(Japan) Roasso Kumamoto	2023	
	Takumi Tsuchiya (M)	(Japan)	25 October 2003 (age 22)	(Japan) NSSU Kashiwa High School	2022	
	Fumiya Unoki (M)	(Japan)	4 July 2001 (age 24)	(Japan) Mito HollyHock	2019	
	Takuto Kato (F)	(Japan)	9 May 1999 (age 26)	(Japan) Fukushima United	2021	
	Owie William (F)	(Japan)	19 April 2004 (age 21)	(Japan)	2024	
	Ota Yamamoto (F)	(Japan)	4 June 2004 (age 21)	(Japan)	2024	
	Mohamad Sadiki Wade (F)	(Japan)	29 May 2006 (age 19)	Youth Team	2025	
Players who left during mid-season

== Club officials ==
Club staff 2025

Position	Name
Manager	(Spain) Ricardo Rodríguez
Assistant manager	(Japan) Ryoichi Kurisawa
Coaches	(Japan) Hidekazu Otani (Japan) Yuta Someya
Coaches & Physical coach	(Japan) Naoya Matsubara
Goalkeeping coach	(Japan) Keita Inoue
Technical	(Japan) Yasushi Okamura
Doctor	(Japan) Kojiro Hyodo
Medical	(Japan) Kaoru Arakawa (Japan) Hiroyuki Akai (Japan) Toshiya Itagaki (Japan) Hisao Iwaki (Brazil) Fabiano
Interpreter	(Japan) Isao Yakita (Japan) Masayoshi Edson Hayakawa (Japan) Michinori Katsuta
Scout and support coach	(South Korea) Lee Chang-won
Equipment	(Japan) Masafumi Kimura
Competent	(Japan) Takumi Miyamoto

== Transfers ==
=== Pre-season ===
==== In ====
Transfers in

Date	Position	Player	Transferred from	Ref
Permanent Transfer
20 January 2025	GK	(Japan) Daiki Sakata	(Japan) Avispa Fukuoka	Free
20 January 2025	GK	(Japan) Ryosuke Kojima	(Japan) Albirex Niigata	Free
20 January 2025	DF	(Japan) Wataru Harada	(Japan) Sagan Tosu	Free
20 January 2025	MF	(Japan) Riki Harakawa	(Japan) FC Tokyo	Free
20 January 2025	MF	(Japan) Yoshio Koizumi	(Japan) Urawa Red Diamonds	Free
20 January 2025	MF	(Japan) Masaki Watai	(Japan) Tokushima Vortis	Free
20 January 2025	MF	(Japan) Hayato Nakama	(Japan) Kashima Antlers	Free
1 February 2025	DF	(Japan) Daiki Sugioka	(Japan) Shonan Bellmare	Free
1 February 2025	DF	(Japan) Taisei Kuwata	(Japan) Chukyo University	Free
1 February 2025	MF	(Japan) Tojiro Kubo	(Japan) Nagoya Grampus	Free
1 February 2025	MF	(Japan) Shun Nakajima	(Japan) Ryutsu Keizai University	Free
1 February 2025	MF	(Japan) Nobuteru Nakagawa	(Japan) Hosei University	Free
1 February 2025	FW	(Japan) Nabel Yoshitaka Furusawa	(Japan) Tokyo International University	Free
1 February 2025	FW	(Japan) Mohamad Sadiki Wade	Youth Team	Promoted
8 February 2025	DF	(Japan) Shumpei Naruse	(Japan) Nagoya Grampus	Free
Loan Transfer
31 January 2025	DF	(Japan) Riku Ochiai	(Japan) Mito HollyHock	Loan Return
31 January 2025	DF	(Japan) Hayato Tanaka	(Japan) V-Varen Nagasaki	Loan Return
31 January 2025	DF	(Japan) Wataru Iwashita	(Japan) Roasso Kumamoto	Loan Return
31 January 2025	MF	(Japan) Takuto Kato	(Japan) Fukushima United	Loan Return
31 January 2025	FW	(Japan) Ota Yamamoto	(Japan) Tochigi SC	Loan Return

==== Out ====
Transfers out

Date	Position	Player	Transferred To	Ref
Permanent Transfer
2 January 2025	DF	(Netherlands) (Suriname) Jay-Roy Grot	(Denmark) Odense Boldklub	Free
12 January 2025	DF	(Japan) Hiroki Sekine	(France) Reims	Undisclosed
20 January 2025	GK	(Japan) Tatsuya Morita	(Japan) FC Machida Zelvia	Free
20 January 2025	DF	(Japan) Yugo Tatsuta	(Japan) Fagiano Okayama	Free
20 January 2025	MF	(Brazil) Matheus Savio	(Japan) Urawa Red Diamonds	Free
1 February 2025	DF	(Japan) Riku Ochiai	(Japan) Albirex Niigata	Free
1 February 2025	DF	(Japan) Wataru Iwashita	(Japan) Roasso Kumamoto	Free
1 February 2025	MF	(Japan) Takuto Kato	(Japan) Tegevajaro Miyazaki	Free
13 February 2025	DF	(Japan) Yugo Masukake	(Brazil) Maringá	Undisclosed
Loan Transfer
1 February 2025	GK	(Japan) Masato Sasaki	(Japan) Fagiano Okayama	Season loan
1 February 2025	DF	(Japan) Naoki Kawaguchi	(Japan) Júbilo Iwata	Season loan
1 February 2025	MF	(Japan) Takumi Tsuchiya	(Japan) Ventforet Kofu	Season loan
1 February 2025	MF	(Japan) Fumiya Unoki	(Japan) Iwaki FC	Season loan
1 February 2025	FW	(Japan) Ota Yamamoto	(Japan) Renofa Yamaguchi FC	Season loan
1 February 2025	FW	(Japan) William Owie	(Japan) FC Gifu	Season loan
2 February 2025	FW	(Japan) Mohamad Sadiki Wade	(Japan) FC Ryukyu	Season loan

=== Mid-season ===
==== In ====
Transfers in

Date	Position	Player	Transferred from	Ref
Permanent Transfer
7 June 2025	MF	(Japan) Yusuke Segawa	(Japan) Kawasaki Frontale	Undisclosed
8 June 2025	DF	(Japan) Seiya Baba	(Japan) Hokkaido Consadole Sapporo	Free
8 June 2025	FW	(Japan) Yōta Komi	(Japan) Albirex Niigata	Free
25 July 2025	MF	(Japan) Yudai Konishi	(Japan) Montedio Yamagata	Undisclosed
20 August 2025	GK	(Japan) Kengo Nagai	(Japan) Tokushima Vortis	Undisclosed
Loan Transfer
6 May 2025	GK	(Japan) Masato Sasaki	(Japan) Fagiano Okayama	End of loan (Note: Sasaki loan terminated early and he joined Iwaki FC 2 months later.)

==== Out ====
Transfers out

Date	Position	Player	Transferred To	Ref
Permanent Transfer
2 June 2025	FW	(Japan) Kosuke Kinoshita	(Japan) Sanfrecce Hiroshima	Undisclosed
16 July 2025	MF	(Japan) Eiji Shirai	(Japan) Albirex Niigata	Free
Loan Transfer
25 June 2025	MF	(Japan) (India) Mohammad Farzan Sana	(Japan) Thespa Gunma	Season loan
6 July 2025	GK	(Japan) Masato Sasaki	(Japan) Iwaki FC	Season loan
15 July 2025	MF	(Japan) Takuya Shimamura	(Japan) Albirex Niigata	Season loan

== Friendly ==
=== Pre-season ===
Win Draw Loss

== Competitions ==
=== J1 League ===
Pos	Team	Pld	W	D	L	GF	GA	GD	Pts	Qualification or relegation
1	Kashima Antlers (C)	38	23	7	8	58	31	+27	76	Qualification for the AFC Champions League Elite league stage
2	Kashiwa Reysol	38	21	12	5	60	34	+26	75	Qualification for the AFC Champions League Elite league stage
3	Kyoto Sanga	38	19	11	8	62	40	+22	68	
4	Sanfrecce Hiroshima	38	20	8	10	46	28	+18	68	
5	Vissel Kobe	38	18	10	10	46	33	+13	64	

Source: JLeague.co, JLeague.jp, J.League Data Site
Rules for classification: 1) Points; 2) Goal difference; 3) Goals scored; 4) Head-to-head points; 5) Head-to-head goal difference; 6) Head-to-head goals scored; 7) Fewer disciplinary points.
(C) Champions

15 February 1	Avispa Fukuoka	0–1	Kashiwa Reysol	Fukuoka
	Masaya Tashiro (yellow card) 37'; Takumi Kamijima (yellow card) 55'; Takaaki Shichi (yellow card) 24' (yellow-red card) 85'	Report	Diego 75'	Stadium: Best Denki Stadium; Attendance: 9,923; Referee: Koei Koya

22 February 2	Kashiwa Reysol	1–1	Kawasaki Frontale	Chiba
	Yoshio Koizumi 57'; Yuki Kakita (yellow card) 85'	Report	Yasuto Wakizaka 50'	Stadium: Sankyo Frontier Kashiwa Stadium; Attendance: 13,695; Referee: Koichiro Fukushima

22 February 3	Kashiwa Reysol	2–1	Cerezo Osaka	Chiba
	Yuki Kakita 66'; Kosuke Kinoshita 74'; Wataru Harada (yellow card) 36'; Diego (yellow card) 88'	Report	Sota Kitano 13'; Hiroaki Okuno (yellow card) 90'	Stadium: Sankyo Frontier Kashiwa Stadium; Attendance: 8,946; Referee: Masuya Ueda

2 March 4	Urawa Red Diamonds	0–2	Kashiwa Reysol	Saitama
		Report	Tomoya Koyamatsu 14'; Yuki Kakita 31'; Yoshio Koizumi (yellow card) 73'	Stadium: Saitama Stadium 2002; Attendance: 51,009; Referee: Nathan Verboomen (Belgium)

8 March 5	Kashiwa Reysol	1–3	Kashima Antlers	Chiba
	Tojiro Kubo 57'; Koki Kumasaka (yellow card) 56'	Report	Léo Ceará 26', 50', 62'; Yuta Higuchi (yellow card) 69'	Stadium: Sankyo Frontier Kashiwa Stadium; Attendance: 13,309; Referee: Takafumi Mikuriya

16 March 6	Sanfrecce Hiroshima	1–1	Kashiwa Reysol	Hiroshima
	Shunki Higashi 72'; Sho Sasaki (yellow card) 66'	Report	Mao Hosoya 86'; Yoshio Koizumi (yellow card) 45+3'; Riki Harakawa (yellow card) 83'	Stadium: Edion Peace Wing Hiroshima; Attendance: 25,283; Referee: Koki Nagamine

29 March 7	Kashiwa Reysol	0–0	Tokyo Verdy	Chiba
	Riki Harakawa (yellow card) 35'	Report	Yudai Kimura (yellow card) 90+3'	Stadium: Sankyo Frontier Kashiwa Stadium; Attendance: 11,888; Referee: Ryo Tanimoto

2 April 8	Kyoto Sanga	1–1	Kashiwa Reysol	Kyoto
	Yuma Suzuki 90+6' (o.g.); Shimpei Fukuoka (yellow card) 75'; Joao Pedro (yellow card) 81'	Report	Tojiro Kubo 12'; Taiyo Koga (yellow card) 29'; Koki Kumasaka (yellow card) 90+2'; Ryosuke Kojima (yellow card) 90+4'	Stadium: Sanga Stadium by Kyocera; Attendance: 9,059; Referee: Hayato Shimizu

6 April 9	Kashiwa Reysol	1–0	Gamba Osaka	Chiba
	Yoshio Koizumi 65'	Report	Neta Lavi (yellow card) 31'; Issam Jebali (yellow card) 37'	Stadium: Sankyo Frontier Kashiwa Stadium; Attendance: 12,833; Referee: Koei Koya

11 April 10	FC Tokyo	1–1	Kashiwa Reysol	Chōfu
	Teruhito Nakagawa 35'; Taishi Brandon Nozawa (yellow card) 90'	Report	Kosuke Kinoshita 90+4'; Yuto Yamada (yellow card) 60'; Yoshio Koizumi (yellow card) 80'; Wataru Harada (yellow card) 82'	Stadium: Ajinomoto Stadium; Attendance: 43,813; Referee: Hiroyuki Kimura

20 April 11	Shonan Bellmare	0–1	Kashiwa Reysol	Hiratsuka
	Kosuke Onose (yellow card) 27'	Report	Yuki Kakita 52'; Yuto Yamada (yellow card) 48'	Stadium: Lemon Gas Stadium Hiratsuka; Attendance: 11,936; Referee: Yusuke Ohashi

26 April 12	Kashiwa Reysol	1–1	Albirex Niigata	Chiba
	Masaki Watai 32'; Shumpei Naruse (yellow card) 12'	Report	Yota Komi 14' (pen.)	Stadium: Sankyo Frontier Kashiwa Stadium; Attendance: 13,030; Referee: Takafumi Mikuriya

29 April 13	Nagoya Grampus	1–2	Kashiwa Reysol	Toyota
	Sho Inagaki 2'	Report	Yuto Yamada 33'; Mao Hosoya 50'; Diego (yellow card) 45'; Hiromu Mitsumaru (yellow card) 87'	Stadium: Toyota Stadium; Attendance: 34,151; Referee: Masuya Ueda

14 May 14 (Rescheduled)	Yokohama F. Marinos	0–2	Kashiwa Reysol	Yokohama
	Kosei Suwama (yellow card) 73'; Takuya Kida (yellow card) 90'	Report	Yoshio Koizumi 56'; Kosuke Kinoshita 90+1'	Stadium: Nissan Stadium; Attendance: 14,513; Referee: Koki Nagamine

6 May 15	Kashiwa Reysol	1–0	Shimizu S-Pulse	Chiba
	Yuki Kakita 52'; Tomoya Inukai (yellow card) 31'; Yuto Yamada (yellow card) 75'	Report	Zento Uno (yellow card) 19'	Stadium: Sankyo Frontier Kashiwa Stadium; Attendance: 11,747; Referee: Shu Kawamata

10 May 16	Kashiwa Reysol	2–0	Fagiano Okayama	Chiba
	Mao Hosaya 76'; Diego 90'; Koki Kumasaka (yellow card) 74'	Report	Ibuki Fujita (yellow card) 67'	Stadium: Sankyo Frontier Kashiwa Stadium; Attendance: 12,414; Referee: Jumpei Ilda

17 May 17	Machida Zelvia	3–0	Kashiwa Reysol	Tokyo
	Kotaro Hayashi 4' (yellow card) 35'; Taiyo Koga 15' (o.g.); Na Sang-ho 45' (pen.)	Report		Stadium: Japan National Stadium; Attendance: 8,741; Referee: Akihiko Ikeuchi

25 May 18	Yokohama FC	1–1	Kashiwa Reysol	Yokohama
	Musahi Suzuki 19'; Yuri Lara (yellow card) 83'	Report	Mao Hosoya 32'; Taiyo Koga (yellow card) 43'; Koki Kumasaka (yellow card) 45+1'	Stadium: Mitsuzawa Stadium; Attendance: 8,779; Referee: Yoshiro Imamura

31 May 19	Kashiwa Reysol	1–3	Vissel Kobe	Chiba
	Wataru Harada 26'; Hayato Tanaka (yellow card) 67'	Report	Matheus Thuler 19'; Takahiro Ogihara 40' (yellow card) 29'; Daiju Sasaki 90+7'; Tetsushi Yamakawa (yellow card) 70'; Haruya Ide (yellow card) 89'	Stadium: Sankyo Frontier Kashiwa Stadium; Attendance: 12,989; Referee: Yusuke Araki

15 June 20	Tokyo Verdy	0–3	Kashiwa Reysol	Chōfu
		Report	Tojiro Kubo 27'; Yoshio Koizumi 41'; Mao Hosoya 90+3'	Stadium: Ajinomoto Stadium; Attendance: 15,375; Referee: Koichiro Fukushima

21 June 21	Kashiwa Reysol	3–3	Kyoto Sanga	Chiba
	Yoshio Koizumi 19'; Yuki Kakita 31' (yellow card) 46'; Wataru Harada 74'; Yuto Yamada (yellow card) 38'	Report	Takuji Yonemoto 24'; Shun Nagasawa 53'; Sota Kawasaki 84'; Tetsushi Yamakawa (yellow card) 70'; Haruya Ide (yellow card) 89'	Stadium: Sankyo Frontier Kashiwa Stadium; Attendance: 12,954; Referee: Futoshi Nakamura

28 June 22	Shimizu S-Pulse	0–2	Kashiwa Reysol	Shizuoka
	Capixaba (yellow card) 78'; Matheus Bueno (yellow card) 88'	Report	Tojiro Kubo 8'; Sachiro Toshima 23'; Nobuteru Nakagawa (yellow card) 10'; Wataru Harada (yellow card) 56'	Stadium: IAI Stadium Nihondaira; Attendance: 18,159; Referee: Keigo Sendachi

5 July 23	Kashiwa Reysol	1–0	FC Tokyo	Chiba
	Tojiro Kubo 73'; Yuto Yamada (yellow card) 54'; Diego (yellow card) 88'	Report	Tsutomu Yasuno (yellow card) 36'; Teruhito Nakagawa (yellow card) 45+2'	Stadium: Sankyo Frontier Kashiwa Stadium; Attendance: 13,447; Referee: Koki Nagamine

20 July 24	Kashima Antlers	3–2	Kashiwa Reysol	Tokyo
	Léo Ceará 5'; Naomichi Ueda 39'; Yuta Matsumura 90+4'; Makoto Tanaka (yellow card) 65'; Yuta Nono (yellow card) 90+5'	Report	Tomoya Koyamatsu 43' (yellow card) 41'; Yusuke Segawa 75'; Wataru Harada (yellow card) 36'; Nobuteru Nakagawa (yellow card) 71'	Stadium: Japan National Stadium; Attendance: 33,400; Referee: Hiroyuki Kimura

10 August 25	Kashiwa Reysol	2–0	Shonan Bellmare	Chiba
	Tomoya Koyamatsu 44'; Nobuteru Nakagawa 90'; Seiya Baba (yellow card) 25'; Mao Hosoya (yellow card) 87'	Report		Stadium: Sankyo Frontier Kashiwa Stadium; Attendance: 14,048; Referee: Shu Kawamata

17 August 26	Fagiano Okayama	2–1	Kashiwa Reysol	Okayama
	Hiroto Iwabuchi 4'; Lucão 90'	Report	Hayato Nakama 90+5'; Yuki Kakita (yellow card) 28'	Stadium: City Light Stadium; Attendance: 15,421; Referee: Naoto Uehara

22 August 27	Kashiwa Reysol	4–2	Urawa Red Diamonds	Chiba
	Yusuke Segawa 54'; Mao Hosoya 84'; Yudai Konishi 90'; Tojiro Kubo 90+5'	Report	Yoichi Naganuma 5'; Yūsuke Matsuo 43'; Hirokazu Ishihara (yellow card) 29'; Shūsaku Nishikawa (yellow card) 39'; Takurō Kaneko (yellow card) 79'	Stadium: Sankyo Frontier Kashiwa Stadium; Attendance: 13,922; Referee: Fu Ming (China PR)

31 August 28	Kashiwa Reysol	2–1	Avispa Fukuoka	Chiba
	Tojiro Kubo 45+5'; Yusuke Segawa 76'; Nobuteru Nakagawa (yellow card) 64'	Report	Takumi Kamijima 34'; Daiki Matsuoka (yellow card) 31'; Yu Hashimoto (yellow card) 36'; Tatsuki Nara (yellow card) 62'; Tomoya Ando (yellow card) 72'	Stadium: Sankyo Frontier Kashiwa Stadium; Attendance: 13,995; Referee: Keigo Sendachi

12 September 29 (Rescheduled)	Vissel Kobe	0–0	Kashiwa Reysol	Kobe
	Yosuke Ideguchi (yellow card) 85'	Report		Stadium: Noevir Stadium Kobe; Attendance: 15,051; Referee: Jumpei Iida

20 September 30	Cerezo Osaka	1–1	Kashiwa Reysol	Osaka
	Lucas Fernandes 41'	Report	Mao Hosoya 25'; Hiromu Mitsumaru (yellow card) 53'	Stadium: Yodoko Sakura Stadium; Attendance: 18,938; Referee: Takafumi Mikuriya

23 September 31	Kashiwa Reysol	0–0	Sanfrecce Hiroshima	Chiba
	Yuto Yamada (yellow card) 44'	Report	Ryo Germain (yellow card) 67'; Michael Skibbe (yellow card) 69'	Stadium: Sankyo Frontier Kashiwa Stadium; Attendance: 13,552; Referee: Ahmed El Shrief (Qatar)

28 September 32	Kawasaki Frontale	4–4	Kashiwa Reysol	Kawasaki
	Lazar Romanić 7' (pen.), 79'; Tatsuya Ito 45+5'; Yasuto Wakizaka 51' (yellow card) 34'; Louis Yamaguchi (yellow card) 49'; Yuki Yamamoto (yellow card) 57'	Report	Yuki Kakita 15'; Diego Jara Rodrigues 39'; Nobuteru Nakagawa 65'; Hiromu Mitsumaru 90' (yellow card) 88'; Daiki Sugioka (yellow card) 6'	Stadium: Kawasaki Todoroki Stadium; Attendance: 21,652; Referee: Koki Nagamine

4 October 33	Kashiwa Reysol	1–0	Yokohama F. Marinos	Chiba
	Yoshio Koizumi 41'; Hayato Nakama (yellow card) 45+2'	Report		Stadium: Sankyo Frontier Kashiwa Stadium; Attendance: 13,884; Referee: Koji Takasaki

18 October 34	Gamba Osaka	0–5	Kashiwa Reysol	Osaka
		Report	Yoshio Koizumi 7'; Nobuteru Nakagawa 15'; Diego 19', 51'; Mao Hosoya 73' (pen.); Riki Harakawa (yellow card) 90+2'	Stadium: Suita City Football Stadium; Attendance: 30,282; Referee: Koichiro Fukushima

25 October 35	Kashiwa Reysol	2–0	Yokohama FC	Chiba
	Yuto Yamada 72'; Hayato Nakama 76'	Report	Jakub Słowik (yellow card) 48'	Stadium: Sankyo Frontier Kashiwa Stadium; Attendance: 12,950; Referee: Akihiko Ikeuchi

8 November 36	Kashiwa Reysol	1–0	Nagoya Grampus	Chiba
	KennedyEgbus Mikuni 47' (o.g.)	Report	Yota Sato (yellow card) 45'	Stadium: Sankyo Frontier Kashiwa Stadium; Attendance: 13,634; Referee: Masuya Ueda

30 November 37	Albirex Niigata	1–3	Kashiwa Reysol	Niigata
	Keisuke Kasai 72'; Eiji Shirai (yellow card) 28'; Michael James (yellow card) 83'	Report	Mao Hosoya 20', 45', 55'	Stadium: Denka Big Swan Stadium; Attendance: 25,346; Referee: Hiroki Kasahara

6 December 38	Kashiwa Reysol	1–0	Machida Zelvia	Chiba
	Daihachi Okamura 63' (o.g.); Hayato Nakama (yellow card) 77'	Report		Stadium: Sankyo Frontier Kashiwa Stadium; Attendance: 14,092; Referee: Koichiro Fukushima

=== J.League Cup ===
The 2025 J.League Cup was expanded so that all 60 J.League clubs would participate.

20 March First round – Match 1	Azul Claro Numazu	0–1	Kashiwa Reysol	Numazu
		Report	Hayato Nakama 8'	Stadium: Ashitaka Park Stadium; Attendance: 4,406; Referee: Atsushi Kamimura

9 April First round – Match 2	Renofa Yamaguchi	1–1 (a.e.t.) (5–3 p)	Kashiwa Reysol	Yamaguchi
	Ryota Ozawa 64'	Report	Shu Morooka 81'	Stadium: Ishin Me-Life Stadium; Attendance: 4,689; Referee: Takuto Okabe
	Penalties
	Daigo Furukawa (penalty scored); Ota Yamamoto (penalty scored); Hikaru Naruoka (penalty scored); Kazuya Noyori (penalty scored); Kohei Tanabe (penalty scored)		(penalty scored) Léo Ceará; (penalty missed) Gaku Shibasaki; (penalty scored) Naomichi Ueda; (penalty scored) Ryuta Koike

16 April First round – Match 3	Fukushima United	2–3	Kashiwa Reysol	Fukushima
	Kiichi Yajima 45', 45+2'	Report	Diego 5'; Sachiro Toshima 19'; Masaki Watai 83'	Stadium: Toho Minna no Stadium; Attendance: 1,808; Referee: Koichiro Fukushima

4 June Play-off round first leg	Tokyo Verdy	0–3	Kashiwa Reysol	Chofu
		JLeague.co (EN); JLeague.jp (JA)	Nobuteru Nakagawa 23'; Tojiro Kubo 62'; Yuki Kakita 90+4'	Stadium: Ajinomoto Stadium; Attendance: 8,377; Referee: Keigo Sendachi

8 June Play-off round second leg	Kashiwa Reysol	2–1 (5–1 agg.)	Tokyo Verdy	Kashiwa
	Masaki Watai 50'; Yuki Kakita 71'	JLeague.co (EN); JLeague.jp (JA)	Itsuki Someno 43'	Stadium: Sankyo Frontier Kashiwa Stadium; Attendance: 8,037; Referee: Robert Jones (England)

3 September Prime round QF Leg 1	Yokohama F. Marinos	1–4	Kashiwa Reysol	Yokohama
	Asahi Uenaka 90+3'; Kenta Inoue (yellow card) 30'; Ren Kato (yellow card) 36'	Report	Diego 18'; Yusuke Segawa 53'; Yuki Kakita 70', 90+8'; Nobuteru Nakagawa (yellow card) 54'; Keita Inoue (yellow card) 68'	Stadium: Nissan Stadium; Attendance: 9,656; Referee: Akihiko Ikeuchi

7 September Prime round QF Leg 2	Kashiwa Reysol	1–0 (5–1 agg.)	Yokohama F. Marinos	Kashiwa
	Sachiro Toshima 90+3'; Nobuteru Nakagawa (yellow card) 68'; Hayato Nakata (yellow card) 84'	Report	Toichi Suzuki (yellow card) 5'; Riku Yamane (yellow card) 29'; eison Quiñónes (yellow card) 53'; Jun Amano (yellow card) 75'	Stadium: Sankyo Frontier Kashiwa Stadium; Attendance: 11,682; Referee: Futoshi Nakamura

8 October Semi Final Leg 1	Kawasaki Frontale	3–1	Kashiwa Reysol	Kawasaki
	Yuki Yamamoto 10'; Sai van Wermeskerken 23'; Tatsuya Ito 85'; Filip Uremović (yellow card) 32'	Report	Yoshio Koizumi 63'; Riki Harakawa (yellow card) 37'	Stadium: Kawasaki Todoroki Stadium; Attendance: 19,505; Referee: Yudai Yamamoto

12 October Semi Final Leg 2	Kashiwa Reysol	4–1 (5–4 agg.)	Kawasaki Frontale	Kashiwa
	Yuki Kakita 26'; Hayato Nakama 73'; Mao Hosoya 76', 90+2'; Nobuteru Nakagawa (yellow card) 82'	Report	Yasuto Wakizaka 4'; Sai Van Wermeskerken (yellow card) 45+2'; Filip Uremovic (red card) 56'; Lazar Romanic (yellow card) 76'	Stadium: Sankyo Frontier Kashiwa Stadium; Attendance: 14,093; Referee: Yoshiro Imamura

1 November Final	Kashiwa Reysol	1–3	Sanfrecce Hiroshima	Tokyo
	Mao Hosoya 81'	Report	Hayato Araki 25'; Shunki Higashi 38'; Ryo Germain 45+2'; Tsukasa Shiotani (yellow card) 45+1'	Stadium: Japan National Stadium; Attendance: 62,466; Referee: Takafumi Mikuriya

=== Emperor's Cup ===
11 June Round 2	Kashiwa Reysol	0–2 (a.e.t.)	Toyo University	Kashiwa
		Report	Yusei Yamanouchi 107'; Yoda 120+1'	Stadium: Sankyo Frontier Kashiwa Stadium; Attendance: 3,052; Referee: Koji Takasaki

== Team statistics ==
=== Appearances and goals ===
As of 9 November 2025

No.	Pos.	Player	J1 League		Emperor's Cup		J.League Cup		Total	
No.	Pos.	Player	Apps	Goals	Apps	Goals	Apps	Goals	Apps	Goals
1	GK	(Japan) Haruki Saruta	0	0	0	0	0	0	0	0
2	DF	(Japan) Hiromu Mitsumaru	0	0	0	0	0	0	0	0
3	DF	(Brazil) Diego	0	0	0	0	0	0	0	0
4	DF	(Japan) Taiyo Koga	0	0	0	0	0	0	0	0
5	DF	(Japan) Hayato Tanaka	0	0	0	0	0	0	0	0
6	MF	(Japan) Yuto Yamada	0	0	0	0	0	0	0	0
8	MF	(Japan) Yoshio Koizumi	0	0	0	0	0	0	0	0
11	MF	(Japan) Masaki Watai	0	0	0	0	0	0	0	0
13	DF	(Japan) Tomoya Inukai	0	0	0	0	0	0	0	0
14	MF	(Japan) Tomoya Koyamatsu	0	0	0	0	0	0	0	0
16	DF	(Japan) Eiichi Katayama	0	0	0	0	0	0	0	0
17	MF	(Japan) Kohei Tezuka	0	0	0	0	0	0	0	0
19	MF	(Japan) Hayato Nakama	0	0	0	0	0	0	0	0
20	MF	(Japan) Yusuke Segawa	0	0	0	0	0	0	0	0
21	MF	(Japan) Yudai Konishi	0	0	0	0	0	0	0	0
22	DF	(Japan) Hiroki Noda	0	0	0	0	0	0	0	0
24	MF	(Japan) Tojiro Kubo	0	0	0	0	0	0	0	0
25	GK	(Japan) Ryosuke Kojima	0	0	0	0	0	0	0	0
26	DF	(Japan) Daiki Sugioka	0	0	0	0	0	0	0	0
27	MF	(Japan) Koki Kumasaka	0	0	0	0	0	0	0	0
28	MF	(Japan) Sachiro Toshima	0	0	0	0	0	0	0	0
29	GK	(Japan) Kengo Nagai	0	0	0	0	0	0	0	0
40	MF	(Japan) Riki Harakawa	0	0	0	0	0	0	0	0
41	GK	(Japan) Daiki Sakata	0	0	0	0	0	0	0	0
42	DF	(Japan) Wataru Harada	0	0	0	0	0	0	0	0
46	GK	(Japan) Kenta Matsumoto	0	0	0	0	0	0	0	0
88	DF	(Japan) Seiya Baba	0	0	0	0	0	0	0	0
Players featured on a match for the team, but left the club mid-season, either permanently or on loan transfer
15	FW	(Japan) Kosuke Kinoshita	0	0	0	0	0	0	0	0
33	FW	(Japan) Eiji Shirai	0	0	0	0	0	0	0	0
