= 2026 Kashiwa Reysol season =

Kashiwa Reysol
2026 season
- Chairman: Ryuichiro Takikawa
- Manager: Ricardo Rodríguez
Home colours	Away colours
- All statistics correct as of 19 April 2025.

The 2026 Kashiwa Reysol season was the club's 86th season in existence and the 6th consecutive season in the top flight of Japanese football.

== Squad ==
No.	Name	Nationality	Date of birth (age)	Previous club	Contract since	Contract end
Goalkeepers
1	Haruki Saruta	(Japan)	23 April 1999 (age 27)	(Japan) Yokohama FC	2018	
25	Ryosuke Kojima	(Japan)	30 January 1997 (age 29)	(Japan) Albirex Niigata	2025	
29	Kengo Nagai	(Japan)	6 November 1994 (age 31)	(Japan) Tokushima Vortis	2025	
41	Daiki Sakata	(Japan)	11 September 1994 (age 32)	(Japan) Avispa Fukuoka	2025	
46	Kenta Matsumoto	(Japan)	4 May 1997 (age 29)	(Japan) Omiya Ardija	2020	
Defenders
2	Hiromu Mitsumaru	(Japan)	6 July 1993 (age 33)	(Japan) Sagan Tosu	2020	
4	Taiyo Koga	(Japan)	28 October 1998 (age 27)	(Japan) Avispa Fukuoka	2017	
13	Tomoya Inukai	(Japan)	12 May 1993 (age 33)	(Japan) Urawa Red Diamonds	2024	
22	Hiroki Noda	(Japan)	27 July 1997 (age 29)	(Japan) Montedio Yamagata	2024	
26	Daiki Sugioka	(Japan)	8 September 1998 (age 28)	(Japan) Machida Zelvia	2025	
31	Shumpei Naruse	(Japan)	17 January 2001 (age 25)	(Japan) Nagoya Grampus	2025	
32	Yusei Yamanouchi	(Japan)	1 September 2003 (age 23)	(Japan) Toyo University	2025	
38	Rei Shimano	(Japan)	1 July 2004 (age 22)	(Japan) Meiji University	2025	
42	Wataru Harada	(Japan)	22 July 1996 (age 30)	(Japan) Sagan Tosu	2025	
88	Seiya Baba	(Japan)	24 October 2001 (age 24)	(Japan) Hokkaido Consadole Sapporo	2025	
Midfielders
6	Yuto Yamada	(Japan)	17 May 2000 (age 26)	(Japan) Tochigi SC	2019	
8	Yoshio Koizumi	(Japan)	5 October 1996 (age 29)	(Japan) Urawa Red Diamonds	2025	
11	Masaki Watai	(Japan)	18 July 1999 (age 27)	(Portugal) Boavista	2025	
16	Koya Yuruki	(Japan)	3 July 1995 (age 31)	(Japan) Vissel Kobe	2026	
17	Kohei Tezuka	(Japan)	6 April 1996 (age 30)	(Japan) Sagan Tosu	2024	
19	Hayato Nakama	(Japan)	16 May 1992 (age 34)	(Japan) Kashima Antlers	2025	
20	Yusuke Segawa	(Japan)	7 February 1994 (age 32)	(Japan) Kawasaki Frontale	2025	
21	Yudai Konishi	(Japan)	18 April 1998 (age 28)	(Japan) Montedio Yamagata	2025	
23	Kaiji Chonan	(Japan)	7 April 2009 (age 17)	Youth Team	2024	
24	Tojiro Kubo	(Japan)	5 April 1999 (age 27)	(Japan) Sagan Tosu	2025	
27	Koki Kumasaka	(Japan)	15 April 2001 (age 25)	(Japan) Tokyo International University	2025	
28	Sachiro Toshima	(Japan)	26 September 1995 (age 30)	(Japan) Albirex Niigata	2020	
30	Yuito Kamo	(Japan)	18 October 2008 (age 17)	Youth Team	2024	
34	Takumi Tsuchiya	(Japan)	25 October 2003 (age 22)	(Japan) Ventforet Kofu	2022	
37	Yoshikaze Tsunoda	(Japan)	18 August 2003 (age 23)	(Japan) Keio University	2026	2026
39	Nobuteru Nakagawa	(Japan)	15 May 2002 (age 24)	(Japan) Hosei University	2024	
40	Riki Harakawa	(Japan)	18 August 1993 (age 33)	(Japan) FC Tokyo	2025	
87	Hinata Yamauchi	(Japan)	30 May 2001 (age 25)	(Japan) Kawasaki Frontale	2024	2028
Strikers
9	Mao Hosoya	(Japan)	17 September 2001 (age 24)	Youth Team	2019	
14	Tomoaki Ōkubo	(Japan)	23 July 1998 (age 28)	(Japan) Urawa Red Diamonds	2026	
15	Yōta Komi	(Japan)	11 August 2002 (age 24)	(Japan) Albirex Niigata	2025	
18	Yuki Kakita	(Japan)	14 July 1997 (age 29)	(Japan) Kashima Antlers	2023	
36	Nabel Yoshitaka Furusawa	(Japan)	28 March 2003 (age 23)	(Japan) Tokyo International University	2024	
Players who are on loan to other club
5	Hayato Tanaka	(Japan)	1 November 2003 (age 22)	(Japan) V-Varen Nagasaki	2021	
37	Shun Nakajima	(Japan)	8 April 2002 (age 24)	(Japan) Ryutsu Keizai University	2024	
	Masato Sasaki (G)	(Japan)	1 May 2002 (age 24)	(Japan) Fagiano Okayama	2021	
	Takuya Shimamura	(Japan)	6 March 1999 (age 27)	(Japan) Albirex Niigata	2023	
	Ota Yamamoto	(Japan)	4 June 2004 (age 22)	(Japan) Renofa Yamaguchi	2024	
	Hidetaka Maie	(Japan)	28 July 2003 (age 23)	(Japan) FC Ryukyu	2022	
	Mohammad Farzan Sana	(Japan) (India)	30 June 2006 (age 20)	(Japan) Thespa Gunma	2025	
	Mohamad Sadiki Wade	(Japan) (Senegal)	29 May 2006 (age 20)	(Japan) FC Ryukyu	2025	
Players who left during mid-season

== Club officials ==
Club staff 2025

Position	Name
Manager	(Spain) Ricardo Rodríguez
Assistant manager	(Japan) Ryoichi Kurisawa
Coaches	(Japan) Hidekazu Otani (Japan) Yuta Someya
Coaches & Physical coach	(Japan) Naoya Matsubara
Goalkeeping coach	(Japan) Keita Inoue
Technical	(Japan) Yasushi Okamura
Doctor	(Japan) Kojiro Hyodo
Medical	(Japan) Kaoru Arakawa (Japan) Hiroyuki Akai (Japan) Toshiya Itagaki (Japan) Hisao Iwaki (Brazil) Fabiano
Interpreter	(Japan) Isao Yakita (Japan) Masayoshi Edson Hayakawa (Japan) Michinori Katsuta
Scout and support coach	(South Korea) Lee Chang-won
Equipment	(Japan) Masafumi Kimura
Competent	(Japan) Takumi Miyamoto

== Transfers ==
=== In ===
Pre-season

Date	Position	Player	Transferred from	Ref
Permanent Transfer
15 December 2025	FW	(Japan) William Owie	(Japan) FC Gifu	End of loan
15 December 2025	FW	(Japan) Tomoaki Ōkubo	(Japan) Urawa Red Diamonds	Free
17 December 2025	MF	(Japan) Fumiya Unoki	(Japan) Iwaki FC	End of loan
24 December 2025	GK	(Japan) Masato Sasaki	(Japan) Fagiano Okayama	End of loan
25 December 2025	DF	(Japan) Naoki Kawaguchi	(Japan) Júbilo Iwata	End of loan
26 December 2025	MF	(Japan) Takuya Shimamura	(Japan) Albirex Niigata	End of loan
27 December 2025	MF	(Japan) Koya Yuruki	(Japan) Vissel Kobe	Free
28 December 2025	MF	(Japan) (India) Mohammad Farzan Sana	(Japan) Thespa Gunma	End of loan
29 December 2025	MF	(Japan) Takumi Tsuchiya	(Japan) Ventforet Kofu	End of loan
30 December 2025	FW	(Japan) Ota Yamamoto	(Japan) Renofa Yamaguchi FC	End of loan
3 January 2026	MF	(Japan) Hinata Yamauchi	(Japan) Kawasaki Frontale	Free
3 January 2026	FW	(Japan) (Senegal) Mohamad Sadiki Wade	(Japan) FC Ryukyu	End of loan
3 January 2026	FW	(Japan) Hidetaka Maie	(Japan) FC Ryukyu	End of loan
4 January 2026	MF	(Japan) Yoshikaze Tsunoda	(Japan) Keio University	Free
Loan Transfer

Post-season

Date	Position	Player	Transferred from	Ref
Permanent Transfer
30 June 2026	DF	(Japan) Shun Nakajima	(Japan) Iwaki FC	End of loan
30 June 2026	DF	(Japan) Taisei Kuwada	(Japan) Iwaki FC	End of loan
30 June 2026	MF	(Japan) Masato Sasaki	(Japan) Iwaki FC	End of loan
30 June 2026	MF	(Japan) Takuya Shimamura	(Japan) Albirex Niigata	End of loan
30 June 2026	MF	(Japan) (India) Mohammad Farzan Sana	(Japan) Thespa Gunma	End of loan
30 June 2026	FW	(Japan) Ota Yamamoto	(Japan) RB Omiya Ardija	End of loan
30 June 2026	FW	(Japan) (Senegal) Mohamad Sadiki Wade	(Japan) FC Gifu	End of loan
30 June 2026	DF	(Japan) Hayato Tanaka	(Japan) Cerezo Osaka	End of loan
30 June 2026	FW	(Japan) Hidetaka Maie	(Japan) Azul Claro Numazu	End of loan
Loan Transfer

=== Out ===
Pre-season

Date	Position	Player	Transferred To	Ref
Permanent Transfer
7 December 2025	DF	(Japan) Eiichi Katayama	(Japan) Urawa Red Diamonds	Free
16 December 2025	FW	(Japan) William Owie	(Japan) Iwaki FC	Free
18 December 2025	MF	(Japan) Fumiya Unoki	(Japan) Vanraure Hachinohe	Free
18 December 2025	MF	(Japan) Kazuki Kumazawa	(Japan) Giravanz Kitakyushu	Free
20 December 2025	DF	(Brazil) Diego	(Japan) Vissel Kobe	Free
26 December 2025	DF	(Japan) Naoki Kawaguchi	(Japan) Júbilo Iwata	Free
30 December 2025	MF	(Japan) Tomoya Koyamatsu	(Japan) Nagoya Grampus	Free
4 January 2026	FW	(Japan) Hidetaka Maie	(Japan) Azul Claro Numazu	Undisclosed
Loan Transfer
25 December 2025	MF	(Japan) Masato Sasaki	(Japan) Iwaki FC	Season loan
27 December 2025	MF	(Japan) Takuya Shimamura	(Japan) Albirex Niigata	Season loan
29 December 2025	MF	(Japan) (India) Mohammad Farzan Sana	(Japan) Thespa Gunma	Season loan
31 December 2025	DF	(Japan) Shun Nakajima	(Japan) Iwaki FC	Season loan
3 January 2026	DF	(Japan) Taisei Kuwada	(Japan) Iwaki FC	Season loan
4 January 2026	FW	(Japan) Ota Yamamoto	(Japan) RB Omiya Ardija	Season loan
4 January 2026	FW	(Japan) (Senegal) Mohamad Sadiki Wade	(Japan) FC Gifu	Season loan
4 January 2026	DF	(Japan) Hayato Tanaka	(Japan) Cerezo Osaka	Season loan

== Pre-season and friendlies ==
=== Tour of Ibusuki (11 Jan - 24 Jan) ===
11 January 1	Kashiwa Reysol	11–0	Miyazaki Sangyo Keiei University	Kagoshima
				Stadium: Ibusuki Iwasaki Hotel Soccer Stadium

16 January 2	Kashiwa Reysol	5–0	Thespa Gunma	Kagoshima
				Stadium: Ibusuki Iwasaki Hotel Soccer Stadium

20 January 3	Kashiwa Reysol	6–1	Fujieda MYFC	Miyazaki
				Stadium: Seagaia Event Square 1

24 January 4	Kashiwa Reysol	1–4	Sanfrecce Hiroshima	Miyazaki
			Daichi Yamazaki; Kim Joo-sung; Riki Kato; Sota Nakamura	Stadium: Seagaia Event Square 1

31 January 30th Chibagin Cup	Kashiwa Reysol	–	JEF United Chiba	Chiba
				Stadium: Sankyo Frontier Kashiwa Stadium

== Competitions ==
=== J1 League ===
Pos	Team	Pld	W	PKW	PKL	L	GF	GA	GD	Pts	Qualification
1	Kashima Antlers	18	13	2	2	1	29	9	+20	45	Final
2	FC Tokyo	18	9	4	2	3	28	16	+12	37	3rd–4th place playoff
3	Machida Zelvia	18	8	5	3	2	23	19	+4	37	5th–6th place playoff
4	Kawasaki Frontale	18	7	3	1	7	23	27	−4	28	7th–8th place playoff
5	Tokyo Verdy	18	7	3	1	7	19	25	−6	28	9th–10th place playoff
6	Urawa Red Diamonds	18	7	0	4	7	25	18	+7	25	11th–12th place playoff
7	Yokohama F. Marinos	18	6	0	2	10	28	29	−1	20	13th–14th place playoff
8	Kashiwa Reysol	18	6	1	0	11	21	24	−3	20	15th–16th place playoff
9	Mito HollyHock	18	2	4	4	8	19	35	−16	18	17th–18th place playoff
10	JEF United Chiba	18	3	0	3	12	18	31	−13	12	19th–20th place playoff

Source: JLeague.co, J.League Data Site
Rules for classification: 1) Points; 2) Goal difference; 3) Goals scored; 4) Head-to-head.

==== Matches ====
8 February 1	Kawasaki Frontale	5–3	Kashiwa Reysol	Kawasaki
	Erison 6' (pen.), 11', 25'; Yuto Matsunagane 68'; Yasuto Wakizaka 90+4'	Report	Mao Hosoya 38'; Yusuke Segawa 61'; Hinata Yamauchi 81'	Stadium: Kawasaki Todoroki Stadium; Attendance: 22,226; Referee: Akihiko Ikeuchi

15 February 2	Kashiwa Reysol	1–2	Tokyo Verdy	Chiba
	Yoshio Koizumi 30'; Sachiro Toshima (yellow card) 18'; Wataru Harada (red card) 90+3'	Report	Itsuki Someno 63'; Yuya Fukuda 90+2'; Rei Hirakawa (yellow card) 40'; Yosuke Uchida (yellow card) 90'	Stadium: Sankyo Frontier Kashiwa Stadium; Attendance: 13,643; Referee: Hiroki Kasahara

21 February 3	Kashima Antlers	2–0	Kashiwa Reysol	Kashima
	Léo Ceará 36'; Naomichi Ueda 53'	Report	Nobuteru Nakagawa (yellow card) 35'; Yōta Komi (yellow card) 69'	Stadium: Kashima Soccer Stadium; Attendance: 25,993; Referee: Hiroyuki Kimura

28 February 4	FC Tokyo	0–2	Kashiwa Reysol	Chōfu
	Ryunosuke Sato (yellow card) 73'	Report	Yuki Kakita 54'; Yusuke Segawa 83'; Kento Hashimoto (yellow card) 33'; Hinata Yamauchi (yellow card) 65'; Yoshio Koizumi (yellow card) 88'	Stadium: Ajinomoto Stadium; Attendance: 21,869; Referee: Koki Nagamine

7 March 5	JEF United Chiba	2–0	Kashiwa Reysol	Chiba
	Takumi Tsukui 48'; Daichi Ishikawa 61'	Report	Tojiro Kubo 88'; Nobuteru Nakagawa (yellow card) 43'	Stadium: Fukuda Denshi Arena; Attendance: 14,646; Referee: Atsushi Kamimura

14 March 6	Kashiwa Reysol	0–1	Machida Zelvia	Chiba
	Seiya Baba (yellow card) 73'	Report	Tete Yengi 28'; Kotaro Hayashi (yellow card) 83'	Stadium: Sankyo Frontier Kashiwa Stadium; Attendance: 12,538; Referee: Koei Koya

18 March 7	Urawa Red Diamonds	1–1 (2–4 p)	Kashiwa Reysol	Saitama
	Kaito Yasui 49'	Report	Yusuke Segawa 66'; Yoshio Koizumi (yellow card) 25'	Stadium: Saitama Stadium 2002; Attendance: 27,106; Referee: Akihiko Ikeuchi
	Penalties
	Ryoma Watanabe (penalty scored); Isaac Kiese Thelin (penalty scored); Junpei Hayakawa (penalty missed); Yūta Miyamoto (penalty missed)		Yota Komi (penalty scored); Yusei Yamanouchi (penalty scored); Sachiro Toshima (penalty scored); Yusuke Segawa (penalty scored)

22 March 8	Kashiwa Reysol	3–0	Mito HollyHock	Chiba
	Nobuteru Nakagawa 16'; Koshi Osaki 32' (o.g.); Yusuke Segawa 83'	Report	Kishin Gokita (yellow card) 20'; Sho Omori (yellow card) 45+1'; Mizuki Arai (yellow card) 90+4'	Stadium: Sankyo Frontier Kashiwa Stadium; Attendance: 12,733; Referee: Masuya Ueda

5 April 9	Kashiwa Reysol	3–0	Yokohama F. Marinos	Chiba
	Yōta Komi 19' (pen.); Koya Yuruki 81'; Hayato Nakama 83'; Tomoaki Ōkubo (yellow card) 88'	Report	Jeisson Quinones (red card) 13'	Stadium: Sankyo Frontier Kashiwa Stadium; Attendance: 13,515; Referee: Yusuke Ohashi

11 April 10	Machida Zelvia	1–0	Kashiwa Reysol	Tokyo
	Na Sang-ho 76'	Report		Stadium: Machida GION Stadium; Attendance: 11,325; Referee: Atsushi Kamimura

19 April 11	Mito HollyHock	2–0	Kashiwa Reysol	Ibaraki
	Tada Keisuke 61'; Arata Watanabe 66'; Danilo Cardoso (yellow card) 45+1'; Kiichi Yamazaki (yellow card) 76'; Daisuke Kimori (red card) 77'	Report	Tojiro Kubo (red card) 34'	Stadium: K's denki Stadium Mito; Attendance: 8,831; Referee: Ryo Tanimoto

24 April 12	Kashiwa Reysol	0–1	Kashima Antlers	Chiba
	Hiromu Mitsumaru (yellow card) 33'; Yoshio Koizumi (yellow card) 68'	Report	Yuma Suzuki 45+1'; Koki Anzai (yellow card) 49'; Kimito Nono (yellow card) 68'; Keisuke Tsukui (red card) 89'	Stadium: Sankyo Frontier Kashiwa Stadium; Attendance: 13,132; Referee: Takafumi Mikuriya

29 April 13	Kashiwa Reysol	1–3	FC Tokyo	Chiba
	Nobuteru Nakagawa 73'; Daiki Sugioka (yellow card) 13'	Report	Keita Endo 48'; Ryunosuke Sato 61', 89' (pen.)	Stadium: Sankyo Frontier Kashiwa Stadium; Attendance: 13,073; Referee: Futoshi Nakamura

3 May 14	Tokyo Verdy	1–0	Kashiwa Reysol	Chōfu
	Yuta Arai 90'; Itsuki Someno (yellow card) 73'	Report		Stadium: Ajinomoto Stadium; Attendance: 21,569; Referee: Yuzo Sutani

6 May 15	Kashiwa Reysol	0–1	Urawa Red Diamonds	Chiba
		Report	Ryoma Watanabe 58' (yellow card) 63'	Stadium: Sankyo Frontier Kashiwa Stadium; Attendance: 13,258; Referee: Yusuke Araki

10 May 16	Kashiwa Reysol	1–0	Kawasaki Frontale	Chiba
	Mao Hosoya 72'	Report		Stadium: Sankyo Frontier Kashiwa Stadium; Attendance: 13,045; Referee: Yusuke Ohashi

16 May 17	Yokohama F. Marinos	0–1	Kashiwa Reysol	Yokohama
	Ryotaro Tsunoda (yellow card) 46'; Ren Kato (yellow card) 83'	Report	Koya Yuruki 41'; Hiromu Mitsumaru (yellow card) 79'	Stadium: Nissan Stadium; Attendance: 26,122; Referee: Atsushi Kamimura

23 May 18	Kashiwa Reysol	4–2	JEF United Chiba	Chiba
	Yuki Kakita 35'; Yoshio Koizumi 39'; Mao Hosoya 76'; Taiyo Koga 89'	Report	Ryota Kuboniwa 45' (yellow card) 67'; Issei Takahashi 85'; Dudu Pacheco (yellow card) 86'; Takumi Matsumura (yellow card) 90'	Stadium: Sankyo Frontier Kashiwa Stadium; Attendance: 13,506; Referee: Damian Kos (Poland)

30 May Placement Leg 1	Kyoto Sanga	2–6	Kashiwa Reysol	Kyoto
	Haruki Arai 2'; Rafael Elias 67'; Ryuma Nakano (yellow card) 14'; Joao Pedro (yellow card) 71'	Report	Yoshio Koizumi 1'; Yuki Kakita 38'; Daiki Sugioka 45+1'; Yōta Komi 87', 90+6'; Tajiro Kubo 90'; Ryuma Nakano (yellow card) 14'	Stadium: Sanga Stadium by Kyocera; Attendance: 12,503; Referee: Atsushi Kamimura

6 June Placement Leg 2	Kashiwa Reysol	0–1 (7–2 agg.)	Kyoto Sanga	Chiba
	Wataru Harada (yellow card) 55'; Riki Harakawa (yellow card) 64'	Report	Joao Pedro 57' (yellow card) 37'; Sung-jun Yoon (yellow card) 45'; Yoshinori Suzuki (yellow card) 87'; Rafael Elias (yellow card) 90+1'	Stadium: Sankyo Frontier Kashiwa Stadium; Attendance: 12,245; Referee: Hiroyuki Kimura

== Team statistics ==
=== Appearances and goals ===
As of 6 June 2026

No.	Pos.	Player	J1 League		Total	
No.	Pos.	Player	Apps	Goals	Apps	Goals
1	GK	(Japan) Haruki Saruta	0	0	0	0
2	DF	(Japan) Hiromu Mitsumaru	14+4	0	18	0
4	DF	(Japan) Taiyo Koga	20	1	20	1
6	MF	(Japan) Yuto Yamada	0	0	0	0
8	MF	(Japan) Yoshio Koizumi	18+1	3	19	3
9	FW	(Japan) Mao Hosoya	10+10	3	20	3
11	MF	(Japan) Masaki Watai	0	0	0	0
13	DF	(Japan) Tomoya Inukai	0+1	0	1	0
14	FW	(Japan) Tomoaki Ōkubo	1+5	0	6	0
15	FW	(Japan) Yōta Komi	10+4	3	14	3
16	MF	(Japan) Koya Yuruki	6+4	2	10	2
17	MF	(Japan) Kohei Tezuka	0	0	0	0
18	FW	(Japan) Yuki Kakita	9+7	3	16	3
19	MF	(Japan) Hayato Nakama	0+5	1	5	1
20	MF	(Japan) Yusuke Segawa	6+14	4	20	4
21	MF	(Japan) Yudai Konishi	11+3	0	14	0
22	DF	(Japan) Hiroki Noda	0+1	0	1	0
23	MF	(Japan) Kaiji Chonan	0	0	0	0
24	MF	(Japan) Tojiro Kubo	16+1	2	17	2
25	GK	(Japan) Haruki Saruta	17	0	17	0
26	DF	(Japan) Daiki Sugioka	10+6	1	16	1
27	MF	(Japan) Koki Kumasaka	0+1	0	1	0
28	MF	(Japan) Sachiro Toshima	5+3	0	8	0
29	GK	(Japan) Kengo Nagai	3	0	3	0
30	MF	(Japan) Yuito Kamo	0	0	0	0
31	DF	(Japan) Shumpei Naruse	0	0	0	0
32	DF	(Japan) Yusei Yamanouchi	10+6	0	16	0
34	MF	(Japan) Takumi Tsuchiya	0	0	0	0
36	FW	(Japan) Nabel Yoshitaka Furusawa	0	0	0	0
37	MF	(Japan) Yoshikaze Tsunoda	0	0	0	0
38	DF	(Japan) Rei Shimano	1+3	0	4	0
39	MF	(Japan) Nobuteru Nakagawa	19+1	2	20	2
40	MF	(Japan) Riki Harakawa	4+4	0	8	0
41	GK	(Japan) Daiki Sakata	0	0	0	0
42	DF	(Japan) Wataru Harada	11+2	0	13	0
46	GK	(Japan) Kenta Matsumoto	0	0	0	0
87	MF	(Japan) Hinata Yamauchi	9+6	1	15	1
88	DF	(Japan) Seiya Baba	6+7	0	13	0
