= 2026–27 Kashiwa Reysol season =

Kashiwa Reysol
2026–27 season
- Chairman: Ryuichiro Takikawa
- Manager: Ricardo Rodríguez
Home colours	Away colours
- All statistics correct as of 14 June 2026.

The 2026–27 Kashiwa Reysol season is the club's 87th season in existence and the 7th consecutive season in the top flight of Japanese football. They will also play in the 2026–27 AFC Champions League Elite after finishing 2nd in the 2025 J1 League. This will be Kashiwa Reysol's fifth appearance in the ACL since the 2018 season.

== Squad ==
No.	Name	Nationality	Date of birth (age)	Previous club	Contract since	Contract end
Goalkeepers
1	Haruki Saruta	(Japan)	23 April 1999 (age 27)	(Japan) Yokohama FC	2018	2028
25	Ryosuke Kojima	(Japan)	30 January 1997 (age 29)	(Japan) Albirex Niigata	2025	
29	Kengo Nagai	(Japan)	6 November 1994 (age 32)	(Japan) Tokushima Vortis	2025	
46	Kenta Matsumoto	(Japan)	4 May 1997 (age 29)	(Japan) Omiya Ardija	2020	
77	Tomoya Wakahara	(Japan)	28 December 1999 (age 26)	(Japan) JEF United Chiba	2026	
Defenders
2	Hiromu Mitsumaru	(Japan)	6 July 1993 (age 33)	(Japan) Sagan Tosu	2020	
3	Shogo Asada	(Japan)	6 July 1998 (age 28)	(Japan) Kyoto Sanga	2026	
4	Taiyo Koga	(Japan)	28 October 1998 (age 28)	(Japan) Avispa Fukuoka	2017	
13	Tomoya Inukai	(Japan)	12 May 1993 (age 33)	(Japan) Urawa Red Diamonds	2024	
22	Hiroki Noda	(Japan)	27 July 1997 (age 29)	(Japan) Montedio Yamagata	2024	
26	Daiki Sugioka	(Japan)	8 September 1998 (age 28)	(Japan) Machida Zelvia	2025	
32	Yusei Yamanouchi	(Japan)	1 September 2003 (age 23)	(Japan) Toyo University	2025	2029
38	Rei Shimano	(Japan)	1 July 2004 (age 22)	(Japan) Meiji University	2025	
42	Wataru Harada	(Japan)	22 July 1996 (age 30)	(Japan) Sagan Tosu	2025	2028
44	Kenshin Yuba	(Japan)	12 October 2000 (age 26)	(Japan) Sagan Tosu	2026	
88	Seiya Baba	(Japan)	24 October 2001 (age 25)	(Japan) Hokkaido Consadole Sapporo	2025	2029
Midfielders
6	Yuto Yamada	(Japan)	17 May 2000 (age 26)	(Japan) Tochigi SC	2019	2029
8	Yoshio Koizumi	(Japan)	5 October 1996 (age 30)	(Japan) Urawa Red Diamonds	2025	
11	Masaki Watai	(Japan)	18 July 1999 (age 27)	(Portugal) Boavista	2025	2028
16	Koya Yuruki	(Japan)	3 July 1995 (age 31)	(Japan) Vissel Kobe	2026	
17	Kohei Tezuka	(Japan)	6 April 1996 (age 30)	(Japan) Sagan Tosu	2024	
19	Hayato Nakama	(Japan)	16 May 1992 (age 34)	(Japan) Kashima Antlers	2025	
20	Yusuke Segawa	(Japan)	7 February 1994 (age 32)	(Japan) Kawasaki Frontale	2025	
21	Yudai Konishi	(Japan)	18 April 1998 (age 28)	(Japan) Montedio Yamagata	2025	
23	Kaiji Chonan	(Japan)	7 April 2009 (age 17)	Youth Team	2024	
24	Tojiro Kubo	(Japan)	5 April 1999 (age 27)	(Japan) Sagan Tosu	2025	2029
27	Koki Kumasaka	(Japan)	15 April 2001 (age 25)	(Japan) Tokyo International University	2025	
28	Sachiro Toshima	(Japan)	26 September 1995 (age 31)	(Japan) Albirex Niigata	2020	
30	Shusuke Furuya	(Japan)	26 January 2005 (age 21)	Youth Team	2024	
33	Sota Iwanaga	(Japan)	7 October 2005 (age 21)	(Japan) Kyushu Sangyo University	2026	
39	Nobuteru Nakagawa	(Japan)	15 May 2002 (age 24)	(Japan) Hosei University	2024	
40	Riki Harakawa	(Japan)	18 August 1993 (age 33)	(Japan) FC Tokyo	2025	2028
64	Ryo Igarashi	(Japan)	19 December 2009 (age 16)	Youth Team	2026	2027
87	Hinata Yamauchi	(Japan)	30 May 2001 (age 25)	(Japan) Kawasaki Frontale	2024	2028
	Yuito Kamo	(Japan)	18 October 2008 (age 18)	Youth Team	2024	
Strikers
5	Keita Endō	(Japan)	22 November 1997 (age 28)	(Japan) FC Tokyo	2026	2027
9	Mao Hosoya	(Japan)	17 September 2001 (age 25)	Youth Team	2019	2030
14	Tomoaki Ōkubo	(Japan)	23 July 1998 (age 28)	(Japan) Urawa Red Diamonds	2026	2028
15	Shōta Fujio	(Japan)	2 May 2001 (age 25)	(Japan) Machida Zelvia	2026	2027
18	Yuki Kakita	(Japan)	14 July 1997 (age 29)	(Japan) Kashima Antlers	2023	
51	Makoto Mitsuta	(Japan)	20 July 1999 (age 27)	(Japan) Vissel Kobe	2026	2027
Players who are on loan to other club
5	Hayato Tanaka	(Japan)	1 November 2003 (age 23)	(Japan) Cerezo Osaka	2021	
15	Yōta Komi	(Japan)	11 August 2002 (age 24)	(Japan) Albirex Niigata	2025	
36	Nabel Yoshitaka Furusawa	(Japan) (Ghana)	28 March 2003 (age 23)	(Japan) Tokyo International University	2024	
37	Yoshikaze Tsunoda	(Japan)	18 August 2003 (age 23)	(Japan) Keio University	2026	2027
	Masato Sasaki	(Japan)	1 May 2002 (age 24)	(Japan) Iwaki FC	2021	
	Shun Nakajima	(Japan)	8 April 2002 (age 24)	(Japan) Iwaki FC	2024	
	Taisei Kuwata	(Japan)	26 August 2002 (age 24)	(Japan) Iwaki FC	2025	
	Takuya Shimamura	(Japan)	6 March 1999 (age 27)	(Japan) Albirex Niigata	2023	
	Mohammad Farzan Sana	(Japan) (India)	30 June 2006 (age 20)	(Japan) Thespa Gunma	2025	
	Mohamad Sadiki Wade	(Japan) (Senegal)	29 May 2006 (age 20)	(Japan) FC Gifu	2025	
Players who left during mid-season
31	Shumpei Naruse	(Japan)	17 January 2001 (age 25)	(Japan) Nagoya Grampus	2025	

== Club officials ==
Club staff 2025

Position	Name
Manager	(Spain) Ricardo Rodríguez
Assistant manager	(Japan) Ryoichi Kurisawa
Coaches	(Japan) Hidekazu Otani (Japan) Yuta Someya
Coaches & Physical coach	(Japan) Naoya Matsubara
Goalkeeping coach	(Japan) Keita Inoue
Technical	(Japan) Yasushi Okamura
Doctor	(Japan) Kojiro Hyodo
Medical	(Japan) Kaoru Arakawa (Japan) Hiroyuki Akai (Japan) Toshiya Itagaki (Japan) Hisao Iwaki (Brazil) Fabiano
Interpreter	(Japan) Isao Yakita (Japan) Masayoshi Edson Hayakawa (Japan) Michinori Katsuta
Scout and support coach	(South Korea) Lee Chang-won
Equipment	(Japan) Masafumi Kimura
Competent	(Japan) Takumi Miyamoto

== Transfers ==
=== In ===
Pre-season

Date	Position	Player	Transferred from	Ref
Permanent Transfer
31 May 2026	DF	(Japan) Shun Nakajima	(Japan) Iwaki FC	End of loan
31 May 2026	DF	(Japan) Taisei Kuwada	(Japan) Iwaki FC	End of loan
31 May 2026	MF	(Japan) Masato Sasaki	(Japan) Iwaki FC	End of loan
31 May 2026	MF	(Japan) Takuya Shimamura	(Japan) Albirex Niigata	End of loan
31 May 2026	MF	(Japan) (India) Mohammad Farzan Sana	(Japan) Thespa Gunma	End of loan
31 May 2026	FW	(Japan) Ota Yamamoto	(Japan) RB Omiya Ardija	End of loan
31 May 2026	FW	(Japan) (Senegal) Mohamad Sadiki Wade	(Japan) FC Gifu	End of loan
31 May 2026	DF	(Japan) Hayato Tanaka	(Japan) Cerezo Osaka	End of loan
23 June 2026	MF	(Japan) Kenshin Yuba	(Japan) Sagan Tosu	Free
25 June 2026	GK	(Japan) Tomoya Wakahara	(Japan) JEF United Chiba	Free
26 June 2026	DF	(Japan) Shogo Asada	(Japan) Kyoto Sanga	Free
30 June 2026	FW	(Japan) Keita Endō	(Japan) FC Tokyo	Free
25 August 2026	FW	(Japan) Shōta Fujio	(Japan) Machida Zelvia	Undisclosed
Loan Transfer
28 June 2026	FW	(Japan) Makoto Mitsuta	(Japan) Gamba Osaka	Season loan

=== Out ===
Pre-season

Date	Position	Player	Transferred To	Ref
Permanent Transfer
21 June 2026	GK	(Japan) Daiki Sakata	(Japan) Kagoshima United	Free
25 June 2026	MF	(Japan) Takumi Tsuchiya	(Japan) FC Imabari	Free
30 June 2026	FW	(Japan) Ota Yamamoto	(Germany) RB Leipzig	Free
24 August 2026	DF	(Japan) Shumpei Naruse	(Japan) Nankatsu	Free
August 2026	FW	(Japan) Hiroki Noda	(Japan) Matsumoto Yamaga	Free
Loan Transfer
16 June 2026	MF	(Japan) Yoshikaze Tsunoda	(Japan) Fujieda MYFC	Season loan
24 June 2026	DF	(Japan) Shun Nakajima	(Japan) Iwaki FC	Season loan
24 June 2026	DF	(Japan) Taisei Kuwada	(Japan) Iwaki FC	Season loan
24 June 2026	GK	(Japan) Masato Sasaki	(Japan) Iwaki FC	Season loan
24 June 2026	MF	(Japan) (India) Mohammad Farzan Sana	(Japan) Thespa Gunma	Season loan
25 June 2026	DF	(Japan) Hayato Tanaka	(Japan) Tokushima Vortis	Season loan
27 June 2026	FW	(Japan) (Senegal) Mohamad Sadiki Wade	(Japan) Giravanz Kitakyushu	Season loan
28 June 2026	MF	(Japan) Takuya Shimamura	(Japan) Yokohama FC	Season loan
3 July 2026	FW	(Japan) Yōta Komi	(Japan) Cerezo Osaka	Season loan
9 September 2026	DF	(Japan) Rei Shimano	(Japan) Fujieda MYFC	Season loan
18 September 2026	FW	(Japan) (Ghana) Nabel Yoshitaka Furusawa	(Singapore) Tampines Rovers	Season loan

== Pre-season and friendlies ==
=== Tour of Abashiri (10-12 July) ===
11 July 1	Kashiwa Reysol	6–0	Sapporo University	Abashiri
		Report		Stadium: Abashiri Sports Training Field

18 July 2	Kashiwa Reysol	4–0	Tochigi City	Abashiri
		Report		Stadium: Abashiri Sports Training Field

== Competitions ==
=== J1 League ===
The matches were unveiled on 13 June.

Pos	Team	Pld	W	D	L	GF	GA	GD	Pts	Qualification or relegation
1	FC Tokyo	14	10	3	1	33	8	+25	33	Qualification for the AFC Champions League Elite league stage
2	Kashiwa Reysol	14	10	1	3	31	20	+11	31	Qualification for the AFC Champions League Elite league stage
3	Sanfrecce Hiroshima	14	9	3	2	32	10	+22	30	Qualification for the AFC Champions League Elite league stage
4	Machida Zelvia	14	8	5	1	30	10	+20	29	Qualification for the AFC Champions League Elite playoff round
5	Vissel Kobe	14	8	3	3	23	14	+9	27	

Updated to match(es) played on 8 November 2026. Source: JLeague.jp,
Rules for classification: 1) Points; 2) Goal difference; 3) Goals scored; 4) Head-to-head points; 5) Head-to-head goal difference; 6) Head-to-head goals scored; 7) Fewer disciplinary points.

==== Matches ====
8 August 1	Kashiwa Reysol	2–1	Mito HollyHock	Chiba
	Yuki Kakita 5'; Yoshio Koizumi 35'	Report	Kotaro Uchino 68' (pen.); Taishi Semba (yellow card) 90+1'	Stadium: Sankyo Frontier Kashiwa Stadium; Attendance: 13,701; Referee: Hiroki Kasahara

14 August 2	Tokyo Verdy	1–3	Kashiwa Reysol	Chōfu
	Hayashi Naoki 2'; Kaito Suzuki (yellow card) 88'	Report	Keito Endo 11'; Yusuke Segawa 20'; Tojiro Kubo 83'; Nobuteru Nakagawa (yellow card) 61'; Masaki Watai (yellow card) 90+6'	Stadium: MUFG Stadium; Attendance: 44,690; Referee: Harm Osmers (Germany)

21 August 3	Kashiwa Reysol	4–2	V-Varen Nagasaki	Chiba
	Yuki Kakita 6'; Yoshio Koizumi 62' (yellow card) 48'; Yusuke Segawa 77'; Kenshin Yuba 83'	Report	Tenmu Matsumoto 51'; Yuto Iwasaki 56'	Stadium: Sankyo Frontier Kashiwa Stadium; Attendance: 13,383; Referee: Hiroyuki Kimura

29 August 4	Shimizu S-Pulse	0–1	Kashiwa Reysol	Shizuoka
		Report	Yusuke Segawa 71'	Stadium: IAI Stadium Nihondaira; Attendance: 14,211; Referee: Koichiro Fukushima

2 September 5	Cerezo Osaka	2–0	Kashiwa Reysol	Osaka
	Solomon Sakuragawa 20', 69' (pen.); Jackson Irvine (yellow card) 42'	Report		Stadium: Yodoko Sakura Stadium; Attendance: 15,526; Referee: Hayato Shimizu

6 September 6	Kashiwa Reysol	0–2	Yokohama F. Marinos	Chiba
	Keita Endo (yellow card) 43'	Report	Ryo Miyaichi 19'; Rio Nitta 48'; Kosei Suwama (yellow card) 38'	Stadium: Sankyo Frontier Kashiwa Stadium; Attendance: 10,694; Referee: Yusuke Ohasi

11 September 7 (Rescheduled)	Kyoto Sanga	2–3	Kashiwa Reysol	Kyoto
	Rafael Elias 3', 33' (yellow card) 80'; Shimpei Fukuoka (yellow card) 21'; Temma Matsuda (yellow card) 45+3'	Report	Tojiro Kubo 59'; Yusuke Segawa 67', 71'; Taiyo Koga (yellow card) 32'; Masaki Watai (yellow card) 63'	Stadium: Sanga Stadium by Kyocera; Attendance: 9,407; Referee: Atsushi Kamimura

20 September 8	Machida Zelvia	2–4	Kashiwa Reysol	Tokyo
	Yuki Soma 38'; Kōki Ogawa 90+1'; Hokuto Shimoda (red card) 62'	Report	Yusuke Segawa 53', 88'; Keita Endō 58'; Yoshio Koizumi 65'; Koki Kumasaka (yellow card) 76'; Seiya Baba (yellow card) 85'; Riki Harakawa (yellow card) 90'	Stadium: Machida GION Stadium; Attendance: 12,703; Referee: Takafumi Mikuriya

9 October 9	Kashiwa Reysol	4–2	Vissel Kobe	Chiba
	Shōta Fujio 29'; Hinata Yamauchi 54'; Tojiro Kubo 64'; Yusuke Segawa 84'; Wataru Harada (yellow card) 90'	Report	Ren Komatsu 83'; Diego 89'; Michael Skibbe (yellow card) 90+1'	Stadium: Sankyo Frontier Kashiwa Stadium; Attendance: 13,478; Referee: Koichiro Fukushima

17 October 10	Kashiwa Reysol	1–3	Nagoya Grampus	Chiba
	Keita Endo 23'; Yoshio Koizumi (yellow card) 16'; Daiki Sugioka (yellow card) 52'	Report	Takuya Uchida 6'; Yudai Kimura 36'; Yuya Yamagishi 79'; Wataru Harada (yellow card) 90'	Stadium: Sankyo Frontier Kashiwa Stadium; Attendance: 13,651; Referee: Akihiko Ikeuchi

21 October 11	FC Tokyo	0–0	Kashiwa Reysol	Chōfu
	Hayato Inamura (yellow card) 12'; Hirokazu Ishihara (yellow card) 74'; Alexander Scholz (yellow card) 80'	Report	Yudai Konishi (yellow card) 44'; Yoshio Koizumi (yellow card) 79'; Wataru Harada (yellow card) 85'; Keita Endo (yellow card) 90+4'	Stadium: Ajinomoto Stadium; Attendance: 18,623; Referee: Koki Nagamine

24 October 12	Kashima Antlers	2–3	Kashiwa Reysol	Tokyo
	Homare Tokuda 14'; Aleksandar Čavrić 88'	Report	Keito Endo 35'; Hinata Yamauchi 45+2', 59'; Nobuteru Nakagawa (yellow card) 39'	Stadium: Japan National Stadium; Attendance: 26,729; Referee: Atsushi Kamimura

31 October 13	Kashiwa Reysol	4–0	Urawa Reds Diamonds	Chiba
	Yoshio Koizumi 37'; Kenshin Yuba 68'; Tojiro Kubo 90'; Wataru Harada 90+2' (yellow card) 88'	Report	Yuta Miyamoto (yellow card) 45' (yellow-red card); Sachiro Toshima (yellow card) 77'	Stadium: Sankyo Frontier Kashiwa Stadium; Attendance: 14,348; Referee: Hiroki Kasahara

7 November 14	Kashiwa Reysol	2–1	Kawasaki Frontale	Chiba
	Hinata Yamauchi 40', 52'	Report	Pedro Romano 44'; Kento Tachibanada (yellow card) 50'	Stadium: Sankyo Frontier Kashiwa Stadium; Attendance: 13,827; Referee: Yusuke Ohashi

20 November 15	Kashiwa Reysol	0–1	JEF United Chiba	Chiba
	Wataru Harada (yellow card) 78'	Report	Hiroto Goya 75'	Stadium: Sankyo Frontier Kashiwa Stadium; Attendance: 13,612; Referee: Jumpei Iida

16 December 16	Gamba Osaka	–	Kashiwa Reysol	Osaka
		Report		Stadium: Suita City Football Stadium

28 November 17	Kashiwa Reysol	–	Sanfrecce Hiroshima	Chiba
		Report		Stadium: Sankyo Frontier Kashiwa Stadium

6 December 18 (Rescheduled)	Kashiwa Reysol	–	Avispa Fukuoka	Chiba
		Report		Stadium: Sankyo Frontier Kashiwa Stadium

13 December 19	Fagiano Okayama	–	Kashiwa Reysol	Okayama
		Report		Stadium: City Light Stadium

19 December 20	Kawasaki Frontale	–	Kashiwa Reysol	Kawasaki
		Report		Stadium: Kawasaki Todoroki Stadium

13-14 February 21	Kashiwa Reysol	–	Shimizu S-Pulse	Chiba
				Stadium: Sankyo Frontier Kashiwa Stadium

20-21 February 22	Mito HollyHock	–	Kashiwa Reysol	Mito
				Stadium: K's denki Stadium Mito

27-28 February 23	V-Varen Nagasaki	–	Kashiwa Reysol	Nagasaki
				Stadium: Peace Stadium Connected by SoftBank

6-7 March 24	Avispa Fukuoka	–	Kashiwa Reysol	Fukuoka
				Stadium: Best Denki Stadium

10 March 25	Kashiwa Reysol	–	Kyoto Sanga	Chiba
				Stadium: Sankyo Frontier Kashiwa Stadium

13-14 March 26	Kashiwa Reysol	–	Fagiano Okayama	Chiba
				Stadium: Sankyo Frontier Kashiwa Stadium

20-21 March 27	Kashiwa Reysol	–	Tokyo Verdy	Chiba
				Stadium: Sankyo Frontier Kashiwa Stadium

2-4 April 28	Kashiwa Reysol	–	Cerezo Osaka	Chiba
				Stadium: Sankyo Frontier Kashiwa Stadium

10-11 April 29	Urawa Red Diamonds	–	Kashiwa Reysol	Saitama
				Stadium: Saitama Stadium 2002

17-18 April 30	Yokohama F. Marinos	–	Kashiwa Reysol	Yokohama
				Stadium: Nissan Stadium

24-25 April 31	Kashiwa Reysol	–	Gamba Osaka	Chiba
				Stadium: Sankyo Frontier Kashiwa Stadium

29 April 32	Kashiwa Reysol	–	FC Tokyo	Chiba
				Stadium: Sankyo Frontier Kashiwa Stadium

3-4 May 33	Vissel Kobe	–	Kashiwa Reysol	Kobe
				Stadium: Noevir Stadium Kobe

9 May 34	Kashiwa Reysol	–	Machida Zelvia	Chiba
				Stadium: Sankyo Frontier Kashiwa Stadium

15-16 May 35	Nagoya Grampus	–	Kashiwa Reysol	Toyota
				Stadium: Toyota Stadium

22-23 May 36	Sanfrecce Hiroshima	–	Kashiwa Reysol	Hiroshima
				Stadium: Edion Peace Wing Hiroshima

29-30 May 37	Kashiwa Reysol	–	Kashima Antlers	Chiba
				Stadium: Sankyo Frontier Kashiwa Stadium

6 June 38	JEF United Chiba	–	Kashiwa Reysol	Chiba
				Stadium: Fukuda Denshi Arena

=== Emperor's Cup ===
26 August Rd 2	Kashiwa Reysol	2–1	Senshu University	Chiba
	Yusuke Segawa 33'; Kaiji Chonan 45+1'; Ryo Igarashi (yellow card) 90+4'	Report	Kaito Okada 52'; Yu Shimazaki (yellow card) 59'; Kaito Okada (yellow card) 90+3'	Stadium: Sankyo Frontier Kashiwa Stadium; Attendance: 5,512; Referee: Koki Nagamine

23 September Rd 3	Kashiwa Reysol	4–0	FC Imabari	Chiba
	Mao Hosoya 37', 53'; Tojiro Kubo 44'; Sachiro Toshima 84'; Seiya Baba (yellow card) 19'	Report	Hiroki Abe (yellow card) 9'	Stadium: Sankyo Frontier Kashiwa Stadium; Attendance: 7,068; Referee: Futoshi Nakamura

9 December Rd of 16	Kashiwa Reysol	–	Fagiano Okayama	Chiba
				Stadium: Sankyo Frontier Kashiwa Stadium

=== J.League Cup ===
3 October Rd 4	Kashiwa Reysol	5–4 (a.e.t.)	Gamba Osaka	Chiba
	Shōta Fujio 28', 59'; Yusuke Segawa 90+3' (pen.); Kenshin Yuba 103', 109'	Report	Issam Jebali 45+3' (pen.), 89'; Welton Felipe 73'; Shogo Sasaki 108' (yellow card) 90+1'; Shuto Abe (yellow card) 99'; Ryō Hatsuse (yellow card) 105'	Stadium: Sankyo Frontier Kashiwa Stadium; Attendance: 10,518; Referee: Hayato Shimizu

11 November Prime Rd QF Leg 1	Kawasaki Frontale	1–2	Kashiwa Reysol	Kawasaki
	Tatsuya Itō 47'; Kyosuke Mochiyama (yellow card) 83'; So Kawahara (yellow card) 90+3'	Report	Hiromu Mitsumaru 84'; Tojiro Kubo 87'; Yusei Yamanouchi (yellow card) 56'; Sachiro Toshima (yellow card) 79'; Yoshio Koizumi (yellow card) 81'; Mao Hosaya (yellow card) 90+3'	Stadium: Kawasaki Todoroki Stadium; Attendance: 11,072; Referee: Akihiko Ikeuchi

15 November Prime Rd QF Leg 2	Kashiwa Reysol	5–4	Kawasaki Frontale	Chiba
	Tojiro Kubo 45+2', 64'; Shōta Fujio 54'; Hinata Yamauchi 60'; Yusuke Segawa 72'	Report	Hiroto Taniguchi 9'; Tatsuya Itō 26'; Yasuto Wakizaka 30'; Shuto Yamaichi 82'; Filip Uremović (yellow card) 26'; Yuki Yamamoto (yellow card) 35'; Yusei Yamanouchi (yellow card) 56'; Sota Miura (yellow card) 88'; Asahi Sasaki (yellow card) 90+1'	Stadium: Sankyo Frontier Kashiwa Stadium; Attendance: 9,189; Referee: Atsushi Kamimura

Kashiwa Reysol won 7–5 on aggregate.

24 March Semi Final Leg 1	Kashiwa Reysol	–	Kashima Antlers	Chiba
				Stadium: Sankyo Frontier Kashiwa Stadium

28 March Semi Final Leg 2	Kashima Antlers	–	Kashiwa Reysol	Kashima
				Stadium: Kashima Soccer Stadium

=== AFC Champions League ===
==== League stage ====
Win Draw Loss

Pos	Team	Pld	W	D	L	GF	GA	GD	Pts	Qualification
2	(Japan) Kashima Antlers	4	3	1	0	11	1	+10	10	Advance to round of 16
3	(Japan) Gamba Osaka	4	2	2	0	11	6	+5	8	Advance to round of 16
4	(Japan) Kashiwa Reysol	4	2	1	1	8	3	+5	7	Advance to round of 16
5	(China) Shanghai Port	4	2	1	1	13	10	+3	7	Advance to round of 16
6	(Japan) Kyoto Sanga	4	2	1	1	6	3	+3	7	Advance to round of 16

Updated to match(es) played on 4 November 2026. Source: AFC
Rules for classification: 1) points; 2) goal difference; 3) number of goals scored; 4) number of matches won; 5) penalty shoot-out if only two teams remain tied and played each other on the final matchday 6) fair play ranking; 7) drawing of lots

15 September 2026 1	Jeonbuk Hyundai Motors (South Korea)	2–1	(Japan) Kashiwa Reysol	Jeonju, South Korea
	Tiago Orobó 49'; Italo 69'; Lee Seung-woo (yellow card) 87'; Kim Yeong-bin (yellow card) 87'; Kim Tae hyeon (yellow card) 87'	Report	Kenshin Yuba 30'; Nobuteru Nakagawa (yellow card) 32'; Koki Kumasaka (yellow card) 90+4'	Stadium: Jeonju World Cup Stadium; Attendance: 4,694; Referee: Alireza Faghani (Australia)

14 October 2026 2	Kashiwa Reysol (Japan)	5–1	(Thailand) Port	Kashiwa, Japan
	Tojiro Kubo 5'; Yuki Kakita 10'; Riki Harakawa 15' (pen.); Koya Yuruki 26'; Hinata Yamauchi 28'; Yusei Yamanouchi (yellow card) 85'	Report	Manuel Bihr 64'	Stadium: Sankyo Frontier Kashiwa Stadium; Attendance: 7,993; Referee: Ammar Mahfoodh (Bahrain)

27 October 2026 3	Ratchaburi (Thailand)	0–0	(Japan) Kashiwa Reysol	Ratchaburi, Thailand
	Ekanit Panya (yellow card) 51'; Tarek Aggoun (yellow card) 79'; Pablo Insua (yellow card) 90+2'	Report		Stadium: Ratchaburi Stadium; Attendance: 3,613; Referee: Majed Al-Shamrani (Saudi Arabia)

4 November 2026 4	Kashiwa Reysol (Japan)	2–0	(South Korea) Daejeon Hana Citizen	Kashiwa, Japan
	Keita Endō 47'; Shōta Fujio 58'; Riki Harakawa (yellow card) 7'; Nobuteru Nakagawa (yellow card) 27'; Kenshin Yuba (yellow card) 90+3'	Report		Stadium: Sankyo Frontier Kashiwa Stadium; Attendance: 10,666; Referee: Alireza Faghani (Australia)

25 November 2026 5	Newcastle Jets (Australia)	–	(Japan) Kashiwa Reysol	Gosford, Australia
				Stadium: Central Coast Stadium

1 December 2026 6	Kashiwa Reysol (Japan)	–	(Vietnam) Cong An Hanoi	Kashiwa, Japan
				Stadium: Sankyo Frontier Kashiwa Stadium

10 February 2027 7	Kashiwa Reysol (Japan)	–	(Thailand) Buriram United	Kashiwa, Japan
				Stadium: Sankyo Frontier Kashiwa Stadium

16 February 2027 8	Pohang Steelers (South Korea)	–	(Japan) Kashiwa Reysol	Pohang, South Korea
				Stadium: Pohang Steel Yard

== Team statistics ==
=== Appearances and goals ===
As of 20 November 2026

No.	Pos.	Player	J1 League		Emperor's Cup		J.League Cup		2026–27 AFC Champions League Elite		Total	
No.	Pos.	Player	Apps	Goals	Apps	Goals	Apps	Goals	Apps	Goals	Apps	Goals
1	GK	(Japan) Haruki Saruta	0	0	0	0	0	0	0	0	0	0
2	DF	(Japan) Hiromu Mitsumaru	2+2	0	1	0	1	1	3+1	0	10	1
3	DF	(Japan) Shogo Asada	0	0	1	0	0	0	0	0	1	0
4	DF	(Japan) Taiyo Koga	14+1	0	1	0	2	0	4	0	22	0
5	FW	(Japan) Keita Endō	13+1	4	0	0	2	0	1+1	1	18	5
6	MF	(Japan) Yuto Yamada	1	0	0	0	1	0	0	0	2	0
8	MF	(Japan) Yoshio Koizumi	13+1	4	0	0	1+1	0	2+1	0	19	4
9	FW	(Japan) Mao Hosoya	0+12	0	1+1	2	0+2	0	0+3	0	19	2
11	MF	(Japan) Masaki Watai	2+4	0	1	0	0	0	0+1	0	8	0
13	DF	(Japan) Tomoya Inukai	1	0	1	0	0	0	0+1	0	3	0
14	FW	(Japan) Tomoaki Ōkubo	0	0	0	0	0	0	0	0	0	0
15	FW	(Japan) Shōta Fujio	6	1	0	0	1	2	2	1	9	4
16	MF	(Japan) Koya Yuruki	1+2	0	0+1	0	0	0	3	1	7	1
17	MF	(Japan) Kohei Tezuka	0	0	0	0	0	0	0	0	0	0
18	FW	(Japan) Yuki Kakita	9	2	0	0	1	0	2	1	12	3
19	MF	(Japan) Hayato Nakama	0+1	0	1+1	0	0+1	0	0	0	4	0
20	MF	(Japan) Yusuke Segawa	0+14	8	1+1	1	0+2	1	0+3	0	20	10
21	MF	(Japan) Yudai Konishi	4+4	0	2	0	1	0	2+1	0	14	0
22	DF	(Japan) Hiroki Noda	0	0	0	0	0	0	0	0	0	0
23	MF	(Japan) Kaiji Chonan	0	0	1+1	1	0	0	0+1	0	3	1
24	MF	(Japan) Tojiro Kubo	10+5	4	1+1	1	2+1	1	3+1	1	24	7
25	GK	(Japan) Haruki Saruta	7	0	0	0	0	0	1	0	8	0
26	DF	(Japan) Daiki Sugioka	13+1	0	0	0	1+1	0	1+1	0	18	0
27	MF	(Japan) Koki Kumasaka	7+1	0	0	0	0	0	0+1	0	9	0
28	MF	(Japan) Sachiro Toshima	6+1	0	0+1	1	1	0	0	0	9	1
29	GK	(Japan) Kengo Nagai	5+1	0	0	0	1	0	3	0	10	0
30	MF	(Japan) Shusuke Furuya	1	0	0	0	0	0	0	0	1	0
32	DF	(Japan) Yusei Yamanouchi	0+1	0	0+1	0	1	0	2+2	0	7	0
33	MF	(Japan) Sota Iwanaga	0	0	0	0	0	0	0	0	0	0
39	MF	(Japan) Nobuteru Nakagawa	14+1	0	0	0	1+1	0	3+1	0	21	0
40	MF	(Japan) Riki Harakawa	0+4	0	2	0	0+1	0	3	1	10	1
42	DF	(Japan) Wataru Harada	10+4	1	0	0	0	0	2	0	16	1
44	MF	(Japan) Kenshin Yuba	5+8	2	2	0	0+1	2	3+1	1	20	5
46	GK	(Japan) Kenta Matsumoto	0	0	0	0	0	0	0	0	0	0
51	FW	(Japan) Makoto Mitsuta	2	0	1+1	0	1	0	0	0	5	0
64	MF	(Japan) Ryo Igarashi	0	0	0+1	0	0	0	0	0	1	0
77	GK	(Japan) Tomoya Wakahara	3	0	2	0	1	0	0	0	6	0
87	MF	(Japan) Hinata Yamauchi	11+2	5	1	0	2	0	3	1	19	6
88	DF	(Japan) Seiya Baba	3+5	0	2	0	1	0	1	0	12	0
