= Riku Ochiai =

Japanese footballer (born 1999)

Riku Ochiai 落合 陸
Personal information
- Date of birth: 23 May 1999 (age 27)
- Place of birth: Chiba, Japan
- Height: 1.75 m (5 ft 9 in)
- Position: Midfielder

Team information
- Current team: Albirex Niigata
- Number: 13

Youth career
- Omagi SSS
- –2017: Kashiwa Reysol

College career
Years	Team	Apps	(Gls)
2019–2022	Tokyo International University		

Senior career*
Years	Team	Apps	(Gls)
2018	Vonds Ichihara	0	(0)
2022–2024	Kashiwa Reysol	4	(0)
2024	→ Mito HollyHock (loan)	31	(5)
2025–	Albirex Niigata	18	(0)
2025	→ Oita Trinita (loan)	10	(0)
- * Club domestic league appearances and goals as of 16 August 2026

Riku Ochiai (落合 陸, Ochiai Riku; born 23 May 1999) is a Japanese professional footballer currently playing as a midfielder for J2 League club Albirex Niigata.

== Career ==
=== Early career ===
Ochiai began his playing career with Kantō Soccer League club Vonds Ichihara where he made his debut playing in the Emperor's Cup. After 3 years at Tokyo International University, in his fourth and final year he was announced as a designated special player for J1 League club Kashiwa Reysol.

=== Kashiwa Reysol ===
He made his debut in February 2022 a 1–1 J.League Cup draw with Kyoto Sanga. He went on to make four appearances during his season as a designated special player.

In the 2023 season, Ochiai scored his first professional goal for Reysol in a 7–1 Emperor's Cup victory over Yamanashi Gakuin University Pegasus. In June 2023, he made his league debut in a 4–3 defeat to Yokohama F. Marinos.

=== Loan to Mito HollyHock ===
In December 2023, it was announced that Ochiai would be moving on loan to J2 League club Mito HollyHock for the 2024 season. He made his debut for the club in February 2024 in a 1–0 league victory over Iwaki FC. He scored his first goal for Mito HollyHock in a 2–2 draw with Tochigi SC. He finished the season with 5 goals in 31 appearances, including a brace against V-Varen Nagasaki in which he scored a spectacular volley for his first goal.

=== Albirex Niigata ===
Following a successful loan to Mito HollyHock, Ochiai transferred to J1 League club Albirex Niigata ahead of the 2025 season.

== Career statistics ==
=== Club ===
As of end of 2024 season

Appearances and goals by club, season and competition
Club	Season	League			National Cup		League Cup		Other		Total	
Club	Season	Division	Apps	Goals	Apps	Goals	Apps	Goals	Apps	Goals	Apps	Goals
Japan			League		Emperor's Cup		J. League Cup		Other		Total	
Vonds Ichihara	2018	KSL	0	0	1	0	–		–		1	0
Tokyo International University	2019	–			1	0	–		–		1	0
Tokyo International University	2020	–			1	0	–		–		1	0
Tokyo International University	Total		0	0	2	0	0	0	0	0	2	0
Kashiwa Reysol	2022	J1 League	0	0	0	0	4	0	–		4	0
Kashiwa Reysol	2023	J1 League	4	0	2	1	2	0	–		8	1
Kashiwa Reysol	Total		4	0	2	1	6	0	0	0	12	1
Mito HollyHock (loan)	2024	J2 League	31	5	0	0	0	0	–		31	5
Albirex Niigata	2025	J1 League	0	0	0	0	0	0	–		0	0
Career total			35	0	5	1	6	0	0	0	46	1
