= Takuto Kato =

Japanese footballer

Personal information
- Full name: Takuto Kato
- Date of birth: 9 May 1999 (age 27)
- Place of birth: Saitama, Japan
- Height: 1.72 m (5 ft 8 in)
- Position: Defensive midfielder

Team information
- Current team: Fukushima United
- Number: 30

Youth career
- FC Habilista
- –2017: Kashiwa Reysol

College career
Years	Team	Apps	(Gls)
2018–2021	University of Tsukuba		

Senior career*
Years	Team	Apps	(Gls)
2021–2023	Kashiwa Reysol	14	(0)
2024–	Fukushima United	0	(0)
- * Club domestic league appearances and goals as of 18:25, 11 September 2023 (UTC)

Takuto Kato (加藤 匠人, Kato Takuto; born 9 May 1999) is a Japanese footballer currently playing as a defensive midfielder for Fukushima United.

== Career statistics ==
=== Club ===
As of 2 March 2022.

Club	Season	League			National Cup		League Cup		Other		Total	
Club	Season	Division	Apps	Goals	Apps	Goals	Apps	Goals	Apps	Goals	Apps	Goals
University of Tsukuba	2020	–			5 (Note: Appearances in the Emperor's Cup)	1	–		0	0	5	1
Kashiwa Reysol	2021	J1 League	0	0	0	0	0	0	0	0	0	0
Kashiwa Reysol	2022	J1 League	11	0	0	0	1 (Note: Appearances in the J.League Cup)	0	0	0	1	0
Kashiwa Reysol	2023	J1 League	2	0	0	0	0	0	0	0	0	0
Kashiwa Reysol	Total		13	0	0	0	1	0	0	0	1	0
Career total			13	0	5	1	1	0	0	0	6	1
