= Koki Kumasaka =

Japanese footballer (born 2001)

Koki Kumasaka 熊坂 光希
Personal information
- Date of birth: 15 April 2001 (age 25)
- Place of birth: Saitama, Japan
- Height: 1.85 m (6 ft 1 in)
- Position: Defensive midfielder

Team information
- Current team: Kashiwa Reysol
- Number: 27

Youth career
- Hikonari FC
- Nansato FC
- Togasaki Eleven SSS
- 2013–2019: Kashiwa Reysol

College career
Years	Team	Apps	(Gls)
2020–2023	Tokyo International University		

Senior career*
Years	Team	Apps	(Gls)
2024–	Kashiwa Reysol	30	(0)

International career^{‡}
2026–	Japan	1	(0)
- * Club domestic league appearances and goals as of 10 August 2026 ‡ National team caps and goals as of 28 September 2026

Koki Kumasaka (熊坂 光希, Kumasaka Kōki; born 15 April 2001) is a Japanese professional footballer who plays as a defensive midfielder for Kashiwa Reysol and the Japan national team.

== Club career ==
=== University football ===
Enrolled at the Tokyo International University, he helped his side to second place in the Kanto University Division 1 League. With four goals and two assists, he was named in the best XI for the league.

=== Kashiwa Reysol ===
Having already played for them for six years during his youth, Kumasaka committed to re-join J1 League club Kashiwa Reysol in July 2023. He made his professional debut in Reysol's 1–1 J1 League draw against Albirex Niigata on 30 March 2024, and went on to appear in the next three matches. An injury during the Chibagin Cup limited his playing time, and his debut season was not seen as successful.

After ten league appearances in 2024, Kumasaka remained in the first team the following season, featuring in Reysol's pre-season preparation before playing ninety minutes in their opening J1 League fixture against Avispa Fukuoka. Following the appointment of Spanish manager Ricardo Rodríguez in February 2025, Kumasaka began to feature a lot more in the Kashiwa Reysol first team, forming a partnership with Riki Harakawa. In March of the same year, he changed his contract type from Pro C to Pro A, having played 450 minutes in the J1 League.

== International career ==
Without having previously represented Japan at youth international level, he was called up to the senior squad in May 2025.

== Style of play ==
Kumasaka primarily plays as a defensive midfielder or deep-lying central midfielder.Standing at 1.85 m, he combines physical strength and a long reach with mobility and technical ability. He is particularly noted for his ball-winning ability, his one-on-one defending and his capacity to cover a large area of the pitch.

Japanese football media have described him as a physically imposing defensive midfielder whose long reach helps him intercept passes and win challenges. His game is not limited to defensive work. Kumasaka is also involved in the build-up phase, where he often positions himself in front of the centre-backs to receive the ball and initiate attacks.

He has been noted for his ability to turn under pressure, play progressive passes and decide whether to play forward or recycle possession depending on the situation. His positioning and distribution have been described as an important part of Kashiwa Reysol's build-up play.

Kumasaka also possesses a high work rate and is capable of contributing across a wide area of the midfield. He has described his own style as dynamic, while his ability to combine physical defending with possession play developed during his university career, following his earlier development in Kashiwa Reysol's academy. His combination of size, defensive ability, mobility and build-up play has attracted attention as a relatively uncommon profile among Japanese midfielders.

== Career statistics ==
=== Club ===
As of 23 May 2025.

Appearances and goals by club, season and competition
Club	Season	League			National Cup (Note: Includes Emperor's Cup)		League Cup (Note: Includes J.League Cup)		Other		Total	
Club	Season	Division	Apps	Goals	Apps	Goals	Apps	Goals	Apps	Goals	Apps	Goals
Kashiwa Reysol	2024	J1 League	10	0	2	0	0	0	0	0	12	0
Kashiwa Reysol	2025	J1 League	17	0	0	0	1	0	0	0	18	0
Career total			27	0	2	0	1	0	0	0	30	0
