= Diego (footballer, born September 1995) =

Brazilian footballer

Personal information
- Full name: Diego Jara Rodrigues
- Date of birth: 21 September 1995 (age 31)
- Place of birth: Corumbá, Brazil
- Height: 1.83 m (6 ft 0 in)
- Position: Left back

Team information
- Current team: Vissel Kobe
- Number: 15

Youth career
- 2013: União São João
- 2013–2014: Metropolitano

Senior career*
Years	Team	Apps	(Gls)
2014–2015	Metropolitano	15	(0)
2015–2018	Joinville	60	(0)
2017	→ Matsumoto Yamaga (loan)	4	(0)
2018	→ Mito HollyHock (loan)	34	(1)
2019–2021	Tokushima Vortis	48	(1)
2022	Sagan Tosu	32	(2)
2023–2025	Kashiwa Reysol	83	(9)
2026–	Vissel Kobe	15	(1)
- * Club domestic league appearances and goals as of 10 August 2026

Diego Jara Rodrigues (born 21 September 1995), commonly known as Diego, is a Brazilian footballer who currently plays as a left back for Vissel Kobe.

== Club career ==
=== Metropolitano ===
Diego made his league debut against Internacional on 4 February 2015.

=== Joinville ===
Diego made his league debut against Sport Recife on 14 June 2015.

=== Matsumoto Yamaga ===
Diego joined Japanese side Matsumoto Yamaga in January 2017, on a one-year loan from Brazilian side Joinville. He made his league debut against Avispa Fukuoka on 7 May 2017.

=== Mito Hollyhock ===
Diego made his league debut against Montedio Yamagata on 25 February 2018. He scored his first goal for the club against Oita Trinita on 29 September 2018, scoring in the 90th+1st minute.

=== Tokushima Vortis ===
Diego made his league debut against Ventforet Kofu on 16 August 2020. He scored his first league goal against Thespa Gunma on 1 November 2020, scoring in the 56th minute.

=== Sagan Tosu ===
Diego joined Sagan Tosu on 25 December 2021. He made his league debut against Sanfrecce Hiroshima on 19 February 2022. He scored his first goal for the club against FC Tokyo on 26 June 2022, scoring in the 48th minute.

=== Kashiwa Reysol ===
Diego joined Kashiwa Reysol on 6 December 2022. He made his league debut against Shonan Bellmare on 8 July 2023. Diego scored his first goal for the club against Avispa Fukuoka on 23 September 2023, scoring in the 13th minute.

== Career statistics ==
=== Club ===
As of match played 30 November 2025.

Appearances and goals by club, season and competition
Club	Season	League			State League		Cup		League Cup		Continental		Other		Total	
Club	Season	Division	Apps	Goals	Apps	Goals	Apps	Goals	Apps	Goals	Apps	Goals	Apps	Goals	Apps	Goals
Metropolitano	2015	Série D	0	0	15 (Note: Appearances in the Campeonato Catarinense)	0	0	0	—		—		—		15	0
Joinville	2015	Série A	25	0	0	0	0	0	—		1 (Note: Appearances in the Copa Sudamericana)	0	—		26	0
Joinville	2016	Série B	17	0	18	0	3 (Note: Appearances in the Copa do Brasil)	0	—		—		—		38	0
Joinville	Total		42	0	18	0	3	0	—		1	0	—		64	0
Matsumoto Yamaga (loan)	2017	J2 League	4	0	—		1 (Note: Appearances in the Emperor's Cup)	0	—		—		—		5	0
Mito HollyHock (loan)	2018	J2 League	34	1	—		1	0	—		—		—		35	1
Tokushima Vortis	2019	J2 League	0	0	—		0	0	—		—		—		0	0
Tokushima Vortis	2020	J2 League	15	1	—		0	0	—		—		—		15	1
Tokushima Vortis	2021	J1 League	33	0	—		2	0	2 (Note: Appearances in the J.League Cup)	0	—		—		37	0
Tokushima Vortis	Total		48	1	—		2	0	2	0	—		—		52	1
Sagan Tosu	2022	J1 League	32	2	—		1	1	1	0	—		—		34	3
Kashiwa Reysol	2023	J1 League	14	1	—		1	0	0	0	—		—		15	1
Kashiwa Reysol	2024	J1 League	36	3	—		2	0	3	0	—		—		41	3
Kashiwa Reysol	2025	J1 League	33	5	—		0	0	10	2	—		—		43	7
Kashiwa Reysol	Total		83	9	—		3	0	13	2	—		—		99	11
Career total			243	13	33	0	10	1	16	2	1	0	0	0	303	16

== Honours ==
Vissel Kobe

- J1 100 Year Vision League: 2026
