= Yuto Yamada =

Japanese footballer

Yuto Yamada 山田 雄士
Personal information
- Full name: Yuto Yamada
- Date of birth: 17 May 2000 (age 26)
- Place of birth: Chiba, Japan
- Height: 1.69 m (5 ft 7 in)
- Position: Defensive midfielder

Team information
- Current team: Kashiwa Reysol
- Number: 6

Youth career
- –2012: FC Takatsu
- 2013–2018: Kashiwa Reysol

Senior career*
Years	Team	Apps	(Gls)
2019–	Kashiwa Reysol	76	(4)
2021–2023	→ Tochigi SC (loan)	25	(2)
- * Club domestic league appearances and goals as of 10 August 2026

Yuto Yamada (山田 雄士, Yamada Yūto; born 17 May 2000) is a Japanese footballer who plays as a defensive midfielder for Kashiwa Reysol.

== Career statistics ==
=== Club ===
As of 3 March 2023.

Appearances and goals by club, season and competition
Club	Season	League			Emperor's Cup		J.League Cup		Other		Total	
Club	Season	Division	Apps	Goals	Apps	Goals	Apps	Goals	Apps	Goals	Apps	Goals
Kashiwa Reysol	2019	J2 League	0	0	0	0	1	0	–		1	0
Kashiwa Reysol	2020	J1 League	1	0	0	0	3	0	–		4	0
Kashiwa Reysol	2021	J1 League	1	0	0	0	0	0	–		1	0
Kashiwa Reysol	2022	J1 League	9	0	1	0	0	0	–		10	0
Kashiwa Reysol	2023	J1 League	2	1	0	0	0	0	–		2	1
Kashiwa Reysol	Total		13	1	1	0	3	0	0	0	18	1
Tochigi SC (loan)	2023	J2 League	24	2	0	0	–		–		24	2
Career total			35	3	1	0	3	0	0	0	42	2
