= Yudai Konishi =

Japanese footballer

Personal information
- Full name: Yudai Konishi
- Date of birth: 18 April 1998 (age 28)
- Place of birth: Awa, Tokushima, Japan
- Height: 1.69 m (5 ft 7 in)
- Position: Forward

Team information
- Current team: Kashiwa Reysol
- Number: 21

Youth career
- Premiere Tokushima
- Gamba Osaka

Senior career*
Years	Team	Apps	(Gls)
2016	→ Gamba Osaka U-23 (loan)	2	(0)
2017–2021	Tokushima Vortis	134	(9)
2022–2025	Montedio Yamagata	99	(4)
2025–	Kashiwa Reysol	20	(1)
- * Club domestic league appearances and goals as of 10 August 2026

Yudai Konishi (小西 雄大, Konishi Yūdai; born 18 April 1998) is a Japanese professional footballer who plays as a forward for Kashiwa Reysol.

== Career ==
Yudai Konishi joined Gamba Osaka in 2016. On 1 May, he debuted in J3 League (v Blaublitz Akita).

== Career statistics ==
Last updated 26 July 2022.

Club performance			League		Cup		League Cup		Other		Total	
Season	Club	League	Apps	Goals	Apps	Goals	Apps	Goals	Apps	Goals	Apps	Goals
Japan			League		Emperor's Cup		League Cup				Total	
2017	Tokushima Vortis	J2 League	13	0	1	0	–		–		14	0
2018	Tokushima Vortis	J2 League	28	3	2	0	–		–		30	3
2019	Tokushima Vortis	J2 League	34	2	0	0	–		3	0	37	2
2020	Tokushima Vortis	J2 League	31	3	2	0	–		–		33	3
2021	Tokushima Vortis	J1 League	28	1	2	0	6	0	–		36	1
2022	Montedio Yamagata	J2 League	20	1	0	0	–		–		20	1
Career total			154	10	7	0	6	0	3	0	170	10

Reserves performance

Club performance			League		Total	
Season	Club	League	Apps	Goals	Apps	Goals
Japan			League		Total	
2016	Gamba Osaka U-23	J3 League	2	0	2	0
Career total			2	0	2	0
