= Mohammad Farzan Sana =

Japanese footballer (born 2004)

Personal information
- Date of birth: 30 June 2004 (age 22)
- Place of birth: Chiba Prefecture, Japan
- Height: 1.75 m (5 ft 9 in)
- Position: Midfielder

Team information
- Current team: Thespa Gunma (on loan from Kashiwa Reysol)
- Number: 19

Youth career
- Takasu SC Hoppers
- Kashiwa Reysol

Senior career*
Years	Team	Apps	(Gls)
2023–	Kashiwa Reysol	3	(0)
2025–	Thespa Gunma (loan)	25	(4)
- * Club domestic league appearances and goals as of 25 August 2026

Mohammad Farzan Sana (Japanese: モハマド ファルザン佐名; born 30 June 2004) is a Japanese professional footballer who plays as a midfielder for J3 League club Thespa Gunma, on loan from Kashiwa Reysol.

== Early life ==
Farzan Sana was born on 30 June 2004. Born in Chiba Prefecture, Japan, he was born to an Indian father and a Japanese mother.

== Career ==
As a youth player, Farzan Sana joined the youth academy of Takasu SC Hoppers. Subsequently, he joined the youth academy of Kashiwa Reysol and was promoted to the club's senior team ahead of the 2023 season. On 8 March 2023, he debuted for them during a 1–1 draw with Kashima Antlers in the J.League Cup. The same year, he suffered a hamstring injury while playing for them.

== Style of play ==
Farzan Sana plays as a midfielder and is right-footed. Japanese news website wrote in 2022 that he "is a midfielder who can make a difference in attacks, mainly playing as an attacking midfielder or inside half. His strong point is breaking through the center with a deflection".

== Career statistics ==
As of 23 March 2026

Appearances and goals by club, season and competition
Club	Season	League			National cup (Note: Includes Emperors Cup)		League cup (Note: Includes J.League Cup)		Total	
Club	Season	Division	Apps	Goals	Apps	Goals	Apps	Goals	Apps	Goals
Kashiwa Reysol	2023	J1 League	3	0	0	0	3	0	6	0
Kashiwa Reysol	2025	J1 League	0	0	1	0	1	0	2	0
Kashiwa Reysol	Total		3	0	1	0	4	0	8	0
Thespa Gunma	2025	J3 League	8	3	–		–		8	3
Thespa Gunma	2026	J2/J3 (100)	4	0	–		–		4	0
Thespa Gunma	Total		12	3	0	0	0	0	12	3
Career total			15	3	1	0	4	0	20	3
