= Masato Sasaki =

Japanese footballer

Masato Sasaki 佐々木 雅士
Personal information
- Date of birth: 1 May 2002 (age 24)
- Place of birth: Matsudo, Chiba, Japan
- Height: 1.85 m (6 ft 1 in)
- Position: Goalkeeper

Team information
- Current team: Iwaki FC (on loan from Kashiwa Reysol)
- Number: 23

Youth career
- Tokiwadaira SSS
- –2021: Kashiwa Reysol

Senior career*
Years	Team	Apps	(Gls)
2021–	Kashiwa Reysol	30	(0)
2025	→ Fagiano Okayama (loan)	0	(0)
2025–	→ Iwaki FC (loan)	41	(0)

International career
2017	Japan U15		
2018	Japan U16	2	(0)
2019	Japan U17		
- * Club domestic league appearances and goals as of 14 August 2026

Masato Sasaki (佐々木 雅士, Sasaki Masato; born 1 May 2002) is a Japanese footballer who plays as a goalkeeper for Iwaki FC, on loan from Kashiwa Reysol.

== Club career ==
On 16 August 2019, Sasaki was registered for the first team as a type-2 player. On 30 December 2020, it was announced that he would be promoted to the first team from the next season. Sasaki made his professional debut in the J.League Cup against Urawa Red Diamonds on 27 March 2021. He made his J League debut against Sanfrecce Hiroshima on 19 June 2021.

On 29 December 2024, Sasaki was announced at Fagiano Okayama on loan.

== International career ==
Sasaki was called up to the Japan U17 squad for the 2019 FIFA U-17 World Cup.

Sasaki was called up to the Japan U23 squad for the 2024 Summer Olympics.

== Career statistics ==
=== Club ===
As of 8 August 2025.

Club	Season	League			National Cup		League Cup		Other		Total	
Club	Season	Division	Apps	Goals	Apps	Goals	Apps	Goals	Apps	Goals	Apps	Goals
Kashiwa Reysol	2021	J1 League	3	0	1 (Note: Appearances in the Emperor's Cup)	0	5 (Note: Appearances in the J.League Cup)	0	0	0	9	0
Kashiwa Reysol	2022	J1 League	18	0	1	0	5	0	0	0	24	0
Kashiwa Reysol	2023	J1 League	3	0	0	0	3	0	0	0	6	0
Kashiwa Reysol	2024	J1 League	4	0	0	0	2	0	0	0	6	0
Fagiano Okayama	2025	J1 League	0	0	0	0	1	0	0	0	1	0
Iwaki FC	2025	J2 League	6	0	0	0	0	0	0	0	6	0
Career total			34	0	2	0	16	0	0	0	52	0

== Honours ==
Japan U16

- AFC U-16 Championship: 2018
