= Hayato Tanaka =

Japanese footballer

Hayato Tanaka 田中 隼人
Personal information
- Full name: Hayato Tanaka
- Date of birth: 1 November 2003 (age 23)
- Place of birth: Chiba, Japan
- Height: 1.88 m (6 ft 2 in)
- Position: Centre back

Team information
- Current team: Tokushima Vortis (on loan from Kashiwa Reysol)
- Number: 2

Youth career
- Minato SC
- –2021: Kashiwa Reysol

Senior career*
Years	Team	Apps	(Gls)
2021–	Kashiwa Reysol	22	(0)
2024	→ V-Varen Nagasaki (loan)	38	(1)
2026	→ Cerezo Osaka (loan)	6	(0)
2026–	→ Tokushima Vortis (loan)	9	(0)
- * Club domestic league appearances and goals as of 16:25, 4 October 2026 (UTC)

Hayato Tanaka (田中 隼人, Tanaka Hayato; born 1 November 2003) is a Japanese footballer currently playing as a centre back for J2 League club Tokushima Vortis, on loan from Kashiwa Reysol.

== Career ==
On 16 October 2020, Tanaka was registered to the first team as a type-2 player.

On 11 January 2024, Tanaka joined V-Varen Nagasaki on loan. On 27 December 2024, he returned to Kashiwa Reysol.

== International career ==
Tanaka was called up to the Japan U-20 squad for the 2023 FIFA U-20 World Cup.

== Career statistics ==
=== Club ===
As of 4 October 2026

Appearances and goals by club, season and competition
Club	Season	League			National cup (Note: Includes Emperor's Cup)		League cup (Note: Includes J.League Cup)		Other		Total	
Club	Season	Division	Apps	Goals	Apps	Goals	Apps	Goals	Apps	Goals	Apps	Goals
Kashiwa Reysol	2021	J1 League	0	0	0	0	3	0	–		3	0
Kashiwa Reysol	2022	J1 League	4	0	1	0	3	0	–		8	0
Kashiwa Reysol	2023	J1 League	3	0	4	0	4	0	–		11	0
Kashiwa Reysol	2025	J1 League	15	0	1	0	1	0	–		17	0
Kashiwa Reysol	Total		22	0	6	0	11	0	0	0	39	0
V-Varen Nagasaki (loan)	2024	J2 League	38	1	2	0	2	0	1 (Note: Appearance in J1/J2 play-offs)	0	43	1
Cerezo Osaka (loan)	2026	J1 (100)	6	0	–		–		–		6	0
Tokushima Vortis (loan)	2026–27	J2 League	9	0	1	0	1	0	–		11	0
Career total			75	1	9	0	14	0	1	0	99	1
