= Ryosuke Kojima =

Japanese footballer (born 1997)

Ryosuke Kojima 小島 亨介
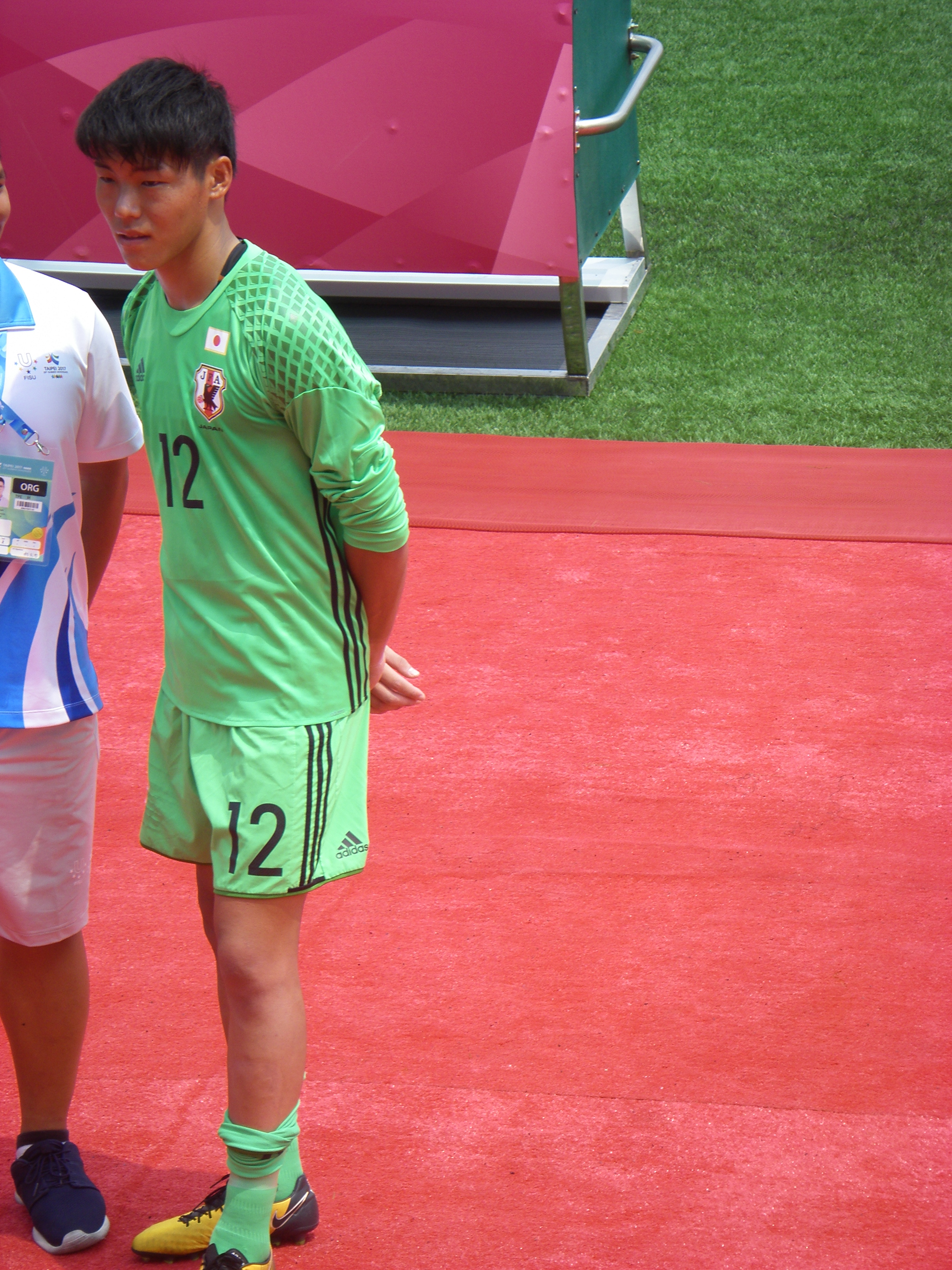
- Ryosuke Kojima representing Japan U20 in 2017.

Personal information
- Full name: Ryosuke Kojima
- Date of birth: January 30, 1997 (age 29)
- Place of birth: Toyota, Aichi, Japan
- Height: 1.83 m (6 ft 0 in)
- Position: Goalkeeper

Team information
- Current team: Kashiwa Reysol
- Number: 25

Youth career
- Shimoyama FC
- –2014: Nagoya Grampus

College career
Years	Team	Apps	(Gls)
2015–2018	Waseda University		

Senior career*
Years	Team	Apps	(Gls)
2019–2021	Oita Trinita	0	(0)
2020–2021	→ Albirex Niigata (loan)	31	(0)
2022–2024	Albirex Niigata	102	(0)
2025-	Kashiwa Reysol	56	(0)

International career
2012–2014	Japan U16/U17		
2015–2017	Japan U18/U19/U20	30	(0)
2018–	Japan U21/U23	16	(0)
Medal record
Representing Japan
Asian Games
Silver medal – second place	2018 Jakarta-Palembang	Team
AFC U-19 Championship
Gold medal – first place	2016 Bahrain
- * Club domestic league appearances and goals as of 10 August 2026

Ryosuke Kojima (小島 亨介, Kojima Ryōsuke; born January 30, 1997) is a Japanese professional footballer who plays as a goalkeeper for J1 League club Kashiwa Reysol.

== Club career ==
After attending Waseda University, Kojima joined Oita Trinita in October 2018 for the 2019 season. After playing two games for Oita, he moved on loan to Albirex Niigata in the J2 League and played there for two seasons before making the move a permanent one for the 2022 season.

Kojima made his debut for Albirex on 23 February 2020, playing the full 90 minutes as they beat Thespakusatsu Gunma 3-0.

Kojima helped Albirex to become J2 League champions with 18 clean sheets in 42 matches and was also named in the J2 League's Best XI.

In January 2025 Kojima was traded to Kashiwa Reysol.

== International career ==
In May 2019, Kojima received his first call-up to the Japan senior national team by head coach Hajime Moriyasu, being included in the final squad for the Copa América in Brazil.

In October 2023, he was called up again to the Samurai Blue squad, replacing injured Daiya Maekawa, for two friendly matches against Canada and Tunisia.

== Club statistics ==
As of 3 December 2023.

Appearances and goals by club, season and competition
Club	Season	League			Cup		League cup		Total	
Club	Season	Division	Apps	Goals	Apps	Goals	Apps	Goals	Apps	Goals
Japan			League		Emperor's Cup		J. League Cup		Total	
Oita Trinita	2019	J1 League	0	0	0	0	2	0	2	0
Albirex Niigata (loan)	2020	J2 League	22	0	0	0	-		22	0
Albirex Niigata (loan)	2021	J2 League	9	0	2	0	-		11	0
Albirex Niigata	2022	J2 League	42	0	0	0	-		42	0
Albirex Niigata	2023	J1 League	30	0	0	0	0	0	30	0
Albirex Niigata	Total		103	0	2	0	0	0	105	0
Career total			103	0	2	0	2	0	107	0

== Honours ==
Albirex Niigata

- J2 League : 2022

Individual

- J2 League Best XI: 2022
- J1 League Save of the Month: February/March 2025,
