= Seiya Baba =

Japanese footballer (born 2001)

Seiya Baba 馬場 晴也
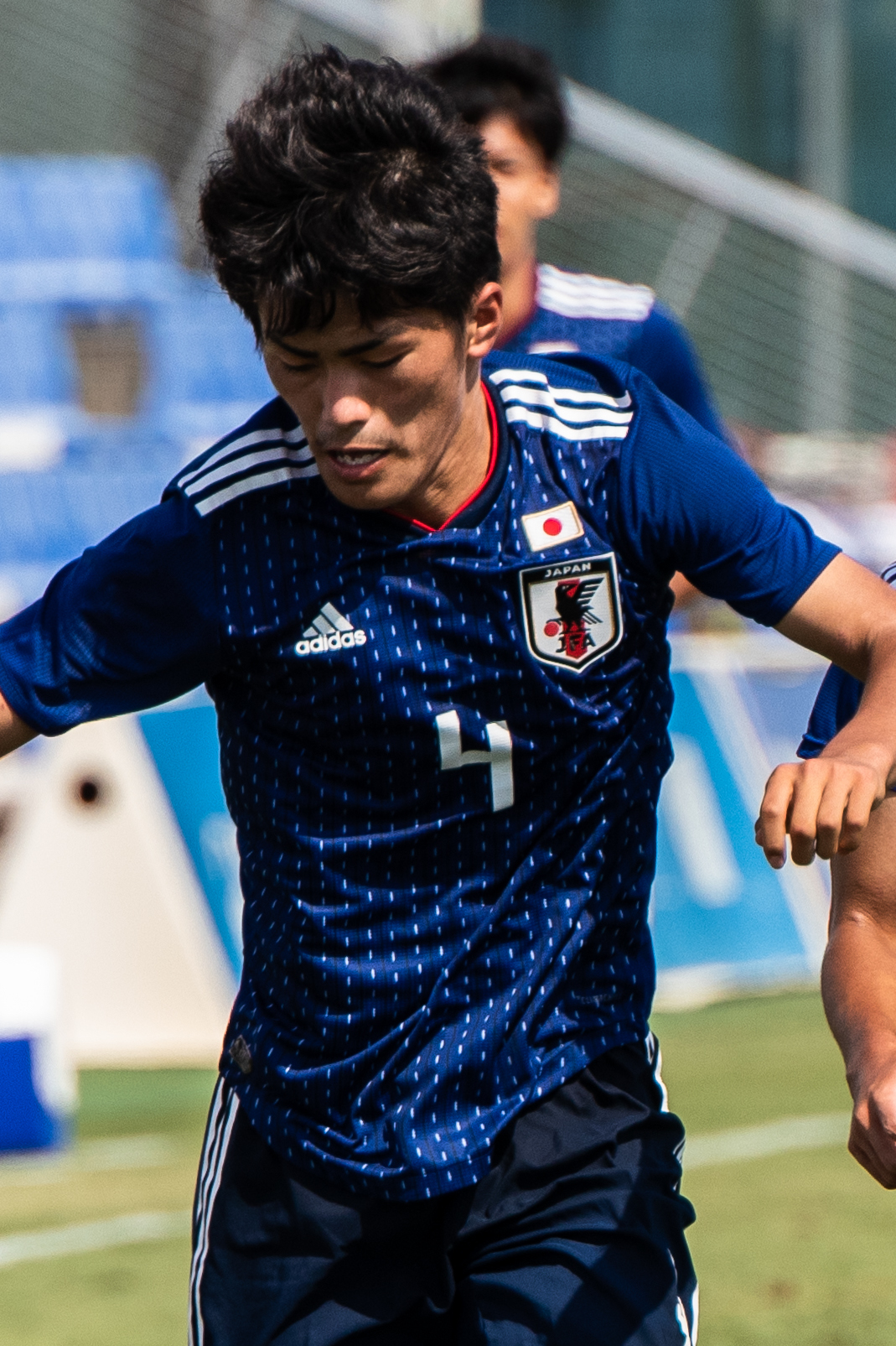
- Baba playing for Japan U19 in 2019

Personal information
- Date of birth: 24 October 2001 (age 25)
- Place of birth: Chiba, Japan
- Height: 1.80 m (5 ft 11 in)
- Position: Centre-back

Team information
- Current team: Kashiwa Reysol
- Number: 88

Youth career
- Refino
- –2019: Tokyo Verdy

Senior career*
| Years | Team | Apps | (Gls) |
| 2020–2022 | Tokyo Verdy | 47 | (0) |
| 2023–2025 | Hokkaido Consadole Sapporo | 67 | (2) |
| 2025– | Kashiwa Reysol | 24 | (0) |

International career^{‡}
| 2016–2018 | Japan U17 | 8 | (0) |
| 2018–2019 | Japan U18 | 4 | (0) |
| 2019– | Japan U20 | | |
- * Club domestic league appearances and goals as of 10 August 2026 ‡ National team caps and goals as of 17:04, 23 June 2021 (UTC)

Seiya Baba (馬場 晴也, Baba Seiya; born 24 October 2001) is a Japanese professional footballer who plays as a centre-back for J1 League club Kashiwa Reysol.

== Career ==
Baba began his professional career with Tokyo Verdy in 2020 after being promoted to the first team.

On 22 December 2022, Baba transferred to J1 club Hokkaido Consadole Sapporo for the upcoming 2023 season.

== International career ==
Baba was part of the Japan squad for the 2022 Asian Games.

== Career statistics ==
As of the end 2022 season.

=== Club ===
Appearances and goals by club, season and competition
| Club | Season | League | | | National Cup | | League Cup | | Other | | Total | |
| Club | Season | Division | Apps | Goals | Apps | Goals | Apps | Goals | Apps | Goals | Apps | Goals |
|---|---|---|---|---|---|---|---|---|---|---|---|---|
| Tokyo Verdy | 2020 | J2 League | 3 | 0 | 0 | 0 | 0 | 0 | 0 | 0 | 3 | 0 |
| Tokyo Verdy | 2021 | J2 League | 13 | 0 | 0 | 0 | 0 | 0 | 0 | 0 | 13 | 0 |
| Tokyo Verdy | 2022 | J2 League | 30 | 0 | 2 (Note: Appearances at the Emperor's Cup) | 0 | 0 | 0 | 0 | 0 | 32 | 0 |
| Hokkaido Consadole Sapporo | 2023 | J1 League | 0 | 0 | 0 | 0 | 0 | 0 | 0 | 0 | 0 | 0 |
| Career total | | | 46 | 0 | 2 | 0 | 0 | 0 | 0 | 0 | 48 | 0 |
