= Wataru Harada =

Japanese footballer

Personal information
- Date of birth: 22 July 1996 (age 30)
- Place of birth: Kobe, Hyōgo, Japan
- Height: 1.78 m (5 ft 10 in)
- Position: Right back

Team information
- Current team: Kashiwa Reysol
- Number: 42

Youth career
- 2003–2008: Kasumigaoka Gakuen SC
- 2009–2011: Vissel Kobe
- 2012–2014: Seiryo High School

College career
Years	Team	Apps	(Gls)
2015–2018	Nippon Sport Science University		

Senior career*
Years	Team	Apps	(Gls)
2019–2021	FC Imabari	71	(8)
2022–2024	Sagan Tosu	88	(4)
2025–	Kashiwa Reysol	46	(2)
- * Club domestic league appearances and goals as of 10 August 2026

Wataru Harada (原田 亘, Harada Wataru; born 22 July 1996) is a Japanese footballer who plays as a right back for J1 League club Kashiwa Reysol.

== Career ==
Wataru made his league debut for Imabari against FC Gifu on the 27 June 2020. He scored his first league goal for the club against Gifu on the 7 October 2020, scoring in the 10th minute.

Wataru made his league debut for Sagan against Sanfrecce Hiroshima on the 19 February 2022. He scored his first league goal for the club against Kyoto Sanga on the 30 September 2023, scoring in the 90th+9th minute.

== Career statistics ==
=== Club ===
As of 19 July 2022.

Club	Season	League			National Cup		League Cup		Other		Total	
Club	Season	Division	Apps	Goals	Apps	Goals	Apps	Goals	Apps	Goals	Apps	Goals
FC Imabari	2019	JFL	30	4	0	0	–		0	0	30	4
FC Imabari	2020	J3 League	28	3	0	0	–		0	0	28	3
FC Imabari	2021	J3 League	13	1	0	0	–		0	0	13	1
Sagan Tosu	2022	J1 League	16	0	3	0	5	0	0	0	21	0
Career total			87	8	3	0	5	0	0	0	92	8
