= Hiromu Mitsumaru =

Japanese footballer

Hiromu Mitsumaru 三丸 拡
Personal information
- Full name: Hiromu Mitsumaru
- Date of birth: 6 July 1993 (age 33)
- Place of birth: Tochigi, Japan
- Height: 1.72 m (5 ft 8 in)
- Position: Left-back

Team information
- Current team: Kashiwa Reysol
- Number: 2

Youth career
- Kawai SSS
- –2005: Oya Kita FC
- 2006–2008: Oyama Daisan Junior High School
- 2009–2011: Mooka High School

College career
Years	Team	Apps	(Gls)
2012–2015	University of Tsukuba		

Senior career*
Years	Team	Apps	(Gls)
2016–2019	Sagan Tosu	44	(0)
2020–	Kashiwa Reysol	148	(3)
- * Club domestic league appearances and goals as of 10 August 2026

Hiromu Mitsumaru (三丸 拡, Mitsumaru, Hiromu; born 6 July 1993 in Tochigi) is a Japanese footballer who plays as a left-back for Kashiwa Reysol.

== Club statistics ==
Updated to 8 December 2024.

Club	Season	League			Cup		League Cup		Total	
Club	Season	Division	Apps	Goals	Apps	Goals	Apps	Goals	Apps	Goals
Japan			League		Emperor's Cup		J. League Cup		Total	
Sagan Tosu	2016	J1 League	3	0	2	0	2	0	7	0
Sagan Tosu	2017	J1 League	6	0	0	0	5	0	11	0
Sagan Tosu	2018	J1 League	9	0	2	0	6	1	17	1
Sagan Tosu	2019	J1 League	26	0	3	0	1	0	30	0
Sagan Tosu	Total		44	0	7	0	14	1	65	1
Kashiwa Reysol	2020	J1 League	20	0	—		2	0	22	0
Kashiwa Reysol	2021	J1 League	28	1	2	1	2	0	40	2
Kashiwa Reysol	2022	J1 League	31	1	2	0	2	0	35	1
Kashiwa Reysol	2023	J1 League	29	0	4	0	4	0	37	0
Kashiwa Reysol	2024	J1 League	6	0	1	0	3	0	10	0
Kashiwa Reysol	Total		111	2	9	1	13	0	133	3
Career total			155	2	16	1	27	1	198	4
