= Tokyo International University =

Private university in Tokyo, Japan

- 東京国際大学
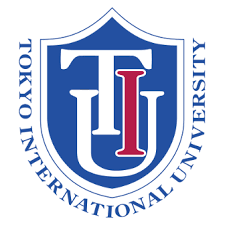
- Official logo
- Former name: International College of Commerce (国際商科大学 Kokusai Shōka Daigaku)
- Motto: Nurturing truly international-minded people
- Type: Private
- Established: 1965
- Founder: Taizō Kaneko
- Religious affiliation: Nonsectarian
- Chancellor: Nobuyasu Kurata
- Administrative staff: 400
- Students: 7,821
- Location: 4-42-31 Higashi-Ikebukuro, Toshima, Tokyo, 170-0013, Japan
- Colors: Blue, red, and white
- Website: https://www.tiu.ac.jp
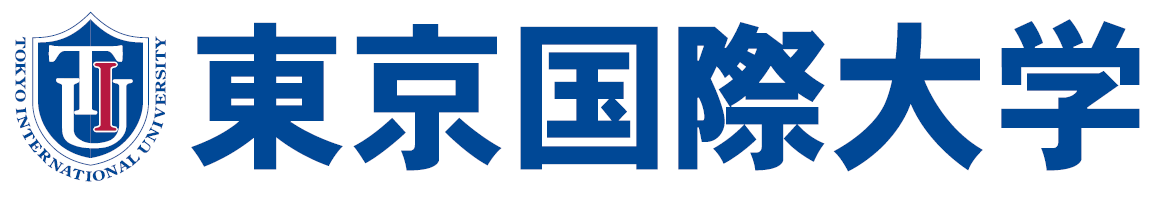

Tokyo International University (TIU) (東京国際大学, Tōkyō Kokusai Daigaku) is a private, research-oriented liberal arts university which was founded in 1965. Its main campus is located in Toshima, Tokyo, where it moved from its original location in Kawagoe, Saitama Prefecture.

== History ==
The university was founded in 1965 by Taizō Kaneko (金子泰藏) as International College of Commerce (国際商科大学, Kokusai Shōka Daigaku). The International College of Commerce was established on the site of what is today TIU’s Campus 1 in Kawagoe.

In 1986, the International College of Commerce was renamed Tokyo International University (東京国際大学, Tōkyō Kokusai Daigaku). In 1989, Tokyo International University of America (TIUA), along with an American Studies Program, was established in partnership with Willamette University in Salem, Oregon. In 2018, the program celebrated its 30th class of students.

In 2014, TIU launched the English Track (E-Track) Program. This program provides Japanese and international students with bachelor's, master's, and doctoral degrees courses in an all-English curriculum. TIU began to offer new undergraduate IT courses and a new master of science major in Digital Business and Innovation in April 2018. In 2019, the E-Track Alumni Association was established to connect students with E-Track’s growing international network of graduates.

== Graduate schools ==
- Graduate School of Commerce
- Graduate School of Clinical Psychology
- Graduate School of Economics (English-medium program and Japanese program)
- Graduate School of International Relations (English-medium program and Japanese program)

== Undergraduate schools ==
- Faculty of Commerce
- Faculty of Economics
- Faculty of Health and Medical Sciences
- Faculty of Language Communication
- Faculty of International Relations
- Faculty of Humanities and Social Sciences

== Campus ==
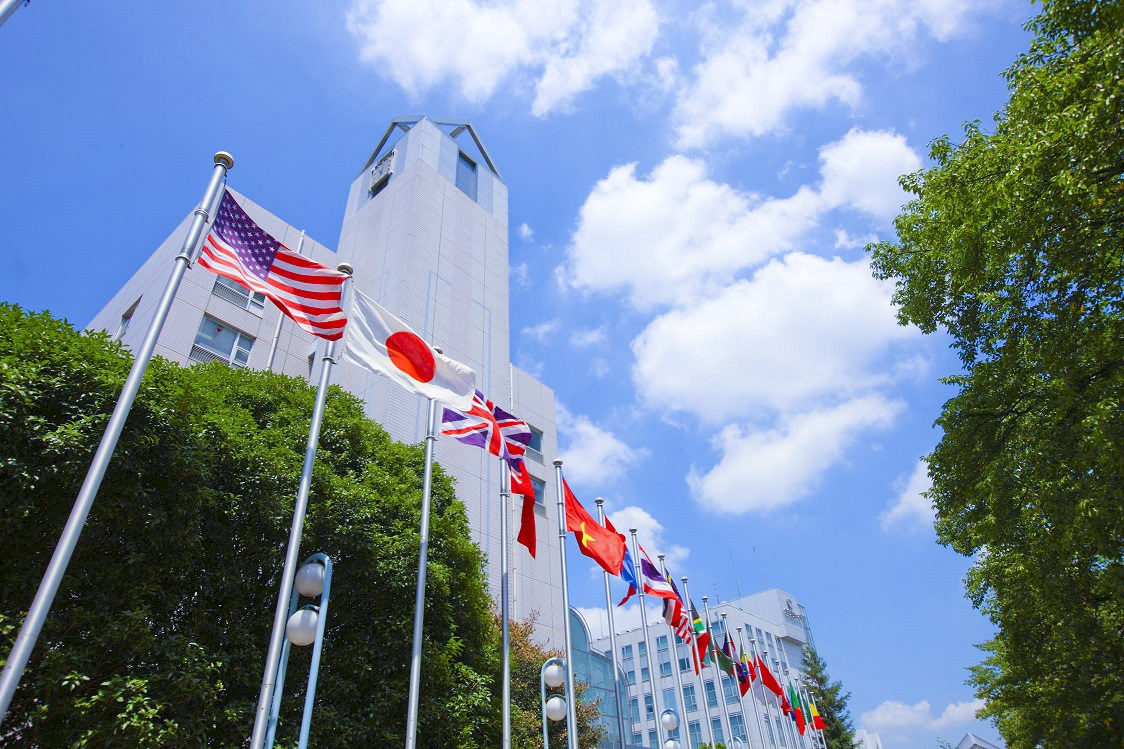
Campus 1, Kawagoe

In 2023, Tokyo International University established a new Global Campus in Ikebukuro. Located near one of the busiest hubs of Tokyo, the Ikebukuro Campus hosts the university's international programs. The land where the Ikebukuro campus was built was acquired through a bidding process to redevelop the Tokyo Mint Bureau site, following the mint's relocation to Saitama in 2012. TIU's plan won this competition. The land, which neighbors Sunshine City, was passed over to the university in October 2020, and the campus facilities opened in September 2023.

The English Track Program, as well as other educational globalization functions, are hosted at Ikebukuro campus. The Ikebukuro campus also hosts the International Relations and Language Communications Faculties.

== Institute for International Strategy ==
TIU has an affiliated think tank, the Institute for International Strategy. The IIS was founded to conduct interdisciplinary research on issues of strategic international importance from global and Japanese perspectives. It has established an international and local network of researchers and practitioners in the many fields of international affairs - politics, diplomacy and security, business and economics, and public policy.

The Institute's International Relations faculty hosts the Global Dialogue visiting speaker series. Recent guest speakers include Daniel R. Russel, former U.S. assistant secretary of state for East Asia and special assistant to U.S. President Barack Obama, who played a leading role in the U.S.' Asia pivot strategy.

In 2021, TIU's IIS became an official collaborating institution of the European Council for Nuclear Research/ Conseil Européen pour la Recherche Nucléaire (CERN)'s Future Circular Collider (FCC) study. TIU is one of only three Japanese institutions collaborating on this project alongside the High Energy Accelerator Research Organization and the University of Tokyo.

== Alumni ==
- Hidenori Iwasaki, composer
- Koki Kumasaka, footballer ( Japan national football team )
- Hiroji Miyamoto, musician (Elephant Kashimashi)
- Daisuke Namikawa, voice actor
- Kenji Ōtsuki, musician (Kinniku Shōjo Tai)
- Toku, musician
- Hideo Yokoyama, novelist.
