= Riki Harakawa =

Japanese footballer

Riki Harakawa 原川 力
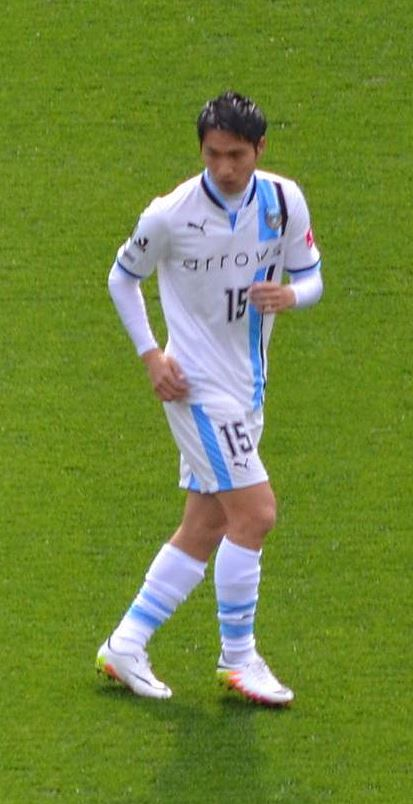
- Harakawa in 2016

Personal information
- Full name: Riki Harakawa
- Date of birth: 18 August 1993 (age 33)
- Place of birth: Yamaguchi, Japan
- Height: 1.75 m (5 ft 9 in)
- Position: Midfielder

Team information
- Current team: Kashiwa Reysol
- Number: 40

Youth career
- 1997–2008: Leone Yamaguchi
- 2009–2011: Kyoto Sanga FC

Senior career*
Years	Team	Apps	(Gls)
2012–2015	Kyoto Sanga FC	39	(0)
2014	→ Ehime FC (loan)	32	(1)
2014–2015	→ J. League U-22 (loan)	1	(0)
2016–2017	Kawasaki Frontale	4	(0)
2017	→ Sagan Tosu (loan)	33	(7)
2018–2020	Sagan Tosu	88	(9)
2021–2024	Cerezo Osaka	51	(2)
2023–2024	→ FC Tokyo (loan)	10	(1)
2024	FC Tokyo	25	(1)
2025–	Kashiwa Reysol	25	(0)

International career
2016	Japan U-23	1	(0)
Medal record
Kawasaki Frontale
Runner-up	Emperor's Cup	2016
Representing Japan
AFC U-23 Championship
Gold medal – first place	2016 Qatar
- * Club domestic league appearances and goals as of 10 August 2026

Riki Harakawa (原川 力, Harakawa Riki; born 18 August 1993) is a Japanese footballer who plays as a midfielder for Kashiwa Reysol.

== Career ==
=== Kyoto Sanga ===
On 6 December 2011, Harakawa was promoted to the first team. He made his league debut against Ehime FC on 22 July 2012.

=== Loan to Ehime ===
On 8 January 2014, Harakawa was announced at Ehime on loan. made his league debut for Ehime against Yokohama FC on 2 March 2014. He scored his first goal against Hokkaido Consadole Sapporo on 26 July 2014, scoring in the 50th minute.

=== Kawasaki Frontale ===
On 24 December 2015, Harakawa was announced at Kawasaki Frontale. He made his league debut against Sagan Tosu on 10 April 2016.

=== Sagan Tosu ===
On 9 December 2017, Harakawa was announced at Sagan Tosu. He scored on his league debut for Sagan against Kashiwa Reysol on 25 February 2017, scoring in the 38th minute.

=== Cerezo Osaka ===
Harakawa made his league debut against Kashiwa Reysol on 27 February 2021. He scored his first goal against FC Tokyo on the 6 March 2021, scoring in the 57th minute.

=== Loan to FC Tokyo ===
On 24 July 2023, Harakawa was announced on loan at FC Tokyo. He made his league debut against Yokohama F. Marinos on 9 August 2023. He scored his first goal for the club against Gamba Osaka on 1 October 2023, scoring in the 37th minute.

=== FC Tokyo ===
On 18 December 2023, Harakawa was announced at FC Tokyo on a permanent deal.

== National team career ==
In August 2016, Harakawa was selected in the Japan U-23 national team for the 2016 Summer Olympics. At this tournament, he played 1 match against Nigeria in the first group stage match.

== Club statistics ==
Updated to 24 February 2019.

Club	Season	League		Cup^{1}		League Cup^{2}		Total	
Club	Season	Apps	Goals	Apps	Goals	Apps	Goals	Apps	Goals
Kyoto Sanga FC	2012	3	0	0	0	-		3	0
Kyoto Sanga FC	2013	7	0	1	0	-		8	0
Ehime FC	2014	32	1	0	0	-		32	1
Kyoto Sanga FC	2015	29	0	3	0	-		32	0
Kawasaki Frontale	2016	4	0	2	0	2	0	8	0
Sagan Tosu	2017	33	7	1	0	2	0	36	7
Sagan Tosu	2018	29	2	3	1	1	0	33	3
Total		137	10	10	1	5	0	152	11

^{1}Includes Emperor's Cup.

^{2}Includes J. League Cup.

== Honours ==
=== International ===
Japan U-23

- AFC U-23 Championship: 2016
