= 2024 FC Tokyo season =

FC Tokyo
2024 season
- Manager: Peter Cklamovski
- Stadium: Ajinomoto Stadium (Chofu); Japan National Stadium (Shinjuku, selected matches)
- J1 League: 7th
- Emperor's Cup: Third round
- J.League Cup: Playoff round
- Top goalscorer: League: Ryotaro Araki (7 goals); All: Ryotaro Araki; Diego Oliveira (7 goals)
- Highest home attendance: 57,885 vs Albirex Niigata (13 July; J1 League)
- Lowest home attendance: 15,828 vs Consadole Sapporo (26 June; J1 League); 4,040 vs Veertien Mie (12 June, Emperor's Cup)
- Average home league attendance: 35,205
- Biggest win: 4–0 vs YSCC Yokohama (17 April; J.League Cup)
- Biggest defeat: 0–3 vs Kawasaki Frontale (30 March, 12 August; J1 League); 0–3 vs Machida Zelvia (9 November; J1 League)
Home colours	Away colours

The 2024 FC Tokyo season was their 89th season in existence and the 14th consecutive season in the J1 League, since the club earned promotion back to it on 2012. In addition to the league, the club competed in the Emperor's Cup and the J. League Cup.

== Players ==
=== Current squad ===
As of 9 August 2024.

All players that have been registered to play during the season.

Players' ages here are displayed as of the opening of the J1 season, 24 February 2024.

No.	Pos.	Nat.	Player	Date of birth (age)	Joined	Last club / U-18 club
Goalkeepers
1	GK	(Japan)	Tsuyoshi Kodama	28 December 1987 (aged 36)	2019	Last: (Japan) Montedio Yamagata; U18: (Japan) Kyoto Sanga
13	GK	(Japan)	Go Hatano	25 May 1998 (aged 25)	2017	Last: (Japan) FC Tokyo U-18; U18: (Japan) FC Tokyo
31	GK	(Japan)	Masataka Kobayashi	20 September 2005 (aged 18)	2024	Last: (Japan) FC Tokyo U-18; U18: (Japan) FC Tokyo
41	GK	(Japan)	Taishi Brandon Nozawa	25 December 2002 (aged 21)	2020	Last: (Japan) FC Tokyo U-18; U18: (Japan) FC Tokyo
51	GK	(Japan)	Wataru Goto (T2)	8 May 2006 (aged 17)	2025	Last: – U18: (Japan) FC Tokyo
Defenders
2	DF	(Japan)	Hotaka Nakamura	12 August 1997 (aged 26)	2019	Last: (Japan) Meiji University; U18: (Japan) Nihon Fujisawa HS
3	DF	(Japan)	Masato Morishige (C)	21 May 1987 (aged 36)	2010	Last: (Japan) Oita Trinita; U18: (Japan) Hiroshima Minami HS
4	DF	(Japan)	Yasuki Kimoto	6 August 1993 (aged 30)	2022	Last: (Japan) Nagoya Grampus; U18: (Japan) Shizuoka Gakuen HS
5	DF	(Japan)	Yuto Nagatomo	12 September 1986 (aged 37)	2021	Last: (France) Olympique de Marseille; U18: (Japan) Higashi Fukuoka HS
30	DF	(Japan)	Teppei Oka	6 September 2001 (aged 22)	2024	Last: (Japan) Meiji University; U18: (Japan) FC Tokyo
32	DF	(Japan)	Kanta Doi	10 November 2004 (aged 19)	2023	Last: (Japan) FC Tokyo U-18; U18: (Japan) FC Tokyo
43	DF	(Japan)	Shuhei Tokumoto	12 September 1995 (aged 28)	2023	Last: (Japan) Fagiano Okayama; U18: (Japan) Naha Nishi HS
44	DF	(Brazil)	Henrique Trevisan	20 January 1997 (aged 27)	2022	Last: (Portugal) Estoril; U18: (Brazil) Figueirense
49	DF	(Japan)	Kashif Bangnagande	24 September 2001 (aged 22)	2020	Last: (Japan) FC Tokyo U-18; U18: (Japan) FC Tokyo
50	DF	(Japan)	Renta Higashi	17 June 2004 (aged 19)	2023	Last: (Japan) FC Tokyo U-18; U18: (Japan) FC Tokyo
Midfielders
8	MF	(Japan)	Takahiro Ko	20 April 1998 (aged 25)	2024	Last: (Japan) Albirex Niigata; U18: (Japan) Ichiritsu Funabashi HS
10	MF	(Japan)	Keigo Higashi	20 July 1990 (aged 33)	2013	Last: (Japan) Omiya Ardija; U18: (Japan) Oita Trinita
17	MF	(Japan)	Tsubasa Terayama	10 April 2000 (aged 23)	2023	Last: (Japan) Juntendo University; U18: (Japan) FC Tokyo
22	MF	(Japan)	Keita Endo	22 November 1997 (aged 26)	2024	Last: (Germany) 1.FC Union Berlin; U18: (Japan) Yokohama F. Marinos
23	MF	(Japan)	Ryunosuke Sato	16 October 2006 (aged 17)	2024	Last: (Japan) FC Tokyo U-18; U18: (Japan) FC Tokyo
27	MF	(Japan)	Kyota Tokiwa (DSP)	9 April 2002 (aged 21)	2025	Last: (Japan) Meiji University; U18: (Japan) FC Tokyo
33	MF	(Japan)	Kota Tawaratsumida	14 May 2004 (aged 19)	2023	Last: (Japan) FC Tokyo U-18; U18: (Japan) FC Tokyo
37	MF	(Japan)	Kei Koizumi (VC)	20 April 1995 (aged 28)	2023	Last: (Japan) Sagan Tosu; U18: (Japan) RKU Kashiwa HS
40	MF	(Japan)	Riki Harakawa	18 August 1993 (aged 30)	2024	Last: (Japan) Cerezo Osaka; U18: (Japan) Kyoto Sanga
48	MF	(Japan)	Yuta Arai	13 June 2004 (aged 19)	2023	Last: (Japan) Shohei HS; U18: (Japan) Shohei HS
53	MF	(Japan)	Shuto Nagano (T2)	15 April 2006 (aged 17)	–	Last: – U18: (Japan) FC Tokyo
54	MF	(Japan)	Yui Nakano (T2)	9 June 2006 (aged 17)	–	Last: – U18: (Japan) FC Tokyo
71	MF	(Japan)	Ryotaro Araki (on loan)	29 January 2002 (aged 22)	–	Last: (Japan) Kashima Antlers; U18: (Japan) Higashi Fukuoka HS
98	MF	(Brazil)	Everton Galdino	17 March 1997 (aged 26)	–	Last: (Brazil) Grêmio; U18: (Brazil) Vila Nova
Forwards
9	FW	(Brazil)	Diego Oliveira	22 June 1990 (aged 33)	2019	Last: (Japan) Kashiwa Reysol; U18: (Brazil) Paraná
11	FW	(Japan)	Tsuyoshi Ogashiwa	9 July 1998 (aged 25)	2024	Last: (Japan) Consadole Sapporo; U18: (Japan) Omiya Ardija
14	FW	(Japan)	Keita Yamashita	13 March 1996 (aged 27)	2022	Last: (Japan) Sagan Tosu; U18: (Japan) Kyushu IU HS
28	FW	(Japan)	Leon Nozawa	21 July 2003 (aged 20)	2022	Last: (Japan) FC Tokyo U-18; U18: (Japan) FC Tokyo
38	FW	(Japan)	Soma Anzai	29 September 2002 (aged 21)	2024	Last: (Japan) Waseda University; U18: (Japan) Aomori Yamada HS
39	FW	(Japan)	Teruhito Nakagawa	27 July 1992 (aged 31)	2022	Last: (Japan) Yokohama F. Marinos; U18: (Japan) Kawasaki Frontale
52	FW	(Japan)	Rui Asada (T2)	13 December 2006 (aged 17)	–	Last: – U18: (Japan) FC Tokyo
55	FW	(Japan)	Divine Chinedu Otani (T2)	4 May 2007 (aged 16)	–	Last: – U18: (Japan) FC Tokyo

=== Out on loan ===
No.	Pos.	Nat.	Player	Date of birth (age)	Joined on	On loan at
18	MF	(Japan)	Manato Shinada	19 September 1999 (aged 24)	2018	(Japan) JEF United Chiba
45	DF	(Japan)	Kojiro Yasuda	14 August 2003 (aged 20)	2021	(Japan) Tegevajaro Miyazaki
70	MF	(Brazil)	Jája Silva	12 November 1998 (aged 25)	2023	(Japan) Sagan Tosu
–	DF	(South Korea)	Baek In-hwan	15 September 2005 (aged 18)	2024	(Japan) Zweigen Kanazawa
–	DF	(Japan)	Sodai Hasukawa	27 June 1998 (aged 25)	2016	(Japan) Shimizu S-Pulse
–	DF	(Japan)	Rio Omori	21 July 2002 (aged 21)	2021	(Japan) Iwaki FC
–	DF	(Japan)	Shuto Okaniwa	16 September 1999 (aged 24)	2016	(Japan) JEF United Chiba
–	MF	(Japan)	Yuki Kajiura	2 January 2004 (aged 20)	2021	(Japan) Zweigen Kanazawa
–	MF	(Japan)	Hisatoshi Nishido	27 March 2001 (aged 22)	2023	(Japan) FC Gifu
–	MF	(Japan)	Koki Tsukagawa	16 July 1994 (aged 29)	2022	(Japan) Kyoto Sanga
–	FW	(Japan)	Naoki Kumata	2 August 2004 (aged 19)	2023	(Japan) Iwaki FC

== Transfers ==
=== Arrivals ===
Date	Position	Player	Joined from	Type	Source
19 June 2023	DF	(Japan) Teppei Oka	(Japan) Meiji University	Full	
5 December 2023	MF	(Japan) Takahiro Ko	(Japan) Albirex Niigata	Full	
18 December 2023	MF	(Japan) Riki Harakawa	(Japan) Cerezo Osaka	Full	
22 December 2023	GK	(Japan) Go Hatano	(Japan) V-Varen Nagasaki	Loan return	
24 December 2023	MF	(Japan) Ryotaro Araki	(Japan) Kashima Antlers	Loan	
25 December 2023	FW	(Japan) Tsuyoshi Ogashiwa	(Japan) Hokkaido Consadole Sapporo	Full	
28 December 2023	DF	(Japan) Renta Higashi	(Japan) SC Sagamihara	Loan return	
6 January 2024	FW	(Japan) Leon Nozawa	(Japan) Matsumoto Yamaga	Loan return	
7 January 2024	MF	(Japan) Keita Endo	(Germany) 1. FC Union Berlin	Loan	
10 January 2024	MF	(Japan) Kojiro Yasuda	(Japan) Tochigi SC	Loan return	
10 January 2024	MF	(Japan) Manato Shinada	(Japan) Ventforet Kofu	Loan return	
31 January 2024	DF	(South Korea) Baek In-hwan	(South Korea) Cheonan Jeil High School	Full	
7 February 2024	MF	(Japan) Soma Anzai	(Japan) Waseda University	Full	
30 May 2024	MF	(Japan) Kyota Tokiwa	(Japan) Meiji University	DSP	
9 August 2024	MF	(Brazil) Everton Galdino	(Brazil) Grêmio	Loan	

=== Departures ===
Date	Position	Player	To	Type	Source
2 December 2023	FW	(Brazil) Pedro Perotti	(Brazil) Chapecoense	Loan return	
21 December 2023	DF	(Japan) Rio Omori	(Japan) Iwaki FC	Loan	
22 December 2023	DF	(Japan) Seiji Kimura	(Japan) Sagan Tosu	Loan	
27 December 2023	MF	(Japan) Takuya Uchida	(Japan) Nagoya Grampus	Full	
28 December 2023	DF	(Japan) Sodai Hasukawa	(Japan) Shimizu S-Pulse	Loan	
5 January 2024	MF	(Japan) Hisatoshi Nishido	(Japan) Kagoshima United	Loan	
5 January 2024	MF	(Brazil) Arthur Silva	(Japan) Omiya Ardija	Full	
6 January 2024	DF	(Japan) Shuto Okaniwa	(Japan) JEF United Chiba	Loan	
7 January 2024	DF	(Japan) Ryoma Watanabe	(Japan) Urawa Red Diamonds	Full	
10 January 2023	MF	(Brazil) Adaílton	(Japan) Ventforet Kofu	Full	
10 January 2024	MF	(Japan) Koki Tsukagawa	(Japan) Kyoto Sanga	Loan	
23 January 2024	GK	(Poland) Jakub Słowik	(Turkey) Konyaspor	Full	
26 January 2024	FW	(Japan) Naoki Kumata	(Belgium) KRC Genk	Loan	
31 January 2024	DF	(South Korea) Baek In-hwan	(Japan) Zweigen Kanazawa	Loan	
27 February 2024	MF	(Japan) Takuya Aoki	(Japan) FC Gifu	Full	
19 March 2024	MF	(Japan) Kojiro Yasuda	(Japan) Tegevajaro Miyazaki	Loan	
26 March 2024	MF	(Japan) Manato Shinada	(Japan) JEF United Chiba	Loan	
4 June 2024	DF	(Japan) Ryoya Ogawa	(Belgium) Sint-Truiden	Full	
30 July 2024	MF	(Japan) Kuryu Matsuki	(England) Southampton	Full	
5 August 2024	MF	(Brazil) Jája Silva	(Japan) Sagan Tosu	Loan	
8 August 2024	MF	(Japan) Hisatoshi Nishido	(Japan) FC Gifu	Loan	
9 August 2024	MF	(Japan) Naoki Kumata	(Japan) Iwaki FC	Loan	

== Friendlies ==
23 February Training match	FC Tokyo	8–2	FC Ryukyu
--:-- JST	Endo 7'; Nakagawa 16'; Diego Oliveira 29'; Matsuki 51'; Shirai 89'; Tawaratsumida 93', 101'; Anzai 132'	Report	Goal 72', 81'
Note: The match consisted of three halves of 45 minutes.

3 February Training match	FC Tokyo	2–1	Sanfrecce Hiroshima
--:-- JST	Doi 25'; Diego Oliveira 104'	Report	Goal 143'
Note: The match consisted of four halves of 30 minutes.

10 February Training match	FC Tokyo	5–4	Yokohama FC
--:-- JST	Diego Oliveira 5', 57'; Endo 7'; Anzai 109'; Yasuda 177'	Report	Goal 44', 81', 90+3', 145'
Note: The match consisted of four halves of 45 minutes.

17 February Training match	FC Tokyo	2–1	Urawa Red Diamonds
--:-- JST	Shinada; Nakagawa	Report
Note: The match consisted of four halves of 45 minutes.

25 February Training match	FC Tokyo	2–0	SC Sagamihara
--:-- JST	Ogashiwa 23'; Sato 53'	Report
Note: The match consisted of two halves of 45 minutes.

3 March Training match	FC Tokyo	1–0	Omiya Ardija
--:-- JST	Oka 45+3'	Report
Note: The match consisted of two halves of 45 minutes.

10 March Training match	FC Tokyo	3–1	Yokohama FC
--:-- JST	Tawaratsumida 4'; Ogashiwa 23', 41'	Report	Goal 5'
Note: The match consisted of two halves of 45 minutes.

== Competitions ==
=== Overall record ===
Competition	First match	Last match	Starting round	Record							
Competition	First match	Last match	Starting round	Pld	W	D	L	GF	GA	GD	Win %
J1 League	24 February	7 December	Matchday 1	36	14	9	13	49	49	+0	38.89
Emperor's Cup	12 June	10 July	Second round	2	1	0	1	4	2	+2	50.00
J.League Cup	17 April	9 June	First round	4	1	1	2	7	6	+1	25.00
Total				42	16	10	16	60	57	+3	38.10

Source: Competitions

=== J1 League ===
==== League table ====
Pos	Team	Pld	W	D	L	GF	GA	GD	Pts
5	Kashima Antlers	38	18	11	9	60	41	+19	65
6	Tokyo Verdy	38	14	14	10	51	51	0	56
7	FC Tokyo	38	15	9	14	53	51	+2	54
8	Kawasaki Frontale	38	13	13	12	66	57	+9	52
9	Yokohama F. Marinos	38	15	7	16	61	62	−1	52

Source: JLeague.co, JLeague.jp, J.League Data Site
Rules for classification: 1) Points; 2) Goal difference; 3) Goals scored; 4) Head-to-head points; 5) Head-to-head goal difference; 6) Head-to-head goals scored; 7) Fewer disciplinary points.

==== Results summary ====
Overall								Home						Away					
Pld	W	D	L	GF	GA	GD	Pts	W	D	L	GF	GA	GD	W	D	L	GF	GA	GD
36	14	9	13	49	49	0	51	6	6	6	22	21	+1	8	3	7	27	28	−1

Last updated: 10 November 2024.
Source: J.League

==== Matches ====
As the J1 League have 20 teams, FC Tokyo will play 38 league matches, starting on 24 February and ending on 7 December.

24 February 1	Cerezo Osaka	2–2	FC Tokyo	Osaka
15:03 JST	Capixaba 27'; Tanaka 51'	Report	Araki (yellow card) 20' (goal) 34', 75'; Nagatomo (yellow card) 44'; Jája (yellow card) 72'; Henrique Trevisan (yellow card) 85'	Stadium: Yodoko Sakura Stadium; Attendance: 20,705; Referee: Yudai Yamamoto

2 March 2	FC Tokyo	1–1	Sanfrecce Hiroshima	Chofu
15:04 JST	Endo (yellow card) 19'; Araki 71'	Report	Ohashi 69'; Araki (yellow card) 87'	Stadium: Ajinomoto Stadium; Attendance: 32,274; Referee: Koichiro Fukushima

9 March 3	FC Tokyo	1–2	Vissel Kobe	Chofu
16:03 JST	Morishige (yellow card) 8'; Koizumi 50'; Henrique Trevisan (red card) 70'	Report	Miyashiro 57'; Osako 74'; Thuler (yellow card) 89'	Stadium: Ajinomoto Stadium; Attendance: 24,974; Referee: Hayato Shimizu

16 March 4	Avispa Fukuoka	1–3	FC Tokyo	Fukuoka
13:03 JST	Mae (yellow card) 14'; Shigemi (yellow card) 64'; Matsuoka 82'; Maejima (yellow card) 90'	Report	Nagatomo 28'; Araki 32'; Koizumi (yellow card) 45+1'; Bangnagande 57'; Anzai (yellow card) 90+3'	Stadium: Best Denki Stadium; Attendance: 8,043; Referee: Yoshimi Yamashita

30 March 5	Kawasaki Frontale	3–0	FC Tokyo	Kawasaki
15:03 JST	Wakizaka 34'; Yamada 83'; Tachibanada 90+2'	Report	Kimoto (yellow card) 26'; Hatano (red card) 72'	Stadium: Uvance Todoroki Stadium by Fujitsu; Attendance: 22,543; Referee: Masuya Ueda

3 April 6	FC Tokyo	2–1	Urawa Red Diamonds	Shinjuku
19:33 JST	Araki 50'; Matsuki 58'; Doi (yellow card) 89'	Report	Thiago Santana 24'; Gustafson 85'	Stadium: Japan National Stadium; Attendance: 49,005; Referee: Akihiko Ikeuchi

7 April 7	FC Tokyo	2–0	Kashima Antlers	Shinjuku
17:04 JST	Koizumi (yellow card) 39'; Nakagawa 55'; Shirai (yellow card) 66'; Harakawa 90+7'	Report		Stadium: Japan National Stadium; Attendance: 52,773; Referee: Hayato Shimizu

13 April 8	Tokyo Verdy	2–2	FC Tokyo	Chofu
16:03 JST	Miki 28' (pen.); Someno 33'; Yamakoshi (yellow card) 82'	Report	Anzai (yellow card) 26' (yellow-red card) 43'; Endo 68', 90+4'	Stadium: Ajinomoto Stadium; Attendance: 31,746; Referee: Koei Koya

21 April 9	FC Tokyo	2–2	Machida Zelvia	Chofu
15:00 JST	Ogashiwa 21' (pen.)	Report	Na Sang-ho 14'; Fujimoto (yellow card) 22'; Oh Se-hun 25'	Stadium: Ajinomoto Stadium; Attendance: 30,811; Referee: Shu Kawamata

27 April 10	Albirex Niigata	1–3	FC Tokyo	Niigata
14:00 JST	Miyamoto (yellow card) 26'; Chiba (yellow card) 35'; Ota (yellow card) 82'; Hayakawa 90'	Report	Nakagawa 39'; Shirai 49'; Diego Oliveira 62'	Stadium: Denka Big Swan Stadium; Attendance: 24,438; Referee: Yudai Yamamoto

3 May 11	FC Tokyo	2–1	Kyoto Sanga	Chofu
15:00 JST	Bangnagande 4'; Koizumi (yellow card) 19'; Diego Oliveira 21'; Oka (yellow card) 90+9'	Report	Toyokawa (yellow card) 9'; Sato (yellow card) 56'; Hirato (yellow card) 63'; Hiraga 79'	Stadium: Ajinomoto Stadium; Attendance: 26,770; Referee: Takuto Okabe

6 May 12	Hokkaido Consadole Sapporo	1–2	FC Tokyo	Sapporo
14:00 JST	Baba 5'; Takao (yellow card) 90+7'; Kobayashi (yellow card) 90+8'	Report	Tawaratsumida 27'; Koizumi (yellow card) 47'; Diego Oliveira 65'; Jája Silva (yellow card) 86'; Ko (yellow card) 90+8'	Stadium: Sapporo Dome; Attendance: 17,187; Referee: Hiroki Kasahara

11 May 13	FC Tokyo	3–3	Kashiwa Reysol	Chofu
17:00 JST	Nakagawa 6'; Diego Oliveira 32' (pen.); Matsuki 37'; Hatano (red card) 45+2'	Report	Matheus Sávio 2' (yellow card) 62'; Diego (yellow card) 30'; Sekine (yellow card) 45+1'; Inukai 46'; Shimamura 58'	Stadium: Ajinomoto Stadium; Attendance: 22,325; Referee: Futoshi Nakamura

15 May 14	Nagoya Grampus	3–1	FC Tokyo	Toyota
19:00 JST	Uchida (yellow card) 14'; Yoshida (yellow card) 17'; Nagai (yellow card) 28'; Junker 33' (pen.), 66', 71'	Report	Bangnagande (yellow card) 23'; Araki 78'; Kimoto (yellow card) 81'	Stadium: Toyota Stadium; Attendance: 14,553; Referee: Jumpei Iida

19 May 15	FC Tokyo	1–1	Yokohama F. Marinos	Chofu
15:00 JST	Bangnagande (yellow card) 18'; Nagatomo (yellow card) 49' (goal) 55'; Henrique Trevisan (yellow card) 90+3'	Report	Kida (yellow card) 13'; Nam Tae-hee 25'; Élber (yellow card) 59'; Uenaka (yellow card) 89'	Stadium: Ajinomoto Stadium; Attendance: 30,411; Referee: Sascha Stegemann (Germany)

26 May 16	FC Tokyo	0–1	Gamba Osaka	Chofu
15:00 JST	Bangnagande (yellow card) 59'; Koizumi (yellow card) 66'; Henrique Trevisan (yellow card) 90+3'	Report	Kurokawa (yellow card) 14'; Yamada 85'	Stadium: Ajinomoto Stadium; Attendance: 27,972; Referee: Takafumi Mikuriya

31 May 17	Sagan Tosu	0–1	FC Tokyo	Tosu
19:00 JST	Naganuma (yellow card) 35'; Yamazaki (yellow card) 59'	Report	Kimoto 11'; Matsuki (yellow card) 44'	Stadium: Ekimae Real Estate Stadium; Attendance: 7,528; Referee: Hayato Shimizu

16 June 18	FC Tokyo	1–1	Júbilo Iwata	Chofu
18:00 JST	Henrique Trevisan (yellow card) 13'; Morishige (yellow card) 74'; Anzai 84'	Report	Ricardo Graça 21'; Matsubara (yellow card) 88'	Stadium: Ajinomoto Stadium; Attendance: 24,580; Referee: Yudai Yamamoto

22 June 19	Shonan Bellmare	0–1	FC Tokyo	Hiratsuka
19:00 JST		Report	Tokumoto 79'; Harakawa (yellow card) 90+6'	Stadium: Lemon Gas Stadium Hiratsuka; Attendance: 11,533; Referee: Hiroyuki Kimura

26 June 20	FC Tokyo	1–0	Hokkaido Consadole Sapporo	Chofu
19:00 JST	Anzai 84'; Diego Oliveira (yellow card) 90'	Report	K. Tanaka (yellow card) 37'; Okamura (yellow card) 58'; Nishino (yellow card) 76'; Baba (yellow card) 90+2'	Stadium: Ajinomoto Stadium; Attendance: 15,828; Referee: Yoshiro Imamura

30 June 21	FC Tokyo	0–1	Avispa Fukuoka	Chofu
18:30 JST		Report	Douglas Grolli (yellow card) 33'; Kamekawa (yellow card) 53'; Shigemi 66'; Zahedi (yellow card) 90+1'	Stadium: Ajinomoto Stadium; Attendance: 20,133; Referee: Darren England (England)

6 July 22	Kashiwa Reysol	3–2	FC Tokyo	Kashiwa
19:00 JST	Diego 14'; Takamine 32'; Shimamura (yellow card) 84'; Toshima 90+4'	Report	Diego Oliveira 2'; Oka 86'	Stadium: Sankyo Frontier Kashiwa Stadium; Attendance: 11,804; Referee: Hayato Shimizu

13 July 23	FC Tokyo	2–0	Albirex Niigata	Shinjuku
19:00 JST	Endo 6'; Kimoto (yellow card) 42'; L. Nozawa 78'	Report	Endo (yellow card) 24'; Horigome (yellow card) 36'	Stadium: Japan National Stadium; Attendance: 57,885; Referee: Atsushi Kamimura

20 July 24	Kashima Antlers	2–1	FC Tokyo	Kashima
18:00 JST	Nago 30'; Nono 47'; Chinen (yellow card) 72'	Report	Anzai (yellow card) 37'; Endo 41'; Oka (yellow card) 78'; Nakagawa (yellow card) 85'	Stadium: Kashima Soccer Stadium; Attendance: 24,304; Referee: Yudai Yamamoto

7 August 25	Gamba Osaka	0–0	FC Tokyo	Suita
19:00 JST	Yamashita (yellow card) 55'	Report	Nakamura (yellow card) 5'; Nagatomo (yellow card) 20'; Nakagawa (yellow card) 53'	Stadium: Panasonic Stadium Suita; Attendance: 19,298; Referee: Yoshiro Imamura

11 August 26	FC Tokyo	0–3	Kawasaki Frontale	Chofu
19:00 JST	Diego Oliveira (yellow card) 36'	Report	Yamada 15', 20'; Takai 72'	Stadium: Ajinomoto Stadium; Attendance: 37,452; Referee: Yuichi Nishimura

17 August 27	FC Tokyo	0–0	Tokyo Verdy	Chofu
19:00 JST		Report		Stadium: Ajinomoto Stadium; Attendance: 39,921; Referee: Futoshi Nakamura

24 August 28	Kyoto Sanga	3–0	FC Tokyo	Kameoka
19:00 JST	Rafael Elias 3'; Hara 36'; Hirato 50'	Report		Stadium: Sanga Stadium by Kyocera; Attendance: 13,193; Referee: Atsushi Kamimura

31 August 29	Sanfrecce Hiroshima	3–2	FC Tokyo	Hiroshima
18:30 JST	Arslan 5', 32', 63'	Report	Ogashiwa 79'; Nakano 90+1' (o.g.)	Stadium: Edion Peace Wing Hiroshima; Attendance: 24,451; Referee: Yusuke Araki

14 September 30	FC Tokyo	4–1	Nagoya Grampus	Shinjuku
19:00 JST	Higashi 13'; Diego Oliveira 31' (pen.); Ko 65'; Nakagawa 81'	Report	Inagaki 85'	Stadium: Japan National Stadium; Attendance: 55,896; Referee: César Arturo Ramos (Mexico)

21 September 31	Urawa Red Diamonds	0–2	FC Tokyo	Saitama
19:00 JST		Report	Inoue 9' (o.g.); Araki 17'	Stadium: Saitama Stadium 2002; Attendance: 41,379; Referee: Ryo Tanimoto

28 September 32	Yokohama F. Marinos	1–3	FC Tokyo	Yokohama
17:00 JST	Anderson Lopes 5'	Report	Oka 19'; Tawaratsumida 60'; Nakagawa 89'	Stadium: Nissan Stadium; Attendance: 28,601; Referee: Shu Kawamata

5 October 33	FC Tokyo	1–1	Sagan Tosu	Chofu
15:00 JST	Ko 82'	Report	Slivka 73'	Stadium: Ajinomoto Stadium; Attendance: 21,140; Referee: Yudai Yamamoto

19 October 34	Vissel Kobe	0–2	FC Tokyo	Kobe
19:00 JST		Report	Endo 24'; Anzai 54'	Stadium: Noevir Stadium Kobe; Attendance: 15,153; Referee: Futoshi Nakamura

3 November 35	FC Tokyo	0–2	Shonan Bellmare	Chofu
14:00 JST		Report	Suzuki 43'; Hata 49'	Stadium: Ajinomoto Stadium; Attendance: 28,337; Referee: Masuya Ueda

9 November 36	Machida Zelvia	3–0	FC Tokyo	Shinjuku
14:00 JST	Shirasaki 15'; Oh Se-hun 49'; Soma 79'	Report		Stadium: Japan National Stadium; Attendance: 45,288; Referee: Yuichi Nishimura

30 November 37	Júbilo Iwata	v	FC Tokyo	Iwata
--:-- JST		Report		Stadium: Yamaha Stadium

8 December 38	FC Tokyo	v	Cerezo Osaka	Chofu
--:-- JST		Report		Stadium: Ajinomoto Stadium

=== Emperor's Cup ===
As FC Tokyo is a J1 club, it started the competition on the second round.

12 June Second round	FC Tokyo	3–0	Veertien Mie	Chofu
19:00	Higashi 21'; Morishige 37'; Harakawa 42'	Report		Stadium: Ajinomoto Stadium; Attendance: 4,040; Referee: Koki Nagamine

10 July Third round	FC Tokyo	1–2 (a.e.t.)	JEF United Chiba	Chiba
19:00	Nakamura (yellow card) 31'; Higashi (yellow card) 41'; Matsuki 49' (yellow card) 112'	Report	Kobayashi (yellow card) 18'; Matsuda (yellow card) 57'; Hayashi 79'; Goya 91'; Takahashi (yellow card) 96'	Stadium: Fukuda Denshi Arena; Attendance: 7,442; Referee: Masuya Ueda

=== J.League Cup ===
The club started the competition at the first round, being assigned to play its first match in the Round 2 of the Group 9. A win in its final sets the winner to qualify for the playoff round.

==== J.League Cup first round ====
17 April Round 2, Group 9	YSCC Yokohama	0–4	FC Tokyo	Yokohama
19:00	Fujita (yellow card) 33'; Okumura (yellow card) 88'; Yamamoto (yellow card) 90+5'	Report	Ogashiwa 13'; Harakawa 39'; Terayama (yellow card) 44'; Endo 61'; Jajá 90+3'	Stadium: NHK Spring Mitsuzawa Football Stadium; Attendance: 4,083; Referee: Takafumi Mikuriya

22 May Round 3, Group 9	Sagan Tosu	1–1 (a.e.t.) (4–5 p)	FC Tokyo	Tosu
19:00	Marcelo Ryan 90+1'	Report	Morishige 56'	Stadium: Ekimae Real Estate Stadium; Attendance: 2,862; Referee: Keigo Sendachi
	Penalties
	Marcelo Ryan (penalty scored); Tezuka (penalty scored); Yamazaki (penalty scored); Yokoyama (penalty scored); Naganuma (penalty missed)		(penalty scored) Morishige; (penalty scored) Araki; (penalty scored) Endo; (penalty scored) Tokumoto; (penalty scored) Koizumi

==== J.League Cup playoff round ====
5 June	FC Tokyo	1–2	Sanfrecce Hiroshima	Chofu
19:03	Diego Oliveira 25' (pen.) (yellow card) 63'; Tokumoto (yellow card) 55'	Report	Kato 10'; Matsumoto (yellow card) 6' (goal) 11'; Kawanami (yellow card) 24'; Araki (yellow card) 71'; Douglas Vieira (yellow card) 81'	Stadium: Ajinomoto Stadium; Attendance: 7,265; Referee: Hiroki Kasahara

9 June	Sanfrecce Hiroshima	3–1	FC Tokyo	Hiroshima
18:03	Sasaki (yellow card) 28'; Sotiriou (yellow card) 50'; Kato 53', 68'; Ohashi 55'	Report	Otani 77'; L. Nozawa (yellow card) 89'	Stadium: Edion Peace Wing Hiroshima; Attendance: 17,924; Referee: Jumpei Iida

== Goalscorers ==
As of 10 November 2024.

Rank	Pos.	No.	Player	J1 League	Emperor's Cup	J.League Cup	Total
1	FW	9	(Brazil) Diego Oliveira	6	0	1	7
1	MF	71	(Japan) Ryotaro Araki	7	0	0	7
3	MF	22	(Japan) Keita Endo	5	0	1	6
4	FW	39	(Japan) Teruhito Nakagawa	5	0	0	5
5	MF	7	(Japan) Kuryu Matsuki	2	1	0	3
5	FW	11	(Japan) Tsuyoshi Ogashiwa	2	0	1	3
5	FW	38	(Japan) Soma Anzai	3	0	0	3
8	DF	3	(Japan) Masato Morishige	0	1	1	2
8	DF	5	(Japan) Yuto Nagatomo	2	0	0	2
8	MF	8	(Japan) Takahiro Ko	2	0	0	2
8	MF	10	(Japan) Keigo Higashi	1	1	0	2
8	FW	28	(Japan) Leon Nozawa	1	0	1	2
8	DF	30	(Japan) Teppei Oka	2	0	0	2
8	FW	33	(Japan) Kota Tawaratsumida	2	0	0	2
8	MF	40	(Japan) Riki Harakawa	1	0	1	2
8	DF	49	(Japan) Kashif Bangnagande	2	0	0	2
17	DF	4	(Japan) Yasuki Kimoto	1	0	0	1
17	MF	37	(Japan) Kei Koizumi	1	0	0	1
17	DF	43	(Japan) Shuhei Tokumoto	1	0	0	1
17	MF	44	(Japan) Riki Harakawa	0	1	0	1
17	FW	55	(Japan) Divine Chinedu Otani	0	0	1	1
17	MF	70	(Brazil) Jája Silva	0	0	1	1
17	DF	99	(Japan) Kosuke Shirai	1	0	0	1
