= Jidayi =

Jidayi is a surname. Notable people with the surname include:

- Christian Jidayi (1987–2026), Italian footballer
- William Jidayi (born 1984), Italian footballer
