= Terayama =

Terayama (written: 寺山 lit. "temple mountain") is a Japanese surname. Notable people with the surname include:

- Shūji Terayama (寺山 修司; 1935–1983), Japanese poet, dramatist, writer, film director and photographer;
- Tsubasa Terayama (寺山 翼; born 2000), Japanese footballer.
