= Aoto Osako =

Japanese footballer

Personal information
- Date of birth: 23 May 2003 (age 23)
- Height: 1.73 m (5 ft 8 in)
- Position: Defender

Team information
- Current team: FC Tokyo

Youth career
- –: FC Tokyo

Senior career*
| Years | Team | Apps | (Gls) |
| 2019 | FC Tokyo U-23 | 2 | (0) |

International career^{‡}
| 2018 | Japan U15 | | |
| 2019 | Japan U16 | | |
| 2019 | Japan U17 | | |
| 2021– | Japan U18 | | |
- * Club domestic league appearances and goals as of 17:04, 28 March 2021 (UTC) ‡ National team caps and goals as of 17:04, 28 March 2021 (UTC)

Aoto Osako (大迫 蒼人, Osako Aoto; born 23 May 2003) is a Japanese footballer currently playing as a defender for FC Tokyo.

== International career ==
In March 2021, Osako was called up to the Japan under-18 squad for the first time.

== Career statistics ==
=== Club ===
As of 27 March 2021.

| Club | Season | League | | | National Cup | | League Cup | | Other | | Total | |
| Club | Season | Division | Apps | Goals | Apps | Goals | Apps | Goals | Apps | Goals | Apps | Goals |
|---|---|---|---|---|---|---|---|---|---|---|---|---|
| FC Tokyo U-23 | 2019 | J3 League | 2 | 0 | – | | – | | 0 | 0 | 2 | 0 |
| Career total | | | 2 | 0 | 0 | 0 | 0 | 0 | 0 | 0 | 2 | 0 |
