= Tokumoto =

Tokumoto (written: 徳元) is a Japanese surname. Notable people with the surname include:

- Shuhei Tokumoto (born 1995), Japanese footballer
- Yukito Tokumoto (born 1976), Japanese volleyball player
