= Okaniwa =

Okaniwa (written: 岡庭) is a Japanese surname. Notable people with the surname include:

- Shuto Okaniwa (岡庭 愁人, born 1999), Japanese footballer
- Yuki Okaniwa (岡庭 裕貴, born 1995), Japanese footballer
