= Stefano Mondini =

Italian footballer (born 1987)

Personal information
- Date of birth: 11 January 1987 (age 39)
- Place of birth: Monza, Italy
- Height: 1.78 m (5 ft 10 in)
- Position: Midfielder

Youth career
- A.C. Milan

Senior career*
Years	Team	Apps	(Gls)
2006–2008	Mantova	7	(0)
2007	→ Pistoiese (loan)	14	(1)
2008	→ Sangiovannese (loan)	12	(0)
2008–2009	Cesena	0	(0)
2009–2010	Mantova	6	(0)
2010–2011	Mezzocorona	19	(0)

International career
2005	Italy U18	1	(0)
- * Club domestic league appearances and goals

Stefano Mondini (born 11 January 1987) is an Italian footballer.

== Biography ==
In June 2008, Mondini was sold to A.C. Cesena for €1.5 million in two-year contract, but only in terms of player exchange (Christian Jidayi). In June 2009 both players returned to their mother clubs for the same price. However Mantova bankrupted at the end of season, as Mondini along would cost thousand of euro as amortization.
