= Valerio Di Cesare =

Italian footballer

Personal information
- Date of birth: 23 May 1983 (age 43)
- Place of birth: Rome, Italy
- Height: 1.87 m (6 ft 2 in)
- Position: Centre-back

Youth career
- ?–2001: Lazio
- 2001–2003: Chelsea

Senior career*
Years	Team	Apps	(Gls)
2003–2004	Chelsea	0	(0)
2004	→ Avellino (loan)	11	(0)
2004–2005	AlbinoLeffe	16	(0)
2005–2006	Catanzaro	5	(0)
2006–2008	Mantova	49	(2)
2008–2010	Vicenza	46	(2)
2010–2013	Torino	59	(1)
2013–2015	Brescia	62	(7)
2015–2017	Bari	47	(1)
2017–2018	Parma	32	(2)
2018–2024	Bari	168	(18)
- * Club domestic league appearances and goals

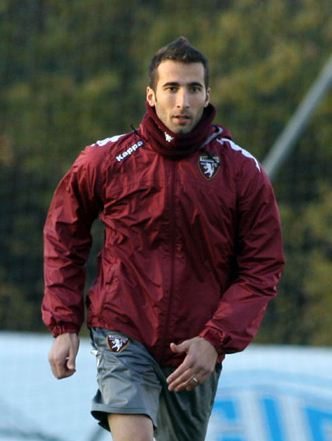
Valerio Di Cesare

Valerio Di Cesare (born 23 May 1983) is an Italian retired footballer who played as a centre-back.

== Career ==
Di Cesare career began with Lazio's youth system. During the summer of 2001, he accepted an offer from Chelsea, initially joining the Blues' reserve team. However, he failed to break into the first team, and left England in January 2004 without making a single appearance, joining Avellino in a temporary deal. Di Cesare suffered a serious knee injury. Before moving to Avellino, he also went to Brentford and Como for a trial.

Di Cesare then went on to play in Serie B with AlbinoLeffe, Catanzaro and Mantova, joining the Virgiliani in January 2006.

=== Mantova ===
Di Cesare only played twice for the Veneto side in 2005–06 Serie B. In the next two seasons, he played 46 times out of a possible 84 Serie B games.

=== Vicenza ===
In June 2008, Di Cesare moved to Vicenza along with Simone Calori for €1 million and €500,000 respectively. However, concurrently, Mantova had to sign Mattia Marchesetti and Riccardo Fissore also for €1 million and €500,000, thus making the deal a pure player swap without involvement of cash. All four players signed a three-year contract. Di Cesare only briefly played again in the first season with his new club (13 times in Serie B); Di Cesare played 33 games in 2009–10 Serie B.

=== Torino ===
In the final year of his contract, Vicenza decided to sell him to Torino for €250,000 in a three-year contract (€750,000 short with the original price or €83,333 with the residual value of the contract), while Calori (who never played for the club) was released for free with a write-down of €166,667. Di Cesare made 50 out of possible 84 Serie B appearances with the Toro, winning the promotion back to Serie A. Di Cesare played nine times in 2012–13 Serie A. In June 2013, Di Cesare also obtained a license as youth team coach.

=== Brescia ===
On 8 August 2013, Di Cesare joined Serie B team Brescia. In 2015–16 Serie B, he did not receive a shirt number on 5 August. A week later he was sold to Bari.

=== Bari ===
Di Cesare signed a two-year contract with Bari on 12 August 2015.

=== Parma ===
On 31 January 2017, Di Cesare was signed by Parma in a 2 1/2-year contract.

=== Return to Bari ===
In September 2018, after being released by Parma, Di Cesare agreed to re-join Bari, following the club's refoundation in the Serie D league. He captained Bari to two promotions, leading the club back to Serie B and narrowly missing promotion to Serie A after losing to Cagliari in the 2022–23 Serie B playoff finals. He retired in June 2024 at the age of 41, after being instrumental in Bari's escape from relegation in a playoff match against Ternana, scoring the first goal in a 3–0 away win against the rossoverdi.

== Honours ==
Bari

- Serie C: 2021–22 (Group C)
