= Mantova 1911 =

Italian football club

Mantova
- Full name: Mantova 1911 S.r.l.
- Nicknames: I Virgiliani (The Virgilians); I Biancorossi (The White and Reds); I Biancobandati (The White-Banded)
- Founded: 1911; 115 years ago, as Associazione Mantovana del Calcio; 1994; 32 years ago, as Mantova Calcio; 2010; 16 years ago, as Mantova Football Club; 2017; 9 years ago, as Mantova 1911
- Stadium: Stadio Danilo Martelli – Pata Stadium
- Capacity: 14,884
- Owner: FP73 S.r.l.
- President: Filippo Piccoli
- Head coach: Francesco Modesto
- League: Serie B
- 2025–26: Serie B, 9th of 20
- Website: mantova1911.club
Home colours	Away colours

Mantova 1911, commonly referred to as Mantova, is an Italian professional football club based in Mantua (Italian: Mantova), Lombardy. Mantova had played consecutively in Serie A from the 1961–62 season to 1964–65, and from the 1966–67 season to 1967–68 as Associazione Calcio Mantova, when the team was called "Little Brazil", as its playing style recalled Brazilian football.

Since 2010, the club went bankrupt twice and continuously played between Serie D, Lega Pro Seconda Divisione, and the new Serie C under the name Mantova F.C. and, since 2017, Mantova 1911. After another relegation to Serie D in 2023, the club was readmitted to the third division, winning it immediately and returning to Serie B in 2024 after 14 years.

== History ==
Mantova was founded in 1911. They played in Serie A for seven seasons: 1961–62, 1962–63, 1963–64, 1964–65, 1966–67, 1967–68, and 1971–72, being nicknamed in its initial period as "Little Brazil" ("Piccolo Brasile"). The green and yellow shirt actually remembered that period, by far the best one in the team history. Mantova has also played eight seasons in Serie B, winning the title 1970–71.

Mantova was cancelled from the Italian football panorama in 1994 due to insolvency.

Former famous players for the club include Dino Zoff, Angelo Sormani, Anton Alleman and Karl-Heinz Schnellinger.

Mantova was promoted from Serie C2 to Serie B in two consecutive seasons, in 2003–04 as league champions, and in 2004–05 as runners-up and playoff winners. Mantova begun the 2005–06 Serie B campaign introducing itself as a strong potential candidate for promotion to Serie A, despite its lack of players experienced with these levels (almost the same squad which promoted to Serie B the previous season) and a coach, Domenico Di Carlo, on just his second year as first team football trainer. The team led the Serie B table for a long part of the season, gaining an unexpected interest by the media. However, Mantova was not able to maintain the head of the league in the end, and the team concluded its season in fourth place, gaining a spot in the promotion playoffs. Successively, AC Mantova won its playoff semifinal against Modena after two ties (0–0, 1–1), qualifying because of its top placement in the regular season. The first playoff final, against Torino, saw Mantova winning at home 4–2. However, Mantova was not able to maintain this advantage in the return match, lost 3–1 in Turin after extra time, which allowed Torino to be promoted in Serie A because of a superior placement in the regular season.

During the 2006–07 season, Mantova became the first club to beat Juventus in a Serie B match. They ended the season in eighth place, confirming themselves in the top side of the league table. Following Di Carlo's resignations, Mantova appointed Attilio Tesser as new head coach for their 2007–08 Serie B campaign. As part of an ambitious summer transfer market, on 23 August 2007 Mantova signed former Italian international Stefano Fiore. However, the club's campaign proved to be disappointing as the team failed to break into the promotion playoff zone, resulting in the sacking of Tesser in the mid-season. He was replaced by Giuseppe Brucato, a young manager with no previous experience in the league, who guided the club to a mid-table finish in the season.

Brucato was confirmed as head coach of Mantova for the 2008–09 season. As Fiore parted company with the club following an unimpressive season with the virgiliani, he was replaced by Tomas Locatelli. However, Mantova failed to assure themselves a place in the higher ranks of the league, causing the sacking of Brucato following a 1–3 home defeat to Parma. The club successively appointed former Milan defender Alessandro Costacurta as its new head coach. Costacurta later resigned and was replaced by Mario Somma, who led the club to a final 13th place, only two points ahead the relegation play-off zone.

For the 2009–10 season, Mantova was guided by former Italian international Michele Serena. The financial situation of the club was deteriorated, which the club raised the short term profit by player exchange, but also raised the long term amortisation cost. The club had swapped Stefano Mondini with Christian Jidayi on 30 June 2008 in co-ownership deal for €750,000, made the clubs had player selling revenue of €1.5 million. June 2009 also saw Jidayi return to Cesena and Mondini back to Mantova; 50% of both players' rights were valued at €750,000. However, it became a financial burden for both clubs, which Mantova had to amortise Mondini's value (€1.5 million) in instalments as amortisation. In June 2008 Mantova also swapped Valerio Di Cesare (€1M) and Simone Calori (€0.5M) with Riccardo Fissore (€0.5M) and Mattia Marchesetti (€1M). Again, Mantova had to amortise €0.5M in for 3 seasons for Fissore (€166,667) and Marchesetti (€333,333).

At the beginning of 2010–11 season, Mantova went bankrupt and a new entity was admitted to Serie D. Mantova came first in Girone B and gained promotion to 2011–12 Lega Pro Seconda Divisione. They finished 16th and only escaped relegation after beating both Lecco and Vibonese in the playoffs. The first leg against Vibonese was a 0–0 stalemate away, leading to fears the club would not survive the second leg. However, Mantova went on to record a famous 4–0 victory. The home leg was viewed by over 3,000 spectators and Mantova enjoyed some of the strongest support of the 40 sides in Lega Pro Seconda Divisione. Throughout the 2011–12 season, Mantova sacked three managers and three sporting directors.

In the 2012–13 Lega Pro Seconda Divisione, Mantova had a solid season, finishing in ninth place, nine points short of a promotion playoff place and 11 points above a relegation playoff place. In the off season, 70% of Mantova is sold to former Sambonifacese president Michele Lodi, who became the president of Mantova.

The Lega Pro Seconda Divisione underwent a reformatting. The first eight teams in each girone, plus one team winning the relegation playoff round from each division will remain in Lega Pro. The last six teams in each girone, plus three relegation play-out losers from each division will be relegated to Serie D. In all, eighteen teams will remain in Lega Pro, and eighteen teams will be relegated to Serie D.

In the 2013–14 Lega Pro Seconda Divisione, Mantova finished eighth, which guaranteed them a spot in next season's 2014–15 Lega Pro Divisione Unica, the new Serie C. The team was part of the "Group A". Mantova remained in the third tier until 2017. At the start of season, the club did not join the 2017–18 Serie C, a successor club, Mantova 1911 S.S.D., was admitted to 2017–18 Serie D instead.

In 2018 it was taken over by Maurizio Setti, the holder of Hellas Verona, who invested in the club to be promoted to Serie C. Mantova lost the championship to Como despite reaching 83 points and was promoted the following year, despite the championship not being completed because of the COVID-19 outbreaks in Italy. In the 2020–21 Serie C Mantova placed 10th in their group, and placed 15th in the following season. The third Serie C season under Setti's ownership ended with a relegation to Serie D after losing the relegation play-offs to AlbinoLeffe.

In the summer 2023, Filippo Piccoli became the owner of the club, which managed to be readmitted to Serie C after Pordenone's exclusion. After a dominant league campaign, culminated in a 5–0 away win against the closest rivals Padova, Mantova clinched promotion and returned to Serie B after 14 years.

== Recent seasons ==
Season	Division	Tier	Pos	Pl	W	D	L	+	-	P	Cup	Note
as Mantova F.C.
2016–17	Lega Pro (Group B)	III	↓ 15	38	10	11	17	37	50	41	–	Excluded and dissolved post-season. Mantova 1911, a phoenix club, was admitted to Serie D
as Mantova 1911
2017–18	Serie D (Group C)	IV	4	34	17	9	8	56	34	60	–	Eliminated in the promotion play-offs semifinals to Arzignano
2018–19	Serie D (Group B)	IV	2	34	26	5	3	73	27	83	–	Lost the promotion play-offs finals to Pro Sesto
2019–20	Serie D (Group D)	IV	↑ 1	24	14	9	1	59	31	51	2nd round	Promoted to Serie C
2020–21	Serie C (Group B)	III	10	38	12	13	13	47	49	49	–	Eliminated in the promotion play-offs 1/32 finals to Cesena
2021–22	Serie C (Group A)	III	15	38	9	15	14	37	42	42	–	
2022–23	Serie C (Group A)	III	16	38	12	9	17	48	62	45	–	Lost the relegation play-outs to AlbinoLeffe. However due to Pordenone's exclusion, was readmitted to Serie C
2023–24	Serie C (Group A)	III	↑ 1	38	24	8	6	72	31	80	–	Promoted to Serie B
2024–25	Serie B	II	13	38	10	14	14	49	58	44	1st round	
2025–26	Serie B	II	9	38	13	7	18	45	57	46	1st round	

== Colours and badge ==
=== Colours ===
Mantova played in a sky blue shirt with white shorts and sky blue socks until 1956, when OZO company became the club's main sponsor. Colours were changed from sky blue and white to white and red, the colours of the company, in an unusual scheme for Italian football: white with a red sash. Mantova debuted in Serie A with this kit.

In the late 1960s, when the club had poor results, a red shirt with white shorts and red socks was adopted as the home kit. The OZO Mantova kit was reintroduced by the owner Fabrizio Lori in the 2000s, and since then became the home kit.

In the last years the away kit has usually retained the home kit scheme, inverting the colours: a white sash on a red base.

Sky blue has been used mainly for third kits. During the 2010-11 campaign, a special sky blue shirt with a white and red sash was released to celebrate the club's 100th anniversary and was used as the first choice kit for the final part of the season.

During the Serie B years between 2005 and 2008 Mantova used a yellow kit with a green sash to remember the "Piccolo Brasile", the team who achieved three promotions in four years between the end of the 1950s and the start of the 1960s.

=== Badge ===
Mantova crest has always been characterized by two elements: the town's coat of arms and a light blue semicircle to remember the original colours of the team, combined in a round shape. The round element has been inserted in a red and white shield, with an upper white stripe in which the name of the club is written.

== Current squad ==
As of 5 September 2026

Note: Flags indicate national team as defined under FIFA eligibility rules; some limited exceptions apply. Players may hold more than one non-FIFA nationality.

No.	Pos.	Nation	Player
1	GK	ITA	Luca Gemello
5	DF	MNE	Bodin Tomašević (on loan from Bologna)
6	MF	BEL	Jean-Pierre Longonda (on loan from Koper)
7	FW	ITA	Matteo Spinaccè (on loan from Inter)
8	MF	ROU	Rareș Ilie
9	FW	ITA	Ettore Gliozzi
10	MF	ITA	David Wieser
11	MF	CAN	Ismael Cajazzo
12	GK	ITA	Manuel Gasparini
13	DF	ITA	Andrea Meroni
17	DF	ITA	Nicolò Radaelli
18	MF	FRA	Sambaly Keïta
19	FW	ITA	Francesco Ruocco
20	MF	ITA	Flavio Paoletti
21	MF	ITA	Simone Trimboli (captain)

No.	Pos.	Nation	Player
22	GK	ITA	Francesco Bardi
25	MF	ITA	Lorenzo Ignacchiti
27	DF	ITA	Alessio Castellini
29	DF	ITA	Stefano Cella
30	FW	ITA	Davide Bragantini
33	DF	ITA	Cristian Marai
41	MF	BRA	Jonathan Silva (on loan from Torino)
44	MF	ITA	Yassin Banna
50	DF	ALG	Fahem Benaïssa-Yahia
58	FW	ITA	Tommaso Del Lungo
71	FW	ITA	Federico Chinetti (on loan from Como)
75	DF	BIH	Eman Košpo (on loan from Fiorentina)
77	MF	ITA	Filippo Vesentini
80	MF	BFA	Rachid Kouda (on loan from Parma)
99	FW	SRB	Vanja Vlahović (on loan from Atalanta)

=== Out on loan ===
Note: Flags indicate national team as defined under FIFA eligibility rules; some limited exceptions apply. Players may hold more than one non-FIFA nationality.

No.	Pos.	Nation	Player
—	FW	ITA	Antonio Fiori (at Cesena until 30 June 2027)

== Technical staff ==
Position	Name
Head coach	(Italy) Francesco Modesto
Assistant coach	(Italy) Alessandro Gamberini
Fitness coach	(Italy) Luca Picasso
Goalkeeper coach	(Italy) Demetrio Greco
Technical coach	(Italy) Jacopo Zennaro
Match analyst	(Italy) Marco Liberalon
Medical area coordinator and doctor	(Italy) Marco Walter Cassago
Recovery manager	(Italy) Franco Chinnici
Physiotherapist	(Italy) Christian Bodini (Italy) Antonio Bottardi (Italy) Simone Broglia (Italy) Marco Fontanesi
Psychologist	(Italy) Fabio Pansera
Bus Driver	(Italy) Stefano Di Giustino
Kitman	(Italy) Marco Ferretti (Italy) Dante Marsiletti (Italy) Mauro Oro

== Notable former players ==
The popular italian goalkeeper Dino Zoff played for Mantova from 1963 to 1967; Karl-Heinz Schnellinger was also part of the team during their golden era.

== Notable former coaches ==
- Ottavio Bianchi
- Roberto Boninsegna
- Mario Corso
- Alessandro Costacurta
- Edmondo Fabbri
- Nándor Hidegkuti

== Honours ==
- Serie B Championship: 1
- Serie C Championship: 1
- Serie C2 Championships: 3

== Divisional movements ==
Series	Years	Last	Promotions	Relegations
A	7	1971–72		▼5 (1923, 1926, 1965, 1968, 1972)
B	16	2025–26	▲4 (1924, 1961, 1966, 1971)	▼4 (1928, 1948, 1973, 2010✟)
C +C2	43 +17	2023–24	▲4 (1946, 1959, 2005, 2024) ▲5 (1986 C2, 1988 C2, 1993 C2, 2004 C2, 2014 C2)	▼4 (1982 C1, 1987 C1, 1991 C1, 1994✟) ▼2 (1954, 2017✟)
83 out of 94 years of professional football in Italy since 1929
Founding member of the Football League’s First Division in 1921
D	10	2019–20	▲4 (1958, 1997, 2011, 2020)	never
E	1	1994–95	▲1 (1995)	never
