= Mattia Marchesetti =

Italian footballer (born 1983)

Personal information
- Date of birth: 28 September 1983 (age 43)
- Place of birth: Crema, Italy
- Height: 1.79 m (5 ft 10 in)
- Position: Midfielder

Youth career
- Cremonese

Senior career*
Years	Team	Apps	(Gls)
2001–2006	Cremonese	95	(21)
2004–2005	→ Chievo (loan)	10	(1)
2006	→ Sampdoria (loan)	8	(0)
2006–2007	Chievo	5	(0)
2007	→ Triestina (loan)	20	(3)
2007–2008	Vicenza	12	(0)
2008–2010	Mantova	35	(1)
2010–2011	Alessandria	11	(1)
2011–2012	Pizzighettone	36	(6)
2012	St.Angelo Lodigiano	14	(5)
2012–2013	Olginatese	18	(5)
2013–2014	Gozzano	22	(1)
- * Club domestic league appearances and goals

Mattia Marchesetti (born 28 September 1983) is an Italian footballer.

== Biography ==
Born in Crema, Lombardy, Marchesetti started his career at provincial capital – Cremona for Cremonese. In July 2004 he was signed by Serie A club Chievo in temporary deal. However, he only made his top division debut on 9 January 2005. Marchesetti returned to Cremona for 2005–06 Serie B. In January 2006 Marchesetti was signed by Sampdoria. In July 2006 he was re-signed by Chievo. However Marchesetti only played 5 times in Serie A and 4 times in 2006–07 Coppa Italia. In January 2007 Marchesetti left for Triestina.

In August 2007 Marchesetti was signed by Vicenza in co-ownership deal for €250,000 in 4-year contract. However, he failed to play regularly either in 2007–08 Serie B. In January 2008 Vicenza signed him outright for another €150,000, as part of Luca Rigoni's deal.

On 25 June 2008, 5 days before the closure of 2007–08 financial year, Marchesetti and Riccardo Fissore were sold to Mantova for €1M and €500,000 respectively, which made Vicneza had a profit of €625,000 and €481,250 respectively in accounting. (Note: €1M minus contract residual value €375,000 (75% of €500,000) and €500,000 minus residual value of €18,750.) However, the payment was only via the transfer of registration rights of Valerio Di Cesare (€1M) and Simone Calori (€500,000). All 4 players signed 3-year contract. The deals made both clubs had benefit on the field as well as in accounting. (Note: Aforementioned player profit of about €1M for Vicneza and undisclosed profit for Mantova in 2007–08 financial year, but amortization cost of player contract increased from around €125,000 (Marchesetti; Fissore negligible) to €500,000, effectively allocate revenue in the future (2008–09 to 2010–11) to 2007–08 financial year. Moreover, Vicenza lose former U21 internationals Fissore and backup player Marchesetti for Di Cesare who was a regular for the team and Calori who never played for Vicenza; Vicneza released both player in 2010 but could not recovered their residual value at that time (€333,333 and €166,667), for €250,000 and zero respectively.)

Marchesetti played 35 times for Mantova in 2008–09 Serie B, however most of them as substitutes (11 starts). He never played for the Veneto club in 2009–10 Serie B despite under contract. He became free agent after the club bankrupted. Marchesetti joined Alessandria for 2010–11 Lega Pro Prima Divisione. After another disappointing season Marchesetti moved to non fully professional football in Serie D, for Pizzighettone, Sant'Angelo Lodigiano and Olginatese.
