= Julián Magallanes =

Argentine footballer

Personal information
- Full name: Julián David Magallanes
- Date of birth: 20 March 1986 (age 40)
- Place of birth: Arequito, Santa Fe, Argentina
- Height: 1.80 m (5 ft 11 in)
- Position: Midfielder

Senior career*
Years	Team	Apps	(Gls)
2006	Tiro Federal	1	(0)
2006–2007	Gimnasia y Tiro	11	(1)
2007–2009	Sangiustese	37	(5)
2009–2010	Vicenza	9	(0)
2009–2010	→ Taranto (loan)	3	(0)
2010	→ Cittadella (loan)	18	(0)
2010–2012	Cittadella	35	(0)
2012–2013	Cremonese	8	(0)
Total		122	(6)
- * Club domestic league appearances and goals

Julián David Magallanes (born 20 March 1986) is an Argentine former footballer who plays as a midfielder.

== Biography ==
Born in Arequito, Caseros, Santa Fe Province, Magallanes started his professional career at the province capital, for Tiro Federal. He made his Argentine Primera División debut on 29 April 2006, against Racing de Avellaneda. That match Tiro Federal lost to Racing 0–2 and Magallanes was substituted by Jorge Sebastián Sáez. The team relegated after the 2006 Clausura season. Magallanes then joined Torneo Argentino B (4th level) side Gimnasia y Tiro.

In summer 2007, he moved to Italian Serie D side Sangiustese due to lack of European Union citizenship. Magallanes won the league champion in Group F and followed the team promoted to Seconda Divisione. Magallanes also got professional status and eligible to sign by any Italian professional clubs without using the non-EU registration quota from abroad and from amateur (which Serie B and Lega Pro clubs had no quota). Magallanes played 17 matches in the 2nd division and was signed by Serie B side Vicenza in the mid-season for €110,000. He was awarded no.33 shirt, the same number at Tiro Federal. Magallanes made his Serie B debut on 13 February 2009, started the match against Bari. The match ended in 1–1 draw and Magallanes was replaced by Matteo Serafini in the 83rd minute. At the start of season, he was awarded no.20 shirt but on 5 August 209 loaned to Taranto along with Simone Calori. His shirt was taken by Gianluca Litteri.

At Taranto, he just played 3 Prima Divisione matches and on 1 February 2010 left for Serie B side Cittadella on loan with option to purchase, where he quickly entered the starting XI and played both legs of promotion playoffs first round/semi–final against Brescia. (Brescia 1–1 draw with Cittadella in aggregate and won due to higher league position, and eventually promoted after winning the final)

On 25 June 2010, Cittadella decided to sign him outright for €130,000. (but in terms of the registration rights of Diego Oliveira, valued for €130,000)

On 12 July 2012 he was signed by U.S. Cremonese.

== Honours ==
- Serie D: 2008
