= Leon Nozawa =

Japanese footballer

Leon Nozawa 野澤 零温
Personal information
- Date of birth: 21 July 2003 (age 23)
- Place of birth: Itabashi, Tokyo, Japan
- Height: 1.74 m (5 ft 9 in)
- Position: Forward

Team information
- Current team: Júbilo Iwata (on loan from FC Tokyo)
- Number: 28

Youth career
- 2012–2015: Amigo FC
- 2016–2021: FC Tokyo

Senior career*
| Years | Team | Apps | (Gls) |
| 2019 | FC Tokyo U-23 | 4 | (0) |
| 2021– | FC Tokyo | 52 | (3) |
| 2022 | → SC Sagamihara (loan) | 7 | (1) |
| 2023 | → Matsumoto Yamaga FC (loan) | 15 | (2) |
| 2026– | → Júbilo Iwata (loan) | 3 | (0) |

International career^{‡}
| 2018 | Japan U15 | | |
- * Club domestic league appearances and goals as of 13:34, 9 October 2026 (UTC) ‡ National team caps and goals as of 28 March 2021, 13:04 (UTC)

Leon Nozawa (野澤 零温, Nozawa Reon; born 21 July 2003) is a Japanese footballer who plays as a forward for J2 League club Júbilo Iwata, on loan from FC Tokyo.

== Club career ==
Nozawa was registered as a type-2 player for the 2021 season with FC Tokyo. On 20 September 2021, he was promoted to the first team from the 2022 season.

On 14 January 2022, Nozawa was loaned out to J3 club SC Sagamihara from the 2022 season.

On 14 August 2023, Nozawa was announced at Matsumoto Yamaga on a six month loan deal.

== Career statistics ==
=== Club ===
As of 9 October 2026.

Appearances and goals by club, season and competition
| Club | Season | League | | | National cup (Note: Includes Emperor's Cup) | | League cup (Note: Includes J.League Cup) | | Total | |
| Club | Season | Division | Apps | Goals | Apps | Goals | Apps | Goals | Apps | Goals |
|---|---|---|---|---|---|---|---|---|---|---|
| FC Tokyo U-23 | 2019 | J3 League | 4 | 0 | – | | – | | 4 | 0 |
| FC Tokyo | 2021 | – | | | 0 | 0 | 2 | 0 | 2 | 0 |
| FC Tokyo | 2023 | J1 League | 3 | 0 | 1 | 0 | 4 | 0 | 8 | 0 |
| FC Tokyo | 2024 | J1 League | 14 | 1 | 2 | 0 | 4 | 0 | 20 | 1 |
| FC Tokyo | 2025 | J1 League | 25 | 1 | 5 | 0 | 2 | 0 | 32 | 1 |
| FC Tokyo | 2026 | J1 (100) | 10 | 1 | – | | – | | 10 | 1 |
| FC Tokyo | Total | | 52 | 3 | 8 | 0 | 12 | 0 | 72 | 3 |
| SC Sagamihara (loan) | 2022 | J3 League | 7 | 1 | 0 | 0 | – | | 7 | 1 |
| Matsumoto Yamaga (loan) | 2023 | J3 League | 15 | 2 | – | | – | | 15 | 2 |
| Júbilo Iwata (loan) | 2026–27 | J2 League | 3 | 0 | 1 | 0 | 1 | 0 | 5 | 0 |
| Career total | | | 81 | 6 | 9 | 0 | 13 | 0 | 103 | 6 |
