= Kosei Numata =

Japanese footballer

Personal information
- Date of birth: 12 January 2002 (age 24)
- Place of birth: Tokyo, Japan
- Height: 1.77 m (5 ft 10 in)
- Position: Midfielder

Team information
- Current team: Azul Claro Numazu
- Number: 40

Youth career
- Kodaira FC Wings
- –2019: FC Tokyo

College career
Years	Team	Apps	(Gls)
2020–2023	Niigata University of Health and Welfare		

Senior career*
Years	Team	Apps	(Gls)
2019	FC Tokyo U-23	5	(0)
2024–	Azul Claro Numazu	54	(2)
- * Club domestic league appearances and goals as of 1 January 2026

Kosei Numata (沼田 航征, Numata Kosei; born 12 January 2002) is a Japanese footballer who plays for Azul Claro Numazu.

== Career statistics ==
=== Club ===
As of 12 November 2020.

Club	Season	League			Cup		Other		Total	
Club	Season	Division	Apps	Goals	Apps	Goals	Apps	Goals	Apps	Goals
FC Tokyo U-23	2019	J3 League	5	0	0	0	0	0	5	0
Career total			5	0	0	0	0	0	5	0
