= Kojiro Yasuda =

Japanese footballer

Kojiro Yasuda 安田 虎士朗
Personal information
- Full name: Kojiro Yasuda
- Date of birth: 14 August 2003 (age 23)
- Place of birth: Ishikawa, Japan
- Height: 1.73 m (5 ft 8 in)
- Position: Midfielder

Team information
- Current team: Ventforet Kofu (on loan from FC Tokyo)
- Number: 8

Youth career
- 2010–2012: Kanazawa Minami JSC
- 2012–2016: Futsu SSS
- 2016–2021: FC Tokyo

Senior career*
Years	Team	Apps	(Gls)
2019	FC Tokyo U-23	9	(0)
2021–	FC Tokyo	1	(0)
2023	→ Tochigi SC (loan)	13	(0)
2024–2025	→ Tegevajaro Miyazaki (loan)	60	(1)
2026–	→ Tegevajaro Miyazaki (loan)	21	(1)

International career^{‡}
2018	Japan U16		
2020	Japan U17		
- * Club domestic league appearances and goals as of 17 August 2026 ‡ National team caps and goals as of 17:04, 28 March 2021 (UTC)

Kojiro Yasuda (安田 虎士朗, Yasuda Kojiro; born 14 August 2003) is a Japanese professional footballer who plays as a midfielder for J2 League club Ventforet Kofu, on loan from FC Tokyo.

== Club career ==
Yasuda was registered as a type-2 player for the 2021 season with FC Tokyo.

In December 2022, it was announced that Yasuda would be joining J2 League club Tochigi SC on loan for the 2023 season.

In March 2024, Yasuda joined J3 League club Tegevajaro Miyazaki on loan until 31 January 2025.

== International career ==
Yasuda has represented Japan at under-16 and under-17 level.

== Career statistics ==
=== Club ===
As of end of the 2023 season.

Appearances and goals by club, season and competition
Club	Season	League			National Cup		League Cup		Other		Total	
Club	Season	Division	Apps	Goals	Apps	Goals	Apps	Goals	Apps	Goals	Apps	Goals
Japan			League		Emperor's Cup		J.League Cup		Other		Total	
FC Tokyo U-23	2019	J3 League	9	0	–		–		–		9	0
FC Tokyo	2021	J1 League	0	0	1	0	1	0	–		2	0
FC Tokyo	2022	J1 League	1	0	2	0	2	0	–		5	0
FC Tokyo	Total		1	0	3	0	3	0	0	0	7	0
Tochigi SC (loan)	2023	J2 League	13	0	2	0	–		–		15	0
Career total			23	0	5	0	3	0	0	0	31	0
