= Seiichiro Kubo =

Japanese footballer

Seiichiro Kubo 久保 征一郎
Personal information
- Full name: Seiichiro Kubo
- Date of birth: June 22, 2001 (age 25)
- Place of birth: Kagoshima, Japan
- Height: 1.85 m (6 ft 1 in)
- Position: Forward

Team information
- Current team: Renofa Yamaguchi FC
- Number: 22

Youth career
- –2016: Taiyo SC Kagoshima
- 2017–2019: FC Tokyo

College career
Years	Team	Apps	(Gls)
2020–2023	Hosei University		

Senior career*
Years	Team	Apps	(Gls)
2018–2019	FC Tokyo U-23	22	(2)
2023–2026	Mito HollyHock	49	(9)
2026	→ Fujieda MYFC (loan)	5	(0)
2026–	Renofa Yamaguchi FC	1	(0)
- * Club domestic league appearances and goals as of 21 August 2026

Seiichiro Kubo (久保 征一郎, Kubo Seiichirō; born June 22, 2001) is a Japanese football player for Renofa Yamaguchi FC.

== Playing career ==
Kubo was born in Kagoshima Prefecture on June 22, 2001. He joined J1 League club FC Tokyo from youth team in 2018.
