= Simone Calori =

Italian footballer and coach

Personal information
- Date of birth: 23 July 1980 (age 46)
- Place of birth: Montevarchi, Italy
- Height: 1.84 m (6 ft 1/2 in)
- Position: Defender

Senior career*
Years	Team	Apps	(Gls)
1998–1999	Colligiana	3	(0)
1999–2000	Cagliari	0	(0)
2000–2006	Sangiovannese	130	(2)
2006–2007	Pisa	31	(0)
2007–2008	Mantova	18	(0)
2008–2010	Vicenza	0	(0)
2009	→ Perugia (loan)	12	(0)
2009–2010	→ Taranto (loan)	27	(0)
2010–2011	Pisa	23	(0)
2011–2012	Salerno	31	(0)
2012–2013	Giacomense	10	(0)
2013–2014	Matera	14	(1)
2014–2015	Rimini	27	(0)
2015–2016	Group Castello	26	(0)
2016–2017	Poggibonsi	22	(0)
2017–2019	Sangiovannese	39	(0)

Managerial career
- 2019–2020: Sangiovannese
- * Club domestic league appearances and goals

Simone Calori (born 23 July 1980) is an Italian football coach and a former player who played as a defender.

== Playing career ==
Born in Montevarchi, the province of Arezzo, Tuscany, Calori started his career at Serie D club Colligiana. In 1999, he was signed by Cagliari. From 2000 to 2006, Calori spent 6 seasons with Sangiovannese, a team also located in the province of Arezzo. In 2006, he moved to Pisa, Tuscany. Calori played 31 matches in 2006–07 Serie C1. Calori also played all 4 matches in the promotion playoffs, winning promotion back to Serie B.

In July 2007, Calori moved to fellow Serie B club Mantova. He only played 18 games in 2007–08 Serie B, including 7 starts. On 25 June 2008, 5 days before the closure of 2007–08 financial year, Calori and Valerio Di Cesare were swapped with Mattia Marchesetti and Riccardo Fissore. Calori also re-joined former Pisa team-mate Giovanni Passiglia at Vicenza. Both Mantova and Vicenza valued the players for €1.5 million, also signing 3-year contract. Di Cesare was valued €1,000,000, Calori for €500,000; Marchesetti €1,000,000 and Fissore €500,000.

Calori failed to make his league debut for Vicenza. In January 2009 Calori left for Perugia of Lega Pro Prima Divisione in temporary deal. In the next season Calori left for another third division club Taranto along with Julián Magallanes.

In summer 2010, Vicenza sold Calori to Pisa for free (along with Passiglia) and Di Cesare to Torino for just €250,000. The club had to write-down the residual value of the contracts partially or in full. (Note: Calori: €500,000 over 3 (year of contract) times 1 (remaining year of contract) = €166,667; Di Cesare: €1,000,000 over 3 minus €250,000 (revenue) = €83,333)

Calori was signed by Serie D club Salerno in summer 2011. The club finished as the Group G winner and directly promoted back to the fourth division – the lowest level of the professional league.

In December 2012 he was signed by Giacomense.

== Coaching career ==
On 28 April 2019, Serie D club Sangiovannese that he was playing for at the time, announced that he has been appointed the head coach of the team. He was sacked on 21 January 2020 after six defeats in a row.
