= Shuto Nagano =

Japanese footballer (born 2006)

Personal information
- Date of birth: April 15, 2006 (age 20)
- Place of birth: Nerima, Tokyo, Japan
- Height: 1.82 m (6 ft 0 in)
- Positions: Centre-back; defensive midfielder

Team information
- Current team: FC Tokyo
- Number: 20

Youth career
- 2019–2021: FC Tokyo U-15 Fukagawa
- 2022–2024: FC Tokyo U-18

Senior career*
Years	Team	Apps	(Gls)
2024–	FC Tokyo	0	(0)
2025	→ Gainare Tottori (loan)	31	(1)
2026	→ Fujieda MYFC (loan)	17	(0)

International career^{‡}
2023	Japan U17	8	(1)
2026–	Japan U23	10	(2)
Medal record
Men's football
Representing Japan
AFC U-23 Asian Cup
Gold medal – first place	2026 Saudi Arabia
AFC U-17 Asian Cup
Gold medal – first place	2023 Thailand
Asian Games
Silver medal – second place	2026 Aichi–Nagoya
- * Club domestic league appearances and goals as of 30 May 2026 ‡ National team caps and goals as of 3 October 2026

Shuto Nagano (永野 修都, Nagano Shūto; born April 15, 2006) is a Japanese professional footballer who plays as a centre-back or defensive midfielder for FC Tokyo.

== Club career ==
Nagano was registered with the FC Tokyo U-18 team in May 2024. On June 12, he made his debut as a substitute second round of the Emperor's Cup against Veertien Mie. In July, he was offered a promotion to the first team starting in 2025.

In January 2025, Nagano was loaned to Gainare Tottori on a developmental basis, in which he was appointed vice-captain, even though he was a first-year professional. In 2026, he was loaned to Fujieda MYFC on a developmental basis.

On June 27, 2026, FC Tokyo announced that Nagano would return to the team.

== International career ==
Nagano was selected for Japan for the 2023 AFC U-17 Asian Cup in Thailand. His team defeated South Korea 3–0 in the final, which allowed Japan to lift their fourth continental title. Nagano was again selected for Japan for the 2023 FIFA U-17 World Cup later in the year.

Nagano was part of the Japan U23 squad that won the 2026 AFC U-23 Asian Cup. He was also part of the Japan U23 squad that won the silver medal at the 2026 Asian Games.

== Career statistics ==
Appearances and goals by club, season and competition
Club	Season	League			Cup		League Cup		Continental		Total	
Club	Season	Division	Apps	Goals	Apps	Goals	Apps	Goals	Apps	Goals	Apps	Goals
FC Tokyo	2024	J1 League	0	0	1	0	0	0	—		1	0
FC Tokyo	2026–27	J1 League	0	0	2	0	0	0	—		2	0
FC Tokyo	Total		0	0	3	0	0	0	—		3	0
Gainare Tottori (loan)	2025	J3 League	31	1	1	0	1	0	—		33	1
Fujieda MYFC (loan)	2026	J2/J3 (100)	17	0	—		—		—		17	0
Career total			48	1	4	0	1	0	0	0	53	1

== Honours ==
Japan U17

- AFC U-17 Asian Cup: 2023

Japan U23

- AFC U-23 Asian Cup: 2026
- Asian Games silver medal: 2026
