= Riccardo Fissore =

Italian footballer (born 1980)

Personal information
- Date of birth: 18 February 1980 (age 46)
- Place of birth: Carmagnola, Italy
- Height: 1.85 m (6 ft 1 in)
- Position: Defender

Youth career
- Torino

Senior career*
Years	Team	Apps	(Gls)
1999–2000	Torino	0	(0)
1999–2000	→ Juve Stabia (loan)	27	(1)
2000–2001	Internazionale	0	(0)
2000–2001	→ Lecce (loan)	2	(0)
2001–2003	Torino	0	(0)
2001–2003	→ Vicenza (loan)	32	(1)
2003–2008	Vicenza	133	(4)
2008	→ Atalanta (loan)	2	(0)
2008–2010	Mantova	49	(1)
2010–2011	Spezia	21	(0)
2011–2012	Pavia	30	(0)
2014	Real Vicenza	9	(0)
2014–2015	Pordenone	26	(2)
2015–2016	Maceratese	19	(0)
2016–2017	Fondi	14	(1)
2017	Pistoiese	10	(0)
2017–	Delta PT	12	(0)

International career
1998–1999	Italy U19	8	(0)
1999–2001	Italy U20	14	(0)
2000	Italy U21	1	(0)
- * Club domestic league appearances and goals as of 4 January 2018

Riccardo Fissore (born 18 February 1980) is an Italian former footballer who last played for A.C. Delta Calcio Rovigo as a defender.

== Club career ==
=== Early career ===
Born in Carmagnola, Piedmont, Fissore started his career with Torino. In June 2000, Fissore was exchanged to Internazionale along with his teammate Franco Semioli for 500 million lire and 5.5 billion lire respectively (approx. €3.10 million in total) in co-ownership deals. As part of the deal, Fabio Galante went in the opposite direction and joined Torino for 5.1 billion lire (approx. €2.63 million). After a loan spell at US Lecce, Fissore returned to Internazionale in January 2001. In June 2001 Torino bought back Fissore for 2 billion lire (approx. €1.03 million).

=== Vicenza ===
Fissore then moved to Serie B side Vicenza, initially on loan, but the deal was later turned into a co-ownership deal in 2003, and in summer 2004 Vicenza bought all of the player's remaining registration rights from Torino by winning the blind auction bid. In January 2008, Fissore left for Atalanta on loan, in exchange with Antonino Bernardini.

=== Mantova ===
In June 2008 Fissore (for €500,000) and Mattia Marchesetti (for €1 million) were exchanged with Mantova for Valerio Di Cesare (for €1 million) and Simone Calori (for €500,000). The 4 players signed a 3-year contract.

=== Lega Pro clubs ===
In summer 2010 Mantova went bankrupt. In August 2010 Fissore joined Spezia. On 31 August 2011 Fissore left for Pavia.

=== Italian football scandal ===
On 18 June 2012 Fissore was banned 3 years and 9 months due to involvement in 2011–12 Italian football scandal. In April 2013 the ban was reduced to 14 months after the appeal was partially accepted by Tribunale Nazionale di Arbitrato per lo Sport (TNAS) of CONI.

=== Return to Lega Pro ===
On 1 February 2014 Fissore joined Real Vicenza. The club also signed Mirko Stefani, who return to football also from ban.

On 21 July 2014 Fissore was signed by Pordenone in a one-year deal.

On 2 September 2015 Fissore was signed by Maceratese.

In October 2016 he was hired by Fondi. In January 2017 he moved to Pistoiese.

== International career ==
Fissore reached the final of the 1999 UEFA European Under-18 Championship with the Italy national under-19 football team, losing out to Portugal.
