= Soma Anzai =

Japanese footballer (born 2002)

Soma Anzai 安斎 颯馬
Personal information
- Date of birth: 29 September 2002 (age 24)
- Place of birth: Tokyo, Japan
- Height: 1.75 m (5 ft 9 in)
- Positions: Defender; winger

Team information
- Current team: FC Tokyo
- Number: 7

Youth career
- FC Tokyo

College career
Years	Team	Apps	(Gls)
2021–2023	Waseda University		

Senior career*
Years	Team	Apps	(Gls)
2023–	FC Tokyo	73	(10)
2026	→ Penafiel (loan)	14	(1)
- * Club domestic league appearances and goals as of 14 October 2026

Soma Anzai (安斎 颯馬, Anzai Soma; born 29 September 2002) is a Japanese professional footballer who plays as a defender or winger for J1 League club FC Tokyo.

== Early life ==
Anzai was born on 29 September 2002. Born in Tokyo, Japan, he is a native of the city.

Growing up, he attended Aomori Yamada High School in Japan, where he played alongside Japan international Kuryu Matsuki while playing for the school's football team. Following his stint there, he attended Waseda University in Japan, where he played on the college's football team.

== Career ==
As a youth player, Anzai joined the youth academy of FC Tokyo, where he wore the number ten jersey while playing for the club's under-15 team and was promoted to their senior team in 2023. On 16 June 2024, he scored his first goal for the Gasmen during a 1–1 home draw with Júbilo Iwata in the league.

In 2026, he was sent on loan to Portuguese side Penafiel, where he made fourteen league appearances and scored one goal. On 6 February 2026, he debuted and scored his first goal for the club during a 1–0 away win over Chaves in the league.

== Career statistics ==
As of 24 October 2026.

Appearances and goals by club, season and competition
Club	Season	League			National cup (Note: Includes Emperor's Cup)		League cup (Note: Includes J.League Cup)		Total	
Club	Season	Division	Apps	Goals	Apps	Goals	Apps	Goals	Apps	Goals
FC Tokyo	2023	J1 League	2	0	0	0	2	0	4	0
FC Tokyo	2024	J1 League	31	4	1	0	4	0	36	4
FC Tokyo	2025	J1 League	30	2	3	0	3	1	36	3
FC Tokyo	2026–27	J1 League	10	4	2	3	2	0	14	7
FC Tokyo	Total		73	10	6	3	11	1	90	14
FC Penafiel (loan)	2025–26	Liga Portugal 2	14	1	–		–		14	1
Career total			87	11	6	3	11	1	104	15
