= Kōta Tawaratsumida =

Japanese footballer

Kōta Tawaratsumida 俵積田 晃太
Personal information
- Date of birth: 14 May 2004 (age 22)
- Place of birth: Kanagawa Prefecture, Japan
- Height: 1.75 m (5 ft 9 in)
- Position: Midfielder

Team information
- Current team: FC Tokyo
- Number: 33

Youth career
- –2016: Arte Hachioji FC
- 2017–2022: FC Tokyo

Senior career*
Years	Team	Apps	(Gls)
2023–	FC Tokyo	103	(7)

International career^{‡}
2025–	Japan	3	(0)
- * Club domestic league appearances and goals as of 21:09, 4 October 2026 (UTC) ‡ National team caps and goals as of 12 July 2025

Kōta Tawaratsumida (俵積田 晃太, Tawaratsumida Kōta; born 14 May 2004) is a Japanese footballer who plays as a midfielder for J1 League club FC Tokyo and the Japan national team.

== Youth career ==
Tawaratsumida started playing football at five years old influenced by his older brother. At elementary school, he played for ARTE Hachioji FC Junior and later moved on to FC Tokyo U-15s as a junior. For FC Tokyo U-15s, he helped them finish third in the U-15 Japan Club Youth Cup.

He moved up to the U-18s in 2020 and was part of the team that were beaten finalists in the U-18 Japan Club Youth Championship, losing 3–2 to Sagan Tosu U-18s, although Tawaratsumida himself only made a series of late cameos throughout the competition.

In the 2021 and 2022 seasons, he had more play time consistency in the Prince Takamado U-18 Football League, playing 27 times and scoring three goals.

== Club career ==
In February 2022, it was announced Tawaratsumida would be joining up with FC Tokyo's first team squad as a Type 2 registered player, meaning he could continue to represent their U-18s as well as being registered with the first team. In August 2022, it was decided that he would fully join the top team for the 2023 season.

At the start of the 2023 season, Tawaratsumida was identified as a player that could have a breakout rookie season. On 23 February 2023, he made his debut in a J1 League match against Kashiwa Reysol where he appeared as an 80th-minute substitute for Koki Tsukagawa. In matchweek 4 of the 2023 season, Tawaratsumida was named in the starting XI for the first time in a 3–1 win over Yokohama FC and made an impact with his ability to dribble into the opponent's box. His dribbling ability was on display in October, when Tawaratsumida won the J1 League Goal of the Month award for his solo effort in a 3–0 win over Gamba Osaka. At the end of his debut season, Tawaratsumida played 35 games for FC Tokyo in all competitions, scoring two goals.

In the 2024 season, Tawaratsumida won the Young Player of the Month award for May after contributing a goal and an assist.

In October 2026, aged 22, Tawaratsumida made his 100th J1 League appearance.

== Career statistics ==
=== Club ===
As of 4 October 2026.

Appearances and goals by club, season and competition
Club	Season	League			National cup (Note: Includes Emperor's Cup)		League cup (Note: Includes J.League Cup)		Total	
Club	Season	Division	Apps	Goals	Apps	Goals	Apps	Goals	Apps	Goals
FC Tokyo	2023	J1 League	27	2	3	0	5	0	35	2
FC Tokyo	2024	J1 League	33	2	2	0	3	0	38	2
FC Tokyo	2025	J1 League	34	2	3	0	2	0	39	2
FC Tokyo	2026	J1 (100)	4	0	–		–		4	0
FC Tokyo	2026–27	J1 League	5	1	1	0	1	0	7	1
FC Tokyo	Total		103	7	9	0	11	0	123	7
Career total			103	7	9	0	11	0	123	7

== Honours ==
Japan

- EAFF Championship: 2025
