= Tsubasa Terayama =

Japanese footballer

Tsubasa Terayama 寺山 翼
Personal information
- Date of birth: 10 April 2000 (age 26)
- Place of birth: Saitama, Japan
- Height: 1.80 m (5 ft 11 in)
- Position: Attacking midfielder

Team information
- Current team: Montedio Yamagata
- Number: 17

Youth career
- 2007–2013: Niiza Katayama FC SS
- 2013–2018: FC Tokyo

College career
Years	Team	Apps	(Gls)
2019–2023	Juntendo University		

Senior career*
Years	Team	Apps	(Gls)
2017–2018	FC Tokyo U-23	15	(0)
2021–2026	FC Tokyo	12	(0)
2024	→ Sagan Tosu (loan)	7	(1)
2025–2026	→ Montedio Yamagata (loan)	35	(5)
2026–	Montedio Yamagata	1	(0)
- * Club domestic league appearances and goals as of 13 August 2026

Tsubasa Terayama (寺山 翼, Terayama Tsubasa; born April 10, 2000) is a Japanese football player who plays as an attacking midfielder for J2 League club Montedio Yamagata.

== Career statistics ==
=== Club ===
As of 10 April 2026.

Appearances and goals by club, season and competition
Club	Season	League			National cup (Note: Includes Emperors Cup)		League cup (Note: Includes J.League Cup)		Total	
Club	Season	Division	Apps	Goals	Apps	Goals	Apps	Goals	Apps	Goals
FC Tokyo U-23 (loan)	2017	J3 League	4	0	–		–		4	0
FC Tokyo U-23 (loan)	2018	J3 League	11	0	–		–		11	0
FC Tokyo U-23 (loan)	Total		15	0	0	0	0	0	15	0
FC Tokyo	2021	J1 League	1	0	0	0	0	0	1	0
FC Tokyo	2023	J1 League	9	0	2	0	7	0	18	0
FC Tokyo	2024	J1 League	2	0	0	0	1	0	3	0
FC Tokyo	2025	J1 League	0	0	0	0	0	0	0	0
FC Tokyo	Total		12	0	2	0	8	0	22	0
Juntendo University	2021	–			3	1	–		3	1
Sagan Tosu (loan)	2024	J1 League	7	1	0	0	–		7	1
Montedio Yamagata (loan)	2025	J2 League	15	3	1	0	–		16	3
Montedio Yamagata (loan)	2026	J2/J3 (100)	9	2	0	0	–		9	2
Montedio Yamagata (loan)	Total		24	5	1	0	0	0	25	5
Career total			58	6	6	1	8	0	72	7
