= Renta Higashi =

Japanese footballer

Renta Higashi 東 廉太
Personal information
- Date of birth: 17 June 2004 (age 22)
- Place of birth: Yamaguchi, Japan
- Height: 1.89 m (6 ft 2 in)
- Position: Centre back

Team information
- Current team: Tochigi SC (on loan from FC Tokyo)
- Number: 3

Youth career
- Yanagito SSS
- 2017–2019: Takagawa Gakuen Junior High School
- 2020–2022: FC Tokyo

Senior career*
Years	Team	Apps	(Gls)
2022–	FC Tokyo	0	(0)
2023	→ SC Sagamihara (loan)	4	(0)
2025	→ Giravanz Kitakyushu (loan)	12	(0)
2026–	→ Tochigi SC (loan)	2	(0)

International career
2019	Japan U16		
- * Club domestic league appearances and goals as of 1 January 2026

Renta Higashi (東 廉太, Higashi Renta; born 17 June 2004) is a Japanese footballer currently playing as a centre back for J2 League club Tochigi SC, on loan from FC Tokyo.

== Club career ==
Born in Yamaguchi, Japan, Higashi played in his youth for Yanagito SSS, Takagawa Gakuen Junior High School, and FC Tokyo. He made his debut in a 0–0 J.League Cup draw with Júbilo Iwata on 15 March 2022, and was praised for helping to keep a clean sheet in his first professional game.

== Career statistics ==
=== Club ===
As of 9 October 2026.

Appearances and goals by club, season and competition
Club	Season	League			National cup (Note: Includes Emperor's Cup)		League cup (Note: Includes J.League Cup)		Total	
Club	Season	Division	Apps	Goals	Apps	Goals	Apps	Goals	Apps	Goals
FC Tokyo	2022	J1 League	0	0	0	0	4	0	4	0
FC Tokyo	2023	J1 League	0	0	1	0	0	0	1	0
FC Tokyo	2024	J1 League	0	0	0	0	0	0	0	0
FC Tokyo	2026	J1 (100)	0	0	–		–		0	0
FC Tokyo	Total		0	0	1	0	4	0	5	0
SC Sagamihara (loan)	2023	J3 League	4	0	–		–		4	0
Giravanz Kitakyushu (loan)	2025	J3 League	12	0	3	0	1	0	16	0
Tochigi SC (loan)	2026–27	J3 League	2	0	1	0	1	0	4	0
Career total			18	0	5	0	6	0	29	0
