= Kosuke Yamazaki =

Japanese footballer

Kosuke Yamazaki 山﨑 浩介
Personal information
- Full name: Kosuke Yamazaki
- Date of birth: December 30, 1995 (age 30)
- Place of birth: Saitama, Japan
- Height: 1.82 m (5 ft 11 1/2 in)
- Position: Defender

Team information
- Current team: Júbilo Iwata
- Number: 30

Youth career
- Omiya KS United 02
- –2013: Omiya Ardija

College career
Years	Team	Apps	(Gls)
2014–2017	Meiji University		

Senior career*
Years	Team	Apps	(Gls)
2018–2020	Ehime FC	90	(4)
2021–2022	Montedio Yamagata	74	(2)
2023–2024	Sagan Tosu	63	(1)
2025	Yokohama FC	21	(0)
2026–	Júbilo Iwata	15	(0)
- * Club domestic league appearances and goals as of 14 August 2026

Kosuke Yamazaki (山﨑 浩介, Yamazaki Kōsuke; born December 30, 1995) is a Japanese footballer who plays as a centre-back for J2 League club Júbilo Iwata.

== Playing career ==
Yamazaki was born in Saitama Prefecture on December 30, 1995. After graduating from Meiji University, he joined J2 League club Ehime FC in 2018.

== Career statistics ==
As of 1 April 2023.

Appearances and goals by club, season and competition
Club	Season	League			Cup		League Cup		Other		Total	
Club	Season	Division	Apps	Goals	Apps	Goals	Apps	Goals	Apps	Goals	Apps	Goals
Japan			League		Emperor's Cup		J. League Cup		Other		Total	
Ehime FC	2018	J2 League	25	1	1	0	-		-		26	1
Ehime FC	2019	J2 League	31	3	0	0	-		-		31	3
Ehime FC	2020	J2 League	34	0	0	0	-		-		34	0
Ehime FC	Total		90	4	1	0	0	0	0	0	91	4
Montedio Yamagata	2021	J2 League	33	0	0	0	-		-		33	0
Montedio Yamagata	2022	J2 League	41	2	0	0	-		2 (Note: Appearances in J1/J2 play-offs)	0	43	2
Montedio Yamagata	Total		74	2	0	0	0	0	2	0	76	2
Sagan Tosu	2023	J1 League	5	0	0	0	1	0	-		6	0
Career total			169	6	1	0	1	0	2	0	173	6
