= Shuhei Tokumoto =

Japanese footballer (born 1995)

Shuhei Tokumoto 徳元 悠平
Personal information
- Full name: Shuhei Tokumoto
- Date of birth: September 12, 1995 (age 31)
- Place of birth: Itoman, Okinawa, Japan
- Height: 1.70 m (5 ft 7 in)
- Position: Left back

Team information
- Current team: Nagoya Grampus
- Number: 55

Youth career
- 2002–2007: Miwa FC
- 2008–2010: Miwa Junior High School
- 2011–2013: Naha Nishi High School

College career
Years	Team	Apps	(Gls)
2014–2017	Josai International University		

Senior career*
Years	Team	Apps	(Gls)
2018–2019	FC Ryukyu	66	(2)
2020–2022	Fagiano Okayama	107	(3)
2023–2025	FC Tokyo	29	(2)
2024–2025	→ Nagoya Grampus (loan)	10	(0)
2025–	Nagoya Grampus	43	(2)
- * Club domestic league appearances and goals as of 12 August 2026

Shuhei Tokumoto (徳元 悠平, Tokumoto Shuhei; born September 12, 1995) is a Japanese footballer who plays as a left back for J1 League club Nagoya Grampus.

== Career ==
After attending Josai International University, Tokumoto signed for FC Ryukyu in January 2018. He scored his first league goal against Giravanz Kitakyushu on 17 March 2018, scoring in the 19th minute. During his first season at FC Ryukyu, he played in 31 J3 League games. At the end of the 2018 season, FC Ryukyu were promoted to the J2 League as champions. During the 2019 season, on 21 June 2019, FC Ryukyu announced that Tokumoto suffered a left ankle tibiofibular ligament injury and would be out for three weeks.

On 15 December 2019, Tokumoto was announced at Fagiano Okayama.

On 1 December 2022, Tokumoto was announced at FC Tokyo. During the 2023 season, he played in 18 league matches, and scored his first ever J1 goal. Tokumoto scored his first J1 goal against Kawasaki Frontale on 12 May 2023, scoring in the 12th minute. During the 2024 season, he played 11 league matches for FC Tokyo. Due to struggling for playing time with Kashif Bangnagande and Yūto Nagatomo also in the squad, he made a loan switch to Nagoya Grampus.

On 15 August 2024, Tokumoto was announced at Nagoya Grampus on a one-year loan. During his loan spell at Nagoya Grampus, the team changed tactics, with Tokumoto now playing at left-back, which meant Ryuji Izumi could play in a more attacking role. This helped Nagoya Grampus win the 2024 J.League Cup.

On 30 December 2024, Tokumoto made a permanent transfer to Nagoya Grampus after his loan expired.

== Club statistics ==
As of 27 February 2023.

Appearances and goals by club, season and competition
Club	Season	League			National Cup		League Cup		Other		Total	
Club	Season	Division	Apps	Goals	Apps	Goals	Apps	Goals	Apps	Goals	Apps	Goals
Japan			League		Emperor's Cup		J.League Cup		Other		Total	
FC Ryukyu	2018	J3 League	31	2	1	0	–		–		32	2
FC Ryukyu	2019	J2 League	35	0	0	0	–		–		35	0
FC Ryukyu	Total		66	2	1	0	0	0	0	0	67	2
Fagiano Okayama	2020	J2 League	36	2	0	0	–		–		36	2
Fagiano Okayama	2021	J2 League	39	0	2	0	–		–		41	0
Fagiano Okayama	2022	J2 League	32	1	0	0	–		–		32	1
Fagiano Okayama	Total		107	3	2	0	0	0	0	0	109	3
FC Tokyo	2023	J1 League	0	0	0	0	0	0	–		0	0
Career total			173	5	3	0	0	0	0	0	176	5

== Honours ==
Nagoya Grampus

- J.League Cup: 2024
