= Rio Omori =

Japanese footballer

Rio Omori 大森 理生
Personal information
- Date of birth: 21 July 2002 (age 24)
- Place of birth: Musashimurayama, Tokyo, Japan
- Height: 1.83 m (6 ft 0 in)
- Position: Centre back

Team information
- Current team: FC Tokyo
- Number: 15

Youth career
- –2021: FC Tokyo

Senior career*
Years	Team	Apps	(Gls)
2019	FC Tokyo U-23	21	(0)
2021–	FC Tokyo	4	(0)
2022	→ FC Ryukyu (loan)	22	(1)
2023	→ Omiya Ardija (loan)	9	(0)
2024	→ Iwaki FC (loan)	35	(2)
2025	→ FC Imabari (loan)	36	(1)

International career
2018	Japan U17		
2020	Japan U18		
- * Club domestic league appearances and goals as of 15:28, 9 April 2026 (UTC)

Rio Omori (大森 理生, Omori Rio; born 21 July 2002) is a Japanese professional footballer who play as a centre back and currently play for J1 League club FC Tokyo.

== Career ==
On 22 December 2023, Omori announce official loan transfer to Iwaki FC from 2024 season.

On 24 December 2024, Omori was loaned again to J2 promoted club, FC Imabari from 2025.

== Career statistics ==
=== Club ===
As of 9 April 2026.

Appearances and goals by club, season and competition
Club	Season	League			National cup (Note: Includes Emperors Cup)		League cup (Note: Includes J.League Cup)		Total	
Club	Season	Division	Apps	Goals	Apps	Goals	Apps	Goals	Apps	Goals
FC Tokyo U-23 (loan)	2019	J3 League	21	0	–		–		21	0
FC Tokyo	2020	J1 League	0	0	0	0	0	0	0	0
FC Tokyo	2021	J1 League	1	0	1	0	4	0	6	0
FC Tokyo	2026	J1 (100)	3	0	0	0	0	0	3	0
FC Tokyo	Total		4	0	1	0	4	0	9	0
FC Ryukyu (loan)	2022	J2 League	22	1	1	0	–		23	1
RB Omiya Ardija (loan)	2023	J2 League	9	0	2	0	–		11	0
Iwaki FC (loan)	2024	J2 League	35	2	2	0	2	0	39	2
FC Imabari (loan)	2025	J2 League	36	1	1	0	2	0	39	1
Career total			127	4	7	0	8	0	142	4
