= Tsuyoshi Kodama =

Japanese footballer

Tsuyoshi Kodama 児玉 剛
Personal information
- Full name: Tsuyoshi Kodama
- Date of birth: 28 December 1987 (age 38)
- Place of birth: Suita, Osaka, Japan
- Height: 1.83 m (6 ft 0 in)
- Position: Goalkeeper

Youth career
- 2006–2009: Kansai University

Senior career*
Years	Team	Apps	(Gls)
2010–2013	Kyoto Sanga FC	0	(0)
2014–2016	Ehime FC	123	(0)
2017–2018	Montedio Yamagata	56	(0)
2019–2024	FC Tokyo	9	(0)
2019	→ FC Tokyo U-23 (loan)	6	(0)
2025	Nagoya Grampus	0	(0)
Total		194	(0)
Medal record
Kyoto Sanga FC
Runner-up	Emperor's Cup	2011
- * Club domestic league appearances and goals

Tsuyoshi Kodama (児玉 剛, Kodama Tsuyoshi; born 28 December 1987) is a Japanese former footballer who played as a goalkeeper.

== Career ==
Kodama initially retired in January 2025, before coming out of retirement in February to sign for Nagoya Grampus.

== Club statistics ==
Appearances and goals by club, season and competition
Club	Season	League			National cup (Note: Includes Emperors Cup)		League cup (Note: Includes J.League Cup)		Other		Total	
Club	Season	Division	Apps	Goals	Apps	Goals	Apps	Goals	Apps	Goals	Apps	Goals
Kansai University	2009	–			2	0	–		–		2	0
Kyoto Sanga	2010	J.League Division 1	0	0	0	0	–		0	0	0	0
Kyoto Sanga	2011	J.League Division 2	0	0	0	0	–		0	0	0	0
Kyoto Sanga	2012	J.League Division 2	0	0	0	0	–		0	0	0	0
Kyoto Sanga	2013	J.League Division 2	0	0	1	0	–		0	0	1	0
Kyoto Sanga	Total		0	0	1	0	0	0	0	0	1	0
Ehime FC	2014	J.League Division 2	39	0	1	0	–		0	0	40	0
Ehime FC	2015	J2 League	42	0	1	0	–		1 (Note: Appearance in J1/J2 play-offs)	0	44	0
Ehime FC	2016	J2 League	42	0	2	0	–		0	0	44	0
Ehime FC	Total		123	0	4	0	0	0	1	0	128	0
Montedio Yamagata	2017	J2 League	38	0	1	0	–		–		39	0
Montedio Yamagata	2018	J2 League	18	0	5	0	–		–		23	0
Montedio Yamagata	Total		56	0	6	0	0	0	0	0	62	0
FC Tokyo	2019	J1 League	0	0	1	0	0	0	–		1	0
FC Tokyo	2020	J1 League	1	0	0	0	0	0	–		1	0
FC Tokyo	2021	J1 League	7	0	1	0	3	0	–		11	0
FC Tokyo	2022	J1 League	0	0	0	0	1	0	–		1	0
FC Tokyo	2023	J1 League	0	0	1	0	0	0	–		1	0
FC Tokyo	2024	J1 League	1	0	1	0	1	0	–		3	0
FC Tokyo	Total		9	0	4	0	5	0	0	0	18	0
FC Tokyo U-23 (loan)	2019	J3 League	6	0	–		–		–		6	0
Nagoya Grampus	2025	J1 League	0	0	0	0	0	0	–		0	0
Career total			194	0	17	0	5	0	1	0	217	0

== Honours ==
=== Club ===
FC Tokyo

- J.League Cup : 2020
