= Teruhito Nakagawa =

Japanese footballer

Teruhito Nakagawa 仲川 輝人
Personal information
- Full name: Teruhito Nakagawa
- Date of birth: 27 July 1992 (age 34)
- Place of birth: Kanagawa, Japan
- Height: 1.61 m (5 ft 3 1/2 in)
- Positions: Winger; forward

Team information
- Current team: FC Tokyo
- Number: 39

Youth career
- 2005–2010: Kawasaki Frontale

College career
Years	Team	Apps	(Gls)
2011–2014	Senshu University		

Senior career*
Years	Team	Apps	(Gls)
2015–2022	Yokohama F. Marinos	140	(35)
2016	→ Machida Zelvia (loan)	12	(3)
2017	→ Avispa Fukuoka (loan)	20	(0)
2023–	FC Tokyo	86	(12)

International career^{‡}
2019–	Japan	2	(0)
Medal record
Yokohama F. Marinos
Runner-up	J.League Cup	2018
Runner-up	Emperor's Cup	2017
Representing Japan
Men's football
EAFF Championship
Runner-up	2019 South Korea	Team
- * Club domestic league appearances and goals as of 16 September 2025 ‡ National team caps and goals as of 18 December 2019

Teruhito Nakagawa (仲川 輝人, Nakagawa Teruhito; born 27 July 1992) is a Japanese professional footballer who plays as a winger or a forward for J1 League club FC Tokyo.

== Club career ==
=== Early career ===
Born in Kanagawa, Nakagawa was educated at and played for Senshu University prior to joining Yokohama F. Marinos. In 2013, as the third-year student, he became the top scorer of the year with 15 goals in the JUFA-Kanto Division I League. And also selected as National team for Universiade Kazan, and was described as the best player in the League.

On 19 October 2014, he seriously injured his right knee, ACL, MCL and meniscus. Even though this injury forced him to end the season, it was not known when he would recover, but Marinos officially announced his joining on 28 October.

=== Yokohama F. Marinos ===
In August 2015, Nakagawa was fully recovered from his injury. On 6 September, he made his debut for Yokohama F. Marinos in Emperor's Cup against MIO Biwako Shiga. And 12 September, he made his debut in J1 League against Albirex Niigata.

On 25 May 2016, he scored his first goal in Marinos in J.League Cup against Albirex Niigata.

=== Machida Zelvia ===
On 6 September 2016, Nakagawa was loaned to Machida Zelvia. On 11 September, he made his debut in Zelvia. On 18 September, he scored his first goal in Zelvia in J2 League against Zweigen Kanazawa. During this season, he scored 3 goals in 12 games.

=== Yokohama F. Marinos ===
On 12 January 2017, Nakagawa returned to Yokohama F. Marinos.

=== Avispa Fukuoka ===
On 24 July 2017, Nakagawa was loaned to Avispa Fukuoka. During this season, he played in 18 games.

=== Yokohama F. Marinos ===
On 12 January 2018, Nakagawa returned to Yokohama F. Marinos again. On 19 May, he scored 2 goals in one game against V-Varen Nagasaki. On 29 September, he scored an excellent goal that was honored as the best goal of the month. He received the ball behind the halfway line, ran 40 meters and get the ball past the defender with a skillful nutmeg before scoring.

From 2019, he chose to use the number 23 at Yokohama F. Marinos. The Nissan brand uses the number 23 in its cars for motorsport competitions. The reason? In Japanese, "Ni" is number two and "San" is number three. and he got the nickname Nissan GT-R because of his speed.

On 3 May 2019, he scored first goal in Reiwa, the new era of Japan, against Sanfrecce Hiroshima. On 9 November, he scored incredible goal again in J1 League against Consadole Sapporo after he was chosen MVP for October 2019. He collected the ball near the center mark, dribbled 50 meters and past four defenders including goalkeeper before scoring, and the ball was gently passed to open goal.

=== FC Tokyo ===
In November 2022, it was announced that Nakagawa would be leaving Yokohama F. Marinos to join FC Tokyo.

== Personal life ==
In parents' home, Nakagawa has a poodle called Ray, and the origin of the dog's name is Teruhito, Nakagawa's first name. "Teru" of Teruhito is the Japanese word for "to shine" and has the same meaning as "Ray".

== Club statistics ==
As of start of the 2023 season

Appearances and goals by club, season and competition
Club	Season	League			National Cup		League Cup		Continental		Other		Total	
Club	Season	Division	Apps	Goals	Apps	Goals	Apps	Goals	Apps	Goals	Apps	Goals	Apps	Goals
Japan			League		Emperor's Cup		J. League Cup		AFC		Other		Total	
Yokohama F. Marinos	2015	J1 League	2	0	1	0	0	0	-		-		3	0
Yokohama F. Marinos	2016	J1 League	4	0	0	0	5	1	-		-		9	1
Yokohama F. Marinos	2017	J1 League	0	0	0	0	4	1	-		-		4	1
Yokohama F. Marinos	2018	J1 League	24	9	3	0	10	4	-		-		37	13
Yokohama F. Marinos	2019	J1 League	33	15	1	0	2	0	-		-		36	15
Yokohama F. Marinos	2020	J1 League	18	2	0	0	1	0	6	3	1 (Note: Appearance in the Japanese Super Cup)	0	26	5
Yokohama F. Marinos	2021	J1 League	28	2	0	0	5	4	-		-		33	6
Yokohama F. Marinos	2022	J1 League	31	7	1	0	0	0	6	0	-		38	7
Yokohama F. Marinos	Total		140	35	6	0	27	10	12	3	1	0	186	48
Machida Zelvia (loan)	2016	J2 League	12	3	0	0	-		-		-		12	3
Avispa Fukuoka (loan)	2017	J2 League	20	0	0	0	-		-		-		20	0
FC Tokyo	2023	J1 League	0	0	0	0	0	0	-		-		0	0
Career total			172	38	6	0	27	10	12	3	1	0	218	51

== National team statistics ==
Japan national team
Year	Apps	Goals
2019	2	0
Total	2	0

== Honours ==
=== Club ===
Yokohama F. Marinos

- J1 League: 2019, 2022

=== Individual ===
- J.League Most Valuable Player: 2019
- J.League Top Scorer: 2019
- J.League Best XI: 2019
