= William Jidayi =

Italian footballer

Personal information
- Date of birth: 9 August 1984 (age 42)
- Place of birth: Ravenna, Italy
- Height: 1.88 m (6 ft 2 in)
- Position: Midfielder

Youth career
- 1999–2000: Ravenna

Senior career*
Years	Team	Apps	(Gls)
2000–2005	Ravenna	30	(0)
2003–2004	→ Russi (loan)	34	(2)
2005	Melfi	7	(0)
2005–2006	San Pietro	33	(2)
2006–2008	Sassuolo	55	(2)
2009–2012	Padova	80	(5)
2012–2015	Juve Stabia	65	(4)
2014	→ Cittadella (loan)	13	(0)
2015–2017	Avellino	62	(3)
2017–2018	Pro Vercelli	7	(0)
2018–2021	Ravenna	74	(0)
- * Club domestic league appearances and goals

William Jidayi (born 9 August 1984) is an Italian former footballer who played as a midfielder.

== Personal life ==
Born in Italy, Jidayi is of Nigerian descent. William's brother Christian was also a professional footballer.

After retiring from his football career, Jidayi joined the municipal police force of the city of Cervia as a police officer.
