= Teppei Oka =

Japanese footballer

Teppei Oka 岡 哲平
Personal information
- Date of birth: 6 September 2001 (age 25)
- Place of birth: Tokyo, Japan
- Height: 1.85 m (6 ft 1 in)
- Position: Defender

Team information
- Current team: Avispa Fukuoka (on loan from FC Tokyo)
- Number: 16

Youth career
- –2019: FC Tokyo

College career
Years	Team	Apps	(Gls)
2020–2023	Meiji University		

Senior career*
Years	Team	Apps	(Gls)
2019–	FC Tokyo	40	(2)
2019	→ FC Tokyo U-23 (loan)	18	(0)
2026–	→ Avispa Fukuoka (loan)	20	(1)
- * Club domestic league appearances and goals as of 12 August 2026

Teppei Oka (岡 哲平, Oka Teppei; born 6 September 2001) is a Japanese footballer who plays as a defender for J1 League club Avispa Fukuoka, on loan from FC Tokyo.

== Career ==
Oka was born in Tokyo and was enrolled in FC Tokyo's academy. In 2019, he represented FC Tokyo U-23 in the J3 League, before continuing his development at Meiji University. In June 2023, it was announced that Oka would be joining FC Tokyo for the 2024 season.

== Career statistics ==
=== Club ===
As of 10 April 2026.

Appearances and goals by club, season and competition
Club	Season	League			National cup (Note: Includes Emperors Cup)		League cup (Note: Includes J.League Cup)		Total	
Club	Season	Division	Apps	Goals	Apps	Goals	Apps	Goals	Apps	Goals
FC Tokyo	2019	J1 League	0	0	0	0	0	0	0	0
FC Tokyo	2024	J1 League	19	2	2	0	3	0	24	2
FC Tokyo	2025	J1 League	21	0	3	0	3	0	27	0
FC Tokyo	Total		40	2	5	0	6	0	51	2
FC Tokyo U-23 (loan)	2019	J3 League	18	0	–		–		18	0
Avispa Fukuoka (loan)	2026	J1 (100)	9	1	–		–		9	1
Career total			67	3	5	0	6	0	78	3
