= Go Hatano =

Japanese footballer (born 1998)

Go Hatano 波多野 豪
Personal information
- Full name: Go Hatano
- Date of birth: May 25, 1998 (age 28)
- Place of birth: Musashimurayama, Tokyo, Japan
- Height: 1.98 m (6 ft 6 in)
- Position: Goalkeeper

Team information
- Current team: V-Varen Nagasaki
- Number: 13

Youth career
- Musashimurayama 1FC
- 2011–2016: FC Tokyo

Senior career*
Years	Team	Apps	(Gls)
2015–2025	FC Tokyo	60	(0)
2016–2019	→ FC Tokyo U-23 (loan)	51	(0)
2023	→ V-Varen Nagasaki (loan)	43	(0)
2026–	V-Varen Nagasaki	4	(0)
- * Club domestic league appearances and goals as of 11 August 2026

Go Hatano (波多野 豪, Hatano Gō; born May 25, 1998) is a Japanese professional footballer who plays as a goalkeeper for J1 League club V-Varen Nagasaki.

== Club career ==
Hatano joined FC Tokyo in 2016. On May 29, he debuted in the J3 League (v AC Nagano Parceiro).

In December 2022, it was announced that Hatano would be joining J2 League club V-Varen Nagasaki on loan for the 2023 season.

== National team career ==
In May 2017, Hatano was called up to the Japan U-20 national team for the 2017 U-20 World Cup. However, he did not play in any of the matches, as he was used as the reserve goalkeeper.

== Club statistics ==
As of 10 April 2026.

Appearances and goals by club, season and competition
Club	Season	League			National cup (Note: Includes Emperors Cup)		League cup (Note: Includes J.League Cup)		Continental		Total	
Club	Season	Division	Apps	Goals	Apps	Goals	Apps	Goals	Apps	Goals	Apps	Goals
FC Tokyo	2015	J1 League	0	0	0	0	0	0	0	0	0	0
FC Tokyo U-23 (loan)	2016	J3 League	2	0	–		–		–		2	0
FC Tokyo U-23 (loan)	2017	J3 League	15	0	–		–		–		15	0
FC Tokyo U-23 (loan)	2018	J3 League	11	0	–		–		–		11	0
FC Tokyo U-23 (loan)	2019	J3 League	23	0	–		–		–		23	0
FC Tokyo U-23 (loan)	Total		51	0	0	0	0	0	0	0	51	0
FC Tokyo	2017	J1 League	0	0	0	0	1	0	0	0	1	0
FC Tokyo	2018	J1 League	0	0	0	0	0	0	0	0	0	0
FC Tokyo	2019	J1 League	0	0	0	0	2	0	0	0	2	0
FC Tokyo	2020	J1 League	10	0	0	0	1	0	5 (Note: Appearances in AFC Champions League Elite)	0	16	0
FC Tokyo	2021	J1 League	31	0	0	0	8	0	0	0	39	0
FC Tokyo	2022	J1 League	1	0	2	0	4	0	0	0	7	0
FC Tokyo	2024	J1 League	13	0	1	0	2	0	0	0	16	0
FC Tokyo	2025	J1 League	7	0	1	0	2	0	0	0	10	0
FC Tokyo	Total		62	0	4	0	20	0	5	0	91	0
V-Varen Nagasaki (loan)	2023	J2 League	42	0	0	0	–		–		42	0
V-Varen Nagasaki	2026	J1 (100)	1	0	–		–		–		1	0
Career total			156	0	4	0	20	0	5	0	185	0

== Honours ==
=== Club ===
FC Tokyo

- J.League Cup : 2020
