= Henrique Trevisan =

Brazilian footballer (born 1997)

Personal information
- Full name: Henrique de Souza Trevisan
- Date of birth: January 20, 1997 (age 29)
- Place of birth: Umuarama, Brazil
- Height: 1.85 m (6 ft 1 in)
- Position: Centre-back

Team information
- Current team: Kyoto Sanga
- Number: 34

Youth career
- 2004–2010: Profesor Hamilton
- 2010–2012: Colégio Drummond
- 2012: Intercap
- 2012–2016: Figueirense

Senior career*
Years	Team	Apps	(Gls)
2016–2018	Figueirense	39	(3)
2019–2021	Estoril	0	(0)
2019–2020	→ Ponte Preta (loan)	35	(1)
2020–2021	→ Famalicão (loan)	4	(0)
2021	→ Oita Trinita (loan)	28	(2)
2022–2025	FC Tokyo	55	(3)
2026–	Kyoto Sanga	15	(2)
- * Club domestic league appearances and goals as of 1 August 2026

Henrique de Souza Trevisan (born 20 January 1997) is a Brazilian professional footballer who plays as a centre-back for J1 League club Kyoto Sanga.

== Club career ==
Trevisan joined the youth academy of Figueirense in 2012. Trevisan made his professional debut with Figueirense in a 2-0 Campeonato Brasileiro Série A loss to Sport Recife on 11 December 2016. On 26 August 2020, Trevisan signed with Famalicão in the Portuguese Primeira Liga. On 17 February 2021, he signed with a Japanese professional football club Oita Trinita in J1 League.

In January 2022, he signed for FC Tokyo.

== Career statistics ==
As of match played 11 April 2026

Appearances and goals by club, season and competition
Club	Season	League			State League		National Cup		League Cup		Continental		Other		Total	
Club	Season	Division	Apps	Goals	Apps	Goals	Apps	Goals	Apps	Goals	Apps	Goals	Apps	Goals	Apps	Goals
Figueirense	2015	Série A	0	0	—		0	0	—		—		—		0	0
Figueirense	2016	Série A	1	0	—		—		—		—		1 (Note: Appearances in the Primeira Liga)	0	2	0
Figueirense	2017	Série B	6	0	5 (Note: Appearances in the Campeonato Catarinense)	0	1	0	—		—		1	0	13	0
Figueirense	2018	Série B	15	3	12	0	0	0	—		—		—		27	3
Figueirense	Total		22	3	17	0	1	0	—		—		2	0	42	3
Ponte Preta (loan)	2019	Série B	19	0	3 (Note: Appearances in the Campeonato Paulista)	0	0	0	—		—		—		22	0
Ponte Preta (loan)	2020	Série B	—		13	1	3	0	—		—		—		16	1
Ponte Preta (loan)	Total		19	0	16	1	3	0	—		—		0	0	38	1
Famalicão (loan)	2020–21	Primeira Liga	4	0	—		1	0	0	0	—		—		5	0
Oita Trinita (loan)	2021	J1 League	28	2	—		3	1	3	0	—		—		34	3
FC Tokyo	2022	J1 League	6	0	—		1	0	2	0	—		—		9	0
FC Tokyo	2023	J1 League	22	1	—		3	0	6	1	—		—		31	2
FC Tokyo	2024	J1 League	17	1	—		0	0	2	0	—		—		19	1
FC Tokyo	2025	J1 League	10	1	—		2	0	2	0	—		—		14	1
FC Tokyo	Total		55	3	—		6	0	12	1	—		—		73	4
Kyoto Sanga	2026	J1 (100)	8	2	—		—		—		—		—		8	2
Career total			136	10	33	1	14	2	15	0	0	0	2	0	200	13

== Honours ==
Figueirense

- Campeonato Catarinense: 2018
