= Tsuyoshi Ogashiwa =

Japanese footballer

Tsuyoshi Ogashiwa 小柏 剛
Personal information
- Date of birth: 9 July 1998 (age 28)
- Place of birth: Gunma, Japan
- Height: 1.67 m (5 ft 6 in)
- Position: Forward

Team information
- Current team: Gamba Osaka
- Number: 24

Youth career
- 2004–2010: Fanaticos
- 2011–2016: Omiya Ardija

College career
Years	Team	Apps	(Gls)
2017–2020	Meiji University		

Senior career*
Years	Team	Apps	(Gls)
2020–2024	Hokkaido Consadole Sapporo	69	(15)
2024–2026	FC Tokyo	15	(2)
2026–	Gamba Osaka	0	(0)

International career
2013	Japan U16		
- * Club domestic league appearances and goals as of 8 October 2026

Tsuyoshi Ogashiwa (小柏 剛, Ogashiwa Tsuyoshi; born 9 July 1998) is a Japanese professional footballer who plays as a forward for J1 League club Gamba Osaka.

Primarily known for his time at Hokkaido Consadole Sapporo, Ogashiwa moved to FC Tokyo in 2024.

== Career ==
Born in Gunma Prefecture, Ogashiwa started playing football with local club Fanaticos, becoming top goalscorer for them in multiple tournaments. He later joined Omiya Ardija's youth sides and won the JFA Premier Cup in his third year, which was the first cup in Omiya Ardija Youth's history. He later joined Meiji University, where he played regularly and scored consecutive goals in the quarterfinals and semifinals of the Universiade tournament.

In February 2020, Ogashiwa was invited on a four day practice by Hokkaido Consadole Sapporo, where he impressed. On 26 March 2020, he signed a provisional contract with the club, and would join the team from the 2021 season. On 22 July 2020, he was registered as a specially designated player for the 2020 season. On 27 February 2021, Ogashiwa started in the first game of the 2021 J1 League, becoming the first homegrown player of Hokkaido Consadole Sapporo in 9 years to start in the opening game of a season since Tatsuki Nara. He scored his first J League goal against Vegalta Sendai on 24 April 2021, scoring in the 55th minute. In August 2021, Ogashiwa scored the equalizer in three consecutive games.

On 25 December 2023, Ogashiwa was announced at FC Tokyo on a permanent transfer.

== International career ==
In December 2021, Ogashiwa was called up to the senior Japan squad for a Kirin Challenge Cup 2022 match against Uzbekistan.

== Career statistics ==
=== Club ===
As of 8 October 2026.

Appearances and goals by club, season and competition
Club	Season	League			National cup (Note: Includes Emperor's Cup)		League cup (Note: Includes J.League Cup)		Total	
Club	Season	Division	Apps	Goals	Apps	Goals	Apps	Goals	Apps	Goals
Meiji University	2019	–			1	1	–		1	1
Hokkaido Consadole Sapporo	2020	J1 League	4	0	0	0	1	0	5	0
Hokkaido Consadole Sapporo	2021	J1 League	30	7	0	0	4	0	34	7
Hokkaido Consadole Sapporo	2022	J1 League	13	2	0	0	0	0	13	2
Hokkaido Consadole Sapporo	2023	J1 League	22	6	1	0	3	2	26	8
Hokkaido Consadole Sapporo	Total		69	15	1	0	8	2	78	17
FC Tokyo	2024	J1 League	11	2	0	0	1	1	12	3
FC Tokyo	2025	J1 League	3	0	0	0	1	0	4	0
FC Tokyo	2026	J1 (100)	1	0	–		–		1	0
FC Tokyo	2026–27	J1 League	0	0	1	0	0	0	1	0
FC Tokyo	Total		15	2	1	0	2	1	18	3
Gamba Osaka	2026–27	J1 League	0	0	0	0	0	0	0	0
Career total			84	17	3	1	10	3	97	21
