= Diego Oliveira (footballer, born 1987) =

Brazilian footballer

Personal information
- Full name: Diego Lochness Santos Oliveira
- Date of birth: 11 February 1987 (age 39)
- Place of birth: Camacan, Brazil
- Height: 1.74 m (5 ft 9 in)
- Positions: Winger; forward

Youth career
- Campo Grande
- 2000–2002: Bologna
- 2002–2005: Chievo

Senior career*
Years	Team	Apps	(Gls)
2005–2008	Chievo	0	(0)
2005–2007	→ Padova (loan)	15	(0)
2007–2008	→ Cittadella (loan)	29	(2)
2008–2010	Cittadella	57	(3)
2010–2011	Vicenza	11	(0)
2011–2012	Venezia	30	(12)
2012–2013	Matera	33	(9)
2013–2014	Pordenone	16	(0)
- * Club domestic league appearances and goals

Diego Lochness Santos Oliveira (born 11 February 1987) is a Brazilian footballer who plays as a forward or midfielder.

== Career ==
Oliveira started his professional career at Italian Serie A side Chievo. In July 2005, he was loaned to Padova of Serie C1.

=== Cittadella ===
He left for Serie C1 side Cittadella on 4 July 2007 on loan with option to sign him in co-ownership deal in the next season. He won promotion playoffs with club in 2008 and promoted to Serie B. He continued to play as a substitute player after the club purchased him for €500.

On 26 June 2009, Chievo bought him back for an undisclosed fee, but on 24 July 2009 returned to Cittadella in another co-ownership deal for €500. Cittadella later signed Antimo Iunco on loan and signed Oliveira outright; it sold Manuel Iori to Chievo in co-ownership deal. Oliveira started 13 Serie B matches and also played 10 league matches as substitute.

=== Vicenza ===
On 1 July 2010, he was signed by fellow Serie B side Vicenza in 3-year contract, for €130,000 (direct swap with Julián Magallanes who tagged for €130,000).

On 27 January 2011, he mutually terminated his contract to return to Brazil.

On 9 August 2011 he accepted to play in Serie D for Venezia thanks to the insistence of the Director of Football Oreste Cinquini, who previously took Oliveira in Italy when he was only thirteen.
