= Kyota Tokiwa =

Japanese footballer (born 2002)

Personal information
- Date of birth: 9 April 2002 (age 24)
- Place of birth: Tokyo, Japan
- Height: 1.72 m (5 ft 8 in)
- Position: Midfielder

Team information
- Current team: FC Tokyo
- Number: 27

Youth career
- Regista FC
- –2020: FC Tokyo

College career
Years	Team	Apps	(Gls)
2021–2024	Meiji University		

Senior career*
Years	Team	Apps	(Gls)
2019	FC Tokyo U-23	15	(1)
2025–	FC Tokyo	7	(0)
- * Club domestic league appearances and goals as of 16 September 2025

Kyota Tokiwa (常盤 亨太, Tokiwa Kyota; born 9 April 2002) is a Japanese footballer who currently plays for FC Tokyo.

== Career statistics ==
=== Club ===
As of 1 April 2021.

Club	Season	League			National Cup		League Cup		Other		Total	
Club	Season	Division	Apps	Goals	Apps	Goals	Apps	Goals	Apps	Goals	Apps	Goals
FC Tokyo U-23	2019	J3 League	15	1	–		–		0	0	15	1
Career total			15	1	0	0	0	0	0	0	15	1
