= Hotaka Nakamura =

Japanese footballer

Hotaka Nakamura 中村 帆高
Personal information
- Date of birth: 12 August 1997 (age 29)
- Place of birth: Yokosuka, Japan
- Height: 1.77 m (5 ft 10 in)
- Position: Right back

Team information
- Current team: Machida Zelvia
- Number: 88

Youth career
- 2005–2006: FC Kozaka
- 2007–2012: Yokohama F. Marinos
- 2013–2015: Nihon University Fujisawa High School

College career
| Years | Team | Apps | (Gls) |
| 2016–2019 | Meiji University | | |

Senior career*
| Years | Team | Apps | (Gls) |
| 2020–2024 | FC Tokyo | 84 | (2) |
| 2025– | Machida Zelvia | 23 | (2) |
- * Club domestic league appearances and goals as of 9 August 2026

Hotaka Nakamura (中村 帆高, Nakamura Hotaka; born 12 August 1997) is a Japanese footballer who playing as a right back and currently play for Machida Zelvia.

== Career ==
Nakamura joined first professional contract to FC Tokyo in 2020. On 23 February 2024, Nakamura made his J.League debut as a left-back in the first round of the J1 League against Shimizu S-Pulse.

On 30 December 2024, Nakamura joined to J1 club, Machida Zelvia as a permanent transfer.

== Career statistics ==
=== Club ===
As of the start from 2025 season.

| Club | Season | League | | | National Cup | | League Cup | | Continental | | Other | | Total | |
| Club | Season | Division | Apps | Goals | Apps | Goals | Apps | Goals | Apps | Goals | Apps | Goals | Apps | Goals |
|---|---|---|---|---|---|---|---|---|---|---|---|---|---|---|
| Meiji University | 2019 | – | | | 1 (Note: Appearances in the Emperor's Cup) | 0 | – | | | | | | 1 | 0 |
| FC Tokyo | 2020 | J1 League | 28 | 1 | 0 | 0 | 3 (Note: Appearances in the J.League Cup) | 0 | 6 (Note: Appearances in the 2020 AFC Champions League qualifying play-offs) | 0 | – | | 37 | 1 |
| FC Tokyo | 2021 | J1 League | 8 | 0 | 0 | 0 | 1 | 0 | – | | | | 9 | 0 |
| FC Tokyo | 2022 | J1 League | 22 | 0 | 1 | 0 | 6 | 0 | – | | | | 29 | 0 |
| FC Tokyo | 2023 | J1 League | 7 | 1 | 0 | 0 | 1 | 0 | – | | | | 8 | 0 |
| FC Tokyo | 2024 | J1 League | 19 | 0 | 2 | 0 | 2 | 0 | – | | | | 23 | 0 |
| Machida Zelvia | 2025 | J1 League | 0 | 0 | 0 | 0 | 0 | 0 | 0 | 0 | – | | 0 | 0 |
| Career total | | | 84 | 2 | 4 | 0 | 13 | 0 | 6 | 0 | 0 | 0 | 107 | 2 |

== Honours ==
=== Club ===
FC Tokyo

- J.League Cup : 2020

Machida Zelvia

- Emperor's Cup: 2025
