= Manato Shinada =

Japanese footballer

Manato Shinada 品田 愛斗
Personal information
- Full name: Manato Shinada
- Date of birth: September 19, 1999 (age 27)
- Place of birth: Saitama, Japan
- Height: 1.80 m (5 ft 11 in)
- Position: Defensive midfielder

Team information
- Current team: JEF United Chiba
- Number: 44

Youth career
- FC Tokyo

Senior career*
Years	Team	Apps	(Gls)
2016–2024	FC Tokyo	20	(1)
2016–2019	→ FC Tokyo U-23 (loan)	82	(0)
2023–24	→ Ventforet Kofu (loan)	0	(0)
2024	JEF United Chiba (Loan)	24	(0)
2025–	JEF United Chiba	38	(0)
Total		164	(1)
- * Club domestic league appearances and goals as of 12 August 2026

Manato Shinada (品田 愛斗, Shinada Manato; born September 19, 1999) is a Japanese footballer who plays as defensive midfielder for J2 League club JEF United Chiba.

== Career ==
Manato Shinada joined FC Tokyo in 2016. On September 11, he debuted in J3 League (v Grulla Morioka).

== Career statistics ==
As of 13 February 2023

Appearances and goals by club, season and competition
Club	Season	League			National Cup		League Cup		Other		Total	
Club	Season	Division	Apps	Goals	Apps	Goals	Apps	Goals	Apps	Goals	Apps	Goals
Japan			League		Emperor's Cup		J.League Cup		Other		Total	
FC Tokyo U-23 (loan)	2016	J3 League	1	0	–		–		–		1	0
FC Tokyo U-23 (loan)	2017	J3 League	18	0	–		–		–		18	0
FC Tokyo U-23 (loan)	2018	J3 League	31	0	–		–		–		31	0
FC Tokyo U-23 (loan)	2019	J3 League	32	0	–		–		–		32	0
FC Tokyo U-23 (loan)	Total		82	0	0	0	0	0	0	0	82	0
FC Tokyo	2018	J1 League	1	0	1	0	3	0	–		5	0
FC Tokyo	2019	J1 League	0	0	0	0	1	0	–		1	0
FC Tokyo	2020	J1 League	9	1	0	0	1	0	1 (Note: Appearance in the AFC Champions League)	0	10	0
FC Tokyo	2021	J1 League	8	0	1	0	4	0	–		13	0
FC Tokyo	2022	J1 League	2	0	0	0	3	0	–		5	0
FC Tokyo	Total		20	1	2	0	12	0	1	0	35	1
Ventforet Kofu (loan)	2023	J2 League	0	0	0	0	–		–		0	0
Career total			102	1	2	0	12	0	1	0	117	1
