= Christian Jidayi =

Italian football player and coach (1987–2026)

Personal information
- Date of birth: 3 March 1987
- Place of birth: Avellino, Italy
- Date of death: 17 February 2026 (aged 38)
- Place of death: Ravenna, Italy
- Height: 1.85 m (6 ft 1 in)
- Position: Defender

Youth career
- Cesena

Senior career*
Years	Team	Apps	(Gls)
2006–2009	Cesena	5	(0)
2006–2007	→ Bellaria–Igea (loan)	28	(3)
2008–2009	→ Mantova (loan)	0	(0)
2009	→ Bassano (loan)	7	(0)
2009–2016	Novara	1	(0)
2010–2011	→ Lecco (loan)	18	(0)
2012–2013	→ VdA St.Christophe (loan)	25	(3)
2013–2015	→ Forlì (loan)	44	(1)
2015–2016	→ Pro Patria (loan)	14	(0)
- * Club domestic league appearances and goals

Christian Jidayi (3 March 1987 – 17 February 2026) was an Italian football player and coach.

== Career ==
Born in Avellino, Campania, Jidayi began his career with A.C. Cesena in Romagna. He left the under-20 reserve team in 2006 for Bellaria – Igea Marina. Jidayi returned to Cesena for 2007–08 Serie B, playing five times. Jidayi was swapped to Mantova on 30 June 2008 for Stefano Mondini in co-ownership deal, both 50% registration rights were tagged for €750,000. Jidayi spent half season with the Serie B club. On 2 February 2009, Jidayi left for Bassano. In June 2009 both Jidayi and Mondini returned to their mother clubs for the same price. Jidayi signed a two-year contract. Cesena swapped Jidayi again on 31 August 2009, with José Espinal of Novara Calcio. Both players were valued €1.5 million. Jidayi signed a five-year contract. However, except for the financial effect, Jidayi never had a chance with Novara. He left for Lecco in 2010 and became a ghost player of Novara in 2011–12 Serie A. On 3 August 2012, he left for the fourth division club Saint-Christophe Vallée d’Aoste. On 28 August 2013, he signed for Forlì, also in the Lega Pro Seconda Divisione.

On 16 September 2015, he was signed by Pro Patria in a temporary deal. He then briefly served as assistant coach of San Marino from 2017 to 2019.

== Personal life and death ==
After retiring from active football, Jidayi became a policeman, serving in the city of Gambettola until the summer of 2025, and successively in the provincial police of Ravenna. On the night of 17–18 February 2026, he was found dead in a pine forest in Ravenna. Jidayi was 38.

Christian's brother William was also a professional footballer.
