= Shuto Okaniwa =

Japanese footballer

Shuto Okaniwa 岡庭 愁人
Personal information
- Full name: Shuto Okaniwa
- Date of birth: 16 September 1999 (age 27)
- Place of birth: Saitama, Japan
- Height: 1.68 m (5 ft 6 in)
- Position: Right back

Team information
- Current team: Iwaki FC
- Number: 37

Youth career
- –2009: Regista FC
- 2010–2015: FC Tokyo

Senior career*
Years	Team	Apps	(Gls)
2016–2025	FC Tokyo	1	(0)
2022–2024	→ Omiya Ardija (loan)	56	(0)
2024	→ JEF United Chiba (loan)	30	(3)
2025	→ Renofa Yamaguchi FC (loan)	38	(0)
2026–	Shonan Bellmare	7	(0)
2026–	→ Iwaki FC (loan)	1	(0)
- * Club domestic league appearances and goals as of 14 August 2026

Shuto Okaniwa (岡庭 愁人, Okaniwa Shūto; born 16 September 1999) is a Japanese professional footballer who plays as a right back for Iwaki FC, on loan from J2 League club Shonan Bellmare.

== Career ==
Shuto Okaniwa joined FC Tokyo in 2016. On 11 September 2016, he debuted in J3 League against Grulla Morioka.

In July 2022, Okaniwa moved on loan to Omiya Ardija.

== Career statistics ==
As of 31 March 2026

Appearances and goals by club, season and competition
Club	Season	League			National cup (Note: Includes Emperors Cup)		League cup (Note: Includes J.League Cup)		Total	
Club	Season	Division	Apps	Goals	Apps	Goals	Apps	Goals	Apps	Goals
Meiji University	2019	–			1	0	–		1	0
FC Tokyo	2021	J1 League	1	0	–		1	0	2	0
FC Tokyo	2022	J1 League	0	0	–		2	0	2	0
FC Tokyo	Total		1	0	0	0	3	0	4	0
RB Omiya Ardija (loan)	2022	J2 League	14	0	0	0	–		14	0
RB Omiya Ardija (loan)	2023	J2 League	42	0	2	0	–		44	0
RB Omiya Ardija (loan)	Total		56	0	2	0	0	0	58	0
JEF United Chiba (loan)	2024	J2 League	30	3	3	0	1	0	34	3
Renofa Yamaguchi FC (loan)	2025	J2 League	38	0	–		–		38	0
Shonan Bellmare	2026	J2/J3 (100)	4	0	–		–		4	0
Career total			129	3	6	0	4	0	139	3
