= Kashif Bangnagande =

Japanese footballer

Kashif Bangnagande バングーナガンデ 佳史扶
Personal information
- Date of birth: 24 September 2001 (age 25)
- Place of birth: Tokyo, Japan
- Height: 1.76 m (5 ft 9 in)
- Position: Left back

Team information
- Current team: FC Tokyo
- Number: 6

Youth career
- 2011–2013: FC Habilista
- 2014–2019: FC Tokyo

Senior career*
Years	Team	Apps	(Gls)
2018–2019	FC Tokyo U-23	25	(0)
2020–	FC Tokyo	68	(3)

International career^{‡}
2018	Japan U17	3	(0)
2019	Japan U18	5	(0)
2020	Japan U19		
2021	Japan U20		
2023–	Japan	1	(0)
- * Club domestic league appearances and goals as of 13 September 2025 ‡ National team caps and goals as of 28 March 2023, 14:26 (UTC)

Kashif Bangnagande (バングーナガンデ 佳史扶, Bangunagande Kashifu; born 24 September 2001) is a Japanese professional footballer who plays as a left-back for J1 League club FC Tokyo.

== Club career ==
In 2018, Bangnagande began his professional career with J3 League club FC Tokyo U-23, a today extinct under-23 team of FC Tokyo that had operated until 2019.

In 2020, Bangnagande was promoted to FC Tokyo's first team. On 27 September, he debuted in the J1 League against Sagan Tosu. He started to win regular playing time with FC Tokyo from the 2022 season, starting as a left-back for many matches throughout the season, and simultaneously pushing veteran teammate Yuto Nagatomo to the right-back role.

In January 2024, he renewed his contract with FC Tokyo for the 2024 season.

== International career ==
Bangnagande has represented Japan at youth level since 2018, having played up to the Japan U20s.

In March 2023, he was called up to the Japan national team for the first time by manager Hajime Moriyasu to play in the 2023 Kirin Challenge Cup. He debuted on 28 March 2023 against Colombia in a match that ended with a 2–1 loss for Japan.

== Personal life ==
Bangnagande was born in Adachi, Tokyo to a Ghanaian Gonja father and a Japanese mother.

== Career statistics ==
=== Club ===
As of 14 March 2023.

Club	Season	League			National Cup		League Cup		Continental		Other		Total	
Club	Season	Division	Apps	Goals	Apps	Goals	Apps	Goals	Apps	Goals	Apps	Goals	Apps	Goals
FC Tokyo U-23	2018	J3 League	12	0	–		–		–		0	0	12	0
FC Tokyo U-23	2019	J3 League	13	0	–		–		–		0	0	13	0
FC Tokyo U-23	Total		25	0	0	0	0	0	0	0	0	0	25	0
FC Tokyo	2019	J1 League	0	0	0	0	2 (Note: Appearances in the J. League Cup)	0	–		0	0	2	0
FC Tokyo	2020	J1 League	2	0	0	0	0	0	0	0	0	0	2	0
FC Tokyo	2021	J1 League	7	0	1 (Note: Appearances in the Emperor's Cup)	0	7	0	0	0	0	0	15	0
FC Tokyo	2022	J1 League	17	1	2	0	3	0	0	0	0	0	22	1
FC Tokyo	2023	J1 League	4	0	0	0	0	0	0	0	0	0	4	0
FC Tokyo	Total		30	1	3	0	13	0	0	0	0	0	46	1
Career total			55	1	3	0	13	0	0	0	0	0	71	1
