= FC Tokyo U-23 =

- Full name: FC Tokyo Under-23
- Founded: 2016
- Dissolved: 2020
- Ground: Ajinomoto Field Nishigaoka
- Capacity: 7,137
- Manager: Tadashi Nakamura
- League: J3 League
- Website: www.fctokyo.co.jp
Home colours	Away colours

FC Tokyo Under−23 was a Japanese football club based in Tokyo. It was the reserve team of FC Tokyo and played in J3 League which they have done since their entry to the league at the beginning of the 2016 season. The club shared its home games between Ajinomoto Field Nishigaoka and the smaller Yumenoshima Stadium.

== History ==
FC Tokyo joined J3 League in 2016 along with the reserve teams of Gamba Osaka and Cerezo Osaka. None of these clubs are eligible for promotion to J2 League additionally they can only field 3 players over the age of 23.

== Last squad ==
2020 squad for 2020 J3 League

Note: Flags indicate national team as defined under FIFA eligibility rules; some limited exceptions apply. Players may hold more than one non-FIFA nationality.

No.	Pos.	Nation	Player
1	GK	(Japan) JPN	Tsuyoshi Kodama
5	DF	(Japan) JPN	Daiki Niwa
6	DF	(Japan) JPN	Kosuke Ota
13	GK	(Japan) JPN	Go Hatano
19	MF	(Japan) JPN	Kiwara Miyazaki
21	MF	(South Korea) KOR	Yu In-soo
22	DF	(Japan) JPN	Takumi Nakamura
23	FW	(Japan) JPN	Kiichi Yajima
24	FW	(Japan) JPN	Taichi Hara
27	FW	(Japan) JPN	Kyosuke Tagawa
28	MF	(Japan) JPN	Takuya Uchida
29	DF	(Japan) JPN	Makoto Okazaki
32	DF	(Japan) JPN	Tsuyoshi Watanabe
36	MF	(Japan) JPN	Shuto Abe
38	MF	(Japan) JPN	Kyota Tokiwa
38	MF	(Japan) JPN	Riku Kobayashi

No.	Pos.	Nation	Player
40	MF	(Japan) JPN	Rei Hirakawa
41	GK	(Japan) JPN	Taishi Brandon Nozawa
42	DF	(Japan) JPN	Kashifu Bangunagande
43	DF	(Japan) JPN	Seiji Kimura
44	MF	(Japan) JPN	Manato Shinada
45	MF	(Brazil) BRA	Arthur Silva
46	MF	(Japan) JPN	Kazuya Konno
47	DF	(Japan) JPN	Teppei Oka
47	DF	(Japan) JPN	Rio Omori
48	FW	(Japan) JPN	Izumi Miyata
49	DF	(Japan) JPN	Shingo Morita
50	MF	(North Korea) PRK	Kim Song-min
50	MF	(Japan) JPN	Kosei Numata
51	GK	(Japan) JPN	Yoshihito Iizuka
51	GK	(Japan) JPN	Yu Kanoshima
52	FW	(Japan) JPN	Seiichiro Kubo
