= J.League awards =

Japanese association football awards

The J.League awards are represented by a ceremony, which is hosted every year in December, at the end of the season. This ceremony was inducted to award the best players of J.League. To win this award, the nominees had to play at least 17 matches of the season. All awards are updated to 2021.

== Player of the Year ==
The J.League Player of the Year (formerly known as the "J.League Most Valuable Player Award" from 1993 to 2020) is awarded by the J.League to the most valuable player of the season.

Year	Player	Club	Ref
1993	(Japan) Kazuyoshi Miura	Verdy Kawasaki	
1994	(Brazil) Pereira	Verdy Kawasaki	
1995	(Socialist Federal Republic of Yugoslavia) Dragan Stojković	Nagoya Grampus Eight	
1996	(Brazil) Jorginho	Kashima Antlers	
1997	(Brazil) Dunga	Júbilo Iwata	
1998	(Japan) Masashi Nakayama	Júbilo Iwata	
1999	(Brazil) Alex	Shimizu S-Pulse	
2000	(Japan) Shunsuke Nakamura	Yokohama F. Marinos	
2001	(Japan) Toshiya Fujita	Júbilo Iwata	
2002	(Japan) Naohiro Takahara	Júbilo Iwata	
2003	(Brazil) Emerson Sheik	Urawa Red Diamonds	
2004	(Japan) Yuji Nakazawa	Yokohama F. Marinos	
2005	(Brazil) Araújo	Gamba Osaka	
2006	(Japan) Marcus Tulio Tanaka	Urawa Red Diamonds	
2007	(Brazil) Robson Ponte	Urawa Red Diamonds	
2008	(Brazil) Marquinhos	Kashima Antlers	
2009	(Japan) Mitsuo Ogasawara	Kashima Antlers	
2010	(Japan) Seigo Narazaki	Nagoya Grampus	
2011	(Brazil) Leandro Domingues	Kashiwa Reysol	
2012	(Japan) Hisato Satō	Sanfrecce Hiroshima	
2013	(Japan) Shunsuke Nakamura (2)	Yokohama F. Marinos	
2014	(Japan) Yasuhito Endō	Gamba Osaka	
2015	(Japan) Toshihiro Aoyama	Sanfrecce Hiroshima	
2016	(Japan) Kengo Nakamura	Kawasaki Frontale	
2017	(Japan) Yū Kobayashi	Kawasaki Frontale	
2018	(Japan) Akihiro Ienaga	Kawasaki Frontale	
2019	(Japan) Teruhito Nakagawa	Yokohama F. Marinos	
2020	(Kenya) Michael Olunga	Kashiwa Reysol	
2021	(Brazil) Leandro Damião	Kawasaki Frontale	
2022	(Japan) Tomoki Iwata	Yokohama F. Marinos	
2023	(Japan) Yuya Osako	Vissel Kobe	
2024	(Japan) Yoshinori Muto	Vissel Kobe	
2025	(Japan) Tomoki Hayakawa	Kashima Antlers	

== Top scorer ==
The J.League Top Scorer is awarded by the J.League to the top scoring player of the season.

Only five players won this award twice: Masashi Nakayama, Ryoichi Maeda, Joshua Kennedy and Yoshito Okubo. Other five players won both the top-scorer award and the one for Most Valuable Player: Masashi Nakayama in 1998, Naohiro Takahara in 2002, Marquinhos in 2008, Hisato Sato in 2012, Yu Kobayashi in 2017 and Yuya Osako in 2023.

Year	Player	Goals	Club	Ref
1993	(Argentina) Ramón Díaz	28	Yokohama Marinos	
1994	(Germany) Frank Ordenewitz	30	JEF United Ichihara	
1995	(Japan) Masahiro Fukuda	32	Urawa Red Diamonds	
1996	(Japan) Kazuyoshi Miura	23	Verdy Kawasaki	
1997	(Cameroon) Patrick Mboma	25	Gamba Osaka	
1998	(Japan) Masashi Nakayama	36	Júbilo Iwata	
1999	(South Korea) Hwang Sun-Hong	24	Cerezo Osaka	
2000	(Japan) Masashi Nakayama (2)	20	Júbilo Iwata	
2001	(Brazil) Will	24	Consadole Sapporo	
2002	(Japan) Naohiro Takahara	26	Júbilo Iwata	
2003	(Brazil) Ueslei	22	Nagoya Grampus Eight	
2004	(Brazil) Emerson Sheik	27	Urawa Red Diamonds	
2005	(Brazil) Araújo	33	Gamba Osaka	
2006	(Brazil) Washington	26	Urawa Red Diamonds	
2006	(Brazil) Magno Alves	26	Gamba Osaka	
2007	(Brazil) Juninho	22	Kawasaki Frontale	
2008	(Brazil) Marquinhos	21	Kashima Antlers	
2009	(Japan) Ryoichi Maeda	20	Júbilo Iwata	
2010	(Japan) Ryoichi Maeda	17	Júbilo Iwata	
2010	(Australia) Joshua Kennedy	17	Nagoya Grampus	
2011	(Australia) Joshua Kennedy (2)	19	Nagoya Grampus	
2012	(Japan) Hisato Satō	22	Sanfrecce Hiroshima	
2013	(Japan) Yoshito Ōkubo	26	Kawasaki Frontale	
2014	(Japan) Yoshito Ōkubo (2)	18	Kawasaki Frontale	
2015	(Japan) Yoshito Ōkubo (3)	23	Kawasaki Frontale	
2016	(Nigeria) Peter Utaka	19	Sanfrecce Hiroshima	
2016	(Brazil) Leandro	19	Vissel Kobe	
2017	(Japan) Yū Kobayashi	23	Kawasaki Frontale	
2018	(Brazil) Jô	24	Nagoya Grampus	
2019	(Japan) Teruhito Nakagawa	15	Yokohama F. Marinos	
2019	(Brazil) Marcos Júnior	15	Yokohama F. Marinos	
2020	(Kenya) Michael Olunga	28	Kashiwa Reysol	
2021	(Brazil) Leandro Damião	23	Kawasaki Frontale	
2021	(Japan) Daizen Maeda	23	Yokohama F. Marinos	
2022	(Brazil) Thiago Santana	14	Shimizu S-Pulse	
2023	(Japan) Yuya Osako	22	Vissel Kobe	
2023	(Brazil) Anderson Lopes	22	Yokohama F. Marinos	
2024	(Brazil) Anderson Lopes (2)	24	Yokohama F. Marinos	
2025	(Brazil) Léo Ceará	21	Kashima Antlers	

== Best Young Player ==
The J.League Best Young Player (formerly known as the "J.League Rookie of the Year" from 1993 to 2019) is awarded by the J.League to the most outstanding rookie of the season. To be considered a rookie, there are some criteria to meet:

- a player must be in his first professional year of football (domestically or abroad);
- a player must have played more than half of the season;
- in date 2 April of the incumbent season, he has to be under 21 years old;
- whoever has already won this award, he's excluded from running for it again.

The youngest-ever winner is Takayuki Morimoto: he won the award in 2004 at the age of 16.

Players names shown in bold were also named in the best eleven for that season.

Year	Player	Club	Position	Ref
1993	(Japan) Masaaki Sawanobori	Shimizu S-Pulse	MF	
1994	(Japan) Kazuaki Tasaka	Bellmare Hiratsuka	MF	
1995	(Japan) Yoshikatsu Kawaguchi	Yokohama Marinos	GK	
1996	(Japan) Toshihide Saito	Shimizu S-Pulse	DF	
1997	(Japan) Atsushi Yanagisawa	Kashima Antlers	FW	
1998	(Japan) Shinji Ono	Urawa Red Diamonds	MF	
1999	(Japan) Yuji Nakazawa	Verdy Kawasaki	DF	
2000	(Japan) Kazuyuki Morisaki	Sanfrecce Hiroshima	DF	
2001	(Japan) Koji Yamase	Consadole Sapporo	MF	
2002	(Japan) Keisuke Tsuboi	Urawa Red Diamonds	DF	
2003	(Japan) Daisuke Nasu	Yokohama F. Marinos	DF	
2004	(Japan) Takayuki Morimoto	Tokyo Verdy 1969	FW	
2005	(Japan) Robert Cullen	Júbilo Iwata	FW	
2006	(Japan) Jungo Fujimoto	Shimizu S-Pulse	MF	
2007	(Japan) Takanori Sugeno	Yokohama FC	GK	
2008	(Japan) Yoshizumi Ogawa	Nagoya Grampus	MF	
2009	(Japan) Kazuma Watanabe	Yokohama F. Marinos	FW	
2010	(Japan) Takashi Usami	Gamba Osaka	MF	
2011	**(Japan) Hiroki Sakai**	Kashiwa Reysol	DF	
2012	(Japan) Gaku Shibasaki	Kashima Antlers	MF	
2013	(Japan) Takumi Minamino	Cerezo Osaka	FW	
2014	(Brazil) Caio Lucas	Kashima Antlers	MF	
2015	(Japan) Takuma Asano	Sanfrecce Hiroshima	FW	
2016	(Japan) Yosuke Ideguchi	Gamba Osaka	MF	
2017	(Japan) Yūta Nakayama	Kashiwa Reysol	DF	
2018	(Japan) Hiroki Abe	Kashima Antlers	MF	
2019	(Japan) Ao Tanaka	Kawasaki Frontale	MF	
2020	(Japan) Ayumu Seko	Cerezo Osaka	DF	
2021	(Japan) Ryōtarō Araki	Kashima Antlers	MF	
2022	(Japan) Mao Hosoya	Kashiwa Reysol	FW	
2023	(Japan) Shunsuke Mito	Albirex Niigata	MF	
2024	(Japan) Kōta Takai	Kawasaki Frontale	DF	
2025	(Japan) Ryūnosuke Satō	Fagiano Okayama	MF	

== Manager of the Year ==
The J.League Manager of the Year is an annual award given to one manager by the J.League based on their performance during the season. In the past, the award usually went to the manager of the champions, though this has varied somewhat over the years. From 2017, the award was modified so that the Manager of the J.League champion wins the J.League Champion Manager of the Year, and a separate J.League Manager of the Year award is given to a Manager from each of the J.Leagues (J1, J2 and J3). The list below reflects the award for J1 League Manager of the Year award only.

Year	Manager	Club	Ref
1993	(Japan) Yasutaro Matsuki	Verdy Kawasaki	
1994	(Japan) Yasutaro Matsuki (2)	Verdy Kawasaki	
1995	(France) Arsène Wenger	Nagoya Grampus Eight	
1996	(Brazil) Nicanor	Kashiwa Reysol	
1997	(Brazil) João Carlos	Kashima Antlers	
1998	(Argentina) Osvaldo Ardiles	Shimizu S-Pulse	
1999	(England) Steve Perryman	Shimizu S-Pulse	
2000	(Japan) Akira Nishino	Kashiwa Reysol	
2001	(Japan) Masakazu Suzuki	Júbilo Iwata	
2002	(Japan) Masakazu Suzuki (2)	Júbilo Iwata	
2003	(Japan) Takeshi Okada	Yokohama F. Marinos	
2004	(Japan) Takeshi Okada (2)	Yokohama F. Marinos	
2005	(Japan) Akira Nishino (2)	Gamba Osaka	
2006	(Germany) Guido Buchwald	Urawa Red Diamonds	
2007	(Brazil) Oswaldo de Oliveira	Kashima Antlers	
2008	(Brazil) Oswaldo de Oliveira (2)	Kashima Antlers	
2009	(Brazil) Oswaldo de Oliveira (3)	Kashima Antlers	
2010	(Serbia) Dragan Stojković	Nagoya Grampus	
2011	(Brazil) Nelsinho Baptista	Kashiwa Reysol	
2012	(Japan) Hajime Moriyasu	Sanfrecce Hiroshima	
2013	(Japan) Hajime Moriyasu (2)	Sanfrecce Hiroshima	
2014	(Japan) Kenta Hasegawa	Gamba Osaka	
2015	(Japan) Hajime Moriyasu (3)	Sanfrecce Hiroshima	
2016	(Japan) Masatada Ishii	Kashima Antlers	
2017	(South Korea) Yoon Jong-hwan	Cerezo Osaka	
2018	(Serbia) Mihailo Petrović	Hokkaido Consadole Sapporo	
2019	(Japan) Tomohiro Katanosaka	Oita Trinita	
2020	(Japan) Tsuneyasu Miyamoto	Gamba Osaka	
2021	(Spain) Ricardo Rodríguez	Urawa Red Diamonds	
2022	(Germany) Michael Skibbe	Sanfrecce Hiroshima	
2023	(Japan) Shigetoshi Hasebe	Avispa Fukuoka	
2024	(Germany) Michael Skibbe (2)	Sanfrecce Hiroshima	
2025	(Spain) Ricardo Rodríguez (2)	Kashiwa Reysol	

== Goal of the Year ==
=== J1 League winners ===
Season	Player	Club	Scored against	Round	Date	Ref
2013	(Japan) Yoichiro Kakitani	Cerezo Osaka	Kashima Antlers	33	30 November 2013	
2014	(Japan) Daigo Nishi	Kashima Antlers	Sanfrecce Hiroshima	18	19 July 2014	
2015	(Japan) Toshihiro Aoyama	Sanfrecce Hiroshima	Sagan Tosu	17	27 June 2015	
2016	(Japan) Taishi Taguchi	Nagoya Grampus	Kashima Antlers	13	21 May 2016	
2017	(Japan) Takahiro Sekine	Urawa Red Diamonds	Sanfrecce Hiroshima	17	8 July 2017	
2018	(Japan) Ryota Oshima	Kawasaki Frontale	Vissel Kobe	30	20 October 2018	
2019	(Spain) David Villa	Vissel Kobe	Nagoya Grampus	17	30 June 2019	
2020	(Japan) Mitsuki Saito	Shonan Bellmare	Vissel Kobe	27	21 November 2020	
2021	(Japan) Yoichiro Kakitani	Nagoya Grampus	Cerezo Osaka	37	27 November 2021	
2022	(Japan) Takumu Kawamura	Sanfrecce Hiroshima	Shimizu S-Pulse	28	3 September 2022	
2023	(Japan) Ryoma Watanabe	FC Tokyo	Cerezo Osaka	8	15 April 2023	
2024	(Japan) Takashi Usami	Gamba Osaka	Hokkaido Consadole Sapporo	33	30 November 2024	
2025	(Brazil) Léo Ceará	Kashima Antlers	Kashiwa Reysol	24	25 July 2025	

== Fair Play Award ==
The goal is to be under the 1 point-media to win the award. For J.League the limit is 34, while in J.League 2 and J3 League the limit is respectively 42 and 33. In bold the winners of Prince Takamado Cup.

Year	J1-winning team	J2-winning team	J3-winning team
1993	not assigned	League non-existing	League non-existing
1994	not assigned	League non-existing	League non-existing
1995	not assigned	League non-existing	League non-existing
1996	not assigned	League non-existing	League non-existing
1997	Vissel Kobe	League non-existing	League non-existing
1998	not assigned	League non-existing	League non-existing
1999	not assigned	not assigned	League non-existing
2000	not assigned	not assigned	League non-existing
2001	not assigned	not assigned	League non-existing
2002	not assigned	not assigned	League non-existing
2003	not assigned	not assigned	League non-existing
2004	not assigned	not assigned	League non-existing
2005	not assigned	not assigned	League non-existing
2006	not assigned	not assigned	League non-existing
2007	**Gamba Osaka**	not assigned	League non-existing
2008	**Shimizu S-Pulse**, Gamba Osaka	Vegalta Sendai	League non-existing
2009	**Júbilo Iwata**, Montedio Yamagata	Vegalta Sendai	League non-existing
2010	**Sanfrecce Hiroshima**, Montedio Yamagata, Yokohama F. Marinos	not assigned	League non-existing
2011	**Gamba Osaka**, Montedio Yamagata	FC Tokyo	League non-existing
2012	**Sanfrecce Hiroshima**, Kawasaki Frontale	not assigned	League non-existing
2013	**Sanfrecce Hiroshima**, Vegalta Sendai	Gamba Osaka, Vissel Kobe, Matsumoto Yamaga, Fagiano Okayama	League non-existing
2014	**Sanfrecce Hiroshima**, Vegalta Sendai, Urawa Red Diamonds, Yokohama F. Marinos, Albirex Niigata, Tokushima Vortis	Montedio Yamagata, Thespakusatsu Gunma, Shonan Bellmare, Matsumoto Yamaga, Júbilo Iwata, Kyoto Sanga, Fagiano Okayama, Giravanz Kitakyushu	Fukushima United, Fujieda MYFC, Nagano Parceiro
2015	**Sanfrecce Hiroshima**, Montedio Yamagata, Kawasaki Frontale, Yokohama F. Marinos, Ventforet Kofu, Matsumoto Yamaga, Gamba Osaka, Sagan Tosu	Zweigen Kanazawa, Fagiano Okayama, Tokushima Vortis, Ehime FC, Giravanz Kitakyushu	Grulla Morioka, Blaublitz Akita, Nagano Parceiro
2016	**Sanfrecce Hiroshima**, Urawa Red Diamonds, Sagan Tosu, Kashima Antlers, Kawasaki Frontale	Shimizu S-Pulse, Giravanz Kitakyushu, Tokushima Vortis, Thespakusatsu Gunma, Fagiano Okayama	Grulla Morioka, YSCC Yokohama, Oita Trinita, Fujieda MYFC
2017	**Sanfrecce Hiroshima**, Vegalta Sendai, Cerezo Osaka, FC Tokyo, Sagan Tosu, Kawasaki Frontale, Gamba Osaka, Júbilo Iwata	Oita Trinita, Matsumoto Yamaga FC, Ehime FC, Tokyo Verdy, Fagiano Okayama, Montedio Yamagata, Zweigen Kanazawa	Blaublitz Akita, Azul Claro Numazu, YSCC Yokohama, Cerezo Osaka U-23, Grulla Morioka, Nagano Parceiro, Fukushima United FC
2018	**Cerezo Osaka**, Urawa Red Diamonds, Sanfrecce Hiroshima	Oita Trinita	Blaublitz Akita
2019	**FC Tokyo**, Sanfrecce Hiroshima, Oita Trinita	Fagiano Okayama	Cerezo Osaka U-23
2020	**Oita Trinita**, Kawasaki Frontale, Gamba Osaka	Giravanz Kitakyushu	Blaublitz Akita
2021	**Kawasaki Frontale**, Urawa Red Diamonds, Oita Trinita	Montedio Yamagata	Gainare Tottori
2022	**Urawa Red Diamonds**, Vissel Kobe, Sanfrecce Hiroshima, Nagoya Grampus, Cerezo Osaka, Shonan Bellmare, FC Tokyo	Albirex Niigata, Omiya Ardija, V-Varen Nagasaki, Thespakusatsu Gunma, Ventforet Kofu, Fagiano Okayama, JEF United Chiba, Roasso Kumamoto, Tokyo Verdy, Zweigen Kanazawa, Blaublitz Akita, Oita Trinita, Yokohama FC, Montedio Yamagata	Kataller Toyama, Vanraure Hachinohe, Tegevajaro Miyazaki, Iwaki FC, Kamatamare Sanuki, Fukushima United, Azul Claro Numazu, Ehime FC, Gainare Tottori, Giravanz Kitakyushu
2025	Vissel Kobe, Sanfrecce Hiroshima, Albirex Niigata		

== Individual Fair Play Award ==
This award was established since 1996.

Year	Footballer	Position	Club	Nationality	Ref
1996	Masayuki Okano	FW	Urawa Reds	Japan	
1997	Akihiro Nagashima	FW	Vissel Kobe	Japan	
1998	Naoki Soma	DF	Kashima Antlers	Japan	
1999	Not assigned				
2000	Atsushi Yoneyama	DF	Tokyo Verdy	Japan	
2001	Yuta Minami	GK	Kashiwa Reysol	Japan	
2002	Keisuke Tsuboi	DF	Urawa Reds	Japan	
2003	Yuichi Nemoto	DF	Vegalta Sendai	Japan	
2003	Hitoshi Sogahata	GK	Kashima Antlers	Japan	
2003	Naohiro Ishikawa	MF	FC Tokyo	Japan	
2003	Shohei Ikeda	DF	Shimizu S-Pulse	Japan	
2004	Takashi Shimoda	GK	Sanfrecce Hiroshima	Japan	
2004	Yoshinari Takagi	GK	Yokohama F. Marinos	Japan	
2005	Teruyuki Moniwa	DF	FC Tokyo	Japan	
2005	Masashi Oguro	FW	Gamba Osaka	Japan	
2006	Satoru Yamagishi	MF	JEF United Chiba	Japan	
2006	Yuichi Nemoto	DF	Oita Trinita	Japan	
2007	Daisuke Sakata	FW	Yokohama F. Marinos	Japan	
2007	Hisato Sato	FW	Sanfrecce Hiroshima	Japan	
2007	Teruyoshi Ito	MF	Shimizu S-Pulse	Japan	
2008	Yoshikatsu Kawaguchi	GK	Júbilo Iwata	Japan	
2009	Eiji Kawashima	GK	Kawasaki Frontale	Japan	
2009	Kota Hattori	MF	Sanfrecce Hiroshima	Japan	
2010	Tomoaki Makino	DF	Sanfrecce Hiroshima	Japan	
2011	Ryang Yong-gi	MF	Vegalta Sendai	North Korea	
2011	Kosuke Ota	DF	Shimizu S-Pulse	Japan	
2012	Hisato Satō	FW	Sanfrecce Hiroshima	Japan	
2013	Yoichiro Kakitani	FW	Cerezo Osaka	Japan	
2013	Hisato Satō	FW	Sanfrecce Hiroshima	Japan	
2014	Shusaku Nishikawa	GK	Urawa Reds	Japan	
2014	Masato Kudo	FW	Kashiwa Reysol	Japan	
2014	Ryota Morioka	MF	Vissel Kobe	Japan	
2014	Yohei Toyoda	FW	Sagan Tosu	Japan	
2014	Hiroki Mizumoto	DF	Sanfrecce Hiroshima	Japan	
2014	Yasuhiro Hiraoka	DF	Shimizu S-Pulse	Japan	
2015	Shogo Taniguchi	MF	Kawasaki Frontale	Japan	
2015	Yuji Nakazawa	DF	Yokohama F. Marinos	Japan	
2016	Yota Akimoto	GK	FC Tokyo	Japan	
2016	Yūsuke Tanaka	MF	Ventforet Kofu	Japan	
2017	Yuji Nakazawa	DF	Yokohama F. Marinos	Japan	
2017	Yoichiro Kakitani	FW	Cerezo Osaka	Japan	
2017	Hiroki Mizumoto	DF	Sanfrecce Hiroshima	Japan	
2018	Shusaku Nishikawa	GK	Urawa Reds	Japan	
2018	Yota Akimoto	GK	Shonan Bellmare	Japan	
2018	Takashi Sawada	FW	V-Varen Nagasaki	Japan	
2019	Not assigned				
2020	Hotaru Yamaguchi	MF	Vissel Kobe	Japan	
2021	Miki Yamane	DF	Kawasaki Frontale	Japan	
2022	Not assigned				
2023	Not assigned				
2024	Not assigned				
2025	Daiya Maekawa	GK	Vissel Kobe	Japan	

== Referees of the Year ==
Year	Referee	Assistant Referee	Ref
2013	Yuichi Nishimura	Toru Sagara	
2014	Yuichi Nishimura	Toru Sagara	
2015	Yuichi Nishimura	Toru Sagara	
2016	Yuichi Nishimura	Toshiyuki Nagi	
2017	Yuichi Nishimura	Toru Sagara	
2018	Ryuji Sato	Hiroshi Yamauchi	
2019	Yuichi Nishimura	Shinji Ochi	
2020	Yuichi Nishimura	Yosuke Takebe	
2021	Jumpei Iida	Isao Nishihashi	
2022	Ryuji Sato	Takumi Takagi	
