= Ardiles =

Ardiles may refer to:

== Surname ==
- Osvaldo Ardiles (born 1952), Argentine football player, World Cup winner of 1978
- Hengky Ardiles (born 1981), Indonesian football player

== Given name ==
- Ardiles Rumbiak (born 1986), Indonesian football player
- Ardiles Joaquin dos Santos Neto, also known as Buiu (footballer, born 1980)
- Osvaldo Ardiles Haay (born 1997), Indonesian football player

== See also ==
- the Ardiles flick, also known as rainbow kick
