= 1998 J.League =

6th season of J1 League

J.League
- Season: 1998
- Champions: Kashima Antlers; 2nd J.League title
- Relegated: Consadole Sapporo
- Asian Club Championship: Kashima Antlers; Júbilo Iwata
- Matches: 306
- Goals: 1,074 (3.51 per match)
- Top goalscorer: Masashi Nakayama (36 goals)
- Highest attendance: 53,598 – Flügels vs. Marinos (September 15)
- Lowest attendance: 2,091 – Vissel vs. JEF Utd. (October 14)
- Average attendance: 11,982

The 1998 J.League season was the sixth season of the J.League. The league began in March 21 and ended in November 14. For this year, the division was contested by 18 teams. Júbilo Iwata won the first stage and Kashima Antlers won the second stage. Kashima Antlers won the J.League title after winning both matches in the Suntory Championship.

== Clubs ==
The following 18 clubs participated in J.League during the 1998 season. Of these clubs, Consadole Sapporo was the only newly promoted team from Japan Football League.

- Avispa Fukuoka
- Bellmare Hiratsuka
- Cerezo Osaka
- Consadole Sapporo
- Gamba Osaka
- JEF United Ichihara
- Júbilo Iwata
- Kashima Antlers
- Kashiwa Reysol
- Kyoto Purple Sanga
- Nagoya Grampus Eight
- Sanfrecce Hiroshima
- Shimizu S-Pulse
- Urawa Red Diamonds
- Verdy Kawasaki
- Vissel Kobe
- Yokohama Flügels
- Yokohama Marinos

=== Personnel ===
Club	Head coach
Avispa Fukuoka	(Japan) Takaji Mori
Bellmare Hiratsuka	(Japan) Shigeharu Ueki
Cerezo Osaka	(Japan) Yasutaro Matsuki
Consadole Sapporo	(Uruguay) Hugo Fernández
Gamba Osaka	(France) Frédéric Antonetti
JEF United Ichihara	(Netherlands) Jan Versleijen
Júbilo Iwata	(Brazil) Valmir Louruz
Kashima Antlers	(Brazil) Zé Mário
Kashiwa Reysol	(Japan) Akira Nishino
Kyoto Purple Sanga	(Japan) Hidehiko Shimizu
Nagoya Grampus Eight	(Japan) Koji Tanaka
Sanfrecce Hiroshima	(Scotland) Eddie Thomson
Shimizu S-Pulse	(Argentina) Osvaldo Ardiles
Urawa Red Diamonds	(Japan) Hiromi Hara
Verdy Kawasaki	(Japan) Ryoichi Kawakatsu
Vissel Kobe	(Japan) Harumi Kori
Yokohama Flügels	(Germany) Gert Engels
Yokohama Marinos	(Spain) Xabier Azkargorta

=== Foreign players ===
Club	Player 1	Player 2	Player 3	Player 4	Non-visa foreign	Former players
Avispa Fukuoka	(Brazil) Fernando	(Federal Republic of Yugoslavia) Dragan Đukanović	(Federal Republic of Yugoslavia) Miodrag Božović	(Paraguay) Juan Carlos Villamayor		(Brazil) Marcos Aurélio (Nigeria) Michael Obiku (Spain) Pablo Maqueda
Bellmare Hiratsuka	(Brazil) Cláudio	(Brazil) Ricardinho	(Romania) Pavel Badea	(South Korea) Hong Myung-bo		(South Korea) Park Kyung-hwan
Cerezo Osaka	(Brazil) Pericles	(Brazil) Pintado	(Federal Republic of Yugoslavia) Radivoje Manić	(South Korea) Hwang Sun-hong		(South Korea) Ha Seok-ju (South Korea) Ko Jeong-woon
Consadole Sapporo	(Argentina) Hugo Maradona	(Brazil) Pereira	(Brazil) Walter	(Panama) Jorge Dely Valdés	(Netherlands) Dido Havenaar	
Gamba Osaka	(Federal Republic of Yugoslavia) Anto Drobnjak	(Federal Republic of Yugoslavia) Nebojša Krupniković	(French Guiana) Claude Dambury	(Slovenia) Amir Karić		(Cameroon) Patrick Mboma (North Macedonia) Boban Babunski
JEF United Ichihara	(Australia) Matthew Bingley	(Federal Republic of Yugoslavia) Nenad Maslovar	(Netherlands) Arnold Scholten	(South Korea) Kim Dae-eui	(South Korea) Kim Hwang-jung	
Júbilo Iwata	(Brazil) Adilson Batista	(Brazil) Dedimar	(Brazil) Dunga			(Brazil) Alessandro Cambalhota
Kashima Antlers	(Brazil) Bismarck	(Brazil) Jorginho	(Brazil) Mazinho	(Brazil) Ricardo		
Kashiwa Reysol	(Brazil) Basílio	(Brazil) Bentinho	(Brazil) Buiú	(Bulgaria) Hristo Stoichkov		(Brazil) Duda (Brazil) Elpídio Silva (Brazil) Marcão
Kyoto Purple Sanga	(Brazil) Edmílson Matias	(Brazil) Junior	(Brazil) Paulo Silas		(South Korea) Park Kang-jo	
Nagoya Grampus Eight	(Brazil) Alexandre Torres	(Federal Republic of Yugoslavia) Dragan Stojković	(France) Bernard Allou	(Netherlands) Tarik Oulida	(Bolivia) Ko Ishikawa	(Brazil) Valdo
Sanfrecce Hiroshima	(Australia) Aurelio Vidmar	(Australia) Hayden Foxe	(Australia) Tony Popovic	(England) Don Goodman		(Australia) Graham Arnold (England) Ian Crook
Shimizu S-Pulse	(Argentina) Fernando Oliva	(Brazil) Fabinho	(Brazil) Santos		(Brazil) Alex	
Urawa Red Diamonds	(Federal Republic of Yugoslavia) Željko Petrović	(Italy) Giuseppe Zappella	(Spain) Txiki Begiristain			(Netherlands) Alfred Nijhuis
Verdy Kawasaki	(Brazil) Daniel da Silva	(Brazil) Fumagalli	(Brazil) Henrique	(Brazil) Moacir		(Brazil) Euller (Cameroon) Edwin Ifeanyi
Vissel Kobe	(South Korea) Ha Seok-ju	(South Korea) Kim Do-hoon	(Spain) Albert Tomàs		(Ghana) Michael Yano	(Australia) Matthew Bingley (Federal Republic of Yugoslavia) Budimir Vujačić
Yokohama Flügels	(Brazil) César Sampaio	(Portugal) Marco Ferreira	(Portugal) Paulo Futre	(Russia) Igor Lediakhov		(Brazil) Anderson Gils
Yokohama Marinos	(Bolivia) Julio César Baldivieso	(Federal Republic of Yugoslavia) Dušan Petković	(Spain) Jon Andoni Goikoetxea	(Spain) Julio Salinas		

== Standings ==
First stage

Pos	Team	Pld	W	OTW	PKW	OTL	PKL	L	GF	GA	GD	Pts
1	(Shizuoka Prefecture) Júbilo Iwata	17	13	0	0	0	0	4	52	18	+34	39
2	(Shizuoka Prefecture) Shimizu S-Pulse	17	13	0	0	0	0	4	32	14	+18	39
3	(Aichi Prefecture) Nagoya Grampus Eight	17	9	3	0	0	1	4	37	21	+16	33
4	(Kanagawa Prefecture) Yokohama Marinos	17	10	1	0	1	0	5	39	21	+18	32
5	(Ibaraki Prefecture) Kashima Antlers	17	10	1	0	0	0	6	41	28	+13	32
6	(Tokyo) Verdy Kawasaki	17	10	0	0	1	1	5	34	25	+9	30
7	(Saitama Prefecture) Urawa Red Diamonds	17	8	1	2	1	0	5	30	23	+7	28
8	(Kanagawa Prefecture) Yokohama Flügels	17	7	2	1	0	0	7	33	32	+1	26
9	(Osaka Prefecture) Cerezo Osaka	17	7	1	0	1	0	8	36	47	−11	23
10	(Chiba Prefecture) Kashiwa Reysol	17	6	1	2	1	0	7	32	35	−3	22
11	(Chiba Prefecture) JEF United Ichihara	17	7	0	0	2	0	8	31	31	0	21
12	(Kanagawa Prefecture) Bellmare Hiratsuka	17	5	2	1	1	0	8	27	34	−7	20
13	(Hiroshima Prefecture) Sanfrecce Hiroshima	17	5	2	0	2	1	7	22	33	−11	19
14	(Osaka Prefecture) Gamba Osaka	17	4	2	1	1	0	9	27	29	−2	17
15	(Kyoto Prefecture) Kyoto Purple Sanga	17	4	2	0	3	0	8	20	33	−13	16
16	(Hokkaido) Consadole Sapporo	17	3	1	0	2	3	8	28	44	−16	11
17	(Hyōgo Prefecture) Vissel Kobe	17	3	0	0	1	0	13	20	48	−28	9
18	(Fukuoka Prefecture) Avispa Fukuoka	17	2	0	1	2	2	10	22	47	−25	7

Source: RSSSF

Second stage

Pos	Team	Pld	W	OTW	PKW	OTL	PKL	L	GF	GA	GD	Pts
1	Kashima Antlers	17	12	3	0	0	0	2	38	15	+23	42
2	Júbilo Iwata	17	13	0	0	1	0	3	55	21	+34	39
3	Urawa Red Diamonds	17	11	0	0	2	0	4	32	17	+15	33
4	Yokohama Marinos	17	10	1	0	3	0	3	40	27	+13	32
5	Shimizu S-Pulse	17	8	3	1	0	1	4	39	21	+18	31
6	Nagoya Grampus Eight	17	9	1	1	1	0	5	34	26	+8	30
7	Yokohama Flügels	17	8	0	1	0	0	8	37	32	+5	25
8	Kashiwa Reysol	17	8	0	1	1	1	6	24	26	−2	25
9	Sanfrecce Hiroshima	17	7	1	1	1	1	6	23	19	+4	24
10	Consadole Sapporo	17	8	0	0	1	1	7	29	30	−1	24
11	Kyoto Purple Sanga	17	6	2	1	0	0	8	27	30	−3	23
12	Bellmare Hiratsuka	17	7	0	1	0	0	9	26	32	−6	22
13	Cerezo Osaka	17	7	0	0	0	1	9	20	32	−12	21
14	Vissel Kobe	17	5	0	1	1	0	10	25	41	−16	16
15	Avispa Fukuoka	17	4	1	0	0	0	12	11	38	−27	14
16	Gamba Osaka	17	3	2	0	0	1	11	20	32	−12	13
17	Verdy Kawasaki	17	3	0	0	1	1	12	13	28	−15	9
18	JEF United Ichihara	17	1	0	1	2	1	12	18	44	−26	4

Source: RSSSF

== Playoffs ==
=== Suntory Championship ===
November 21, 1998
14:04

Júbilo Iwata	1 – 2	Kashima Antlers
Nakayama 7'		Hasegawa 72'; Muroi 110'

Japan National Stadium, Tokyo
Attendance: 40,263
Referee: Masayoshi Okada

November 28, 1998
19:35

Kashima Antlers	2 – 1	Júbilo Iwata
Akita 39'; Bismarck 41'		Fujita 84'

Kashima Soccer Stadium, Kashima
Attendance: 16,991
Referee: Leslie Mottram

=== Relegation playoffs ===
On the aggregate table, JEF United Ichihara, Avispa Fukuoka, and Vissel Kobe had earned within the 15th-18th places in the tables for both 1997 and 1998, while Consadole Sapporo had achieved within the same span on its sole season on the J.League. (Gamba Osaka, who had finished between Sapporo and Kobe, was reprieved because of the collapse and resignation of Yokohama Flügels.) These clubs thus were entered in an elimination promotion/relegation tournament along with Japan Football League runners-up Kawasaki Frontale, who unlike champions Tokyo Gas had a base more qualifiable for the J.League.

==== First round ====
November 19, 1998	Avispa Fukuoka	3–2 (a.e.t.)	Kawasaki Frontale	Hakata no Mori Football Stadium, Fukuoka
	Kudo 24'; Yamashita 89'; Fernando 104'		Ito 17'; Tuto 61'	Attendance: 12,535; Referee: Alfredo Rodas

Kawasaki forms J.League Division 2 the next season. Fukuoka advances to the next round.

==== Second round ====
The winners of this round stay in J.League Division 1 and the losers play a final elimination series to determine the club relegated to Division 2.

November 22, 1998	Vissel Kobe	2–1	Consadole Sapporo	Kobe Universiade Memorial Stadium, Kobe
	Nagashima 34' (pen.); Kaimoto 41'		Tanada 50'	Attendance: 14,613

November 26, 1998; Time	Consadole Sapporo	0–2	Vissel Kobe	Muroran Irie Stadium, Muroran
			Tomàs 48'; Watada 89'	Attendance: 4,525; Referee: Alfredo Rodas

November 22, 1998	Avispa Fukuoka	0–2	JEF United Ichihara	Hakata no Mori Football Stadium, Fukuoka
			Takeda 65'; Scholten 76'	Attendance: 12,300; Referee: Leslie Mottram

November 26, 1998	JEF United Ichihara	2–1	Avispa Fukuoka	Ichihara Stadium, Ichihara
	Suzuki 49'; Sakai 60'		Mori 63'	Attendance: 10,703

==== Final round ====
December 2, 1998	Avispa Fukuoka	1–0	Consadole Sapporo	Hakata no Mori Football Stadium, Fukuoka
	Ueno 61'			Attendance: 12,526; Referee: Alfredo Rodas

December 5, 1998	Consadole Sapporo	0–3	Avispa Fukuoka	Muroran Irie Stadium, Muroran
			Ueno 52'; Fernando 84'; Ishimaru 89'	Attendance: 8,372; Referee: Leslie Mottram

Fukuoka stays in J.League Division 1. Consadole is relegated to new J.League Division 2.

== Awards ==
=== Individual awards ===
Award	Recipient	Club
Most Valuable Player	(Japan) Masashi Nakayama	Júbilo Iwata
Rookie of the Year	(Japan) Shinji Ono	Urawa Red Diamonds
Manager of the Year	(Argentina) Osvaldo Ardiles	Shimizu S-Pulse
Top Scorer	(Japan) Masashi Nakayama	Júbilo Iwata

Source: J.LEAGUE Digital Data Book

=== Best Eleven ===
Pos	Footballer	Club	Nationality
GK	Seigo Narazaki	Yokohama Flügels	Japan
DF	Makoto Tanaka	Júbilo Iwata	Japan
DF	Naoki Soma	Kashima Antlers	Japan
DF	Yutaka Akita	Kashima Antlers	Japan
MF	Dunga	Júbilo Iwata	Brazil
MF	Daisuke Oku	Júbilo Iwata	Japan
MF	Hiroshi Nanami	Júbilo Iwata	Japan
MF	Shinji Ono	Urawa Red Diamonds	Japan
MF	Toshiya Fujita	Júbilo Iwata	Japan
FW	Atsushi Yanagisawa	Kashima Antlers	Japan
FW	Masashi Nakayama	Júbilo Iwata	Japan

Source: J.LEAGUE Digital Data Book
