= Taiyo Koga =

Japanese footballer

Taiyo Koga 古賀 太陽
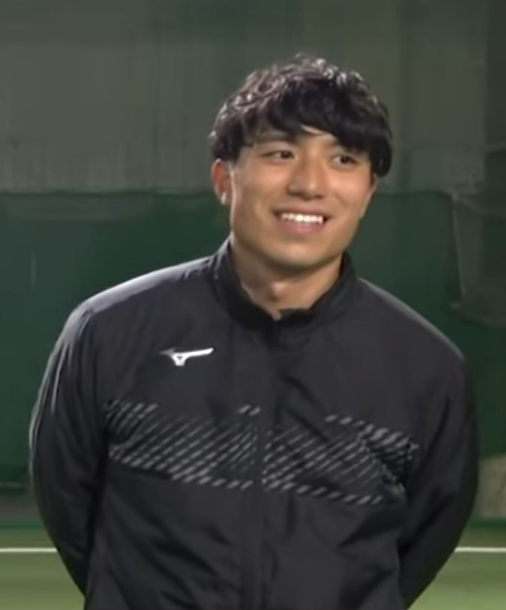

Personal information
- Full name: Taiyo Koga
- Date of birth: October 28, 1998 (age 28)
- Place of birth: Urayasu, Chiba, Japan
- Height: 1.82 m (5 ft 11 1/2 in)
- Position: Centre back

Team information
- Current team: Kashiwa Reysol
- Number: 4

Youth career
- –2007: Maihama FC Falcons
- 2008–2016: Kashiwa Reysol

Senior career*
Years	Team	Apps	(Gls)
2017–	Kashiwa Reysol	277	(4)
2018	→ Avispa Fukuoka (loan)	21	(0)

International career^{‡}
2021	Japan U23	2	(0)
2019–	Japan	3	(0)
- * Club domestic league appearances and goals as of 10 August 2026 ‡ National team caps and goals as of 23:21, 15 July 2025 (UTC)

Taiyo Koga (古賀 太陽, Koga Taiyō; born October 28, 1998) is a Japanese football player. He plays for Kashiwa Reysol and the Japan national team.

== Career ==
Taiyo Koga joined J1 League club Kashiwa Reysol in 2017.

== Club statistics ==
Updated to end of 2024 season.

Club	Season	League			Cup		League Cup		Continental		Total	
Club	Season	Division	Apps	Goals	Apps	Goals	Apps	Goals	Apps	Goals	Apps	Goals
Kashiwa Reysol	2017	J1 League	9	0	2	1	5	0	—		16	1
Kashiwa Reysol	2018	J1 League	0	0	0	0	0	0	2	0	2	0
Kashiwa Reysol	2019	J2 League	37	2	1	0	4	0	—		42	2
Kashiwa Reysol	2020	J1 League	33	0	—		5	0	—		38	0
Kashiwa Reysol	2021	J1 League	37	0	1	0	3	1	—		41	1
Kashiwa Reysol	2022	J1 League	32	0	3	0	2	0	—		37	0
Kashiwa Reysol	2023	J1 League	33	0	5	0	6	0	—		44	0
Kashiwa Reysol	2024	J1 League	37	1	3	0	1	0	—		41	1
Kashiwa Reysol	Total		218	3	15	1	26	1	2	0	261	5
Avispa Fukuoka (loan)	2018	J2 League	21	0	0	0	—		—		21	0
Career total			239	3	15	1	26	1	2	0	282	5

== National team statistics ==
Japan national team
Year	Apps	Goals
2019	1	0
2025	2	0
Total	3	0

== Honours ==
Japan

- EAFF Championship: 2025

Individual

- J.League Best XI: 2025
