= Fernando Henrique =

Fernando Henrique may refer to:

- Fernando Henrique Cardoso (born 1931), Brazilian politician, former president of Brazil
- Fernando Henrique (footballer, born 1983) (Fernando Henrique dos Anjos), Brazilian goalkeeper
- Fernando (footballer, born 1967) (Fernando Henrique Mariano), Brazilian footballer
- Nando (footballer, born 1990) (Fernando Henrique Quintela Cavalcante), Brazilian footballer
- Fernando Henrique (footballer, born 2001) (Fernando Henrique Pereira), Brazilian footballer
