= J.League Manager of the Year =

J.League Manager of the Year is an annual award given to one manager by the J.League based on their performance during the season. In the past, the award usually went to the manager of the champions, though this has varied somewhat over the years. From 2017, the award was modified so that the Manager of the J.League champion wins the J.League Champion Manager of the Year, and a separate J.League Manager of the Year award is given to a Manager from each of the J.Leagues (J1, J2 and J3). The list below reflects the award for J1 League Manager of the Year award only.

== Winners ==
Year	Manager	Club	Nationality
1993	Yasutaro Matsuki	Verdy Kawasaki	Japan
1994	Yasutaro Matsuki	Verdy Kawasaki	Japan
1995	Arsène Wenger	Nagoya Grampus Eight	France
1996	Nicanor	Kashiwa Reysol	Brazil
1997	João Carlos	Kashima Antlers	Brazil
1998	Osvaldo Ardiles	Shimizu S-Pulse	Argentina
1999	Steve Perryman	Shimizu S-Pulse	England
2000	Akira Nishino	Kashiwa Reysol	Japan
2001	Masakazu Suzuki	Júbilo Iwata	Japan
2002	Masakazu Suzuki	Júbilo Iwata	Japan
2003	Takeshi Okada	Yokohama F. Marinos	Japan
2004	Takeshi Okada	Yokohama F. Marinos	Japan
2005	Akira Nishino	Gamba Osaka	Japan
2006	Guido Buchwald	Urawa Red Diamonds	Germany
2007	Oswaldo de Oliveira	Kashima Antlers	Brazil
2008	Oswaldo de Oliveira	Kashima Antlers	Brazil
2009	Oswaldo de Oliveira	Kashima Antlers	Brazil
2010	Dragan Stojković	Nagoya Grampus	Serbia
2011	Nelsinho Baptista	Kashiwa Reysol	Brazil
2012	Hajime Moriyasu	Sanfrecce Hiroshima	Japan
2013	Hajime Moriyasu	Sanfrecce Hiroshima	Japan
2014	Kenta Hasegawa	Gamba Osaka	Japan
2015	Hajime Moriyasu	Sanfrecce Hiroshima	Japan
2016	Masatada Ishii	Kashima Antlers	Japan
2017	Yoon Jong-hwan	Cerezo Osaka	South Korea
2018	Mihailo Petrović	Hokkaido Consadole Sapporo	Serbia
2019	Tomohiro Katanosaka	Oita Trinita	Japan
2020	Tsuneyasu Miyamoto	Gamba Osaka	Japan
2021	Ricardo Rodríguez	Urawa Red Diamonds	Spain
2022	Michael Skibbe	Sanfrecce Hiroshima	Germany
2023	Shigetoshi Hasebe	Avispa Fukuoka	Japan
2024	Michael Skibbe	Sanfrecce Hiroshima	Germany
2025	Ricardo Rodríguez	Kashiwa Reysol	Spain

== Wins by club ==
#	Club	Winners
1	Kashima Antlers	5
2	Sanfrecce Hiroshima	4
2	Kashiwa Reysol	4
4	Gamba Osaka	3
5	Júbilo Iwata	2
5	Shimizu S-Pulse	2
5	Tokyo Verdy	2
5	Yokohama F. Marinos	2
5	Nagoya Grampus	2
5	Urawa Red Diamonds	2
11	Cerezo Osaka	1
11	Hokkaido Consadole Sapporo	1
11	Oita Trinita	1
11	Avispa Fukuoka	1

== See also ==
- J.League awards
