= Harumi Kori =

Japanese footballer and manager

Harumi Kori 郡 晴己
Personal information
- Full name: Harumi Kori
- Date of birth: August 17, 1953 (age 73)
- Place of birth: Japan

Youth career
- Years: Team
- Osaka University of Commerce

Managerial career
- 1985–1992: Kawasaki Steel
- 1993–1994: Kawasaki Steel
- 1998: Vissel Kobe
Medal record
Representing Japan
AFC U-19 Championship
Silver medal – second place	1973 Iran

Harumi Kori (郡 晴己, Kori Harumi; born August 17, 1953) is a former Japanese football player and manager.

== Coaching career ==
Kori was born on August 17, 1953. In 1985, he became a manager for Regional Leagues club Kawasaki Steel (later Vissel Kobe) based in Okayama Prefecture. The club won the champions in 1985 season and was promoted to Japan Soccer League first time in the club history. He managed the club until 1991–92 season. In 1993, he became a manager for Kawasaki Steel again and managed the club until 1994. In 1995, Kawasaki Steel was moved to Kobe and was changed the name to Vissel Kobe and was promoted J1 League from 1997. He also served as coach for the youth team. In October 1998, Vissel results were bad and manager Benito Floro was sacked. Kori became a manager as Floro successor. He managed 10 matches in regular season and relegation playoffs in 1998 season. In relegation playoffs, Vissel won the match against Consadole Sapporo and stay J1 League. He resigned end of the 1998 season.

== Managerial statistics ==
Team	From	To	Record				
Team	From	To	G	W	D	L	Win %
Vissel Kobe	1998	1998	10	6	0	4	60.00
Total			10	6	0	4	60.00
