= Oswaldo de Oliveira =

Brazilian football manager

Personal information
- Full name: Oswaldo de Oliveira Filho
- Date of birth: 5 December 1950 (age 75)
- Place of birth: Rio de Janeiro, Brazil

Managerial career
- Years: Team
- 1999–2000: Corinthians
- 2000: Vasco da Gama
- 2001–2002: Fluminense
- 2002–2003: São Paulo
- 2003: Flamengo
- 2004: Corinthians
- 2004: Vitória
- 2005: Santos
- 2005: Al-Ahli
- 2006: Fluminense
- 2006: Cruzeiro
- 2007–2011: Kashima Antlers
- 2012–2013: Botafogo
- 2014: Santos
- 2015: Palmeiras
- 2015: Flamengo
- 2016: Sport
- 2016: Corinthians
- 2017: Al-Arabi
- 2017–2018: Atlético Mineiro
- 2018–2019: Urawa Red Diamonds
- 2019: Fluminense

Oswaldo de Oliveira Filho (born 5 December 1950), known as Oswaldo de Oliveira, is a Brazilian football manager.

== Manager career ==
Born in Rio de Janeiro, Oswaldo de Oliveira became the first team coach for Corinthians in 1999 when Vanderlei Luxemburgo left the club to take the Brazil National Team manager role. Oliveira led the club to win the São Paulo State Championship and the Brazilian Série A that same year. In 2000, he made history by taking the first FIFA Club World Championship.

After leaving Corinthians, Oliveira would coach Brazilian teams Vasco, Fluminense, São Paulo, Flamengo, Vitória, Santos, Fluminense and Cruzeiro. The only title at this period would come with São Paulo, the 2002 São Paulo State Super Championship. After tricolor lost in Campeonato Brasileiro de 2002 against Santos, and lost the final of Campeonato Paulista de 2003 for Corinthians, Oliveira was dismissed because of bad results. He also had a short spell at Al-Ahli of Qatar.

In 2007 Oliveira started to coach J. League side Kashima Antlers. So far he has had a quite successful managerial career in Japan, winning three J. League Division 1 titles, one Emperor's Cup, one Japanese Super Cup. In 2009, he became the first J. League manager to be named J. League Manager of the Year three times. In 2012, Oliveira returned to managing in Brazil when he became the manager of Rio de Janeiro side Botafogo. In the 2013 season, he led Botafogo to 4th place in the league, qualifying the team for the Copa Libertadores. After the 2013 season, Oliveira was hired by fellow Brazilian side Santos FC. In 2015, he coached Palmeiras, which made him the first manager to have worked with all four main teams of São Paulo (Corinthians, Palmeiras, Santos and São Paulo) and four main teams of Rio de Janeiro (Botafogo, Flamengo, Fluminense and Vasco).

== Managerial statistics ==
As of match played 5 July 2025

Managerial record by team and tenure
Team	Nat	From	To	Record							
Team	Nat	From	To	G	W	D	L	GF	GA	GD	Win %
Corinthians	(Brazil)	1 January 1999	30 June 2000	121	62	22	37	244	173	+71	51.24
Vasco da Gama	(Brazil)	10 July 2000	18 December 2000	44	22	10	12	74	61	+13	50.00
Fluminense	(Brazil)	22 May 2001	22 April 2002	63	29	16	18	109	81	+28	46.03
São Paulo	(Brazil)	14 May 2002	4 May 2003	57	31	12	14	132	82	+50	54.39
Flamengo	(Brazil)	21 July 2003	12 October 2003	28	12	6	10	39	44	−5	42.86
Corinthians	(Brazil)	17 February 2004	24 May 2004	16	5	3	8	16	29	−13	31.25
Vitória	(Brazil)	1 July 2004	19 August 2004	14	3	4	7	17	27	−10	21.43
Santos	(Brazil)	1 January 2005	21 March 2005	16	9	4	3	38	23	+15	56.25
Al Ahli	(Qatar)	4 July 2005	28 February 2006	22	8	5	9	36	36	+0	36.36
Fluminense	(Brazil)	31 March 2006	7 August 2006	21	10	6	5	36	28	+8	47.62
Cruzeiro	(Brazil)	14 August 2006	31 December 2006	24	8	6	10	26	30	−4	33.33
Kashima Antlers	(Japan)	6 January 2007	31 December 2011	236	130	54	52	401	236	+165	55.08
Botafogo	(Brazil)	1 January 2012	31 December 2013	133	64	38	31	227	141	+86	48.12
Santos	(Brazil)	1 January 2014	2 September 2014	43	24	9	10	79	38	+41	55.81
Palmeiras	(Brazil)	1 January 2015	8 June 2015	29	15	7	7	44	23	+21	51.72
Flamengo	(Brazil)	20 August 2015	28 November 2015	18	8	3	7	24	21	+3	44.44
Sport Recife	(Brazil)	27 April 2016	12 October 2016	35	9	9	17	40	52	−12	25.71
Corinthians	(Brazil)	31 October 2017	31 December 2017	9	2	4	3	11	15	−4	22.22
Al Arabi	(Qatar)	20 January 2017	30 June 2017	10	4	2	4	14	19	−5	40.00
Atlético Mineiro	(Brazil)	26 September 2017	9 February 2018	20	8	9	3	32	22	+10	40.00
Urawa Red Diamonds	(Japan)	25 April 2018	28 May 2019	55	28	9	18	75	55	+20	50.91
Fluminense	(Brazil)	28 August 2019	27 September 2019	7	2	2	3	4	9	−5	28.57
Total				1,022	493	241	288	1,715	1,243	+472	48.24

== Honours ==
Corinthians

- Campeonato Paulista: 1999
- Campeonato Brasileiro Série A: 1999
- FIFA Club World Championship: 2000

São Paulo

- Campeonato Paulista: 2002

Kashima Antlers

- J. League Division 1: 2007, 2008, 2009
- Emperor's Cup: 2007, 2010
- J. League Cup: 2011
- Japanese Super Cup: 2009, 2010

Botafogo

- Campeonato Carioca: 2013

Urawa Red Diamonds

- Emperor's Cup: 2018

Individual

- J. League Manager of the Year: 2007, 2008, 2009

== See also ==
- List of football managers with the most matches
