= Nicanor de Carvalho =

Brazilian football manager (1947–2018)

Personal information
- Full name: Nicanor de Carvalho Júnior
- Date of birth: 9 February 1947
- Place of birth: Leme, Brazil
- Date of death: 28 November 2018 (aged 71)
- Position: Midfielder

Senior career*
Years	Team	Apps	(Gls)
1964–1966	Inter de Limeira		
1966–1968	XV de Piracicaba		
1968	Ponte Preta		
1969	São Paulo	14	(0)
1970–1973	Ferroviária		
1974–1975	Remo		
1976	Miami Toros		

Managerial career
- 1980: Corinthians
- 1984: Inter de Limeira
- 1984: Paulista
- 1985: Grêmio Maringá
- 1986: Atlético Paranaense
- 1986: Coritiba
- 1987: São José
- 1988–1989: Ponte Preta
- 1989: Santos
- 1990: Guarani
- 1991–1995: Bellmare Hiratsuka
- 1996–1997: Kashiwa Reysol
- 1998: Verdy Kawasaki
- 2001: América (SP)
- 2002: Botafogo (SP)
- 2003: Rio Branco (SP)
- * Club domestic league appearances and goals

Nicanor de Carvalho Júnior, sometimes simply known as Nicanor (9 February 1947 – 28 November 2018), was a Brazilian football player and manager.

== Playing career ==
Nicanor played mainly for clubs in the interior of São Paulo state. In 1969, he made 14 appearances for São Paulo FC. He also defended Remo and Miami Toros.

== Managerial career ==
Nicanor managed several Brazilian clubs during the 1980s and 1990s, including Guarani Futebol Clube. He died on 28 November 2018 at the age of 71.

== Managerial statistics ==
Team	From	To	Record				
Team	From	To	G	W	D	L	Win %
Kashiwa Reysol	1996	1997	62	38	0	24	61.29
Verdy Kawasaki	1998	1998	20	10	0	10	50.00
Total			82	48	0	34	58.54

== Honors ==
- J. League Manager of the Year - 1997
