= Ricardo Rodríguez (football manager) =

Spanish football manager (born 1974)

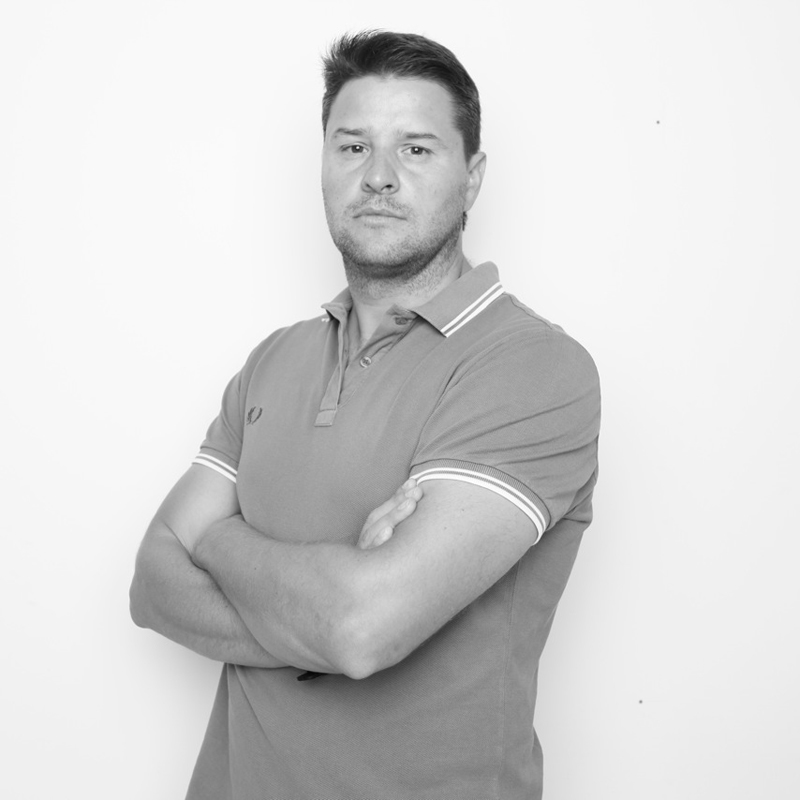
- Rodríguez in 2013

Personal information
- Full name: Ricardo Rodríguez Suárez
- Date of birth: 3 April 1974 (age 52)
- Place of birth: Oviedo, Spain

Team information
- Current team: Kashiwa Reysol (manager)

Youth career
- Years: Team
- Oviedo

Managerial career
- 2006–2007: Girona (youth)
- 2007: Girona
- 2007–2008: Málaga (assistant)
- 2011–2012: Saudi Arabia (assistant)
- 2013: Saudi Arabia U17
- 2013: Girona
- 2014: Ratchaburi
- 2014–2015: Bangkok Glass
- 2016: Suphanburi
- 2016–2020: Tokushima Vortis
- 2021–2022: Urawa Red Diamonds
- 2024: Wuhan Three Towns
- 2024–: Kashiwa Reysol

Ricardo Rodríguez Suárez (Spanish pronunciation: [riˈkaɾðo roˈðɾiɣeθ]; born 3 April 1974), is a Spanish football coach who is the manager of J1 League club Kashiwa Reysol. He was declared the best coach of the J1 League in the 2021 season, in which he won the Emperor's Cup with Urawa Red Diamonds. Also, he won the Japanese Super Cup in 2022.

== Education ==
Born in Oviedo, Asturias, Rodríguez was a Real Oviedo youth graduate, but a serious knee injury forced him to leave his footballing career. He has a bachelor's degree in Physical Activity and Sport Sciences from the University of A Coruña (1994–1998), and between 2000 and 2002 he obtained a PhD in Physical Activity and Sport Sciences at the University of Oviedo while studying a master's degree in Sports High Performance provided by the Spanish Olympic Committee at the same time.

From 2003 until 2006, Rodríguez completed the necessary studies to obtain the coaching badge from UEFA Pro License, provided by the Spanish Football Federation.

== Managerial career ==
Rodríguez started his career in 1998 at his former club Oviedo, being named the reserves' coach. In 2001, he was promoted to the main squad in Segunda División.

In 2003 Rodríguez worked as a director and manager of Real Madrid's youth school in México City, along with Alberto Gil and Xabier Azkargorta. He remained in charge for three years.

=== Girona ===
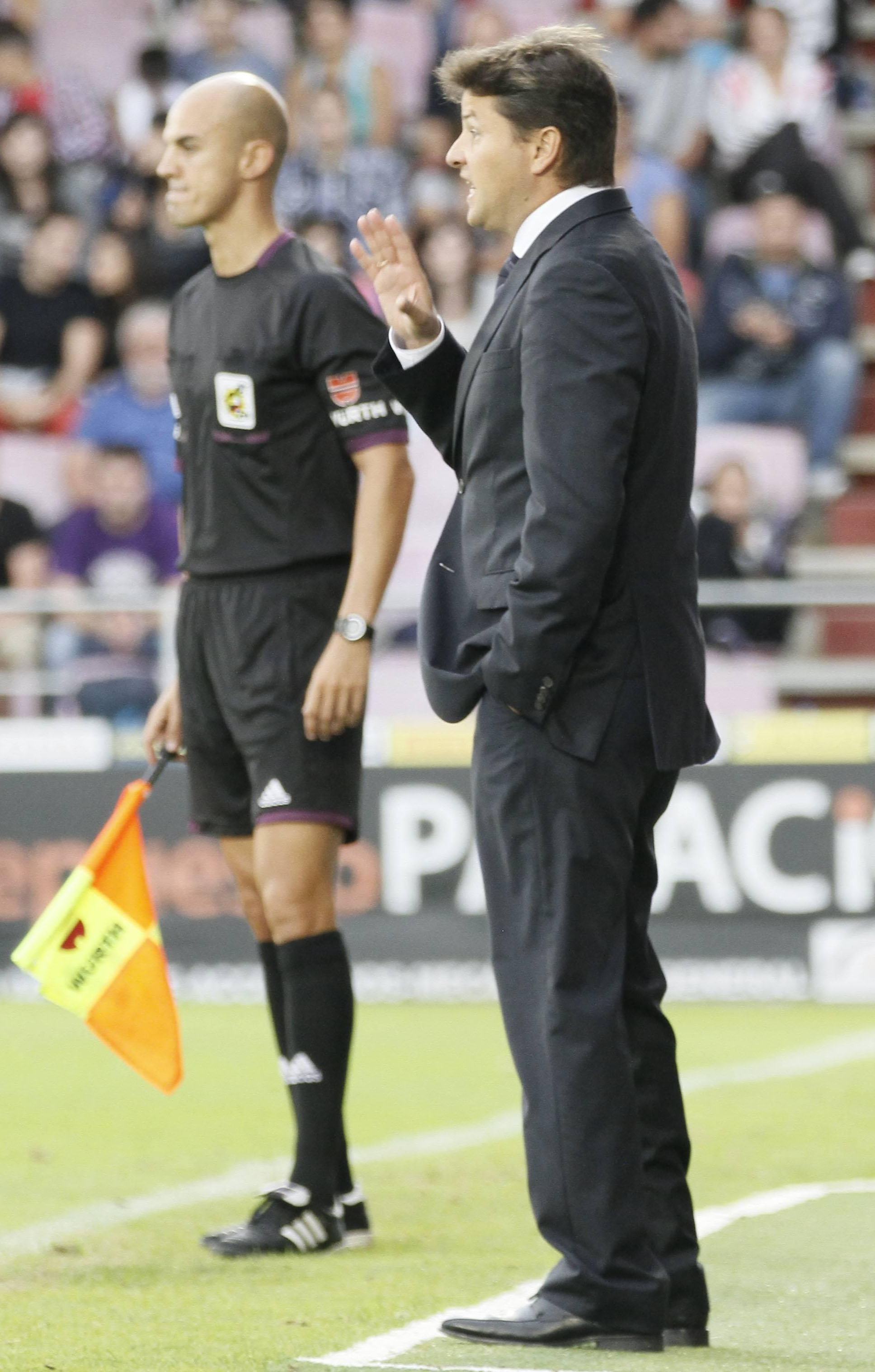
Rodríguez with Girona in 2013.

In 2006, Rodríguez returned to his home country, being appointed manager of Girona FC's Juvenil squad. On 6 February of the following year, he was named manager of the Catalans' first team in Tercera División (along with sporting director Javi Salamero), replacing fired Joan Carrillo, until the end of the campaign. He achieved promotion in the play-offs, after defeating Paco Jémez's RSD Alcalá.

=== Málaga ===
On 25 June 2007, Rodríguez was named at the helm of Málaga CF's B-team, but was shortly after appointed as Juan Muñiz's assistant at the main squad and being promoted to La Liga at the end of the season. In July 2008, he was appointed as director of football.

On 4 March 2010, Rodríguez left the Andalusians, with the club already promoted.

=== Saudi Arabia ===
In August 2011, Rodríguez signed a three-year deal with the Saudi Arabia Football Federation, initially as a consultant.

Rodríguez acted along with Juan Ramón López Caro and Frank Rijkaard, being added in the latter's squad in August 2012. In January 2013, after Rijkaard's dismissal, López Caro was appointed manager of the full squad and Rodríguez took charge of the under-17s.

=== Return to Girona ===
On 4 July 2013, Rodríguez returned to Girona, with his side now in Segunda División. He was relieved from his duties on 19 December, after a poor display in his last outings.

=== Thailand ===
On 19 January 2014, Rodríguez was named at the helm of Thai Premier League's Ratchaburi. Rodríguez finished his first season in Thailand with Ratchaburi by the fourth place in the final standing, highest position in the club history. In November, after the season's end, he left the club and signed for fellow league team Bangkok Glass shortly after. Rodríguez was sacked near the end of the 2015 season after 30 games of domestic league. In March 2016 he was appointed as manager of Suphanburi.

On 28 June 2016, Rodríguez has resigned from his position at Suphanburi after 3 months in charge.

=== Tokushima Vortis ===
In November 2016, Rodríguez signed with Japan's J2 League side Tokushima Vortis from 2017 season. Rodríguez is the first Spanish coach to win a trophy in Japan.

=== Urawa Red Diamonds ===
After successfully having guided Vortis to the first-ever J2 title, it was announced Rodríguez will join Urawa Red Diamonds for the 2021 season. At the end of his first season he was considered the most valued coach in the JLeague "for the impact on the club and the game changer of Urawa Reds" by recovering the competitive spirit of the team. At the end of the season, he was declared the best coach of the J1 League, and also he won the Emperor's Cup. Weeks later, Ricardo Rodríguez further strengthened his project at the helm of Urawa Red Diamonds by winning the Japanese Super Cup against the JLeague champions, Kawasaki Frontale, and became the first Spanish coach to win the Emperor's Cup and the Japanese Super Cup. At the end of the season 2022, Ricardo Rodríguez decided to call time on his successful tenure at Urawa Red Diamonds to embark on new professional challenges after leading the team to the AFC Champions League final and glory in the Emperor's Cup and the Japanese Super Cup.

== Managerial statistics ==
As of match played 24 October 2026

Managerial record by team and tenure
Team	Nat.	From	To	Record								Ref.
Team	Nat.	From	To	G	W	D	L	GF	GA	GD	Win %	Ref.
Girona	(Spain)	6 February 2007	28 June 2007	19	15	1	3	36	11	+25	78.95	
Girona	(Spain)	4 July 2013	19 December 2013	22	6	8	8	26	31	−5	27.27	
Ratchaburi Mitr Phol	(Thailand)	19 January 2014	2 November 2014	47	22	14	11	77	55	+22	46.81	
Bangkok Glass	(Thailand)	13 November 2014	24 November 2015	38	19	10	9	58	43	+15	50.00	
Suphanburi	(Thailand)	22 March 2016	28 June 2016	17	6	5	6	22	18	+4	35.29	
Tokushima Vortis	(Japan)	29 November 2016	28 December 2020	178	83	43	52	261	177	+84	46.63	
Urawa Red Diamonds	(Japan)	28 December 2020	30 October 2022	106	47	34	25	160	104	+56	44.34	
Wuhan Three Towns	(China)	5 January 2024	10 December 2024	30	8	6	16	33	47	−14	26.67	
Kashiwa Reysol	(Japan)	11 December 2024	Present	86	48	14	24	151	101	+50	55.81	
Career Total				543	254	135	154	824	587	+237	46.78	

== Honours ==
Tokushima Vortis

- J2 League: 2020

Urawa Red Diamonds

- Emperor's Cup: 2021
- Japanese Super Cup: 2022

Individual

- J.League Manager of the Year: 2021, 2025
