= Michael Skibbe =

German footballer and manager (born 1965)

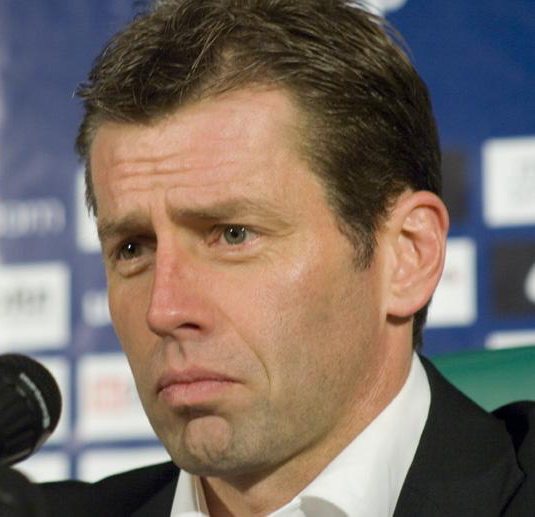
- Skibbe in 2007

Personal information
- Full name: Michael Heinz Skibbe
- Date of birth: 4 August 1965 (age 61)
- Place of birth: Gelsenkirchen, West Germany
- Height: 1.80 m (5 ft 11 in)
- Position: Midfielder

Team information
- Current team: Vissel Kobe (manager)

Youth career
- 1975–1982: SG Wattenscheid 09
- 1982–1984: Schalke 04

Senior career*
| Years | Team | Apps | (Gls) |
| 1984–1986 | Schalke 04 | 15 | (1) |
| Total | | 15 | (1) |

International career
| 1982–1983 | Germany U18 | 18 | (8) |

Managerial career
- 1987–1989: Schalke 04 U19
- 1994–1997: Borussia Dortmund U19
- 1997–1998: Borussia Dortmund II
- 1998–2000: Borussia Dortmund
- 2004–2005: Germany U18
- 2004–2005: Germany U20
- 2005–2008: Bayer Leverkusen
- 2008–2009: Galatasaray
- 2009–2011: Eintracht Frankfurt
- 2011: Eskişehirspor
- 2011–2012: Hertha BSC
- 2012: Karabükspor
- 2013–2015: Grasshoppers
- 2015: Eskişehirspor
- 2015–2018: Greece
- 2019–2020: Borussia Dortmund U19
- 2020–2021: Al-Ain
- 2022–2025: Sanfrecce Hiroshima
- 2026–: Vissel Kobe
- * Club domestic league appearances and goals

Michael Heinz Skibbe (born 4 August 1965) is a German former football player and current manager of J1 League club Vissel Kobe.

He was the 2022 and 2024 J.League Manager of the Year.

== Club career ==
In his youth, Skibbe played for SG Wattenscheid 09, then moved to the professional team of Schalke 04. From 1985 to 1986, he appeared in 14 Bundesliga games, but tore his cruciate ligament three times, which ended his playing career.

== Managerial career ==
=== 1988–2004: Early career ===
At the age of 22, he started his career as coach with Schalke 04 youth team.

In 1989, Skibbe became a youth coach for Borussia Dortmund. Skibbe became head coach of the reserve side on 1 July 1997, where he won the Oberliga Westfalen, and head coach of the senior team on 1 July 1998. Skibbe becoming the youngest head coach in the Bundesliga of all time at the age of 32. Skibbe was sacked on 6 February 2000. Skibbe finished with a record of 28 wins, 20 draws and 18 losses. Skibbe moved to the position of coordinator of the youth system of the club.

He gave up this post after being offered the position as director of the Germany national team. In 2000, he became its head coach. Rudi Völler, however, made most of the decisions, but did not have a coaching licence and thus couldn't be the official head coach. After Germany was eliminated in the first round of UEFA Euro 2004, Völler and Skibbe resigned from their positions. Skibbe was director of the youth system of the German Football Association from 24 August 2004 to 8 October 2005.

=== 2005–08: Return to club management ===
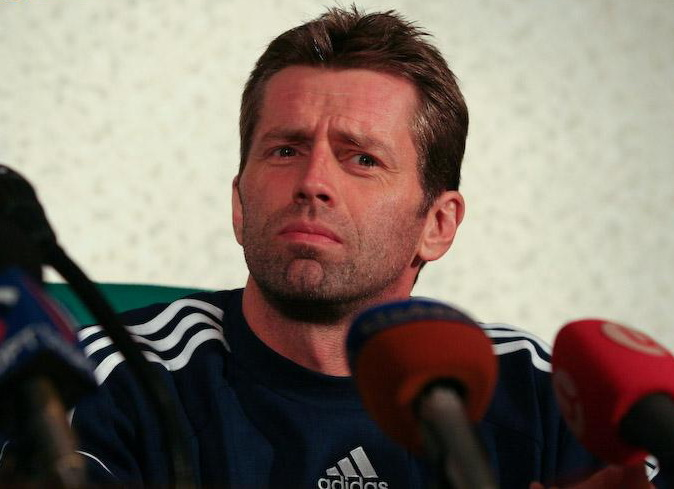
Skibbe with Bayer Leverkusen in 2007

Skibbe became head coach of Bayer Leverkusen on 8 October 2005. Skibbe was sacked from Bayer Leverkusen on 18 May 2008 after missing out on Europe. Skibbe finished with a record of 52 wins, 25 draws and 45 losses.

=== 2008–12: Going to Turkey and returning to the Bundesliga ===
On 11 June 2008 Skibbe agreed terms with the Turkish football club Galatasaray. He won the Turkish Super Cup after a 2–1 victory against Kayserispor. Galatasaray failed to qualify for the group stages of the UEFA Champions League after they lost 3–2 on aggregate to Steaua Bucuresti. Skibbe was sacked from Galatasaray on 23 February 2009, after a heavy 5–2 loss to Kocaelispor. Skibbe left Galatasaray fifth in the table, outside of a UEFA Champions League spot.

On 4 June 2009, Eintracht Frankfurt announced that Skibbe would succeed Friedhelm Funkel as head coach of the club. On 22 March 2011, after a decline in the Bundesliga, Skibbe was sacked by the club. Skibbe finished with a record of 25 wins, 15 draws, and 27 losses.

On 17 July 2011, Eskişehirspor announced that Skibbe would succeed Bülent Uygun as head coach of the club. On 27 December 2011, Skibbe's contract was dissolved to make way for his move to Hertha BSC. Skibbe finished with a record of nine wins, three draws and five losses.

Skibbe was officially released from Eskişehirspor to make way for his Hertha BSC move on 27 December 2011. After five losses in five games with the team, Skibbe was sacked from Hertha BSC on 12 February 2012.

=== 2012–15: Foreign club management positions ===
On 17 May 2012, he was formally introduced as the new manager of Karabükspor on a two-year contract. However, Skibbe left the club on 5 November 2012. Skibbe finished with a record of four wins, three draws and five losses.

On 15 June 2013, Skibbe was appointed as the new manager of Grasshoppers, succeeding Uli Forte. In January 2015, his contract was terminated by mutual consent. The club's management met thereby Skibbe's desire of realignment.

On 12 January 2015, it was reported that Skibbe had taken over Turkish Süper Lig side Eskişehirspor as the new manager. He had been coach of the club before in 2011 for six months.

=== 2015–2018: Greece ===
On 29 October 2015, the Hellenic Football Federation hired him as the new head coach of the national team. He was hired as the successor of Sergio Markarián due to the team's unsuccessful qualification for UEFA Euro 2016. Skibbe's first ever game as Greece coach was on 13 November 2015 against Luxembourg in Differdange which ended in a shocking start with the Greeks losing 1–0 to the very low ranked home side. His second game in charge was a very intense 0-0 derby draw against their biggest local-rivals Turkey in Istanbul on 17 November 2015. His next and third game in charge of the country was on 24 March 2016 where Skibbe enjoyed his first ever victory of the national team since taking over in a 2–1 home win over Montenegro at the Georgios Karaiskakis Stadium in Piraeus with goals from Giorgos Tzavellas and Nikos Karelis. His next challenge was the newly talented Iceland where the Greeks after leading 2-0 went on to lose the game 3–2 to the Icelanders in Piraeus on 29 March 2016. On 4 June 2016, Skibbe's Greek side began their 2-game tour of Australia by losing the first game 1–0 with a late Aussie winner from Matthew Leckie at Stadium Australia in Sydney.

On 7 June 2016, Skibbe enjoyed only his second win as Greece coach in an emphatic display as the Greeks took out a 2–1 victory with a good finish by Petros Mantalos and an amazing 60 metre-strike from Giannis Maniatis inside his own half which beat the scrambling Australia goalkeeper Adam Federici all the way to bounce into the net at Docklands Stadium in Melbourne. It was Greece's first victory over the Australians since 1978 when Greece were 1–0 victors over the Aussies in Adelaide. On 1 September 2016, he enjoyed a 2–1 away win over the Netherlands in an International friendly, the first ever Greek win on Dutch soil with goals from Kostas Mitroglou and Giannis Gianniotas. On 6 September 2016, Greece played against newly FIFA recognized minnow country Gibraltar who were appearing in their first FIFA competition game in their history and Skibbe's Greeks despite at one point the scores were level at 1–1, they went on to defeat the Gibraltarians 4–1 at Estádio Algarve in Faro/Loulé and get off the mark strong in their Round 1 2018 FIFA World Cup qualification group game. Greece have continued to be successful in their group, drawing 1–1 to a highly commendable Belgium squad on 25 March 2017.

Despite losing to the Belgians 1–2 at home some months later, subsequent positive results against Cyprus and Gibraltar helped Greece clinch a place in the World Cup qualification playoffs, being placed second to Belgium and just above Bosnia & Herzegovina. The team's playoff campaign against Croatia was rather disappointing due to a heavy 4–1 away defeat in the 1st leg at Maksimir Stadion, which also proved to be the aggregate score that got Greece eliminated, following a goalless draw in the return leg at Karaiskakis Stadium. Despite this outcome, the Hellenic Football Federation recognized Skibbe's contribution to restoring the national team's status within the footballing world after a devastating Euro 2016 qualifier campaign, and the increased cohesion and chemistry that he brought amongst the players during his reign. In fact, on 12 November 2017, Skibbe announced to the press that he would remain at the helm of Greece, something later confirmed by the Federation after the manager signed a two-year contract extension covering the UEFA Euro 2020 qualifiers. However, a poor showing in the first rounds of UEFA's newly formed Nations League competition, has prompted the Federation to consider sacking him. Skibbe's removal from his post as Greece manager was confirmed on 24 October 2018, with native experienced manager Angelos Anastasiadis expected to take charge for both the Nations League's two remaining games, and the Euro 2020 qualifiers.

=== 2020–2021: Al-Ain ===
Skibbe became manager of Al-Ain on 17 October 2020. Skibbe's first match was a 1–0 loss to Al Hilal. 28 January 2021, Skibbe was sacked by Al-Ain. At the time of his sacking, Al-Ain sat at the bottom of the table, six points from safety.

=== 2021–2025: Sanfrecce Hiroshima ===
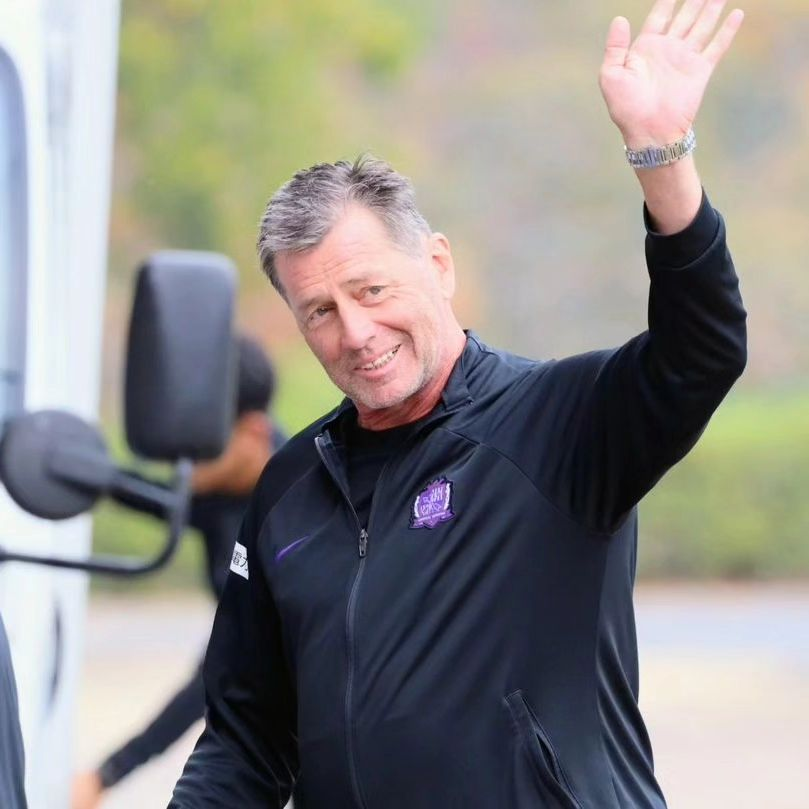
Skibbe with Sanfrecce Hiroshima in 2023

On 25 November 2021 he was appointed as manager of Sanfrecce Hiroshima. In 2022, he led the club to a 3rd place finish in the J1 League, a runner-up spot in the Emperor's Cup, and a J.League Cup title for the first time in club history. Skibbe was subsequently selected for the 2022 J.League Manager of the Year and 2024 J.League Manager of the Year award.

=== 2026–Present: Vissel Kobe ===
In 2026, Skibbe led Vissel Kobe to the J1 100 Year Vision League title in his first season with the club.

== Career statistics ==
=== Club ===
Appearances and goals by club, season and competition
| Club | Season | League | | | Cup | | Continental | | Total | |
| Club | Season | Division | Apps | Goals | Apps | Goals | Apps | Goals | Apps | Goals |
|---|---|---|---|---|---|---|---|---|---|---|
| Schalke 04 | 1984–85 | Bundesliga | 1 | 0 | 0 | 0 | — | | 1 | 0 |
| Schalke 04 | 1985–86 | Bundesliga | 14 | 0 | 0 | 0 | — | | 14 | 0 |
| Schalke 04 | Total | | 15 | 0 | 0 | 0 | — | | 15 | 0 |
| Career total | | | 15 | 0 | 0 | 0 | — | | 15 | 0 |

=== Managerial statistics ===
As of match played 20 April 2026

Managerial record by team and tenure
| Team | Nat. | From | To | Record | | | | | | | | Ref. |
| Team | Nat. | From | To | G | W | D | L | GF | GA | GD | Win % | Ref. |
|---|---|---|---|---|---|---|---|---|---|---|---|---|
| Borussia Dortmund II | (Germany) | 1 July 1997 | 30 June 1998 | 28 | 20 | 5 | 3 | 86 | 34 | +52 | 71.43 | |
| Borussia Dortmund | (Germany) | 1 July 1998 | 4 February 2000 | 66 | 28 | 20 | 18 | 86 | 63 | +23 | 42.42 | |
| Bayer Leverkusen | (Germany) | 9 October 2005 | 21 May 2008 | 122 | 52 | 25 | 45 | 204 | 162 | +42 | 42.62 | |
| Galatasaray | (Turkey) | 5 August 2008 | 26 February 2009 | 37 | 20 | 9 | 8 | 60 | 38 | +22 | 54.05 | |
| Eintracht Frankfurt | (Germany) | 1 July 2009 | 22 March 2011 | 67 | 25 | 15 | 27 | 93 | 102 | −9 | 37.31 | |
| Eskişehirspor | (Turkey) | 1 September 2011 | 26 December 2011 | 17 | 9 | 3 | 5 | 19 | 15 | +4 | 52.94 | |
| Hertha BSC | (Germany) | 27 December 2011 | 12 February 2012 | 5 | 0 | 0 | 5 | 1 | 12 | −11 | 0.00 | |
| Karabükspor | (Turkey) | 20 June 2012 | 5 November 2012 | 12 | 4 | 3 | 5 | 14 | 22 | −8 | 33.33 | |
| Grasshoppers | (Switzerland) | 1 July 2013 | 8 January 2015 | 69 | 31 | 14 | 24 | 111 | 90 | +21 | 44.93 | |
| Eskişehirspor | (Turkey) | 14 January 2015 | 10 October 2015 | 30 | 10 | 6 | 14 | 35 | 45 | −10 | 33.33 | |
| Greece | (Greece) | 30 October 2015 | 25 October 2018 | 27 | 11 | 6 | 10 | 30 | 26 | +4 | 40.74 | |
| Al-Ain | (Saudi Arabia) | 17 October 2020 | 28 January 2021 | 16 | 4 | 1 | 11 | 19 | 30 | −11 | 25.00 | |
| Sanfrecce Hiroshima | (Japan) | 1 January 2022 | 31 December 2025 | 205 | 115 | 39 | 51 | 365 | 209 | +156 | 56.10 | |
| Vissel Kobe | (Japan) | 1 January 2026 | Present | 17 | 10 | 4 | 3 | 31 | 17 | +14 | 58.82 | |
| Career Total | | | | 718 | 339 | 150 | 229 | 1,154 | 865 | +289 | 47.21 | |

== Honours ==
=== Club ===
Borussia Dortmund U19

- A-Junioren Bundesliga: 1994–95, 1995–96, 1996–97

Borussia Dortmund II

- Oberliga Westfalen: 1997–98

Galatasaray

- Turkish Super Cup: 2008

Sanfrecce Hiroshima

- J.League Cup: 2022, 2025
- Japanese Super Cup: 2025

Vissel Kobe

- J1 100 Year Vision League: 2026

=== Individual ===
- J.League Manager of the Year: 2022, 2024

=== Orders ===
- Bundesverdienstkreuz am Bande: 2002
