= Marcos Aurélio (footballer, born 1977) =

Brazilian footballer

Personal information
- Full name: Marcos Aurélio Fernandes da Silva
- Date of birth: 23 September 1977 (age 49)
- Place of birth: Franca, Brazil
- Height: 1.93 m (6 ft 4 in)
- Positions: Defensive midfielder; centre-back

Senior career*
Years	Team	Apps	(Gls)
1998	Mirassol		
1998	Avispa Fukuoka	3	(0)
1998	Botafogo (SP)		
1999	Portuguesa Santista		
2000	Náutico		
2001	XV Novembro de Jaú		
2002	Kawasaki Frontale	2	(0)
2002	Joinville		
2002	Palmeiras		
2003–2005	São Caetano		
2005	→ Cruzeiro (loan)		
2005	Fluminense		
2006	Tianjin Teda	16	(2)
2007–2009	Portuguesa	35	(4)
2008–2009	→ São Caetano (loan)	17	(3)
2009	→ Vitória (loan)	6	(0)
2010	Brasiliense	2	(0)
2010–2011	Bragantino	22	(2)
2011	Itumbiara	6	(0)
2012	Audax (SP)	0	(0)
2012	Botafogo (SP)	0	(0)
2012	Marília	2	(0)
2013	São José (SP)	0	(0)
- * Club domestic league appearances and goals

Marcos Aurélio Fernandes da Silva (born 23 September 1977), known as Marcos Aurélio, is a Brazilian former professional footballer who played as a defensive midfielder or centre-back.

== Biography ==
Marcos Aurélio was signed by Cruzeiro in 2005 for a reported R$50,000. However, he struggled to play regularly due to injury and had his contract terminated in August 2005. Later that month, he joined Fluminense on a four-month deal. In 2006, he moved to the Chinese Super League but unsuccessfully attempted to convert to a forward position.

Returning to Brazil in 2007, he signed a one-year contract with Portuguesa, which he renewed in January 2008, extending it until December 2010. In August 2008, he returned to São Caetano in one-year loan. He was released in April 2009 and transferred to Vitória for the rest of 2009 season. In January 2010, Brasiliense signed him definitely in a 1 1/2-year contract. He was released again in August and joined Bragantino for the rest of 2010 season. In January 2011, he was offered a new one-year extension. In June, he left for Itumbiara, again for the rest of 2011 season. He was released in September.

In 2012, he initially played for Audax-SP, then in February 2012 for Botafogo (SP) until end of the São Paulo state league.

In 2013, he left for São José Esporte Clube and scored twice.

== Career statistics ==
Appearances and goals by club, season and competition
Club	Season	League			National Cup		League Cup		Total	
Club	Season	Division	Apps	Goals	Apps	Goals	Apps	Goals	Apps	Goals
Avispa Fukuoka	1998	J1 League	3	0	0	0	0	0	3	0
Kawasaki Frontale	2002	J2 League	2	0	0	0	–		2	0
Total			5	0	0	0	0	0	5	0
