= Buiú (footballer, born 1980) =

Brazilian footballer

Personal information
- Full name: Aldieres Joaquim dos Santos Neto
- Date of birth: 5 May 1980 (age 46)
- Place of birth: Monte Aprazível, Brazil
- Height: 1.66 m (5 ft 5 1/2 in)
- Position: Midfielder

Youth career
- Mirassol

Senior career*
Years	Team	Apps	(Gls)
1998	Kashiwa Reysol	3	(0)
1999	Mirassol		
1999	Coritiba	4	(0)
- * Club domestic league appearances and goals

Aldieres Joaquim dos Santos Neto (born 5 May 1980), known as Buiú, is a former Brazilian football player.

== Club statistics ==
Club performance			League		Cup		League Cup		Total	
Season	Club	League	Apps	Goals	Apps	Goals	Apps	Goals	Apps	Goals
Japan			League		Emperor's Cup		J.League Cup		Total	
1998	Kashiwa Reysol	J1 League	3	0	0	0	0	0	3	0
Total			3	0	0	0	0	0	3	0
