= Kashiwa Reysol =

Japanese football club

- Full name: Kashiwa Reysol
- Nicknames: Reysol; Taiyō-Ō (Sun King); Aurinegro (gold-and-black)
- Short name: REY
- Founded: 1940; 86 years ago as Hitachi SC
- Stadium: Sankyo Frontier Kashiwa Stadium ("Hitachidai"); Kashiwa, Chiba
- Capacity: 15,900
- Owner: Hitachi
- Chairman: Ryuichiro Takikawa
- Manager: Ricardo Rodríguez
- League: J1 League
- 2026: J1 League, 15th of 20
- Website: www.reysol.co.jp
Home colours	Away colours

Kashiwa Reysol (柏レイソル, Kashiwa Reisoru) is a Japanese professional football club based in Kashiwa, Chiba Prefecture, part of the Greater Tokyo Area. The club currently plays in the J1 League, which is the top tier league in the country. Their home stadium is Sankyo Frontier Kashiwa Stadium, also known as "Hitachidai". Reysol is a portmanteau of the Spanish words Rey and Sol, meaning "Sun King". The name alludes to their parent company Hitachi, whose name means "rising sun" in Japanese.

The club was formed in 1940 and was a founding member ("Original Eight" (Note: The original clubs of the Japan Soccer League in 1965 were Mitsubishi Motors, Furukawa Electric, Hitachi, Yanmar Diesel, Toyo Kogyo, Yahata Steel, Toyota Industries and Nagoya Mutual Bank.)) of the Japan Soccer League (JSL) in 1965. Since the league's inception, they have spent the majority of their existence in the top tier of Japanese football. They have managed to win 1 J1 League title, 2 J2 League title, 3 Emperor's Cups, 2 J.League Cup and 1 Japanese Super Cup. The club also won the J.League Cup / Copa Sudamericana Championship in 2014. Internationally, Kashiwa has made an appearance in the FIFA Club World Cup with their only appearance coming in the 2011 edition.

== History ==
=== Hitachi SC (1939–1992) ===
The club started in 1939 and was officially formed as the company team, Hitachi, Ltd. Soccer Club in 1940 in Kodaira, Tokyo. The club formed the Japan Soccer League (JSL) in 1965, along with today's Urawa Reds, JEF United Chiba, Cerezo Osaka, Sanfrecce Hiroshima and three other clubs ("Original Eight"). They had some successes during the mid-1970s, winning Emperor's Cups and JSL titles and contributing several players to the Japanese national team.

The club relocated from Kodaira to Kashiwa in 1986, but it took a while to adapt to the new town, as they were relegated to the JSL Division 2 at end of the 1986. They made it back to the top flight in 1989–90, but dropped back in 1990–91 and returned again in 1991–92. As the J.League was formed while they were not strong enough, the club abandoned any attempt to once again be a founding member of the newly formed professional league. Instead, the club joined the Japan Football League Division 1 in 1992, the second tier of the Japanese football hierarchy at the time, below the J.League.

=== Kashiwa Reysol (1993–present) ===
The club changed its name to Kashiwa Reysol in 1993. Reysol added Brazil national team player Careca to their squad in the autumn of this year with the aim of winning the JFL champion and winning promotion to the J1 League. The club struggled in the 1993 season. However, with the help of Careca and Brazilian manager Zé Sérgio, they secured the 2nd place in the JFL in 1994, earning promotion to the top league. Reysol debuted in the J1 League in 1995. In 1998, they welcomed Akira Nishino, the former manager of Japan's olympic team as their new manager, along with Bulgarian national team player Hristo Stoichkov.

==== First major honours (1999) ====
In 1999, South Korean national team player, Hong Myung-bo was added to the squad. The team went on to win the J.League Cup in 1999 beating Kashima Antlers 5–4 on penalties to win their first ever major honours as Kashiwa Reysol.

However, their next manager, Englishman Steve Perryman, unsettled the team and the club struggled over the next several seasons. After finishing at the 16th place out of 18 clubs in 2005, the club lost the J.League promotion / relegation series against Ventforet Kofu, the 3rd placed team in the J2 League that year, and was relegated to the J2 League.

A new manager, Nobuhiro Ishizaki, led an almost entirely new squad in 2006 and the club secured automatic promotion to the J1 League in the last game of the season.

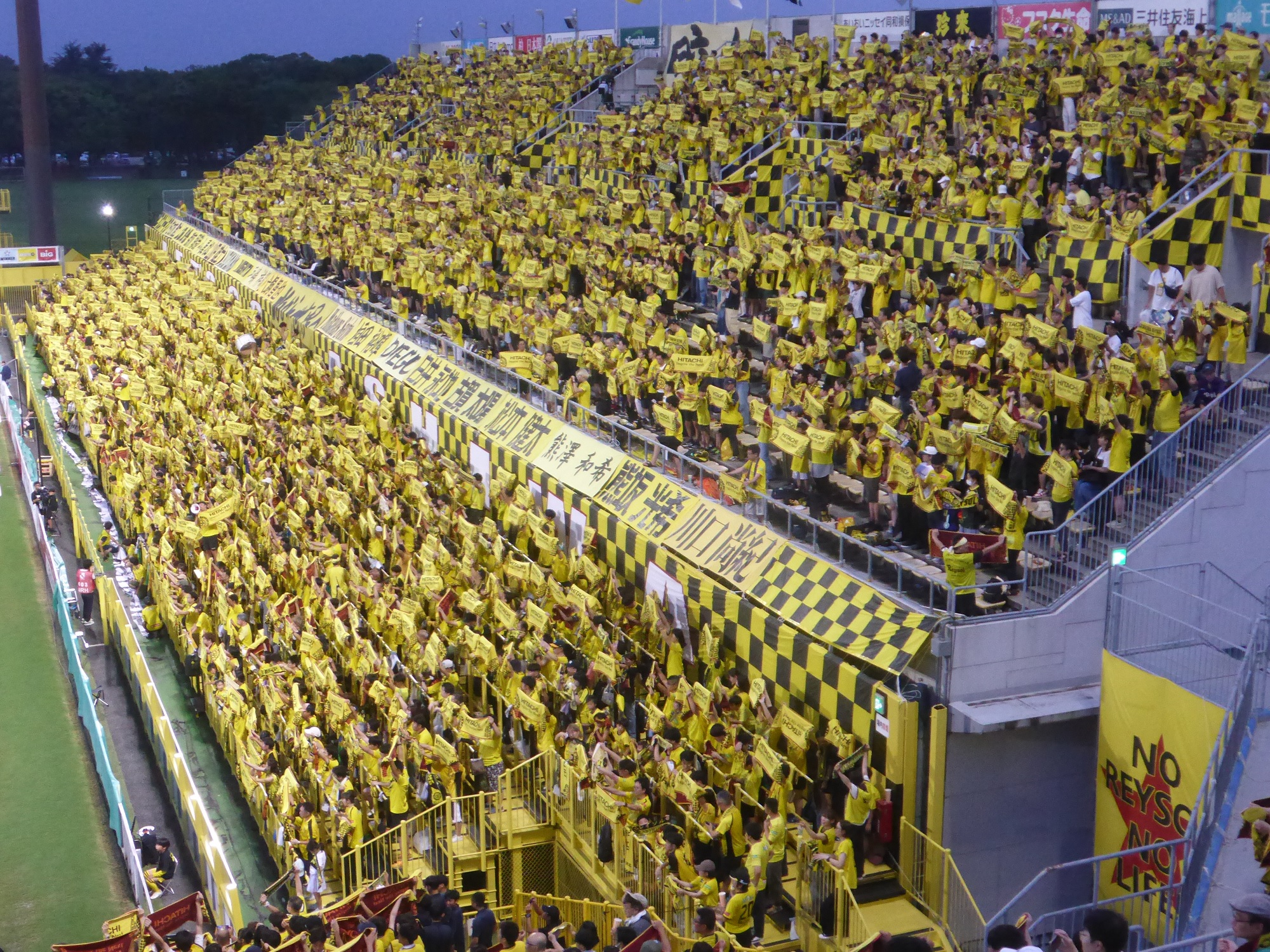
Reysol supporters at the ASankyo Frontier Kashiwa Stadium

==== Rise to prominence after relegation (2009–2014) ====
Kashiwa Reysol was relegated again at the end of the 2009 season after sitting in the relegation zone thus playing in the J2 League. However, in the 2010 season, Kashiwa Reysol won the J2 League led by Brazilian manager Nelsinho Baptista returned to the top flight after staying one season in the second division. Kashiwa Reysol then shockingly went on to win the J1 League on their first season back in the J1 League in the 2011 season with a squad stacked with talented footballers such as Hiroki Sakai, Junya Tanaka, Jorge Wagner and Leandro Domingues, and became the first Japanese club to win the second tier and the top tier back to back. (Note: Gamba Osaka achieved the same feat three seasons later; won the J2 League in 2013 and the J1 League back-to-back in 2014.) Kashiwa Reysol then qualified for the 2011 FIFA Club World Cup as the host nation's league champion where they went on to defeat 2010–11 OFC Champions League winner Auckland City and 2010–11 CONCACAF Champions League winner Monterrey before eventually losing to the 2011 Copa Libertadores winner Santos in the semi-final. The club then played their last match for third place against 2011 AFC Champions League winner Al Sadd but lost 5–3 on penalties.

==== AFC Champions League debut ====
In 2012, Kashiwa make their debut in the AFC Champions League where they were drawn in Group H alongside Thailand club Buriram United, Korean club Jeonbuk Hyundai Motors and Chinese club Guangzhou Evergrande. Kashiwa went on to finished with 10 points alongside Guangzhou Evergrande but advanced to the round of 16 as runners-up due to their head to head record. In the round of 16, Kashiwa faced another Korean club Ulsan Hyundai but eventually lost 3–2 thus going out from the competition. However, Kashiwa continued their strong form in 2012 by winning the Emperor's Cup, defeating Gamba Osaka in the final with Hirofumi Watanabe scoring the only goal in the match to seal the victory for Kashiwa Reysol where the victory also qualified the club for the 2013 AFC Champions League. Kashiwa also went on to win the 2012 Japanese Super Cup.

In 2013, Kashiwa had a good run in the AFC Champions League where they were drawn in Group H alongside Chinese club Guizhou Renhe, Australian club Central Coast Mariners and Korean club Suwon Samsung Bluewings. The club went on to top the group with 14 points thus advancing to the round of 16 where they would face another Korean club Jeonbuk Hyundai Motors where Kashiwa went on to win 5–2 on aggregate to advance to the quarter-finals against Saudi Arabian club Al Shabab. However, both leg resulted in a 3–3 draw on aggregate but fortunately sees Kashiwa advance to the semi-finals due to the away goals rule. In the semi-finals, Kashiwa faced Guangzhou Evergrande but the club was thrashed 8–1 on aggregate thus knocking out from the tournament. Kashiwa then went on to win the season by winning the 2013 J.League Cup. Kashiwa then went on the win the Suruga Bank Championship in 2014.

==== Relegation and return to the top flight (2018–2021) ====
In 2018, Kashiwa long stay in the top division came to an end when the club finished in the relegation zone in the 2018 season, resulting in relegation to the J2 League for the first time since 2010. Kashiwa responded strongly to relegation the following season. Under Brazilian manager Nelsinho Baptista, who returned to helms the club guided them to dominated the J2 League in the 2019 season. Kashiwa then won the league title and secured immediate promotion back to the J1 League.

The 2020 season marked the club's return to the top flight, where they finished in the upper half of the table, demonstrating a successful rebuilding process. The team's attacking style and reliance on young players helped establish stability following their promotion.

By the 2025 season, Kashiwa had re-emerged as one of the strongest sides in the league. Throughout the season, the club mounted a serious challenge for the league title and remained near the top of the standings for much of the campaign. The league titles race ultimately went down to the final matchday, with Kashiwa competing closely with Kashima Antlers. Although Kashiwa finished as runners-up after a narrow points difference, the season represented the club's strongest league performance since their historic title victory in 2011 and signaled a return to the continental tournament where the club qualified to the 2026–27 AFC Champions League Elite.

== Team image ==
=== Anthem ===
Kashiwa Reysol's anthem is 'We Are Reysol', which is sung by anime singer Hironobu Kageyama. The song released in 1994, the same year Reysol got promoted to J1.

=== Rivalries ===
==== Marunouchi Gosanke ====
Historically, Kashiwa Reysol's fiercest rivals have been JEF United Chiba and the Urawa Reds, both close neighbors. The three were co-founders of the Japan Soccer League (JSL) in 1965, and spent most seasons in the top tier through the JSL era. Because of their former parent companies' headquarters all being based in Marunouchi, Tokyo, the three clubs were known as the Marunouchi Gosanke (丸の内御三家, "Marunouchi Big Three") and fixtures among them were known as the Marunouchi derbies.

==== Chiba derby ====
Reysol and JEF United Chiba first met in 1941 in the ancient Kanto regional football league. The two clubs are both now based in Chiba Prefecture, and their rivalry is known as the Chiba derby. They play a pre-season friendly match every year, popularly known as the Chibagin Cup (i.e., Chiba Bank Cup) since 1995.

==== Others ====
Reysol also has a rivalry with Kashima Antlers (commonly called Tonegawa clásico), FC Tokyo (commonly called Kanamachi derby) and Omiya Ardija (commonly called Nodasen derby).

== Stadium ==
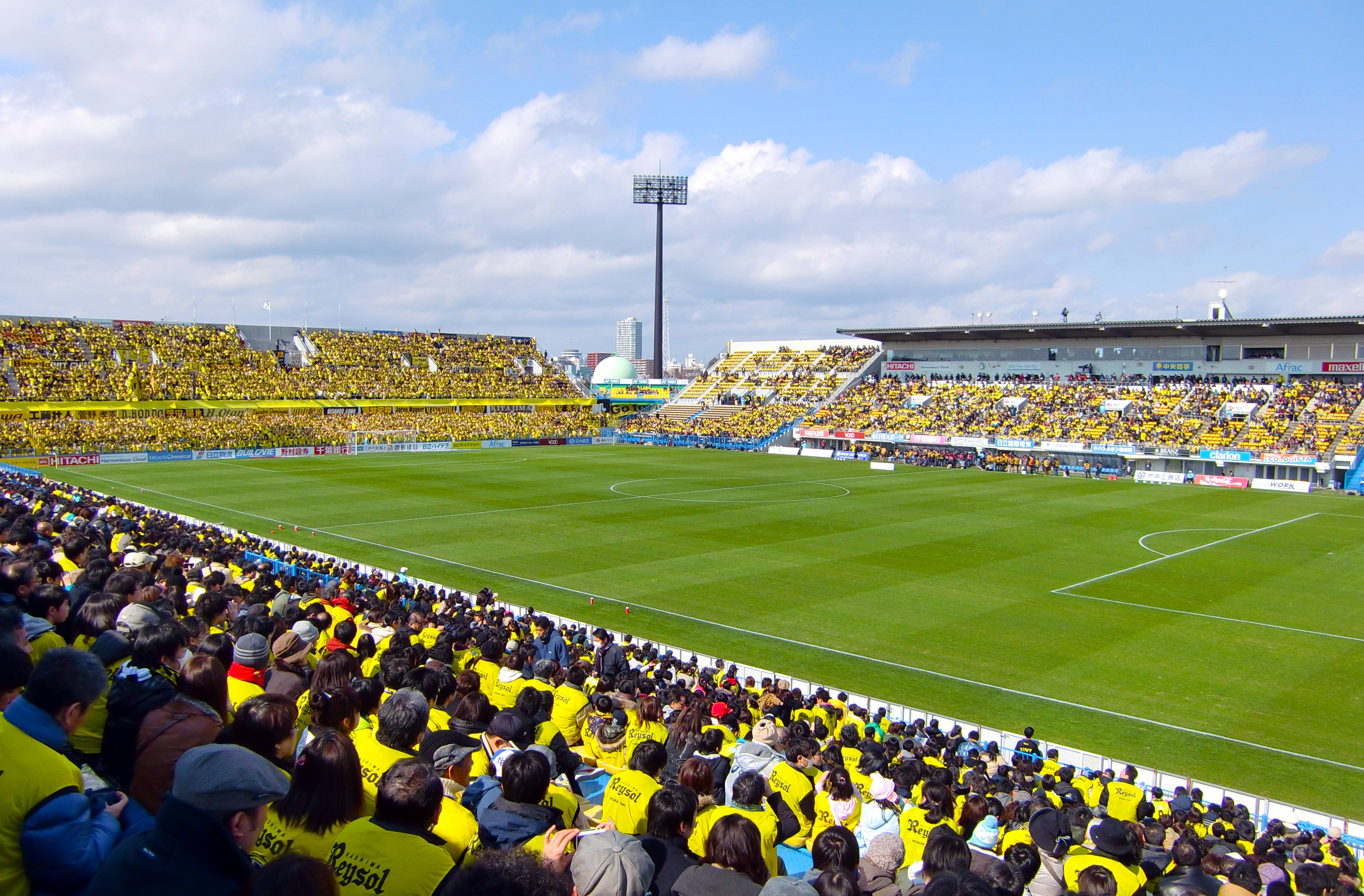
Sankyo Frontier Kashiwa Stadium

Sankyo Frontier Kashiwa Stadium is the home ground of Kashiwa Reysol. Located in the city of Kashiwa, the stadium has served as the club's primary venue since its opening in 1985. The stadium has a seating capacity of approximately 15,000 spectators and is known for its compact design, which places fans close to the pitch and creates an intense atmosphere during matches.

Originally opened as Hitachi Kashiwa Soccer Stadium, the venue was historically associated with the club's parent company Hitachi, which founded the team. Over the years, the stadium underwent several renovations to modernize its facilities and meet professional football standards. In 2018, the stadium's naming rights were acquired by Sankyo Frontier, leading to its current name.

The stadium is widely regarded as one of the most atmospheric venues in the J1 League due to its steep stands and proximity to the field. It has hosted numerous domestic league matches, cup fixtures, and continental games in the AFC Champions League.

== Kit suppliers and shirt sponsors ==
=== Sponsors ===
Year	Kit manufacturer	Main sponsor
1987–1993	(Germany) Adidas	(Japan) Hitachi
1994–1996	(Japan) Mizuno	(Japan) Hitachi
1997–2010	(England) Umbro	(Japan) Hitachi
2011–present	(Japan) Yonex	(Japan) Hitachi

=== Colours ===
Kashiwa Reysol's main colour is yellow, like sunshine that is based on the club's name "Sun King". The uniform is yellow-black (called Aurinegro in Spanish) reminiscent of Peñarol or Borussia Dortmund. Reysol is the only top division club in the country to wear yellow-black.

=== Kit evolution ===
Home Kits - 1st
1992 - 1994	1995 - 1996	1997 - 1998	1999 - 2000	2001 - 2002
2003 - 2004	2005 - 2006	2007 - 2008	2009 - 2010	2011 - 2012
2013 - 2014	2015 - 2016	2017 - 2018	2019 - 2020	2021 - 2022
2023 - 2024	2025 -			

Away Kit - 2nd
1992 - 1994	1995 - 1996	1997 - 1998	1999 - 2000	2001 - 2002
2003 - 2004	2005 - 2006	2007 - 2008	2009 - 2010	2011 - 2012
2013 - 2014	2015 - 2016	2017 - 2018	2019 - 2020	2021 - 2022
2023 - 2024	2025 -			

Other Kits - 3rd
2013; ACL 1st	2013; ACL 2nd	2015; ACL 1st	2015; ACL 2nd	2018; ACL 1st
2018; ACL 2nd	2022; 30th Anniversary	2025; LIMITED; Flare		

== Players ==
=== First-team squad ===
As of 2 October 2026.

Note: Flags indicate national team as defined under FIFA eligibility rules; some limited exceptions apply. Players may hold more than one non-FIFA nationality.

No.	Pos.	Nation	Player
1	GK	JPN	Haruki Saruta
2	DF	JPN	Hiromu Mitsumaru
3	DF	JPN	Shogo Asada
4	DF	JPN	Taiyo Koga (captain)
5	MF	JPN	Keita Endō
6	MF	JPN	Yuto Yamada
8	MF	JPN	Yoshio Koizumi
9	FW	JPN	Mao Hosoya
11	MF	JPN	Masaki Watai
13	DF	JPN	Tomoya Inukai
14	MF	JPN	Tomoaki Ōkubo
15	FW	JPN	Shōta Fujio
16	MF	JPN	Koya Yuruki
17	MF	JPN	Kohei Tezuka
18	FW	JPN	Yuki Kakita
19	MF	JPN	Hayato Nakama
20	MF	JPN	Yusuke Segawa
21	MF	JPN	Yudai Konishi
23	MF	JPN	Kaiji Chonan
24	MF	JPN	Tojiro Kubo
25	GK	JPN	Ryosuke Kojima (vice-captain)

No.	Pos.	Nation	Player
26	DF	JPN	Daiki Sugioka
27	MF	JPN	Koki Kumasaka
28	MF	JPN	Sachiro Toshima (vice-captain)
29	GK	JPN	Kengo Nagai
30	MF	JPN	Shusuke Furuya
32	DF	JPN	Yusei Yamanouchi
33	MF	JPN	Sota Iwanaga
39	MF	JPN	Nobuteru Nakagawa
40	MF	JPN	Riki Harakawa
42	DF	JPN	Wataru Harada
43	MF	JPN	Yuito Kamo ^{Type 2}
44	MF	JPN	Kenshin Yuba
45	DF	JPN	Raku Sato ^{Type 2}
46	GK	JPN	Kenta Matsumoto
51	FW	JPN	Makoto Mitsuta (on loan from Gamba Osaka)
56	DF	JPN	Kanade Tsuneto ^{DSP}
64	MF	JPN	Ryo Igarashi ^{Type 2}
77	GK	JPN	Tomoya Wakahara
87	MF	JPN	Hinata Yamauchi
88	DF	JPN	Seiya Baba

=== Out on loan ===
Note: Flags indicate national team as defined under FIFA eligibility rules; some limited exceptions apply. Players may hold more than one non-FIFA nationality.

No.	Pos.	Nation	Player
—	GK	JPN	Masato Sasaki (at Iwaki FC)
—	DF	JPN	Hayato Tanaka (at Tokushima Vortis)
—	DF	JPN	Taisei Kuwata (at Iwaki FC)
—	MF	JPN	Mohamad Sadiki Wade (at Giravanz Kitakyushu)
—	MF	JPN	Mohammad Farzan Sana (at Thespa Gunma)
—	MF	JPN	Rei Shimano (at Fujieda MYFC)

No.	Pos.	Nation	Player
—	MF	JPN	Shun Nakajima (at Iwaki FC)
—	MF	JPN	Takuya Shimamura (at Yokohama FC)
—	MF	JPN	Yoshikaze Tsunoda (at Fujieda MYFC)
—	FW	JPN	Nabel Yoshitaka Furusawa (at (Singapore) Tampines Rovers)
—	FW	JPN	Yōta Komi (at Cerezo Osaka)

=== Kashiwa Reysol U-18 ===
As of 29 April 2026

Below are list of U-18 team players belong to Kashiwa Reysol academy that competing in 2026 Prince Takamado U-18 Premier League, the top-flight league for U-18 team of football clubs and senior high school football teams in the country. Only registered players for the competition will be displayed.

Note: Flags indicate national team as defined under FIFA eligibility rules; some limited exceptions apply. Players may hold more than one non-FIFA nationality.

No.	Pos.	Nation	Player
1	GK	JPN	Genki Nishikawa
2	MF	JPN	Koa Adegawa
3	MF	JPN	Tatsuki Miyano
4	DF	JPN	Jukito Maruyama
5	DF	JPN	Haruto Yoshikawa
6	DF	JPN	Raku Sato
7	MF	JPN	Kaiji Chonan
8	DF	JPN	Kian Ueno
9	FW	JPN	Hyogo Makibuchi
10	FW	JPN	Yuito Kamo
11	FW	JPN	Shunnosuke Sugiyama
12	MF	JPN	Ao Kurosawa
13	MF	JPN	Hikaru Yoneda
14	FW	JPN	Ryo Igarashi
15	DF	JPN	Kanata Ochiai
16	GK	JPN	Haruma Kaneko
17	MF	JPN	Hayato Ohki
18	MF	JPN	Haruto Kishino
19	DF	JPN	Taro Otsuka
20	MF	JPN	Nagito Sumitani

No.	Pos.	Nation	Player
21	GK	JPN	Sosuke Oya
22	FW	JPN	Riku Inada
23	FW	JPN	Mirai Ohmura
24	MF	JPN	Takumi Suzuki
25	MF	JPN	Sota Sugawara
26	DF	JPN	Yusei Takahashi
27	MF	JPN	Masatake Honda
28	MF	JPN	Kengo Numahata
29	DF	JPN	Naoki Kashiwa
30	MF	JPN	Haru Kimbara
31	GK	JPN	Yujiro Yoshiguchi
32	DF	JPN	Sho Okumura
33	DF	JPN	Yukei Hohzawa
34	DF	JPN	Koe Toyama
35	DF	JPN	Amon Sadakiyo
36	FW	JPN	Yuto Chukwusomu Mogi
37	MF	JPN	Tao Sato
38	DF	JPN	Arata Shindo
39	FW	JPN	Juki Uetake
40	MF	JPN	Yumeto Kikuchi

== Management and staff ==
As of 2026.

Position	Name
Manager	(Spain) Ricardo Rodríguez
Assistant manager	(Japan) Ryoichi Kurisawa
Assistant manager	(Japan) Hidekazu Otani
Assistant manager	(Japan) Yuta Someya
Coaches & Physical coach	(Japan) Naoya Matsubara
Goalkeeping coach	(Japan) Keita Inoue
Technical	(Japan) Yasushi Okamura
Doctor	(Japan) Kojiro Hyodo
Medical	(Japan) Kaoru Arakawa (Japan) Hiroyuki Akai (Japan) Toshiya Itagaki (Japan) Hisao Iwaki (Brazil) Fabiano
Interpreter	(Japan) Isao Yakita (Japan) Masayoshi Edson Hayakawa (Japan) Michinori Katsuta
Scout and support coach	(South Korea) Lee Chang-won
Equipment	(Japan) Masafumi Kimura
Competent	(Japan) Takumi Miyamoto

== Honours ==
As both Hitachi SC (1939–1992) and Kashiwa Reysol (1993–present)

Type	Honours	Titles	Season
League	J1 League	1	2011
League	J2 League	2	2010, 2019
League	Japan Soccer League Division 1	1	1972
League	Japan Soccer League Division 2	1	1990–91
League	All Japan Works Football Championship	2	1958, 1960
League	All Japan Inter-City Football Championship	1	1963
Cup	Emperor's Cup	3	1972, 1975, 2012
Cup	J.League Cup	2	1999, 2013
Cup	Japanese Super Cup	1	2012
Cup	JSL Cup	1	1976
Regional	J.League Cup / Copa Sudamericana Championship	1	2014

== Records and statistics ==
As of 25 March 2026.

Top 10 all-time appearances
Rank	Player	Years	Club appearance
1	(Japan) Hidekazu Otani	2003–2022	610
2	(Japan) Takeshi Watanabe	1995–2004	341
3	(Japan) Yuta Minami	1998–2009	334
4	(Japan) Naoya Kondo	2002–2015	326
5	(Japan) Takanori Sugeno	2008–2015	324
6	(Japan) Taiyo Koga	2017–present	314
7	(Japan) Nozomu Kato	1992–2004	308
8	(Japan) Tomokazu Myojin	1996–2005	301
9	(Japan) Ryoichi Kurisawa	2008–2018	297
10	(Japan) Hideaki Kitajima	1997–2002, 2006–2012	272

Top 10 all-time goalscorer
Rank	Player	Club appearane	Total goals
1	(Brazil) Cristiano	250	94
2	(Japan) Masato Kudo	262	92
3	(Japan) Hideaki Kitajima	272	71
4	(Brazil) Edílson	92	65
5	(Brazil) Leandro Domingues	141	63
6	(Japan) Junya Tanaka	214	62
7	(Kenya) Michael Olunga	78	61
8	(Japan) Nozomu Kato	308	59
9	(Japan) Mao Hosoya	208	52
10	(Japan) Ataru Esaka	144	38

- Biggest wins: 13–1 vs Kyoto Sanga (24 November 2019)
- Heaviest defeats:
  - 0–7 vs Urawa Red Diamonds (4 April 1971)
  - 0–7 vs Urawa Red Diamonds (21 September 1996)
  - 0–7 vs Urawa Red Diamonds (15 October 2005)
- Youngest goal scorers: Mao Hosoya ~ 17 years 9 months 26 days old (On 3 July 2019 vs Iwate Grulla Morioka)
- Oldest goal scorers: Hidekazu Otani ~ 36 years 5 months 5 days old (On 11 April 2021 vs Gamba Osaka)
- Youngest ever debutant: Minoru Suganuma ~ 17 years 5 months 10 days old (On 26 October 2002 vs Vissel Kobe)
- Oldest ever player: Hidekazu Otani ~ 37 years 11 months 30 days old (On 5 November 2022 vs Shonan Bellmare)

== Award winners ==
As of the end of the 2025 season.

- J.League Player of the Year:

- (Brazil) Leandro Domingues (2011)
- (Kenya) Michael Olunga (2020)

- J.League Top Scorer:

- (Kenya) Michael Olunga (2020)

- J.League Best XI:
  - (South Korea) Hong Myung-bo (1999, 2000)
  - (Japan) Tomokazu Myojin (2000)
  - (Japan) Naoya Kondo (2011)
  - (Japan) Hiroki Sakai (2011)
  - (Brazil) Jorge Wagner (2011)
  - (Brazil) Leandro Domingues (2011, 2012)
  - (Japan) Kosuke Nakamura (2017)
  - (Kenya) Michael Olunga (2020)
  - (Brazil) Matheus Sávio (2024)
  - (Japan) Yoshio Koizumi (2025)
  - (Japan) Taiyo Koga (2025)
- J.League Best Young Player:

- (Japan) Hiroki Sakai (2011)
- (Japan) Yūta Nakayama (2017)
- (Japan) Mao Hosoya (2022)

- Individual Fair Play Award:
  - (Japan) Yuta Minami (2001)
  - (Japan) Masato Kudo (2014)
- J.League Manager of the Year:

- (Brazil) Nicanor (1997)
- (Japan) Akira Nishino (2000)
- (Brazil) Nelsinho Baptista (2011)
- (Spain) Ricardo Rodríguez (2025)

== Club captains ==
Captain	Period
(Japan) Takahiro Shimotaira	????–1998
(South Korea) Hong Myung-bo	1999
(Japan) Tomokazu Myojin	2000–2005
(Japan) Yuta Minami	2006–2007
(Japan) Hidekazu Otani	2008–2022
(Japan) Taiyo Koga	2023–present

== Managerial history ==
Manager	Period	Honours
(Japan) Tokue Suzuki	1 February 1965–31 January 1966	
(Japan) Masayoshi Miyazaki	1 February 1966–31 January 1967	
(Japan) Kotaro Hattori	1 February 1967–31 January 1970	
(Japan) Hidetoki Takahashi	1 February 1970–31 January 1977	– 1972 Japan Soccer League – 1972 Emperor's Cup – 1975 Emperor's Cup – 1976 JSL Cup
(Japan) Takato Ebisu	1 February 1977–31 January 1979	
(Japan) Mutsuhiko Nomura	1 February 1979–31 January 1982	– 1990–91 Japan Soccer League
(Japan) Yoshiki Nakamura	1 February 1982–31 January 1985	
(Japan) Yoshikazu Nagaoka	1 February 1985–30 June 1989	
(Japan) Hiroyuki Usui	1 July 1989–31 January 1993	
(Brazil) Zé Sérgio	1 February 1993–10 August 1995	
(Brazil) Antoninho	10 August 1995–31 January 1996	
(Brazil) Nicanor	1 February 1996–31 January 1998	
(Japan) Akira Nishino	1 February 1998–30 July 2001	
(England) Steve Perryman	1 August 2001–8 August 2002	
(Japan) Tomoyoshi Ikeya (caretaker)	9 August 2002–30 August 2002	
(Brazil) Marco Aurelio	31 August 2002–31 January 2004	
(Japan) Tomoyoshi Ikeya (caretaker) (2)	1 February 2004–31 July 2004	
(Japan) Hiroshi Hayano	1 August 2004–31 January 2006	
(Japan) Nobuhiro Ishizaki	1 February 2006–31 January 2009	
(Japan) Shinichiro Takahashi	1 February 2009–14 July 2009	
(Japan) Masami Ihara (caretaker)	15 July 2009–30 July 2009	
(Brazil) Nelsinho Baptista	1 August 2009–31 January 2015	– 2011 J1 League – 2012 Japanese Super Cup – 2013 J.League Cup – 2014 J.League Cup / Copa Sudamericana Championship
(Japan) Tatsuma Yoshida	1 February 2015–31 January 2016	
(Brazil) Milton Mendes	1 February 2016–12 March 2016	
(Japan) Takahiro Shimotaira	12 March 2016–13 May 2018	
(Japan) Nozomu Katō	14 May 2018–10 November 2018	
(Japan) Ken Iwase	10 November 2018–31 January 2019	
(Brazil) Nelsinho Baptista (2)	1 February 2019–17 May 2023	– 2019 J2 League
(Japan) Masami Ihara	17 May 2023–4 December 2024	
(Spain) Ricardo Rodríguez	11 December 2024–present	

== Season by season record ==
Champions	Runners-up	Third place	Promoted	Relegated

Season	Div.	Teams	Pos.	P	W (OTW / PKW)	D	L (OTL / PKL)	F	A	GD	Pts	Attendance/G	J.League Cup	Emperor's Cup	AFC	FIFA CWC
1995	J1	14	12th	52	21 (0 / 0)	–	29 (0 / 1)	18	30	–12	22	16,102	–	2nd round	Did not qualify	Did not qualify
1996	J1	16	5th	30	20	–	10	67	52	15	60	13,033	Semi-finals	4th round	Did not qualify	Did not qualify
1997	J1	17	7th	32	16 (2 / 0)	–	11 (1 / 2)	63	49	14	52	8,664	Quarter-finals	Quarter-finals	Did not qualify	Did not qualify
1998	J1	18	8th	34	14 (1 / 3)	–	13 (2 / 1)	56	61	–5	47	9,932	Group stage	4th round	Did not qualify	Did not qualify
1999	J1	16	3rd	30	17 (3 / -)	1	8 (1 / -)	49	36	13	58	10,122	Winners	Semi-finals	Did not qualify	Did not qualify
2000	J1	16	3rd	30	15 (6 / -)	1	7 (1 / -)	48	32	16	58	10,037	2nd round	4th round	Did not qualify	Did not qualify
2001	J1	16	6th	30	12 (2 / -)	3	11 (2 / -)	58	46	12	43	12,477	2nd round	3rd round	Did not qualify	Did not qualify
2002	J1	16	12th	30	9 (1 / -)	3	17	38	48	–10	32	11,314	Quarter-final	3rd round	Did not qualify	Did not qualify
2003	J1	16	12th	30	9	10	11	35	39	–4	37	10,873	Group stage	4th round	Did not qualify	Did not qualify
2004	J1	16	16th	30	5	10	15	29	49	–20	25	10,513	Group stage	4th Round	Did not qualify	Did not qualify
2005	J1	18	16th	34	8	11	15	39	54	–15	35	12,492	Group stage	5th round	Did not qualify	Did not qualify
2006	J2	13	2nd	48	27	7	14	84	60	24	88	8,328	Not eligible	4th Round	Did not qualify	Did not qualify
2007	J1	18	8th	34	14	8	12	43	36	7	50	12,967	Group stage	4th Round	Did not qualify	Did not qualify
2008	J1	18	11th	34	13	7	14	48	45	3	46	12,308	Group stage	Runners-up	Did not qualify	Did not qualify
2009	J1	18	16th	34	7	13	14	41	57	–16	34	11,738	Group stage	3rd round	Did not qualify	Did not qualify
2010	J2	19	1st	36	23	11	2	71	24	47	80	8,098	Not eligible	4th round	Did not qualify	Did not qualify
2011	J1	18	1st	34	23	3	8	65	42	23	72	11,917	1st round	4th round	Did not qualify	4th place
2012	J1	18	6th	34	15	7	12	57	52	5	52	13,768	Semi-finals	Winners	Round of 16	Did not qualify
2013	J1	18	10th	34	13	9	12	56	59	–3	48	12,553	Winners	4th round	Semi-finals	Did not qualify
2014	J1	18	4th	34	17	9	8	48	40	8	60	10,715	Semi-finals	3rd round	Did not qualify	Did not qualify
2015	J1	18	10th	34	12	9	13	46	43	3	45	10,918	Quarter-finals	Semi-finals	Quarter-finals	Did not qualify
2016	J1	18	8th	34	15	9	10	52	44	8	54	10,728	Group stage	4th round	Did not qualify	Did not qualify
2017	J1	18	4th	34	18	8	8	49	33	16	62	11,820	Group stage	Semi-finals	Did not qualify	Did not qualify
2018	J1	18	17th	34	12	3	19	47	54	–7	39	11,298	Semi-finals	3rd round	Group stage	Did not qualify
2019	J2	22	1st	42	25	9	8	85	33	52	84	9,471	Group stage	3rd round	Did not qualify	Did not qualify
2020 †	J1	18	7th	34	15	7	12	60	46	14	52	3,484	Runners-up	Did not qualify	Did not qualify	Did not qualify
2021 †	J1	20	15th	38	12	5	21	37	56	–19	41	4,444	Group stage	3rd round	Did not qualify	Did not qualify
2022	J1	18	7th	34	13	8	13	43	44	–1	47	8,499	Group stage	Round of 16	Did not qualify	Did not qualify
2023	J1	18	17th	34	6	15	13	33	47	−14	33	11,130	Group stage	Runners-up	Did not qualify	Did not qualify
2024	J1	20	17th	38	9	14	15	39	51	-12	41	12,070	Playoff round	Round of 16	Did not qualify	Did not qualify
2025	J1	20	2nd	38	21	12	5	60	34	26	75	13,017	Runners-up	2nd round	Did not qualify	Did not qualify
2026	J1	10	TBD	18									N/A	N/A		
2026-27	J1	20	TBD	38									TBD	TBD		

Key

- Pos. = Position in league; P = Games played; W = Games won; D = Games drawn; L = Games lost; F = Goals scored; A = Goals conceded; GD = Goals difference; Pts = Points gained
- OTW / PKW = Overtime wins / Penalty kicks wins 1997 & 1998 seasons - 1999, 2000, 2001 & 2002 Overtime wins only
- OTL / PKL = Overtime losses / Penalty kicks losses 1997 and 1998 seasons - 1999, 2000 & 2001 Overtime losses only
- Attendance/G = Average home league attendance
- † 2020 & 2021 seasons attendances reduced by COVID-19 worldwide pandemic
- Source: J.League Data Site

== Continental record ==
Season	Competition	Round	Club	Home	Away	Aggregate
2012	AFC Champions League	Group H	(Thailand) Buriram United	1–0	3–2	2nd
2012	AFC Champions League	Group H	(South Korea) Jeonbuk Hyundai Motors	5–1	0–2	2nd
2012	AFC Champions League	Group H	(China) Guangzhou Evergrande	0–0	3–1	2nd
2012	AFC Champions League	Round of 16	(South Korea) Ulsan Hyundai	3–2		
2013	AFC Champions League	Group H	(China) Guizhou Renhe	1–1	0–1	1st
2013	AFC Champions League	Group H	(Australia) Central Coast Mariners	3–1	0–3	1st
2013	AFC Champions League	Group H	(South Korea) Suwon Samsung Bluewings	0–0	2–6	1st
2013	AFC Champions League	Round of 16	(South Korea) Jeonbuk Hyundai Motors	2–5		
2013	AFC Champions League	Quarter-finals	(Saudi Arabia) Al-Shabab	1–1	2–2	3–3 (a)
2013	AFC Champions League	Semi-finals	(China) Guangzhou Evergrande	1–4	4–0	1–8
2015	AFC Champions League	Play-off round	(Thailand) Chonburi	3–2 (a.e.t.)		
2015	AFC Champions League	Group E	(South Korea) Jeonbuk Hyundai Motors	3–2	0–0	1st
2015	AFC Champions League	Group E	(Vietnam) Becamex Bình Dương	5–1	1–0	1st
2015	AFC Champions League	Group E	(China) Shandong Luneng	2–1	4–4	1st
2015	AFC Champions League	Round of 16	(South Korea) Suwon Samsung Bluewings	1–2	2–3	4–4 (a)
2015	AFC Champions League	Quarter-finals	(China) Guangzhou Evergrande	1–3	1–1	2–4
2018	AFC Champions League	Play-off round	(Thailand) Muangthong United	3–0		
2018	AFC Champions League	Group E	(South Korea) Jeonbuk Hyundai Motors	0–2	3–2	3rd
2018	AFC Champions League	Group E	(China) Tianjin Quanjian	1–1	3–2	3rd
2018	AFC Champions League	Group E	(Hong Kong) Kitchee	1–0	0–1	3rd
2026–27	AFC Champions League Elite	League stage	(South Korea) Jeonbuk Hyundai Motors	—N/a	1–2	
2026–27	AFC Champions League Elite	League stage	(Thailand) Port	5–1	—N/a	
2026–27	AFC Champions League Elite	League stage	(Thailand) Ratchaburi	—N/a	0–0	
2026–27	AFC Champions League Elite	League stage	(South Korea) Daejeon Hana Citizen	2–0	—N/a	
2026–27	AFC Champions League Elite	League stage	(Australia) Newcastle Jets	—N/a		
2026–27	AFC Champions League Elite	League stage	(Vietnam) Công An Hà Nội		—N/a	
2026–27	AFC Champions League Elite	League stage	(Thailand) Buriram United		—N/a	
2026–27	AFC Champions League Elite	League stage	(South Korea) Pohang Steelers	—N/a		

== League history ==
- Division 1 (JSL): 1965–1971 (as Hitachi SC)
- Division 1 (JSL Div. 1): 1972 to 1986–87
- Division 2 (JSL Div. 2): 1987–88 to 1988–89
- Division 1 (JSL Div. 1): 1989–90
- Division 2 (JSL Div. 2): 1990–91
- Division 1 (JSL Div. 1): 1991–92
- Division 2 (former JFL Div. 1): 1992–1993
- Division 2 (former JFL): 1994 (as Kashiwa Reysol)
- Division 1 (J.League): 1995–1998
- Division 1 (J1): 1999–2005
- Division 2 (J2): 2006
- Division 1 (J1): 2007–2009
- Division 2 (J2): 2010
- Division 1 (J1): 2011–2018
- Division 2 (J2): 2019
- Division 1 (J1): 2020–present
