= Masakazu Suzuki =

Japanese footballer and manager

Masakazu Suzuki 鈴木 政一
Personal information
- Full name: Masakazu Suzuki
- Date of birth: January 1, 1955 (age 71)
- Place of birth: Yamanashi, Japan
- Position: Defender

Youth career
- 1970–1972: Isawa High School

College career
Years	Team	Apps	(Gls)
1973–1976	Nippon Sport Science University		

Senior career*
Years	Team	Apps	(Gls)
1977–1982	Yamaha Motors		

Managerial career
- 2000–2002: Júbilo Iwata
- 2004: Júbilo Iwata
- 2013–2014: Japan U-20
- 2018: Albirex Niigata
- 2020–2021: Júbilo Iwata
Medal record
Yamaha Motors
Winner	Emperor's Cup	1982
- * Club domestic league appearances and goals

Masakazu Suzuki (鈴木 政一, Suzuki Masakazu; born January 1, 1955) is a former Japanese football player and manager who is currently the assistant coach of the Myanmar national football team.

== Playing career ==
Suzuki was born in Yamanashi Prefecture on January 1, 1955. After graduating from Nippon Sport Science University, he played for Yamaha Motors (later Júbilo Iwata) from 1977 to 1982.

== Coaching career ==
After retirement, Suzuki started his coaching career at Yamaha Motors in 1984. In 2000, he was promoted to manager the successor to Gjoko Hadžievski. In 2002, he led to the team to the championship, after which he stepped down. He briefly returned to manager the team from September to November of 2004. In 2013, he became a manager for the Japan U-20 national team. In 2018, he signed with J2 League club Albirex Niigata. He was fired in August at the end of the season, as the team had performed poorly, placing 19th out of 22 teams.

== Managerial statistics ==
Team	From	To	Record				
Team	From	To	G	W	D	L	Win %
Júbilo Iwata	2000	2002	65	56	2	7	86.15
Júbilo Iwata	2004	2004	8	3	4	1	37.50
Albirex Niigata	2018	2018	27	8	5	14	29.63
Total			100	67	11	22	67.00

== Honours ==
=== Manager ===
Júbilo Iwata

- J1 League: 2002

Individual

- J.League Manager of the Year: 2001, 2002
