= 2010 Júbilo Iwata season =

Júbilo Iwata
2010 season
- Manager: Masaaki Yanagishita
- Stadium: Yamaha Stadium
- J. League 1: 11th
- Emperor's Cup: 4th Round
- J. League Cup: Champions
- Top goalscorer: Ryoichi Maeda (17)

2010 Júbilo Iwata season

== Competitions ==
Competitions	Position
J. League 1	11th / 18 clubs
Emperor's Cup	4th Round
J. League Cup	Champions

=== J. League 1 ===
Pos	Team	Pld	W	D	L	GF	GA	GD	Pts
9	Albirex Niigata	34	12	13	9	48	45	+3	49
10	Urawa Red Diamonds	34	14	6	14	48	41	+7	48
11	Júbilo Iwata	34	11	11	12	38	49	−11	44
12	Omiya Ardija	34	11	9	14	39	45	−6	42
13	Montedio Yamagata	34	11	9	14	29	42	−13	42

Updated to match(es) played on December 4, 2010. Source: J.League Division 1
Rules for classification: 1) points; 2) goal difference; 3) number of goals scored.

== Player statistics ==
No.	Pos.	Player	D.o.B. (Age)	Height / Weight	J. League 1		Emperor's Cup		J. League Cup		Total	
No.	Pos.	Player	D.o.B. (Age)	Height / Weight	Apps	Goals	Apps	Goals	Apps	Goals	Apps	Goals
1	GK	Yoshikatsu Kawaguchi	August 15, 1975 (aged 34)	cm / kg	17	0						
2	DF	Kenichi Kaga	September 30, 1983 (aged 26)	cm / kg	12	0						
3	MF	Ryu Okada	April 10, 1984 (aged 25)	cm / kg	8	0						
4	DF	Kentaro Ohi	May 14, 1984 (aged 25)	cm / kg	15	0						
5	DF	Yūichi Komano	July 25, 1981 (aged 28)	cm / kg	23	0						
6	MF	Daisuke Nasu	October 10, 1981 (aged 28)	cm / kg	33	3						
8	FW	Gilsinho	April 4, 1984 (aged 25)	cm / kg	21	6						
10	MF	Sho Naruoka	May 31, 1984 (aged 25)	cm / kg	33	3						
11	MF	Norihiro Nishi	May 9, 1980 (aged 29)	cm / kg	31	3						
13	DF	Lee Gang-Jin	April 25, 1986 (aged 23)	cm / kg	28	0						
14	DF	Park Joo-Ho	January 16, 1987 (aged 23)	cm / kg	23	2						
15	MF	Minoru Suganuma	May 16, 1985 (aged 24)	cm / kg	18	0						
16	DF	Jo Kanazawa	July 9, 1976 (aged 33)	cm / kg	14	0						
17	MF	Yusuke Inuzuka	December 13, 1983 (aged 26)	cm / kg	0	0						
18	FW	Ryoichi Maeda	October 9, 1981 (aged 28)	cm / kg	33	17						
19	FW	Tomoyuki Arata	October 3, 1985 (aged 24)	cm / kg	13	0						
20	MF	Shuto Yamamoto	June 1, 1985 (aged 24)	cm / kg	11	0						
21	GK	Naoki Hatta	June 24, 1986 (aged 23)	cm / kg	18	0						
22	FW	Robert Cullen	June 7, 1985 (aged 24)	cm / kg	1	0						
23	MF	Kosuke Yamamoto	October 29, 1989 (aged 20)	cm / kg	30	1						
24	MF	Takuya Matsuura	December 21, 1988 (aged 21)	cm / kg	10	0						
25	FW	Ryohei Yamazaki	March 14, 1989 (aged 20)	cm / kg	4	0						
27	MF	Kota Ueda	May 9, 1986 (aged 23)	cm / kg	26	1						
28	MF	Keisuke Funatani	January 7, 1986 (aged 24)	cm / kg	25	0						
30	DF	Shinnosuke Honda	June 23, 1990 (aged 19)	cm / kg	0	0						
31	GK	Akihiko Takeshige	August 21, 1987 (aged 22)	cm / kg	0	0						
32	GK	Takuya Ohata	May 28, 1990 (aged 19)	cm / kg	0	0						
33	FW	Lee Keun-Ho	April 11, 1985 (aged 24)	cm / kg	12	1						
34	FW	Hwang Song-Su	July 10, 1987 (aged 22)	cm / kg	0	0						
50	DF	Masahiro Koga	September 8, 1978 (aged 31)	cm / kg	12	0						

== Other pages ==
- (in Japanese) J. League official site
