= 2011 Júbilo Iwata season =

Júbilo Iwata
2011 season
- Manager: Masaaki Yanagishita
- J.League: 8th
- Emperor's Cup: Third round
- J.League Cup: Quarter-finals
- Top goalscorer: League: Ryoichi Maeda (14); All: Ryoichi Maeda (15)
Home colours	Away colours

The 2011 Júbilo Iwata season was Júbilo Iwata's 18th consecutive season in J.League Division 1 and 29th overall in the Japanese top flight. It also included the 2011 J.League Cup, and the 2011 Emperor's Cup.

== Players ==
Note: Flags indicate national team as defined under FIFA eligibility rules; some limited exceptions apply. Players may hold more than one non-FIFA nationality.

No.	Pos.	Nation	Player
1	GK	JPN	Yoshikatsu Kawaguchi
2	DF	JPN	Kenichi Kaga
3	DF	JPN	Ryu Okada
5	MF	JPN	Yuichi Komano
6	MF	JPN	Daisuke Nasu
8	FW	BRA	Gilsinho
10	MF	JPN	Hiroki Yamada
11	MF	JPN	Norihiro Nishi
13	DF	KOR	Lee Gang-Jin
15	MF	JPN	Minoru Suganuma
16	DF	JPN	Jo Kanazawa
17	FW	JPN	Hidetaka Kanazono
18	FW	JPN	Ryoichi Maeda
19	FW	JPN	Tomoyuki Arata

No.	Pos.	Nation	Player
20	MF	JPN	Shuto Yamamoto
21	GK	JPN	Naoki Hatta
22	MF	JPN	Yuki Kobayashi
23	MF	JPN	Kosuke Yamamoto
25	FW	JPN	Ryohei Yamazaki
28	MF	JPN	Keisuke Funatani
30	DF	JPN	Shinnosuke Honda
31	GK	JPN	Akihiko Takeshige
32	GK	JPN	Kei Uemura
33	DF	JPN	Yoshiaki Fujita
34	FW	PRK	Hwang Song-Su
49	MF	BRA	Rodrigo Souto
50	DF	JPN	Masahiro Koga

=== Out on loan ===
Note: Flags indicate national team as defined under FIFA eligibility rules; some limited exceptions apply. Players may hold more than one non-FIFA nationality.

No.	Pos.	Nation	Player
—	DF	JPN	Kentaro Ohi (to Shonan Bellmare)
—	MF	JPN	Takuya Matsuura (to Avispa Fukuoka)

No.	Pos.	Nation	Player
—	FW	JPN	Yuki Oshitani (to F.C. Gifu)

== Transfers ==
=== Winter ===
In: Note: Flags indicate national team as defined under FIFA eligibility rules; some limited exceptions apply. Players may hold more than one non-FIFA nationality.

No.	Pos.	Nation	Player
15	FW	JPN	Minoru Suganuma (from (Japan) Kashiwa Reysol, previously on loan)
32	GK	JPN	Kei Uemura (loan from (Japan) Shonan Bellmare)
33	DF	JPN	Yoshiaki Fujita (from (Japan) Ōita Trinita)

Out: Note: Flags indicate national team as defined under FIFA eligibility rules; some limited exceptions apply. Players may hold more than one non-FIFA nationality.

No.	Pos.	Nation	Player
4	DF	JPN	Kentaro Ohi (loan to (Japan) Shonan Bellmare)
10	MF	JPN	Sho Naruoka (to (Japan) Avispa Fukuoka)
14	DF	KOR	Park Joo-ho (to (Switzerland) Basel)
17	MF	JPN	Yusuke Inuzuka (to (Japan) Ventforet Kofu)
24	MF	JPN	Takuya Matsuura (loan to (Japan) Avispa Fukuoka)
27	MF	JPN	Kota Ueda (to (Japan) Omiya Ardija)

=== Summer ===
In: Note: Flags indicate national team as defined under FIFA eligibility rules; some limited exceptions apply. Players may hold more than one non-FIFA nationality.

No.	Pos.	Nation	Player
49	MF	BRA	Rodrigo Souto (from (Brazil) São Paulo)

Out: Note: Flags indicate national team as defined under FIFA eligibility rules; some limited exceptions apply. Players may hold more than one non-FIFA nationality.

No.	Pos.	Nation	Player

== Competitions ==
=== J.League ===
==== Results by round ====
Round	1	2	3	4	5	6	7	8	9	10	11	12	13	14	15	16	17	18	19	20	21	22	23	24	25	26	27	28	29	30	31	32	33	34
Ground	A	A	H	A	H	A	H	A	H	A	A	H	A	H	H	A	H	A	H	A	H	A	H	A	H	A	H	A	H	H	A	H	A	H
Result	W	D	D	L	W	D	W	D	L	W	L	L	W	W	L	W	D	D	L	L	W	L	D	L	W	L	W	D	L	L	W	W	L	W
Position	5																																	8

Source: "World-Football.net". Archived from the original on July 24, 2011.
A = Away; H = Home; W = Win; D = Draw; L = Loss

==== Matches ====
5 March 2011 1	Ventforet Kofu	0 – 1	Júbilo Iwata	Yamanashi Chuo Bank Stadium
Saturday 14:03		Report	Yamamoto 81'	Attendance: 15,040; Referee: Matsumura

24 April 2011 2	Albirex Niigata	1 – 1	Júbilo Iwata	Tohoku Electric Power Big Swan Stadium
	Cho Young-Cheol 6' (pen.)	Summary	Gilsinho 68'	Attendance: 33,662

29 April 2011 3	Júbilo Iwata	1 – 1	Sanfrecce Hiroshima	Yamaha Stadium
	Kanazono 73'	Summary	Lee 68' (pen.)	Attendance: 11,319

3 May 2011 4	Kawasaki Frontale	1 – 0	Júbilo Iwata	Todoroki Athletics Stadium
	Kobayashi 90'	Summary	Yamamoto (yellow card) 15' (yellow-red card) 30'	Attendance: 18,449

7 May 2011 5	Júbilo Iwata	4 – 0	Montedio Yamagata	Yamaha Stadium
	Maeda 2', 45'; Yamazaki 13'; Yamada 60'	Summary		Attendance: 8,960

14 May 2011 6	Vegalta Sendai	3 – 3	Júbilo Iwata	Sendai Stadium
	Sugai 4'; Akamine 10'; Kakuda 88'	Summary	Yamada 58'; Yamazaki 60'; Kanazono 90+2'	Attendance: 11,544

21 May 2011 7	Júbilo Iwata	4 – 1	Avispa Fukuoka	Yamaha Stadium
	Yamazaki 5'; Maeda 32', 49'; Yamamoto 35'	Summary	Okamoto 86'	Attendance: 12,372

28 May 2011 8	Shimizu S-Pulse	0 – 0	Júbilo Iwata	Outsourcing Stadium Nihondaira
		Summary		Attendance: 12,678

11 June 2011 9	Júbilo Iwata	0 – 1	Nagoya Grampus	Yamaha Stadium
		Summary	Tamada 89'	Attendance: 12,067

15 June 2011 10	Kashiwa Reysol	0 – 3	Júbilo Iwata	Hitachi Kashiwa Soccer Stadium
		Summary	Kanazono 20'; Maeda 44', 59'	Attendance: 7,803

18 June 2011 11	Kashima Antlers	2 – 0	Júbilo Iwata	Kashima Soccer Stadium
	Koroki 6'; Tashiro 64'	Summary		Attendance: 11,830

22 June 2011 12	Júbilo Iwata	1 – 2	Omiya Ardija	Yamaha Stadium
	Maeda 2'	Summary	Murakami 15'; Kanakubo 90+5'	Attendance: 6,386

25 June 2011 13	Avispa Fukuoka	1 – 2	Júbilo Iwata	Level-5 stadium
	Naruoka 78'	Summary	Kanazono 17'; Yamada 43'	Attendance: 5,865

3 July 2011 14	Júbilo Iwata	3 – 0	Vissel Kobe	Yamaha Stadium
	Nasu 56'; Kanazono 72'; Kitamoto 73' (o.g.)	Summary		Attendance: 7,706

9 July 2011 15	Júbilo Iwata	1 – 2	Yokohama F. Marinos	Yamaha Stadium
	Nasu 17'	Summary	Watanabe 35'; Nakamura 51' (pen.)	Attendance: 11,226

13 July 2011 16	Cerezo Osaka	2 – 3	Júbilo Iwata	Nagai Ball Gall Field
	Kim Bo-Kyung 49'; Maruhashi 74'	Summary	Kanazono 63'; Komano 77'; Yamada 80'	Attendance: 8,076

17 July 2011 17	Júbilo Iwata	1 – 1	Urawa Red Diamonds	Yamaha Stadium
	Maeda 90+3' (pen.)	Summary	Kashiwagi 29'	Attendance: 18,623

23 July 2011 18	Gamba Osaka	2 – 2	Júbilo Iwata	Osaka Expo '70 Stadium
	Yamaguchi; Lee Keun-Ho 55'	Summary	Kanazono 37'; Yamada 70'	Attendance: 11,364

30 July 2011 19	Júbilo Iwata	1 – 2	Gamba Osaka	Yamaha Stadium
	Nasu 49'	Summary	Nakazawa 25'; Rafinha 72'	Attendance: 13,515

7 August 2011 20	Nagoya Grampus	2 – 1	Júbilo Iwata	Mizuho Athletic Stadium
	Ogawa 28'; Nagai 73'	Summary	Kanazono 19'	Attendance: 14,230

14 August 2011 21	Júbilo Iwata	6 – 1	Kashiwa Reysol	Yamaha Stadium
	S.Yamamoto 33'; Fujita 43'; Rodrigo Souto 49', 57'; Kanazono 65'; Sakai 86' (o.g.)	Summary	Leandro Domingues 38'; Park Dong-Hyuk (red card) 89'	Attendance: 12,472

20 August 2011 22	Yokohama F. Marinos	1 – 0	Júbilo Iwata	Nissan Stadium
	Ono 84'	Summary		Attendance: 24,518

24 August 2011 23	Júbilo Iwata	1 – 1	Vegalta Sendai	Yamaha Stadium
	Park Joo-Sung 71' (o.g.)	Summary	Akamine 47'	Attendance: 8,693

27 August 2011 24	Omiya Ardija	2 – 0	Júbilo Iwata	NACK5 Stadium Omiya
	Higashi 72'; Watabe 76'			Attendance: 10,013

10 September 2011 25	Júbilo Iwata	2 – 1	Shimizu S-Pulse	Yamaha Stadium
	Komano 45'; Maeda 61'	Summary	Omae 63'	Attendance: 30,516

17 September 2011 26	Sanfrecce Hiroshima	3 – 1	Júbilo Iwata	Hiroshima Big Arch
	Lee 3', 57'; Satō 20'	Summary	Maeda 25'	Attendance: 11,894

24 September 2011 27	Júbilo Iwata	1 – 0	Albirex Niigata	Yamaha Stadium
	Arata 90'	Summary		Attendance: 9,251

1 October 2011 28	Montedio Yamagata	1 – 1	Júbilo Iwata	ND Soft Stadium Yamagata
	Ito 3'	Summary	Maeda 57'	Attendance: 7,475

15 October 2011 29	Júbilo Iwata	1 – 2	Kashima Antlers	Yamaha Stadium
	Kanazono 68'	Summary	Tashiro 54'; S.Yamamoto 70' (o.g.)	Attendance: 8,313

23 October 2011 30	Júbilo Iwata	0 – 4	Cerezo Osaka	Yamaha Stadium
		Summary	Ogihara 37', 63'; Kurata 49'; Bando 90'	Attendance: 9,513

3 November 2011 31	Urawa Red Diamonds	0 – 3	Júbilo Iwata	Saitama Stadium 2002
		Summary	Maeda 13', 67'; Yamazaki 55'	Attendance: 34,263

19 November 2011 32	Júbilo Iwata	2 – 1	Ventforet Kofu	Yamaha Stadium
	Kanazono 2', 10'	Summary	Izawa 16'; Havenaar (yellow card) 37' (yellow-red card) 90+3'	Attendance: 7,244

27 November 2011 33	Vissel Kobe	3 – 1	Júbilo Iwata	Home's Stadium Kobe
	Kitamoto 19'; Soma 25'; Morioka 87'	Summary	Maeda 80'	Attendance: 17,187

3 December 2011 34	Júbilo Iwata	2 – 1	Kawasaki Frontale	Yamaha Stadium
	Gilsinho 17', 43'	Summary	Juninho 52'	Attendance: 12,349

==== League table ====
Pos	Team	Pld	W	D	L	GF	GA	GD	Pts
6	Kashima Antlers	34	13	11	10	53	40	+13	50
7	Sanfrecce Hiroshima	34	14	8	12	52	49	+3	50
8	Júbilo Iwata	34	13	8	13	53	45	+8	47
9	Vissel Kobe	34	13	7	14	44	45	−1	46
10	Shimizu S-Pulse	34	11	12	11	42	51	−9	45

Updated to match(es) played on December 3, 2011. Source: J.League Division 1
Rules for classification: 1st points; 2nd goal differential; 3rd goals scored; 4th head-to-head results; 5th disciplinary points; 6th draw. If two clubs are tied for first place, both clubs will be declared.

=== J.League Cup ===
5 June 2011 First round 1st Leg	Júbilo Iwata	2 – 0	Avispa Fukuoka	Yamaha Stadium, Iwata
	Yamazaki 13'; Kobayashi 63'	Report		Attendance: 9,440; Referee: T. Okabe

27 July 2011 First round 2nd Leg	Avispa Fukuoka	0 – 3 (0 – 5 agg.)	Júbilo Iwata	Level-5 stadium, Hakata-ku
		Report	Kaga 31'; Gilsinho 66'; Arata 83'	Attendance: 4,411; Referee: H. Matsuo

14 September ly 2011 Second round 1st Leg	Vegalta Sendai	0 – 0	Júbilo Iwata	Yurtec Stadium Sendai, Sendai
		Report		Attendance: 7,360; Referee: H. Kimura

28 September 2011 Second round 2nd Leg	Júbilo Iwata	3 – 0 (3 – 0 agg.)	Vegalta Sendai	Yamaha Stadium, Iwata
	Maeda 7'; Yamamoto 81', 86'	Report		Attendance: 6,339; Referee: M. Tojo

5 October 2011 Quarterfinals	Gamba Osaka	3–1	Júbilo Iwata	Expo'70 Stadium, Suita, Osaka
19:03	Sasaki 43'; Rafinha 67'; 76' (o.g.)	Summary	Nasu 7'	Attendance: 4,112; Referee: Nobutsugu Murakami

=== Emperor's Cup ===
2011-10-12 Second Round	Júbilo Iwata	3 – 0	Fukushima United	Yamaha Stadium, Iwata
19:00	Arata 33', 71', 83'	Report		Attendance: 2,019; Referee: Kazuhiko Matsumura

2011-11-16 Third Round	Júbilo Iwata	0 – 1	JEF United Chiba	Yamaha Stadium, Iwata
19:00		Report	Yonekura 67'	Attendance: 2,548; Referee: Koichiro Fukushima

== Squad statistics ==
=== Appearances and goals ===
As of 10 May 2012

No.	Pos	Nat	Player	Total		J-League		J-League Cup		Emperor's Cup	
No.	Pos	Nat	Player	Apps	Goals	Apps	Goals	Apps	Goals	Apps	Goals
1	GK	(Japan) JPN	Yoshikatsu Kawaguchi	37	0	34+0	0	3+0	0	0+0	0
2	DF	(Japan) JPN	Kenichi Kaga	33	1	30+0	0	3+0	1	0+0	0
3	DF	(Japan) JPN	Ryu Okada	6	0	0+4	0	0+2	0	0+0	0
5	MF	(Japan) JPN	Yuichi Komano	37	2	34+0	2	3+0	0	0+0	0
6	MF	(Japan) JPN	Daisuke Nasu	38	4	33+0	3	5+0	1	0+0	0
8	FW	(Brazil) BRA	Gilsinho	33	4	14+15	3	1+3	1	0+0	0
10	MF	(Japan) JPN	Hiroki Yamada	34	6	28+1	5	5+0	1	0+0	0
11	MF	(Japan) JPN	Norihiro Nishi	12	0	9+1	0	2+0	0	0+0	0
13	DF	(South Korea) KOR	Lee Gang-Jin	5	0	2+2	0	1+0	0	0+0	0
14	DF	(South Korea) KOR	Park Joo-Ho	11	0	11+0	0	0+0	0	0+0	0
15	MF	(Japan) JPN	Minoru Suganuma	12	0	0+11	0	0+1	0	0+0	0
16	DF	(Japan) JPN	Jo Kanazawa	9	0	0+8	0	1+0	0	0+0	0
17	FW	(Japan) JPN	Hidetaka Kanazono	30	12	16+11	12	1+2	0	0+0	0
18	FW	(Japan) JPN	Ryoichi Maeda	33	15	29+0	14	4+0	1	0+0	0
19	FW	(Japan) JPN	Tomoyuki Arata	15	5	0+13	1	0+2	1	0+0	3
20	MF	(Japan) JPN	Shuto Yamamoto	33	3	15+13	1	4+1	2	0+0	0
21	GK	(Japan) JPN	Naoki Hatta	2	0	0+0	0	2+0	0	0+0	0
22	MF	(Japan) JPN	Yuki Kobayashi	37	1	33+0	0	4+0	1	0+0	0
23	MF	(Japan) JPN	Kosuke Yamamoto	26	2	18+5	2	3+0	0	0+0	0
25	FW	(Japan) JPN	Ryohei Yamazaki	23	5	17+2	4	4+0	1	0+0	0
28	MF	(Japan) JPN	Keisuke Funatani	9	0	3+3	0	1+2	0	0+0	0
33	DF	(Japan) JPN	Yoshiaki Fujita	35	1	31+0	1	4+0	0	0+0	0
49	MF	(Brazil) BRA	Rodrigo Souto	14	2	12+0	2	2+0	0	0+0	0
50	DF	(Japan) JPN	Masahiro Koga	9	0	5+2	0	2+0	0	0+0	0

=== Top Scorers ===
Place	Position	Nation	Number	Name	J-League	J-League Cup	Emperor's Cup	Total
1	FW	(Japan)	18	Ryoichi Maeda	14	1	0	15
2	FW	(Japan)	17	Hidetaka Kanazono	12	0	0	12
3	MF	(Japan)	10	Hiroki Yamada	5	0	0	5
4	FW	(Japan)	25	Ryohei Yamazaki	4	1	0	5
4	FW	(Japan)	19	Tomoyuki Arata	1	1	3	5
6	DF	(Japan)	6	Daisuke Nasu	3	1	0	4
6	FW	(Brazil)	8	Gilsinho	3	1	0	4
6				Own goal	3	0	0	3
9	MF	(Brazil)	49	Rodrigo Souto	2	0	0	2
9	MF	(Japan)	5	Yuichi Komano	2	0	0	2
9	MF	(Japan)	23	Kosuke Yamamoto	2	0	0	2
12	MF	(Japan)	20	Shuto Yamamoto	1	2	0	3
12	DF	(Japan)	33	Yoshiaki Fujita	1	0	0	1
12	MF	(Japan)	22	Yuki Kobayashi	0	1	0	1
12	DF	(Japan)	2	Kenichi Kaga	0	1	0	1
				Totals	53	9	3	65

=== Disciplinary record ===
Number	Nation	Position	Name	J-League		J-League Cup		Emperor's Cup		Total	
Number	Nation	Position	Name	Yellow card	Red card	Yellow card	Red card	Yellow card	Red card	Yellow card	Red card
1	(Japan)	GK	Yoshikatsu Kawaguchi	1	0	0	0	0	0	1	0
2	(Japan)	DF	Kenichi Kaga	4	0	3	0	0	0	7	0
5	(Japan)	MF	Yuichi Komano	3	0	0	0	0	0	3	0
6	(Japan)	DF	Daisuke Nasu	5	0	1	0	0	0	6	0
8	(Brazil)	FW	Gilsinho	6	0	0	0	0	0	6	0
10	(Japan)	MF	Hiroki Yamada	4	0	1	0	0	0	5	0
14	(South Korea)	DF	Park Joo-Ho	3	0	0	0	0	0	3	0
16	(Japan)	DF	Jo Kanazawa	1	0	0	0	0	0	1	0
17	(Japan)	FW	Hidetaka Kanazono	3	0	0	0	0	0	3	0
18	(Japan)	FW	Ryoichi Maeda	4	0	0	0	0	0	4	0
20	(Japan)	MF	Shuto Yamamoto	3	1	0	0	0	0	3	1
21	(Japan)	GK	Naoki Hatta	0	0	1	0	0	0	1	0
22	(Japan)	MF	Yuki Kobayashi	2	0	1	0	0	0	3	0
23	(Japan)	MF	Kosuke Yamamoto	1	0	0	0	0	0	1	0
25	(Japan)	FW	Ryohei Yamazaki	3	0	1	0	0	0	4	0
28	(Japan)	MF	Keisuke Funatani	1	0	0	0	0	0	1	0
33	(Japan)	DF	Yoshiaki Fujita	4	0	0	0	0	0	4	0
49	(Brazil)	MF	Rodrigo Souto	1	0	0	0	0	0	1	0
			Totals	49	1	8	0	0	0	57	1
