= 2009 Júbilo Iwata season =

Júbilo Iwata
2009 season
- Manager: Masaaki Yanagishita
- Stadium: Yamaha Stadium
- J. League 1: 11th
- Emperor's Cup: 4th Round
- J. League Cup: GL-A 6th
- Top goalscorer: Ryoichi Maeda (20)

2009 Júbilo Iwata season

== Competitions ==
Competitions	Position
J. League 1	11th / 18 clubs
Emperor's Cup	4th Round
J. League Cup	GL-A 6th / 7 clubs

== Player statistics ==
No.	Pos.	Player	D.o.B. (Age)	Height / Weight	J. League 1		Emperor's Cup		J. League Cup		Total	
No.	Pos.	Player	D.o.B. (Age)	Height / Weight	Apps	Goals	Apps	Goals	Apps	Goals	Apps	Goals
1	GK	Yoshikatsu Kawaguchi	August 15, 1975 (aged 33)	cm / kg	26	0						
2	DF	Hideto Suzuki	October 7, 1974 (aged 34)	cm / kg	6	0						
3	DF	Takayuki Chano	November 23, 1976 (aged 32)	cm / kg	29	0						
4	DF	Kentaro Ohi	May 14, 1984 (aged 24)	cm / kg	17	0						
5	DF	Yūichi Komano	July 25, 1981 (aged 27)	cm / kg	34	1						
6	MF	Daisuke Nasu	October 10, 1981 (aged 27)	cm / kg	34	1						
7	MF	Yoshiaki Ota	June 11, 1983 (aged 25)	cm / kg	13	0						
8	FW	Gilsinho	April 4, 1984 (aged 24)	cm / kg	18	7						
9	FW	Masashi Nakayama	September 23, 1967 (aged 41)	cm / kg	1	0						
10	MF	Sho Naruoka	May 31, 1984 (aged 24)	cm / kg	19	3						
11	MF	Norihiro Nishi	May 9, 1980 (aged 28)	cm / kg	29	4						
13	FW	Hiroki Bandai	February 19, 1986 (aged 23)	cm / kg	7	0						
14	MF	Shinji Murai	December 1, 1979 (aged 29)	cm / kg	24	1						
15	DF	Kenichi Kaga	September 30, 1983 (aged 25)	cm / kg	9	0						
16	MF	Rodrigo	October 6, 1980 (aged 28)	cm / kg	12	0						
16	DF	Jo Kanazawa	July 9, 1976 (aged 32)	cm / kg	8	0						
17	MF	Yusuke Inuzuka	December 13, 1983 (aged 25)	cm / kg	15	0						
18	FW	Ryoichi Maeda	October 9, 1981 (aged 27)	cm / kg	34	20						
19	MF	Ryu Okada	April 10, 1984 (aged 24)	cm / kg	14	1						
20	MF	Shuto Yamamoto	June 1, 1985 (aged 23)	cm / kg	21	0						
21	GK	Shinya Yoshihara	April 19, 1978 (aged 30)	cm / kg	1	0						
22	FW	Robert Cullen	June 7, 1985 (aged 23)	cm / kg	4	0						
23	MF	Kosuke Yamamoto	October 29, 1989 (aged 19)	cm / kg	26	0						
24	MF	Takuya Matsuura	December 21, 1988 (aged 20)	cm / kg	10	0						
25	FW	Ryohei Yamazaki	March 14, 1989 (aged 19)	cm / kg	0	0						
26	FW	Yuki Oshitani	September 23, 1989 (aged 19)	cm / kg	0	0						
27	MF	Kota Ueda	May 9, 1986 (aged 22)	cm / kg	16	0						
28	MF	Keisuke Funatani	January 7, 1986 (aged 23)	cm / kg	10	0						
29	DF	Kyohei Suzaki	June 21, 1989 (aged 19)	cm / kg	0	0						
30	DF	Shinnosuke Honda	June 23, 1990 (aged 18)	cm / kg	0	0						
31	GK	Naoki Hatta	June 24, 1986 (aged 22)	cm / kg	8	0						
32	GK	Takuya Ohata	May 28, 1990 (aged 18)	cm / kg	0	0						
33	FW	Lee Keun-Ho	April 11, 1985 (aged 23)	cm / kg	24	12						

== Other pages ==
- (in Japanese) J. League official site
