= 2008 Júbilo Iwata season =

Júbilo Iwata
2008 season
- Manager: Atsushi Uchiyama; Ooft
- Stadium: Yamaha Stadium
- J. League 1: 16th
- Emperor's Cup: 5th Round
- J. League Cup: GL-B 3rd
- Top goalscorer: Gilsinho (9)

2008 Júbilo Iwata season

== Competitions ==
Competitions	Position
J. League 1	16th / 18 clubs
Emperor's Cup	5th Round
J. League Cup	GL-B 3rd / 4 clubs

== Domestic results ==
=== J. League 1 ===
Match	Date	Venue	Opponents	Score
1	2008..			-
2	2008..			-
3	2008..			-
4	2008..			-
5	2008..			-
6	2008..			-
7	2008..			-
8	2008..			-
9	2008..			-
10	2008..			-
11	2008..			-
12	2008..			-
13	2008..			-
14	2008..			-
15	2008..			-
16	2008..			-
17	2008..			-
18	2008..			-
19	2008..			-
20	2008..			-
21	2008..			-
22	2008..			-
23	2008..			-
24	2008..			-
25	2008..			-
26	2008..			-
27	2008..			-
28	2008..			-
29	2008..			-
30	2008..			-
31	2008..			-
32	2008..			-
33	2008..			-
34	2008..			-

=== Emperor's Cup ===
Match	Date	Venue	Opponents	Score
4th Round	2008..			-
5th Round	2008..			-

=== J. League Cup ===
Match	Date	Venue	Opponents	Score
GL-B-1	2008..			-
GL-B-2	2008..			-
GL-B-3	2008..			-
GL-B-4	2008..			-
GL-B-5	2008..			-
GL-B-6	2008..			-

== Player statistics ==
No.	Pos.	Player	D.o.B. (Age)	Height / Weight	J. League 1		Emperor's Cup		J. League Cup		Total	
No.	Pos.	Player	D.o.B. (Age)	Height / Weight	Apps	Goals	Apps	Goals	Apps	Goals	Apps	Goals
1	GK	Yoshikatsu Kawaguchi	August 15, 1975 (aged 32)	cm / kg	33	0						
2	DF	Hideto Suzuki	October 7, 1974 (aged 33)	cm / kg	8	0						
3	DF	Takayuki Chano	November 23, 1976 (aged 31)	cm / kg	27	1						
4	DF	Kentaro Ohi	May 14, 1984 (aged 23)	cm / kg	11	1						
5	DF	Makoto Tanaka	August 8, 1975 (aged 32)	cm / kg	26	1						
6	MF	Takahiro Kawamura	October 4, 1979 (aged 28)	cm / kg	11	1						
7	MF	Yoshiaki Ota	June 11, 1983 (aged 24)	cm / kg	1	0						
8	FW	Gilsinho	April 4, 1984 (aged 23)	cm / kg	30	9						
9	FW	Masashi Nakayama	September 23, 1967 (aged 40)	cm / kg	16	1						
10	MF	Sho Naruoka	May 31, 1984 (aged 23)	cm / kg	15	2						
11	MF	Norihiro Nishi	May 9, 1980 (aged 27)	cm / kg	12	2						
13	DF	Shun Morishita	May 11, 1986 (aged 21)	cm / kg	1	0						
14	MF	Shinji Murai	December 1, 1979 (aged 28)	cm / kg	24	0						
15	DF	Kenichi Kaga	September 30, 1983 (aged 24)	cm / kg	30	0						
16	MF	Hiroshi Nanami	November 28, 1972 (aged 35)	cm / kg	13	0						
17	MF	Yusuke Inuzuka	December 13, 1983 (aged 24)	cm / kg	29	1						
18	FW	Ryoichi Maeda	October 9, 1981 (aged 26)	cm / kg	22	8						
19	MF	Ryu Okada	April 10, 1984 (aged 23)	cm / kg	5	0						
20	MF	Ryosuke Nakashima	April 28, 1988 (aged 19)	cm / kg	0	0						
21	GK	Kenya Matsui	September 10, 1985 (aged 22)	cm / kg	1	0						
22	FW	Robert Cullen	June 7, 1985 (aged 22)	cm / kg	16	4						
23	MF	Kosuke Yamamoto	October 29, 1989 (aged 18)	cm / kg	9	0						
24	MF	Takuya Matsuura	December 21, 1988 (aged 19)	cm / kg	11	1						
25	DF	Yūichi Komano	July 25, 1981 (aged 26)	cm / kg	34	1						
26	MF	Toru Morino	May 12, 1987 (aged 20)	cm / kg	0	0						
27	MF	Kota Ueda	May 9, 1986 (aged 21)	cm / kg	25	1						
28	MF	Keisuke Funatani	January 7, 1986 (aged 22)	cm / kg	5	0						
29	FW	Ryohei Yamazaki	March 14, 1989 (aged 18)	cm / kg	6	0						
30	FW	Takashi Fujii	April 28, 1986 (aged 21)	cm / kg	0	0						
31	GK	Naoki Hatta	June 24, 1986 (aged 21)	cm / kg	1	0						
32	FW	Hiroki Bandai	February 19, 1986 (aged 22)	cm / kg	20	3						
33	DF	Kyohei Suzaki	June 21, 1989 (aged 18)	cm / kg	0	0						
34	FW	Yuki Oshitani	September 23, 1989 (aged 18)	cm / kg	0	0						
36	GK	Yohei Sato	November 22, 1972 (aged 35)	cm / kg	0	0						
37	MF	Shuto Yamamoto	June 1, 1985 (aged 22)	cm / kg	4	0						
38	MF	Rodrigo	October 6, 1980 (aged 27)	cm / kg	15	1						

== Other pages ==
- (in Japanese) J. League official site
