= 2007 Júbilo Iwata season =

Júbilo Iwata
2007 season
- Manager: Adílson; Atsushi Uchiyama
- Stadium: Yamaha Stadium
- J. League 1: 9th
- Emperor's Cup: 5th Round
- J. League Cup: GL-C 4th
- Top goalscorer: Ryoichi Maeda (12)

2007 Júbilo Iwata season

== Competitions ==
Competitions	Position
J. League 1	9th / 18 clubs
Emperor's Cup	5th Round
J. League Cup	GL-C 4th / 4 clubs

== Domestic results ==
=== J. League 1 ===
Match	Date	Venue	Opponents	Score
1	2007..			-
2	2007..			-
3	2007..			-
4	2007..			-
5	2007..			-
6	2007..			-
7	2007..			-
8	2007..			-
9	2007..			-
10	2007..			-
11	2007..			-
12	2007..			-
13	2007..			-
14	2007..			-
15	2007..			-
16	2007..			-
17	2007..			-
18	2007..			-
19	2007..			-
20	2007..			-
21	2007..			-
22	2007..			-
23	2007..			-
24	2007..			-
25	2007..			-
26	2007..			-
27	2007..			-
28	2007..			-
29	2007..			-
30	2007..			-
31	2007..			-
32	2007..			-
33	2007..			-
34	2007..			-

=== Emperor's Cup ===
Match	Date	Venue	Opponents	Score
4th Round	2007..			-
5th Round	2007..			-

=== J. League Cup ===
Match	Date	Venue	Opponents	Score
GL-C-1	2007..			-
GL-C-2	2007..			-
GL-C-3	2007..			-
GL-C-4	2007..			-
GL-C-5	2007..			-
GL-C-6	2007..			-

== Player statistics ==
No.	Pos.	Player	D.o.B. (Age)	Height / Weight	J. League 1		Emperor's Cup		J. League Cup		Total	
No.	Pos.	Player	D.o.B. (Age)	Height / Weight	Apps	Goals	Apps	Goals	Apps	Goals	Apps	Goals
1	GK	Yoshikatsu Kawaguchi	August 15, 1975 (aged 31)	cm / kg	32	0						
2	DF	Hideto Suzuki	October 7, 1974 (aged 32)	cm / kg	11	1						
3	DF	Takayuki Chano	November 23, 1976 (aged 30)	cm / kg	18	2						
4	DF	Kentaro Ohi	May 14, 1984 (aged 22)	cm / kg	26	1						
5	DF	Makoto Tanaka	August 8, 1975 (aged 31)	cm / kg	23	1						
6	MF	Marquinhos Paraná	July 20, 1977 (aged 29)	cm / kg	28	2						
7	MF	Yoshiaki Ota	June 11, 1983 (aged 23)	cm / kg	32	4						
8	MF	Naoya Kikuchi	November 24, 1984 (aged 22)	cm / kg	13	1						
8	MF	Henrique	May 16, 1985 (aged 21)	cm / kg	13	0						
9	FW	Masashi Nakayama	September 23, 1967 (aged 39)	cm / kg	15	1						
10	MF	Sho Naruoka	May 31, 1984 (aged 22)	cm / kg	30	8						
11	MF	Norihiro Nishi	May 9, 1980 (aged 26)	cm / kg	17	2						
13	DF	Shun Morishita	May 11, 1986 (aged 20)	cm / kg	0	0						
14	MF	Shinji Murai	December 1, 1979 (aged 27)	cm / kg	23	2						
15	DF	Kenichi Kaga	September 30, 1983 (aged 23)	cm / kg	30	2						
16	FW	Takenori Hayashi	October 14, 1980 (aged 26)	cm / kg	13	2						
17	MF	Yusuke Inuzuka	December 13, 1983 (aged 23)	cm / kg	22	1						
18	FW	Ryoichi Maeda	October 9, 1981 (aged 25)	cm / kg	22	12						
19	MF	Ryu Okada	April 10, 1984 (aged 22)	cm / kg	0	0						
20	MF	Ryosuke Nakashima	April 28, 1988 (aged 18)	cm / kg	0	0						
21	GK	Yohei Sato	November 22, 1972 (aged 34)	cm / kg	2	0						
22	FW	Robert Cullen	June 7, 1985 (aged 21)	cm / kg	26	7						
24	MF	Takuya Matsuura	December 21, 1988 (aged 18)	cm / kg	0	0						
25	MF	Fabrício	July 5, 1982 (aged 24)	cm / kg	25	2						
26	MF	Toru Morino	May 12, 1987 (aged 19)	cm / kg	0	0						
27	MF	Kota Ueda	May 9, 1986 (aged 20)	cm / kg	31	3						
28	MF	Keisuke Funatani	January 7, 1986 (aged 21)	cm / kg	13	0						
29	FW	Ryohei Yamazaki	March 14, 1989 (aged 17)	cm / kg	0	0						
30	GK	Naoki Hatta	June 24, 1986 (aged 20)	cm / kg	0	0						
31	GK	Kenya Matsui	September 10, 1985 (aged 21)	cm / kg	0	0						
32	MF	Kosuke Yamamoto	October 29, 1989 (aged 17)	cm / kg	3	0						

== Other pages ==
- (in Japanese) J. League official site
