= Yoshikatsu Kawaguchi =

Japanese footballer (born 1975)

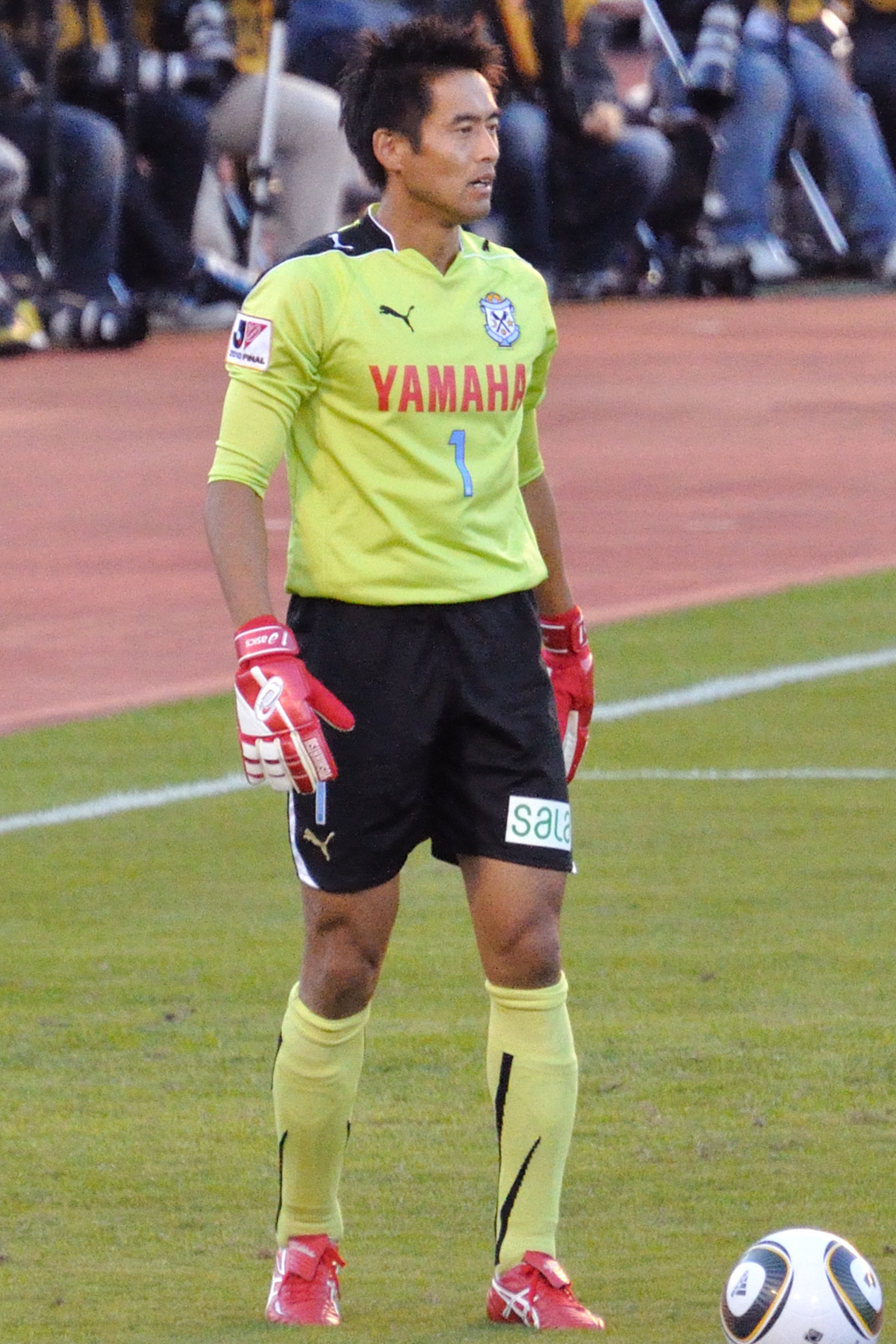
- Kawaguchi with Júbilo Iwata in 2010

Personal information
- Full name: Yoshikatsu Kawaguchi
- Date of birth: 15 August 1975 (age 51)
- Place of birth: Fuji, Shizuoka, Japan
- Height: 1.80 m (5 ft 11 in)
- Position: Goalkeeper

Youth career
- 1991–1993: Shimizu Shogyo High School

Senior career*
Years	Team	Apps	(Gls)
1994–2001	Yokohama F. Marinos	193	(0)
2001–2003	Portsmouth	12	(0)
2003–2005	Nordsjælland	8	(0)
2005–2013	Júbilo Iwata	228	(0)
2014–2015	Gifu	43	(0)
2016–2018	Sagamihara	43	(0)
Total		527	(0)

International career
1995–1996	Japan U23	10	(0)
1997–2010	Japan	116	(0)
Medal record
Men's football
Representing Japan
AFC Asian Cup
Winner	2000 Lebanon
Winner	2004 China
FIFA Confederations Cup
Runner-up	2001 Korea/Japan
- * Club domestic league appearances and goals

Yoshikatsu Kawaguchi (川口 能活, Kawaguchi Yoshikatsu; born 15 August 1975), also known as Yoshi Kawaguchi, is a Japanese former footballer who played as a goalkeeper.

Kawaguchi spent most of his professional career in the Japanese J1 League, with brief spells in Europe as a reserve goalkeeper. He has earned 116 international caps for Japan, making him one of the ten most capped players in the history of the team. He additionally served as captain from 2006 to 2008. He was part of the Japanese squads at the 1998, 2002, 2006 and 2010 editions of the FIFA World Cups, the 2004 and 2007 editions of the AFC Asian Cups, as well as the 1999 Copa América.

== Career ==
=== Early career ===
Born in Fuji, Shizuoka Prefecture, Kawaguchi studied at Shimizu Commercial High School and was a member of the football team there. After finishing high school, he joined the professional football team Yokohama Marinos (later Yokohama F. Marinos).

=== Portsmouth ===
Following impressive performances for both club and country, he moved to English club Portsmouth, signing for a club record £1.8m. However, he struggled to adapt to life in the English Football League, and struggled with the physical side of the First Division, notably in a 3–1 away defeat to Grimsby Town. Kawaguchi lost his place to veteran Dave Beasant after being held responsible for Portsmouth's 4–1 home defeat to underdogs Leyton Orient in the FA Cup. Despite his poor performances for Pompey he remained something of a cult hero with the fans, on account of his cheerful demeanour, and his insistence that he would work hard to regain his place. After a season of playing reserve team football, he made his final appearance for Portsmouth in the final game of the 2002–03 Football League First Division championship winning season, coming on at half time to a standing ovation in the 5–0 win against Bradford City.

=== Nordsjælland ===
Despite this brief reappearance, he realised that his future lay elsewhere, and moved on to Nordsjælland of the Danish league.

=== Júbilo Iwata ===
Prior to the 2005 Japanese football season, Kawaguchi returned to his home country when he signed with then-perennial title-contenders Júbilo Iwata.

== International career ==
=== Early career (1996–2001) ===
Kawaguchi was called up to the Japan national team and played in the Atlanta Olympic games. He kept a clean sheet against Brazil in the first game. He played in Japan's first ever World Cup game in 1998 in a 1–0 defeat to Argentina, and throughout the tournament, his stellar performance prevented Japan from being scored more than one, with all three Japanese defeats were just one-goal margin. In 2001, Kawaguchi was Japan's first-choice goalkeeper as the team finished runner-up in the Confederations Cup.

=== Captain (2004–2006) ===
Kawaguchi is a noted penalty stopper, making two saves in the shootout against Jordan in the 2004 Asian Cup quarter-final and also saving from Croatia's Darijo Srna in the 2006 World Cup. During the 2007 Asian Cup he was instrumental in Japan's quarter-final win against Australia making two saves from Harry Kewell and Lucas Neill in the penalty shootout, thus making him the Man of the Match.

In August 2006, it was revealed that he would wear the captain's armband, as new Japan manager Ivica Osim believed that former captain Tsuneyasu Miyamoto was not getting enough playing time at his domestic club, Gamba Osaka.

=== Marginal role (2008–2010) ===
Kawaguchi is his country's most-capped goalkeeper and overall third most-capped player with 116 caps for Japan, six behind second-placed Masami Ihara with 122 caps, but an injury in 2008 had since sidelined him from action. Long-time rival Seigo Narazaki had since been playing as first-choice keeper for Japan.

A broken leg sustained in a J1 League clash against Kyoto Sanga appeared to have sidelined him for the rest of the season, thus ruling him out of the 2010 World Cup. However, after making a full and quick recovery, Japanese head coach Takeshi Okada decided to include him in the final squad announced on 10 May 2010. Kawaguchi was one of two Japanese players (the other being Seigo Narazaki) to be named for their national team's fourth consecutive World Cup. Despite his period of inactivity, and having fallen to third in the pecking order, Okada selected him in the hope that his leadership and experience would aid the team's progress. Kawaguchi was appointed captain of the national team during team training on 21 May 2010.

Kawaguchi was not picked to play for the national team under coach Alberto Zaccheroni, and with youngster Eiji Kawashima impressing in Japan's 2011 Asian Cup success, Kawaguchi's international career was effectively over.

== Career statistics ==
=== Club ===
Appearances and goals by club, season and competition
Club	Season	League			National Cup (Note: Includes Emperor's Cup, FA Cup, Danish Cup)		League Cup (Note: Includes J.League Cup, EFL Cup, Danish League Cup)		Continental		Total	
Club	Season	Division	Apps	Goals	Apps	Goals	Apps	Goals	Apps	Goals	Apps	Goals
Yokohama F. Marinos (Note: Yokohama Marinos became Yokohama F. Marinos in 1999.)	1994	J1 League	0	0	0	0	0	0	—		0	0
Yokohama F. Marinos	1995	J1 League	41	0	2	0	—		—		43	0
Yokohama F. Marinos	1996	J1 League	15	0	0	0	13	0	—		28	0
Yokohama F. Marinos	1997	J1 League	22	0	2	0	0	0	—		24	0
Yokohama F. Marinos	1998	J1 League	34	0	1	0	0	0	—		35	0
Yokohama F. Marinos	1999	J1 League	28	0	2	0	6	0	—		36	0
Yokohama F. Marinos	2000	J1 League	28	0	3	0	5	0	—		36	0
Yokohama F. Marinos	2001	J1 League	25	0	0	0	7	0	—		32	0
Yokohama F. Marinos	Total		193	0	10	0	31	0	0	0	234	0
Portsmouth	2001–02	First Division	11	0	1	0	0	0	0	0	12	0
Portsmouth	2002–03	First Division	1	0	0	0	0	0	0	0	1	0
Portsmouth	2003–04	Premier League	0	0	—		—		—		0	0
Portsmouth	Total		12	0	1	0	0	0	0	0	13	0
Júbilo Iwata	2005	J1 League	29	0	3	0	1	0	1	0	34	0
Júbilo Iwata	2006	J1 League	34	0	1	0	3	0	—		38	0
Júbilo Iwata	2007	J1 League	32	0	1	0	3	0	—		36	0
Júbilo Iwata	2008	J1 League	33	0	0	0	1	0	—		34	0
Júbilo Iwata	2009	J1 League	26	0	0	0	4	0	—		30	0
Júbilo Iwata	2010	J1 League	17	0	1	0	4	0	—		22	0
Júbilo Iwata	2011	J1 League	34	0	1	0	3	0	—		38	0
Júbilo Iwata	2012	J1 League	2	0	1	0	0	0	—		3	0
Júbilo Iwata	2013	J1 League	21	0	1	0	1	0	—		23	0
Júbilo Iwata	Total		228	0	9	0	20	0	1	0	258	0
Gifu	2014	J2 League	37	0	0	0	—		—		37	0
Gifu	2015	J2 League	6	0	0	0	—		—		6	0
Gifu	Total		43	0	0	0	0	0	0	0	43	0
Sagamihara	2016	J3 League	19	0	0	0	—		—		19	0
Sagamihara	2017	J3 League	18	0	—		—		—		18	0
Sagamihara	2018	J3 League	6	0	—		—		—		6	0
Sagamihara	Total		43	0	0	0	0	0	0	0	43	0
Career total			519	0	20	0	51	0	1	0	591	0

=== International ===
Appearances and goals by national team and year
National team	Year	Apps	Goals
Japan	1997	21	0
Japan	1998	9	0
Japan	1999	3	0
Japan	2000	8	0
Japan	2001	9	0
Japan	2002	2	0
Japan	2003	2	0
Japan	2004	11	0
Japan	2005	14	0
Japan	2006	19	0
Japan	2007	12	0
Japan	2008	6	0
Total		116	0

== Honours ==
Yokohama F. Marinos

- J1 League: 1995

Portsmouth

- Football League First Division: 2002–03

Jubilo Iwata

- J.League Cup: 2010

Japan

- AFC Asian Cup: 2000, 2004
- AFC-OFC Challenge Cup: 2001
- Afro-Asian Cup of Nations: 2007

Individual

- J.League Rookie of the Year: 1995
- FIFA Confederations Cup All-Star Team: 2001
- AFC Player of the Month: June 2001
- AFC Asian Cup Team of the Tournament: 2004
- J1 League Best XI: 2006
- J.League Fair Play Award: 2008
- J.League 20th Anniversary Team: 2013
- J.League 30th Anniversary Team: 2023

== See also ==
- List of men's footballers with 100 or more international caps
