= Yūichi Komano =

Japanese footballer

Yuichi Komano 駒野 友一
Personal information
- Full name: Yuichi Komano
- Date of birth: 25 July 1981 (age 45)
- Place of birth: Kainan, Wakayama, Japan
- Height: 1.73 m (5 ft 8 in)
- Position: Defender

Youth career
- –1993: Ono Elementary School
- 1994–1996: Kainan Daisan Junior High School
- 1997–1999: Sanfrecce Hiroshima

Senior career*
Years	Team	Apps	(Gls)
2000–2007	Sanfrecce Hiroshima	191	(9)
2008–2015	Júbilo Iwata	257	(13)
2016	FC Tokyo	1	(0)
2016	→ FC Tokyo U-23 (loan)	4	(0)
2016	→ Avispa Fukuoka (loan)	12	(1)
2017–2018	Avispa Fukuoka	63	(2)
2019–2022	FC Imabari	92	(2)
Total		620	(27)

International career^{‡}
2000–2001	Japan U-20	10	(0)
2002	Japan U-23	4	(0)
2005–2013	Japan	78	(1)
Medal record
Representing Japan
Asian Games
Silver medal – second place	2002 Busan	Team
AFC U-19 Championship
Runner-up	2000 Iran
- * Club domestic league appearances and goals as of 27 November 2022, 12:00 (UTC) ‡ National team caps and goals as of 16 August 2013, 14:04 (UTC)

Yuichi Komano (駒野 友一, Komano Yūichi; born 25 July 1981) is a former Japanese professional footballer who last played as a defender. He played for Japan national team until 2013.

== Club career ==
Komano played for his local junior high school team. He was invited for trials from several clubs, including Gamba Osaka, JEF United Ichihara, Sanfrecce Hiroshima and local high school powerhouse Hatsushiba Hashimoto. He decided to join Sanfrecce Hiroshima youth team and entered Yoshida High School in Hiroshima.

Komano was the first-choice right back for the club from 2001. He suffered several serious injuries and illnesses. He damaged the cruciate ligaments of his left knee in the match against Yokohama FC on 16 August 2003. While he was in hospital, he suffered from a venous thrombosis. Because of these, he was sidelined until April 2004. He broke his left collar bone in an Olympic game against Ghana in August 2004. In September of the same year, he also suffered from a uveitis problem that might have caused blindness. Komano moved to Júbilo Iwata for the 2008 season after Hiroshima was relegated to J2 League.

Komano played as regular right side-back and played all 34 matches every season until 2013 except 2010 season for injury. However Júbilo was relegated to J2 League end of 2014 season. He played many matches in 2 seasons in J2, Júbilo returned to J1 end of 2015 season.

In 2016, Komano moved to FC Tokyo. However he could hardly play behind young player Ryoya Ogawa.

In July 2016, Komano moved to Avispa Fukuoka. Although he played many matches, Avispa finished at the bottom place in 2016 season and was relegated to J2 League. Although he played as regular player in 2017, his opportunity to play decreased in 2018 and he left the club end of 2018 season.

In 2019, Komano signed with Japan Football League club FC Imabari.

In 2022, Komano retired from football after 23 years as a professional footballer.

== International career ==
In June 2001, Komano was selected Japan U20 national team for 2001 World Youth Championship. At this tournament, he played full-time in all 3 matches as left side midfielder and left side back. In August 2004, he represented Japan U23 national team at the 2004 Olympics and he played two matches as left side back and left side midfielder.

He made his full international debut for Japan national team on 3 August 2005 in a 2005 East Asian Football Championship match against China. He was a member of the Japan team for the 2006 World Cup finals as a backup for first-choice Akira Kaji. Because of Kaji's injury, Komano played in Japan's opening game against Australia. He was also a member for the 2007 Asian Cup finals. He played all the Japan games except one for which he wasn't eligible due to suspension.

On 29 June 2010, Komano missed a penalty in a penalty shoot-out against Paraguay as Japan lost 5–3 in the 2010 World Cup second round.

Komano scored his first international goal in a friendly against Tajikistan on 11 October 2011 at Nagai Stadium. He played 78 games and scored 1 goal for Japan. His last international match was in 2013.

== Career statistics ==
As of the end 2022 season.

=== Club ===
Appearances and goals by club, season and competition
Club	Season	League			National cup		League cup		Continental		Total	
Club	Season	Division	Apps	Goals	Apps	Goals	Apps	Goals	Apps	Goals	Apps	Goals
Sanfrecce Hiroshima	2000	J.League Div 1	0	0	1	0	3	0	-		4	0
Sanfrecce Hiroshima	2001	J.League Div 1	24	1	2	0	3	0	-		29	1
Sanfrecce Hiroshima	2002	J.League Div 1	27	1	4	0	2	0	-		33	1
Sanfrecce Hiroshima	2003	J.League Div 2	23	0	0	0	-		-		23	0
Sanfrecce Hiroshima	2004	J.League Div 1	18	1	1	0	3	0	-		22	1
Sanfrecce Hiroshima	2005	J.League Div 1	34	2	1	0	4	0	-		39	2
Sanfrecce Hiroshima	2006	J.League Div 1	31	2	2	0	1	0	-		34	2
Sanfrecce Hiroshima	2007	J.League Div 1	34	2	5	1	3	0	-		42	3
Sanfrecce Hiroshima	Total		191	9	16	1	19	0	-		226	10
Júbilo Iwata	2008	J.League Div 1	34	1	0	0	1	1	-		35	2
Júbilo Iwata	2009	J.League Div 1	34	1	1	0	1	0	-		36	1
Júbilo Iwata	2010	J.League Div 1	23	0	0	0	4	0	-		27	0
Júbilo Iwata	2011	J.League Div 1	34	2	0	0	3	0	1 (Note: Includes Suruga Bank Championship)	0	38	2
Júbilo Iwata	2012	J.League Div 1	34	3	1	0	4	0	-		39	3
Júbilo Iwata	2013	J.League Div 1	34	2	2	0	4	1	-		40	3
Júbilo Iwata	2014	J.League Div 2	35	3	2	0	-		-		37	3
Júbilo Iwata	2015	J2 League	29	1	0	0	-		-		29	1
Júbilo Iwata	Total		257	13	6	0	17	2	1	0	281	15
FC Tokyo	2016	J1 League	1	0	0	0	0	0	2	0	3	0
FC Tokyo U-23	2016	J3 League	4	0	-		-		-		4	0
Avispa Fukuoka	2016	J1 League	12	1	0	0	0	0	-		12	1
Avispa Fukuoka	2017	J2 League	39	1	0	0	-		-		39	1
Avispa Fukuoka	2018	J2 League	24	1	1	0	-		-		25	1
Avispa Fukuoka	Total		75	3	1	0	0	0	-		76	3
FC Imabari	2019	JFL	29	1	-		-		-		29	1
FC Imabari	2020	J3 League	24	1	-		-		-		24	1
FC Imabari	2021	J3 League	23	0	1	1	-		-		24	1
FC Imabari	2022	J3 League	17	0	-		-		-		17	0
Career total			621	27	24	2	36	2	3	0	684	31

=== International ===
Appearances and goals by national team and year
National team	Year	Apps	Goals
Japan	2005	5	0
Japan	2006	10	0
Japan	2007	12	0
Japan	2008	13	0
Japan	2009	9	0
Japan	2010	11	0
Japan	2011	7	1
Japan	2012	5	0
Japan	2013	6	0
Total		78	1

Score and result list Japan's goal tally first, score column indicates score after Komano goal.

International goal scored by Yūichi Komano
No.	Date	Venue	Opponent	Score	Result	Competition
1	11 October 2011	Nagai Stadium, Osaka, Japan	Tajikistan	3–0	8–0	2014 FIFA World Cup qualification

== Honours ==
Júbilo Iwata

- J.League Cup: 2010
- Suruga Bank Championship: 2011

Japan

- EAFF East Asian Cup: 2013

Individual

- J.League Best XI: 2012
