= Lee Woo-jin (footballer) =

South Korean footballer (born 1986)

Lee Woo-Jin 이우진
Personal information
- Full name: Lee Woo-Jin
- Date of birth: 25 April 1986 (age 40)
- Place of birth: Daejeon, South Korea
- Height: 1.81 m (5 ft 11 in)
- Position: Centre back

Team information
- Current team: Retired
- Number: 19

Youth career
- 1999–2001: Joongdong Middle School

Senior career*
Years	Team	Apps	(Gls)
2002–2003	Suwon Bluewings	1	(0)
2004–2005	Tokyo Verdy	24	(1)
2006–2009	Busan I'Park	59	(1)
2010–2011	Júbilo Iwata	32	(0)
2012–2014	Jeonbuk Hyundai	2	(0)
2012	→ FC Machida Zelvia (loan)	11	(1)
2013	→ Daejeon Citizen (loan)	32	(1)
2015	Daejeon Citizen	20	(0)
2016–	Jeju United	3	(1)
- Gyeongju KHNP

International career^{‡}
2003	South Korea U-17		
2003–2005	South Korea U-20	22	(3)
2009	South Korea	1	(0)
- * Club domestic league appearances and goals as of 1 December 2016 ‡ National team caps and goals as of 3 June 2009

- Lee Woo-jin
- Hangul: 이우진
- RR: I Ujin
- MR: I Ujin

Lee Woo-Jin (Korean: 이우진; born 25 April 1986) is a South Korean footballer who plays as a centre back for Jeju United. His previous club is Suwon Bluewings, Busan I'Park, Japanese clubs Tokyo Verdy and Júbilo Iwata.

On 3 June 2009, he played at first senior level game against Oman national football team after coming on as a substitute at the 59th minute, but the A-match appearances did not record.

On 18 November 2009, he was transferred to J1 League club Júbilo Iwata for a three-year contract.

== Statistics ==
As of 9 January 2012

Club performance			League		Cup		League Cup		Total	
Season	Club	League	Apps	Goals	Apps	Goals	Apps	Goals	Apps	Goals
South Korea			League		KFA Cup		League Cup		Total	
2002	Suwon Bluewings	K-League	0	0	0	0	0	0	0	0
2003	Suwon Bluewings	K-League	1	0	0	0	-		1	0
Japan			League		Emperor's Cup		League Cup		Total	
2004	Tokyo Verdy	J1 League	7	0	4	1	2	0	13	1
2005	Tokyo Verdy	J1 League	17	1	0	0	2	0	19	1
South Korea			League		KFA Cup		League Cup		Total	
2006	Busan I'Park	K-League	12	0	1	0	8	0	21	0
2007	Busan I'Park	K-League	6	0	0	0	0	0	6	0
2008	Busan I'Park	K-League	17	0	0	0	4	0	21	0
2009	Busan I'Park	K-League	24	1	2	0	8	1	34	2
Japan			League		Emperor's Cup		League Cup		Total	
2010	Júbilo Iwata	J1 League	28	0	0	0	6	1	34	1
2011	Júbilo Iwata	J1 League	4	0	1	0	6	0	11	0
South Korea			League		KFA Cup		League Cup		Total	
2012	Jeonbuk Hyundai	K-League								
Total	South Korea		59	1	3	0	20	1	82	2
Total	Japan		56	1	5	1	16	1	77	3
Career total			115	2	8	1	36	2	159	5

Korea Republic national team
Year	Apps	Goals
2009	1	0
Total	1	0

== Honors ==
=== Club ===
Tokyo Verdy

Emperor's Cup: 2004
