= Robert Cullen (footballer) =

Japanese footballer

Robert Cullen カレン・ロバート
Personal information
- Full name: Robert Cullen
- Date of birth: 7 June 1985 (age 41)
- Place of birth: Tsuchiura, Ibaraki, Japan
- Height: 1.80 m (5 ft 11 in)
- Positions: Forward; midfielder

Youth career
- 2001–2003: Ichiritsu Funabashi High School

Senior career*
Years	Team	Apps	(Gls)
2004–2010	Júbilo Iwata	110	(29)
2010	Roasso Kumamoto	18	(3)
2011–2013	VVV-Venlo	69	(7)
2014	Suphanburi	22	(7)
2015	Seoul E-Land	35	(2)
2016	NorthEast United	8	(0)
2018	Leatherhead	8	(3)
Total		270	(51)

International career
2003–2005	Japan U20	11	(0)
Medal record
Júbilo Iwata
Winner	J.League Cup	2010
Runner-up	Emperor's Cup	2004
Representing Japan
AFC U-19 Championship
Bronze medal – third place	2004 Malaysia
- * Club domestic league appearances and goals

Robert Cullen (カレン・ロバート, Karen Robāto; born 7 June 1985) is a former Japanese footballer of Irish descent.

== Club career ==
Cullen is a forward, Cullen made his senior football debut for Júbilo Iwata on 5 May 2004, Oita Trinita being the opponent.

Cullen started training in the youth ranks at Kashiwa Reysol before eventually joining the team at Ichiritsu Funabashi High School. After his graduation, he signed with Jubilo Iwata in 2004. Although mostly limited to substitute appearances and the occasional league cup start in his rookie year, big things were expected of Cullen as he matured and gained experience playing with such seasoned professionals as Masashi Nakayama and Toshiya Fujita.

He left Júbilo in 2010 to join Roasso Kumamoto of J2 League. In January 2011 it was announced that Cullen joined Dutch Eredivisie club VVV-Venlo, best known in Japan for featuring another Japanese, Maya Yoshida, and having been Keisuke Honda's first European club. In July 2018, Cullen signed for English non-league side Leatherhead FC.

== National team career ==
In 2005, Cullen selected Japanese citizenship in order to be able to play for the Japan national team. He was a member of the Japan national U-20 team which played in the 2005 World Youth Championship held in the Netherlands. He played all 4 matches.

In February 2012 it was reported that Michael O'Neill had contacted Cullen with a view to convincing him to play for the Northern Ireland national team.

== Club statistics ==
Club	Season	League		Cup^{1}		League Cup^{2}		Continental^{3}		Other^{4}		Total	
Club	Season	Apps	Goals	Apps	Goals	Apps	Goals	Apps	Goals	Apps	Goals	Apps	Goals
Funabashi High School	2003	-		3	0	-		-		-		3	0
Funabashi High School	Total	-		3	0	-		-		-		3	0
Júbilo Iwata	2004	9	0	0	0	4	0	2	1	-		15	1
Júbilo Iwata	2005	31	13	2	1	2	0	5	1	-		40	15
Júbilo Iwata	2006	23	5	2	0	5	0	-		-		30	5
Júbilo Iwata	2007	26	7	1	2	4	2	-		-		31	11
Júbilo Iwata	2008	16	4	1	1	3	3	-		-		20	8
Júbilo Iwata	2009	4	0	3	1	1	0	-		-		8	1
Júbilo Iwata	2010	1	0	0	0	0	0	-		-		1	0
Júbilo Iwata	Total	110	29	9	5	19	5	7	2	-		145	41
Roasso Kumamoto	2010	18	3	1	0	-		-		-		19	3
Roasso Kumamoto	Total	18	3	1	0	-		-		-		19	3
VVV-Venlo	2010/11	15	2	-		-		-		4	2	19	4
VVV-Venlo	2011/12	28	3	1	0	-		-				29	3
VVV-Venlo	2012/13	26	2			-		-				26	2
VVV-Venlo	Total	69	7	1	0	-		-		4	2	68	9
Suphanburi	2014	22	7	-		-		-		0	0	22	7
Suphanburi	Total	22	7	0	0	-		-		0	0	22	7
Seoul E-Land	2015	35	2	-		-		-		0	0	35	2
Seoul E-Land	Total	35	2	0	0	-		-		0	0	35	2
NorthEast United	2016	8	0	-		-		-		-		8	0
NorthEast United	Total	8	0	-		-		-		-		8	0
Career total		262	48	15	5	19	5	7	2	4	2	307	62

^{1}Includes Emperor's Cup.

^{2}Includes J. League Cup.

^{3}Includes AFC Champions League.

^{4}Includes Eredivisie Playoffs.
