= 2013 Júbilo Iwata season =

Júbilo Iwata
2013 season
- Manager: Hitoshi Morishita; Tetsu Nagasawa; Takashi Sekizuka
- Stadium: Yamaha Stadium
- J1 League: 17th

The 2013 Júbilo Iwata season saw the club compete in the J1 League, the top league of Japanese football, in which they finished 17th.

== J1 League ==
=== League table ===
Pos	Team	Pld	W	D	L	GF	GA	GD	Pts	Qualification or relegation
14	Omiya Ardija	34	14	3	17	45	48	−3	45	
15	Ventforet Kofu	34	8	13	13	30	41	−11	37	
16	Shonan Bellmare (R)	34	6	7	21	34	62	−28	25	Relegation to 2014 J.League Division 2
17	Júbilo Iwata (R)	34	4	11	19	40	56	−16	23	Relegation to 2014 J.League Division 2
18	Oita Trinita (R)	34	2	8	24	31	67	−36	14	Relegation to 2014 J.League Division 2

Updated to match(es) played on 7 December 2013. Source: J.League Division 1
Rules for classification: 1) points; 2) goal difference; 3) number of goals scored.
(R) Relegated

=== Match details ===
J1 League match details
Match	Date	Team	Score	Team	Venue	Attendance
1	2013.03.02	Nagoya Grampus	1-1	Júbilo Iwata	Toyota Stadium	21,748
2	2013.03.09	Júbilo Iwata	0-1	Omiya Ardija	Yamaha Stadium	10,773
3	2013.03.16	Yokohama F. Marinos	2-1	Júbilo Iwata	Nissan Stadium	19,195
4	2013.03.30	Júbilo Iwata	3-3	Sagan Tosu	Yamaha Stadium	8,741
5	2013.04.06	Urawa Reds	2-1	Júbilo Iwata	Saitama Stadium 2002	23,295
6	2013.04.13	Shimizu S-Pulse	1-0	Júbilo Iwata	IAI Stadium Nihondaira	15,113
7	2013.04.20	Júbilo Iwata	0-2	Sanfrecce Hiroshima	Yamaha Stadium	8,377
8	2013.04.27	Júbilo Iwata	4-0	Shonan Bellmare	Yamaha Stadium	9,272
9	2013.05.03	Ventforet Kofu	2-1	Júbilo Iwata	Yamanashi Chuo Bank Stadium	14,062
10	2013.05.06	FC Tokyo	2-2	Júbilo Iwata	Ajinomoto Stadium	28,565
11	2013.05.11	Júbilo Iwata	0-1	Kashiwa Reysol	Yamaha Stadium	9,444
12	2013.05.18	Júbilo Iwata	2-4	Kawasaki Frontale	Yamaha Stadium	10,429
13	2013.05.25	Oita Trinita	1-1	Júbilo Iwata	Oita Bank Dome	11,141
14	2013.07.06	Júbilo Iwata	2-2	Cerezo Osaka	Yamaha Stadium	12,206
15	2013.07.10	Júbilo Iwata	2-1	Albirex Niigata	Yamaha Stadium	5,698
16	2013.07.13	Vegalta Sendai	1-1	Júbilo Iwata	Yurtec Stadium Sendai	14,318
17	2013.07.17	Kashima Antlers	1-1	Júbilo Iwata	Kashima Soccer Stadium	6,681
18	2013.07.31	Júbilo Iwata	1-2	Urawa Reds	Shizuoka Stadium	20,049
19	2013.08.03	Júbilo Iwata	2-3	Nagoya Grampus	Yamaha Stadium	14,272
20	2013.08.10	Sanfrecce Hiroshima	2-1	Júbilo Iwata	Edion Stadium Hiroshima	19,705
21	2013.08.17	Shonan Bellmare	1-1	Júbilo Iwata	Shonan BMW Stadium Hiratsuka	12,140
22	2013.08.24	Júbilo Iwata	0-0	FC Tokyo	Yamaha Stadium	12,809
23	2013.08.28	Albirex Niigata	4-2	Júbilo Iwata	Tohoku Denryoku Big Swan Stadium	18,926
24	2013.08.31	Júbilo Iwata	1-1	Ventforet Kofu	Yamaha Stadium	9,307
25	2013.09.13	Kashiwa Reysol	1-3	Júbilo Iwata	Hitachi Kashiwa Stadium	8,499
26	2013.09.21	Júbilo Iwata	2-3	Kashima Antlers	Yamaha Stadium	10,821
27	2013.09.28	Cerezo Osaka	2-0	Júbilo Iwata	Kincho Stadium	15,704
28	2013.10.05	Júbilo Iwata	1-1	Vegalta Sendai	Yamaha Stadium	8,218
29	2013.10.19	Kawasaki Frontale	2-1	Júbilo Iwata	Kawasaki Todoroki Stadium	17,523
30	2013.10.27	Júbilo Iwata	0-1	Shimizu S-Pulse	Yamaha Stadium	12,467
31	2013.11.10	Sagan Tosu	1-0	Júbilo Iwata	Best Amenity Stadium	11,118
32	2013.11.23	Júbilo Iwata	0-1	Yokohama F. Marinos	Yamaha Stadium	13,790
33	2013.11.30	Omiya Ardija	3-0	Júbilo Iwata	NACK5 Stadium Omiya	11,325
34	2013.12.07	Júbilo Iwata	3-1	Oita Trinita	Yamaha Stadium	8,534
