= Akihiko Takeshige =

Japanese footballer

Akihiko Takeshige 竹重 安希彦
Personal information
- Full name: Akihiko Takeshige
- Date of birth: August 21, 1987 (age 39)
- Place of birth: Yamaguchi, Japan
- Height: 1.86 m (6 ft 1 in)
- Position: Goalkeeper

Team information
- Current team: SC Sagamihara
- Number: 21

Youth career
- 2003–2005: Saikyo High School

College career
| Years | Team | Apps | (Gls) |
| 2006–2009 | Hannan University | | |

Senior career*
| Years | Team | Apps | (Gls) |
| 2010–2014 | Júbilo Iwata | 1 | (0) |
| 2013 | → Albirex Niigata (loan) | 0 | (0) |
| 2015–2018 | Tochigi SC | 44 | (0) |
| 2019–2021 | Yokohama FC | 1 | (0) |
| 2021- | SC Sagamihara | 23 | (0) |
Medal record
5
Júbilo Iwata
| Winner | J.League Cup | 2010 |
- * Club domestic league appearances and goals as of 15 August 2024 @ 16:23(AEST)

Akihiko Takeshige (竹重 安希彦, Takeshige Akihiko; born August 21, 1987) is a Japanese football player who currently plays for SC Sagamihara.

== Club statistics ==
Updated to 23 February 2018.

| Club | Season | League | | Emperor's Cup | | J. League Cup | | Total | |
| Club | Season | Apps | Goals | Apps | Goals | Apps | Goals | Apps | Goals |
|---|---|---|---|---|---|---|---|---|---|
| Júbilo Iwata | 2010 | 0 | 0 | 0 | 0 | 0 | 0 | 0 | 0 |
| Júbilo Iwata | 2011 | 0 | 0 | 0 | 0 | 0 | 0 | 0 | 0 |
| Júbilo Iwata | 2012 | 1 | 0 | 2 | 0 | 2 | 0 | 5 | 0 |
| Albirex Niigata | 2013 | 0 | 0 | - | | 3 | 0 | 3 | 0 |
| Júbilo Iwata | 2013 | 0 | 0 | 0 | 0 | 0 | 0 | 0 | 0 |
| Júbilo Iwata | 2014 | 0 | 0 | 0 | 0 | - | | 0 | 0 |
| Tochigi SC | 2015 | 22 | 0 | 0 | 0 | - | | 22 | 0 |
| Tochigi SC | 2016 | 0 | 0 | – | | – | | 0 | 0 |
| Tochigi SC | 2017 | 1 | 0 | – | | – | | 1 | 0 |
| Career total | | 24 | 0 | 2 | 0 | 5 | 0 | 31 | 0 |
