= 2016 FC Tokyo U-23 season =

FC Tokyo U-23
2016 season
- Manager: Takayoshi Amma; Tadashi Nakamura
- Stadium: Ajinomoto Field Nishigaoka
- J3 League: 10th

2016 FC Tokyo U-23 season.

== J3 League ==
=== League table ===
Pos	Team	Pld	W	D	L	GF	GA	GD	Pts
7	Fujieda MYFC	30	14	3	13	48	42	+6	45
8	FC Ryukyu	30	12	8	10	46	46	0	44
9	Gamba Osaka U-23	30	10	8	12	42	41	+1	38
10	FC Tokyo U-23	30	9	9	12	32	31	+1	36
11	SC Sagamihara	30	9	8	13	29	46	−17	35
12	Cerezo Osaka U-23	30	8	8	14	38	47	−9	32
13	Grulla Morioka	30	6	12	12	43	47	−4	30

Updated to match(es) played on 20 November 2016. Source: 2016 MEIJI YASUDA J3 LEAGUE League table
Rules for classification: 1) Points; 2) Goal difference; 3) Goals scored; 4th) head-to-head results; 5th) disciplinary points; 6th) draw

=== Match details ===
J3 League match details
Match	Date	Team	Score	Team	Venue	Attendance
1	2016.03.13	SC Sagamihara	1-0	FC Tokyo U-23	Sagamihara Gion Stadium	7,280
2	2016.03.20	FC Tokyo U-23	2-3	FC Ryukyu	Ajinomoto Field Nishigaoka	3,584
3	2016.04.03	Blaublitz Akita	1-0	FC Tokyo U-23	Akigin Stadium	2,491
4	2016.04.10	FC Tokyo U-23	0-3	Kataller Toyama	Ajinomoto Field Nishigaoka	2,206
5	2016.04.17	FC Tokyo U-23	1-1	Gamba Osaka U-23	Yumenoshima Stadium	1,993
6	2016.04.24	Gainare Tottori	0-1	FC Tokyo U-23	Tottori Bank Bird Stadium	1,464
7	2016.05.01	FC Tokyo U-23	1-1	Tochigi SC	Ajinomoto Field Nishigaoka	3,517
8	2016.05.08	YSCC Yokohama	1-0	FC Tokyo U-23	NHK Spring Mitsuzawa Football Stadium	878
9	2016.05.15	Oita Trinita	3-0	FC Tokyo U-23	Oita Bank Dome	6,232
10	2016.05.22	FC Tokyo U-23	0-0	Kagoshima United FC	Yumenoshima Stadium	2,192
11	2016.05.29	AC Nagano Parceiro	0-1	FC Tokyo U-23	Minami Nagano Sports Park Stadium	4,449
12	2016.06.12	FC Tokyo U-23	1-1	Fujieda MYFC	Ajinomoto Field Nishigaoka	1,777
13	2016.06.18	Cerezo Osaka U-23	2-1	FC Tokyo U-23	Kincho Stadium	1,337
14	2016.06.26	FC Tokyo U-23	1-0	Grulla Morioka	Ajinomoto Field Nishigaoka	1,937
15	2016.07.03	FC Tokyo U-23	1-1	Fukushima United FC	Komazawa Olympic Park Stadium	2,902
16	2016.07.10	Fujieda MYFC	2-1	FC Tokyo U-23	Fujieda Soccer Stadium	1,707
17	2016.07.16	FC Ryukyu	1-5	FC Tokyo U-23	Okinawa Athletic Park Stadium	1,146
18	2016.07.24	FC Tokyo U-23	1-2	Oita Trinita	Yumenoshima Stadium	2,452
19	2016.07.31	FC Tokyo U-23	0-1	Gainare Tottori	Ajinomoto Field Nishigaoka	1,375
20	2016.08.07	Tochigi SC	1-1	FC Tokyo U-23	Tochigi Green Stadium	5,145
21	2016.09.11	Grulla Morioka	1-1	FC Tokyo U-23	Iwagin Stadium	1,102
22	2016.09.19	FC Tokyo U-23	1-0	Blaublitz Akita	Ajinomoto Stadium	3,236
23	2016.09.25	Kagoshima United FC	1-0	FC Tokyo U-23	Kagoshima Kamoike Stadium	3,723
24	2016.10.02	FC Tokyo U-23	2-0	YSCC Yokohama	Ajinomoto Field Nishigaoka	1,443
25	2016.10.16	Kataller Toyama	0-0	FC Tokyo U-23	Toyama Stadium	5,081
26	2016.10.23	Gamba Osaka U-23	1-1	FC Tokyo U-23	Expo '70 Commemorative Stadium	1,257
27	2016.10.30	FC Tokyo U-23	4-1	SC Sagamihara	Ajinomoto Field Nishigaoka	2,813
28	2016.11.05	FC Tokyo U-23	1-2	AC Nagano Parceiro	Komazawa Olympic Park Stadium	7,653
29	2016.11.13	Fukushima United FC	0-2	FC Tokyo U-23	Toho Stadium	3,052
30	2016.11.20	FC Tokyo U-23	2-0	Cerezo Osaka U-23	Yumenoshima Stadium	2,877
