= 2017 SC Sagamihara season =

SC Sagamihara
2017 season
- Manager: Sotaro Yasunaga
- Stadium: Sagamihara Gion Stadium
- J3 League: 12th

2017 SC Sagamihara season.

== J3 League ==
=== League table ===
Pos	Team	Pld	W	D	L	GF	GA	GD	Pts
9	Giravanz Kitakyushu	32	13	7	12	44	37	+7	46
10	Fukushima United	32	13	4	15	39	43	−4	43
11	FC Tokyo U-23	32	12	7	13	36	47	−11	43
12	SC Sagamihara	32	9	12	11	34	41	−7	39
13	Cerezo Osaka U-23	32	8	11	13	39	43	−4	35
14	YSCC Yokohama	32	8	8	16	41	54	−13	32
15	Grulla Morioka	32	7	8	17	32	49	−17	29

Source: 2017 MEIJI YASUDA J3 LEAGUE League table
Rules for classification: 1) Points; 2) Goal difference; 3) Goals scored; 4th) head-to-head results; 5th) disciplinary points; 6th) draw

=== Match details ===
J3 League match details
Match	Date	Team	Score	Team	Venue	Attendance
1	2017.03.12	SC Sagamihara	0-1	AC Nagano Parceiro	Sagamihara Gion Stadium	5,562
2	2017.03.20	Gamba Osaka U-23	0-1	SC Sagamihara	Suita City Football Stadium	1,609
3	2017.03.25	FC Tokyo U-23	1-0	SC Sagamihara	Ajinomoto Field Nishigaoka	2,020
4	2017.04.01	SC Sagamihara	1-0	Giravanz Kitakyushu	Sagamihara Gion Stadium	1,548
5	2017.04.16	Fukushima United FC	1-1	SC Sagamihara	Toho Stadium	1,341
7	2017.05.07	SC Sagamihara	2-2	Azul Claro Numazu	Sagamihara Gion Stadium	6,015
8	2017.05.14	SC Sagamihara	1-1	Grulla Morioka	Sagamihara Gion Stadium	3,898
9	2017.05.20	FC Ryukyu	1-1	SC Sagamihara	Okinawa Athletic Park Stadium	1,968
10	2017.05.28	SC Sagamihara	1-0	Tochigi SC	Sagamihara Gion Stadium	3,362
11	2017.06.03	Kataller Toyama	2-0	SC Sagamihara	Toyama Stadium	3,138
12	2017.06.10	YSCC Yokohama	0-0	SC Sagamihara	NHK Spring Mitsuzawa Football Stadium	1,093
13	2017.06.18	SC Sagamihara	1-0	Fujieda MYFC	Sagamihara Gion Stadium	2,347
14	2017.06.25	Blaublitz Akita	1-0	SC Sagamihara	Akigin Stadium	2,301
15	2017.07.01	Cerezo Osaka U-23	2-2	SC Sagamihara	Kincho Stadium	754
16	2017.07.09	SC Sagamihara	1-1	Gainare Tottori	Sagamihara Gion Stadium	3,106
17	2017.07.16	SC Sagamihara	1-3	Kagoshima United FC	Sagamihara Gion Stadium	3,127
18	2017.07.22	Tochigi SC	1-0	SC Sagamihara	Tochigi Green Stadium	4,355
19	2017.08.20	SC Sagamihara	1-3	Cerezo Osaka U-23	Sagamihara Gion Stadium	6,122
20	2017.08.26	Gainare Tottori	1-2	SC Sagamihara	Tottori Bank Bird Stadium	2,009
21	2017.09.03	SC Sagamihara	2-1	Fukushima United FC	Sagamihara Gion Stadium	3,538
22	2017.09.10	AC Nagano Parceiro	1-0	SC Sagamihara	Minami Nagano Sports Park Stadium	3,669
24	2017.09.24	SC Sagamihara	1-2	YSCC Yokohama	Sagamihara Gion Stadium	2,920
25	2017.10.01	Giravanz Kitakyushu	3-0	SC Sagamihara	Mikuni World Stadium Kitakyushu	4,532
26	2017.10.08	SC Sagamihara	4-2	FC Ryukyu	Sagamihara Gion Stadium	2,338
27	2017.10.14	SC Sagamihara	1-1	Blaublitz Akita	Sagamihara Gion Stadium	1,673
28	2017.10.22	Fujieda MYFC	1-1	SC Sagamihara	Shizuoka Stadium	1,118
29	2017.10.29	SC Sagamihara	3-2	Kataller Toyama	Sagamihara Gion Stadium	3,090
30	2017.11.05	Azul Claro Numazu	0-0	SC Sagamihara	Ashitaka Park Stadium	2,911
31	2017.11.12	Grulla Morioka	0-2	SC Sagamihara	Iwagin Stadium	1,199
32	2017.11.19	SC Sagamihara	0-0	FC Tokyo U-23	Sagamihara Gion Stadium	5,259
33	2017.11.26	SC Sagamihara	2-2	Gamba Osaka U-23	Sagamihara Gion Stadium	4,612
34	2017.12.03	Kagoshima United FC	5-2	SC Sagamihara	Kagoshima Kamoike Stadium	4,394
