= Hwang Song-su =

North Korean footballer (born 1987)

Hwang Song-Su 황성수
Personal information
- Full name: Hwang Song-Su
- Date of birth: July 10, 1987 (age 39)
- Place of birth: Tokyo, Japan
- Height: 1.77 m (5 ft 9 1/2 in)
- Positions: Midfielder; forward

Team information
- Current team: Criacao Shinjuku
- Number: 6

Youth career
- 2003–2005: Tokyo Korean Junior and Senior High School
- 2006–2009: Korea University

Senior career*
Years	Team	Apps	(Gls)
2010–2012	Júbilo Iwata	0	(0)
2013–2015	Thespakusatsu Gunma	98	(1)
2016–2018	Oita Trinita	19	(0)
2019–	Criacao Shinjuku	65	(4)

International career
2012	North Korea	0	(0)
- * Club domestic league appearances and goals as of 7 January 2019

Hwang Song-Su (黄誠秀, 10 July 1987) is a footballer who plays for Criacao Shinjuku. Born in Japan, he represented the North Korea national team.

== Club statistics ==
Updated to 23 February 2019.

Club performance			League		Cup		League Cup		Total	
Season	Club	League	Apps	Goals	Apps	Goals	Apps	Goals	Apps	Goals
Japan			League		Emperor's Cup		J. League Cup		Total	
2010	Júbilo Iwata	J1 League	0	0	0	0	0	0	0	0
2011	Júbilo Iwata	J1 League	0	0	0	0	0	0	0	0
2012	Júbilo Iwata	J1 League	0	0	1	0	1	0	2	0
2013	Thespakusatsu; Gunma	J2 League	31	1	0	0	–		31	1
2014	Thespakusatsu; Gunma	J2 League	35	0	2	0	–		37	0
2015	Thespakusatsu; Gunma	J2 League	32	0	1	0	–		33	0
2016	Oita Trinita	J3 League	8	0	3	0	–		11	0
2017	Oita Trinita	J2 League	5	0	2	0	–		7	0
2018	Oita Trinita	J2 League	6	0	1	0	–		7	0
Total			117	1	10	0	1	0	129	1
