= Naoki Hatta =

Japanese footballer

Naoki Hatta 八田 直樹
Personal information
- Full name: Naoki Hatta
- Date of birth: 24 June 1986 (age 40)
- Place of birth: Ise, Mie, Japan
- Height: 1.85 m (6 ft 1 in)
- Position: Goalkeeper

Youth career
- 2002–2004: Júbilo Iwata Youth

Senior career*
Years	Team	Apps	(Gls)
2005–2023	Júbilo Iwata	157	(0)
Medal record
Júbilo Iwata
Winner	J.League Cup	2010
- * Club domestic league appearances and goals as of end of 2022 season

Naoki Hatta (八田 直樹, Hatta Naoki; born 24 June 1986 in Ise, Mie) is a retired Japanese footballer who played his whole career for Júbilo Iwata.

== Career statistics ==
Appearances and goals by club, season and competition
Club	Season	League			Emperor's Cup		J. League Cup		AFC		Total	
Club	Season	Division	Apps	Goals	Apps	Goals	Apps	Goals	Apps	Goals	Apps	Goals
Júbilo Iwata	2005	J1 League	0	0	0	0	0	0	0	0	0	0
Júbilo Iwata	2006	J1 League	0	0	0	0	0	0	–		0	0
Júbilo Iwata	2007	J1 League	0	0	0	0	0	0	–		0	0
Júbilo Iwata	2008	J1 League	1	0	0	0	0	0	–		1	0
Júbilo Iwata	2009	J1 League	8	0	3	0	2	0	–		13	0
Júbilo Iwata	2010	J1 League	18	0	2	0	7	0	–		27	0
Júbilo Iwata	2011	J1 League	0	0	1	0	2	0	–		3	0
Júbilo Iwata	2012	J1 League	32	0	0	0	4	0	–		36	0
Júbilo Iwata	2013	J1 League	13	0	1	0	5	0	–		19	0
Júbilo Iwata	2014	J2 League	35	0	2	0	0	0	–		37	0
Júbilo Iwata	2015	J2 League	1	0	2	0	0	0	–		3	0
Júbilo Iwata	2016	J1 League	4	0	2	0	4	0	–		10	0
Júbilo Iwata	2017	J1 League	2	0	0	0	2	0	–		4	0
Júbilo Iwata	2018	J1 League	0	0	1	0	0	0	–		1	0
Júbilo Iwata	2019	J1 League	8	0	2	0	0	0	–		10	0
Júbilo Iwata	2020	J2 League	27	0	0	0	0	0	–		27	0
Júbilo Iwata	2021	J2 League	5	0	1	0	0	0	–		6	0
Júbilo Iwata	2022	J1 league	0	0	–		–		–		0	0
Júbilo Iwata	2023	J2 League	1	0	–		–		–		1	0
Career total			157	0	17	0	26	0	0	0	200	0
