= Yusuke Inuzuka =

Japanese footballer

Personal information
- Full name: Yusuke Inuzuka
- Date of birth: December 13, 1983 (age 42)
- Place of birth: Hamamatsu, Japan
- Height: 1.78 m (5 ft 10 in)
- Position: Defender

Team information
- Current team: Kochi United FC
- Number: 10

Youth career
- 1999–2001: Júbilo Iwata
- 2002–2005: Shizuoka Sangyo University

Senior career*
Years	Team	Apps	(Gls)
2006–2010	Júbilo Iwata	80	(4)
2011	Ventforet Kofu	5	(1)
2012	Sagan Tosu	4	(0)
2013	Licata		
2014	Azul Claro Numazu	13	(1)
2015–	Kochi United FC	12	(1)
Total		114	(7)
Medal record
Júbilo Iwata
Winner	J.League Cup	2010
- * Club domestic league appearances and goals as of December 31, 2015

Yusuke Inuzuka (犬塚 友輔, Inuzuka Yūsuke; born December 13, 1983) is a Japanese football player.

== Club statistics ==
Club performance			League		Cup		League Cup		Total	
Season	Club	League	Apps	Goals	Apps	Goals	Apps	Goals	Apps	Goals
Japan			League		Emperor's Cup		J.League Cup		Total	
2002	Shizuoka Sangyo University	Football League	8	0	-		-		8	0
2006	Júbilo Iwata	J1 League	14	2	3	1	0	0	17	3
2007	Júbilo Iwata	J1 League	22	1	0	0	6	0	28	1
2008	Júbilo Iwata	J1 League	29	1	0	0	6	0	35	1
2009	Júbilo Iwata	J1 League	15	0	1	1	5	0	21	1
2010	Júbilo Iwata	J1 League								
Country	Japan		88	4	4	2	17	0	109	6
Total			88	4	4	2	17	0	109	6
