= Keisuke Funatani =

Japanese footballer

Keisuke Funatani 船谷 圭祐
Personal information
- Full name: Keisuke Funatani
- Date of birth: January 7, 1986 (age 40)
- Place of birth: Matsusaka, Mie, Japan
- Height: 1.74 m (5 ft 8 1/2 in)
- Position: Midfielder

Team information
- Current team: FC Maruyasu Okazaki
- Number: 30

Youth career
- 2001–2003: Júbilo Iwata

Senior career*
Years	Team	Apps	(Gls)
2004–2011	Júbilo Iwata	92	(4)
2008	→ Sagan Tosu (loan)	12	(1)
2012–2013	Sagan Tosu	2	(0)
2013–2018	Mito HollyHock	142	(11)
2019–	FC Maruyasu Okazaki	28	(2)
Total		276	(18)
Medal record
Júbilo Iwata
Winner	J.League Cup	2010
Runner-up	Emperor's Cup	2004
Representing Japan
AFC U-19 Championship
Bronze medal – third place	2004 Malaysia
- * Club domestic league appearances and goals as of 23 February 2020

Keisuke Funatani (船谷 圭祐, Funatani Keisuke; born January 7, 1986) is a Japanese football player.

== Club career ==
=== Mito HollyHock ===
Funatani left Mito HollyHock at the end of 2018. This was announced on 3 December 2018.

=== FC Maruyasu Okazaki ===
On 7 February 2019, Funatani joined FC Maruyasu Okazaki.

== National team career ==
In June 2005, Funatani was selected Japan U-20 national team for 2005 World Youth Championship. But he did not play in the match.

== Club statistics ==
Updated to 23 February 2020.

Club performance			League		Cup		League Cup		Continental		Total	
Season	Club	League	Apps	Goals	Apps	Goals	Apps	Goals	Apps	Goals	Apps	Goals
Japan			League		Emperor's Cup		J.League Cup		AFC		Total	
2004	Júbilo Iwata	J1 League	0	0	0	0	0	0	0	0	0	0
2005	Júbilo Iwata	J1 League	14	0	2	0	1	0	1	1	18	1
2006	Júbilo Iwata	J1 League	19	4	2	0	8	3	-		29	7
2007	Júbilo Iwata	J1 League	13	0	1	0	4	0	-		18	0
2008	Júbilo Iwata	J1 League	5	0	0	0	3	0	-		8	0
2008	Sagan Tosu	J2 League	12	1	4	1	-		-		16	2
2009	Júbilo Iwata	J1 League	10	0	2	1	0	0	-		12	1
2010	Júbilo Iwata	J1 League	25	0	2	0	6	1	-		33	1
2011	Júbilo Iwata	J1 League	6	0	2	0	3	0	-		11	0
2012	Sagan Tosu	J1 League	2	0	0	0	0	0	-		2	0
2013	Sagan Tosu	J1 League	0	0	0	0	3	0	-		3	0
2013	Mito HollyHock	J2 League	13	0	2	0	-		-		15	0
2014	Mito HollyHock	J2 League	40	4	2	0	-		-		42	4
2015	Mito HollyHock	J2 League	34	4	4	1	-		-		38	5
2016	Mito HollyHock	J2 League	33	2	2	0	-		-		35	2
2017	Mito HollyHock	J2 League	16	1	1	0	-		-		17	1
2018	Mito HollyHock	J2 League	6	0	1	0	-		-		7	0
2019	FC Maruyasu Okazaki	JFL	28	2	-		-		-		28	2
Career total			276	18	27	3	28	4	1	1	332	26
