= Kenichi Kaga =

Japanese footballer

Kenichi Kaga 加賀 健一
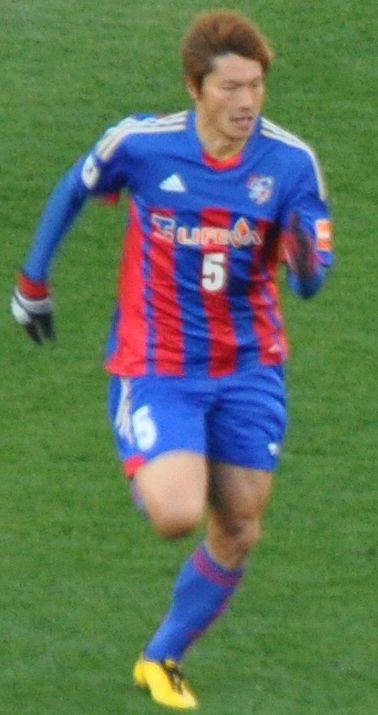

Personal information
- Full name: Kenichi Kaga
- Date of birth: 30 September 1983 (age 43)
- Place of birth: Katagami, Akita, Japan
- Height: 1.81 m (5 ft 11 1/2 in)
- Position: Defender

Youth career
- 1999–2001: Akita Commercial High School

Senior career*
Years	Team	Apps	(Gls)
2002–2011	Júbilo Iwata	111	(2)
2005–2006	→ Consadole Sapporo (loan)	75	(4)
2012–2014	FC Tokyo	42	(0)
2015–2016	Urawa Reds	5	(0)
2017–2019	Montedio Yamagata	48	(1)
2020–2024	Blaublitz Akita	42	(1)
Total		323	(8)

International career
2001	Japan U-18		
Medal record
Júbilo Iwata
Winner	J1 League	2002
Runner-up	J1 League	2003
Winner	J.League Cup	2010
Winner	Emperor's Cup	2003
Runner-up	Emperor's Cup	2004
Urawa Reds
Runner-up	J1 League	2016
Winner	J.League Cup	2016
Runner-up	Emperor's Cup	2015
- * Club domestic league appearances and goals

Kenichi Kaga (加賀 健一, Kaga Kenichi; born 30 September 1983) is a Japanese former footballer who played as a defender.

== Playing career ==
Kaga was born in Futada, Tennō, Akita on 30 September 1983. After graduating from high school, he joined J1 League club Júbilo Iwata in 2002. However, he struggled for minutes behind Hideto Suzuki, Makoto Tanaka and so on.

In 2005, Kaga was loaned to J2 League club Consadole Sapporo. He played as regular center back in 2 seasons. In 2007, he returned to Júbilo. He became a regular player as a center back. Although his opportunity to play decreased from 2009, he became a regular player again in 2011.

In 2012, he moved to FC Tokyo. Although he could not become a regular player, he played many matches as center back.

In 2015, he moved to Urawa Reds. However, he struggled for minutes.

In 2017, he moved to J2 club Montedio Yamagata.

At the end of the 2024 season, Kaga announced his retirement on social media.

== Club statistics ==
Appearances and goals by club, season and competition
Club	Season	League			National cup (Note: Includes Emperor's Cup)		League cup (Note: Includes J.League Cup)		Continental		Other		Total	
Club	Season	Division	Apps	Goals	Apps	Goals	Apps	Goals	Apps	Goals	Apps	Goals	Apps	Goals
Júbilo Iwata	2002	J.League Division 1	0	0	0	0	0	0	0	0	0	0	0	0
Júbilo Iwata	2003	J.League Division 1	0	0	0	0	0	0	0	0	0	0	0	0
Júbilo Iwata	2004	J.League Division 1	0	0	0	0	0	0	1 (Note: Appearances in AFC Champions League)	0	0	0	1	0
Júbilo Iwata	2007	J.League Division 1	30	2	2	0	4	0	0	0	0	0	36	2
Júbilo Iwata	2008	J.League Division 1	30	0	1	0	4	0	0	0	0	0	35	0
Júbilo Iwata	2009	J.League Division 1	9	0	0	0	4	0	0	0	0	0	13	0
Júbilo Iwata	2010	J.League Division 1	12	0	0	0	5	0	0	0	0	0	17	0
Júbilo Iwata	2011	J.League Division 1	30	0	1	0	3	1	0	0	1 (Note: Appearance in Suruga Bank Championship)	0	35	1
Júbilo Iwata	Total		111	2	4	0	20	1	1	0	1	0	137	3
Consadole Sapporo (loan)	2005	J.League Division 2	31	0	1	0	–		–		–		32	0
Consadole Sapporo (loan)	2006	J.League Division 2	44	4	5	1	–		–		–		49	5
Consadole Sapporo (loan)	Total		75	4	6	1	0	0	0	0	0	0	81	5
FC Tokyo	2012	J.League Division 1	17	0	1	0	2	0	3	0	0	0	23	0
FC Tokyo	2013	J.League Division 1	18	0	3	0	6	0	0	0	0	0	27	0
FC Tokyo	2014	J.League Division 1	7	0	0	0	2	0	0	0	0	0	9	0
FC Tokyo	Total		42	0	4	0	10	0	3	0	0	0	59	0
Urawa Red Diamonds	2015	J1 League	4	0	1	0	0	0	3	0	0	0	8	0
Urawa Red Diamonds	2016	J1 League	1	0	0	0	2	0	0	0	0	0	3	0
Urawa Red Diamonds	Total		5	0	1	0	2	0	3	0	0	0	11	0
Montedio Yamagata	2017	J2 League	20	1	0	0	–		–		0	0	20	1
Montedio Yamagata	2018	J2 League	15	0	0	0	–		–		0	0	15	0
Montedio Yamagata	2019	J2 League	13	0	0	0	–		–		0	0	13	0
Montedio Yamagata	Total		48	1	0	0	0	0	0	0	0	0	48	1
Blaublitz Akita	2020	J3 League	11	0	1	0	–		–		–		12	0
Blaublitz Akita	2021	J2 League	17	1	0	0	–		–		–		17	1
Blaublitz Akita	2022	J2 League	9	0	0	0	–		–		–		9	0
Blaublitz Akita	2023	J2 League	4	0	1	0	–		–		–		5	0
Blaublitz Akita	2024	J2 League	1	0	1	0	2	0	–		–		4	0
Blaublitz Akita	Total		42	1	3	0	2	0	0	0	0	0	47	1
Career total			323	8	18	1	34	1	7	0	1	0	383	10

== Honours ==
Blaublitz Akita

- J3 League (1): 2020
