= Gilsinho (footballer, born 1984) =

Brazilian footballer

Personal information
- Full name: Gilson do Amaral
- Date of birth: April 4, 1984 (age 42)
- Place of birth: Américo Brasiliense, Brazil
- Height: 1.68 m (5 ft 6 in)
- Position: Striker

Team information
- Current team: Vila Nova
- Number: 11

Senior career*
Years	Team	Apps	(Gls)
2003	Marília		
2003	Ituano		
2004	São Bento		
2005	América		
2006	Ituano	35	(7)
2007	Paulista	21	(8)
2008–2011	Júbilo Iwata	98	(25)
2012	Corinthians	3	(0)
2012–2013	Sport	22	(2)
2013–2014	Ventforet Kofu	41	(1)
2015	Audax	0	(0)
2015	FC Gifu	14	(1)
2016	Atlético Goianiense	32	(3)
2017	Avispa Fukuoka	30	(3)
2018	Mirassol	0	(0)
2018	→ Ferroviária (loan)	5	(0)
2018	→ Botafogo-SP (loan)	4	(0)
2019	Atlético Goianiense	11	(0)
2020–2021	Vila Nova	20	(0)
2021	São José	10	(1)
- * Club domestic league appearances and goals

Gilson do Amaral (born April 4, 1984), commonly known as Gilsinho, is a Brazilian former footballer who played as a striker.

== Career ==
Gilsinho's early career was spent at clubs in São Paulo state, such as Marília, Ituano and Paulista. After a successful Campeonato Paulista campaign with the latter in 2017, during which he scored 8 goals, he signed with Júbilo Iwata from Brazilian club Paulista. The deal was initially a year's loan, with an option to make it permanent. The move was later made permanent, with Gilsinho penning a new contract with Júbilo. He was a regular starter in his four seasons stay, helping the club to the 2010 J. League Cup.

Corinthians signed Gilsinho ahead of the 2012 season. In July 2012 he moved to Sport Recife to play 2012 Campeonato Brasileiro Série A

On 12 July 2013, Gilsinho joined J1 League club Ventforet Kofu, replacing Paraguayan striker José Ortigoza. He returned to Brazil in 2015, joining up with former team-mate from Paulista Fernando Diniz, who was now coach of Audax At the end of the Campeonato Paulista season he returned to Japan with J2 League side FC Gifu, but didn't make much impact, being released at the end of the year.

He returned home to Brazil again at the start of 2016, signing with Atlético Goianiense for a season which culminated in winning the 2016 Campeonato Brasileiro Série B.

For the 2017 season, Gilsinho once again took a contract in Japan, with J2 League side Avispa Fukuoka.

In 2018 Gilsinho played with Mirassol in Campeonato Paulista, moving to Ferroviária to play in Série D until their early exit from the competition, at which point he signed for Botafogo-SP, playing a small part in their promotion from Série C. He signed for a second spell with Atlético Goianiense for the 2019 season.

== Club statistics ==
As of 4 May 2019

career in Brazil
Club	Season	Division	League		State League		Copa do Brasil		Other		Total	
Club	Season	Division	Apps	Goals	Apps	Goals	Apps	Goals	Apps	Goals	Apps	Goals
Paulista	2007	Série B	?	8	?	?	—		—		?	?
Corinthians	2012	Série A	3	0	13	1	0	0	0	0	16	1
Sport Recife	2012	Série A	22	2	—		—		—		2	2
Sport Recife	2013	Série A	0	0	2	0	1	0	2 (Note: Appearances in 2013 Copa do Nordeste)	0	5	0
Audax	2015	Paulista	—		13	0	—		—		13	0
Atlético Goianiense	2016	Série B	32	3	7	0	1	0	—		40	3
Mirassol	2018	Paulista	—		13	0	—		—		13	0
Ferroviária	2018	Série D	5	0	—		—		—		5	0
Botafogo-SP	2018	Série C	4	0	—		—		—		4	0
Atlético Goianiense	2019	Série B	1	0	16	3	4	0	—		20	3
Career total in Brazil			68	13	64	4	6	0	2	0	140	17
Career in Japan
Club	Season	Division	League		Emperor's Cup		J.League Cup		Other (Note: Includes 2008 J1-J2 Playoff and Suruga Bank Championship)		Total	
Club	Season	Division	Apps	Goals	Apps	Goals	Apps	Goals	Apps	Goals	Apps	Goals
Júbilo Iwata	2008	J.League Division 1	30	9	0	0	6	3	2	0	38	12
Júbilo Iwata	2009	J.League Division 1	18	7	0	0	4	0	—		22	7
Júbilo Iwata	2010	J.League Division 1	21	6	2	0	9	5	—		32	11
Júbilo Iwata	2011	J.League Division 1	29	3	1	0	5	1	1	0	36	4
Ventforet Kofu	2013	J.League Division 1	16	0	3	0	—		—		19	0
Ventforet Kofu	2014	J. League Division 1	25	1	2	0	1	0	—		28	1
FC Gifu	2015	J2 League	14	1	0	0	—		—		14	1
Avispa Fukuoka	2017	J2 League	30	3	0	0	—		—		0	0
Career total in Japan			183	30	8	0	25	9	3	0	219	39
