= Ryu Okada =

Japanese footballer (born 1984)

Personal information
- Full name: Ryu Okada
- Date of birth: 10 April 1984 (age 42)
- Place of birth: Fujieda, Shizuoka, Japan
- Height: 1.70 m (5 ft 7 in)
- Position: Defender

Team information
- Current team: Júbilo Iwata
- Number: 19

Youth career
- 2003–2006: Tsukuba University

Senior career*
Years	Team	Apps	(Gls)
2007–	Júbilo Iwata	45	(1)
2012–2013	→ Avispa Fukuoka (loan)	59	(0)
Medal record
Júbilo Iwata
Winner	J.League Cup	2010
- * Club domestic league appearances and goals as of 23 February 2016

Ryu Okada (岡田 隆, Okada Ryu; born 10 April 1984 in Fujieda) is a Japanese footballer, who currently plays for Júbilo Iwata on loan from Jubilo Iwata.

== Career statistics ==
Updated to 23 February 2016.

Appearances and goals by club, season and competition
Club	Season	League			Emperor's Cup		J.League Cup		Total	
Club	Season	Division	Apps	Goals	Apps	Goals	Apps	Goals	Apps	Goals
Júbilo Iwata	2007	J1 League	0	0	0	0	2	0	2	0
Júbilo Iwata	2008	J1 League	5	0	1	0	1	0	7	0
Júbilo Iwata	2009	J1 League	14	1	3	0	3	0	20	1
Júbilo Iwata	2010	J1 League	8	0	2	0	6	0	16	0
Júbilo Iwata	2011	J1 League	4	0	1	0	2	0	7	0
Avispa Fukuoka	2012	J2 League	25	0	1	0	-		26	0
Avispa Fukuoka	2013	J2 League	34	0	1	0	-		35	0
Júbilo Iwata	2014	J2 League	14	0	3	0	-		17	0
Júbilo Iwata	2015	J2 League	0	0	2	0	-		2	0
Career total			104	1	14	0	14	0	132	1
