= Takuya Matsuura =

Japanese footballer

Takuya Matsuura 松浦 拓弥
Personal information
- Full name: Takuya Matsuura
- Date of birth: December 21, 1988 (age 37)
- Place of birth: Hamamatsu, Shizuoka, Japan
- Height: 1.66 m (5 ft 5 in)
- Position: Midfielder

Team information
- Current team: FC Osaka
- Number: 77

Youth career
- 2004–2006: Hamana High School

Senior career*
Years	Team	Apps	(Gls)
2007–2018	Júbilo Iwata	211	(17)
2011	→ Avispa Fukuoka (loan)	32	(3)
2019–2022	Yokohama FC		(17)
2023–	FC Osaka		(12)
Medal record
Júbilo Iwata
Winner	J.League Cup	2010
- * Club domestic league appearances and goals as of 29 December 2018

Takuya Matsuura (松浦 拓弥, Matsuura Takuya; born December 21, 1988 in Hamamatsu, Shizuoka) is a Japanese football player currently playing for FC Osaka.

== Career ==
He has mainly played as a left winger, but is known to cut inside and can slot into a more central role. Matsuura has also been known to take on defenders in one-on-one situations.

== Career statistics ==
Updated to 1 March 2019.

Club performance			League		Cup		League Cup		Total	
Season	Club	League	Apps	Goals	Apps	Goals	Apps	Goals	Apps	Goals
Japan			League		Emperor's Cup		League Cup		Total	
2007	Júbilo Iwata	J1 League	0	0	0	0	0	0	0	0
2008	Júbilo Iwata	J1 League	11	1	0	0	3	0	14	1
2009	Júbilo Iwata	J1 League	10	0	3	0	1	0	14	0
2010	Júbilo Iwata	J1 League	10	0	3	0	2	0	15	0
2011	Avispa Fukuoka	J1 League	32	3	2	1	2	0	36	3
2012	Júbilo Iwata	J1 League	26	3	2	0	5	2	33	5
2013	Júbilo Iwata	J1 League	26	2	0	0	5	1	31	3
2014	Júbilo Iwata	J2 League	19	1	2	0	–		21	1
2015	Júbilo Iwata	J2 League	26	3	2	0	–		28	3
2016	Júbilo Iwata	J1 League	26	1	3	0	5	0	34	1
2017	Júbilo Iwata	J1 League	26	3	4	0	2	0	32	3
2018	Júbilo Iwata	J1 League	31	3	2	1	4	2	37	6
Career total			243	20	23	2	29	5	295	26
