= Kota Ueda =

Japanese footballer

Kota Ueda 上田 康太
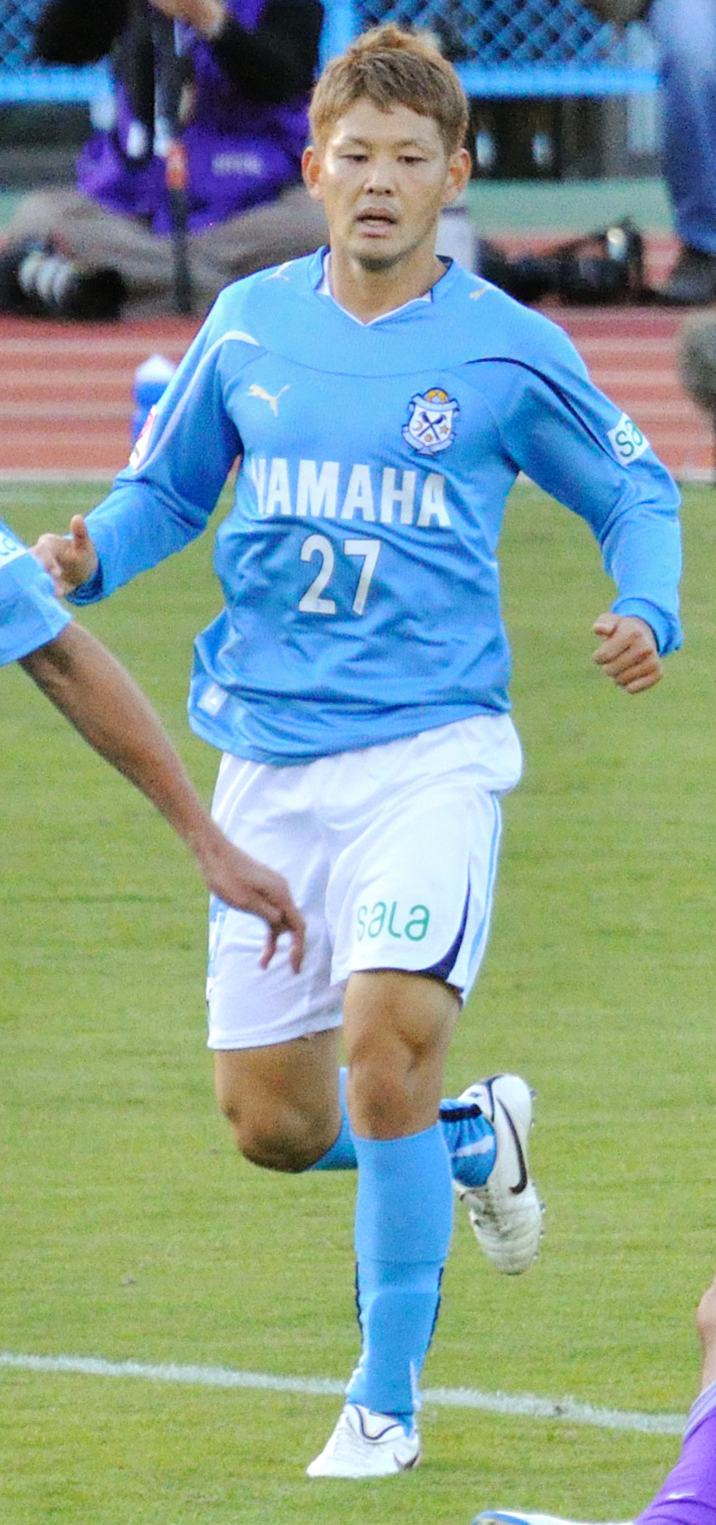

Personal information
- Full name: Kota Ueda
- Date of birth: May 9, 1986 (age 40)
- Place of birth: Ōme, Tokyo, Japan
- Height: 1.74 m (5 ft 9 in)
- Position: Midfielder

Youth career
- 1999–2001: Kashiwa Reysol Ōme
- 2002–2004: Júbilo Iwata Youth

Senior career*
Years	Team	Apps	(Gls)
2005–2010	Júbilo Iwata	118	(7)
2011–2014	Omiya Ardija	54	(1)
2014	→ Fagiano Okayama (loan)	35	(2)
2015–2017	Júbilo Iwata	67	(4)
2018–2020	Fagiano Okayama	112	(11)
2020–2021	Tochigi SC	1q	(0)
2021–2023	Criacao Shinjuku	46	(2)
Total		443	(27)
Medal record
Júbilo Iwata
Winner	J.League Cup	2010
- * Club domestic league appearances and goals

Kota Ueda (上田 康太, Ueda Kota; born May 9, 1986 in Ōme, Tokyo) is a Japanese former footballer who played as a midfielder.

== Club statistics ==
Appearances and goals by club, season and competition
Club	Season	League			National cup (Note: Includes Emperors Cup)		League cup (Note: Includes J.League Cup)		Total	
Club	Season	Division	Apps	Goals	Apps	Goals	Apps	Goals	Apps	Goals
Júbilo Iwata	2005	J.League Division 1	0	0	0	0	0	0	0	0
Júbilo Iwata	2006	J.League Division 1	20	2	3	0	0	0	23	2
Júbilo Iwata	2007	J.League Division 1	31	3	2	0	5	1	38	4
Júbilo Iwata	2008	J.League Division 1	25	1	0	0	4	0	29	1
Júbilo Iwata	2009	J.League Division 1	16	0	2	0	2	0	20	0
Júbilo Iwata	2010	J.League Division 1	26	1	2	0	10	1	38	2
Júbilo Iwata	Total		118	7	9	0	21	2	148	9
Omiya Ardija	2011	J.League Division 1	31	1	1	1	2	0	34	2
Omiya Ardija	2012	J.League Division 1	12	0	3	1	4	0	19	1
Omiya Ardija	2013	J.League Division 1	11	0	2	0	6	0	19	0
Omiya Ardija	Total		54	1	6	2	12	0	72	3
Fagiano Okayama (loan)	2014	J.League Division 2	35	2	0	0	–		35	2
Júbilo Iwata	2015	J2 League	36	2	0	0	0	0	36	2
Júbilo Iwata	2016	J1 League	18	1	1	0	5	0	24	1
Júbilo Iwata	2017	J1 League	13	1	4	1	5	0	22	2
Júbilo Iwata	Total		67	4	5	1	10	0	82	5
Fagiano Okayama	2018	J2 League	40	3	0	0	–		40	3
Fagiano Okayama	2019	J2 League	31	4	0	0	–		31	4
Fagiano Okayama	2020	J2 League	41	4	0	0	–		41	4
Fagiano Okayama	Total		112	11	0	0	0	0	112	11
Tochigi SC	2021	J2 League	11	0	2	0	–		13	0
Criacao Shinjuku	2022	JFL	27	1	0	0	–		27	1
Criacao Shinjuku	2023	JFL	19	1	1	0	–		20	1
Criacao Shinjuku	Total		46	2	1	0	0	0	47	2
Career total			443	27	23	3	43	2	509	32
