= Júbilo Iwata =

Japanese football club

Júbilo Iwata ジュビロ磐田
- Full name: Júbilo Iwata
- Nickname: Júbilo
- Founded: 1972; 54 years ago as Yamaha Motor S.C.
- Stadium: Yamaha Stadium; Iwata, Shizuoka
- Capacity: 15,165
- Owner: Yamaha Motor Company
- Chairman: Yoshirou Takahira
- Manager: Tadahiro Akiba
- League: J2 League
- 2025: J2 League, 5th of 20
- Website: www.jubilo-iwata.co.jp
Home colours	Away colours

Júbilo Iwata (Japanese: ジュビロ磐田, Hepburn: Jubiro Iwata) is a Japanese professional football team based in Iwata, located in Shizuoka Prefecture. The club competes in J2 League following relegation from J1 League in 2024.

== History ==
=== Origins and rise to the top (1972–1996) ===
The team started out as the company team for Yamaha Motor Corporation in April 1972. After making its way through the Shizuoka and Tōkai football leagues, it played in the Japan Soccer League until it reorganized as the J.League at the end of 1992.

Their first glory happened when they won both the Emperor's Cup and promotion as champions of the JSL Division 2 in 1982. They won their first Japanese league title in the 1987/88 season. Due to problems in the upcoming professionalization, Yamaha decided to relegate themselves and not be one of the J.League founder members.

They finished in 2nd place of the JFL 1st division, a division below the top flight, in 1993 and were promoted to the J1 league for 1994. The team welcomed Marius Johan (Hans) Ooft as its manager, as well as the Brazil national team captain Dunga and a number of foreign players to build a winning team. Dunga's football philosophy deeply influenced the club, initially as a player and currently as an advisor.

=== Glory years (1997–2003) ===
In a seven-year period between 1997 and 2003, the club won a number of titles relying on Japanese players instead of foreigners who may leave on a transfer during the middle of the season. Within this period Júbilo won the J.League title three times, finished second three more and won each of the domestic cup competitions once. In 1999, Júbilo were also crowned Champions of Asia after winning the final match against Esteghlal in front of 121,000 spectators at the Azadi Stadium.

In one of the most fruitful periods in J.League history, Júbilo broke several records and created some new ones. Amongst these are the most goals scored in a season (107 in 1998); the fewest goals conceded in a season (26 in 2001); the biggest goal difference (plus 68 goals in 1998); and the largest win (9–1 against Cerezo Osaka in 1998). In 2002, the team won both stages of the championship, a first in J.League history, and the same year the team had a record seven players selected for the J.League Team of the Year. All of these records still stand today.

Between 1997 and 2003, Júbilo were one of the most successful teams in the J. League. Over this seven-year spell Jubilo finished outside the top two of J1 just once, winning the league title on three occasions. This period also saw a number of cup final appearances, including winning the Emperor's Cup, the J. League Cup, and the Asian Champions League once each.

=== Post-glory years (2003–2015) ===
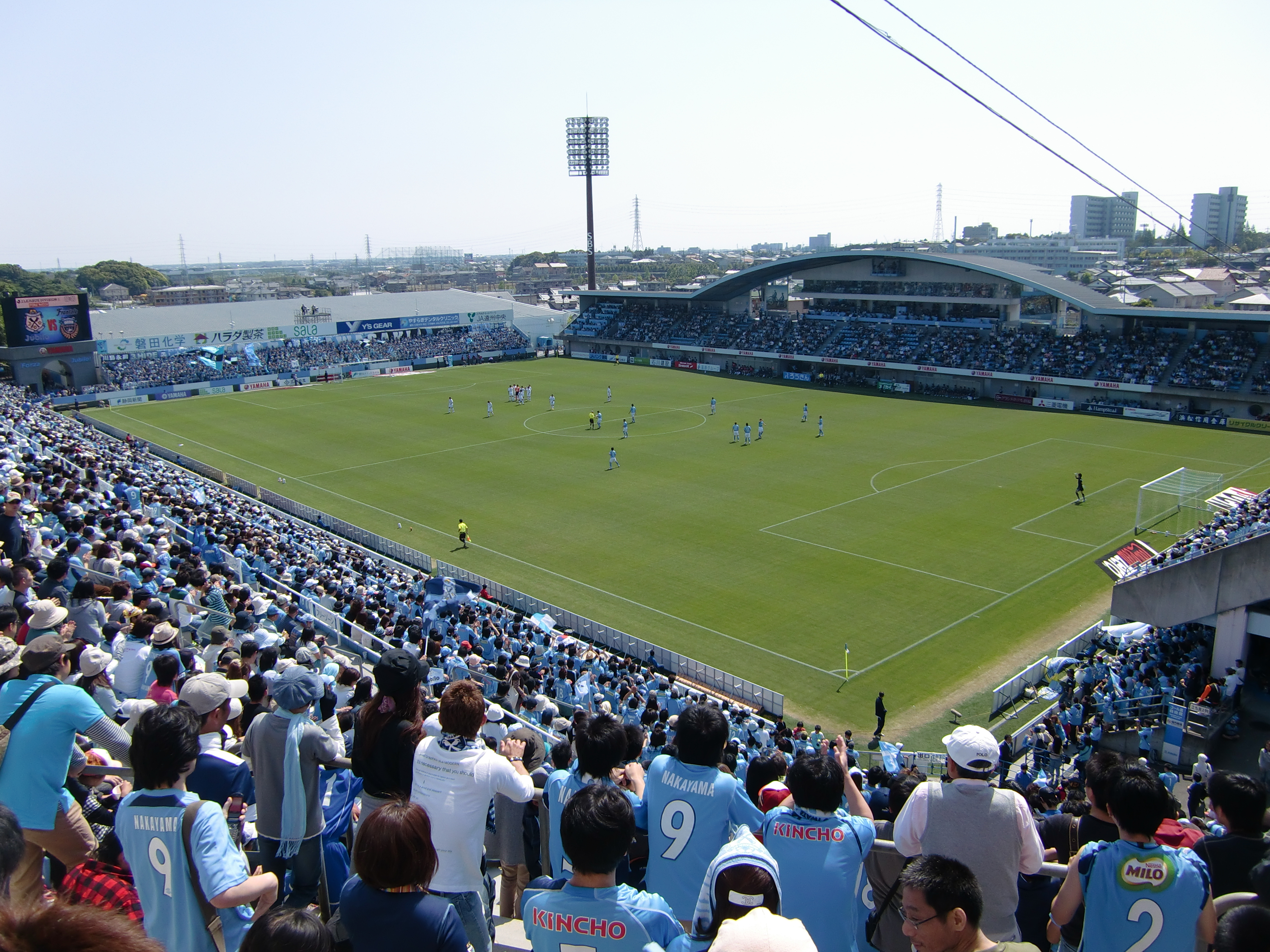
Yamaha Stadium Júbilo Iwata

Since their last cup triumph in the 2003 Emperor's Cup, the squad which took them to such heights began to age. Without similarly skilled replacements coming through the youth team or from outside, Júbilo's power started to fade, and in 2007 the club ended the season in a record worst position of 9th. Perhaps more concerning to Júbilo supporters is their eclipse in recent seasons by bitter local rivals Shimizu S-Pulse who, in ending the season above Júbilo every year since 2006, have become Shizuoka prefecture's premier performing team. In 2008, they finished 16th out of 18 – their lowest position in the 18-club table – but kept their J1 position by defeating Vegalta Sendai in the promotion/relegation playoff.

In 2013 season, it took them until 8th week to make their first win in the league matches, and never move up higher than 16th since they were ranked down to 17th as of the end of 5th week. Then eventually suffered their first relegation to 2014 J.League Division 2 after they were defeated by Sagan Tosu at their 31st week match. Júbilo were promoted back to J1 in 2015 after finishing runners-up.

=== Yo-yo era (2019–present) ===
After an 18th-place finish in 2019, Iwata were relegated to J2 for 2020. The following year, Júbilo won J2 and were promoted for the 2022 J1 League season.

In 2022, Júbilo couldn't find their way into success throughout the season, with forgettable campaigns being made in each competition. In the J.League Cup, the team saw an early elimination at the group stage, finishing third at their group after losing half of their fixtures. In the Emperor's Cup, they were eliminated in the Round of 16 by Tokyo Verdy at extra-time, despite looking promising after 5–2 win against Matsumoto Yamaga on the 2nd round.

On 19 October 2022, Júbilo Iwata announced through their media accounts that for both transfers windows of the 2023 season, the club would be unable to make new signings after a ban was imposed by FIFA and the CAS. The ban, however, didn't applied to youth team promotions of Júbilo's academy system, and for players returning from loan transfers. The decision was made based on issues regarding Fabián González's contract with the club, as the player supposedly cancelled a contract signed with an unnamed Thai club without a justifiable reason. According to Júbilo, at the time of his signing (in the pre-season) they were unaware of the previous contract González signed with the Thai club. The situation became public after the Thai club left a complaint highlighting the transfer issue situation to FIFA's Dispute Resolution Chamber in April 2022. González was also imposed a punishment by FIFA, being suspended from any participation in official matches for four months. The transfer ban also led to a provisional contract cancellation of Shu Morooka on 17 November 2022, who had during the season signed a provisional contract for the 2023 season, after graduating from university. Then, on the same day, it was announced he would join Kashima Antlers instead. Later, on 20 December, the club filed an appeal about the CAS decision over the subject, but it was denied on 22 December.

The situation in J1 became much worse for the club, spending the last 16 rounds of the top-flight league without leaving relegation zone, resulted another drop to J2 League for 2023 season, which confirmed on the penultimate round. Nonetheless, just a year later, Iwata eventually made a swift return to J1 for the 2024 season by finishing as runners-up of the second-tier, obtained a 2–1 away win in the final matchweek of the season against Tochigi SC on 12 November 2023 and favoured by results of another matches in the same day. On 1 March 2024, Ryo Germain scored 4 goals in a memorable 5–4 league away win against Kawasaki Frontale.

== Team image ==
=== Name origin ===
The team's name Júbilo means 'joy' in Spanish and Portuguese.

=== Rivalries ===
The fiercest professional rivals of Júbilo Iwata are Shimizu S-Pulse from Shizuoka. The club also have rivalries with both Kashima Antlers and Yokohama Marinos, with whom they traded the Japanese league championship since the late 1980s. During the Japan Soccer League days, they had a more local derby with Honda, across the Tenryu in Hamamatsu, but as Honda has long resisted professionalism, competitive matches between them since 1994 are a rarity. Júbilo also competed with another Shizuoka club, Fujieda MYFC in 2014 Emperor's Cup as well as 2023 J2 League, all won by Iwata side. On J3 League, there are Azul Claro Numazu, although neither clubs have ever faced one another in a competitive match.

=== In popular culture ===
In the manga series Captain Tsubasa, three characters were players of Júbilo Iwata. The midfielders Taro Misaki and Hanji Urabe, and the defender Ryo Ishizaki.

== Stadium ==
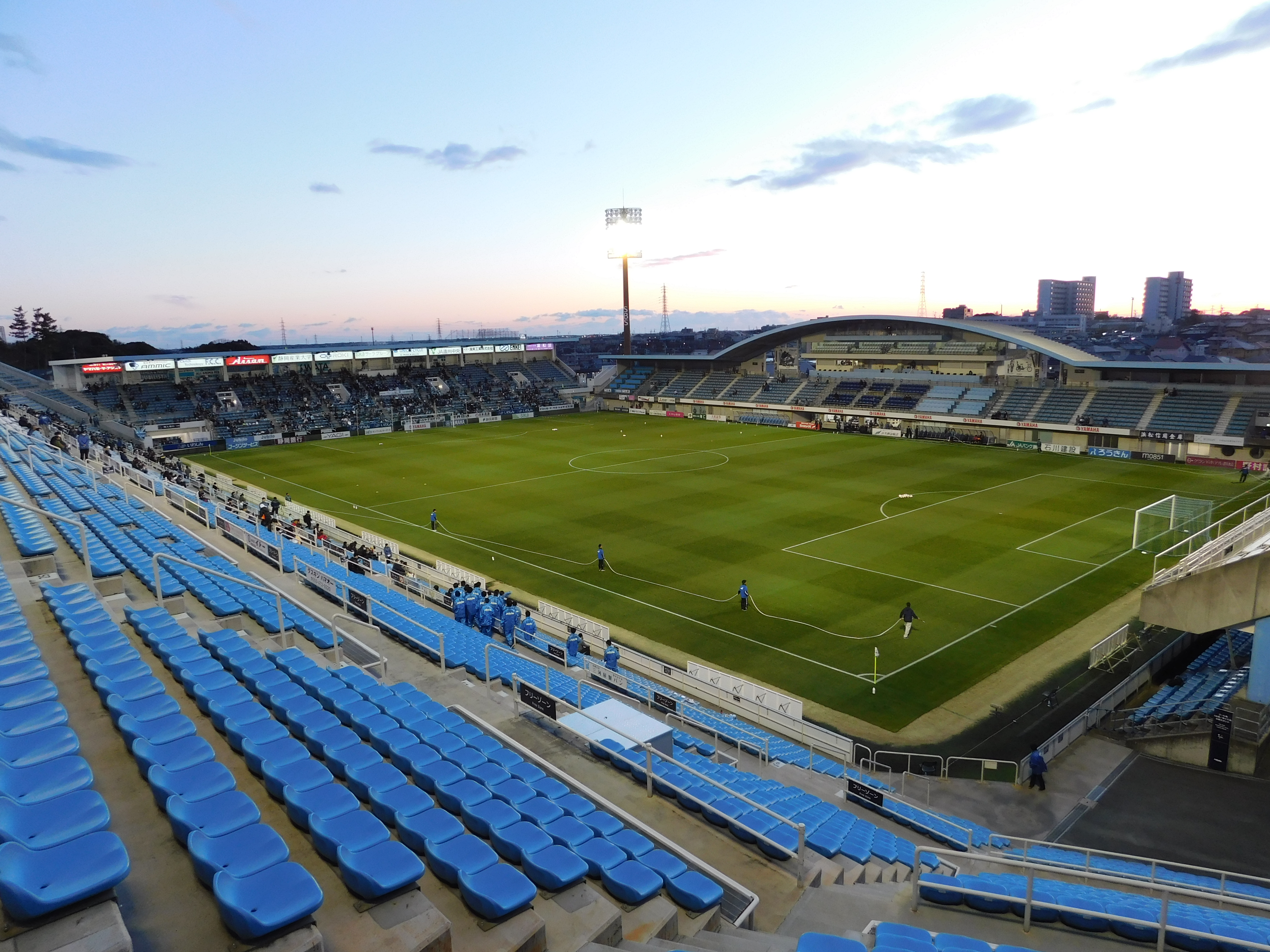
Yamaha Stadium

Júbilo plays their home games at the Yamaha Stadium. The stadium has a seating capacity of 15,165 people. It is one of the few dedicated football stadiums in Japan that are operated and managed by the club. It is said to be the easiest place to watch a game in Japan.

For big fixtures such as the Shizuoka derby with Shimizu S-Pulse and against some of the top teams in J1, Júbilo would play at the much larger Ecopa Stadium in Fukuroi City, a venue built specifically for the 2002 FIFA World Cup finals. The stadium surrounded by the rich nature of Mt. Ogasa and full of greenery, is the largest multi-purpose stadium in the prefecture, boasting a fully equipped facility that can accommodate 50,000 people.

Júbilo use both Okubo Ground in Iwata and Iwata Sports Park Yumeria as training grounds.

== Kit suppliers and shirt sponsors ==
=== Kit evolution ===
Home kits 1st
1994 - 1996	1997	1998 - 1999	2000 - 2001	2002
2003	2004	2005	2006	2007
2008	2009	2010 - 2011	2012	2013
2014	2015	2016	2017	2018
2019	2020	2021	2022	2023
2024	2025			

Away kits 2nd
1994 - 1996	1997	1998 - 1999	2000 - 2001	2002
2003	2004	2005	2006	2007
2008	2009	2010 - 2011	2012	2013
2014	2015	2016	2017	2018
2019	2020	2021	2022	2023
2024 -	2025 -			

Third kits
2003; 3rd	2005; Friendly match	2013; 20 Anniversary; 3rd	2016; Midsummer decisive battle	2017; Midsummer challenge
2017; 3rd	2018; Limited	2019; Summer Night; Challenge	2020; Limited	2021; Limited
2023; 30th Anniversary	2024; 3rd	2025; 3rd		

== Players ==
=== First-team squad ===
As of 10 September 2026.

Note: Flags indicate national team as defined under FIFA eligibility rules; some limited exceptions apply. Players may hold more than one non-FIFA nationality.

No.	Pos.	Nation	Player
1	GK	JPN	Eiji Kawashima (Co-captain)
2	DF	BRA	Danilo Cardoso
4	DF	JPN	Ko Matsubara (vice-captain)
5	DF	JPN	Takuro Ezaki
6	MF	JPN	Daiki Kaneko
7	MF	JPN	Rikiya Uehara (vice-captain)
8	MF	JPN	Hirotaka Tameda
9	FW	JPN	Ryo Watanabe (vice-captain)
11	FW	BRA	Matheus Peixoto
14	MF	JPN	Motoki Ohara (on loan from Sanfrecce Hiroshima)
15	MF	BRA	Yuri Lara
16	GK	JPN	Ayumi Niekawa
17	MF	JPN	Kento Nishioka ^{Type 2}
18	MF	JPN	Shion Inoue
19	FW	JPN	Leon Nozawa (on loan from FC Tokyo)
20	DF	JPN	Daisuke Katō
21	GK	JPN	Ryuki Miura
22	DF	JPN	Katsunori Ueebisu
23	FW	JPN	Takashi Inui
25	MF	JPN	Naoya Koike ^{DSP}

No.	Pos.	Nation	Player
26	DF	JPN	Shunsuke Nishikubo
29	DF	JPN	Kota Kuwabara ^{DSP}
30	DF	JPN	Kosuke Yamazaki (vice-captain)
31	FW	BRA	Iago Teles (on loan from (Brazil) Londrina)
32	FW	JPN	Ryunosuke Ota (on loan from Fagiano Okayama)
33	MF	JPN	Tokumo Kawai
34	DF	JPN	Yua Kai
36	DF	JPN	Ryusei Yoshimura
37	DF	JPN	Ikki Kawasaki
42	MF	JPN	Rea Ishizuka
47	MF	JPN	Daiki Sato
48	MF	JPN	Yuki Aida
50	MF	JPN	Hiroto Uemura
51	GK	JPN	Keitaro Nakajima
56	MF	JPN	Yuma Okuda ^{Type 2}
58	DF	JPN	Hinata Nishino ^{Type 2}
66	DF	JPN	Sora Masuda
77	MF	JPN	Kensuke Fujiwara
99	FW	BRA	João Victor (on loan from (Portugal) Berço SC)

=== Out on loan ===
Note: Flags indicate national team as defined under FIFA eligibility rules; some limited exceptions apply. Players may hold more than one non-FIFA nationality.

No.	Pos.	Nation	Player
13	GK	JPN	Koto Abe (at Cerezo Osaka)
28	GK	JPN	Tsubasa Nishizawa (at Zweigen Kanazawa)
—	FW	JPN	Ryoga Sato (at Fagiano Okayama)

No.	Pos.	Nation	Player
—	GK	JPN	Mitsuki Sugimoto (at Giravanz Kitakyushu)
—	DF	KOR	Park Se-gi (at Okinawa SV)

=== Júbilo Iwata U-18 ===
As of 29 April 2026

Below are list of U-18 team players belong to Júbilo Iwata academy that competing in 2026 Prince Takamado U-18 Premier League, the top-flight league for U-18 team of football clubs and senior high school football teams in the country. Only registered players for the competition will be displayed.

Note: Flags indicate national team as defined under FIFA eligibility rules; some limited exceptions apply. Players may hold more than one non-FIFA nationality.

No.	Pos.	Nation	Player
1	GK	JPN	Haruto Sakakibara
2	DF	JPN	Kokoro Ito
3	DF	JPN	Shunsuke Mizuno
4	MF	JPN	Yuya Kikuchi
5	DF	JPN	Kōma Hiraiwa
6	MF	JPN	Tomoki Takeyama
7	MF	JPN	Rui Honda
8	MF	JPN	Sōga Ōba
9	FW	JPN	Koki Hattori
10	MF	JPN	Kento Nishioka (captain)
11	MF	JPN	Renshin Takaoka
12	MF	JPN	Rikuto Masui
13	MF	JPN	Otarō Nakaya
14	MF	JPN	Sakutaro Koeda
15	DF	JPN	Hinata Nishino
17	DF	JPN	Nozomu Kagehara
18	FW	JPN	Ibuki Nishimura
19	DF	JPN	Kōta Yamamoto
20	FW	JPN	Takaya Arakawa

No.	Pos.	Nation	Player
21	GK	JPN	Mizuki Haji
22	DF	JPN	Rinto Matsushima
23	MF	JPN	Keishi Morishita
24	MF	JPN	Sakunosuke Shirahama
25	FW	JPN	Arata Kuromori
26	MF	JPN	Kotaro Tomihara
27	DF	JPN	Kai Koyama
28	MF	JPN	Shinki Sakuma
29	DF	JPN	Ryuta Fujii
30	MF	JPN	Jinnosuke Fujimoto
31	GK	JPN	Takumu Torii
32	FW	JPN	Sosuke Nishikawa
33	DF	JPN	Tōma Muramatsu
34	FW	JPN	Kō Igawa
35	MF	JPN	Shinta Agata
36	FW	JPN	Yuma Okuda
37	DF	JPN	Taishi Okaue
41	GK	JPN	Taiga Miyamoto

== Management and staff ==
As of 20 October 2026.

Position	Name
Manager	(Japan) Tadahiro Akiba
Head coach	(Japan) Chikara Fujimoto
Coach	(Japan) Tatsuya Masushima
Coach	(South Korea) Kim Byeom-yong
Goalkeeping coach	(Japan) Yoshikatsu Kawaguchi
Physical coach	(Japan) Kentaro Chuman
Physical coach	(Japan) Ryosuke Inada
Technical staff	(Japan) Takashi Harada
Technical staff	(Japan) Kiyotaka Sakai
Executive officer	(Japan) Takehisa Ohtomo
Operations officer	(Japan) Kaito Takahashi
Press officer	(Japan) Kosuke Ikemura

== Season by season record ==
Champions	Runners-up	Third place	Promoted	Relegated

Season	Div.	Teams	Pos.	P	W (OTW / PKW)	D	L (OTL / PKL)	F	A	GD	Pts	Attendance/G	J.League Cup	Emperor's Cup	Asia	
1994	J1	12	8th	44	20	-	24	56	69	-13	-	14,497	Final	1st round	–	–
1995	J1	14	6th	52	28 (- / 0)	-	23 (- / 1)	88	77	11	85	17,313	Not held	2nd round	–	–
1996	J1	16	4th	30	20 (- / 0)	-	8 (- / 2)	53	38	15	62	13,792	Group stage	3rd round	–	–
1997	J1	17	1st	32	20 (3 / 0)	-	6 (3 / 0)	72	35	35	66	10,448	Final	Semi-final	–	–
1998	J1	18	2nd	34	26 (0 / 0)	-	7 (1 / 0)	107	39	78	78	12,867	Winner	Quarter final	–	–
1999	J1	16	1st	30	14 (3 / -)	1	9 (3 / -)	52	42	10	49	12,273	Quarter final	Quarter-final	CC	Winner
2000	J1	16	4th	30	17 (2)	0	7 (4)	67	42	25	55	12,534	Quarter-final	Quarter final	CC	Final
2001	J1	16	2nd	30	18 (8)	1	2 (1)	63	26	37	71	16,650	Final	4th round	CC	Final
2002	J1	16	1st	30	18 (8)	1	3	72	30	42	71	16,564	Quarter final	Quarter final	–	–
2003	J1	16	2nd	30	16	9	5	56	34	22	57	17,267	Semi-final	Winner	–	–
2004	J1	16	5th	30	14	6	10	54	44	10	48	17,126	Group stage	Final	CL	Group stage
2005	J1	18	6th	34	14	9	11	51	41	10	51	17,296	Quarter-final	Quarter final	CL	Group stage
2006	J1	18	5th	34	17	7	10	68	51	17	58	18,002	Quarter-final	Quarter final	–	–
2007	J1	18	9th	34	15	4	15	54	55	-1	49	16,359	Group stage	5th round	–	–
2008	J1	18	16th	34	10	7	17	40	48	-8	37	15,465	Group stage	5th round	–	–
2009	J1	18	11th	34	11	8	15	50	60	-10	41	13,523	Group stage	4th round	–	–
2010	J1	18	11th	34	11	11	12	38	49	-11	44	12,137	Winner	4th round	–	–
2011	J1	18	8th	34	13	8	13	53	45	8	47	11,796	Quarter final	3rd round	–	–
2012	J1	18	12th	34	13	7	14	57	53	4	46	13,122	Group stage	4th round	–	–
2013	J1	18	17th	34	4	11	19	40	56	-16	23	10,895	Group stage	Quarter final	–	–
2014	J2	22	4th	42	18	13	11	67	55	12	67	8,774	Not eligible	3rd round	–	–
2015	J2	22	2nd	42	24	10	8	72	43	29	82	10,041	Not eligible	2nd round	–	–
2016	J1	18	13th	34	8	12	14	37	50	-13	36	14,611	Group stage	3rd round	–	–
2017	J1	18	6th	34	16	10	8	50	30	20	58	16,321	Group stage	Quarter final	–	–
2018	J1	18	16th	34	10	11	13	35	48	-13	41	15,474	Play-off stage	Quarter final	–	–
2019	J1	18	18th	34	8	7	19	29	51	-22	31	15,277	Play-off stage	4th round	–	–
2020 †	J2	22	6th	42	16	15	11	58	47	11	63	3,214	Not eligible	Did not qualify	–	–
2021 †	J2	22	1st	42	27	10	5	75	42	33	91	5,968	Not eligible	Quarter final	–	–
2022	J1	18	18th	34	6	12	16	32	57	-25	30	9,942	Group stage	Round of 16	–	–
2023	J2	22	2nd	42	21	12	9	74	44	30	75	10,446	Group stage	3rd round	–	–
2024	J1	20	18th	38	10	8	20	47	68	-21	38	13,817	2nd round	2nd round	–	–
2025	J2	20	5th	38	19	7	12	59	51	8	64	12,325	Playoff round	2nd round	–	–
2026	J2	40	32nd	18	5	6	7	16	23	-7	25	9,460	N/A	N/A	–	–
2026-27	J2	20	TBD	38									1st round	2nd round	–	–

- Pos. = Position in league; P = Games played; W = Games won; D = Games drawn; L = Games lost; F = Goals scored; A = Goals conceded; GD = Goals difference; Pts = Points gained
- OTW / PKW = Overtime wins / Penalty kicks wins 1997 & 1998 seasons - 1999, 2000, 2001 & 2002 Overtime wins only
- OTL / PKL = Overtime losses / Penalty kicks losses 1997 and 1998 seasons - 1999, 2000 & 2001 Overtime losses only
- Attendance/G = Average league home attendance
- † 2020 & 2021 seasons attendances reduced by COVID-19 worldwide pandemic
- Source: J.League Data Site

== Honours ==
Júbilo Iwata honours
Honour	No.	Years
Japan Soccer League Division 1/J1 League	4	1987/88, 1997, 1999, 2002
Japan Soccer League Division 2/Japan Football League/J2 League	3	1982, 1992, 2021
Regional Promotion Series	2	1977, 1978
Emperor's Cup	2	1982, 2003
J.League Cup	2	1998, 2010
Japanese Super Cup	3	2000, 2003, 2004
Asian Club Championship	1	1998/99
Asian Super Cup	1	1999
J.League Cup / Copa Sudamericana Championship	1	2011

== Managerial history ==
Manager	Nationality	Tenure	
Manager	Nationality	Start	Finish
Ryuichi Sugiyama	Japan	1974	30 June 1987
Kikuo Konagaya	Japan	1 July 1987	31 December 1991
Kazuaki Nagasawa	Japan	1 January 1992	31 January 1994
Hans Ooft	Netherlands	1 February 1994	31 January 1997
Luiz Felipe Scolari	Brazil	1 February 1997	29 May 1997
Takashi Kuwahara	Japan	29 May 1997	31 January 1998
Valmir	Brazil	1 February 1998	31 December 1998
Takashi Kuwahara	Japan	1 February 1999	31 January 2000
Gjoko Hadžievski	Macedonia	1 February 2000	31 August 2000
Masakazu Suzuki	Japan	1 September 2000	31 January 2003
Masaaki Yanagishita	Japan	1 February 2003	31 January 2004
Takashi Kuwahara	Japan	1 February 2004	31 August 2004
Masakazu Suzuki	Japan	1 September 2004	9 November 2004
Masakuni Yamamoto	Japan	9 November 2004	19 June 2006
Adílson Batista	Brazil	23 June 2006	1 September 2007
Atsushi Uchiyama	Japan	1 September 2007	31 August 2008
Hans Ooft	Netherlands	2 September 2008	31 January 2009
Masaaki Yanagishita	Japan	1 February 2009	31 January 2011
Hitoshi Morishita	Japan	1 February 2012	4 May 2013
Tetsu Nagasawa	Japan	5 May 2013	26 May 2013
Takashi Sekizuka	Japan	27 May 2013	31 January 2014
Péricles Chamusca	Brazil	1 February 2014	24 September 2014
Hiroshi Nanami	Japan	25 September 2014	30 June 2019
Hideto Suzuki	Japan	1 July 2019	15 August 2019
Minoru Kobayashi	Japan	15 August 2019	19 August 2019
Fernando Jubero	Spain	20 August 2019	1 October 2020
Masakazu Suzuki	Japan	2 October 2020	31 January 2021
Akira Ito	Japan	1 February 2022	14 August 2022
Hiroki Shibuya	Japan	17 August 2022	31 January 2023
Akinobu Yokouchi	Japan	1 February 2023	18 December 2024
John Hutchinson	Malta	19 December 2024	28 September 2025
Takayoshi Amma	Japan	29 September 2025	22 December 2025
Ryo Shigaki	Japan	22 December 2025	22 April 2026
Fumitake Miura	Japan	22 April 2026	15 June 2026
Tadahiro Akiba	Japan	15 June 2026	Present

== Players who played in the FIFA World Cup ==
The following players have been selected by their country in the World Cup, while playing for Júbilo Iwata:

- (Brazil) Dunga (1998)
- (Japan) Hiroshi Nanami (1998)
- (Japan) Masashi Nakayama (1998, 2002)
- (Japan) Toshihiro Hattori (1998, 2002)
- (Japan) Takashi Fukunishi (2002, 2006)
- (South Korea) Kim Jin-Kyu (2006)
- (Japan) Yūichi Komano (2010)
- (Japan) Masahiko Inoha (2014)

=== Award winners ===
The following players have won the awards while at Júbilo Iwata:

- J.League Player of the Year
  - (Brazil) Dunga (1997)
  - (Japan) Masashi Nakayama (1998)
  - (Japan) Toshiya Fujita (2001)
  - (Japan) Naohiro Takahara (2002)
- J.League Top Scorer
  - (Japan) Masashi Nakayama (1998, 2000)
  - (Japan) Naohiro Takahara (2002)
  - (Japan) Ryoichi Maeda (2009, 2010)
- J.League Best XI
  - (Japan) Hiroshi Nanami (1996, 1997, 1998, 2002)
  - (Brazil) Dunga (1997, 1998)
  - (Japan) Tomoaki Ōgami (1997)
  - (Japan) Masashi Nakayama (1997, 1998, 2000, 2002)
  - (Japan) Daisuke Oku (1998)
  - (Japan) Toshiya Fujita (1998, 2001, 2002)
  - (Japan) Makoto Tanaka (1998)
  - (Japan) Takashi Fukunishi (1999, 2001, 2002, 2003)
  - (Netherlands) Arno van Zwam (2001)
  - (Japan) Toshihiro Hattori (2001)
  - (Japan) Go Oiwa (2001)
  - (Japan) Hideto Suzuki (2002)
  - (Japan) Makoto Tanaka (2002)
  - (Japan) Naohiro Takahara (2002)
  - (Japan) Yoshikatsu Kawaguchi (2006)
  - (Japan) Ryoichi Maeda (2009, 2010)
  - (Japan) Yūichi Komano (2012)
- J.League Rookie of the Year
  - (Japan) Robert Cullen (2005)
- J.League Cup MVP
  - (Japan) Nobuo Kawaguchi (1998)
  - (Japan) Ryoichi Maeda (2010)
- J.League Cup New Hero Award
  - (Japan) Hiroshi Nanami (1996)
  - (Japan) Naohiro Takahara (1998)
- J2 League Top Scorer
  - (England) Jay Bothroyd (2015)

=== Club captains ===
- (Japan) Shinichi Morishita(1994)
- (Japan) Mitsunori Yoshida (1995)
- (Japan) Masashi Nakayama (1996–1998)
- (Japan) Toshihiro Hattori (1999–2005)
- (Japan) Takashi Fukunishi (2006)
- (Japan) Hideto Suzuki (2007)
- (Japan) Yoshikatsu Kawaguchi (2008)
- (Japan) Ryo Takano (2009)
- (Japan) Daisuke Nasu (2010–2011)
- (Japan) Daiki Yamada (2012–2013)
- (Japan) Daisuke Matsui (2014)
- (Japan) Ryoichi Maeda (2014)
- (Japan) Kota Ueda (2015–2016)
- (Japan) Kentaro Oi (2017)
- (Japan) Nagisa Sakurauchi (2018–2020)
- (Japan) Hiroki Yamada (2021–)

=== Former players ===
Players with senior international caps:

JFA

- (Japan) Hiroki Yamada
- (Japan) Hiroshi Nanami
- (Japan) Masashi Nakayama
- (Japan) Masahiko Inoha
- (Japan) Naohiro Takahara
- (Japan) Norihiro Nishi
- (Japan) Ryoichi Maeda
- (Japan) Takashi Fukunishi
- (Japan) Toshihiro Hattori
- (Japan) Yūichi Komano

AFC/ CAF/ OFC

- (North Korea) Hwang Song-su
- (North Korea) Kim Jong-song
- (South Korea) Baek Sung-dong
- (South Korea) Choi Yong-soo
- (South Korea) Han Sang-woon
- (South Korea) Jung Woo-young
- (South Korea) Kim Jin-Kyu
- (South Korea) Lee Gang-Jin
- (South Korea) Lee Keun-ho
- (South Korea) Park Joo-ho

UEFA

- (Italy) Salvatore Schillaci
- (Netherlands) André Paus
- (Netherlands) Arno van Zwam
- (Netherlands) Gerald Vanenburg
- (Russia) Dmitri Radchenko
- (Serbia) Aleksandar Živković
- (Greece) Avraam Papadopoulos

CONMEBOL

- (Brazil) Adílson Batista
- (Brazil) Alessandro Cambalhota
- (Brazil) Carlinhos Paraíba
- (Brazil) Dedimar
- (Brazil) Dunga
- (Brazil) Fabrício
- (Brazil) Ferdinando Leda
- (Brazil) Gavião
- (Brazil) Gilsinho
- (Brazil) Henrique
- (Brazil) Marcelo Mabilia
- (Brazil) Marquinhos Paraná
- (Brazil) Popo
- (Brazil) Rodrigo
- (Brazil) Rodrigo Gral
- (Brazil) Rodrigo Souto
- (Brazil) Thiago
- (Brazil) Tinga
- (Brazil) Walter
- (Paraguay) Roberto Torres

Achievements
Preceded by Pohang Steelers (South Korea)	Champions of Asia; 1998–99	Succeeded by Al Hilal (Saudi Arabia)
