= Itabashi (disambiguation) =

The Japanese name Itabashi (板橋) may refer to:

- Itabashi, a special ward of Tokyo, Japan
- Itabashi Bridge
- Itabashi (surname)
