= 板橋 =

板橋, meaning "wooden plank bridge", may refer to:

- Banqiao District, a district in New Taipei City, Taiwan
- Itabashi, a special ward in Tokyo, Japan
- Pangyo County, a county in Kangwon Province, North Korea
- Pangyo-dong, a neighborhood in Seongnam, South Korea

== See also ==
- The dictionary definition of 板 at Wiktionary
- The dictionary definition of 橋 at Wiktionary
- Banqiao (disambiguation)
- Bridge (disambiguation)
- Itabashi (surname)
- Pangyo (disambiguation)
- Wooden plank
