= Banqiao =

Banqiao (traditional Chinese: 板橋; simplified Chinese: 板桥) may refer to:

== Taiwan ==
- Banqiao District, seat of New Taipei City

== Mainland China ==
- Banqiao Dam (板桥水库大坝), dam on the Ru River near Zhumadian, Henan that suffered an infamous failure in 1975
- Banqiao Town (disambiguation)
- Banqiao Township (disambiguation)
- Zheng Banqiao (1693–1765), born name Zheng Xie, Chinese painter from Jiangsu

== See also ==
- 板橋 (disambiguation)
- Woodbridge (disambiguation)
