= Pangyo =

Pangyo may refer to:

- Pangyo County, a county in Kangwon Province, North Korea
- Pangyo-myeon, a township in Seocheon County, South Chungcheong Province, South Korea
- Pangyo, Seongnam, a new town in Seongnam, Gyeonggi Province, South Korea
- Pangyo-dong, a neighborhood in Seongnam
- Pangyo station in Pangyo, Seongnam
- Pangyo Techno Valley, an industrial complex in Pangyo, Seongnam

== See also ==
- 板橋 (disambiguation)
