= Daimon, Itabashi =

Daimon 大門
- District
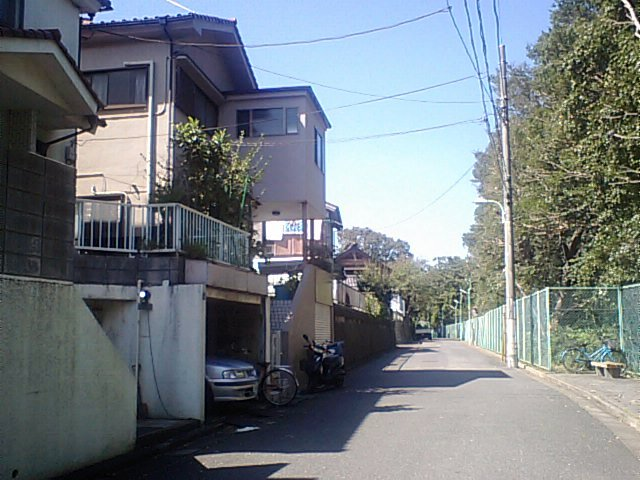
- Residential area behind Suwa Shrine
- Interactive map of Daimon
- Coordinates: 35.7840726°N 139.6477544°E
- Country: Japan
- City: Tokyo
- Ward: Itabashi
- Area: Akatsuka Area

Population (February 1, 2016)
  - Total: 1,139
- Time zone: UTC+9 (JST)
- Postal code: 175-0085
- Area code: 03

Daimon (大門) is a district of Itabashi, Tokyo, Japan. As of February 1, 2016, the population in the district is 1,139. The postal code is 175-0085.

== Facilities ==
- Akatsuka Park
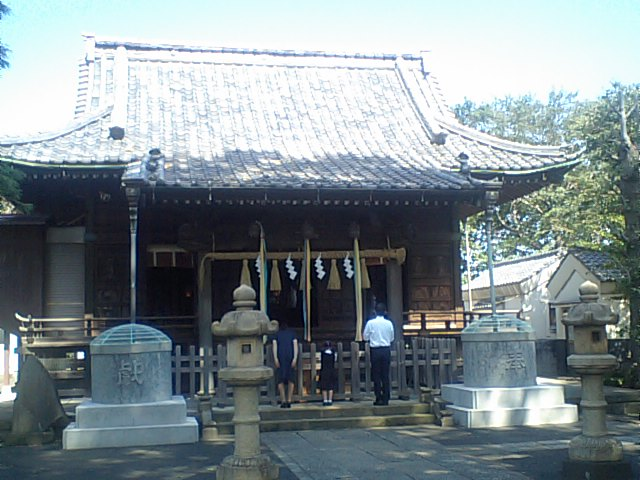
Suwa Shrine
