= Moro Site =

Archaeological site in Tokyo, Japan

- 茂呂遺跡 (Japanese)
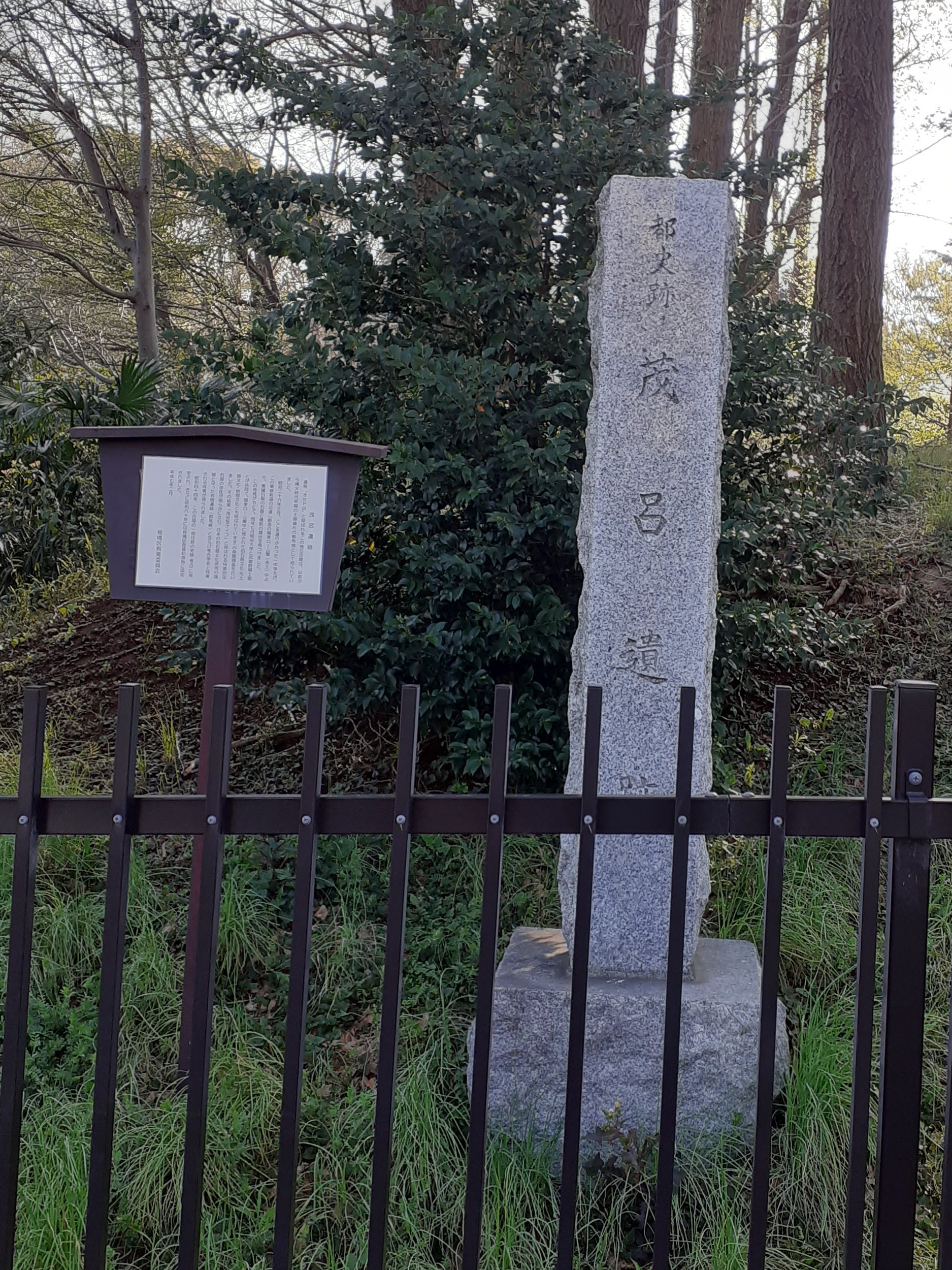
- Stone marker and information board on the west side of the site
- Interactive map of Moro Site
- 35°45′14.5614″N 139°40′35.583″E
- Type: Archaeological site
- Periods: Japanese Paleolithic
- Location: Itabashi Ward, Tokyo, Japan

Site notes
- Owner: Public
- Public access: No

The Moro Site (茂呂遺跡, Moro iseki), also referred to as the Moro archaeological site, is a Paleolithic archaeological site in Itabashi Ward, Tokyo, Japan. It is known for the discovery of stone tools dating to the Japanese Paleolithic period.

== History ==
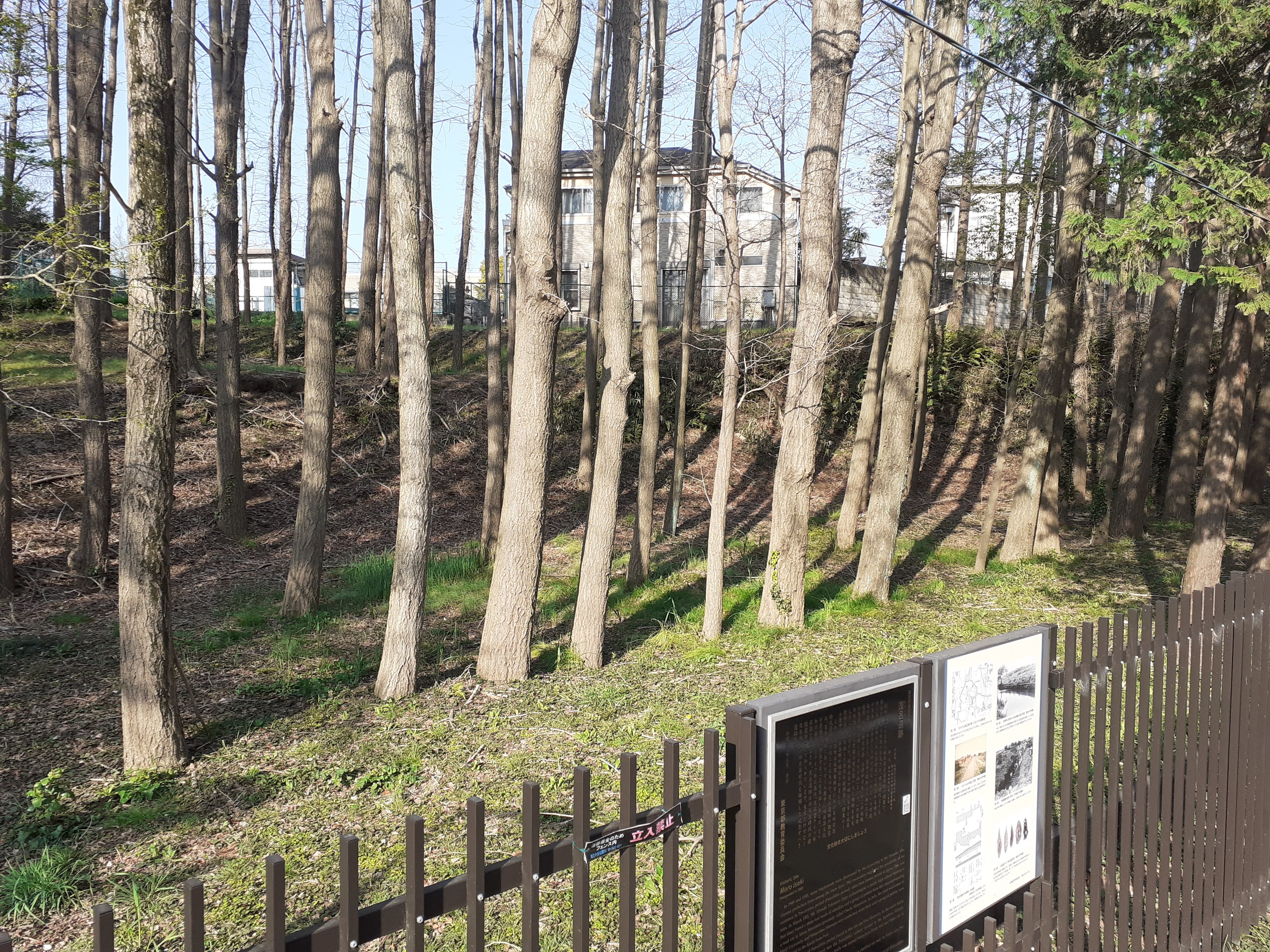
Wooded area viewed from the northeast side

In March 1951, a junior high school student, Hiroshi Takizawa (瀧澤 浩), who later became an archaeologist, discovered obsidian stone tools and clusters of pebbles in a road cutting through a hill known as Osedo-yama (オセド山). A joint excavation was conducted by Meiji University and the Musashino Museum in July of the same year.

This investigation was one of the earliest studies of the Japanese Paleolithic in the Kantō region, following research at the Iwajuku site in Gunma Prefecture. The findings demonstrated that Paleolithic culture, predating the Jōmon period, was present across the Japanese archipelago. A distinctive type of knife-shaped stone tool discovered at the site was later named the Moro-type knife-shaped stone tool (茂呂型ナイフ形石器, Moro-gata naifu-gata sekki).

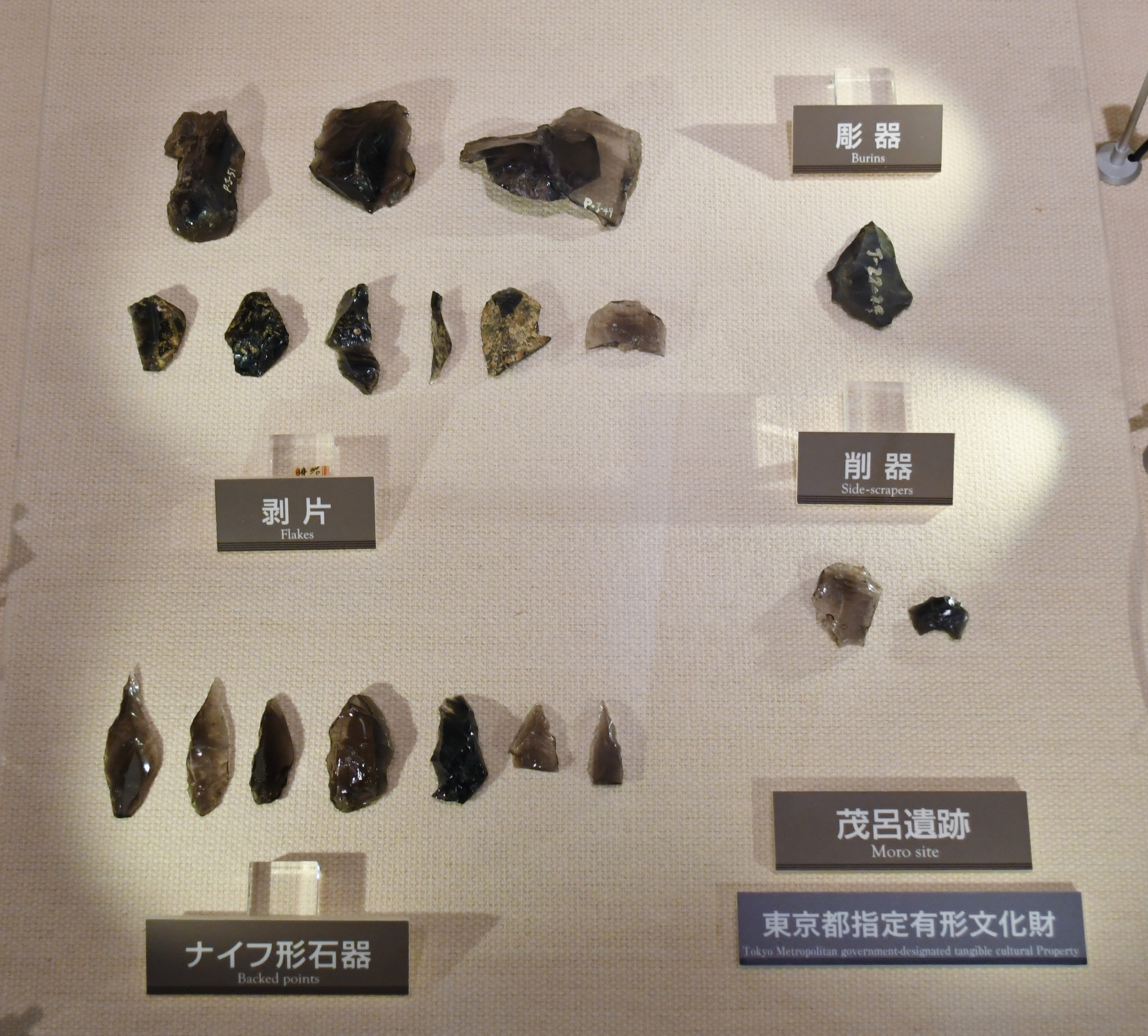
Artifacts exhibited at the Meiji University Museum

The excavated assemblage includes burins, side-scrapers, lithic flakes, and backed points. The site was designated a historic site of Tokyo in 1969 and of Itabashi Ward in 1984. In 1999, 22 excavated stone tools were designated as tangible cultural properties of Tokyo.

== Location ==
The site is located within Jōhoku-Chūō Park in Tokyo but is not accessible to the public in order to protect the wooded area. A stone marker and information boards indicate the site’s location.

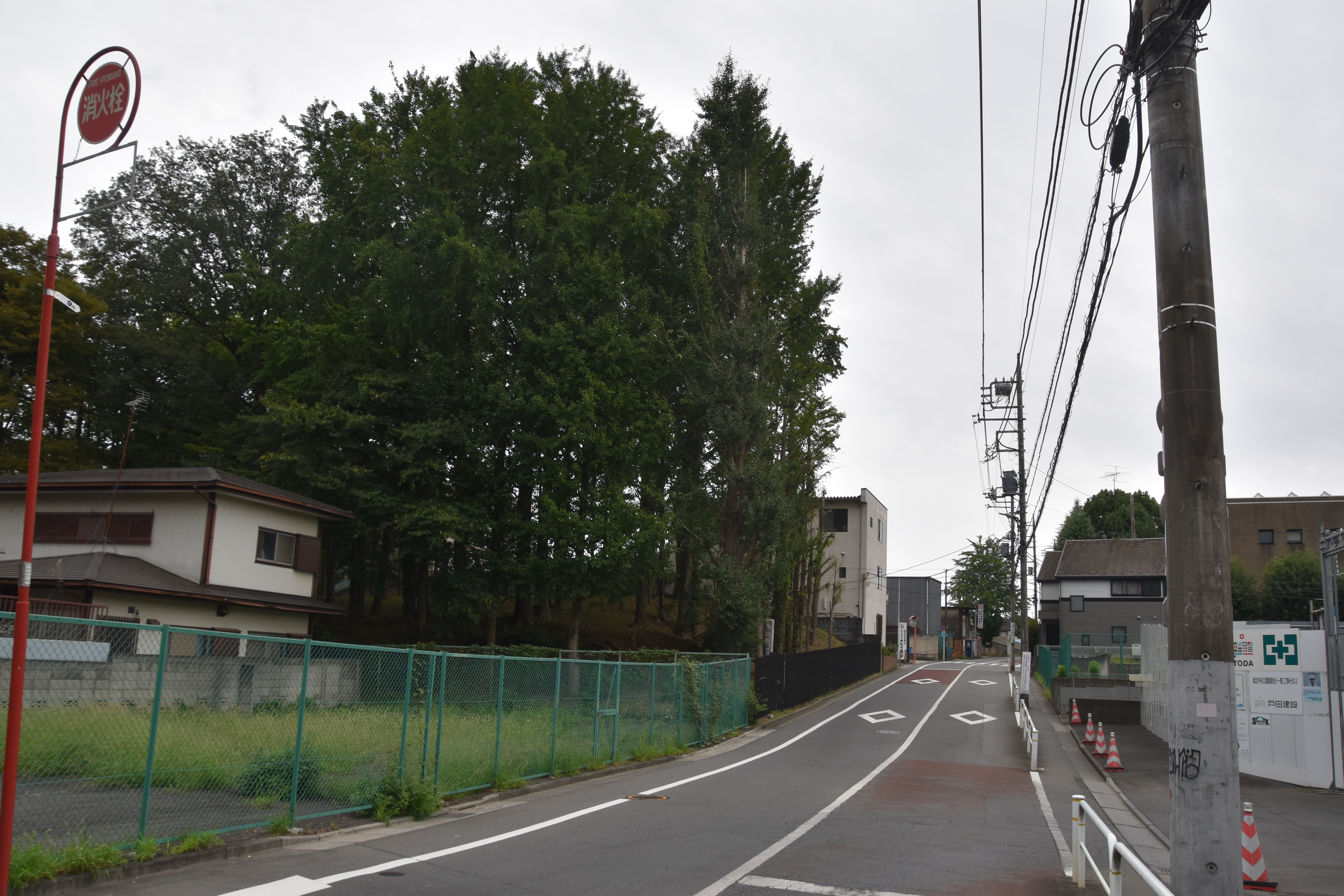
The site viewed from Moroyama-dōri Street
