= Jōhoku-Chūō Park =

Park in Tokyo, Japan

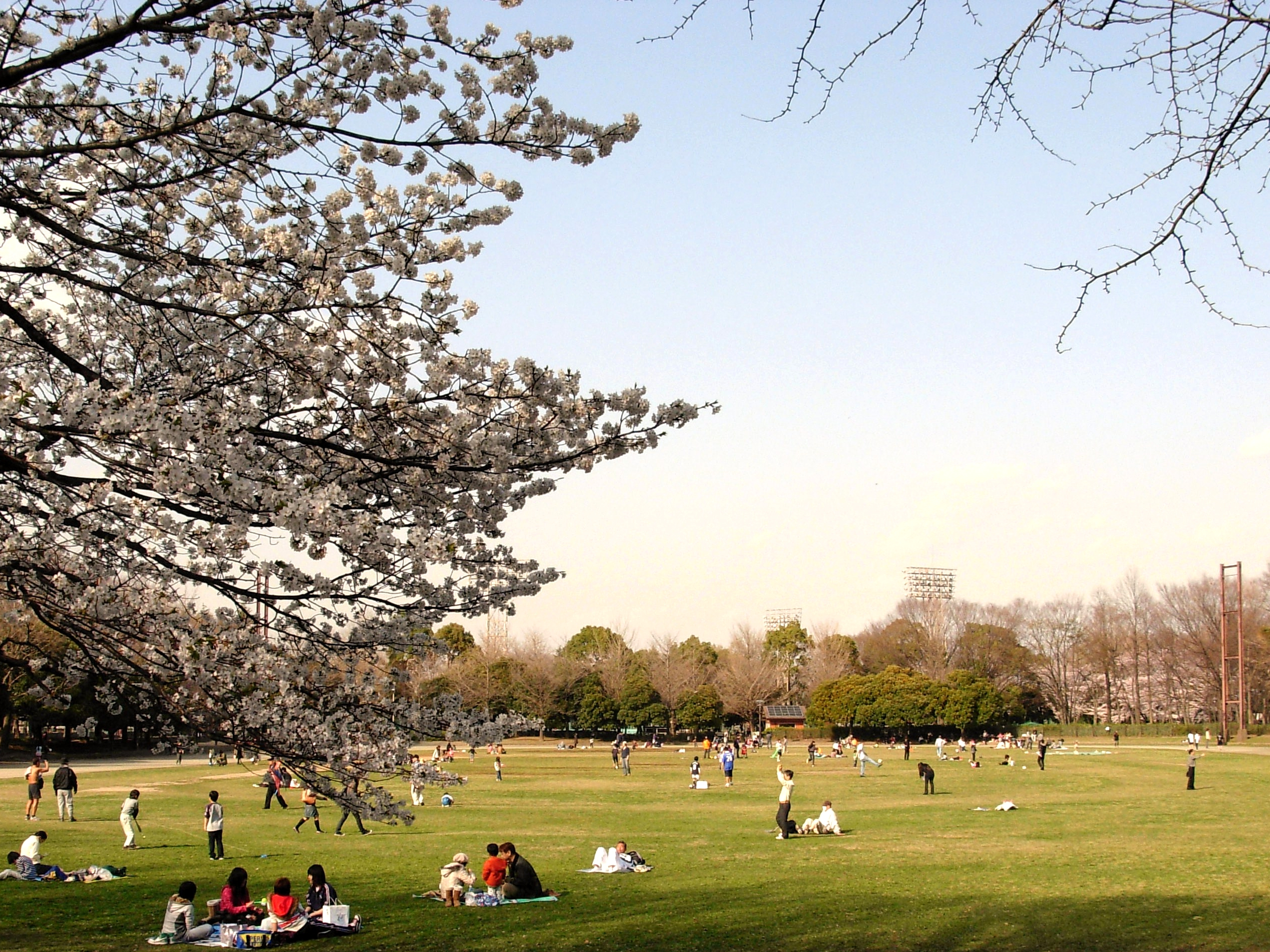
- The park in April 2010
- Interactive map of Jōhoku-Chūō Park
- Type: Public park
- Location: Nerima and Itabashi, Tokyo, Japan
- Coordinates: 35°45′23″N 139°40′26″E
- Area: 262,369.07 square metres (64.83281 acres)
- Opened: 1 April 1957
- Public transit: Kami-Itabashi Station (Tobu Tojo Line); Hikawadai Station (Tokyo Metro Yurakucho Line)
- Website: www.tokyo-park.or.jp/park/format/index022.html

Jōhoku-Chūō Park (城北中央公園, Jōhoku-Chūō Kōen) is a metropolitan park (都立公園, toritsu kōen) located across Nerima and Itabashi wards in Tokyo, Japan. The park opened on 1 April 1957.

== Sports facilities ==
Jōhoku-Chūō Park has two main baseball fields and two smaller fields (for softball and junior use). It also has an athletics stadium (dirt surface) and nine tennis courts (four hard courts, four clay courts, and one artificial grass court). A gymnasium, Itabashi Kuritsu Kamiitabashi Gymnasium (上板橋体育館, Kami-Itabashi Taiikukan), is located adjacent to the park.

== Nature ==
The park contains over 3,000 trees, including Chinese parasol tree, ginkgo, Japanese zelkova, cherry (someiyoshino), sawara cypress, sasanqua, azalea, and camellia.

== Archaeological sites ==
The park contains two archaeological sites: the Kurihara Site and the Moro Site, both of which date to the Japanese Paleolithic period.

== Retention basin ==
A retention basin has been constructed within the park to manage excess water from the Shakujii River during periods of heavy rainfall.

Land acquisition for the project began in the mid-2010s. Construction of the first phase started in January 2018 and was completed in June 2025. The second phase involves the construction of additional caissons adjacent to those built in the first phase, with completion scheduled for 2030.

== Gallery ==
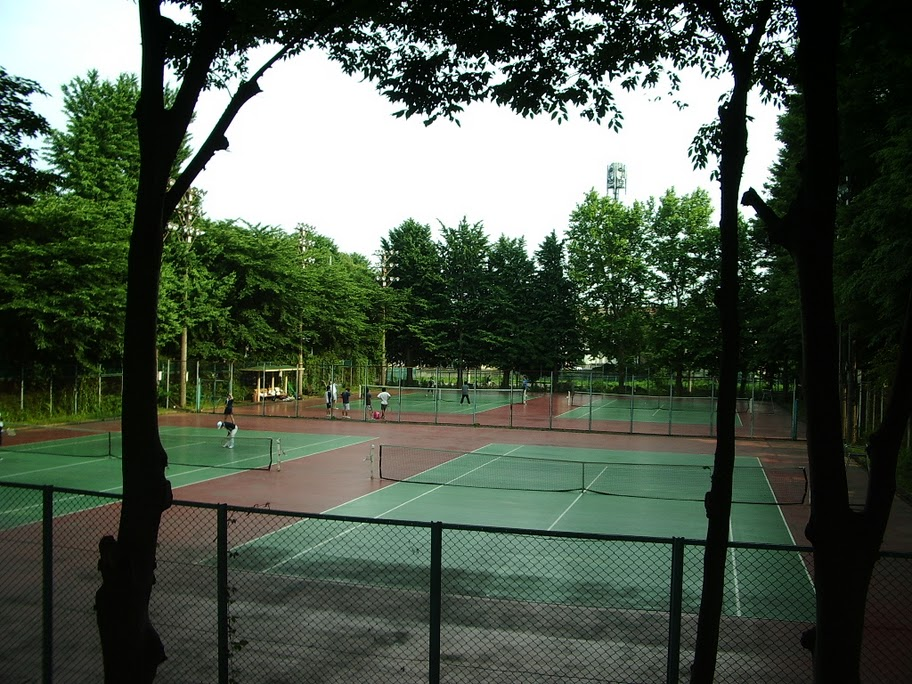
Tennis courts

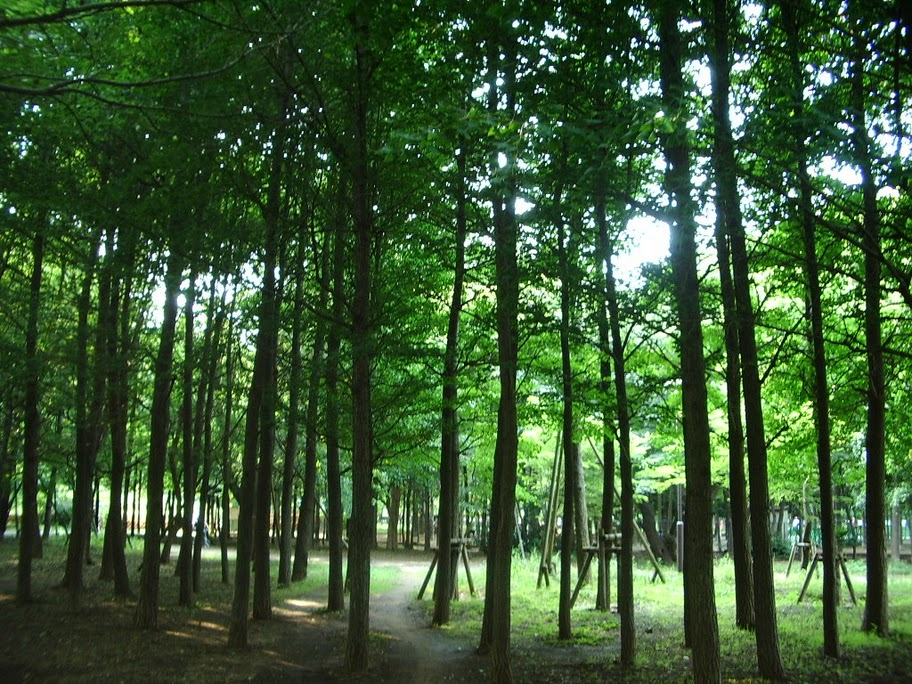
Wooded area

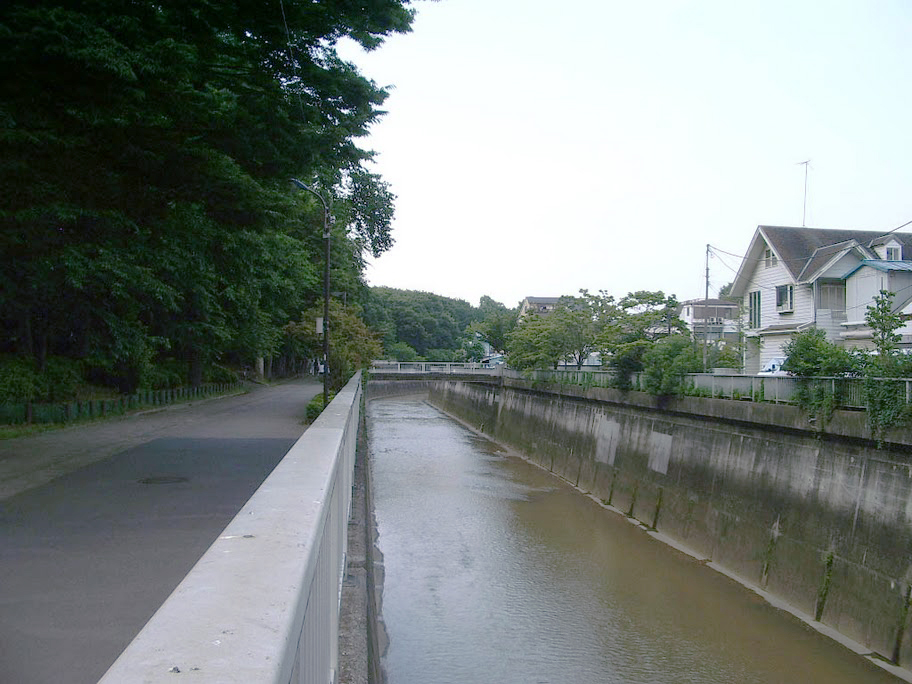
Shakujii River along the park's southeastern edge

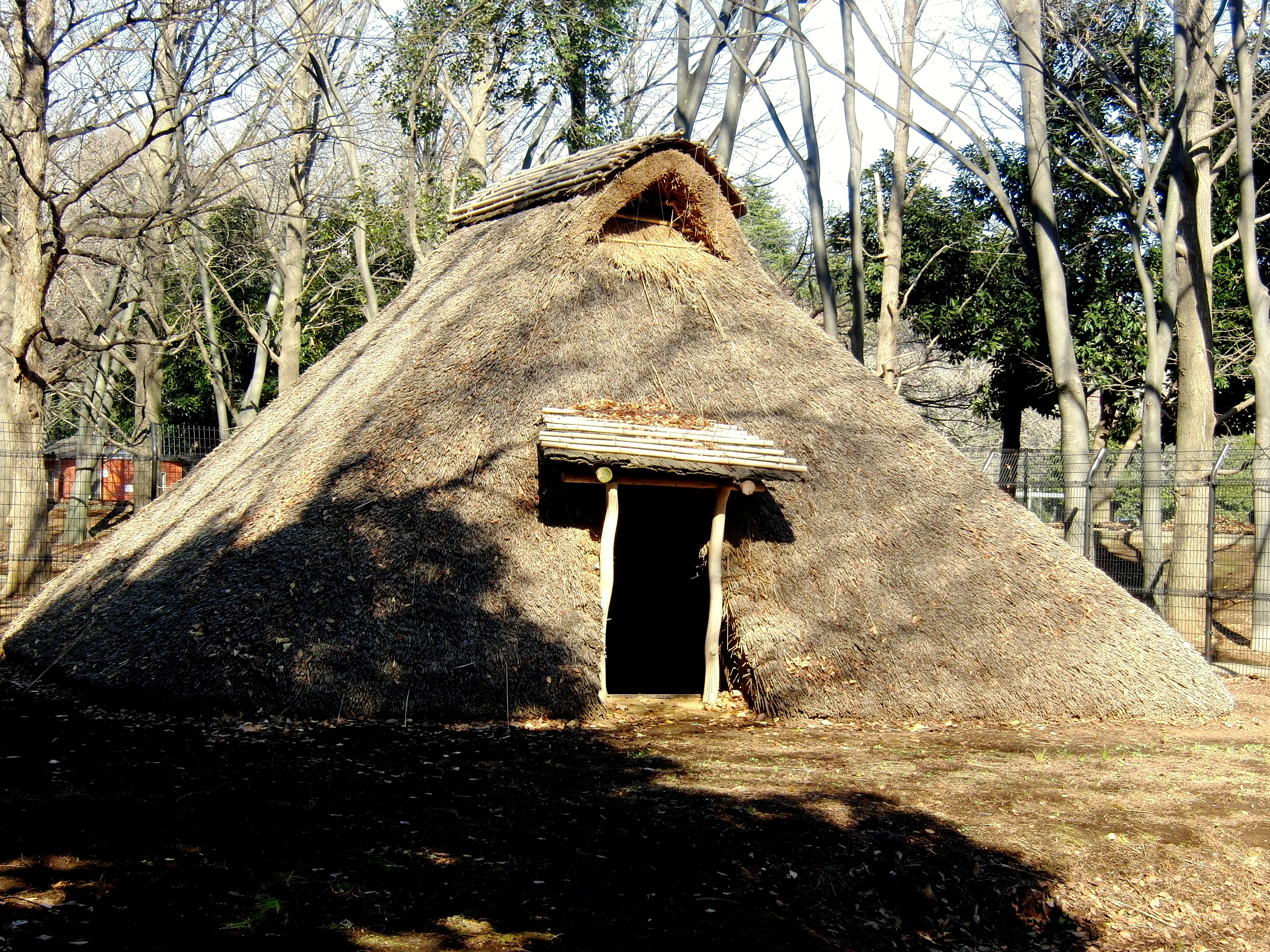
Kurihara Site

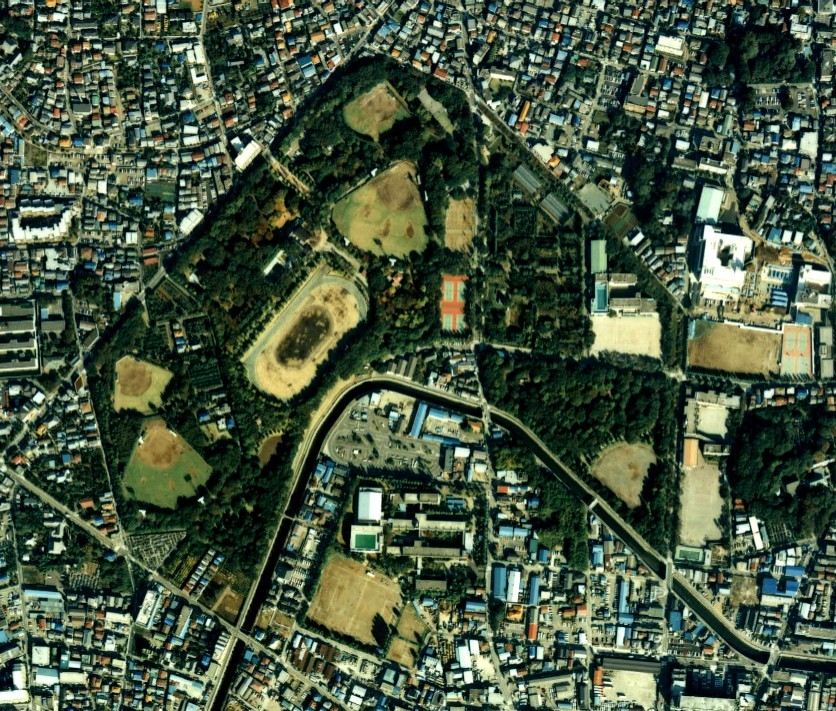
Aerial view (1989)

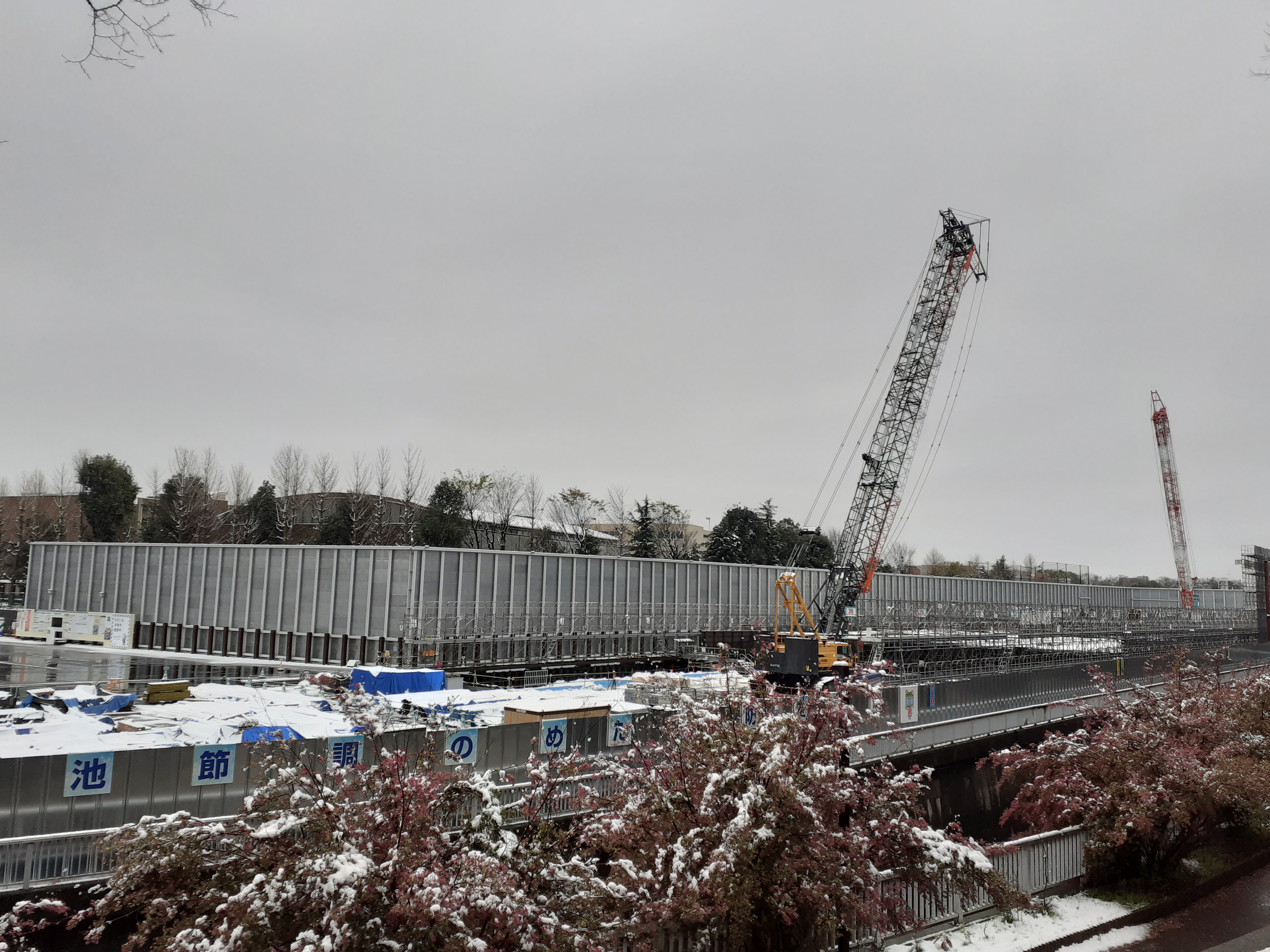
Construction in March 2020

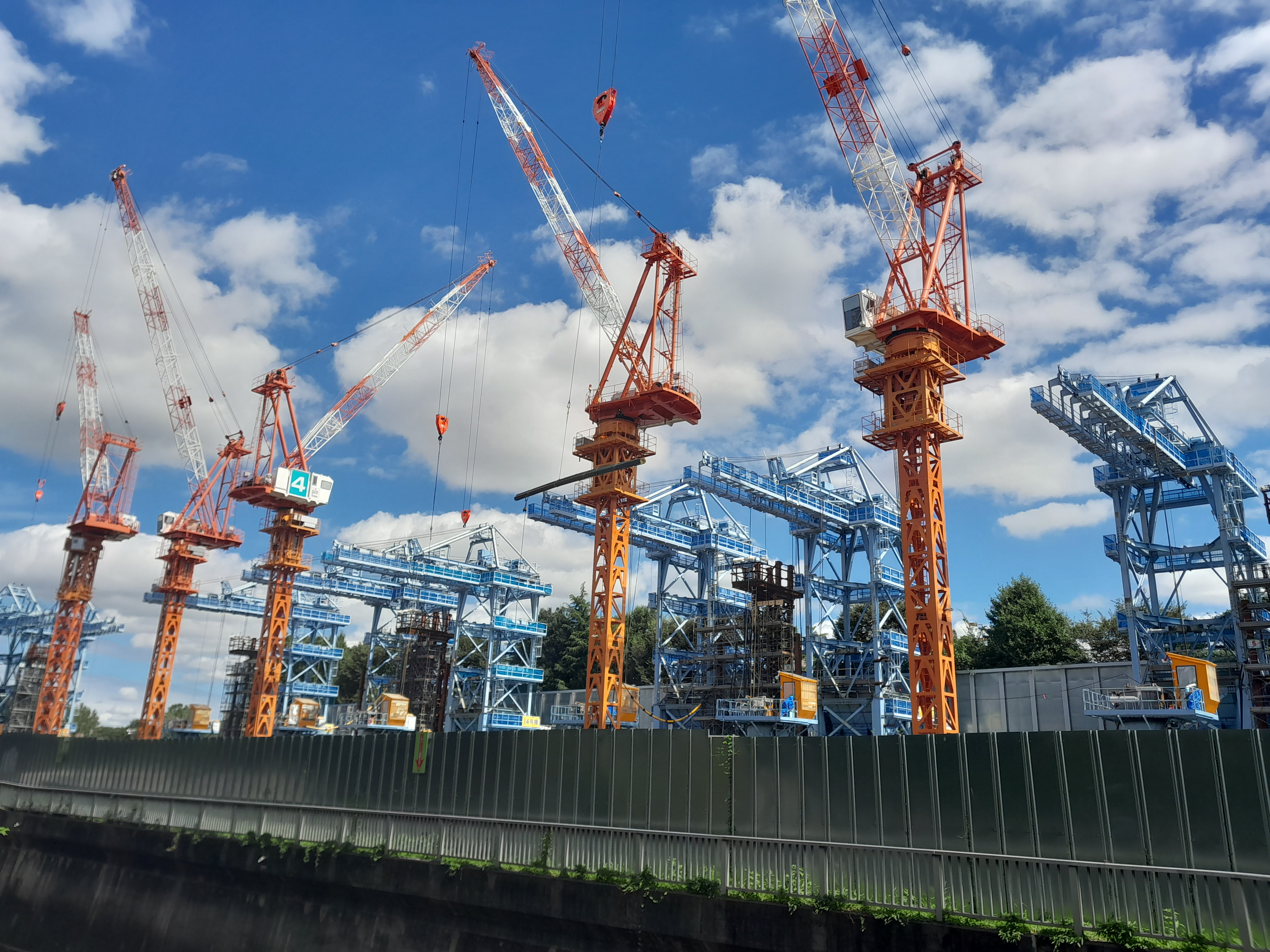
September 2022

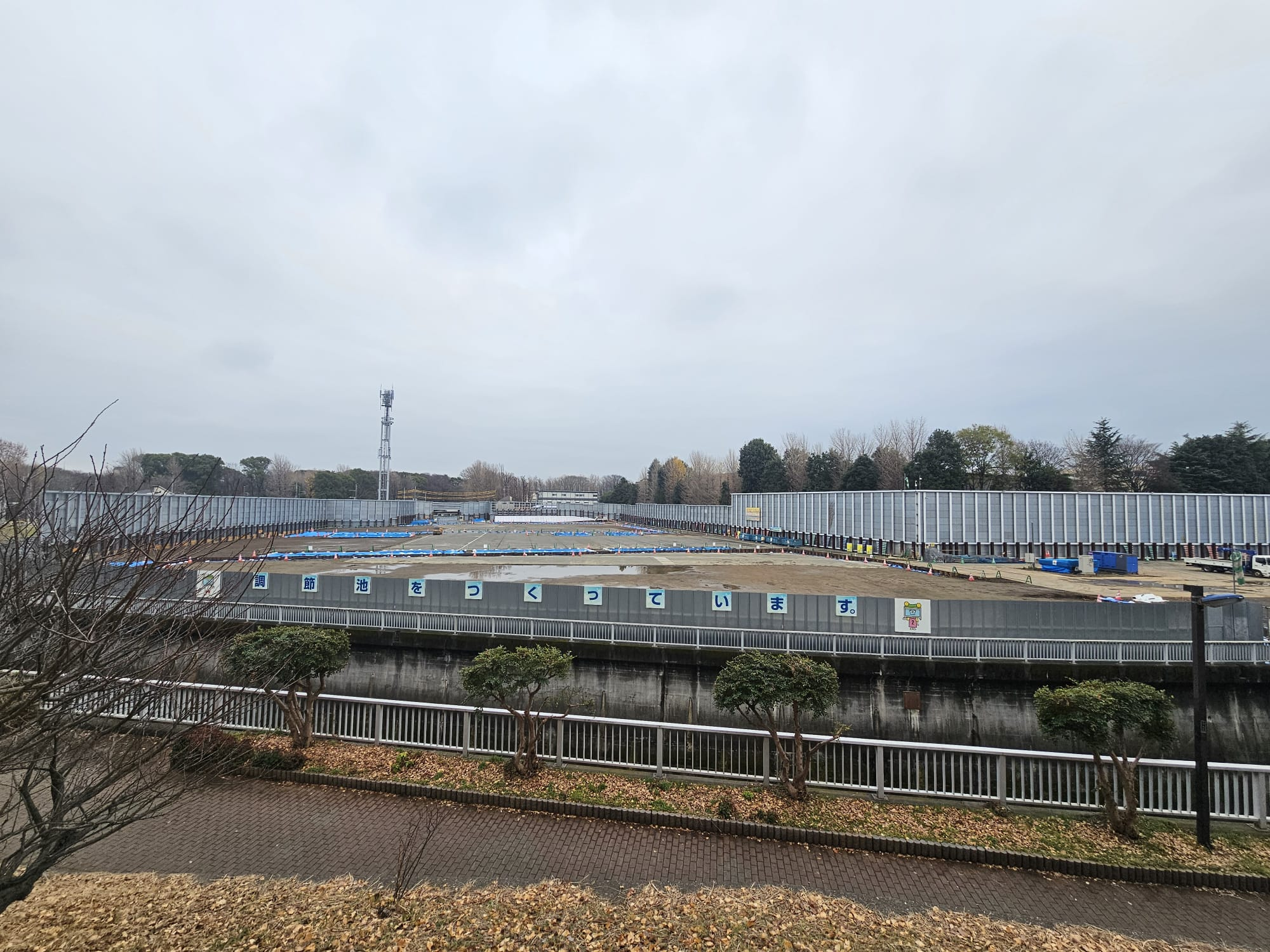
Completed phase 1 (December 2025)

== See also ==
- Parks and gardens in Tokyo
- National parks of Japan
