= Shō Ishikawa =

Japanese baseball player (born 1999)

Shō Ishikawa 石川翔
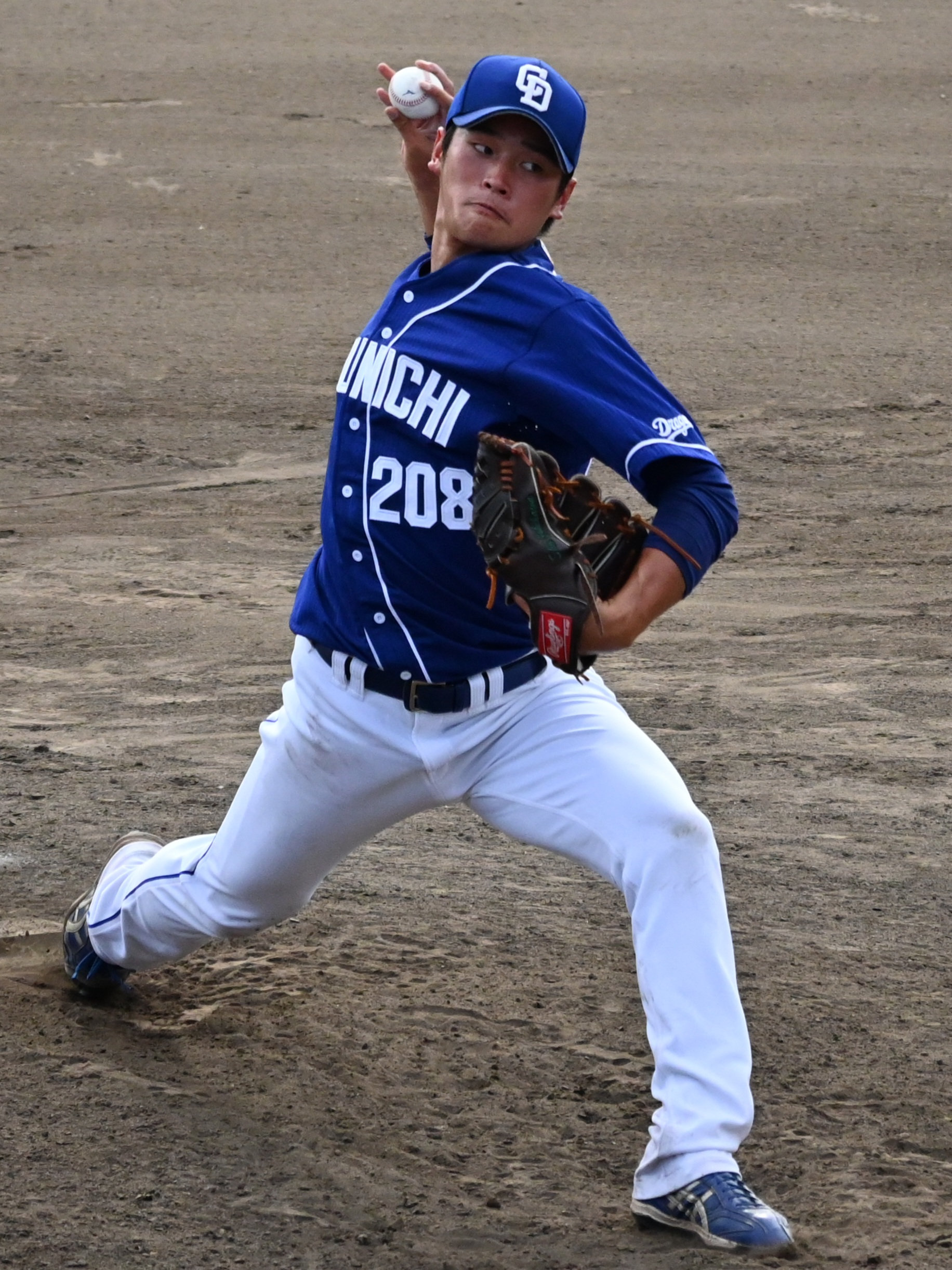
- Ishikawa with the Chunichi Dragons

Free agent
- Pitcher
- Born: December 14, 1999 (age 26); Itabashi, Tokyo, Japan
- Bats: Left Throws: Right

NPB debut
- October 13, 2018, for the Chunichi Dragons

NPB statistics (through 2018 season)
- Win–loss record: 0–0
- Earned run average: 0.00
- Strikeouts: 0
- Stats at Baseball Reference

Teams
- Chunichi Dragons (2018–2025)

Shō Ishikawa (石川翔, Ishikawa Shō; born December 14, 1999) is a Japanese professional baseball pitcher who is a free agent. He has previously played in Nippon Professional Baseball (NPB) for the Chunichi Dragons.

== Career ==
=== Chunichi Dragons ===
On October 20, 2017, Ishikawa was selected as the 2nd draft pick for the Chunichi Dragons at the 2017 NPB draft and on 10 November signed a provisional contract with a ¥60,000,000 sign-on bonus and a ¥7,000,000 yearly salary.

Ishikawa made only one appearance for Chunichi during his eight-year stint with the team, tossing a scoreless inning with no strikeouts.

=== Saraperos de Saltillo ===
On January 7, 2026, Ishikawa signed with the Saraperos de Saltillo of the Mexican League. He did not make an appearance for Saltillo, and was released by the team on April 20.

== Personal life ==
Ishikawa's mother is Filipino and his father is Japanese. As a boy, Ishikawa liked watching former Yokohama DeNA BayStars fireballer Marc Kroon as well as Hanshin Tigers fireman, Kyuji Fujikawa. He admires Yomiuri Giants ace, Tomoyuki Sugano as well as former Giants star Suguru Egawa.
