= Junior Ranger Program =

National Park Service education program

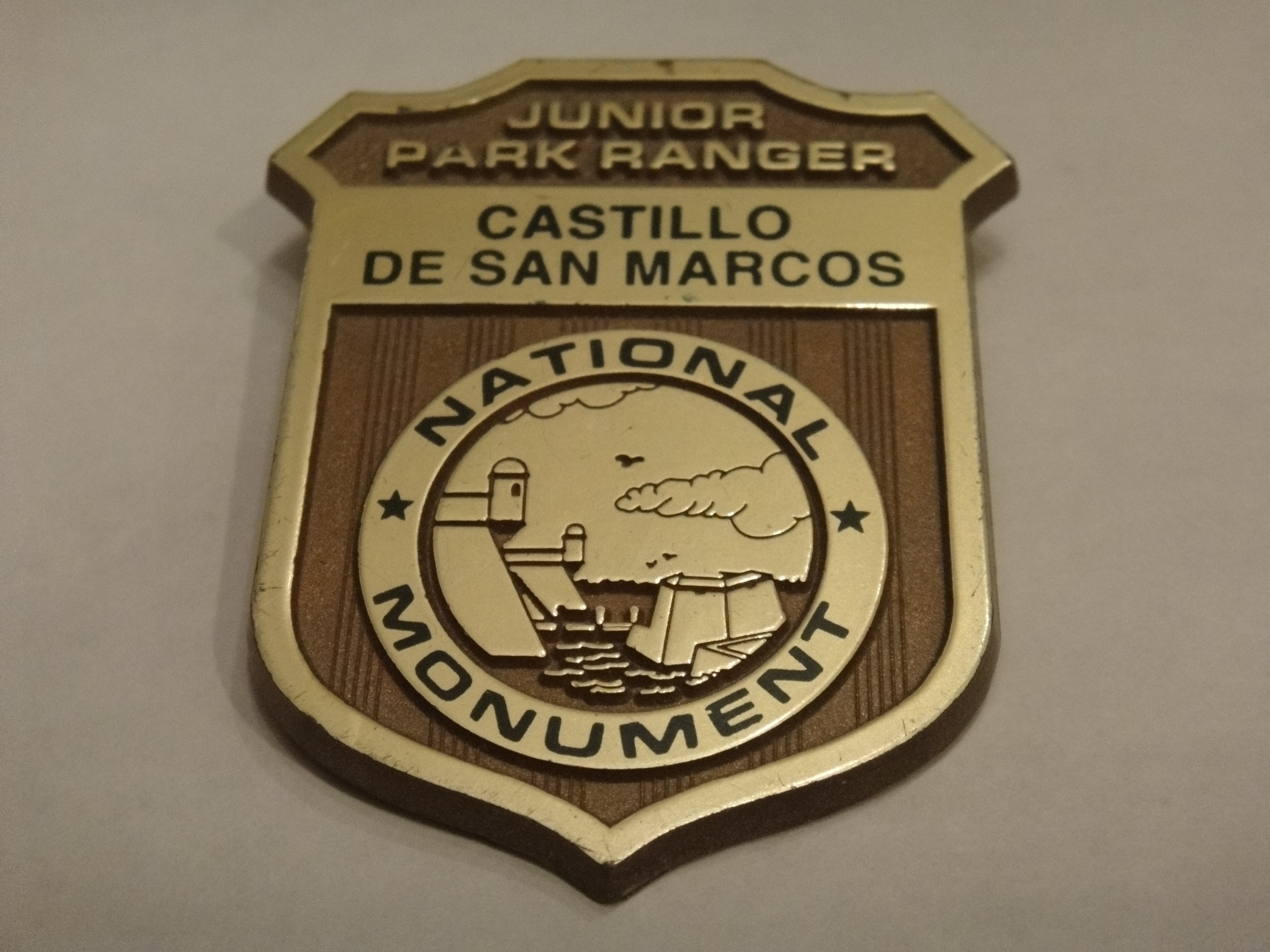
A Junior Park Ranger badge that was awarded by the Castillo de San Marcos National Monument.

The Junior Ranger Program is a youth-oriented educational program hosted by many US National Parks in which a child learns about the host park by completing activities. Usually self-guided, a Junior Ranger program may entail scavenger hunts, crosswords, or other interactive activities. Upon completion, the participant is awarded a patch, badge and/or certificate, unique to each park.

Generally, participants can pick up activity books at a park’s visitor center or a ranger station. The activity books direct participants to areas they might otherwise miss, and/or hidden gems. The booklets contain information that helps participants discover the importance of a park on their own terms, and decide what the park means to them personally.

Yosemite National Park was the first to start the Junior Ranger program back in the early 1930s. Other US public lands departments, such as the Bureau of Land Management or US Fish and Wildlife Service, have similar programs, as do some state parks.

== Specialty Badges and Patches ==
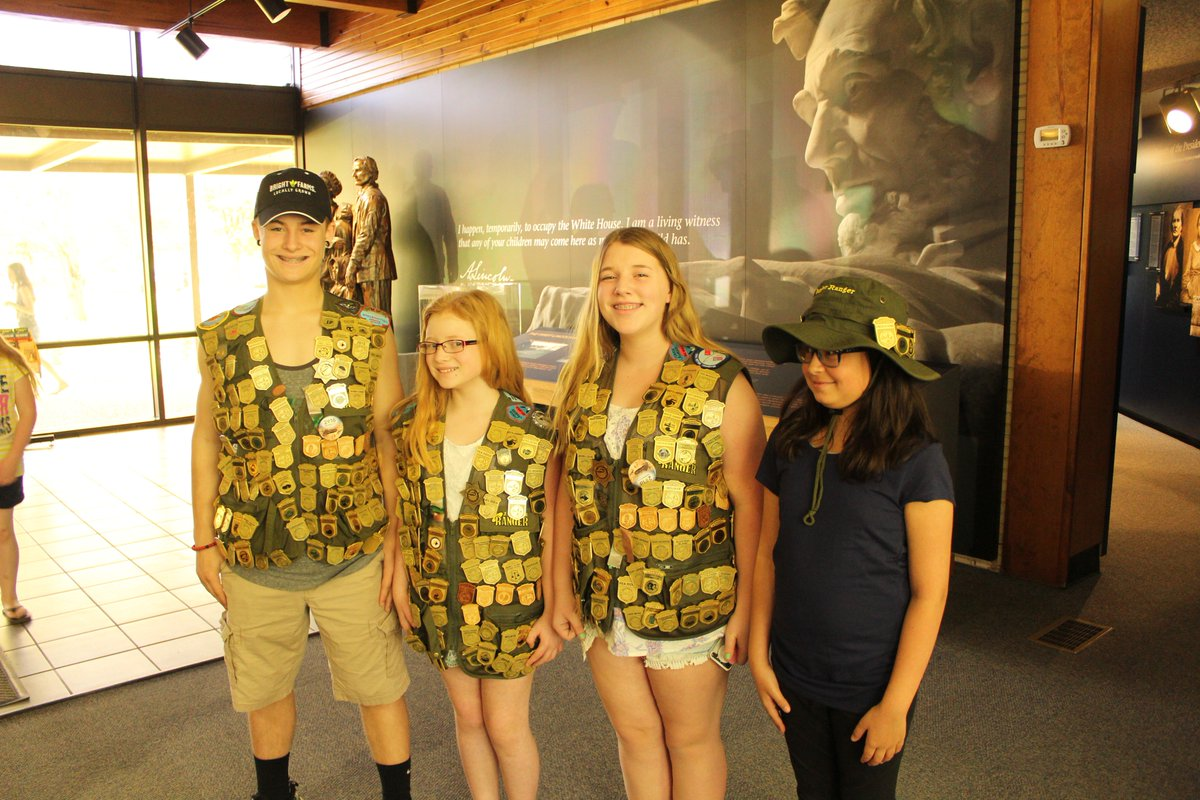
Junior Rangers at Abraham Lincoln Birthplace National Historical Park

Some parks or groups of parks offer specialty badges or patches and a certificate signed by a ranger. For example, select participating parks now offer a Junior Civil War Historian badge for participants who complete three activities—either junior ranger books at three parks or junior ranger books at two parks and one online activity. Select participating parks offer a Junior Paleontologist program. Some sites also offer additional patches for older participants. Organ Pipe Cactus National Monument offers both a Junior Ranger patch and a Desert Ranger patch for older participants. Guadalupe Mountains National Park offers a Junior Ranger patch, a Senior Ranger patch and a Wilderness Explorer patch. Bandelier National Monument offers four different patches based on age groups. The parks either offer different books for different age groups or a single book that requires a different number of activities be completed based on the child's age. Often the activities are coded with a visual clue on which activities are appropriate for a particular age group. Parks may post their books online so they can be printed out ahead of time.

Some parks offer completion of their Junior Ranger programs by mail. A booklet can be downloaded and printed, then mailed to the park upon completion. Such programs are primarily offered at sites that are more remote and thus less likely for a child to visit in person.

Some badges are event specific and can only be earned during certain periods and only by those actually attending the event. Other badges can be earned totally on line when a particular site is closed for an extended period of time.

In 2019, the Junior Ranger Passport Stamp program was introduced. These stamps can be obtained at parks with Junior Ranger programs.

== Non-NPS Junior Ranger programs ==
Individual state parks around the United States of America may offer Junior Ranger programs modeled after the National Park Service program.

== Outside the United States ==
While the Junior Ranger concept originated as a self-guided program for national park visitors in the United States, it has been adopted and adapted internationally. Depending on the country, these programs range from official government initiatives to community-based, long-term environmental education clubs.

=== Japan ===
In Japan, Junior Ranger programs have evolved beyond visitor-oriented national park activities into continuous, community-based environmental education and conservation initiatives supported by local communities, municipal governments, and non-profit organizations.

An official government initiative is the Junior Park Ranger (JPR) program, established in 1999 by the Ministry of the Environment. Conducted across various national parks, the program allows children to work alongside official park rangers on active conservation projects, such as invasive species control and wildlife surveys.

Grassroots and community-led initiatives are also widely active. The Yatsu Higata Junior Ranger program in Narashino, Chiba Prefecture (established in 1999), is a prominent long-term model based in a Ramsar wetland site. It utilizes a step-based curriculum where participating children eventually serve as peer educators and nature guides for center visitors.

Another notable community model is the Nerima Junior Ranger program in Nerima, Tokyo. Operating primarily along the Shakujii River watershed, it places strong emphasis on youth leadership, empowering children to present their research and act as leaders during river activities. The program offers a diverse educational scope—ranging from local ecology and evolutionary history to astronomy and problem-solving framework workshops—while fostering a multi-generational community through active parental and adult participation.

=== New Zealand ===
In New Zealand, the Department of Conservation (DOC) partners with private organizations to run children's conservation initiatives such as "Toyota Kiwi Guardians." Children complete outdoor missions and environmental challenges across national parks and protected areas to earn physical wooden medals and certificates. The initiative encourages families to connect with nature while fostering an understanding of native species preservation.

=== Europe ===
In Europe, the EUROPARC Federation oversees the "Junior Ranger Programme" across protected areas in multiple countries. Aimed primarily at youth aged 12 to 18, participants assist park rangers with practical conservation tasks, habitat management, and environmental monitoring. The federation also organizes international camps, promoting cross-border networking and cooperation among young environmental stewards across Europe.
