= Tokyo Kasei University =

Coordinates: 35°45′17.6″N 139°43′11.8″E

- 東京家政大学
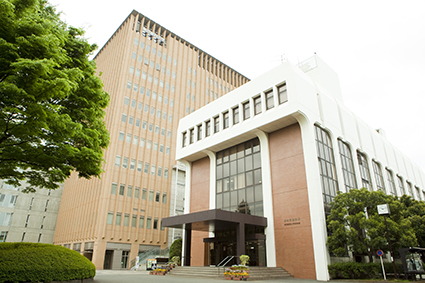
- Type: Private
- Established: 1881
- Students: 6,876 (as of 2019)
- Undergraduates: 6,801 (as of 2019)
- Postgraduates: 75 (as of 2019)
- Other students: 444 Junior College (as of 2016)
- Location: Itabashi, Tokyo, Kaga 1-18-1, Tokyo, Japan
- Campus: Tokyo and Saitama
- Website: www.tokyo-kasei.ac.jp

Tokyo Kasei University (東京家政大学, Tōkyō kasei daigaku) is a private university in Itabashi, Tokyo, Japan, established in 1949. The predecessor of the school was founded in 1881.

Tokyo Kasei University is a women's university, with a focus on education in the fields of home economics, the humanities, nursing, and child development.

== History ==
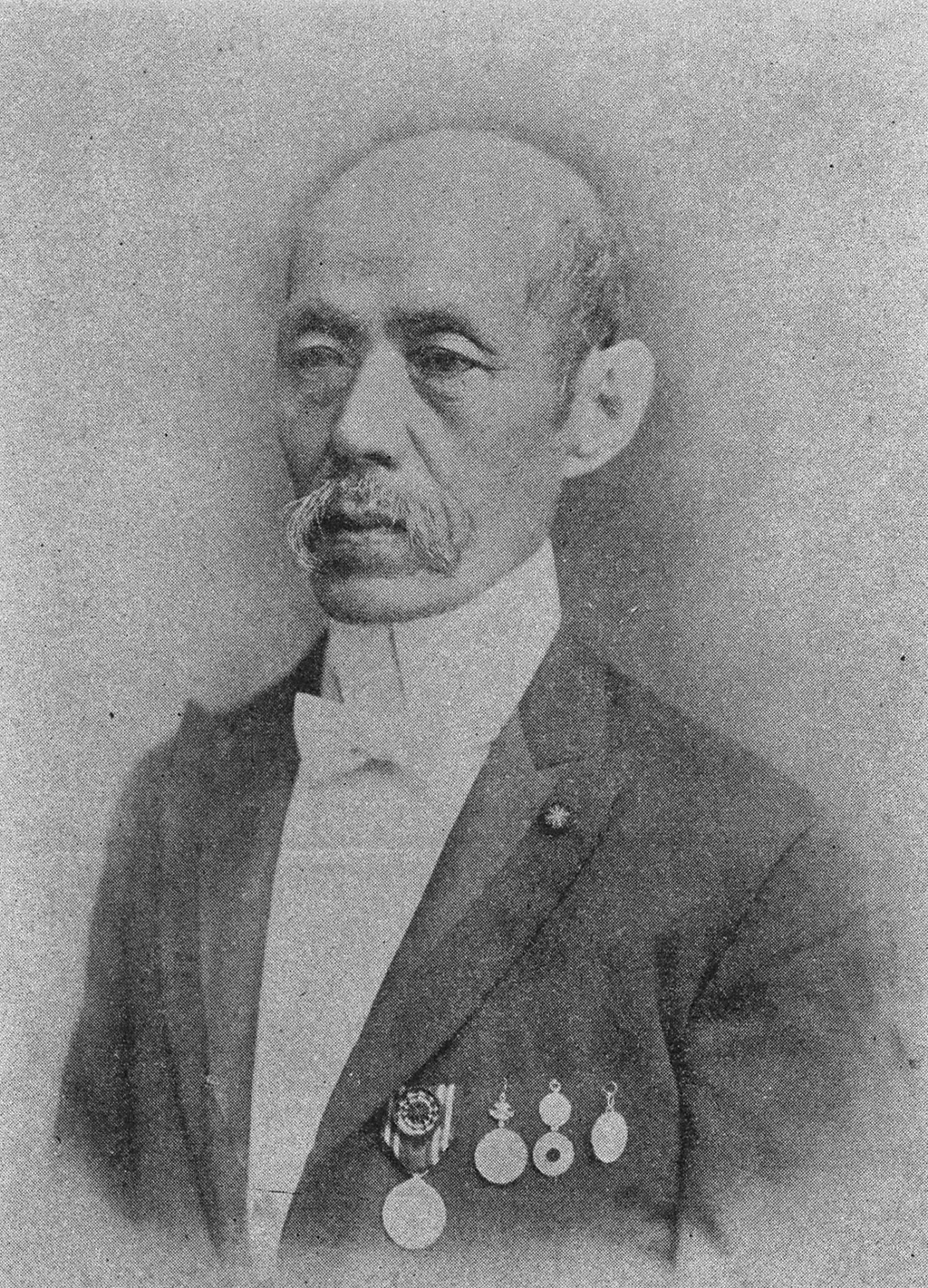
Watanabe Tatsugoro

Tokyo Kasei University was founded during the Meiji Era by Tatsugoro Watanabe, an educator born in Chiba prefecture, Japan. The university began as a sewing school called Wayo Saihou Denshujo (The School for Japanese and Western Seamstress Techniques), with the intention of helping young women to gain academic knowledge and skills in a time when half as many women as men attended school. Tatsugoro Watanabe taught sewing, along with basic academic skills, including reading, writing, and mathematics. In 1949, the school gained university status, and celebrated its 135th anniversary in 2016. The motto of the university is "Affection, Diligence, and Intelligence", and dates from 1951 when it was chosen by former president Seishiro Aoki. Tokyo Kasei University maintains its identity as a women's university, encouraging the autonomy and promotion of women in society.

== Facilities ==
=== Campuses ===
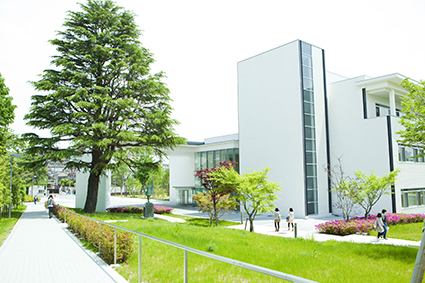
Itabashi campus

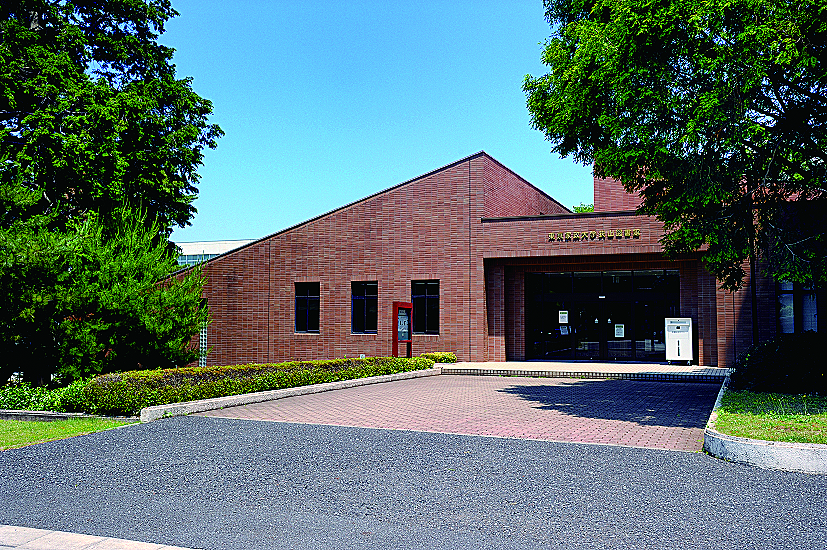
Sayama campus

Tokyo Kasei University has two campuses - one in Itabashi, Tokyo and a second in Sayama, Saitama prefecture. The Itabashi campus has a dormitory available to students, and also contains the library and the main administration offices. The Sayama campus is mostly used as a venue for short-term courses designed for local communities, in-service courses for local teachers, various extended education programs, and also several extra curriculum activities for regular students from the Itabashi campus.

=== Library ===
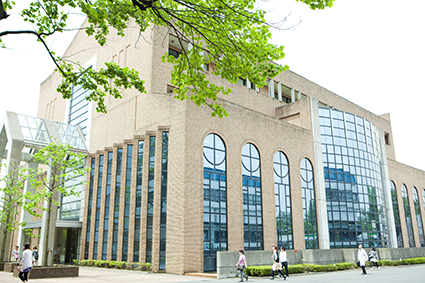
Tokyo Kasei University Library

The Tokyo Kasei University library contains over 440,000 volumes, mostly related to home economics and the humanities. It has books in Japanese and in various foreign languages, including English. The library also gives students access to electronic journals though the computer system.

=== Museum ===
The Itabashi campus contains the Tokyo Kasei University Museum, with collections of documents and costumes taken from various periods throughout Japanese history. The museum also contains Guatemalan and Taiwanese costumes, and Indonesian Wayang dolls. Many items held in the museum have been designated as significant tangible folk cultural assets of the country. The museum is housed in the hundredth anniversary building, and also produces its own journal.

=== Lifelong Study Center ===
The Lifelong Study Center at Tokyo Kasei University was founded in 1997, and is available to members of the local community for ongoing and adult education. More than 80 courses are available in a number of fields, including language learning, healthcare, and sports.

=== Global Education Center ===
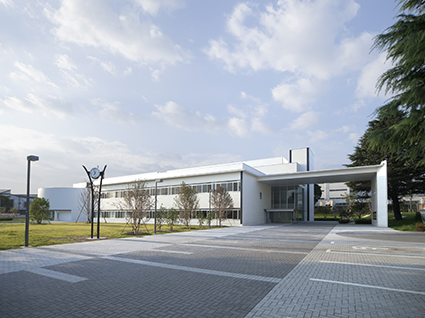
Itabashi campus

The Global Education Centre was founded in 2019, and replaced the International Studies Center, which was in operation from 1993. The Global Education Centre manages the English education programs and international affairs of Tokyo Kasei University, Tokyo Kasei Junior College, and the attached high school. The Global Education Center organises study abroad for students from the university, as well as supporting international students studying at TKU. It maintains relationships with several universities around the world, including institutions in the United States, Canada, The United Kingdom, and New Zealand.

== Structure and Organisation ==
=== Faculties ===
The university has four faculties:

Faculty of Home Economics

- Department of Juvenile Education
- Department of Child Education
- Department of Food and Nutrition
- Department of Costume and Clothing
- Department of Environmental Science and Education
- Department of Art and Design

Faculty of Humanities

- Department of English Communication
- Department of Psychological Counseling
- Department of Social Education and Welfare

Faculty of Nursing

- Department of Nursing
- Department of Rehabilitation

Faculty of Child studies

- Department of Education for Childcare

=== Graduate school ===
The graduate school of Tokyo Kasei University was reorganised in 2012 into the Graduate School of Humanities and Life Sciences. Through the graduate school, students can study:

- MA Child Care, Education and Science
- MA Health and Nutrition
- MA Clothing and Art
- MA English Language and Culture
- MA Clinical Psychology
- MA Education and Social Welfare.

The graduate school also offers a PhD program in Human Life Sciences.

=== Junior College ===
Tokyo Kasei University’s junior college offers two-year associate degrees in Early Childhood Education and Food and Nutrition.

== Academic Profile ==
Tokyo Kasei University is ranked at number 106 among private universities, and number 254 among all universities in Japan, as of 2017.
