= Kurihara Site =

Archaeological site in Tokyo, Japan

- 栗原遺跡 (Japanese)
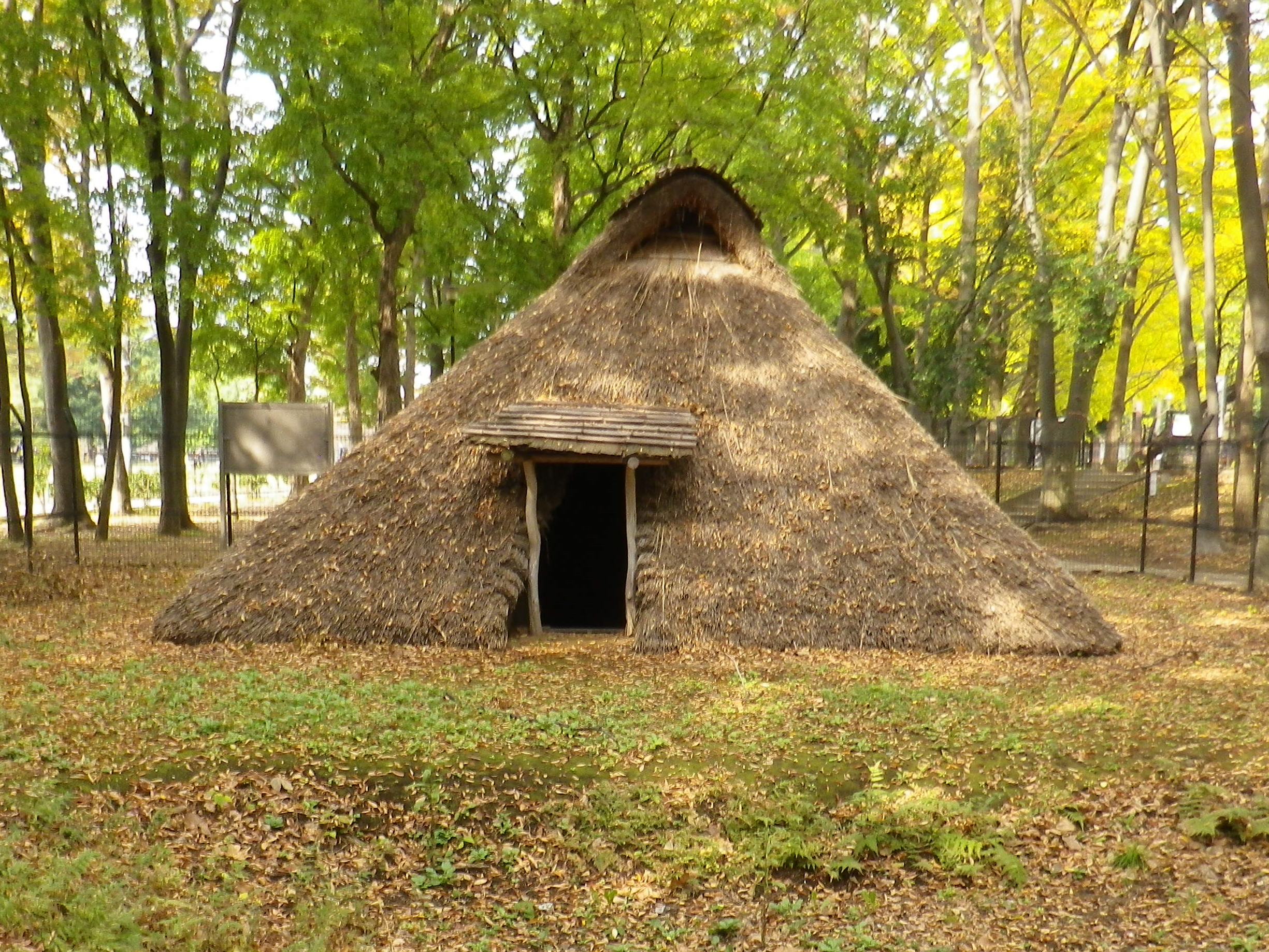
- Reconstructed pit dwelling at the site
- Interactive map of Kurihara Site
- 35°45′16.877″N 139°40′20.442″E
- Type: Archaeological site
- Periods: Japanese Paleolithic to Heian period
- Location: Nerima Ward, Tokyo, Japan

Site notes
- Owner: Public
- Public access: Limited

The Kurihara Site (栗原遺跡, Kurihara iseki), also referred to as the Kurihara ruins, is an archaeological site located within Jōhoku-Chūō Park in Nerima Ward, Tokyo, Japan. The site contains remains from multiple periods, including the Paleolithic, Jōmon, Yayoi, and Heian period.

A reconstructed pit-house from the early Nara period stands on the site, which has been designated a historic site of Nerima Ward.

== History ==
The site was excavated in 1955 during the construction of athletic facilities associated with Rikkyo University (立教大学, Rikkyō daigaku). The name “Kurihara” derives from a former local administrative unit in the area.

Archaeological investigations conducted between 1955 and 1956 uncovered obsidian stone tools in the red Kantō Plain loam, indicating occupation during the Paleolithic. Jōmon pottery was also recovered, and the site shows evidence of habitation from the Yayoi through the Heian period.

The reconstructed dwelling represents a pit-house from the early 8th century, during the Nara period. It was designed in 1957 by Gaijiro Fujishima, then a professor at the University of Tokyo.

== Location ==
The site is situated within Jōhoku-Chūō Park, a large public park spanning parts of Nerima and Itabashi wards in Tokyo. It lies in a wooded area of the park, where a reconstructed pit dwelling and explanatory signage mark its location. Access to the structure itself is generally restricted in order to preserve the site.

== Structure ==
The remains of the dwelling were excavated to a depth of approximately 50 cm, revealing four post holes and associated artifacts, including pottery.

The reconstruction uses Japanese zelkova for the main pillar and Japanese cedar for beams and structural elements. The reconstructed pit-house is enclosed within a fenced area, and visitors are not permitted to enter the site.

== Gallery ==
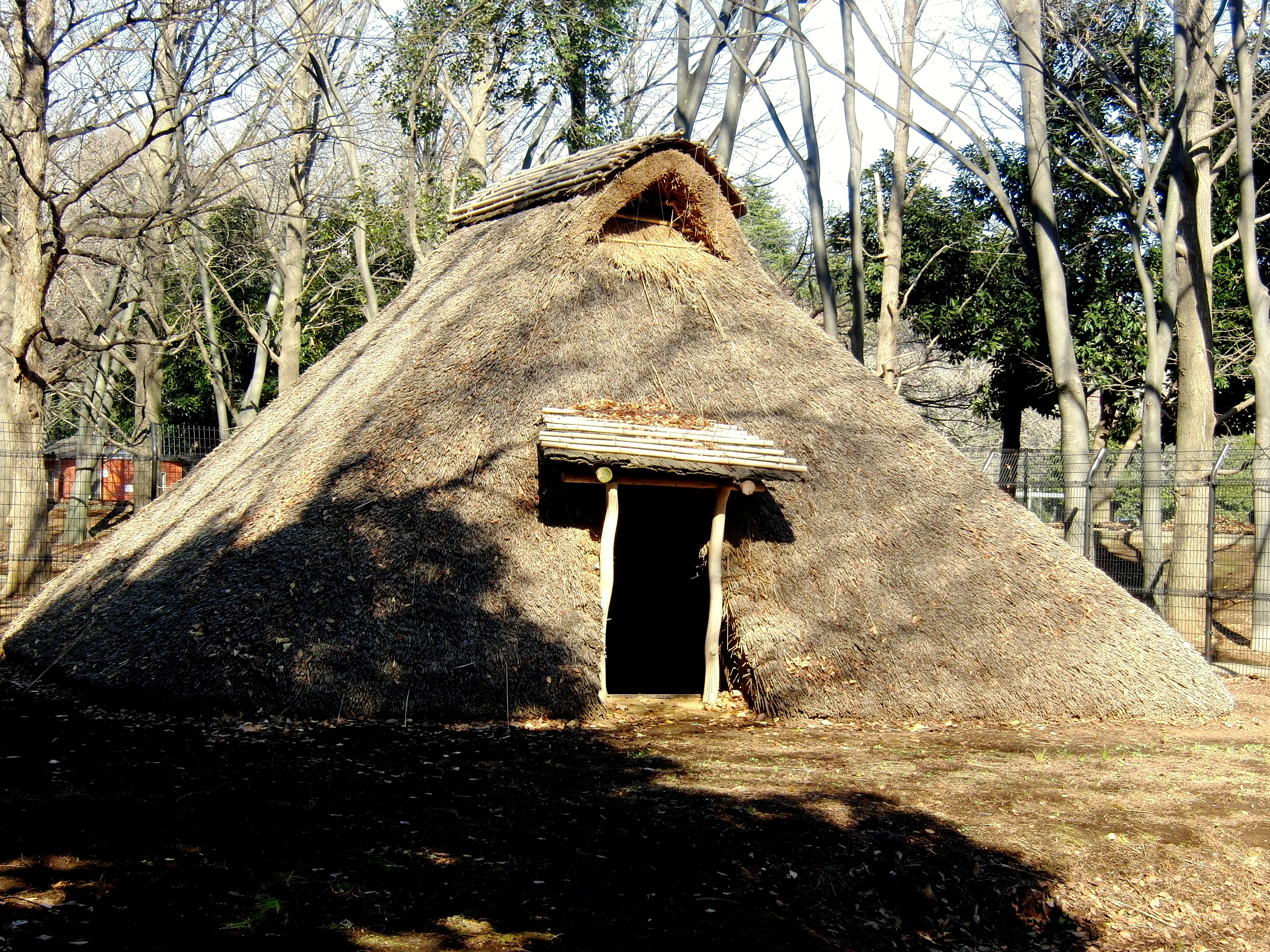

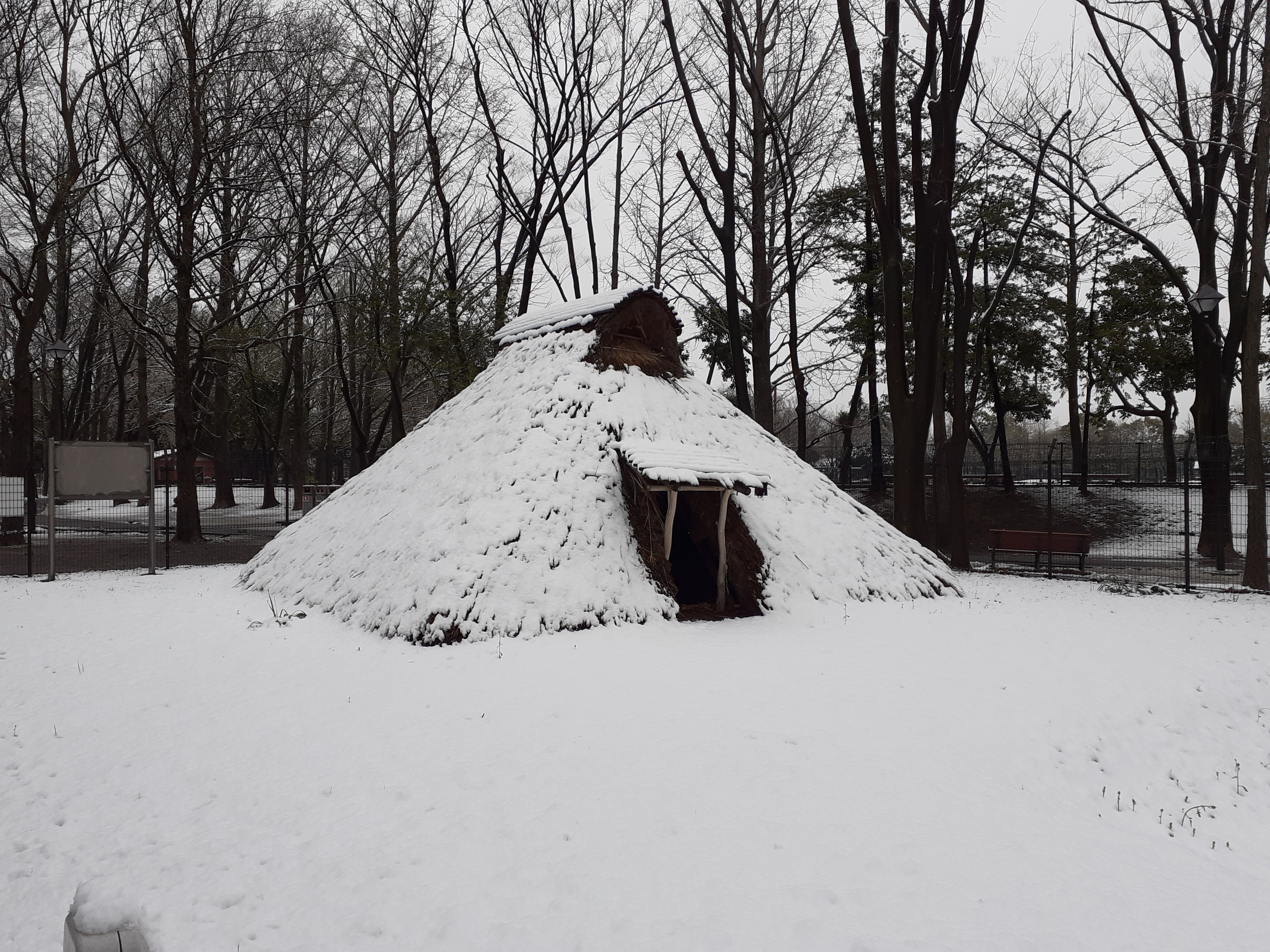
Covered in snow in March 2020

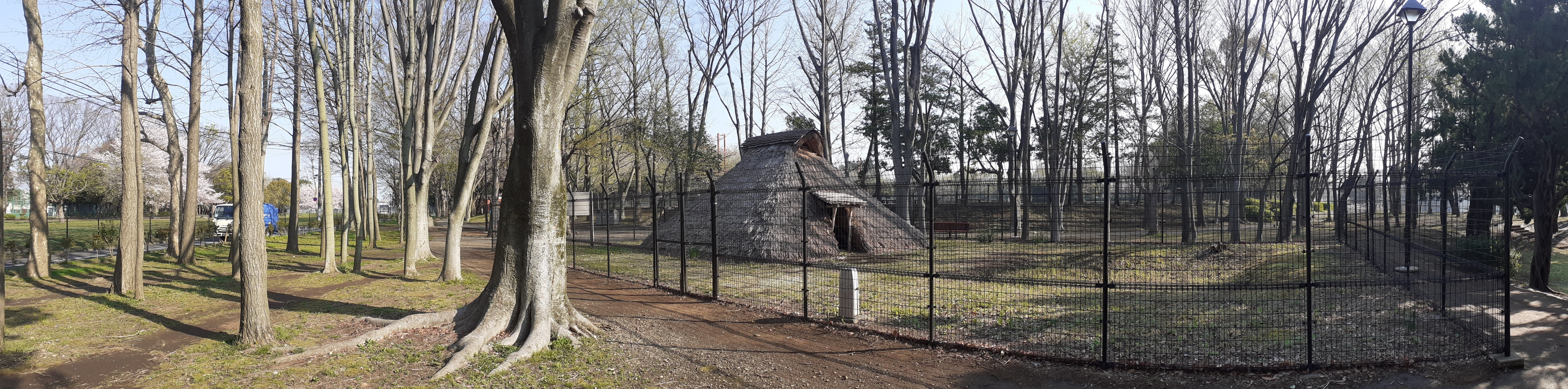
Panorama of the site

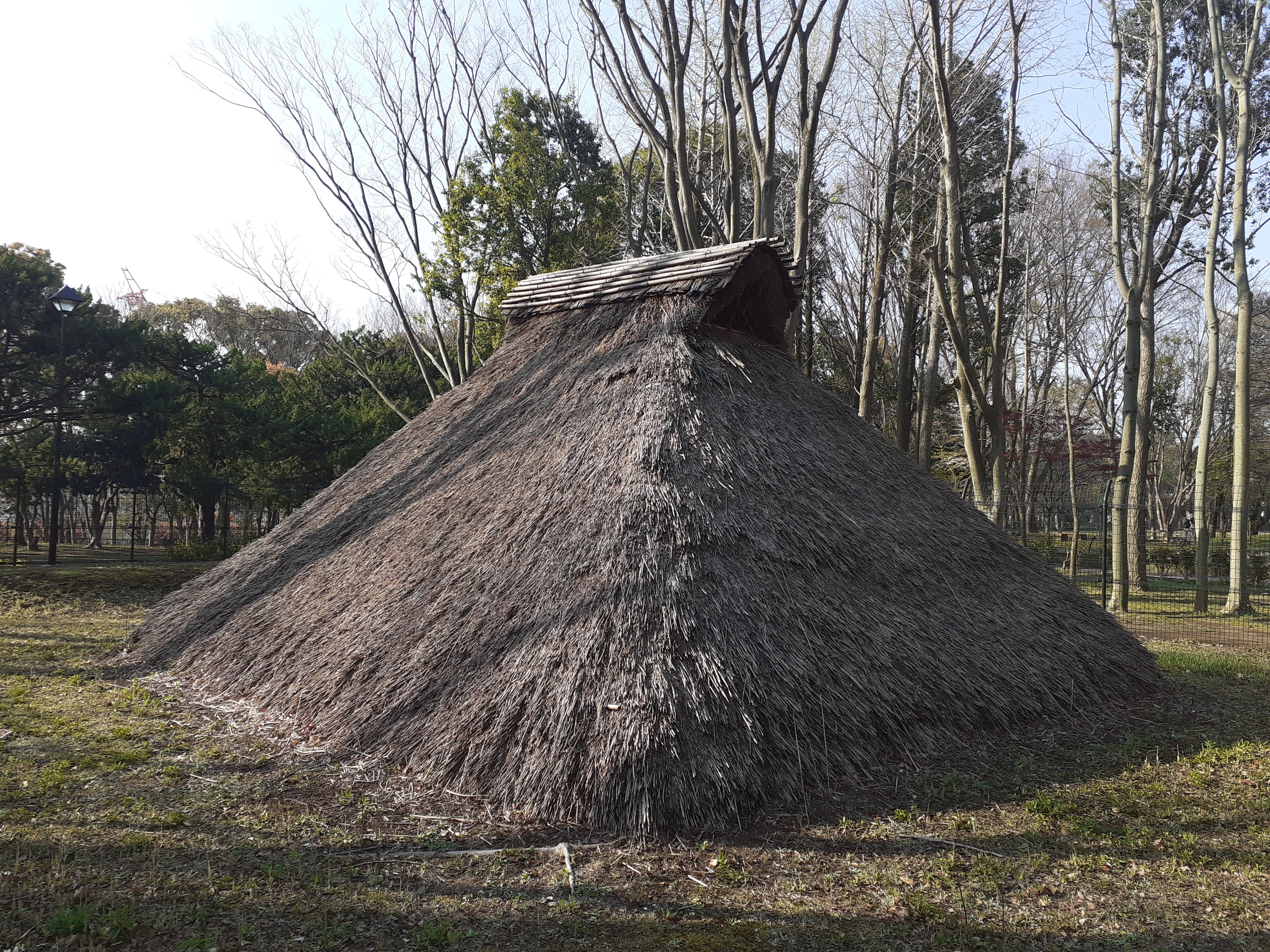
Rear (north side)

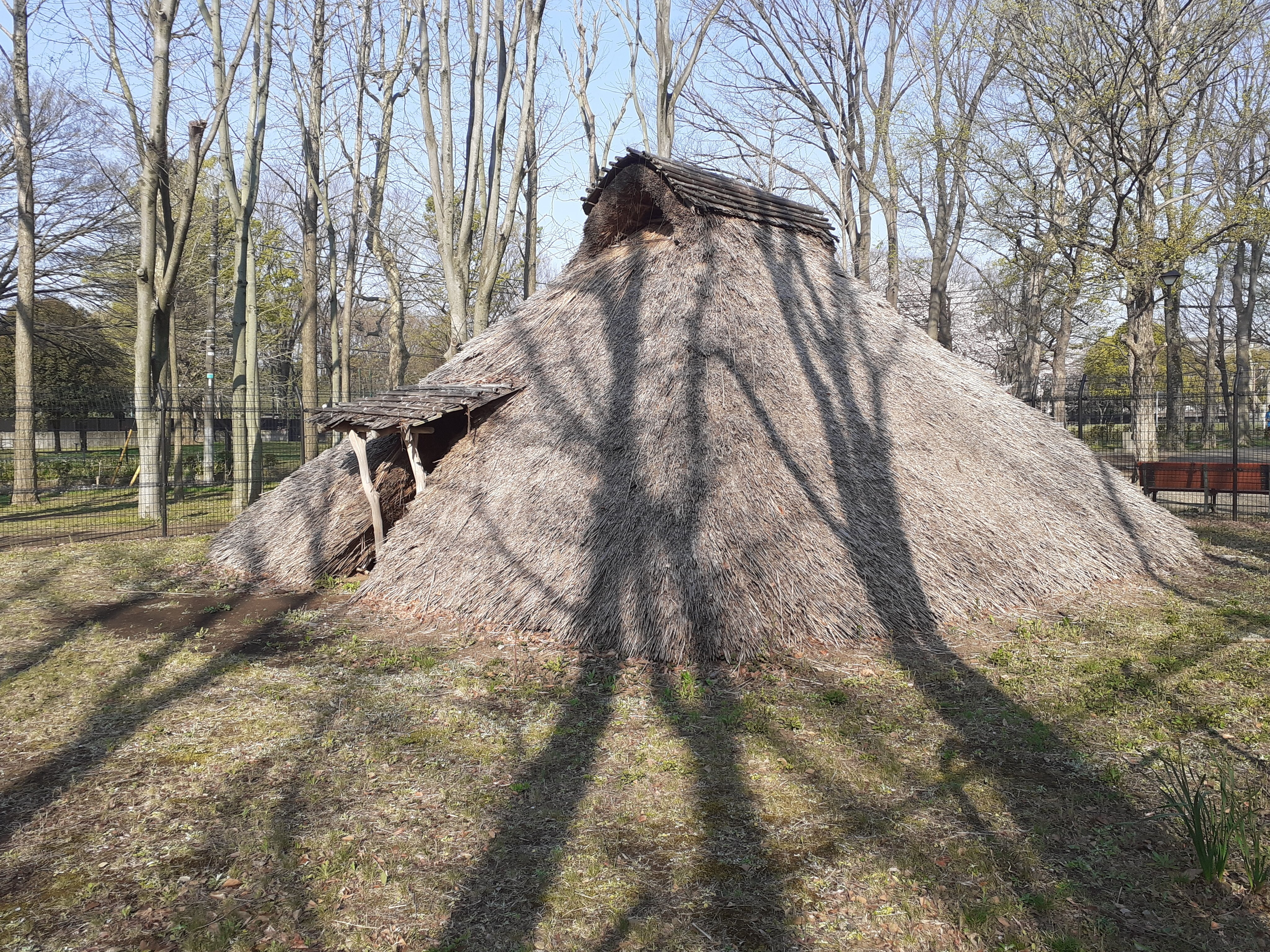
East side
