= Gaijiro Fujishima =

- 藤島亥治郎
- Born: 1 May 1899; Morioka, Iwate Prefecture, Japan
- Died: 15 July 2002 (aged 103)
- Occupations: Architectural historian, college professor

Gaijiro Fujishima (藤島亥治郎, Fujishima Gaijirō) (1 May 1899 – 15 July 2002), was a Japanese architectural historian and professor at the University of Tokyo. His son, Yukihiko Fujishima, is a lecturer at Waseda University.

== Early life and education ==
He was born in Morioka, Iwate Prefecture, in 1899. He graduated from the Graduate School of Engineering at the University of Tokyo in 1920. He became an associate professor at the University of Tokyo in 1929, and professor in 1933. He designed the Kurihara Ruins in Tokyo in 1957. In the late 1950s and early 1960s he directed excavations at Chūson-ji and Mōtsu-ji, both Buddhist temple complexes in Iwate Prefecture. He retired in 1960, and became Professor Emeritus of the University of Tokyo.

== Books ==
- A history of Korean art, published in "Architectural Magazine" edition 530-536 (1930)
- Taiwanese Architecture (1948)
- Japanese Architecture (1958)
