= Tsubasa Akimoto =

Japanese actress

- 秋本つばさ
- Born: September 29, 1974 (age 52); Itabashi, Tokyo, Japan

Tsubasa Akimoto (秋本つばさ, Akimoto Tsubasa; born September 29, 1974) is a Japanese actress.
