= Itabashi Bridge =

Bridge in Itabashi, Tokyo, Japan

Coordinates: 35°45′26.3″N 139°42′32″E

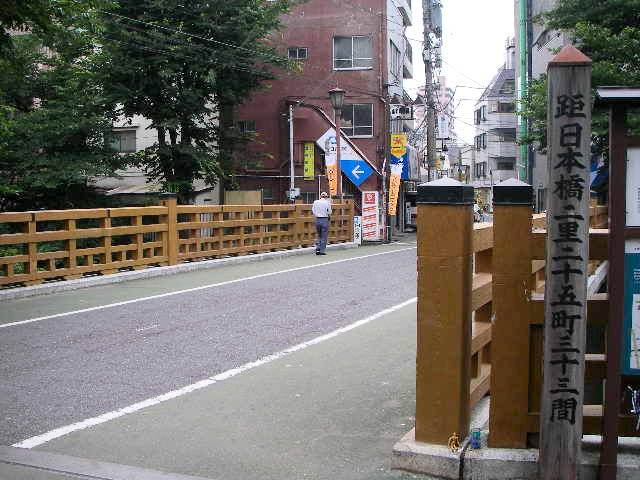
The bridge in 2006

Itabashi Bridge (板橋, Itabashi) (literally, "plank bridge") is a bridge spanning the Shakujii River in Nakajuku, Itabashi, Tokyo, Japan. It is widely regarded as the origin of the name of Itabashi ("plank bridge"), from which Itabashi Ward takes its name.

== Overview ==
The bridge is located along the route of the historic Nakasendō, one of the five major highways of the Edo period. The surrounding area is known for rows of cherry blossom trees along the Shakujii River, and the site has been selected as one of the "Itabashi Ten Views" (板橋十景).

== History ==
A wooden bridge is believed to have existed at this location since at least the medieval period, and references to "Itabashi" appear in historical sources. According to local historical accounts, the name derives from a simple plank bridge (板橋) that once crossed the river. During the Edo period, the bridge formed part of the Nakasendō route and developed as a crossing point within the post town of Itabashi.
