= Itabashi (surname) =

Itabashi (written: 板橋) is a Japanese surname. Notable people with the surname include:

- Fumio Itabashi (板橋 文夫, born 1949), Japanese jazz pianist and composer
- Kōshū Itabashi (板橋 興宗, 1927–2020), Japanese Zen Buddhist
- Megumi Itabashi (板橋 恵, born 1973), Japanese volleyball player
- Toru Itabashi (板橋 亨, born 1946), Japanese ice hockey player

== See also ==
- 板橋 (disambiguation)
