= Shakujii River =

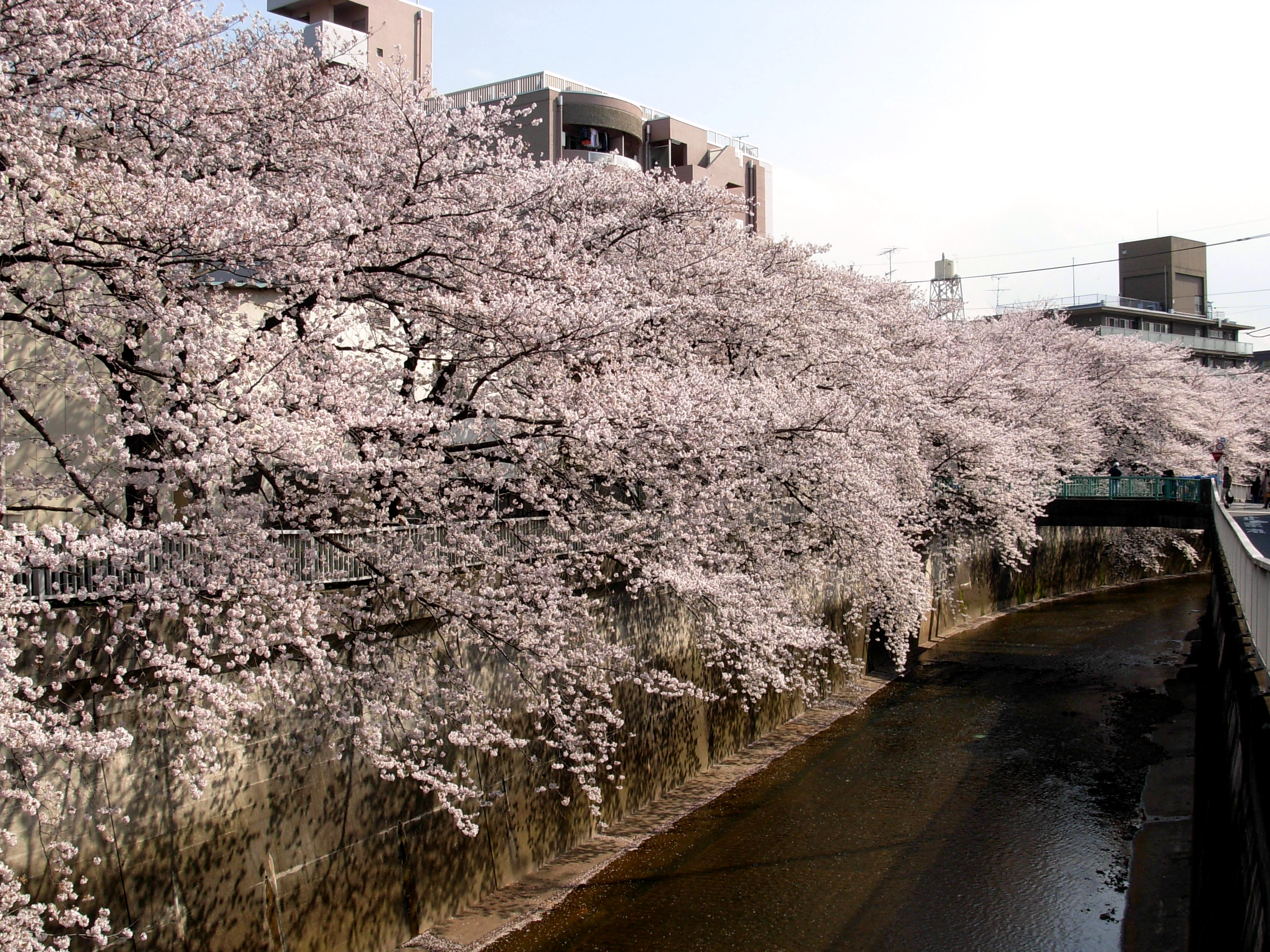
- Shakujii River and cherry blossoms in Nerima Ward

- Location within Japan

Location
- Country: Japan

Physical characteristics
- Source
  - location: Kodaira, Tokyo
- Mouth
  - location: Sumida River, Kita-ku, Tokyo
- Length: 25.2 km (15.7 mi)

The Shakujii River (石神井川, Shakujii-gawa) is a class A river which flows through the northwest quadrant of central Tokyo, Japan.

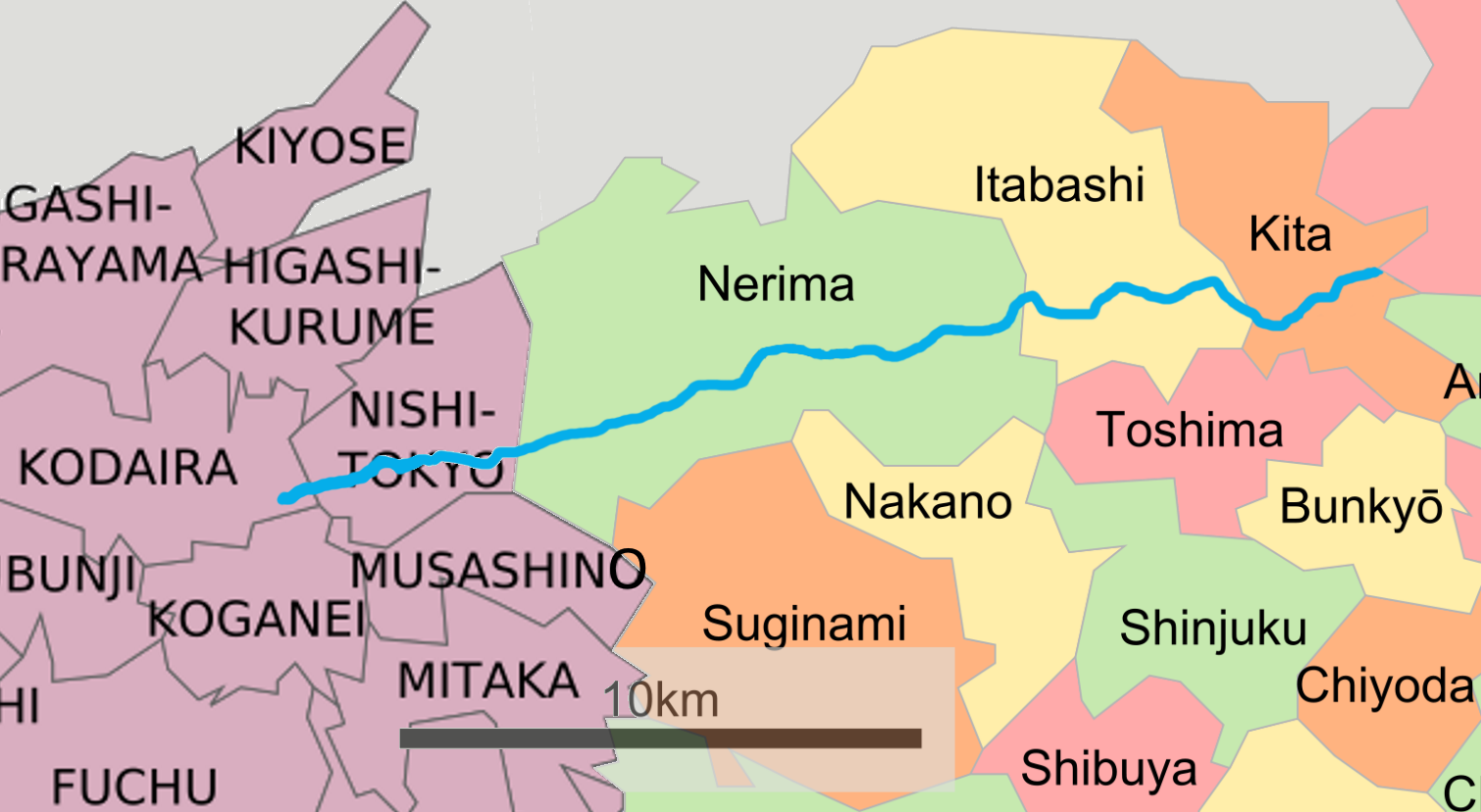
Approximate course in Tokyo. The cities in Tokyo are shown to the left in pink, while the special wards of Tokyo are shown to the right in colour.

== Course ==
The Shakujii River is one of the tributaries of the Arakawa River. With a total length of 25.2 kilometres (15.7 mi) and a drainage basin of 61.6 square kilometres (23.8 sq mi), it is categorized as a Class A river by the Japanese government.

It springs up in Koganei Park in the district of Hana-koganei-minami-chō, in the city of Kodaira. It then flows in an easterly direction through the city of Nishitōkyō. Next, it continues through the special wards of Tokyo of Nerima-ku, Itabashi-ku and Kita-ku. At Horifune, Kita-ku, it empties into the Sumida River.

== Bridges ==
The Shakujii River has 66 bridges over its upstream portion. There are 62 over its middle basin. And there are 66 bridges over its downstream portion. This makes for a total of 194 bridges.

The famous wooden plank bridge for which Itabashi-ku is named crossed the Shakujii at Nakajuku. The bridge has now been replaced by a modern ferroconcrete one called Ita Bridge.

== Uses and Human Impact ==
=== Historical Uses ===
Historically, the Shakujii River played a vital role as an agricultural water source for the surrounding region. From the Edo period through the Meiji era, its water was used extensively for irrigation, while also serving as a key power source for local industries such as flour milling, copper rolling, and papermaking through the use of waterwheels.

=== Flood Control and River Management ===
Following the rapid urbanization during Japan's post-war economic growth, the river underwent extensive revetment works and channel straightening to mitigate severe flood risks. To manage modern localized rainstorms, underground retention basins have been developed along the basin. Additionally, river management initiatives—including sewerage network improvements and the introduction of highly treated wastewater—have been implemented to restore clean water flow and improve overall water quality.

=== Recreation, Urban Greenery, and Environmental Education ===
In modern times, the Shakujii River serves as an essential green space and recreational corridor for urban residents, connected by a network of parks and walking paths such as Johoku Chuo Park and Shakujii Park. The cherry blossom trees line the riverbanks, attracting local residents and visitors during the spring season.

Beyond passive recreation, the river is utilized as an active site for community-based environmental education. A notable example is the "Nerima Junior Ranger" (ねりまジュニアレンジャー) program. Unlike the official, badge-based Junior Ranger programs administered by agencies such as the U.S. National Park Service, this initiative functions as a grass-roots, community-driven educational group. Through hands-on activities along the Shakujii River—such as water quality monitoring, ecological surveys, and river cleanups—children, parents, and local residents together learn about urban river ecosystems and environmental stewardship.

== Coordinates ==
River source: 35°43′12″N 139°31′06″E

Confluence with Sumida River: 35°45′28″N 139°44′52″E

== Gallery ==
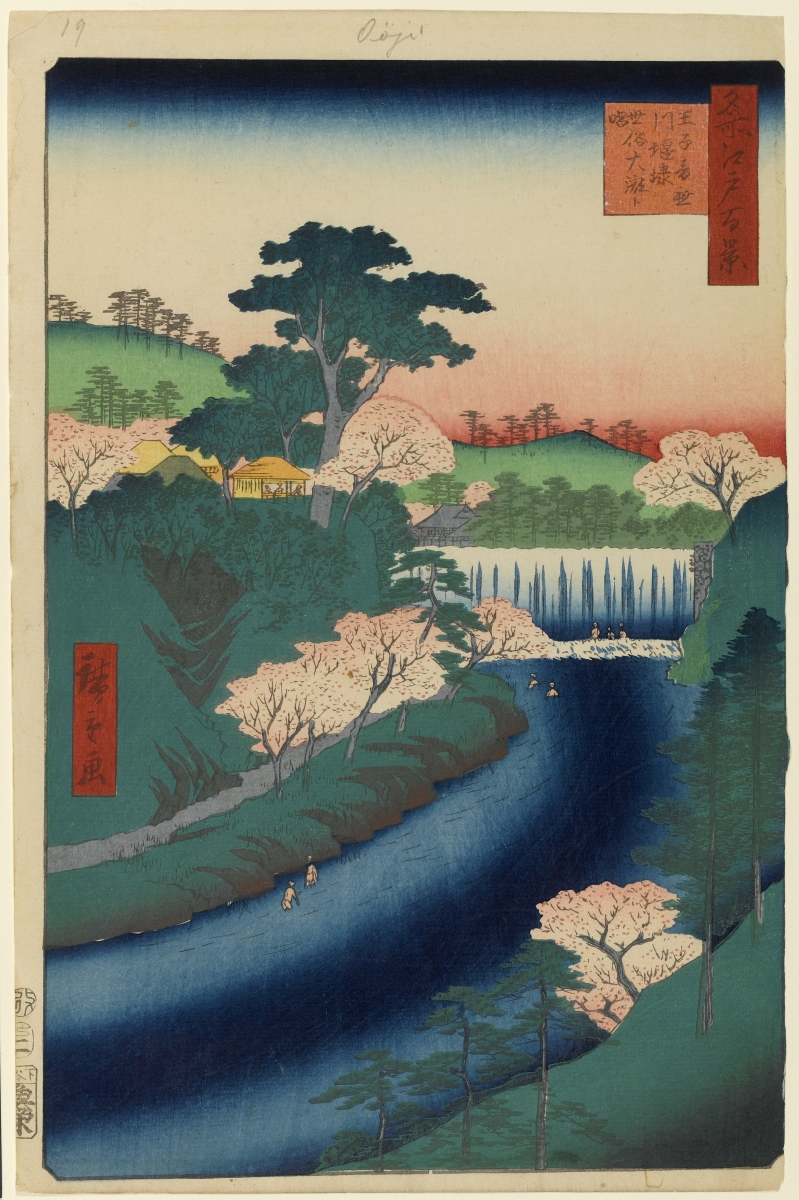
Painting of the river by Hiroshige

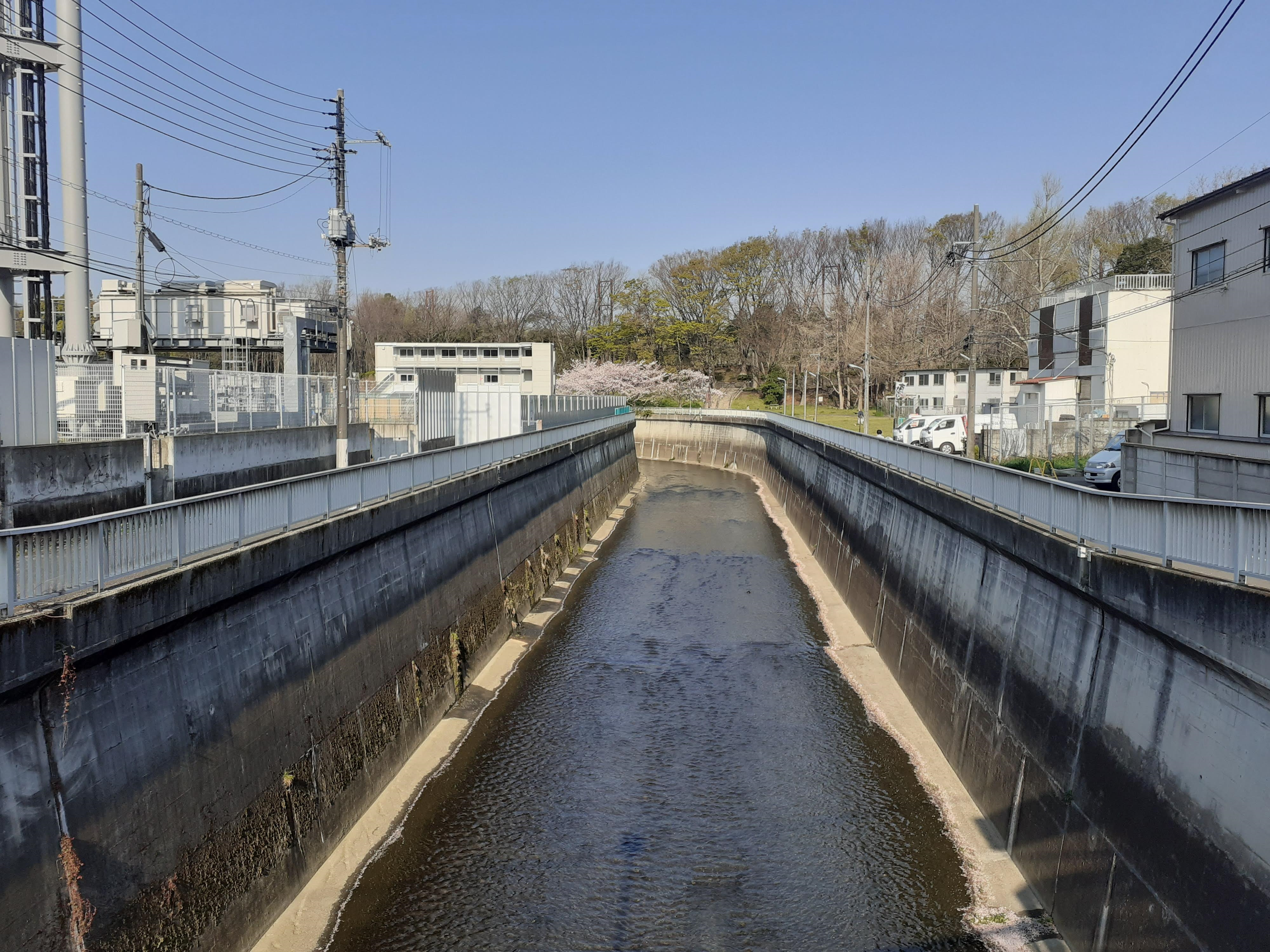
The river in Itabashi Ward as seen from Kurihara Bridge (くりはら橋)
