= Banqiao Town =

Banqiao (板桥镇) may refer to the following towns in China:

- Banqiao, Fengyang County, Anhui
- Banqiao, Shou County, in Shou County, Anhui
- Banqiao, Chongqing, in Yongchuan District, Chongqing
- Banqiao Town, Linze County, in Linze County, Gansu
- Banqiao, Pan County, in Pan County, Guizhou
- Banqiao, Zunyi, in Huichuan District, Zunyi, Guizhou
- Banqiao, Biyang County, in Biyang County, Henan
- Banqiao, Taikang County, in Taikang County, Henan
- Banqiao, Enshi City, in Enshi City, Hubei
- Banqiao, Nanzhang County, in Nanzhang County, Hubei
- Banqiao, Changning, Hunan, in Changning City, Hunan
- Banqiao Town, Shangluo, in Shangzhou District, Shangluo, Shaanxi
- Banqiao, Mianzhu, in Mianzhu City, Sichuan
- Banqiao, Fushun County, Sichuan, in Fushun County, Sichuan
- Banqiao, Ninghe County, in Ninghe County, Tianjin
- Banqiao, Luliang County, in Luliang County, Yunnan
- Banqiao, Luoping County, in Luoping County, Yunnan
- Banqiao, Xuanwei, in Xuanwei City, Yunnan
- Banqiao, Lin'an, in Lin'an City, Zhejiang
