= Banqiao Township =

Banqiao Township (板桥乡) may refer to the following locations:

== Mainland China ==
- Banqiao Township, Ningguo, in Ningguo City, Anhui
- Banqiao Township, Xiuning County, Anhui
- Banqiao Township, Youyang County, in Youyang Tujia and Miao Autonomous County, Chongqing
- Banqiao Township, Heshui County, in Heshui County, Gansu
- Banqiao Township, Linze County, in Linze County, Gansu
- Banqiao Township, Wuzhong, in Litong District, Wuzhong, Gansu
- Banqiao Township, Zhijin County, in Zhijin County, Guizhou
- Banqiao Township, Sinan County, Guizhou, in Sinan County, Guizhou
- Banqiao Township, Chenxi County, in Chenxi County, Hunan
- Banqiao Township, Guiyang County, in Guiyang County, Hunan
- Banqiao Township, Shaoyang, in Daxiang District, Shaoyang, Hunan
- Banqiao Township, Hancheng, in Hancheng City, Shaanxi
- Banqiao Township, Shangluo, in Shangzhou District, Shangluo, Shaanxi
- Banqiao Township, Pengxi County, in Pengxi County, Sichuan
- Banqiao Township, Qingchuan County, in Qingchuan County, Sichuan
- Banqiao Township, Qu County, in Qu County, Sichuan
- Banqiao Township, Renshou County, in Renshou County, Sichuan
- Banqiao Township, Yilong County, in Yilong County, Sichuan
- Banqiao Township, Yuexi County, Sichuan, in Yuexi County, Sichuan

== Taiwan ==
- The former Banqiao Township in Taipei County, Taiwan Province, R.O.C.
