= Pangyo County =

Coordinates: 38.752°N 127.002°E

P'an'gyo County 판교군
- County

Korean transcription(s)
  - Chosŏn'gŭl: 판교군
  - Hancha: 板橋郡
  - McCune-Reischauer: P'an'gyo-gun
  - Revised Romanization: Pangyo-gun
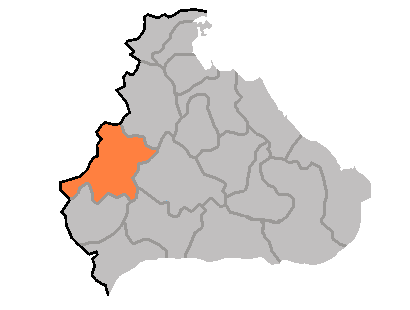
- Map of Kangwon showing the location of Pangyo
- Country: North Korea
- Province: Kangwŏn Province
- Administrative divisions: 1 ŭp, 22 ri

Area
  - Total: 623 km^{2} (241 sq mi)

Population (2008 census)
  - Total: 47,031
  - Density: 75.5/km^{2} (196/sq mi)

P'an'gyo County is a kun, or county, in Kangwŏn province, North Korea. In December 1952, during the Korean War, P'an'gyo was formed as a separate county from five myŏn (Nagyang, Pangjang, P'an'gyo, Ryongp'o, Sannae) of Ichŏn-gun and Yujin-myŏn of P'yŏnggang-gun. Myŏn were administrative units below county (kun) level and are no longer used in North Korea.

== Physical features ==
The land of P'an'gyo is predominantly mountainous, with the Ahobiryŏng Mountains (아호비령산맥; 阿虎飛嶺山脈) and Masingryŏng Mountains (마식령산맥; 馬息嶺山脈) both passing through the county. The highest point is Tongbaengnyŏnsan (동백년산). The county's chief stream is the Rimjin River. Approximately 88% of the county's area is forestland.

== Administrative divisions ==
P'an'gyo county is divided into 1 ŭp (town) and 22 ri (villages):

- P'an'gyo-ŭp
- Chiha-ri
- Chisang-ri
- Ch'ŏnam-ri
- Hasinwŏl-li
- Kaeryŏl-li
- Kubong-ri
- Kudang-ri
- Kŭmp'yŏng-ri
- Kunhal-li
- Kyŏngdo-ri
- Myŏngdŏng-ri
- P'unghyŏl-li
- Riha-ri
- Risang-ri
- Ryongch'ŏl-li
- Ryongdang-ri
- Ryonghŭng-ri
- Ryongji-ri
- Ryongp'o-ri
- Sadong-ri
- Sangdu-ri
- Sangsinwŏl-li

== Economy ==
=== Agriculture ===
Agriculture is difficult due to the rugged terrain; however, crops are raised here including maize, potatoes, soybeans, wheat, and barley. Orcharding and livestock farming also play a role.

=== Mining ===
Mining is supported by local deposits of copper and nickel.

== Transport ==
P'an'gyo county is served by roads and by several stations on the Ch'ŏngnyŏn Ich'ŏn line of the Korean State Railway.

== See also ==
- Geography of North Korea
- Administrative divisions of North Korea
- Kangwon (North Korea)
