= Itabashi =

Itabashi 板橋区
- Special ward
- Itabashi City
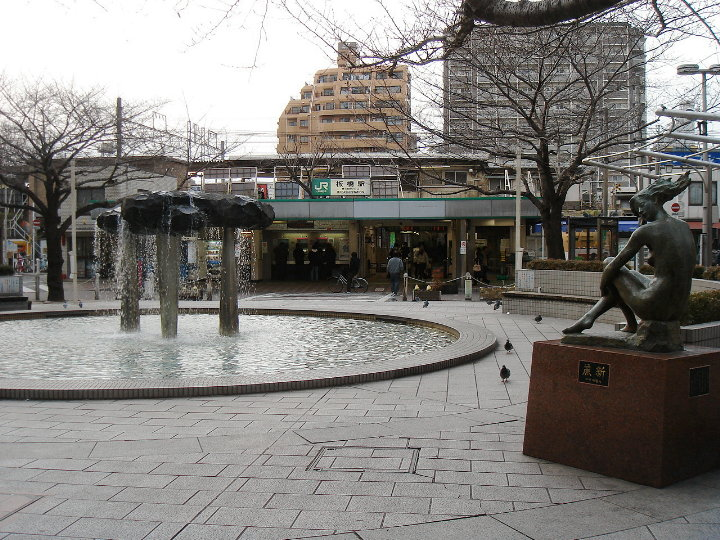
- The east exit of Itabashi Station

- Flag Emblem

- Location of Itabashi in Tokyo Metropolis

- Location in Japan
- Coordinates: 35°46′N 139°41′E
- Country: Japan
- Region: Kantō
- Prefecture: Tokyo Metropolis
- First recorded: 990 AD
- As merged with Tokyo City: October 1, 1932
- As special ward of Tokyo: July 1, 1943

Government
  - Mayor: Takeshi Sakamoto (since April 2007)

Area
  - Total: 32.22 km^{2} (12.44 sq mi)

Population (October 1, 2020)
  - Total: 584,483
  - Density: 18,140/km^{2} (47,000/sq mi)
- Time zone: UTC+09:00 (JST)
- City hall address: Itabashi 2-66-1, Itabashi-ku, Tokyo; 173-8501
- Website: www.city.itabashi.tokyo.jp
- Symbols
- Bird: Motacilla alba
- Flower: Anemone flaccida
- Tree: Zelkova serrata

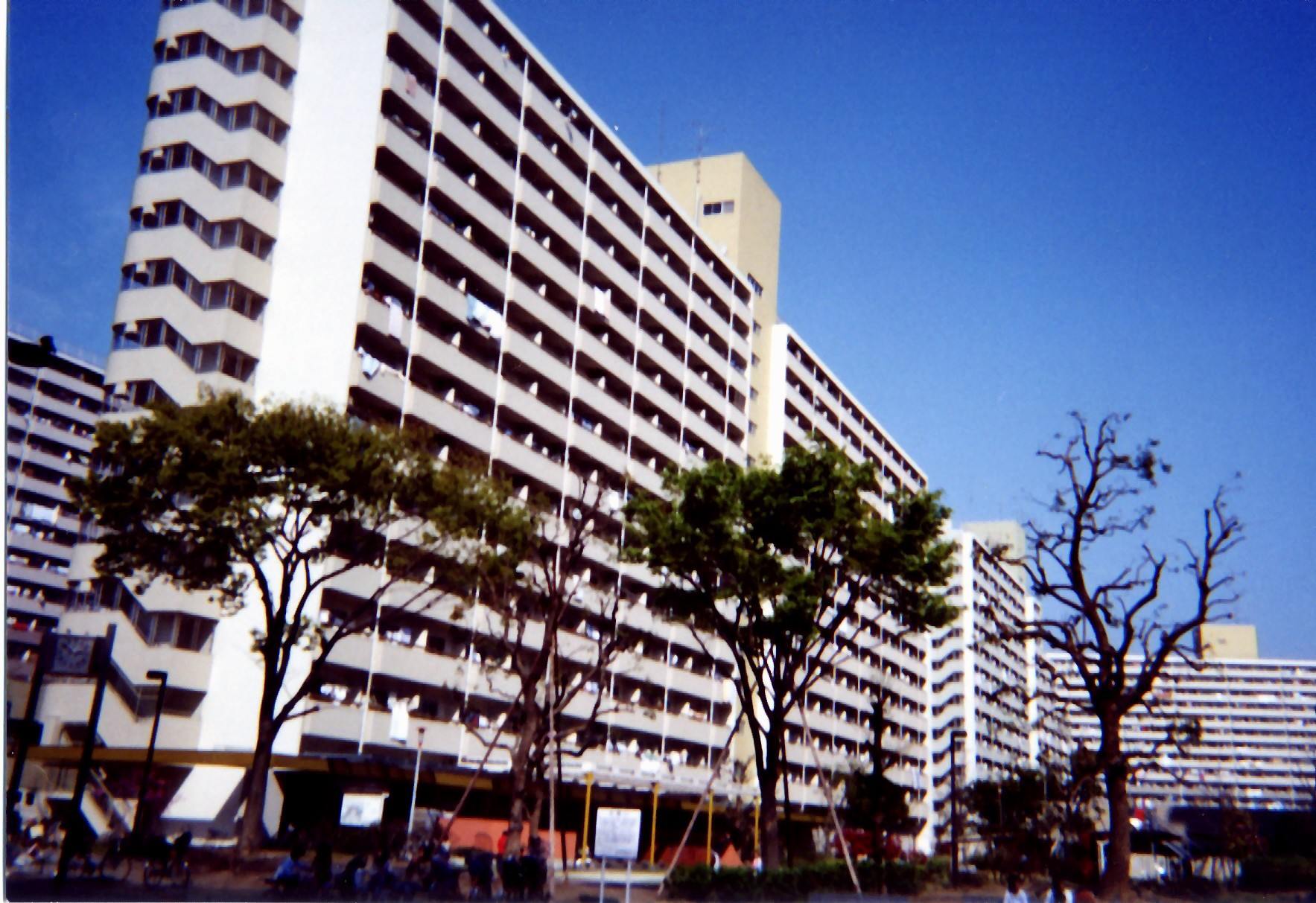
Tall apartments in Takashimadaira

Itabashi (板橋区, Itabashi-ku) Japanese pronunciation: [ì.tä́.bä̀.ɕì, -bä́.ɕi̥.kɯ̈̀] (Note: The placename is pronounced like this. The common noun meaning "plank-floored bridge" is pronounced [ì.tä́.bä́.ɕí].) is a special ward in the Tokyo Metropolis in Japan. In English, it is called Itabashi City. Itabashi has sister-city relations with Burlington, Ontario, in Canada; Shijingshan District of Beijing in the People's Republic of China; and Bologna in Italy.

As of May 1, 2015, the ward has an estimated population of 547,270, and a population density of 16,990 persons per km^{2}. The total area is 32.22 km^{2}.

== Geography ==
Itabashi lies on the Kantō plain. The Arakawa River, a major river, forms part of the boundary with Saitama Prefecture. Surrounding the ward are, in Saitama, the cities of Wakō and Toda; and in Tokyo, the wards of Nerima, Toshima, and Kita.

== Districts and neighborhoods ==
Akatsuka Area

- Akatsuka
- Akatsukashin
- Daimon
- Misono
- Narimasu
- Shingashi
- Takashimadaira^{a}
- Tokumaru
- Yotsuba

Itabashi Area

- Chūmaru
- Fujimi
- Futaba
- Hikawa
- Honchō
- Inaridai
- Itabashi
- Kaga
- Kumano
- Minami
- Nakaitabashi
- Nakajuku
- Naka
- Ōyamachō
- Ōyamahigashi
- Ōyamakanai
- Ōyamanishi
- Saiwai
- Sakae
- Yamato

Kamiitabashi Area

- Higashishin
- Higashiyama
- Kamiitabashi
- Komone
- Minamitokiwadai
- Mukaihara
- Ōyaguchi
- Ōyaguchikami
- Ōyaguchikita
- Sakuragawa
- Tokiwadai
- Yayoi

Shimura Area

- Aioi
- Azusawa
- Funado
- Hasune
- Hasunuma
- Izumi
- Maeno
- Miyamoto
- Nakadai
- Nishidai
- Ōhara
- Sakashita
- Sakogi
- Shimizu
- Shimura
- Shingashi^{b}
- Takashimadaira^{b, c}
- Wakaki

Notes:

^{a} – (2, 3, 4, 5, 6, 7, 8)
^{b} – (formerly part of Shimura Nishidai area)
^{c} – (1 & 9)

== History ==
The name of the ward means "plank bridge" and derives from the wooden span over the Shakujii River that dates from the Heian period. Such a bridge was remarkable at the time, and the name has lasted since. The current bridge in that location is made of ferroconcrete. In the Edo period, the Nakasendō crossed the nearby Shimo Itabashi, and the name came to apply to that area as well. Itabashi was one of the Four Edo Post Towns, and travellers first lodged there after leaving the shogunal capital. Kaga Domain had a mansion there. The shogunate maintained the Itabashi execution grounds at Itabashi.

On October 1, 1932, nine towns and villages of Kita-Toshima District were merged and became part of Tokyo City as Itabashi Ward. It became a special ward May 3, 1947. On August 1 of that year, the localities of Nerima, Kami-Nerima, Naka-Arai, Shakujii and Ōizumi were split off from Itabashi to create Nerima Ward.

== Demographics ==
Per Japanese census data, the population growth has remained stable since 1970.

Historical population
Year	Pop.	±%
1920	53,482	—
1930	113,586	+112.4%
1940	233,115	+105.2%
1945	217,974	−6.5%
1950	223,003	+2.3%
1960	412,605	+85.0%
1970	471,777	+14.3%
1980	498,266	+5.6%
1990	518,943	+4.1%
2000	513,575	−1.0%
2010	535,824	+4.3%
2020	584,483	+9.1%
Source: Statistics Bureau of Japan (Note: For years prior to 1930, figures cover the area of present-day Itabashi-ku.)

== Education ==
=== Universities ===
Itabashi is home to four universities. Tokyo Kasei University has a campus in the Kaga neighborhood. Also in Kaga is the main campus of Teikyo University. Daito Bunka University has one campus in Takashima-daira, and another in Higashimatsuyama, Saitama. The fourth is the medical college of Nihon University.

=== Public schools ===
Public high schools are operated by the Tokyo Metropolitan Board of Education.

- Itabashi High School
- Itabashi Yutoku High School
- Kitatoshima Technical High School
- Kitazono High School
- Ohyama High School
- Takashima High School

Public elementary and junior high schools are operated by the Itabashi City Board of Education (板橋区教育委員会).

Public junior high schools:

- Akatsuka No. 1 Junior High School (赤塚第一中学校)
- Akatsuka No. 2 Junior High School (赤塚第二中学校)
- Akatsuka No. 3 Junior High School (赤塚第三中学校)
- Itabashi No. 1 Junior High School (板橋第一中学校)
- Itabashi No. 2 Junior High School (板橋第二中学校)
- Itabashi No. 3 Junior High School (板橋第三中学校)
- Itabashi No. 5 Junior High School (板橋第五中学校)
- Kaga Junior High School (加賀中学校)
- Kami Itabashi No. 1 Junior High School (上板橋第一中学校)
- Kami Itabashi No. 2 Junior High School (上板橋第二中学校)
- Kami Itabashi No. 3 Junior High School (上板橋第三中学校)
- Nakadai Junior High School (中台中学校)
- Nishidai Junior High School (西台中学校)
- Sakuragawa Junior High School (桜川中学校)
- Shimura No. 1 Junior High School (志村第一中学校)
- Shimura No. 2 Junior High School (志村第二中学校)
- Shimura No. 3 Junior High School (志村第三中学校)
- Shimura No. 4 Junior High School (志村第四中学校)
- Shimura No. 5 Junior High School (志村第五中学校)
- Takashima No. 1 Junior High School (高島第一中学校)
- Takashima No. 2 Junior High School (高島第二中学校)
- Takashima No. 3 Junior High School (高島第三中学校)

Public elementary schools:

- Akatsuka Elementary School (赤塚小学校)
- Akatsuka Shin Elementary School (赤塚新町小学校)
- Fujimidai Elementary School (富士見台小学校)
- Funado Elementary School (舟渡小学校)
- Hasune Elementary School (蓮根小学校)
- Hasune No. 2 Elementary School (蓮根第二小学校)
- Itabashi No. 1 Elementary School (板橋第一小学校)
- Itabashi No. 2 Elementary School (板橋第二小学校)
- Itabashi No. 4 Elementary School (板橋第四小学校)
- Itabashi No. 5 Elementary School (板橋第五小学校)
- Itabashi No. 6 Elementary School (板橋第六小学校)
- Itabashi No. 7 Elementary School (板橋第七小学校)
- Itabashi No. 8 Elementary School (板橋第八小学校)
- Itabashi No. 10 Elementary School (板橋第十小学校)
- Kaga Elementary School (加賀小学校)
- Kamiitabashi Elementary School (上板橋小学校)
- Kamiitabashi No. 2 Elementary School (上板橋第二小学校)
- Kamiitabashi No. 4 Elementary School (上板橋第四小学校)
- Kanazawa Elementary School (金沢小学校)
- Kita Maeno Elementary School (北前野小学校)
- Kitano Elementary School (北野小学校)
- Kobai Elementary School (紅梅小学校)
- Maeno Elementary School (前野小学校)
- Midori Elementary School (緑小学校)
- Misono Elementary School (三園小学校)
- Mukaihara Elementary School (向原小学校)
- Nakadai Elementary School (中台小学校)
- Nakanebashi Elementary School (中根橋小学校)
- Narimasu Elementary School (成増小学校)
- Narimasugaoka Elementary School (成増ケ丘小学校)
- Oyaguchi Elementary School (大谷口小学校)
- Sakuragawa Elementary School (桜川小学校)
- Shimo Akatsuka Elementary School (下赤塚小学校)
- Shimura Elementary School (志村小学校)
- Shimura No. 1 Elementary School (志村第一小学校)
- Shimura No. 2 Elementary School (志村第二小学校)
- Shimura No. 3 Elementary School (志村第三小学校)
- Shimura No. 4 Elementary School (志村第四小学校)
- Shimura No. 5 Elementary School (志村第五小学校)
- Shimura No. 6 Elementary School (志村第六小学校)
- Shimura Sakashita Elementary School (志村坂下小学校)
- Shingashi Elementary School (新河岸小学校)
- Takashima No. 1 Elementary School (高島第一小学校)
- Takashima No. 2 Elementary School (高島第二小学校)
- Takashima No. 3 Elementary School (高島第三小学校)
- Takashima No. 5 Elementary School (高島第五小学校)
- Takashima No. 6 Elementary School (高島第六小学校)
- Tokiwadai Elementary School (常盤台小学校)
- Tokumaru Elementary School (徳丸小学校)
- Wakagi Elementary School (若木小学校)
- Yayoi Elementary School (弥生小学校)

=== Private schools ===
- Tokyo Third Korean Elementary School (東京朝鮮第三初級学校) – North Korean school

== Points of interest ==
- Akatsuka Botanical Garden
- Itabashi Botanical Garden
- Jorenji temple and the Daibutsu of Tokyo
- Jōhoku-Chūō Park

== Transportation ==
=== Rail ===
- East Japan Railway Company (JR East) Saikyō Line: Itabashi Station, Ukima-Funado Station
- Toei Mita Line: Shin-Itabashi, Itabashi Kuyakusho-mae, Itabashi-Honchō, Moto-Hasunuma, Shimura Sakaue, Shimura-Sanchōme, Hasune, Nishidai, Takashimadaira, Shin-Takashimadaira, Nishi-Takashimadaira Stations
- Tokyo Metro Yūrakuchō Line: Chikatetsu Narimasu Station
- Tōbu Tōjō Line: Ōyama, Naka-Itabashi, Tokiwadai, Kami-Itabashi, Tobu-Nerima, Shimo-Akatsuka, Narimasu Stations

Some of these stations straddle the boundaries with other wards, or are within walking distance of Itabashi. The addresses of some stations are in neighboring wards. Shimo-Itabashi Station is in Toshima; Kotake Mukaihara Station and Akatsuka Subway Station are in Nerima; Ukima-Funado Station is actually in Kita.

=== Highways ===
- Shuto Expressway
  - No.5 Ikebukuro Route (Takebashi JCT – Bijogi JCT)
  - C2 Central Loop (Itabashi JCT – Kasai JCT)

== Sister cities ==
- Shijingshan District, Beijing, China
- Bologna, Italy
- Burlington, Ontario, Canada

== Notable people from Itabashi ==
- Tsubasa Akimoto, actress
- Noriyuki Asakura, composer and vocalist
- Yasuhiko Fukuda, Japanese composer and keyboardist
- Tomoko Ikuta, actress
- Shō Ishikawa, Japanese baseball player
- Seizō Katō, actor, voice actor and narrator
- Masakatsu Koike, Japanese politician
- Jin Matsubara, Japanese politician
- Junko Mihara, Japanese politician, singer, actress, and racing driver
- Minami Minegishi, entertainer
- Kayo Noro, Japanese idol, singer and entertainer
- Takurō Ōno, Japanese actor and talent
- Koichi Oshima, baseball player
- Maaya Sakamoto, singer and voice actress
- Yosuke Santa Maria, Japanese professional wrestler
- Jin Shirosaki, entertainer and radio personality
- Kento Yamazaki, Japanese actor and model

== See also ==
Other locations with the same kanji (板橋, read Itabashi during Japanese rule):

- Banqiao District, New Taipei, Taiwan
- Pangyo, South Korea
- Banqiao (disambiguation)
