= Masujirō =

- Gender: Male

Origin
- Origin: Japanese
- Meaning: Different meanings depending on the kanji used

Masujirō, Masujiro, Masujirou or Masujiroh (written: 益次郎, 増次郎 or 満寿次郎) is a masculine Japanese given name. Notable people with the name include:

- Masujiro Nishida (西田 満寿次郎), Japanese footballer and manager
- Ōgane Masujirō (大金 益次郎; 1894–1979), Japanese politician
- Ōmura Masujirō (大村 益次郎; 1824–1869), Japanese military leader
- Yoshida Masujirō (吉田 増次郎; 1867–1942), Imperial Japanese Navy admiral
