= 2007 Afro-Asian Cup of Nations =

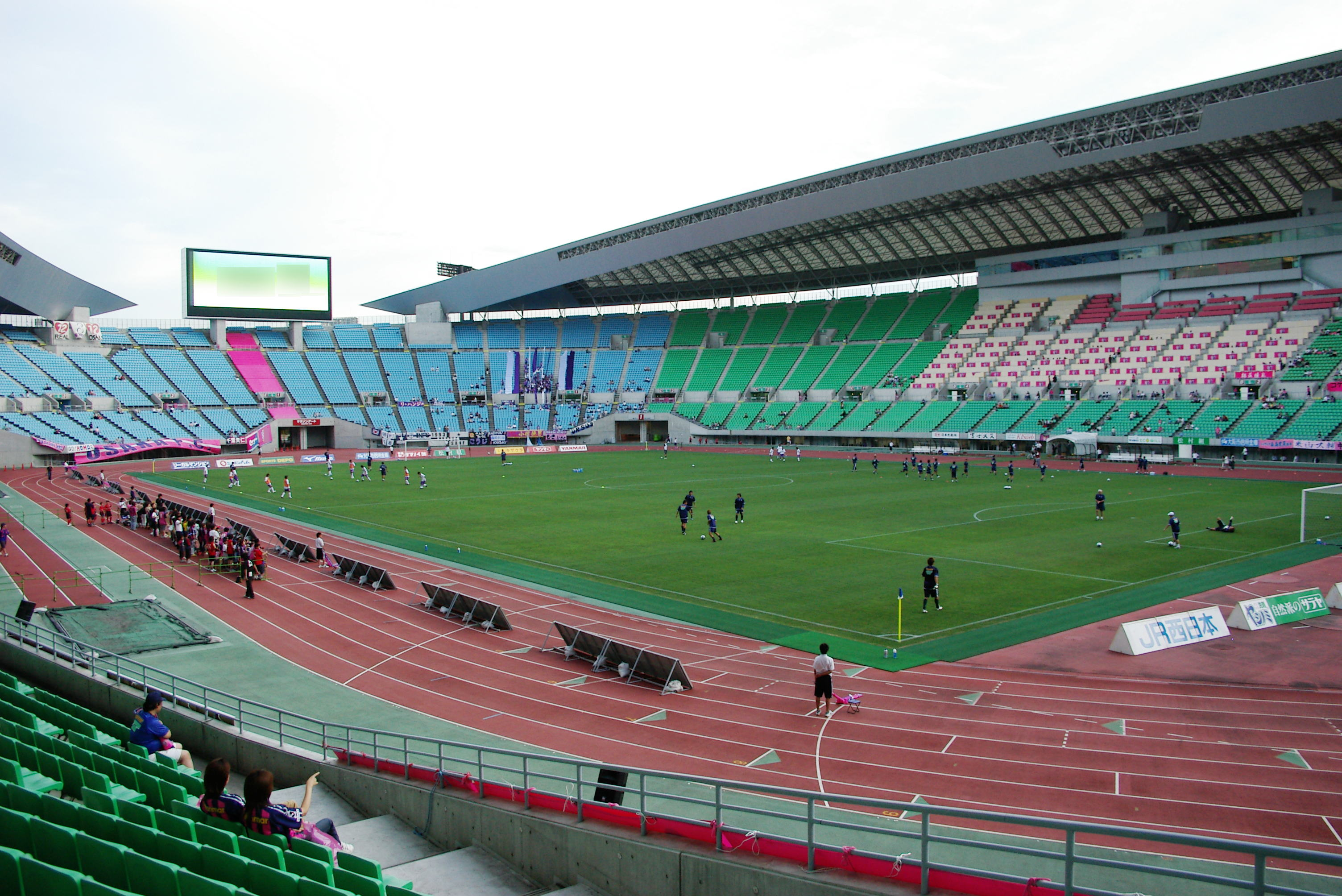
- Nagai stadium hosted the match
Japan	Egypt
4	1
- Date: 17 October 2007
- Venue: Nagai Stadium, Osaka
- Man of the Match: Yoshito Ōkubo (Japan)
- Referee: Grzegorz Gilewski (Poland)
- Attendance: 41,901

The 2007 Afro-Asian Cup of Nations, officially called AFC Asia/Africa Challenge Cup was the eighth and final edition of the Afro-Asian Cup of Nations and was played between the winners of the 2004 AFC Asian Cup Japan and the winners of the 2006 Africa Cup of Nations Egypt. The competition returned after 10 years, the previous edition was held in 1997. It was held into one leg in Japan.

== Qualified teams ==
Country	Qualified as	Previous appearance in tournament
Egypt	2006 Africa Cup of Nations champions	1 (1987)
Japan	2004 AFC Asian Cup champions	1 (1993)

== Match details ==
17 October 2007
19:30 UTC+9

Japan	4–1	Egypt
Ōkubo 21', 42'; Maeda 53'; Kaji 68'		Fadl 58'

Nagai Stadium, Osaka
Attendance: 41,901
Referee: Grzegorz Gilewski (Poland)

Japan	Egypt

Japan:
GK	–	Yoshikatsu Kawaguchi
DF	–	Yūichi Komano
DF	–	Akira Kaji
DF	–	Yuji Nakazawa	(yellow card) 58'
MF	–	Yuki Abe
MF	–	Keita Suzuki		(substituted off) 73'
MF	–	Kengo Nakamura
MF	–	Yasuhito Endō		(substituted off) 73'
MF	–	Satoru Yamagishi		(substituted off) 73'
FW	–	Ryoichi Maeda
FW	–	Yoshito Ōkubo
Substitutes:
MF	–	Jungo Fujimoto		(substituted in) 73'
MF	–	Yasuyuki Konno		(substituted in) 73'
FW	–	Hideo Hashimoto		(substituted in) 73'
Manager:
(Bosnia and Herzegovina) Ivica Osim

Egypt:
GK	–	Mohamed Abdel Monsef
DF	–	Hany Said
DF	–	Mahmoud Fathalla
DF	–	Ahmed Elmohamady
DF	–	Sayed Moawad
MF	–	Mohamed Homos
MF	–	Abdul Rahman Mohie		(substituted off) 52'
MF	–	Hosny Abd Rabo
FW	–	Amr Zaki		(substituted off) 79'
FW	–	Mohamed Fadl
FW	–	Ahmed Hassan Farag		(substituted off) 46'
Substitutes:
MF	–	Omar Gamal		(substituted in) 46'
MF	–	Gomaa Mashhour		(substituted in) 52'
FW	–	Akram Abdel-Majeed	(yellow card) 90+2'	(substituted in) 79'
Manager:
Hassan Shehata

Assistant referees:
... ... (...)
... ... (...)
Fourth official:
... ... (...)

Man of the Match:
... ... (...)

== Winners ==
2007 Afro-Asian Cup of Nations

Japan
2nd title
