= Japan national football team =

Men's association football team

Japan
- Nickname(s): サムライ・ブルー (Samurai Blue)
- Association: Japan Football Association (JFA)
- Confederation: AFC (Asia)
- Sub-confederation: EAFF (East Asia)
- Head coach: Hajime Moriyasu
- Captain: Ko Itakura
- Most caps: Yasuhito Endō (152)
- Top scorer: Kunishige Kamamoto (75)
- Home stadium: Various
- FIFA code: JPN
First colours	Second colours

FIFA ranking
- Current: 17 (18 November 2026)
- Highest: 9 (February–March 1998)
- Lowest: 66 (December 1992)

First international
- Japan 0–5 China (Tokyo, Japan; 9 May 1917)

Biggest win
- Japan 15–0 Philippines (Tokyo; 27 September 1967)

Biggest defeat
- Japan 2–15 Philippines (Tokyo; 10 May 1917)

World Cup
- Appearances: 8 (first in 1998)
- Best result: Round of 16 (2002, 2010, 2018, 2022)

Asian Cup
- Appearances: 11 (first in 1988)
- Best result: Champions (1992, 2000, 2004, 2011)

Copa América (as guest)
- Appearances: 2 (first in 1999)
- Best result: Group stage (1999, 2019)

Afro-Asian Cup of Nations
- Appearances: 2 (first in 1993)
- Best result: Champions (1993, 2007)

Confederations Cup
- Appearances: 5 (first in 1995)
- Best result: Runners-up (2001)
Medal record
Men's football
Olympic Games
Bronze medal – third place	1968 Mexico	Team
FIFA Confederations Cup
Silver medal – second place	2001 Korea and Japan	Team
AFC Asian Cup
Gold medal – first place	1992 Japan	Team
Gold medal – first place	2000 Lebanon	Team
Gold medal – first place	2004 China	Team
Gold medal – first place	2011 Qatar	Team
Silver medal – second place	2019 UAE	Team
Afro-Asian Cup of Nations
Gold medal – first place	1993 Japan	Team
Gold medal – first place	2007 Japan	Team
AFC–OFC Challenge Cup
Gold medal – first place	2001 Japan	Team
Asian Games
Bronze medal – third place	1951 New Delhi	Team
Bronze medal – third place	1966 Bangkok	Team
EAFF E-1 Football Championship
Gold medal – first place	2013 South Korea	Team
Gold medal – first place	2022 Japan	Team
Gold medal – first place	2025 South Korea	Team
Silver medal – second place	2003 Japan	Team
Silver medal – second place	2005 South Korea	Team
Silver medal – second place	2008 China	Team
Silver medal – second place	2017 Japan	Team
Silver medal – second place	2019 South Korea	Team
Bronze medal – third place	2010 Japan	Team
- Website: jfa.jp/samuraiblue

The Japan national football team (Japanese: サッカー日本代表, Hepburn: Sakkā Nippon Daihyō (Note: Sakkā Nihon Daihyō is also used.)), also known by the nickname Samurai Blue (サムライ・ブルー, Samurai Burū), represents Japan in men's international football. It is controlled by the Japan Football Association (JFA), the governing body for football in Japan.

Prior to the late 1980s, Japan's national football team was largely amateur, with the sport less popular domestically than baseball or sumo. Since the early 1990s, following the full professionalization of the sport, Japan has emerged as one of Asia's leading teams. The national team has qualified for every FIFA World Cup since 1998, advancing to the knockout stage in 2002, 2010, 2018, 2022 and 2026 being the most knockout appearances of any team in Asia. Since their first World Cup appearance in 1998, Japan has not received a single red card, which is a world record. Japan has also won a record four Asian Cup titles, in 1992, 2000, 2004, and 2011. In addition, the team finished as runners-up in both the 2001 FIFA Confederations Cup and the 2019 Asian Cup. Japan is one of only three teams from the Asian Football Confederation (AFC) to have reached the final of a senior FIFA men's competition, alongside Australia and Saudi Arabia.

Japan's progression in a short period has served as an inspiration and example of how to develop football. Their main rivals are South Korea and Australia; they also developed rivalries against Iran and Saudi Arabia. Japan was the first team from outside the Americas to participate in the Copa América, having been invited in the 1999, 2011, 2015, and 2019 editions of the tournament, although they only played in the 1999 and 2019 events. As of August 2026, Japan is currently at the 17th place in the FIFA world ranking, being the highest ranked Asian side since December 2022.

== History ==
=== 1910s–1930s: Pre-war era ===
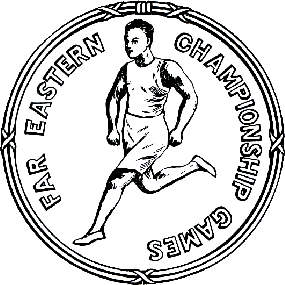
Far Eastern Championship Games logo in 1917

Japan's earliest international matches were at the 1917 Far Eastern Championship Games in Tokyo, where it was represented by a team from the Tokyo Higher Normal School. Although Japan made strong showings in swimming, baseball, and track and field, its football team suffered resounding defeats to the Republic of China and the Philippines. Nevertheless, the game was promoted in Japanese schools in the 1920s. The Japan Football Association was formed in 1921, and Japan joined FIFA in May 1929. However, Japan refused to participate in the 1930 FIFA World Cup.

Japan's first "true" national team (as opposed to a university team chosen to represent the country) was fielded at the 1930 Far Eastern Championship Games, and drew with China for the championship title. Shigeyoshi Suzuki coached the national team to its first Olympic appearance at the 1936 Summer Olympics in Berlin. Japan was an entrant for 1938 FIFA World Cup qualifying, but withdrew before its scheduled qualifying match against the Dutch East Indies.

After World War II began, Japan did not play in international competition, except for a handful of matches against Manchuria and other colonies. Its last prewar match for purposes of Elo ratings was a friendly against the Philippines in June 1940. While Korea was under Japanese rule, multiple Koreans played in international competition for Japan, including Kim Yong-sik (1936–40), Kim Sung-gan (1940) and Lee Yoo-hyung (1940).

=== 1950s–1980s: Post-war era ===
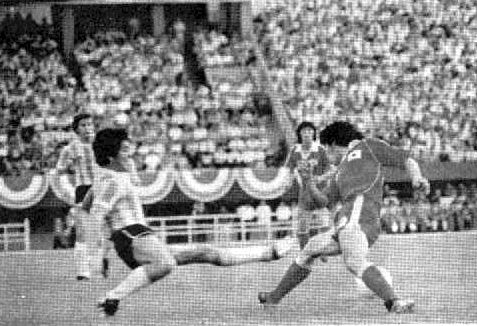
Japan playing Argentine club Racing de Córdoba at the 1981 President's Cup

Japan's postwar debut was in the 1951 Asian Games in India. Japan re-joined FIFA in 1950 and played in qualifiers for the 1954 World Cup, but lost the AFC qualifying berth to South Korea after two matches. Japan also joined the Asian Football Confederation in 1954.

Dettmar Cramer joined the Japan national team as coach in 1960, and helped lead the team to the round of eight at the 1964 Summer Olympics in Tokyo. Japan's first major achievement in international football came in the 1968 Summer Olympics in Mexico City, where the team won the bronze medal. Although this result earned the sport increased recognition in Japan, the absence of a professional domestic league hindered its growth and Japan would not qualify for the World Cup until 30 years later. Nonetheless, Japan were close to qualifying for the 1986 FIFA World Cup, but lost to South Korea in the deciding matches.

Japan made its first appearance in the AFC Asian Cup in 1988, where they were eliminated in the group stage following a draw with Iran and losses to South Korea, the United Arab Emirates and Qatar.

The late 1980s saw concrete moves to professionalize the sport in Japan. JFA introduced a Special Licensed Player system in 1986, allowing a limited number of professional players to compete in the domestic semi-professional league. Action committees were held in 1988 and 1989 to discuss the introduction of a full professional league in Japan.

=== 1990s: Rise ===
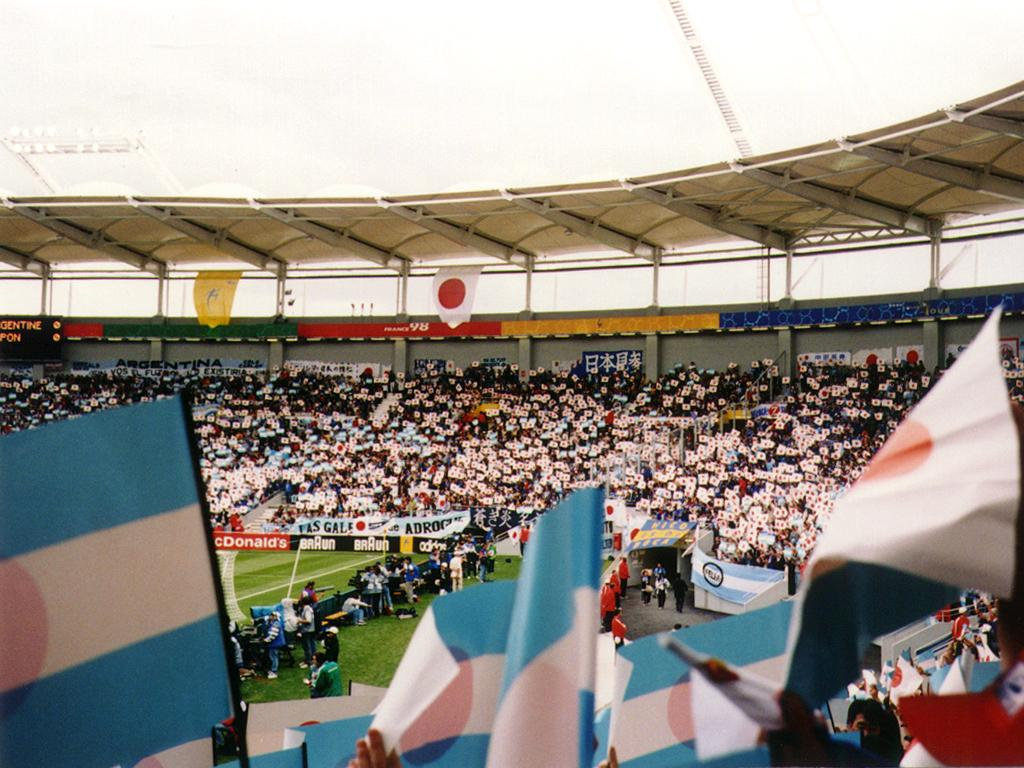
The 1998 World Cup match vs. Argentina in Toulouse, France

In the 1990s, the Japan Football Association began the professionalization of its national football team. In 1991, the owners of the semi-professional Japan Soccer League agreed to disband the league and re-form as the professional J.League, partly to raise the sport's profile and to strengthen the national team program. The following year, Japan hosted the 1992 AFC Asian Cup and won their first title by defeating Saudi Arabia 1–0 in the final. The J.League was officially launched in 1993.

However, in its first attempt to qualify with professional players, Japan narrowly missed a ticket to the 1994 FIFA World Cup after drawing with Iraq in the final match of the qualification round, remembered by fans as the "Agony of Doha". Japan's next tournament was a defence of their continental title at the 1996 AFC Asian Cup. The team won all their games in the group stage but were eliminated in the quarter-finals after a 2–0 loss to Kuwait.

The nation's first ever FIFA World Cup appearance was in 1998, where Japan lost all their games. The first two fixtures went 1–0 in favour of Argentina and Croatia, and the campaign ended with a 2–1 defeat to Jamaica. Japan impressed, however, as all three defeats were only by a one goal margin.

=== 2000s: Two Asian Cup titles, World Cup co-hosts ===
In the 2000 AFC Asian Cup, Japan managed to reclaim their title after defeating Saudi Arabia in the final, becoming Asian champions for the second time.

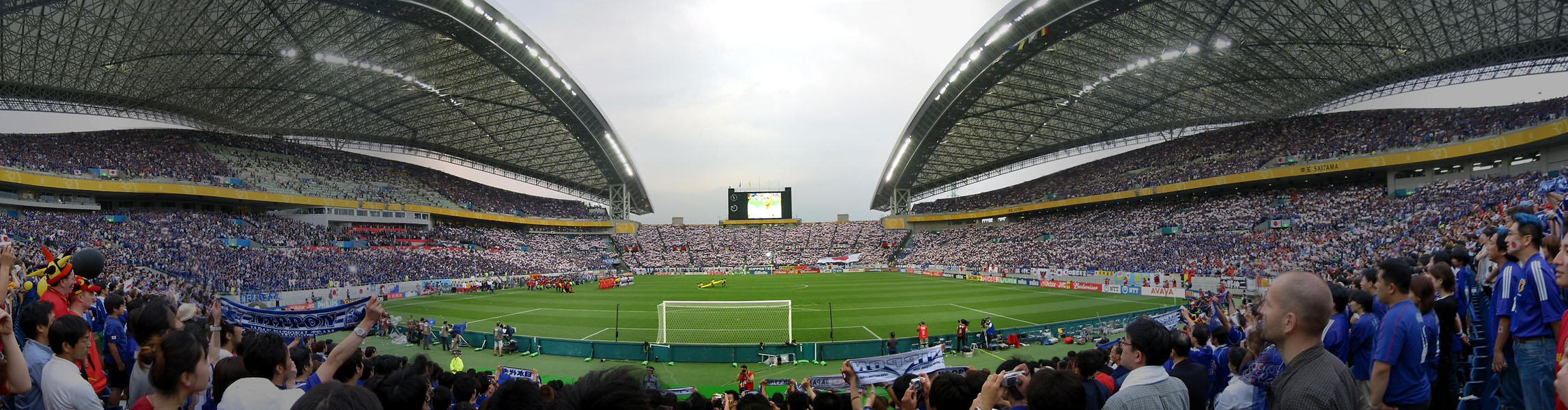
The 2002 World Cup match vs. Belgium at Saitama Stadium 2002 on 4 June

Two years later, Japan co-hosted the 2002 FIFA World Cup with South Korea. After a 2–2 draw with Belgium in their opening match, the Japanese team advanced to the second round with a 1–0 win over Russia and a 2–0 victory against Tunisia. However, they subsequently exited the tournament during the round of 16, after losing 1–0 to eventual third-place finishers Turkey in extra time.

With the 2004 AFC Asian Cup hosted by China, the Japanese managed to retain the title by winning their group after two victories over Thailand and Oman, before achieving victories against Jordan and Bahrain. They defeated the hosts in the final 3–1.

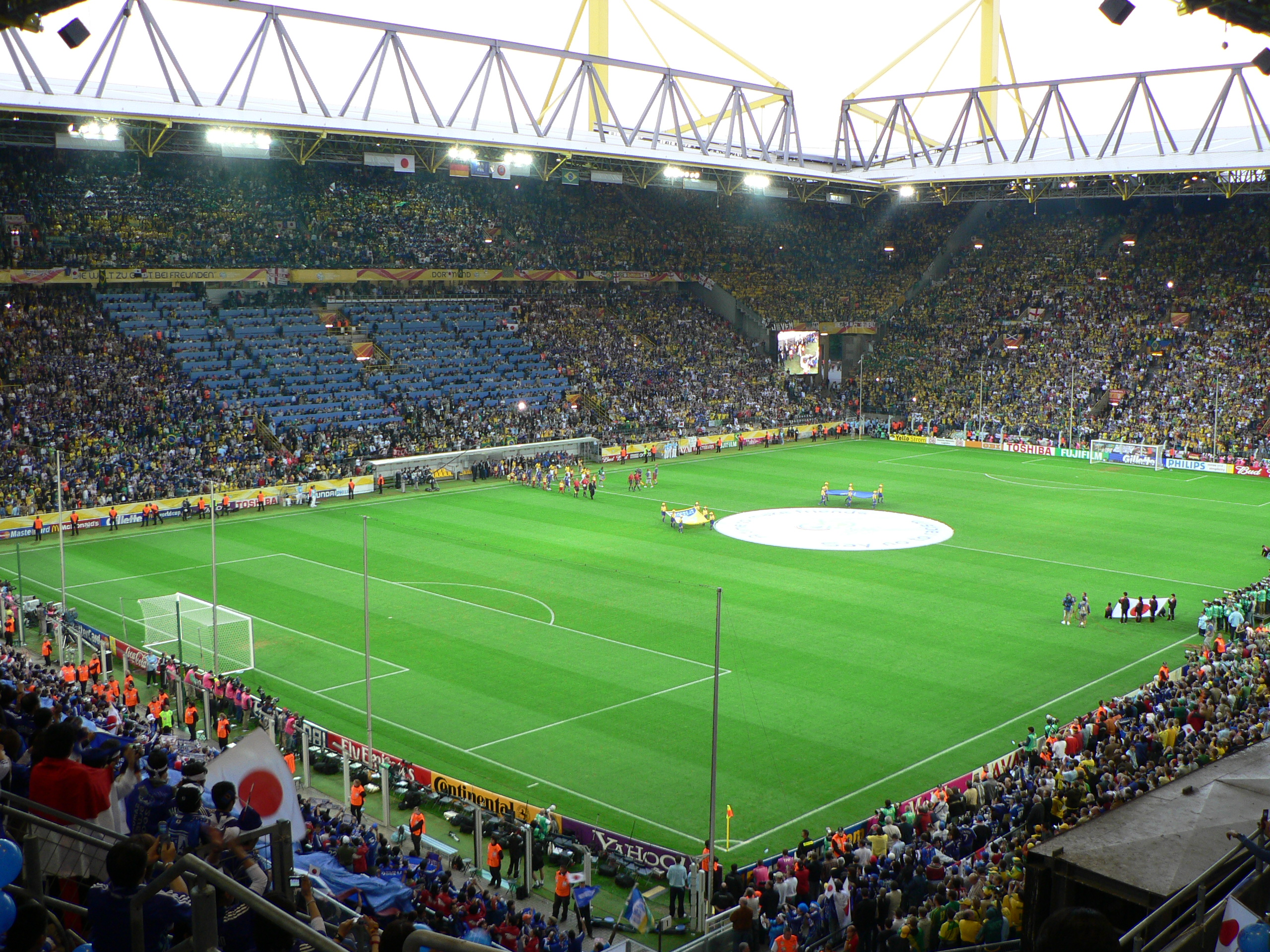
Japan against Brazil at Signal Iduna Park in Dortmund, Germany in the 2006 FIFA World Cup

On 8 June 2005, Japan qualified for the 2006 FIFA World Cup in Germany, its third consecutive World Cup, by beating North Korea 2–0 on neutral ground. However, Japan failed to advance to the round of 16, losing to future AFC rival Australia 3–1, drawing Croatia 0–0 and falling to Brazil 4–1.

The 2007 AFC Asian Cup saw Japan fail to defend its title. Although easily winning the group over Vietnam, Qatar and the UAE, the Japanese were totally exhausted in their game against Australia, where Japan won only by a penalty shootout. Japan lost to Saudi Arabia in the semi-finals, before failing in the third-place match against South Korea.

=== 2010s ===
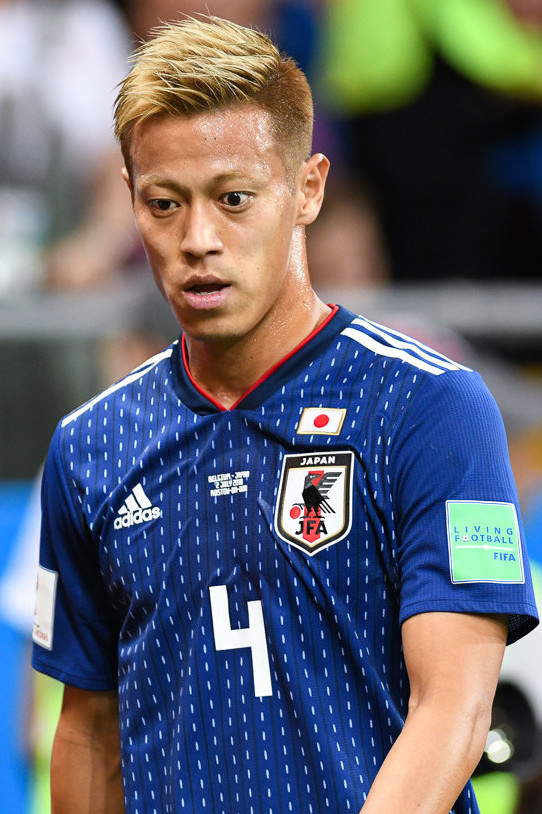
Keisuke Honda was one of Japan's most successful national team players of the 2010s, playing in three World Cups and winning the MVP at the 2011 AFC Asian Cup.

During the 2010 FIFA World Cup qualification, in the fourth round of the Asian qualifiers, Japan became the first team other than the host South Africa to qualify after defeating Uzbekistan 1–0 away. Japan was drawn in Group E along with the Netherlands, Denmark and Cameroon. Japan started with a 1–0 win against Cameroon, before subsequently losing to the Netherlands 1–0. Then, Japan resoundingly beat Denmark 3–1 to advance to the next round against Paraguay. In the round of 16, Japan were eliminated from the competition following penalties after a 0–0 draw against Paraguay.

After the 2010 FIFA World Cup, head coach Takeshi Okada resigned. He was replaced by former Juventus and Milan coach Alberto Zaccheroni. In his first few matches, Japan recorded victories over Guatemala (2–1) and Paraguay (1–0), as well as a 1–0 victory over Argentina.

Japan participated in the 2011 AFC Asian Cup in Qatar. On 29 January, they beat Australia 1–0 in the final after extra time, their fourth Asian Cup triumph and allowing them to qualify for the 2013 FIFA Confederations Cup. The country then started their road to the 2014 FIFA World Cup in Brazil. Throughout, they suffered only two losses to Uzbekistan and Jordan, and drew against Australia. After a 1–1 draw with Australia, they qualified for the 2014 World Cup, becoming the first nation aside from the hosts to qualify.

Japan started their 2013 FIFA Confederations Cup campaign with a 3–0 loss to Brazil. They were then eliminated from the competition after losing to Italy 4–3. They lost their final match 1–2 against Mexico and finished in fourth place in Group A. One month later, in the EAFF East Asian Cup, they started out with a 3–3 draw to China. They then beat Australia 3–2 and beat South Korea 2–1 in the third and final match in the tournament to claim the title.

Japan was placed into Group C at the 2014 FIFA World Cup alongside the Ivory Coast, Greece and Colombia. They fell in their first match to Ivory Coast 2–1 after initially taking the lead, allowing two goals in a two-minute span. They drew their second game to Greece 0–0. To qualify for the second round, they needed a victory against Colombia and Greece to win against Ivory Coast. Greece beat Ivory Coast 2–1, but Colombia won 4–1, eliminating Japan from the World Cup. Alberto Zaccheroni resigned as head coach. In July 2014, former Mexico and Espanyol manager Javier Aguirre took over, and Japan lost 0–2 to Uruguay in the first game he managed.

Japan won its opening match at the 2015 AFC Asian Cup in Group D against Asian Cup debutantes Palestine 4–0, with goals from Yasuhito Endō, Shinji Okazaki, Keisuke Honda and Maya Yoshida. Okazaki was named man of the match. They then faced Iraq and Jordan in their next group matches, which they won 1–0 and 2–0 respectively. They qualified to the knockout stage as Group D winners with nine points, seven goals scored and no goals conceded. In the quarter-finals, Japan lost to the UAE in a penalty shootout after a 1–1 draw, as Honda and Shinji Kagawa missed their penalty kicks. Japan's elimination marked their worst performance in the tournament in 19 years.

After the Asian Cup, Aguirre was sacked following allegations of corruption during a prior tenure. He was replaced by Vahid Halilhodžić in March 2015. Japan started on a rough note during qualification, losing to the UAE 1–2 at home. They then picked up the pace in their other qualifier games against Iraq, Australia, and Thailand, picking up five wins and two draws. On 31 August 2017, Japan defeated Australia 2–0 at home, thus qualifying them for the 2018 World Cup in Russia, making it their sixth successive World Cup. However, the Japan Football Association decided to sack Halilhodžić on 9 April 2018, only ten weeks before the World Cup, citing reasons of a breakdown in relationship between the coach and players, and poor recent friendly results, and appoint the Technical Director, Japanese coach Akira Nishino as the new manager.

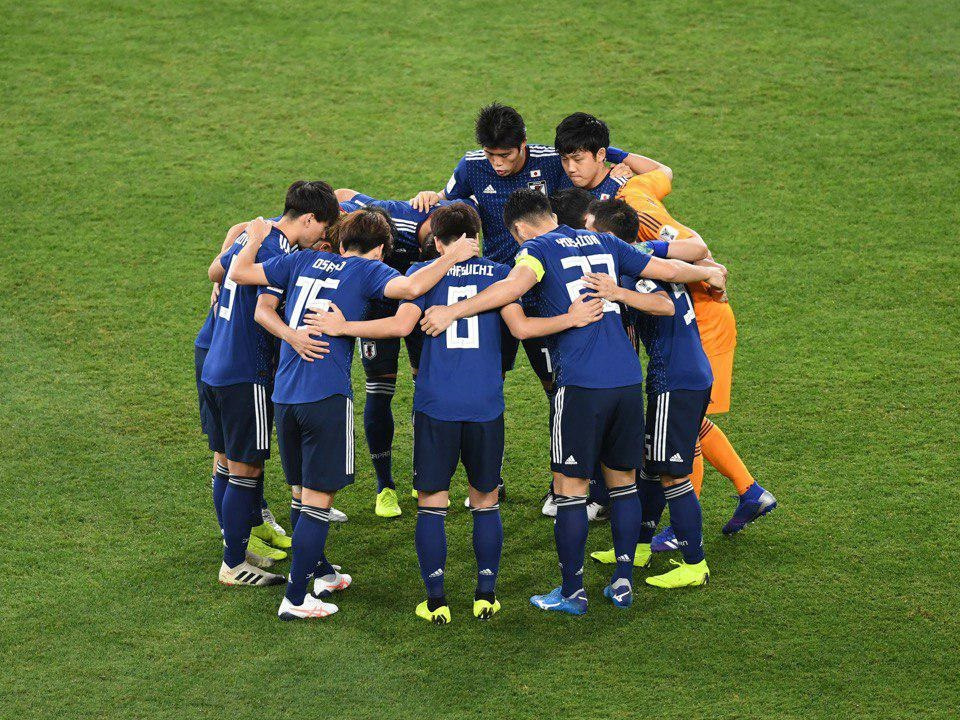
Japan before their match against Iran at the 2019 Asian Cup

Japan made history in the 2018 FIFA World Cup by defeating Colombia 2–1, their first ever victory by any AFC team against a CONMEBOL team in an official tournament, as well as Japan's first ever victory at the FIFA World Cup finals in UEFA nations. Their second match against Senegal ended in a draw with goals from Takashi Inui and Keisuke Honda. Japan were defeated in their last group game in the Group H against Poland 1–0, leaving Japan and Senegal tied for second with an identical record; however, as Japan had received two fewer yellow cards, Japan advanced to the knockout stage on the Fair Play Points tiebreaker, the first team to do so. The match with Poland caused controversy, as Japan were made aware of their advantage over Senegal with ten minutes left and decided to play an extremely conservative game with no attempts to take a shot on goal, despite losing 1–0, with some fans booing the players. The match received comparison to the 1982 FIFA World Cup Disgrace of Gijón, in which a similar game was played. Japan were the only AFC team to have qualified to the knockout stage.

In the round of 16 against Belgium, Japan took a surprising 2–0 lead with a goal in the 48th minute by Genki Haraguchi and another in the 52nd by Takashi Inui, but yielded three goals afterwards, including the winner by Nacer Chadli on the counterattack in the 94th minute. This was Japan's third time having reached the last 16. Japan's defeat to eventual third-place finishers Belgium was the first time a nation had lost a knockout match at the World Cup after taking a two-goal advantage since England lost to West Germany 3–2 in extra-time in the quarter-final of the 1970 edition. This scenario was due to the naivety of the Japanese, who were very offensive and did not fall back enough in defense once the two-goal lead was acquired, leaving a lot of space to the Belgians, who also took advantage of their well-calculated tactics and superior strategies to turn the game around. However, Japan's impressive performance was praised by fans, pundits and the media.

Japan participated in the 2019 AFC Asian Cup and had an almost successful tournament. The team easily topped group F after defeating Turkmenistan 3–2, Oman 1–0 and Uzbekistan 2–1. Japan, which opted for a cautious defensive approach (as the offensive approach lead to a regretful scenario against Belgium during the World Cup 2018), also beat fellow powerhouse Saudi Arabia in the round of sixteen and dark horse Vietnam in the quarter-finals by the narrowest of margins like during the group stage, both 2 knockout phases' games ended with 1–0 margin; Blue Samurai resist intense Saudi domination. After defeating Iran 3–0 to reach the final, Japan's hope to win their fifth Asian Cup in two decades shattered with the team suffering a 1–3 loss to Qatar, who won the Asian Cup for the first time.

Japan were invited to the 2019 Copa América, their second appearance at the tournament, and brought a young squad to the competition. They were placed in Group C with Uruguay, Chile and Ecuador. The nation lost their opening match 4–0 to Chile, before bouncing back and drawing against Uruguay 2–2. Japan needed a win against Ecuador to qualify for the knockouts, however they drew 1–1 and missed out due to inferior goal difference to Paraguay. Aftermath saw Japan played a friendly game against the Paraguayans, and won 2–0 at home.

=== 2020s ===
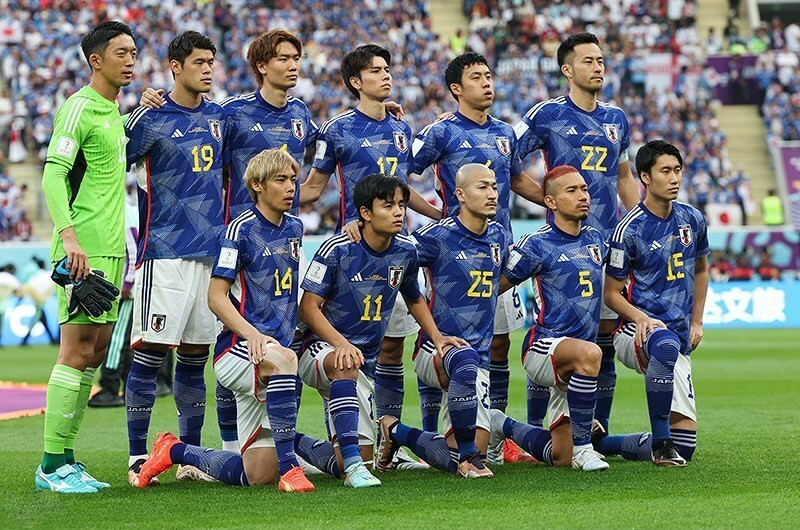
Japan starting line up where they went on to win against Germany 2–1

After China was removed as host of the 2022 EAFF E-1 Football Championship, it was announced that Japan was the new host. After topping the table with two wins and one draw, Japan won the competition for the second time in their history.

Japan qualified for the 2022 FIFA World Cup in Qatar, and were drawn into Group E with Germany, Costa Rica and Spain. On 23 November, Japan produced an upset, beating Germany 2–1, with two goals in an eight-minute span during the second half. After losing to Costa Rica 1–0, going into the final matchday, every team in Group E could qualify or be eliminated, with no team assured of any placement. In the end, Japan managed to qualify for the round of 16 by defeating Spain 2–1 in their final group stage match, while also contributing to Germany's elimination from the tournament. By topping their group, Japan went on to face Croatia in the round of 16 where they would lose 3–1 on penalties after a 1–1 draw. It was the third team in 52 years to have come from behind twice in one tournament, following Brazil and (West) Germany. They beat Spain with the lowest possession (18%) of the ball for a winning side since the 1966 FIFA World Cup. It also was the first time that an Asian team topped their FIFA World Cup group held outside their home country, and also the first Asian team to reach the knockouts twice in a row.

With a successful 2022 World Cup behind them and a run of 10 consecutive victories in all competitions since June 2023, many of them in style, Japan were considered the favourites for the 2023 Asian Nations Cup in Qatar, especially as the Samurai Blue had a strong squad. Japan, however, were the biggest disappointment of the tournament, putting in a catastrophic performance. Hajime Moriyasu's men began the tournament with an unconvincing victory over a Vietnamese side deprived of a number of key players (4–2, having broken the deadlock in the 85th minute and trailed 1–2 shortly after the half-hour mark), before going on to play a nightmarish game against Iraq (1–2). This defeat, Japan's first in the group phase since their first appearance at the continental showpiece in 1988, condemned them to finish at best 2nd in the group due to their unfavourable head-to-head record. The Land of the Rising Sun made sure of the points by overcoming Indonesia (3–1) and then eliminated Bahrain by the same scoreline in the Round of 16. Japan met Iran in the quarter-finals for a rematch of the previous edition's semi-final, and got the game off to a perfect start with Hidemasa Morita's 28th-minute opener, before falling completely flat in the second half, succumbing to Iran's fiery attacks and lacking the ideas to trouble Team Melli on the counter-attack, who exacted revenge and turned the match on its head thanks to some blatant defensive errors by Kō Itakura (1–2). This elimination was a real fiasco for a Japanese team that had suffered 2 defeats in the same competition, including one in the 1st round, something that hadn't happened since the 1988 edition (a draw and 3 defeats), but it was the first time since Japanese football turned professional. In particular, Japan showed worrying signs at the back, conceding at least one goal in every match, many of them from avoidable errors by inexperienced goalkeeper Zion Suzuki (due to the withdrawal of the usual starting goalkeepers) or by their defensive hinge, which, unlike the previous edition, was often overwhelmed; all this while often playing on alternating current and reacting too late or intermittently showing an apathetic face (a non-match in the first half against Iraq, the botched 2nd half against Iran). The squad also had to contend with an extra-sporting controversy, with the sudden departure of Junya Itō shortly before the crucial match against the Persians, the player from Reims having been accused of sexual assault.

On 20 March 2025, a 2–0 win against Bahrain saw Japan become the first non-host nation to qualify for the 2026 FIFA World Cup. Japan was drawn into Group F with Netherlands, Tunisia, and the UEFA playoff path B winner, Sweden.

On 31 March 2026, Japan secured a 1–0 win against England at Wembley Stadium, with England beaten by an Asian side for the first time in history.

Japan qualified for the 2026 FIFA World Cup and advanced to the round of 32 with one win and two draw in the first stage. On 29 June 2026, Japan was eliminated in the first knockout round in a 2–1 loss against Brazil at Houston Stadium.

== Team image ==
=== Nicknames ===
Japan's national football team is nicknamed the Samurai Blue (サムライ・ブルー, Samurai Burū) by the JFA. The team also is often known by the last name of the manager. For example, under Takeshi Okada, the team was known as Okada Japan (岡田ジャパン, Okada Japan), (Note: A common methodology of nickname creation is done by taking the last name of incumbent head coach followed by "Japan". Past teams have been referred to as, "Osim Japan" (オシムジャパン, Oshimu Japan), "Zico Japan" (ジーコジャパン, Jīko Japan), "Troussier Japan" (トルシエジャパン, Torushie Japan)) or during the 2022 World Cup, the team is referred by the current manager's (Hajime Moriyasu) name, as "Moriyasu Japan" (森保ジャパン, Moriyasu Japan).

=== Kit ===
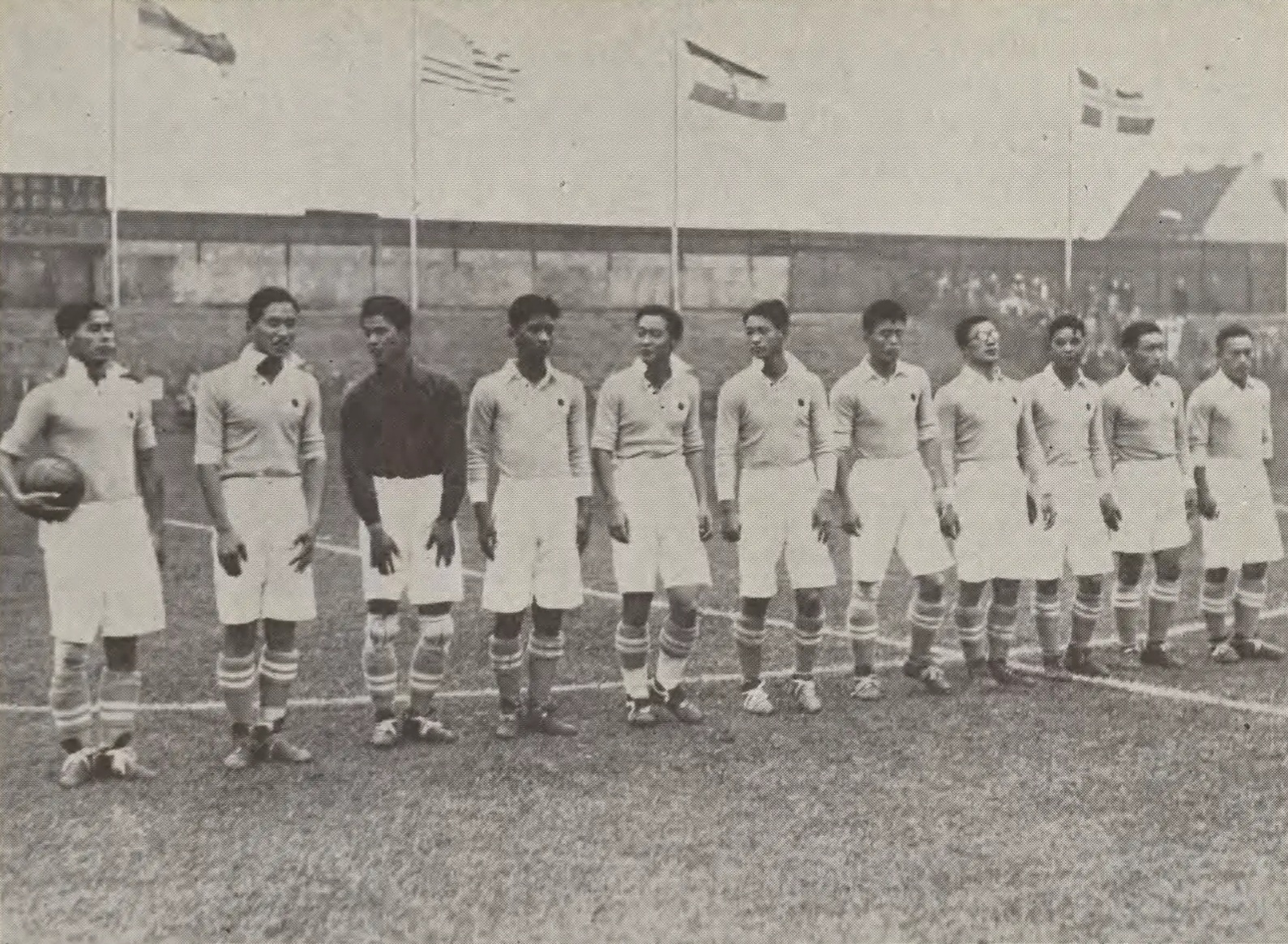
Japan at the 1936 Olympics

The national team kit design has gone through several alterations in the past. In the early 1980s, the kit was white with blue trim. The kits worn for the 1992 Asian Cup consisted of white stripes (stylized to form a wing) with red diamonds. During the 1996 Asian Cup and the 1998 World Cup, the national team kits were blue jerseys with red and white flame designs on the sleeves, and were designed by JFA (with the sponsor alternating each year between Asics, Puma, and Adidas). The 1996 design was reproduced in a special kit used against Syria on 7 June 2017.

JFA has historically been identified with the colors blue and white, as opposed to the white and red of the Flag of Japan. Prior to 1930, the best ranked university team of the year would represent Japan, and wear their school's own uniform. JFA first formed an independent national squad for the 1930 Far Eastern Championship Games, selecting the best players from across the country, and the players chose Imperial University's color of light blue for their first uniform. They did attempt to switch to a red and white colorway in 1989, failed to qualify for the 1990 World Cup and the 1992 Summer Olympics, and switched back to blue in 1992. In 2021, Japan released a special 100th anniversary kit for a friendly match against Jamaica. The kit was also used by the U-24 team against Ghana on 5 June 2021.

Japan's kit is provided by German company Adidas, the team's exclusive kit supplier since April 1999. Before that, Asics and Puma had been the team's official apparel sponsor.

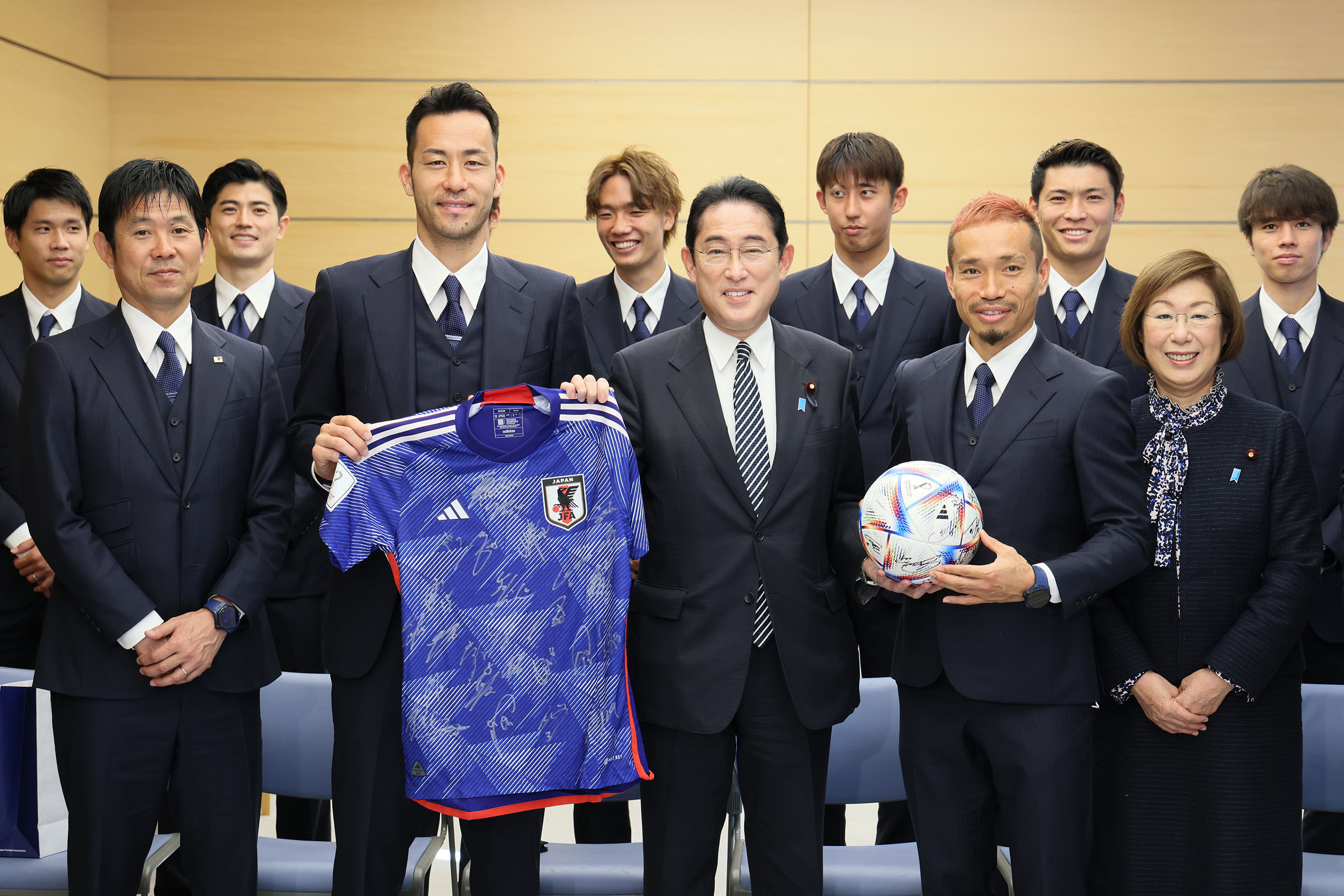
JFA 2022 team and kit as given to Prime Minister Kishida

==== Kit suppliers ====
Kit provider	Period
None	1936–196?
(Japan) Mikuni	196?–1970
(Japan) Descente	1970–1974
(West Germany) Adidas	1975–1977
(Japan) Asics	1979
(West Germany) Puma	1980–1985
(West Germany) Adidas	1986
(Japan) Asics	1987–1988
(Germany) Adidas	1989–1992
(Japan) Asics	1993–1998
(Germany) Adidas	1999–present

=== Crest ===
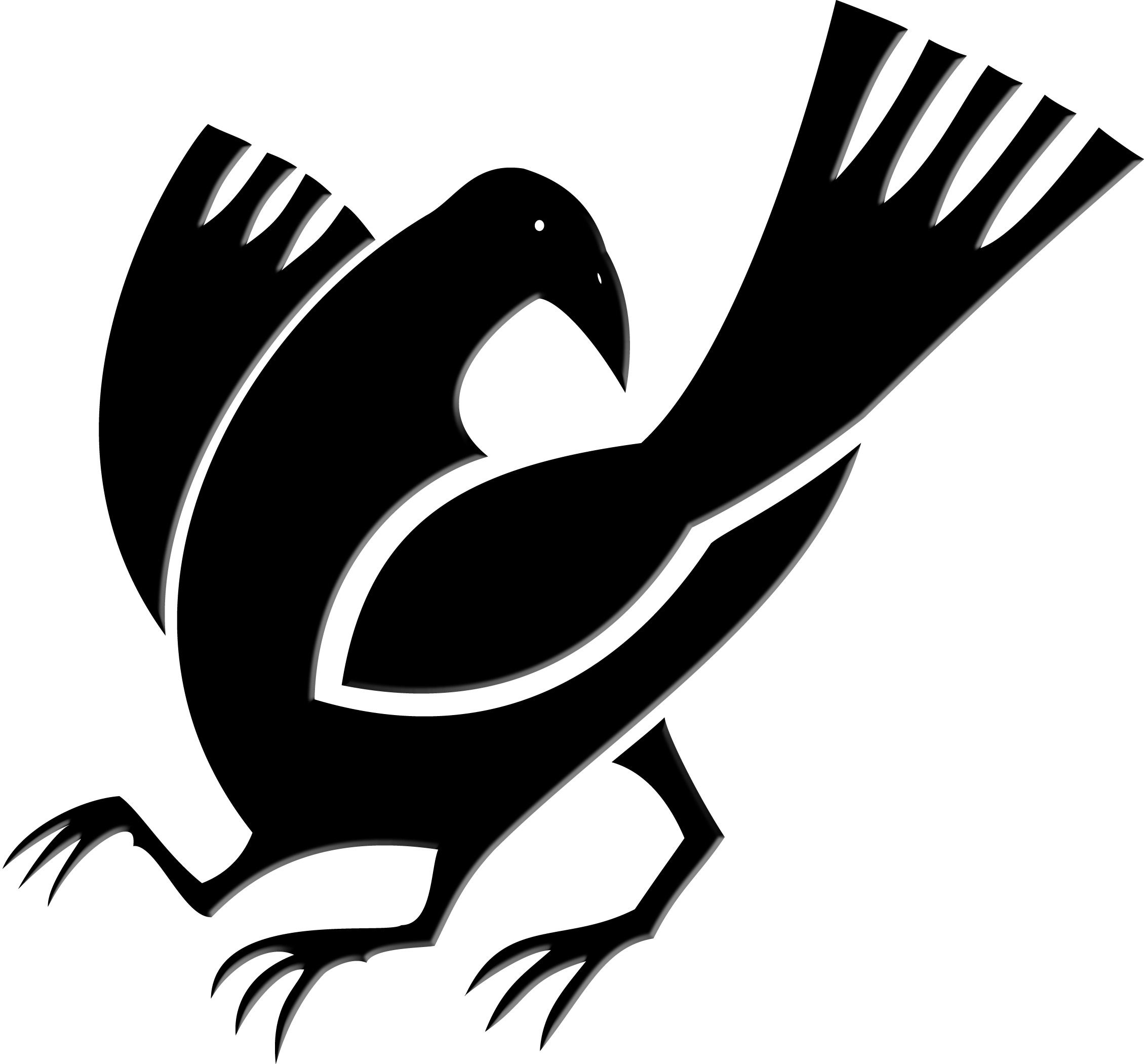
Yatagarasu

The crest or emblem of the national team was adopted in late 2017 as part of a larger rebranding by the Japan Football Association. The crest features the Yatagarasu, a three-legged crow from Japanese mythology that is a symbol for the sun, holding a solid red ball that is like the sun from national flag. The text "JFA" (for the Japan Football Association) is inscribed at the bottom of the crow. A red stripe is also present at the center of the shield behind the crow. The shield has a metallic gold trim and has a thicker black outline. The name of the country represented by the national team "Japan" is also inscribed within the black border.

The previous crest used from 1996 had a shield with a more complex shape. The ball held by the Yatagarasu had white details. The text "Japan" is absent and "JFA" is written in a different typeface.

The Yatagarasu was first seen on the Japan shirts in 1988, where it was on a yellow circle with a blue outline with "JAPAN FOOTBALL ASSOCIATION" written around it. In 1991, the emblem changed to a white shield with a red vertical stripe on the center with the crow on it and "JFA" written in a green Gothic typeface. This crest was used until 1996. Before 1988, Japan used the national flag outlined in red (and with JFA written in black on the lower left corner of the flag) on the shirts.

=== Home stadium ===
Japan plays its home matches among various stadiums, in rotation, around the country, especially the Saitama Stadium 2002.

=== Rivalries ===
==== South Korea ====
Japan maintains a strong football rivalry with South Korea. Japan have met South Korea 80 times, trailing the statistic at 17 wins, 23 draws, and 42 losses, while scoring 74 goals and conceding 124. Since November 1991, when the Japan Professional Football League was launched, the record is even with 10 wins, 12 draws and 10 losses. Both countries have made themselves unrivalled in both Asian Cup and World Cup records, being two of the most successful Asian football teams, and they hosted the 2002 World Cup in a joint bid.

==== North Korea ====
Japan maintains a rivalry with North Korea, although the rivalry is infrequent due to political circumstances. Japan have met North Korea 22 times, with a record of 10 wins, 4 draws and 8 losses.

==== China ====
Previously, when Japan had not established professional football, Japan had only 4 wins, 3 draws and 13 losses against China. However, Japan's establishment of professional football helped turn the tide, and the Japanese have been able to exert domination with 16 wins, 6 draws and just 2 losses. China has not beaten Japan since March 1998, and lost to them 3–1 in the 2004 AFC Asian Cup final.

==== Australia ====
Japan began to develop a fierce rivalry with fellow Asian powerhouse Australia, shortly after the latter joined the Asian Football Confederation. The rivalry is regarded as one of Asia's biggest football rivalries. The rivalry is a relatively recent one, born from a number of highly competitive matches between the two teams since Australia joined the AFC in 2006. The rivalry began at the 2006 World Cup where the two countries were grouped together, and continued with the two countries meeting regularly in various AFC competitions, such as the 2007 AFC Asian Cup, the 2011 AFC Asian Cup Final and the 2013 EAFF East Asian Cup.

Japan have met Australia 28 times, with a record of 11 wins, 10 draws and 7 losses.

==== Saudi Arabia ====
Japan and Saudi Arabia are two of the most historically successful national teams in Asia and have frequently met each other in many major tournaments, including in the Asian Cup and World Cup qualification. The frequency is also rivalled by high-level performances of Japan and Saudi Arabia in the Asian and global football stage, as they are two of the three AFC members (alongside Australia) to reach the final of any senior FIFA competition. Both countries also gained headlines for producing "unexpected" wins in the 2022 World Cup, with Japan earning wins against Germany and Spain and Saudi Arabia against eventual champions Argentina in the group stage. These wins over World Cup-winning oppositions have allowed comparisons of developments between Japan and Saudi Arabia to emerge.

In the head-to-head record, Japan have an advantage over the Saudis with 12 wins, 2 draws and 6 losses.

==== Iran ====
Japan and Iran have a combined seven Asian Cup titles, with a rivalry developing in the 1990s due to the famous "Joy of Johor Bahru" (ジョホール・バルの歓喜, Johōru Baru no kanki) that gave Japan a ticket to their first World Cup defeating the Persians by 3–2 in a neutral Asian play-off hosted in Johor Bahru, Malaysia.

More recently, the two countries met in the 2019 and 2023 Asian Cups. The Samurai Blue defeated Team Melli 3–0 in the semifinals of the 2019 edition. The Iranians got revenge four years later eliminating Japan 2–1 in the quarter-finals.

Japan have met Iran 19 times, with a record of 6 wins, 6 draws and 7 losses.

=== Supporters ===
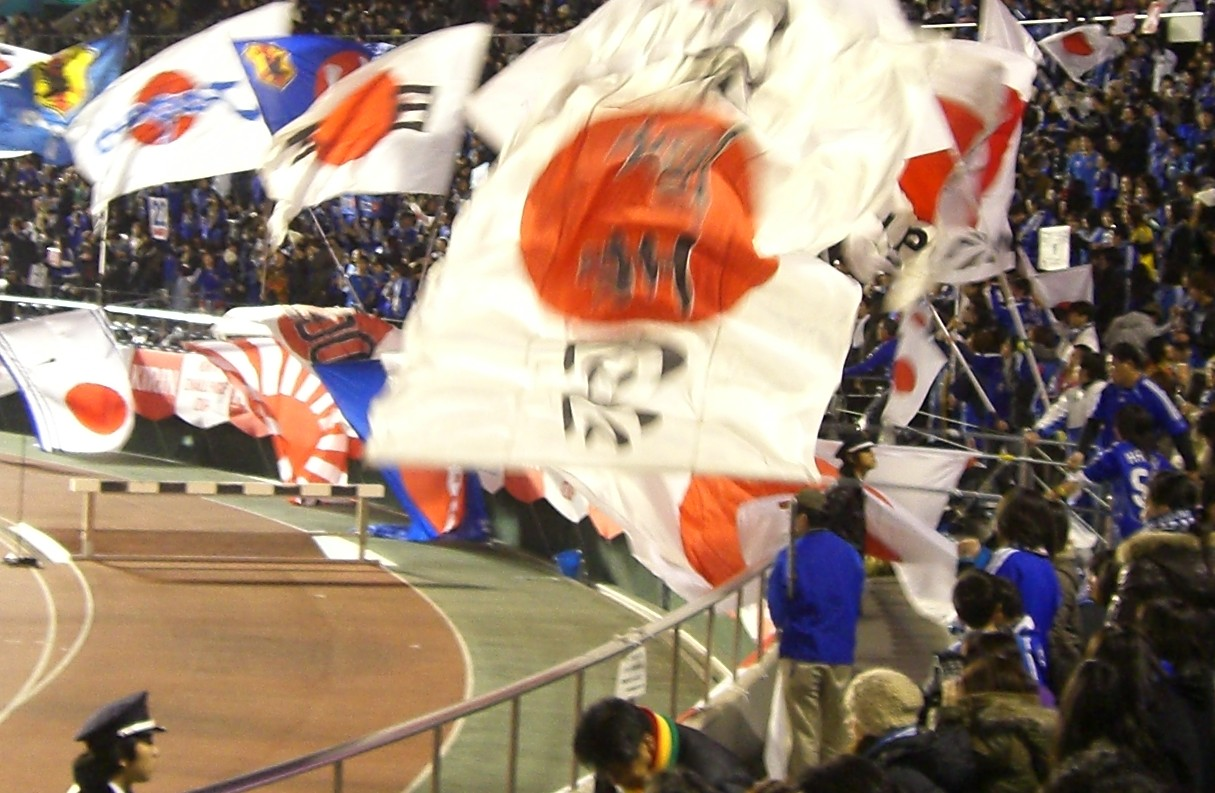
Fans waving national flags in support of the Japanese national team

Japanese national team supporters are known for chanting "Nippon Ole" and "Vamos Nippon".

=== Sponsorship ===
Japan has one of the highest sponsorship incomes for a national squad. In 2006 their sponsorship income amounted to over 16.5 million pounds.

Primary sponsors include Adidas, ANA, Kirin, Saison Card International, Toyo Tires, Mitsui Fudosan, MS&AD Insurance Group, Yomiuri Shimbun, Mizuho Financial, APA Group, Toyota and au.

=== Mascot ===
The mascots are "Karappe" (カラッペ) and "Karara" (カララ), two Yatagarasu wearing the Japan national football team kit. The mascots were designed by Japanese manga artist Susumu Matsushita. Each year when a new kit is launched, the mascots' uniforms are updated in order to match the kit being used by the team.

For the 2014 FIFA World Cup, the Pokémon character Pikachu served as the mascot.

== Results and fixtures ==
The following is a list of match results in the last 12 months, as well as any future matches that have been scheduled.

Legend

Win Draw Loss Fixture

=== 2026 ===
28 March Kirin World Challenge 2026	Scotland	0–1	Japan	Glasgow, Scotland
17:00 UTC+0		Report	J. Itō 84'	Stadium: Hampden Park; Attendance: 44,644; Referee: Shaun Evans (Australia)

31 March Kirin World Challenge 2026	England	0–1	Japan	London, England
19:45 UTC+1		Report	Mitoma 23'	Stadium: Wembley Stadium; Attendance: 79,233; Referee: Nick Walsh (Scotland)

31 May Kirin Challenge Cup 2026	Japan	1–0	Iceland	Tokyo, Japan
19:25 UTC+9	Ogawa 86'	Report		Stadium: Japan National Stadium; Attendance: 62,212; Referee: Damian Kos (Poland)

14 June 2026 FIFA World Cup Group F	Netherlands	2–2	Japan	Arlington, Texas, United States
15:00 UTC−5	van Dijk 51'; Summerville 64'	Report	Nakamura 57'; Kamada 88'	Stadium: AT&T Stadium; Attendance: 69,285; Referee: Ismail Elfath (United States)

20 June 2026 FIFA World Cup Group F	Tunisia	0–4	Japan	Guadalupe, Nuevo León, Mexico
22:00 UTC−6		Report	Kamada 4'; Ueda 31', 83'; J. Itō 69'	Stadium: Estadio BBVA; Attendance: 51,243; Referee: István Kovács (Romania)

25 June 2026 FIFA World Cup Group F	Japan	1–1	Sweden	Arlington, Texas, United States
18:00 UTC−5	Maeda 56'	Report	Elanga 62'	Stadium: AT&T Stadium; Attendance: 70,137; Referee: Iván Barton (El Salvador)

29 June 2026 FIFA World Cup Round of 32	Brazil	2–1	Japan	Houston, Texas, United States
12:00 UTC−5	Casemiro 56'; Martinelli 90+5'	Report	Sano 29'	Stadium: NRG Stadium; Attendance: 68,777; Referee: Maurizio Mariani (Italy)

24 September Kirin Challenge Cup 2026	Japan	3–1	Uruguay	Rifu, Japan
19:05 UTC+9	Matsuki 11'; Shiogai 90+2'; Ueda 90+6'	Report	Araújo 42'	Stadium: Q&A Stadium; Attendance: 44,070; Referee: Alex King (Australia)

28 September Kirin Challenge Cup 2026	Japan	2–1	Venezuela	Hiroshima, Japan
19:25 UTC+9	Ueda 49', 90+6' (pen.)	Report	Kelsy 46'	Stadium: Edion Peace Wing Hiroshima; Attendance: 27,882; Referee: Tim Danaskos (Australia)

1 October 2026 Kirin Cup Soccer Semi-finals	Japan	0–0 (5–4 p)	Ecuador	Yokohama, Japan
19:10 UTC+9		Report		Stadium: Nissan Stadium; Attendance: 65,012; Referee: Wiwat Jumpaoon (Thailand)
	Penalties
	Ueda (penalty scored); Kamada (penalty scored); H. Itō (penalty scored); Sōma (penalty scored); Maeda (penalty scored)		(penalty scored) J. Caicedo; (penalty scored) Minda; (penalty missed) Castillo; (penalty scored) Sarmiento; (penalty scored) Valencia

5 October 2026 Kirin Cup Soccer Final	Japan	2–1	New Zealand	Tokyo, Japan
19:30 UTC+9	Ueda 28'; Dōan 71'	Report	Old 32'	Stadium: National Stadium; Attendance: 61,812; Referee: Nazmi Nasaruddin (Malaysia)

14 November Mizuho Blue Challenge - The Kallang Football Series Singapore	Japan	3–2	Brazil	Kallang, Singapore
18:15 UTC+8	Kubo 15'; Nakamura 19'; Sakamoto 90+1'	Report	Vinícius 33', 75'	Stadium: National Stadium; Attendance: 38,688; Referee: Jansen Foo (Singapore)

17 November Mizuho Blue Challenge - The Kallang Football Series Singapore	Japan	1–2	Paraguay	Kallang, Singapore
21:10 UTC+8	Fukuda 85'	Report	Caceres 2'; G. Gomez 40'	Stadium: National Stadium; Referee: Mongkolchai Pechsri (Thailand)

30 December Kirin Challenge Cup 2026	Japan	Cancelled	TBA	Suita, Japan
--:-- UTC+9				Stadium: Suita City Football Stadium
Note: The match was cancelled following the postponement of the 2027 AFC Asian Cup.

- Fixtures and Results (2026) – JFA.jp

=== 2027 ===
25 March Kirin Challenge Cup 2027	Japan	v	TBD	Hiroshima, Japan
--:-- UTC+9				Stadium: Edion Peace Wing Hiroshima

30 March Kirin Challenge Cup 2027	Japan	v	TBD	Tokyo, Japan
--:-- UTC+9				Stadium: National Stadium

TBA 2027 AFC Asian Cup Group F	Japan	v	Indonesia	Jeddah, Saudi Arabia
				Stadium: Prince Abdullah Al-Faisal Sports City Stadium

TBA 2027 AFC Asian Cup Group F	Thailand	v	Japan	Riyadh, Saudi Arabia
				Stadium: Al Shabab Stadium

TBA 2027 AFC Asian Cup Group F	Japan	v	Qatar	Riyadh, Saudi Arabia
				Stadium: Imam Mohammed Ibn Saud University Stadium

- Fixtures and Results (2027) – JFA.jp

== Coaching staff ==
=== Current staff ===
As of 19 November 2026

Role	Name
Manager	Vacant
Assistant coaches	(Japan) Makoto Hasebe (Japan) Ryoichi Maeda (Japan) Hiroshi Nanami (Japan) Toshihide Saito (Japan) Shunsuke Nakamura
Goalkeeping coach	(Japan) Takashi Shimoda
Fitness coach	(Japan) Ryoichi Matsumoto

- Players and staff for (2026), JFA.jp

=== Manager history ===
As of 17 November 2026 after the match against Paraguay.

Manager	Period	Record				
Manager	Period	Matches	Won	Draw	Lost	Win %
(Japan) Masujiro Nishida	1923	2	0	0	2	0%
(Japan) Goro Yamada	1925	2	0	0	2	0%
Vacant	1925	2	1	0	1	50%
(Japan) Shigeyoshi Suzuki (1st)	1930	2	1	1	0	50%
(Japan) Shigemaru Takenokoshi (1st)	1934	3	1	0	2	33.33%
(Japan) Shigeyoshi Suzuki (2nd)	1936	2	1	1	0	50%
(Japan) Shigemaru Takenokoshi (2nd)	1940	1	1	0	0	100%
(Japan) Hirokazu Ninomiya	1951	3	1	1	1	33.33%
(Japan) Shigemaru Takenokoshi (3rd)	1954–56	12	2	4	6	16.66%
(Japan) Taizo Kawamoto	1958	2	0	0	2	0%
(Japan) Shigemaru Takenokoshi (4th)	1958–59	12	4	2	6	33.33%
Vacant	1960	1	0	0	1	0%
(Japan) Hidetoki Takahashi	1961–1962	14	3	2	9	21.43%
(Japan) Ken Naganuma (1st)	1963–1969	31	18	7	6	58.06%
(Japan) Shunichiro Okano	1970–1971	19	11	2	6	57.90%
(Japan) Ken Naganuma (2nd)	1972–1976	42	16	6	20	38.09%
(Japan) Hiroshi Ninomiya	1976–1978	27	6	6	15	22.22%
(Japan) Yukio Shimomura	1979–1980	14	8	4	2	57.14%
(Japan) Masashi Watanabe	1980	3	2	0	1	66.67%
(Japan) Saburō Kawabuchi	1980–1981	10	3	2	5	30%
(Japan) Takaji Mori	1981–1985	43	22	5	16	51.16%
(Japan) Yoshinobu Ishii	1986–1987	17	11	2	4	64.70%
(Japan) Kenzo Yokoyama	1988–1991	24	5	7	12	20.83%
(Netherlands) Hans Ooft	1992–1993	27	16	7	4	59.25%
(Brazil) Paulo Roberto Falcão	1994	9	3	4	2	33.33%
(Japan) Shu Kamo	1994–1997	46	23	10	13	50%
(Japan) Takeshi Okada (1st)	1997–1998	15	5	4	6	33.33%
(France) Philippe Troussier	1998–2002	50	23	16	11	46%
(Brazil) Zico	2002–2006	71	37	16	18	52.11%
(Bosnia and Herzegovina) Ivica Osim	2006–2007	20	13	2	5	65%
(Japan) Takeshi Okada (2nd)	2007–2010	50	26	13	11	52%
(Japan) Hiromi Hara (caretaker)	2010	2	2	0	0	100%
(Italy) Alberto Zaccheroni	2010–2014	55	30	12	13	54.54%
(Mexico) Javier Aguirre	2014–2015	10	7	1	2	70%
(Bosnia and Herzegovina) Vahid Halilhodžić	2015–2018	38	21	9	8	55.26%
(Japan) Akira Nishino	2018	7	2	1	4	28.57%
(Japan) Hajime Moriyasu	2018–2026	113	77	17	19	68.14%
Manager	Period	Record				
Manager	Period	Matches	Won	Draw	Lost	Win %

== Players ==
=== Current squad ===
The following players were called up to the Mizuho Blue Challenge - The Kallang Football Series Singapore against Brazil and Paraguay on 14 and 17 November 2026, respectively.

Caps and goals as of 17 November 2026, after the match against Paraguay.

No.	Pos.	Player	Date of birth (age)	Caps	Goals	Club
1	GK	Zion Suzuki	21 August 2002 (age 24)	33	0	(The Football Association) Aston Villa
12	GK	Leo Kokubo	23 January 2001 (age 25)	1	0	(Royal Belgian Football Association) Sint-Truiden
23	GK	Tomoki Hayakawa	3 March 1999 (age 27)	5	0	(Japan Football Association) Kashima Antlers
2	DF	Yukinari Sugawara	28 June 2000 (age 26)	27	2	(Italian Football Federation) Cagliari
3	DF	Ayumu Seko	7 June 2000 (age 26)	22	0	(French Football Federation) Le Havre
4	DF	Kō Itakura (captain)	27 January 1997 (age 29)	46	2	(German Football Association) Borussia Mönchengladbach
5	DF	Tsuyoshi Watanabe	5 February 1997 (age 29)	15	0	(Royal Dutch Football Association) Feyenoord
6	DF	Shuto Nakano	27 June 2000 (age 26)	4	0	(Japan Football Association) Sanfrecce Hiroshima
16	DF	Kōki Machida	25 August 1997 (age 29)	18	0	(German Football Association) TSG Hoffenheim
21	DF	Hiroki Itō	12 May 1999 (age 27)	34	1	(German Football Association) Bayern Munich
25	DF	Junnosuke Suzuki	12 July 2003 (age 23)	14	0	(Danish Football Association) Copenhagen
7	MF	Yūki Sōma	25 February 1997 (age 29)	23	5	(Japan Football Association) Machida Zelvia
8	MF	Takumi Minamino	16 January 1995 (age 31)	75	26	(French Football Federation) Monaco (Note: Monaco is a Monégasque club playing in the French football league system.)
10	MF	Ritsu Dōan	16 June 1998 (age 28)	75	12	(German Football Association) Eintracht Frankfurt
13	MF	Keito Nakamura	28 July 2000 (age 26)	34	12	(French Football Federation) Lyon
14	MF	Junya Itō	9 March 1993 (age 33)	79	16	(Royal Belgian Football Association) Genk
17	MF	Ao Tanaka	10 September 1998 (age 28)	47	8	(The Football Association) Leeds United
20	MF	Takefusa Kubo	4 June 2001 (age 25)	56	8	(Royal Spanish Football Federation) Real Sociedad
22	MF	Kodai Sano	25 September 2003 (age 23)	6	0	(Royal Dutch Football Association) PSV
24	MF	Kaishū Sano	30 December 2000 (age 25)	21	1	(German Football Association) Mainz 05
26	MF	Tatsuhiro Sakamoto	22 October 1996 (age 30)	4	1	(The Football Association) Coventry City
27	MF	Kuryu Matsuki	30 April 2003 (age 23)	2	1	(The Football Association) Southampton
9	FW	Keisuke Gotō	3 June 2005 (age 21)	7	0	(German Football Association) SC Freiburg
11	FW	Daizen Maeda	20 October 1997 (age 29)	34	5	(The Football Association) Ipswich Town
18	FW	Yuito Suzuki	25 October 2001 (age 25)	10	0	(German Football Association) SC Freiburg
19	FW	Kōki Ogawa	8 August 1997 (age 29)	20	11	(Japan Football Association) Machida Zelvia
28	FW	Shiō Fukuda	8 April 2004 (age 22)	1	1	(German Football Association) Karlsruher SC

=== Recent call-ups ===
The following players have also been called up to the squad within the last 12 months.

Pos.	Player	Date of birth (age)	Caps	Goals	Club	Latest call-up
GK	Keisuke Ōsako	28 July 1999 (age 27)	11	0	(Japan) Sanfrecce Hiroshima	2026 FIFA World Cup
DF	Hayato Araki	7 August 1996 (age 30)	5	0	(Japan) Sanfrecce Hiroshima	v. New Zealand, 5 October 2026
DF	Tomoya Ando	10 January 1999 (age 27)	3	0	(Germany) FC St. Pauli	v. Venezuela, 28 September 2026 ^{INJ}
DF	Takehiro Tomiyasu	5 November 1998 (age 28)	46	1	(England) Crystal Palace	v. Uruguay, 24 September 2026 ^{INJ}
DF	Yūto Nagatomo	12 September 1986 (age 40)	146	4	(Japan) FC Tokyo	2026 FIFA World Cup
DF	Shōgo Taniguchi	15 July 1991 (age 35)	41	1	(Belgium) Sint-Truiden	2026 FIFA World Cup
DF	Maya Yoshida	24 August 1988 (age 38)	127	12	(United States) LA Galaxy	v. Iceland, 31 May 2026
DF	Daiki Hashioka	17 May 1999 (age 27)	12	0	(Germany) Borussia Mönchengladbach	v. England, 31 March 2026
MF	Daichi Kamada	5 August 1996 (age 30)	58	14	(England) Crystal Palace	v. Paraguay, 17 November 2026 ^{WD}
MF	Henry Heroki Mochizuki	20 September 2001 (age 25)	5	1	(Japan) Machida Zelvia	v. New Zealand, 5 October 2026
MF	Satoshi Tanaka	13 August 2002 (age 24)	3	0	(Germany) Schalke 04	v. New Zealand, 5 October 2026
MF	Shunsuke Saito	26 April 2005 (age 21)	1	0	(Belgium) Westerlo	v. New Zealand, 5 October 2026
MF	Koki Kumasaka	15 April 2001 (age 25)	1	0	(Japan) Kashiwa Reysol	v. Ecuador, 1 October 2026 ^{INJ}
MF	Ryūnosuke Satō	16 October 2006 (age 20)	6	0	(Spain) Valencia	v. Venezuela, 28 September 2026 ^{WD}
MF	Wataru Endo ^{RET}	9 February 1993 (age 33)	73	4	(England) Liverpool	2026 FIFA World Cup ^{INJ}
MF	Kaoru Mitoma	20 May 1997 (age 29)	31	9	(England) Brighton & Hove Albion	v. England, 31 March 2026
MF	Joel Chima Fujita	16 February 2002 (age 24)	8	0	(Germany) FC St. Pauli	v. England, 31 March 2026
FW	Ayase Ueda	28 August 1998 (age 28)	47	22	(France) Lille	v. New Zealand, 5 October 2026
FW	Kento Shiogai	26 March 2005 (age 21)	6	1	(Germany) VfL Wolfsburg	v. New Zealand, 5 October 2026
FW	Kaina Tanimura	5 March 1998 (age 28)	2	0	(Japan) Yokohama F. Marinos	v. New Zealand, 5 October 2026
FW	Shūto Machino	30 September 1999 (age 27)	15	5	(Germany) Borussia Mönchengladbach	2026 FIFA World Cup
^{INJ} Withdrew due to injury^{PRE} Preliminary squad / standby^{SUS} Serving suspension^{WD} Player withdrew from the squad due to non-injury issue^{RET} Retired from the national team.

== Records ==
As of 25 June 2026.
Players in bold are still active with Japan.

=== Most appearances ===
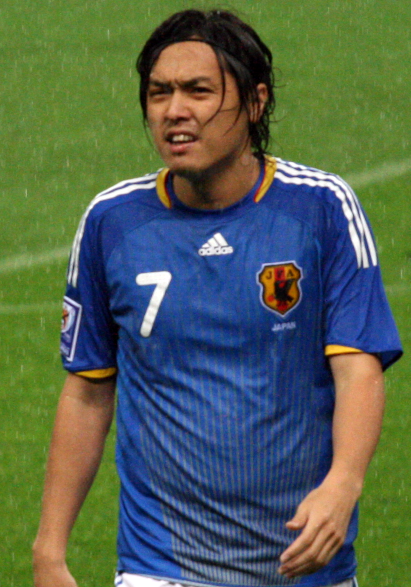
Yasuhito Endō is Japan's most capped player with 152 appearances.

Rank	Player	Caps	Goals	Pos.	Career	Ref.
1	Yasuhito Endō	152	15	MF	2002–2015	
2	**Yūto Nagatomo**	146	4	DF	2008–present	
3	Maya Yoshida	127	12	DF	2010–2026	
4	Masami Ihara	122	5	DF	1988–1999	
5	Shinji Okazaki	119	50	FW	2008–2019	
6	Yoshikatsu Kawaguchi	116	0	GK	1997–2010	
7	Makoto Hasebe	114	2	MF	2006–2018	
8	Yuji Nakazawa	110	17	DF	1999–2010	
9	Keisuke Honda	98	37	MF	2008–2018	
9	Shunsuke Nakamura	98	24	MF	2000–2010	

=== Top goalscorers ===
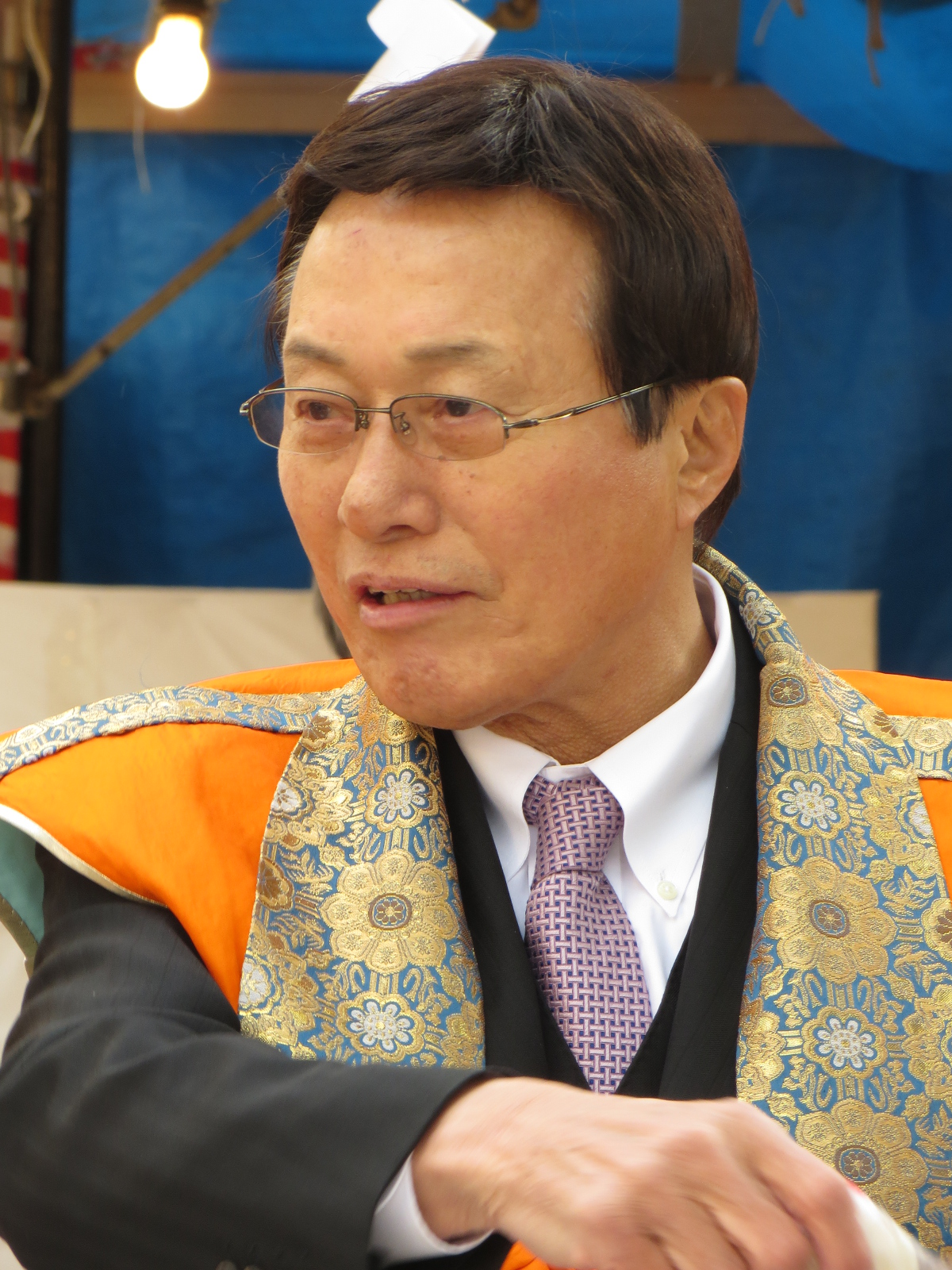
Kunishige Kamamoto is Japan's top scorer with 75 goals.

Rank	Player	Goals	Caps	Ratio	Career	Ref.
1	Kunishige Kamamoto (list)	75	76	0.99	1964–1977	
2	Kazuyoshi Miura	55	89	0.62	1990–2000	
3	Shinji Okazaki	50	119	0.42	2008–2019	
4	Hiromi Hara	37	75	0.49	1978–1988	
4	Keisuke Honda	37	98	0.38	2008–2018	
6	Shinji Kagawa	31	97	0.32	2008–2019	
7	Takuya Takagi	27	44	0.61	1992–1997	
8	Kazushi Kimura	26	54	0.48	1979–1986	
8	**Takumi Minamino**	26	73	0.35	2015–present	
10	Yuya Osako	25	57	0.44	2013–2022	

=== Captains ===
Player	Pos.	Period	Note
Shigeo Yaegashi	**MF**	1968	**Summer Olympics** bronze medalist leading captain (1968)
Aritatsu Ogi	**MF**	1969–1974	
Kunishige Kamamoto	**FW**	1975–1977	
Nobuo Fujishima	**MF**	1978	
Hiroshi Ochiai	**MF** **DF**	1978–1979	
Hideki Maeda	**MF**	1980–1981	
Mitsuhisa Taguchi	**GK**	1982–1984	
Kazushi Kimura	**MF**	1986	
Hisashi Kato	**DF**	1985–1987	
Hiromi Hara	**FW**	1988	
Shigetatsu Matsunaga	**GK**	1989	
Shinichi Morishita	**GK**	1990	
Tetsuji Hashiratani	**MF**	1991–1995	**AFC Asian Cup** winning captain (1992)
Masami Ihara	**DF**	1996–1999	
Masashi Nakayama	**FW**	2001	**FIFA Confederations Cup** runners-up leading captain (2001)
Ryuzo Morioka	**CB**	2000–2002	**AFC Asian Cup** winning captain (2000)
Hidetoshi Nakata	**CM**	2002–2004	
Tsuneyasu Miyamoto	**CB**	2003–2006	**AFC Asian Cup** winning captain (2004), **East Asian Football Championship** runners-up leading captain (2003) (2005)
Yoshikatsu Kawaguchi	**GK**	2006–2008	**East Asian Football Championship** runners-up leading captain (2008)
Yuji Nakazawa	**CB**	2008–2010	**East Asian Football Championship** third place leading captain (2010)
Makoto Hasebe	**DM**	2010–2018	**AFC Asian Cup** winning captain (2011)
Yuichi Komano	**DF**	2013	**EAFF East Asian Cup** winning captain (2013)
Gen Shoji	**CB**	2017	**EAFF E-1 Championship** runners-up leading captain (2017)
Maya Yoshida	**CB**	2018–2022	**AFC Asian Cup** runners-up leading captain (2019)
Sho Sasaki	**LB**	2019	**EAFF E-1 Championship** runners-up leading captain (2019)
Shōgo Taniguchi	**CB**	2022	**EAFF E-1 Championship** winning captain (2022)
Wataru Endo	**DM**	2023–2026	
Kō Itakura	**CB**	2026–	

== Competitive record ==
Champions Runners-up Third place Fourth place

*Denotes draws includes knockout matches decided on penalty shootouts. Red border indicates that the tournament was hosted on home soil. Gold, silver, bronze backgrounds indicate 1st, 2nd and 3rd finishes respectively. Bold text indicates best finish in tournament.

=== FIFA World Cup ===
FIFA World Cup record										Qualification record					
Year	Result	Position	Pld	W	D	L	GF	GA	Squad	Pld	W	D	L	GF	GA
(Uruguay) 1930	Withdrew									Qualified as invitees					
(Italy) 1934	Did not enter									Did not enter					
(France) 1938	Withdrew									Withdrew					
(Brazil) 1950	Suspended from FIFA									Suspended from FIFA					
(Switzerland) 1954	Did not qualify									2	0	1	1	3	7
(Sweden) 1958	Did not enter									Did not enter					
(Chile) 1962	Did not qualify									2	0	0	2	1	4
(England) 1966	Did not enter									Did not enter					
(Mexico) 1970	Did not qualify									4	0	2	2	4	8
(West Germany) 1974	Did not qualify									4	1	0	3	5	4
(Argentina) 1978	Did not qualify									4	0	1	3	0	5
(Spain) 1982	Did not qualify									4	2	0	2	4	2
(Mexico) 1986	Did not qualify									8	5	1	2	15	5
(Italy) 1990	Did not qualify									6	2	3	1	7	3
(United States) 1994	Did not qualify									13	9	3	1	35	6
(France) 1998	Group stage	31st	3	0	0	3	1	4	Squad	15	9	5	1	51	12
(South Korea) (Japan) 2002	Round of 16	9th	4	2	1	1	5	3	Squad	Qualified as co-hosts					
(Germany) 2006	Group stage	28th	3	0	1	2	2	7	Squad	12	11	0	1	25	5
(South Africa) 2010	Round of 16	9th	4	2	1	1	4	2	Squad	14	8	4	2	23	9
(Brazil) 2014	Group stage	29th	3	0	1	2	2	6	Squad	14	8	3	3	30	8
(Russia) 2018	Round of 16	15th	4	1	1	2	6	7	Squad	18	13	3	2	44	7
(Qatar) 2022	Round of 16	9th	4	2	1	1	5	4	Squad	18	15	1	2	58	6
(Canada) (Mexico) (United States) 2026	Round of 32	21st	4	1	2	1	8	5	Squad	16	13	2	1	54	3
(Spain) (Portugal) (Morocco) 2030	To be determined									To be determined					
(Saudi Arabia) 2034	To be determined									To be determined					
Total	Round of 16	8/23	29	8	8	13	33	38	—	154	96	29	29	359	94

==== Match history ====
FIFA World Cup history
Year	Round	Opponent	Score	Result
1998	Group stage	Argentina	**0–1**	Loss
1998	Group stage	Croatia	**0–1**	Loss
1998	Group stage	Jamaica	**1–2**	Loss
2002	Group stage	Belgium	**2–2**	Draw
2002	Group stage	Russia	**1–0**	Win
2002	Group stage	Tunisia	**2–0**	Win
2002	Round of 16	Turkey	**0–1**	Loss
2006	Group stage	Australia	**1–3**	Loss
2006	Group stage	Croatia	**0–0**	Draw
2006	Group stage	Brazil	**1–4**	Loss
2010	Group stage	Cameroon	**1–0**	Win
2010	Group stage	Netherlands	**0–1**	Loss
2010	Group stage	Denmark	**3–1**	Win
2010	Round of 16	Paraguay	**0–0** (3–5 p)	Draw (Loss)
2014	Group stage	Ivory Coast	**1–2**	Loss
2014	Group stage	Greece	**0–0**	Draw
2014	Group stage	Colombia	**1–4**	Loss
2018	Group stage	Colombia	**2–1**	Win
2018	Group stage	Senegal	**2–2**	Draw
2018	Group stage	Poland	**0–1**	Loss
2018	Round of 16	Belgium	**2–3**	Loss
2022	Group stage	Germany	**2–1**	Win
2022	Group stage	Costa Rica	**0–1**	Loss
2022	Group stage	Spain	**2–1**	Win
2022	Round of 16	Croatia	**1–1** (1–3 p)	Draw (Loss)
2026	Group stage	Netherlands	**2–2**	Draw
2026	Group stage	Tunisia	**4–0**	Win
2026	Group stage	Sweden	**1–1**	Draw
2026	Round of 32	Brazil	**1–2**	Loss

=== AFC Asian Cup ===
AFC Asian Cup record										Qualification record					
Year	Result	Position	Pld	W	D	L	GF	GA	Squad	Pld	W	D	L	GF	GA
(British Hong Kong) 1956	Withdrew									Withdrew					
(South Korea) 1960	Withdrew									Withdrew					
(Israel) 1964	Withdrew									Withdrew					
(Iran) 1968	Did not qualify									4	3	1	0	8	4
(Thailand) 1972	Withdrew									Withdrew					
(Iran) 1976	Did not qualify									5	2	1	2	4	4
(Kuwait) 1980	Withdrew									Withdrew					
(Singapore) 1984	Withdrew									Withdrew					
(Qatar) 1988	Group stage	10th	4	0	1	3	0	6	Squad	4	2	1	1	6	3
(Japan) 1992	**Champions**	**1st**	**5**	**3**	**2**	**0**	**6**	**3**	**Squad**	Qualified as hosts					
(United Arab Emirates) 1996	Quarter-finals	5th	4	3	0	1	7	3	Squad	Qualified as defending champions					
(Lebanon) 2000	**Champions**	**1st**	**6**	**5**	**1**	**0**	**21**	**6**	**Squad**	3	3	0	0	15	0
(China) 2004	**Champions**	**1st**	**6**	**4**	**2**	**0**	**13**	**6**	**Squad**	Qualified as defending champions					
(Indonesia) (Malaysia) (Thailand) (Vietnam) 2007	Semi-finals	4th	6	2	3	1	11	7	Squad	6	5	0	1	15	2
(Qatar) 2011	**Champions**	**1st**	**6**	**4**	**2**	**0**	**14**	**6**	**Squad**	6	5	0	1	17	4
(Australia) 2015	Quarter-finals	5th	4	3	1	0	8	1	Squad	Qualified as defending champions					
(United Arab Emirates) 2019	**Runners-up**	**2nd**	**7**	**6**	**0**	**1**	**12**	**6**	Squad	8	7	1	0	27	0
(Qatar) 2023	Quarter-finals	7th	5	3	0	2	12	8	Squad	8	8	0	0	46	2
(Saudi Arabia) 2027	Qualified									6	6	0	0	24	0
Total	4 Titles	11/19	53	33	12	8	104	52	—	50	41	4	5	162	19

==== Match history ====
AFC Asian Cup history
Year	Round	Opponent	Score	Result
1988	Group stage	Iran	**0–0**	Draw
1988	Group stage	South Korea	**0–2**	Loss
1988	Group stage	United Arab Emirates	**0–1**	Loss
1988	Group stage	Qatar	**0–3**	Loss
1992	Group stage	United Arab Emirates	**0–0**	Draw
1992	Group stage	North Korea	**1–1**	Draw
1992	Group stage	Iran	**1–0**	Win
1992	Semi-finals	China	**3–2**	Win
1992	Final	Saudi Arabia	**1–0**	Win
1996	Group stage	Syria	**2–1**	Win
1996	Group stage	Uzbekistan	**4–0**	Win
1996	Group stage	China	**1–0**	Win
1996	Quarter-finals	Kuwait	**0–2**	Loss
2000	Group stage	Saudi Arabia	**4–1**	Win
2000	Group stage	Uzbekistan	**8–1**	Win
2000	Group stage	Qatar	**1–1**	Draw
2000	Quarter-finals	Iraq	**4–1**	Win
2000	Semi-finals	China	**3–2**	Win
2000	Final	Saudi Arabia	**1–0**	Win
2004	Group stage	Oman	**1–0**	Win
2004	Group stage	Thailand	**4–1**	Win
2004	Group stage	Iran	**0–0**	Draw
2004	Quarter-finals	Jordan	**1–1** (4–3 p)	Draw (Win)
2004	Semi-finals	Bahrain	**4–3**	Win
2004	Final	China	**3–1**	Win
2007	Group stage	Qatar	**1–1**	Draw
2007	Group stage	United Arab Emirates	**3–1**	Win
2007	Group stage	Vietnam	**4–1**	Win
2007	Quarter-finals	Australia	**1–1** (4–3 p)	Draw (Win)
2007	Semi-finals	Saudi Arabia	**2–3**	Loss
2007	Third place play-off	South Korea	**0–0** (5–6 p)	Draw (Loss)
2011	Group stage	Jordan	**1–1**	Draw
2011	Group stage	Syria	**2–1**	Win
2011	Group stage	Saudi Arabia	**5–0**	Win
2011	Quarter-finals	Qatar	**3–2**	Win
2011	Semi-finals	South Korea	**2–2** (3–0 p)	Draw (Win)
2011	Final	Australia	**1–0**	Win
2015	Group stage	Palestine	**4–0**	Win
2015	Group stage	Iraq	**1–0**	Win
2015	Group stage	Jordan	**2–0**	Win
2015	Quarter-finals	United Arab Emirates	**1–1** (4–5 p)	Draw (Loss)
2019	Group stage	Turkmenistan	**3–2**	Win
2019	Group stage	Oman	**1–0**	Win
2019	Group stage	Uzbekistan	**2–1**	Win
2019	Round of 16	Saudi Arabia	**1–0**	Win
2019	Quarter-finals	Vietnam	**1–0**	Win
2019	Semi-finals	Iran	**3–0**	Win
2019	Final	Qatar	**1–3**	Loss
2023	Group stage	Vietnam	**4–2**	Win
2023	Group stage	Iraq	**1–2**	Loss
2023	Group stage	Indonesia	**3–1**	Win
2023	Round of 16	Bahrain	**3–1**	Win
2023	Quarter-finals	Iran	**1–2**	Loss

=== Copa América ===
Japan was the first team from outside the Americas to participate in the Copa América, having been invited to the 1999 tournament. Japan was also invited in 2011 and initially accepted the invitation. However, following the Tōhoku earthquake, the JFA later withdrew on 16 May 2011, citing the difficulty of releasing some Japanese players from European teams to play as replacements. On the next day, CONMEBOL invited Costa Rica to replace Japan in the competition.

On 16 August 2013, CONMEBOL president Eugenio Figueredo announced that Japan was invited to the 2015 Copa América. However, Japan later declined the invitation due to scheduling problems.

On 14 May 2018, CONMEBOL announced that Japan, alongside Qatar, would be the two invited teams for the 2019 Copa América.

Copa América record
Year	Result	Position	Pld	W	D	L	GF	GA	Squad
(Paraguay) 1999	Group stage	10th	3	0	1	2	3	8	Squad
(Argentina) 2011	Withdrew								
(Chile) 2015	Withdrew								
(Brazil) 2019	Group stage	9th	3	0	2	1	3	7	Squad
Total	Group stage	2/4	6	0	3	3	6	15	—

==== Match history ====
CONMEBOL Copa América history
Year	Round	Opponent	Score	Result	Stadium
1999	Group stage	Peru	2–3	Loss	Estadio Defensores del Chaco, Asunción
1999	Group stage	Paraguay	0–4	Loss	Estadio Defensores del Chaco, Asunción
1999	Group stage	Bolivia	1–1	Draw	Monumental Rio Parapiti, Pedro Juan Caballero
2019	Group stage	Chile	0–4	Loss	Estádio do Morumbi, São Paulo
2019	Group stage	Uruguay	2–2	Draw	Arena do Grêmio, Porto Alegre
2019	Group stage	Ecuador	1–1	Draw	Estádio Mineirão, Belo Horizonte

=== FIFA Confederations Cup ===
FIFA Confederations Cup record
year	Result	Position	Pld	W	D	L	GF	GA	Squad
(Saudi Arabia) 1992	Did not qualify								
(Saudi Arabia) 1995	Group stage	6th	2	0	0	2	1	8	Squad
(Saudi Arabia) 1997	Did not qualify								
(Mexico) 1999	Did not qualify								
(South Korea) (Japan) 2001	**Runners-up**	**2nd**	**5**	**3**	**1**	**1**	**6**	**1**	Squad
(France) 2003	Group stage	6th	3	1	0	2	4	3	Squad
(Germany) 2005	Group stage	5th	3	1	1	1	4	4	Squad
(South Africa) 2009	Did not qualify								
(Brazil) 2013	Group stage	7th	3	0	0	3	4	9	Squad
(Russia) 2017	Did not qualify								
Total	Runners-up	5/10	16	5	2	9	19	25	—

==== Match history ====
FIFA Confederations Cup history
Year	Round	Opponent	Score	Result
1995	Group stage	Nigeria	0–3	Loss
1995	Group stage	Argentina	1–5	Loss
2001	Group stage	Canada	3–0	Win
2001	Group stage	Cameroon	2–0	Win
2001	Group stage	Brazil	0–0	Draw
2001	Semi-finals	Australia	1–0	Win
2001	Final	France	0–1	Loss
2003	Group stage	New Zealand	3–0	Win
2003	Group stage	France	1–2	Loss
2003	Group stage	Colombia	0–1	Loss
2005	Group stage	Mexico	1–2	Loss
2005	Group stage	Greece	1–0	Win
2005	Group stage	Brazil	2–2	Draw
2013	Group stage	Brazil	0–3	Loss
2013	Group stage	Italy	3–4	Loss
2013	Group stage	Mexico	1–2	Loss

=== Olympic Games ===
Summer Olympics record											Qualification record					
Year	Result	Position	M	W	D	L	GF	GA	Squad		M	W	D	L	GF	GA
(United Kingdom) 1908	Did not enter										Did not enter					
(Sweden) 1912	Did not enter										Did not enter					
1916	Did not enter										Did not enter					
(Belgium) 1920	Did not enter										Did not enter					
(France) 1924	Did not enter										Did not enter					
(Netherlands) 1928
1932
(Germany) 1936	Quarter-finals	8th	2	1	0	1	3	10	Squad		No qualification					
1940																
1944																
(United Kingdom) 1948	Did not enter										Did not enter					
(Finland) 1952	Did not enter										Did not enter					
(Australia) 1956	First round	10th	1	0	0	1	0	2	Squad		No qualification					
(Italy) 1960	Did not qualify										2	1	0	1	1	2
(Japan) 1964	Quarter-finals	8th	3	1	0	3	6	15	Squad		Qualified as hosts					
(Mexico) 1968	**Bronze medal**	**3rd**	**6**	**3**	**2**	**1**	**9**	**8**	Squad		5	4	1	0	26	4
(West Germany) 1972	Did not qualify										4	2	0	2	14	7
(Canada) 1976	Did not qualify										6	2	1	3	9	11
(Soviet Union) 1980	Did not qualify										5	3	1	1	16	5
(United States) 1984	Did not qualify									10	3	1	6	26	17	
(South Korea) 1988	Did not qualify									8	6	1	1	19	3	
1992–present	See Japan national under-23 team									See Japan national under-23 team						
Total	Bronze medal	04/21	12	5	2	6	18	35	—	40	21	5	14	111	49	

==== Match history ====
Summer Olympics history
Year	Round	Opponent	Score	Result
1936	First round	Sweden	3–2	Win
1936	Quarter-finals	Italy	0–8	Loss
1956	First round	Australia	0–2	Loss
1964	Group stage	Argentina	3–2	Win
1964	Group stage	Ghana	2–3	Loss
1964	Quarter-finals	Czechoslovakia	0–4	Loss
1968	Group stage	Nigeria	3–1	Win
1968	Group stage	Brazil	1–1	Draw
1968	Group stage	Spain	0–0	Draw
1968	Quarter-finals	France	3–1	Win
1968	Semi-finals	Hungary	0–5	Loss
1968	Bronze play-off	Mexico	2–0	Win

=== Asian Games ===
Asian Games record
Year	Result	Position	M	W	D	L	GF	GA	Squad
(India) 1951	**Third place**	**3rd**	**3**	**1**	**1**	**1**	**4**	**3**	**Squad**
(Philippines) 1954	Group stage	10th	2	0	0	2	5	8	Squad
(Japan) 1958	Group stage	12th	2	0	0	2	0	3	Squad
(Indonesia) 1962	Group stage	6th	3	1	0	2	3	4	Squad
(Thailand) 1966	**Third place**	**3rd**	**7**	**6**	**0**	**1**	**18**	**5**	**Squad**
(Thailand) 1970	Fourth place	4th	7	5	0	2	8	5	Squad
(Iran) 1974	Group stage	9th	3	1	1	1	5	4	Squad
(Thailand) 1978	Group stage	9th	3	1	0	2	5	5	Squad
(India) 1982	Quarter-finals	5th	4	3	0	1	6	3	Squad
(South Korea) 1986	Group stage	9th	4	2	0	2	9	4	Squad
(China) 1990	Quarter-finals	8th	3	1	0	2	3	3	Squad
(Japan) 1994	Quarter-finals	7th	4	1	2	1	9	5	Squad
(Thailand) 1998	Group stage	9th	5	3	0	2	8	4	Squad
2002–present	See Japan national under-23 football team								
Total	Third place	13/13	50	25	4	21	83	56	—

==== Match history ====
Asian Games history
Year	Round	Opponent	Score	Result
1951	Semi-finals	Iran	0–0	Draw
1951	Replay match	Iran	2–3	Loss
1951	Bronze play-off	Afghanistan	2–0	Win
1954	First round	Indonesia	3–5	Loss
1954	First round	India	2–3	Loss
1958	First round	Philippines	0–1	Loss
1958	First round	Hong Kong	0–2	Loss
1962	First round	Thailand	3–1	Win
1962	First round	India	0–2	Loss
1962	First round	South Korea	0–1	Loss
1966	First round	India	2–1	Win
1966	First round	Iran	3–1	Win
1966	First round	Malaysia	1–0	Win
1966	Second round	Singapore	5–1	Win
1966	Second round	Thailand	5–1	Win
1966	Semi-finals	Iran	0–1	Loss
1966	Bronze play-off	Singapore	2–0	Win
1970	First round	Malaysia	1–0	Win
1970	First round	Khmer Republic	1–0	Win
1970	First round	Burma	2–1	Win
1970	Second round	Indonesia	2–1	Win
1970	Second round	India	1–0	Win
1970	Semi-finals	South Korea	1–2	Loss
1970	Bronze play-off	India	0–1	Loss
1974	First round	Philippines	4–0	Win
1974	First round	Malaysia	1–1	Draw
1974	First round	Israel	0–3	Loss
1978	First round	Kuwait	0–2	Loss
1978	First round	Bahrain	4–0	Win
1978	First round	South Korea	1–3	Loss
1982	First round	Iran	1–0	Win
1982	First round	South Yemen	3–1	Win
1982	First round	South Korea	2–1	Win
1982	Quarter-finals	Iraq	0–1	Loss
1986	First round	Nepal	5–0	Win
1986	First round	Iran	0–2	Loss
1986	First round	Kuwait	0–2	Loss
1986	First round	Bangladesh	4–0	Win
1990	First round	Bangladesh	3–0	Win
1990	First round	Saudi Arabia	0–2	Loss
1990	Quarter-finals	Iran	0–1	Loss
1994	First round	UAE	1–1	Draw
1994	First round	Qatar	1–1	Draw
1994	First round	Myanmar	5–0	Win
1994	Quarter-finals	South Korea	2–3	Loss
1998	First round	Nepal	5–0	Win
1998	First round	India	1–0	Win
1998	Second round	South Korea	0–2	Loss
1998	Second round	Kuwait	2–1	Win
1998	Second round	UAE	0–1	Loss

=== EAFF E-1 Championship ===
EAFF E-1 Championship record
Year	Result	Position	Pld	W	D	L	GF	GA	Squad
(Japan) 2003	**Runners-up**	**2nd**	**3**	**2**	**1**	**0**	**3**	**0**	Squad
(South Korea) 2005	**Runners-up**	**2nd**	**3**	**1**	**1**	**1**	**3**	**3**	Squad
(China) 2008	**Runners-up**	**2nd**	**3**	**1**	**2**	**0**	**3**	**2**	Squad
(Japan) 2010	**Third place**	**3rd**	**3**	**1**	**1**	**1**	**4**	**3**	Squad
(South Korea) 2013	**Champions**	**1st**	**3**	**2**	**1**	**0**	**8**	**6**	**Squad**
(China) 2015	Fourth place	4th	3	0	2	1	3	4	Squad
(Japan) 2017	**Runners-up**	**2nd**	**3**	**2**	**0**	**1**	**4**	**5**	Squad
(South Korea) 2019	**Runners-up**	**2nd**	**3**	**2**	**0**	**1**	**7**	**2**	Squad
(Japan) 2022	**Champions**	**1st**	**3**	**2**	**1**	**0**	**9**	**0**	Squad
(South Korea) 2025	**Champions**	**1st**	**3**	**3**	**0**	**0**	**9**	**1**	Squad
Total	3 Title	10/10	30	16	9	5	53	26	—

==== Match history ====
EAFF E-1 Championship history
Year	Round	Opponent	Score	Result
2003	First match	China	2–0	Win
2003	Second match	Hong Kong	1–0	Win
2003	Third match	South Korea	0–0	Draw
2005	First match	North Korea	0–1	Loss
2005	Second match	China	2–2	Draw
2005	Third match	South Korea	1–0	Win
2008	First match	North Korea	1–1	Draw
2008	Second match	China	1–0	Win
2008	Third match	South Korea	1–1	Draw
2010	First match	China	0–0	Draw
2010	Second match	Hong Kong	3–0	Win
2010	Third match	South Korea	1–3	Loss
2013	First match	China	3–3	Draw
2013	Second match	Australia	3–2	Win
2013	Third match	South Korea	2–1	Win
2015	First match	North Korea	1–2	Loss
2015	Second match	South Korea	1–1	Draw
2015	Third match	China	1–1	Draw
2017	First match	North Korea	1–0	Win
2017	Second match	China	2–1	Win
2017	Third match	South Korea	1–4	Loss
2019	First match	China	2–1	Win
2019	Second match	Hong Kong	5–0	Win
2019	Third match	South Korea	0–1	Loss
2022	First match	Hong Kong	6–0	Win
2022	Second match	China	0–0	Draw
2022	Third match	South Korea	3–0	Win
2025	First match	Hong Kong	6–1	Win
2025	Second match	China	2–0	Win
2025	Third match	South Korea	1–0	Win

== Head-to-head record ==
The following table shows Japan's all-time international record, correct as of 5 October 2026.

Opponent	Confederation	From	To	Pld	W	D	L	GF	GA	GD
Afghanistan	AFC	1951	2015	3	3	0	0	13	0	+13
Angola	CAF	2005	2005	1	1	0	0	1	0	+1
Argentina	CONMEBOL	1988	2010	8	1	0	7	4	16	−12
Australia	AFC	1956	2025	29	11	10	7	40	32	+8
Austria	UEFA	2007	2007	1	0	1	0	0	0	0
Azerbaijan	UEFA	2012	2012	1	1	0	0	2	0	+2
Bahrain	AFC	1978	2025	14	11	1	2	28	11	+17
Bangladesh	AFC	1975	1993	5	5	0	0	22	1	+21
Belarus	UEFA	2013	2013	1	0	0	1	0	1	−1
Belgium	UEFA	1999	2018	6	2	2	2	11	8	+3
Bolivia	CONMEBOL	1999	2025	4	3	1	0	7	1	+6
Bosnia and Herzegovina	UEFA	2006	2016	3	1	1	1	6	4	+2
Brazil	CONMEBOL	1989	2026	15	1	2	12	9	39	−30
Brunei	AFC	1980	2000	4	4	0	0	29	1	+28
Bulgaria	UEFA	1976	2016	6	1	1	4	10	13	−3
Cambodia	AFC	1964	2015	4	4	0	0	10	0	+10
Cameroon	CAF	2001	2020	6	3	3	0	5	0	+5
Canada	CONCACAF	2001	2023	4	3	0	1	10	4	+6
Chile	CONMEBOL	2008	2019	3	1	1	1	4	4	0
China	AFC	1975	2025	33	18	8	7	49	29	+20
Chinese Taipei	AFC	1963	1983	7	6	0	1	24	7	+17
Colombia	CONMEBOL	2003	2023	6	1	1	4	4	9	−5
Costa Rica	CONCACAF	1995	2022	5	3	1	1	10	3	+7
Croatia	UEFA	1997	2022	4	1	2	1	5	5	0
Cyprus	UEFA	2014	2014	1	1	0	0	1	0	+1
Czech Republic	UEFA	1998	2011	3	1	2	0	1	0	+1
Denmark	UEFA	1971	2010	2	1	0	1	5	4	+1
Ecuador	CONMEBOL	1995	2026	5	2	3	0	5	1	+4
Egypt	CAF	1998	2007	2	2	0	0	5	1	+4
El Salvador	CONCACAF	2019	2023	2	2	0	0	8	0	+8
England	UEFA	1995	2026	4	1	1	2	4	5	−1
Finland	UEFA	2006	2009	2	2	0	0	7	1	+6
France	UEFA	1968	2012	6	1	1	4	5	14	−9
Germany	UEFA	2004	2023	4	2	1	1	8	7	+1
Ghana	CAF	1994	2025	8	6	0	2	18	11	+7
Greece	UEFA	2005	2014	2	1	1	0	1	0	+1
Guatemala	CONCACAF	2010	2013	2	2	0	0	5	1	+4
Haiti	CONCACAF	2017	2017	1	0	1	0	3	3	0
Honduras	CONCACAF	2002	2014	3	2	1	0	14	7	+7
Hong Kong	AFC	1958	2025	28	17	6	5	65	18	+47
Hungary	UEFA	1993	2004	2	0	0	2	2	4	−2
Iceland	UEFA	1971	2026	4	4	0	0	9	3	+6
India	AFC	1954	2006	18	11	1	6	41	19	+22
Indonesia	AFC	1954	2025	18	11	2	5	46	24	+22
Iran	AFC	1951	2024	19	6	6	7	22	21	+1
Iraq	AFC	1978	2024	13	7	3	3	19	10	+9
Israel	UEFA	1973	1977	5	0	0	5	1	10	−9
Italy	UEFA	2001	2013	2	0	1	1	4	5	−1
Ivory Coast	CAF	1993	2020	5	3	0	2	4	4	0
Jamaica	CONCACAF	1998	2014	4	2	1	1	7	3	+4
Jordan	AFC	1988	2015	6	2	3	1	12	5	+7
Kazakhstan	UEFA	1997	2005	3	2	1	0	10	2	+8
Kuwait	AFC	1978	1998	5	1	0	4	2	8	−6
Kyrgyzstan	AFC	2018	2021	3	3	0	0	11	1	+10
Latvia	UEFA	2005	2013	2	1	1	0	5	2	+3
Macau	AFC	1980	2000	5	5	0	0	45	0	+45
Malaysia	AFC	1958	2004	35	13	11	11	56	55	+1
Mali	CAF	2018	2018	1	0	1	0	1	1	0
Malta	UEFA	2006	2006	1	1	0	0	1	0	+1
Mexico	CONCACAF	1996	2025	6	1	1	4	5	9	−4
Mongolia	AFC	1942	2021	5	5	0	0	71	0	+71
Montenegro	UEFA	2007	2007	1	1	0	0	2	0	+2
Myanmar	AFC	1994	2024	5	5	0	0	27	0	+27
Nepal	AFC	1986	1998	4	4	0	0	19	0	+19
Netherlands	UEFA	2009	2026	4	0	2	2	4	8	−4
New Zealand	OFC	1981	2026	5	4	0	1	11	5	+6
Nigeria	CAF	1995	2003	2	1	0	1	3	3	0
North Korea	AFC	1975	2024	22	10	4	8	23	16	+7
Norway	UEFA	2002	2002	1	0	0	1	0	3	−3
Oman	AFC	1988	2021	14	10	3	1	21	5	+16
Pakistan	AFC	1960	1988	3	1	1	1	6	5	+1
Palestine	AFC	2015	2015	1	1	0	0	4	0	+4
Panama	CONCACAF	2018	2020	2	2	0	0	4	0	+4
Paraguay	CONMEBOL	1995	2025	12	5	5	2	17	12	+5
Peru	CONMEBOL	1999	2023	6	2	2	2	8	5	+3
Philippines	AFC	1917	1974	13	8	0	5	33	33	0
Poland	UEFA	1981	2018	7	2	0	5	10	14	-4
Qatar	AFC	1982	2019	10	3	4	3	12	13	−1
Romania	UEFA	1974	2003	4	0	1	3	3	12	−9
Russia	UEFA	2002	2002	1	1	0	0	1	0	+1
Saudi Arabia	AFC	1982	2025	19	12	2	6	29	17	+12
Scotland	UEFA	1995	2026	4	2	2	0	3	0	+3
Senegal	CAF	1987	2018	4	0	2	2	4	7	−3
Serbia	UEFA	2010	2021	3	1	0	2	1	5	−4
Singapore	AFC	1959	2015	28	23	2	3	67	21	+46
Slovakia	UEFA	2000	2004	3	2	1	0	5	2	+3
South Africa	CAF	2009	2009	1	0	1	0	0	0	0
South Korea	AFC	1954	2025	79	16	23	40	75	119	−44
Spain	UEFA	2001	2022	2	1	0	1	2	2	0
Sri Lanka	AFC	1972	1993	3	3	0	0	16	0	+16
Sweden	UEFA	1995	2026	4	0	4	0	5	5	0
Switzerland	UEFA	1993	2018	3	1	1	1	5	6	−1
Syria	AFC	1978	2024	13	11	2	0	37	9	+28
Tajikistan	AFC	2011	2021	4	4	0	0	19	1	+18
Thailand	AFC	1960	2024	28	19	6	3	70	23	+47
Togo	CAF	2009	2009	1	1	0	0	5	0	+5
Trinidad and Tobago	CONCACAF	2006	2019	2	1	1	0	2	0	+2
Tunisia	CAF	1996	2026	7	6	0	1	12	3	+9
Turkey	UEFA	1997	2023	3	2	0	1	5	3	+2
Turkmenistan	AFC	2019	2019	1	1	0	0	3	2	+1
Ukraine	UEFA	2002	2018	3	1	0	2	2	3	−1
United Arab Emirates	AFC	1981	2017	20	6	9	5	22	18	+4
United States	CONCACAF	1993	2025	4	2	0	2	7	6	+1
Uruguay	CONMEBOL	1985	2026	10	3	3	4	21	25	−4
Uzbekistan	AFC	1996	2019	11	7	3	1	30	10	+20
Venezuela	CONMEBOL	2010	2026	6	2	3	1	8	7	+1
Vietnam	AFC	2007	2024	6	5	1	0	12	4	+8
Wales	UEFA	1992	1992	1	0	0	1	0	1	−1
Yemen	AFC	2006	2010	4	4	0	0	8	3	+5
Zambia	CAF	2014	2014	1	1	0	0	4	3	+1

== Honours ==
=== Global ===
- FIFA Confederations Cup
  - Runners-up (1): 2001
- Olympic Games
  - Bronze medal (1): 1968

=== Intercontinental ===
- Afro-Asian Cup of Nations
  - Champions (2): 1993, 2007
- AFC–OFC Challenge Cup
  - Champions (1): 2001

=== Continental ===
- AFC Asian Cup
  - Champions (4): 1992, 2000, 2004, 2011
  - Runners-up (1): 2019
- Asian Games^{1}
  - Bronze medal (2): 1951, 1966

=== Regional ===
- Far Eastern Games
  - Gold medal (1): 1930
- EAFF East Asian Cup / EAFF E-1 Football Championship
  - Champions (3): 2013, 2022, 2025
  - Runners-up (5): 2003, 2005, 2008, 2017, 2019
  - Third place (1): 2010

=== Friendly ===
- Kirin Cup: 1991, 1995, 1996, 1997, 2000, 2001, 2004, 2007, 2008, 2009, 2011, 2026
- Dynasty Cup: 1992, 1995, 1998
- Bangabandhu Cup: 1999

=== Awards ===
- FIFA Confederations Cup Fair Play Award: 2001, 2003
- AFC National Team of the Year: 2000, 2004, 2005, 2008, 2010, 2011
- AFC Asian Cup Fair Play Award: 2007, 2019
- EAFF Championship Fair Play Award: 2005
- Japan Professional Sports Grand Prize: 2002

=== Summary ===
Only official honours are included, according to FIFA statutes (competitions organized/recognized by FIFA or an affiliated confederation).

Competition	1st place, gold medalist(s)	2nd place, silver medalist(s)	3rd place, bronze medalist(s)	Total
FIFA Confederations Cup	0	1	0	1
Olympic Games	0	0	1	1
AFC Asian Cup	4	1	0	5
Afro-Asian Cup of Nations	2	0	0	2
AFC–OFC Challenge Cup	1	0	0	1
Total	7	2	1	10

Notes

1. Competition organized by OCA, officially not recognized by FIFA.

== See also ==
National teams
Men's

- Japan national under-23 football team
- Japan national under-20 football team
- Japan national under-17 football team
- Japan national futsal team
- Japan national under-20 futsal team
- Japan national beach soccer team

Women's

- Japan women's national football team
- Japan women's national under-23 football team
- Japan women's national under-20 football team
- Japan women's national under-17 football team

== Notes ==
Achievements
Preceded by 1988 Saudi Arabia	Asian Champions; 1992 (1st title)	Succeeded by 1996 Saudi Arabia
Preceded by 1996 Saudi Arabia	Asian Champions; 2000 (2nd title); 2004 (3rd title)	Succeeded by 2007 Iraq
Preceded by 2007 Iraq	Asian Champions; 2011 (4th title)	Succeeded by 2015 Australia
Awards
Preceded by Saudi Arabia	AFC Men's Team of the Year; 2000	Succeeded by China
Preceded by Iraq	AFC Men's Team of the Year; 2004–2005	Succeeded by Australia
Preceded by Iraq	AFC Men's Team of the Year; 2008	Succeeded by South Korea
Preceded by South Korea	AFC Men's Team of the Year; 2010–2011	Succeeded by South Korea under-23
