= Afro-Asian Cup of Nations =

Intercontinental football competition

- Organiser(s): AFC; CAF
- Founded: 1978
- Abolished: 2007
- Region: Africa; Asia
- Teams: 2
- Last champions: Japan (2nd title)
- Most championships: Japan (2 titles)

The Afro-Asian Cup of Nations, also called the AFC Asia/Africa Challenge Cup, was an intercontinental football competition endorsed by the Confederation of African Football (CAF) and the Asian Football Confederation (AFC), contested between representative nations from these confederations, usually the winners of the Africa Cup of Nations and the winners of the AFC Asian Cup or the Asian Games. All editions were official competitions of CAF and AFC.

== History ==
- The first edition was in 1978. Iran defeated Ghana 3–0 in the first leg, but the second leg was cancelled due to political problems in Iran, and the trophy was not awarded.
- The competition was completed in 1985, 1987, 1991, 1993 and 1995, but the 1989 competition was cancelled.
- The 1997 edition was severely delayed to 1999, while the "true" 1999 edition (between Egypt and Iran) was also cancelled.
- The competition was discontinued following a CAF decision on July 30, 2000, after AFC representatives had supported Germany rather than South Africa in the vote for hosting the 2006 World Cup. The competition was scheduled to be resumed in 2005 with the match Tunisia-Japan, but was then cancelled once again.
- The competition resumed in 2007 under the name "AFC Asia/Africa Challenge Cup". The 2008 edition was scheduled to be played in November 2008 between Iraq and Egypt in the neutral venue of Saudi Arabia, but was eventually cancelled.

== Results and statistics ==
List of Afro-Asian Cup of Nations matches
Year	Team 1	Score	Team 2	Venue	Location	Attendance
~~1978~~	Iran	3–0	Ghana	Aryamehr Stadium	Tehran, Iran	8,000
~~1978~~	Iran	Cancelled (Note: The second leg of the 1978 Afro-Asian Cup of Nations between Ghana and Iran was cancelled due to the Iranian Revolution. In the first leg, Iran beat Ghana 3–0.)	Ghana	Accra Sports Stadium	Accra, Ghana	—N/a
~~1978~~	The trophy was not awarded, because the second leg was cancelled.					
Year	Winners	Score	Runners-up	Venue	Location	Attendance
1985	Cameroon	4–1	Saudi Arabia	Ahmadou Ahidjo Stadium	Yaoundé, Cameroon	80,000
1985	Cameroon	1–2	Saudi Arabia	King Fahd Stadium	Taif, Saudi Arabia	20,000
1985	Cameroon won 5–3 on aggregate.					
1987	South Korea	1–1 (a.e.t.) (4–3 p)	Egypt	Khalifa International Stadium	Doha, Qatar	15,000
1991	Algeria	1–2	Iran	Azadi Stadium	Tehran, Iran	100,000
1991	Algeria	1–0	Iran	Stade du 5 Juillet	Algiers, Algeria	30,000
1991	Aggregate 2–2, Algeria won on away goals.					
1993	Japan	1–0 (a.e.t.)	Ivory Coast	National Stadium	Tokyo, Japan	53,302
1995	Nigeria	3–2	Uzbekistan	Pakhtakor Central Stadium	Tashkent, Uzbekistan	55,000
1995	Nigeria	1–0	Uzbekistan	National Stadium	Lagos, Nigeria	60,000
1995	Nigeria won 4–2 on aggregate.					
1997	South Africa	1–0	Saudi Arabia	Green Point Stadium	Cape Town, South Africa	20,000
1997	South Africa	0–0	Saudi Arabia	King Fahd International Stadium	Riyadh, Saudi Arabia	50,000
1997	South Africa won 1–0 on aggregate.					
2007	Japan	4–1	Egypt	Nagai Stadium	Osaka, Japan	41,901

=== Results by nation ===
Results by nation
Team	Winners	Runners-up
Japan	2 (1993, 2007)	—
Cameroon	1 (1985)	—
South Korea	1 (1987)	—
Algeria	1 (1991)	—
Nigeria	1 (1995)	—
South Africa	1 (1997)	—
Saudi Arabia	—	2 (1985, 1997)
Egypt	—	2 (1987, 2007)
Iran	—	1 (1991)
Ivory Coast	—	1 (1993)
Uzbekistan	—	1 (1995)

=== Results by confederation ===
Results by confederation
Confederation	Winners	Runners-up
CAF	4	3
AFC	3	4

== See also ==
- AFC–OFC Challenge Cup
- Afro-Asian Club Championship
- Finalissima
- Panamerican Championship
