= 1993 Afro-Asian Cup of Nations =

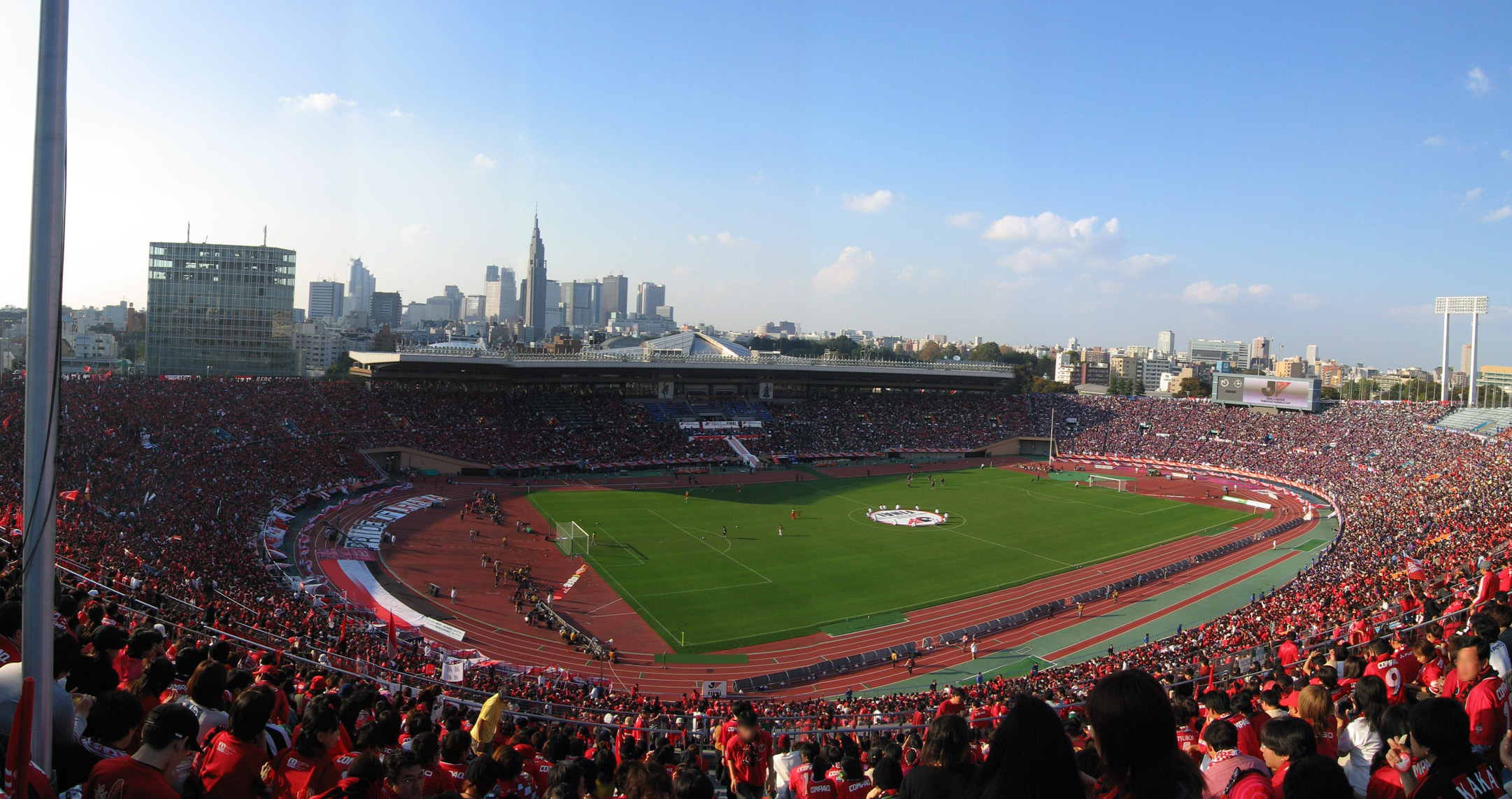
- The old Tokyo National Stadium hosted the final
Japan	Ivory Coast
1	0
- After extra time
- Date: 4 October 1993
- Venue: Tokyo National Stadium, Tokyo
- Referee: Wei Jihong (China)
- Attendance: 53,302

The 1993 Afro-Asian Cup of Nations was the fifth edition of the Afro-Asian Cup of Nations, it was contested between Japan, winners of the 1992 Asian Cup, and Ivory Coast, winners of the 1992 Africa Cup of Nations. The match was played in one leg in Tokyo, Japan.

== Qualified teams ==
Country	Qualified as	Previous appearance in tournament
Ivory Coast	1992 African Cup of Nations champions	Debut
Japan	1992 Asian Cup champions	Debut

== Match details ==
4 October 1993
--:-- UTC+9

Japan	1–0 (a.e.t.)	Ivory Coast
Miura 116'	report

Tokyo National Stadium, Tokyo
Attendance: 53,302
Referee: Wei Jihong (China)

Japan	Ivory Coast

Japan:
GK	–	Shigetatsu Matsunaga
DF	–	Takumi Horiike
DF	–	Tetsuji Hashiratani (c)
DF	–	Masami Ihara	(yellow card) 34'
DF	–	Yasutoshi Miura
MF	–	Hajime Moriyasu
MF	–	Mitsunori Yoshida		(substituted off) 73'
MF	–	Ruy Ramos	(yellow card) 80'
FW	–	Masahiro Fukuda
FW	–	Takuya Takagi
FW	–	Kazuyoshi Miura
Substitutes:
MF	–	Kenta Hasegawa		(substituted on) 73'
Manager:
(Netherlands) Hans Ooft

Ivory Coast:
GK	–	Losseni Konaté
DF	–	Georges Lignon
DF	–	Arsène Hobou
DF	–	Sam Abouo
DF	–	Rufin Lué		(substituted off) 91'
MF	–	Aliou Siby Badra
MF	–	Donald-Olivier Sié
MF	–	Tchiressoua Guel
MF	–	Yaya Doumbia		(substituted off) 59'
FW	10	Abdoulaye Traoré (c)	(yellow card) 7'
FW	–	Ahmed Ouattara	(yellow card) 29'
Substitutes:
MF	–	Célestin Amani		(substituted on) 91'
MF	–	Adama Koné Clofie		(substituted on) 59'
Manager:
Yeo Martial

Assistant referees:
... ... (...)
... ... (...)
Fourth official:
... ... (...)

Man of the Match:
... ... (...)

== Winners ==
Japan won 1–0 after extra time.

1993 Afro-Asian Cup of Nations

Japan
1st title
