= Masujiro Nishida =

Japanese footballer and manager

Masujiro Nishida 西田 満寿次郎
Personal information
- Full name: Masujiro Nishida
- Place of birth: Empire of Japan
- Position: Goalkeeper

Youth career
- Meisei Commercial High School

Senior career*
Years	Team	Apps	(Gls)
- Osaka SC

Managerial career
- 1923: Japan
- * Club domestic league appearances and goals

Masujiro Nishida (西田 満寿次郎, Nishida Masujiro) was a Japanese football player and manager. He managed Japan national team.

== Playing career ==
Nishida played for Osaka SC was founded by his alma mater high school graduates and many Japan national team players were playing in those days.

== Coaching career ==
In 1923, Nishida became manager for Japan national team for 1923 Far Eastern Championship Games in Osaka. At this competition, on May 23, Japan fought against Philippines. This match is Japan team first match in International A Match. He managed 2 matches at this competition, but Japan lost in both matches (1-2, v Philippines and 1-5, v Republic of China).
