= Ryoichi Maeda =

Japanese footballer (born 1981)

Ryoichi Maeda 前田 遼一
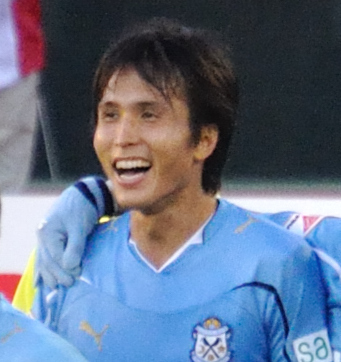
- Maeda in 2010

Personal information
- Date of birth: 9 October 1981 (age 45)
- Place of birth: Kobe, Hyogo, Japan
- Height: 1.83 m (6 ft 0 in)
- Position: Forward

Youth career
- 1997–1999: Gyosei High School

Senior career*
Years	Team	Apps	(Gls)
2000–2014	Júbilo Iwata	363	(154)
2015–2018	FC Tokyo	103	(17)
2017–2018	FC Tokyo U-23	10	(3)
2019–2020	FC Gifu	59	(6)
Total		525	(177)

International career
2000–2001	Japan U-20	12	(5)
2003–2004	Japan U-23	5	(0)
2007–2013	Japan	33	(10)

Managerial career
- 2021–2022: Jubilo Iwata U-18 (Head coach)
- 2023–: Japan (assistant coach)
Medal record
Júbilo Iwata
Winner	J1 League	2002
Runner-up	J1 League	2001
Runner-up	J1 League	2003
Winner	J.League Cup	2010
Runner-up	J.League Cup	2001
Winner	Emperor's Cup	2003
Runner-up	Emperor's Cup	2004
Representing Japan
AFC Asian Cup
Gold medal – first place	2011 Qatar
Asian Games
Silver medal – second place	2002 Busan	Team
AFC U-19 Championship
Silver medal – second place	2000 Iran
- * Club domestic league appearances and goals as of end of 2020 season

Ryoichi Maeda (前田 遼一, Maeda Ryōichi; born 9 October 1981) is a Japanese football coach and former player who played as a forward. He was the J.League Top Scorer and J.League Best XI in 2009 and 2010.

He currently works as an assistant coach for the Japan national team.

== Club career ==
Maeda was born in Kobe, Japan but spent his childhood in the United States. He was educated at and played for Gyosei Junior and Senior High School in Tokyo. While he was a high school student, he was chosen as one of the Designated Players for Development by J.League and JFA. Because of this status, Maeda was able to register as a Verdy Kawasaki player while he was still eligible to play for his high school club. However, he did not play any official match for Verdy.

After graduating from his high school in 2000, he joined Júbilo Iwata. His first appearance as a professional player came on 3 May 2000 in a league match against Kawasaki Frontale. His first professional goal came on 28 August 2001 in a J.League Cup game against JEF United Ichihara. Although he could not play many matches behind Masashi Nakayama and Naohiro Takahara until 2002, he played as regular player from 2003. In the season 2009 was the J.League Top Scorer with twenty goals. In the 2010 season, Maeda became the top scorer again, netting 17 times. Júbilo also won the champions in 2010 J.League Cup. At 2010 J.League Cup Final, he scored two goals and was selected MVP award in the tournament. However Júbilo was relegated to J2 League end of 2013 season. In 2014, although he scored 17 goals, Júbilo finished at the 4th place and missed promotion to J1.

In 2015, Maeda moved to J1 club FC Tokyo. He played as regular player until 2016. However his opportunity to play decreased from 2017 and he could hardly score goals in the match.

In 2019, Maeda moved to J2 club FC Gifu.

=== Curse of Maeda ===
Since the 2007 season, for six straight seasons, each team Maeda scores his first goal of the league campaign against has eventually been relegated to J2 League. This has given rise to the so-called "curse of (Ryoichi) Maeda". It became a topic of wide public conversation in late 2012 as Gamba Osaka, the team that he scored his first goal of that season against, was in the relegation zone despite having not ranked lower than third in the previous three seasons. Consistent with the "curse", Gamba Osaka was relegated to J2 following the last game of the season in which they lost against, funnily enough, Jubilo Iwata 2–1 with Maeda scoring a goal and an assist. The curse came to an end by the end of the 2013 season, as Maeda's first goal of the 2013 season came in a loss to Urawa, who will not be relegated.

== International career ==
Maeda played for Japan U20 at the 2001 FIFA World Youth Championship in Argentina. He also played for Japan U23 at the 2004 Summer Olympics qualification but failed to be picked up to the squad for the finals in Greece.

After impressive performance at club, Maeda made his international debut for Japan in a friendly against Cameroon on 22 August 2007 at Oita Stadium. He scored his first international goal on 17 October 2007 in a friendly against Egypt at Nagai Stadium in Osaka. In 2011, Maeda participated in his first major full international tournament at 2011 AFC Asian Cup in Qatar and started all six games in Japan's Asian Cup winning campaign. He was selected Japan for 2013 FIFA Confederations Cup. He played 33 games and scored 10 goals for Japan until 2013.

== Career statistics ==
=== Club ===
As of end of 2018 season

Appearances and goals by club, season and competition
Club	Season	League			Emperor's Cup		J.League Cup		Asia		Total	
Club	Season	Division	Apps	Goals	Apps	Goals	Apps	Goals	Apps	Goals	Apps	Goals
Júbilo Iwata	2000	J1 League	1	0	3	0	0	0	–		4	0
Júbilo Iwata	2001	J1 League	9	2	2	1	5	1	–		16	4
Júbilo Iwata	2002	J1 League	4	0	3	1	2	0	–		9	1
Júbilo Iwata	2003	J1 League	28	7	5	1	9	5	–		42	13
Júbilo Iwata	2004	J1 League	27	8	5	3	6	1	3	1	41	13
Júbilo Iwata	2005	J1 League	25	12	0	0	2	2	3	0	30	14
Júbilo Iwata	2006	J1 League	27	15	3	2	7	1	–		37	18
Júbilo Iwata	2007	J1 League	22	12	2	1	0	0	–		24	13
Júbilo Iwata	2008	J1 League	22	8	0	0	0	0	–		22	8
Júbilo Iwata	2009	J1 League	34	20	2	1	6	3	–		42	24
Júbilo Iwata	2010	J1 League	33	17	1	0	10	3	–		44	20
Júbilo Iwata	2011	J1 League	28	14	0	0	3	1	–		31	15
Júbilo Iwata	2012	J1 League	33	13	1	1	4	2	–		38	16
Júbilo Iwata	2013	J1 League	33	9	2	1	4	1	–		39	11
Júbilo Iwata	2014	J2 League	37	17	0	0	–		–		37	17
Júbilo Iwata	Total		363	154	29	12	58	20	6	1	456	187
FC Tokyo	2015	J1 League	30	9	2	1	6	0	–		38	10
FC Tokyo	2016	J1 League	29	6	1	0	3	0	8	3	41	9
FC Tokyo	2017	J1 League	26	1	1	0	7	1	–		34	2
FC Tokyo	2018	J1 League	18	1	0	0	1	0	–		19	1
FC Tokyo	Total		103	17	4	1	17	1	8	3	132	22
FC Tokyo U-23	2017	J3 League	2	0	–		–		–		2	0
FC Tokyo U-23	2018	J3 League	8	3	–		–		–		8	3
FC Tokyo U-23	Total		10	3	–		–		–		10	3
Career total			476	174	33	13	75	21	14	4	598	212

=== International ===
Appearances and goals by national team and year
National team	Year	Apps	Goals
Japan	2007	2	1
Japan	2008	1	1
Japan	2009	2	0
Japan	2010	2	0
Japan	2011	9	4
Japan	2012	8	4
Japan	2013	9	0
Total		33	10

Scores and results list Japan's goal tally first, score column indicates score after each Maeda goal.

List of international goals scored by Ryoichi Maeda
No.	Date	Venue	Opponent	Score	Result	Competition
1	17 October 2007	Nagai Stadium, Osaka, Japan	Egypt	3–0	4–1	2007 Afro-Asian Cup of Nations
2	17 February 2008	Olympic Sports Center, Chongqing, China	North Korea	1–1	1–1	East Asian Football Championship 2008
3	17 January 2011	Ahmed bin Ali Stadium, Al Rayyan, Qatar	Saudi Arabia	3–0	5–0	2011 AFC Asian Cup
4	17 January 2011	Ahmed bin Ali Stadium, Al Rayyan, Qatar	Saudi Arabia	4–0	5–0	2011 AFC Asian Cup
5	25 January 2011	Thani bin Jassim Stadium, Al Rayyan, Qatar	South Korea	1–1	2–2	2011 AFC Asian Cup
6	11 November 2011	Pamir Stadium, Dushanbe, Tajikistan	Tajikistan	3–0	4–0	2014 FIFA World Cup qualification
7	24 February 2012	Nagai Stadium, Osaka, Japan	Iceland	1–0	3–1	Friendly
8	3 June 2012	Saitama Stadium 2002, Saitama, Japan	Oman	2–0	3–0	2014 FIFA World Cup qualification
9	8 June 2012	Saitama Stadium 2002, Saitama, Japan	Jordan	1–0	6–0	2014 FIFA World Cup qualification
10	11 September 2012	Saitama Stadium 2002, Saitama, Japan	Iraq	1–0	1–0	2014 FIFA World Cup qualification

== Honours ==
Júbilo Iwata

- J1 League: 2002
- J.League Cup: 2010
- Japanese Super Cup: 2003

Japan

- AFC Asian Cup: 2011
- Afro-Asian Cup of Nations: 2007

Individual

- Asian Young Footballer of the Year: 2000
- J.League Top Scorer: 2009, 2010
- J.League Best XI: 2009, 2010
- J.League Cup MVP: 2010
