= 2010 J.League Cup final =

Júbilo Iwata	Sanfrecce Hiroshima
5	3
- Date: November 3, 2010
- Venue: National Stadium, Tokyo

2010 J.League Cup final was the 18th final of the J.League Cup competition. The final was played at National Stadium in Tokyo on November 3, 2010. Júbilo Iwata won the championship.

== Match details ==
November 3, 2010

Júbilo Iwata	5–3	Sanfrecce Hiroshima
Keisuke Funatani 36'; Ryoichi Maeda 89', 109'; Minoru Suganuma 102'; Ryohei Yamazaki 104'	Report	Tadanari Lee 43'; Satoru Yamagishi 48'; Tomoaki Makino 105+3'

National Stadium

Júbilo Iwata
GK	1	(Japan) Yoshikatsu Kawaguchi
DF	23	(Japan) Kosuke Yamamoto
DF	50	(Japan) Masahiro Koga
DF	13	(South Korea) Lee Gang-jin	(substituted off) 49'
DF	20	(Japan) Shuto Yamamoto
MF	6	(Japan) Daisuke Nasu
MF	27	(Japan) Kota Ueda
MF	11	(Japan) Norihiro Nishi
MF	28	(Japan) Keisuke Funatani	(substituted off) 60'
FW	8	(Brazil) Gilsinho	(substituted off) 77'
FW	18	(Japan) Ryoichi Maeda
Substitutes:
GK	21	(Japan) Naoki Hatta
DF	4	(Japan) Kentaro Oi	(substituted on) 49'
DF	16	(Japan) Jo Kanazawa
MF	3	(Japan) Ryu Okada
MF	15	(Japan) Minoru Suganuma	(substituted on) 60'
MF	10	(Japan) Sho Naruoka
FW	25	(Japan) Ryohei Yamazaki	(substituted on) 77'
Manager:
(Japan) Masaaki Yanagishita

Sanfrecce Hiroshima
GK	21	(Japan) Shusaku Nishikawa
DF	24	(Japan) Ryota Moriwaki
DF	35	(Japan) Koji Nakajima
DF	5	(Japan) Tomoaki Makino
MF	14	(Croatia) Mihael Mikić	(substituted off) 78'
MF	8	(Japan) Kazuyuki Morisaki
MF	7	(Japan) Koji Morisaki	(substituted off) 55'
MF	16	(Japan) Satoru Yamagishi
MF	15	(Japan) Yojiro Takahagi
MF	13	(Japan) Issei Takayanagi	(substituted off) 46'
FW	9	(Japan) Tadanari Lee
Substitutes:
GK	34	(Japan) Hirotsugu Nakabayashi
DF	2	(Bulgaria) Ilian Stoyanov
DF	22	(Japan) Tsubasa Yokotake	(substituted on) 78'
MF	6	(Japan) Toshihiro Aoyama	(substituted on) 56'
MF	28	(Japan) Takuya Marutani
FW	33	(Japan) Masato Yamazaki	(substituted on) 46'
FW	11	(Japan) Hisato Sato
Manager:
(Serbia) Mihailo Petrović

== See also ==
- 2010 J.League Cup
