= 2018 FC Tokyo U-23 season =

FC Tokyo U-23
2018 season
- Manager: Takayoshi Amma
- Stadium: Ajinomoto Field Nishigaoka
- J3 League: 14th

2018 FC Tokyo U-23 season.

== J3 League ==
Match	Date	Team	Score	Team	Venue	Attendance
1	2018.03.11	FC Tokyo U-23	0-3	Azul Claro Numazu	Yumenoshima Stadium	1,527
2	2018.03.16	YSCC Yokohama	3-1	FC Tokyo U-23	NHK Spring Mitsuzawa Football Stadium	671
3	2018.03.21	AC Nagano Parceiro	1-0	FC Tokyo U-23	Nagano U Stadium	3,839
4	2018.03.25	FC Tokyo U-23	3-0	Kataller Toyama	Ajinomoto Field Nishigaoka	1,679
5	2018.04.01	Cerezo Osaka U-23	2-0	FC Tokyo U-23	Kincho Stadium	1,041
7	2018.04.14	FC Tokyo U-23	0-1	Giravanz Kitakyushu	Yumenoshima Stadium	1,075
9	2018.05.03	FC Tokyo U-23	2-0	Grulla Morioka	Ajinomoto Field Nishigaoka	2,114
10	2018.05.06	FC Tokyo U-23	0-0	Gainare Tottori	Ajinomoto Field Nishigaoka	2,364
11	2018.05.20	Thespakusatsu Gunma	4-1	FC Tokyo U-23	Shoda Shoyu Stadium Gunma	3,385
8	2018.05.26	Gamba Osaka U-23	2-4	FC Tokyo U-23	Panasonic Stadium Suita	1,596
12	2018.06.03	FC Tokyo U-23	2-3	Kagoshima United FC	Ajinomoto Field Nishigaoka	2,563
13	2018.06.10	Blaublitz Akita	0-0	FC Tokyo U-23	Akigin Stadium	2,811
14	2018.06.16	FC Tokyo U-23	1-1	FC Ryukyu	Yumenoshima Stadium	2,074
15	2018.06.23	SC Sagamihara	1-0	FC Tokyo U-23	Sagamihara Gion Stadium	2,531
16	2018.06.30	Fujieda MYFC	1-1	FC Tokyo U-23	Fujieda Soccer Stadium	1,064
17	2018.07.07	FC Tokyo U-23	2-3	Fukushima United FC	Yumenoshima Stadium	1,131
18	2018.07.15	FC Tokyo U-23	1-3	Cerezo Osaka U-23	Ajinomoto Field Nishigaoka	1,980
19	2018.07.21	Azul Claro Numazu	2-0	FC Tokyo U-23	Ashitaka Park Stadium	1,673
20	2018.08.25	FC Tokyo U-23	1-2	Thespakusatsu Gunma	Ajinomoto Field Nishigaoka	1,531
21	2018.09.01	Kataller Toyama	0-1	FC Tokyo U-23	Toyama Stadium	2,772
22	2018.09.08	FC Ryukyu	3-2	FC Tokyo U-23	Tapic Kenso Hiyagon Stadium	2,317
23	2018.09.16	FC Tokyo U-23	3-0	SC Sagamihara	Yumenoshima Stadium	934
24	2018.09.22	Gainare Tottori	4-2	FC Tokyo U-23	Tottori Bank Bird Stadium	2,233
25	2018.09.30	FC Tokyo U-23	2-2	Gamba Osaka U-23	Ajinomoto Field Nishigaoka	1,178
26	2018.10.07	Fukushima United FC	0-2	FC Tokyo U-23	Toho Stadium	1,176
27	2018.10.14	FC Tokyo U-23	1-0	Blaublitz Akita	Yumenoshima Stadium	1,431
28	2018.10.21	Giravanz Kitakyushu	0-0	FC Tokyo U-23	Mikuni World Stadium Kitakyushu	3,384
29	2018.10.28	FC Tokyo U-23	2-1	Fujieda MYFC	Ajinomoto Field Nishigaoka	1,620
30	2018.11.03	Grulla Morioka	0-2	FC Tokyo U-23	Iwagin Stadium	1,712
31	2018.11.10	Kagoshima United FC	2-1	FC Tokyo U-23	Shiranami Stadium	3,014
32	2018.11.18	FC Tokyo U-23	1-0	YSCC Yokohama	Yumenoshima Stadium	1,925
33	2018.11.23	FC Tokyo U-23	0-1	AC Nagano Parceiro	Ajinomoto Field Nishigaoka	2,438
