= Nishidai Station =

Nishidai Station is the name of three train stations in Japan:

- Nishidai Station (Hyōgo) (西代駅)
- Nishidai Station (Tochigi) (西田井駅)
- Nishidai Station (Tokyo) (西台駅)
