= List of Urawa Red Diamonds individual award winners =

Awards won by Urawa Red Diamonds players

== Japanese Awards ==
Year	Award	Player	Nationality
1995	J. League Top Scorer	Masahiro Fukuda	Japan
1995	J. League Best Eleven	Masahiro Fukuda	Japan
1995	J. League Best Eleven	Guido Buchwald	Germany
1996	J. League Best Eleven	Masayuki Okano	Japan
1996	J. League Best Eleven	Guido Buchwald	Germany
1998	J. League Rookie of the Year	Shinji Ono	Japan
1998	J. League Best Eleven	Shinji Ono	Japan
2002	J. League Rookie of the Year	Keisuke Tsuboi	Japan
2002	J. League Best Eleven	Emerson	Brazil
2003	J. League Most Valuable Player	Emerson	Brazil
2003	J. League Best Eleven	Keisuke Tsuboi	Japan
2003	J. League Best Eleven	Emerson	Brazil
2004	J. League Top Scorer	Emerson	Brazil
2004	J. League Best Eleven	Makoto Hasebe	Japan
2004	J. League Best Eleven	Marcus Tulio Tanaka	Japan
2004	J. League Best Eleven	Emerson	Brazil
2005	J. League Best Eleven	Marcus Tulio Tanaka	Japan
2006	J. League Most Valuable Player	Marcus Tulio Tanaka	Japan
2006	J. League Top Scorer	Washington	Brazil
2006	J. League Manager of the Year	Guido Buchwald	Germany
2006	J. League Best Eleven	Marcus Tulio Tanaka	Japan
2006	J. League Best Eleven	Keita Suzuki	Japan
2006	J. League Best Eleven	Washington	Brazil

== International Awards ==
Year	Award	Player	Nationality
1995	AFC Player of the Month	Masahiro Fukuda	Japan
1998	AFC Youth Championship Most Valuable Player	Shinji Ono	Japan
1998	Asian Young Player of the Year	Shinji Ono	Japan
1999	FIFA World Youth Championship Best 11	Shinji Ono	Japan
