= 2006 Júbilo Iwata season =

Júbilo Iwata
2006 season
- Manager: Masakuni Yamamoto; Adílson
- Stadium: Yamaha Stadium
- J. League 1: 5th
- Emperor's Cup: Quarterfinals
- J. League Cup: Quarterfinals
- Top goalscorer: Ryoichi Maeda (15)

2006 Júbilo Iwata season

== Competitions ==
Competitions	Position
J. League 1	5th / 18 clubs
Emperor's Cup	Quarterfinals
J. League Cup	Quarterfinals

== Domestic results ==
=== J. League 1 ===
Match	Date	Venue	Opponents	Score
1	2006..			-
2	2006..			-
3	2006..			-
4	2006..			-
5	2006..			-
6	2006..			-
7	2006..			-
8	2006..			-
9	2006..			-
10	2006..			-
11	2006..			-
12	2006..			-
13	2006..			-
14	2006..			-
15	2006..			-
16	2006..			-
17	2006..			-
18	2006..			-
19	2006..			-
20	2006..			-
21	2006..			-
22	2006..			-
23	2006..			-
24	2006..			-
25	2006..			-
26	2006..			-
27	2006..			-
28	2006..			-
29	2006..			-
30	2006..			-
31	2006..			-
32	2006..			-
33	2006..			-
34	2006..			-

=== Emperor's Cup ===
Match	Date	Venue	Opponents	Score
4th Round	2006..			-
5th Round	2006..			-
Quarterfinals	2006..			-

=== J. League Cup ===
Match	Date	Venue	Opponents	Score
GL-D-1	2006..			-
GL-D-2	2006..			-
GL-D-3	2006..			-
GL-D-4	2006..			-
GL-D-5	2006..			-
GL-D-6	2006..			-
Quarterfinals-1	2006..			-
Quarterfinals-2	2006..			-

== Player statistics ==
No.	Pos.	Player	D.o.B. (Age)	Height / Weight	J. League 1		Emperor's Cup		J. League Cup		Total	
No.	Pos.	Player	D.o.B. (Age)	Height / Weight	Apps	Goals	Apps	Goals	Apps	Goals	Apps	Goals
1	GK	Yoshikatsu Kawaguchi	August 15, 1975 (aged 30)	cm / kg	34	0						
2	DF	Hideto Suzuki	October 7, 1974 (aged 31)	cm / kg	27	2						
3	DF	Takayuki Chano	November 23, 1976 (aged 29)	cm / kg	20	1						
4	DF	Kentaro Ohi	May 14, 1984 (aged 21)	cm / kg	8	0						
5	DF	Makoto Tanaka	August 8, 1975 (aged 30)	cm / kg	25	2						
6	MF	Toshihiro Hattori	September 23, 1973 (aged 32)	cm / kg	30	0						
7	MF	Hiroshi Nanami	November 28, 1972 (aged 33)	cm / kg	10	0						
8	MF	Naoya Kikuchi	November 24, 1984 (aged 21)	cm / kg	32	3						
9	FW	Masashi Nakayama	September 23, 1967 (aged 38)	cm / kg	13	1						
10	MF	Sho Naruoka	May 31, 1984 (aged 21)	cm / kg	16	3						
11	MF	Norihiro Nishi	May 9, 1980 (aged 25)	cm / kg	16	4						
13	DF	Shun Morishita	May 11, 1986 (aged 19)	cm / kg	2	0						
14	MF	Shinji Murai	December 1, 1979 (aged 26)	cm / kg	11	1						
15	DF	Yasumasa Nishino	September 14, 1982 (aged 23)	cm / kg	4	0						
16	FW	Tatsuya Okamoto	September 19, 1986 (aged 19)	cm / kg	0	0						
17	MF	Yoshiaki Ota	June 11, 1983 (aged 22)	cm / kg	32	9						
18	FW	Ryoichi Maeda	October 9, 1981 (aged 24)	cm / kg	27	15						
19	FW	Takashi Fujii	April 28, 1986 (aged 19)	cm / kg	2	0						
20	DF	Kim Jin-Kyu	February 16, 1985 (aged 21)	cm / kg	23	3						
21	GK	Yohei Sato	November 22, 1972 (aged 33)	cm / kg	1	0						
22	FW	Robert Cullen	June 7, 1985 (aged 20)	cm / kg	23	5						
23	MF	Takashi Fukunishi	September 1, 1976 (aged 29)	cm / kg	26	7						
24	DF	Kohei Matsushita	July 24, 1985 (aged 20)	cm / kg	0	0						
24	MF	Kosuke Yamamoto	October 29, 1989 (aged 16)	cm / kg	1	0						
25	MF	Fabrício	July 5, 1982 (aged 23)	cm / kg	31	4						
26	MF	Go Nakamura	November 29, 1986 (aged 19)	cm / kg	0	0						
27	MF	Kota Ueda	May 9, 1986 (aged 19)	cm / kg	20	2						
28	MF	Keisuke Funatani	January 7, 1986 (aged 20)	cm / kg	19	4						
29	MF	Toru Morino	May 12, 1987 (aged 18)	cm / kg	0	0						
30	GK	Naoki Hatta	June 24, 1986 (aged 19)	cm / kg	0	0						
31	GK	Kenya Matsui	September 10, 1985 (aged 20)	cm / kg	0	0						
32	GK	Hiromasa Yamamoto	June 5, 1979 (aged 26)	cm / kg	0	0						
33	MF	Yusuke Inuzuka	December 13, 1983 (aged 22)	cm / kg	14	2						

== Other pages ==
- (in Japanese) J. League official site
