= 2017 FC Tokyo U-23 season =

FC Tokyo U-23
2017 season
- Manager: Tadashi Nakamura
- Stadium: Ajinomoto Field Nishigaoka
- J3 League: 11th

2017 FC Tokyo U-23 season.

== J3 League ==
=== League table ===
Pos	Team	Pld	W	D	L	GF	GA	GD	Pts
8	Kataller Toyama	32	13	8	11	37	33	+4	47
9	Giravanz Kitakyushu	32	13	7	12	44	37	+7	46
10	Fukushima United	32	13	4	15	39	43	−4	43
11	FC Tokyo U-23	32	12	7	13	36	47	−11	43
12	SC Sagamihara	32	9	12	11	34	41	−7	39
13	Cerezo Osaka U-23	32	8	11	13	39	43	−4	35
14	YSCC Yokohama	32	8	8	16	41	54	−13	32

Source: 2017 MEIJI YASUDA J3 LEAGUE League table
Rules for classification: 1) Points; 2) Goal difference; 3) Goals scored; 4th) head-to-head results; 5th) disciplinary points; 6th) draw

=== Match details ===
J3 League match details
Match	Date	Team	Score	Team	Venue	Attendance
1	2017.03.12	FC Tokyo U-23	0-2	Kataller Toyama	Yumenoshima Stadium	2,475
2	2017.03.18	Fujieda MYFC	2-1	FC Tokyo U-23	Fujieda Soccer Stadium	1,921
3	2017.03.25	FC Tokyo U-23	1-0	SC Sagamihara	Ajinomoto Field Nishigaoka	2,020
4	2017.04.02	FC Tokyo U-23	1-2	Kagoshima United FC	Yumenoshima Stadium	1,876
5	2017.04.15	Cerezo Osaka U-23	0-1	FC Tokyo U-23	Yanmar Stadium Nagai	1,375
6	2017.04.30	AC Nagano Parceiro	0-0	FC Tokyo U-23	Minami Nagano Sports Park Stadium	5,333
7	2017.05.06	FC Tokyo U-23	0-3	FC Ryukyu	Ajinomoto Field Nishigaoka	2,607
8	2017.05.13	FC Tokyo U-23	0-1	Tochigi SC	Ajinomoto Field Nishigaoka	884
9	2017.05.21	Grulla Morioka	0-0	FC Tokyo U-23	Iwagin Stadium	1,206
10	2017.05.28	Giravanz Kitakyushu	1-0	FC Tokyo U-23	Mikuni World Stadium Kitakyushu	3,864
11	2017.06.03	FC Tokyo U-23	1-0	Gamba Osaka U-23	Ajinomoto Field Nishigaoka	2,129
13	2017.06.18	YSCC Yokohama	0-1	FC Tokyo U-23	NHK Spring Mitsuzawa Football Stadium	894
14	2017.06.25	FC Tokyo U-23	1-6	Azul Claro Numazu	Yumenoshima Stadium	1,735
15	2017.07.01	FC Tokyo U-23	1-1	Blaublitz Akita	Ajinomoto Field Nishigaoka	1,411
16	2017.07.08	Fukushima United FC	2-2	FC Tokyo U-23	Toho Stadium	1,322
17	2017.07.15	Gainare Tottori	0-6	FC Tokyo U-23	Tottori Bank Bird Stadium	1,875
18	2017.07.22	FC Tokyo U-23	1-2	Giravanz Kitakyushu	Ajinomoto Field Nishigaoka	2,122
19	2017.08.19	Kataller Toyama	1-2	FC Tokyo U-23	Toyama Stadium	6,383
20	2017.08.26	FC Tokyo U-23	0-3	YSCC Yokohama	Ajinomoto Field Nishigaoka	868
21	2017.09.02	Azul Claro Numazu	5-0	FC Tokyo U-23	Ashitaka Park Stadium	3,848
23	2017.09.17	FC Tokyo U-23	1-0	AC Nagano Parceiro	Yumenoshima Stadium	1,227
24	2017.09.23	Tochigi SC	4-1	FC Tokyo U-23	Tochigi Green Stadium	6,296
25	2017.10.01	FC Tokyo U-23	3-1	Grulla Morioka	Ajinomoto Field Nishigaoka	1,690
26	2017.10.07	Blaublitz Akita	1-2	FC Tokyo U-23	Akigin Stadium	1,691
27	2017.10.16	FC Tokyo U-23	1-0	Gainare Tottori	Ajinomoto Stadium	1,139
28	2017.10.21	FC Ryukyu	1-1	FC Tokyo U-23	Okinawa Athletic Park Stadium	1,138
29	2017.10.28	FC Tokyo U-23	1-1	Fukushima United FC	Ajinomoto Field Nishigaoka	864
30	2017.11.05	Gamba Osaka U-23	4-3	FC Tokyo U-23	Suita City Football Stadium	1,805
31	2017.11.11	FC Tokyo U-23	2-0	Fujieda MYFC	Yumenoshima Stadium	1,538
32	2017.11.19	SC Sagamihara	0-0	FC Tokyo U-23	Sagamihara Gion Stadium	5,259
33	2017.11.26	Kagoshima United FC	3-0	FC Tokyo U-23	Kagoshima Kamoike Stadium	2,882
34	2017.12.03	FC Tokyo U-23	2-1	Cerezo Osaka U-23	Komazawa Olympic Park Stadium	6,338
