= Shuto Yamamoto =

Japanese footballer

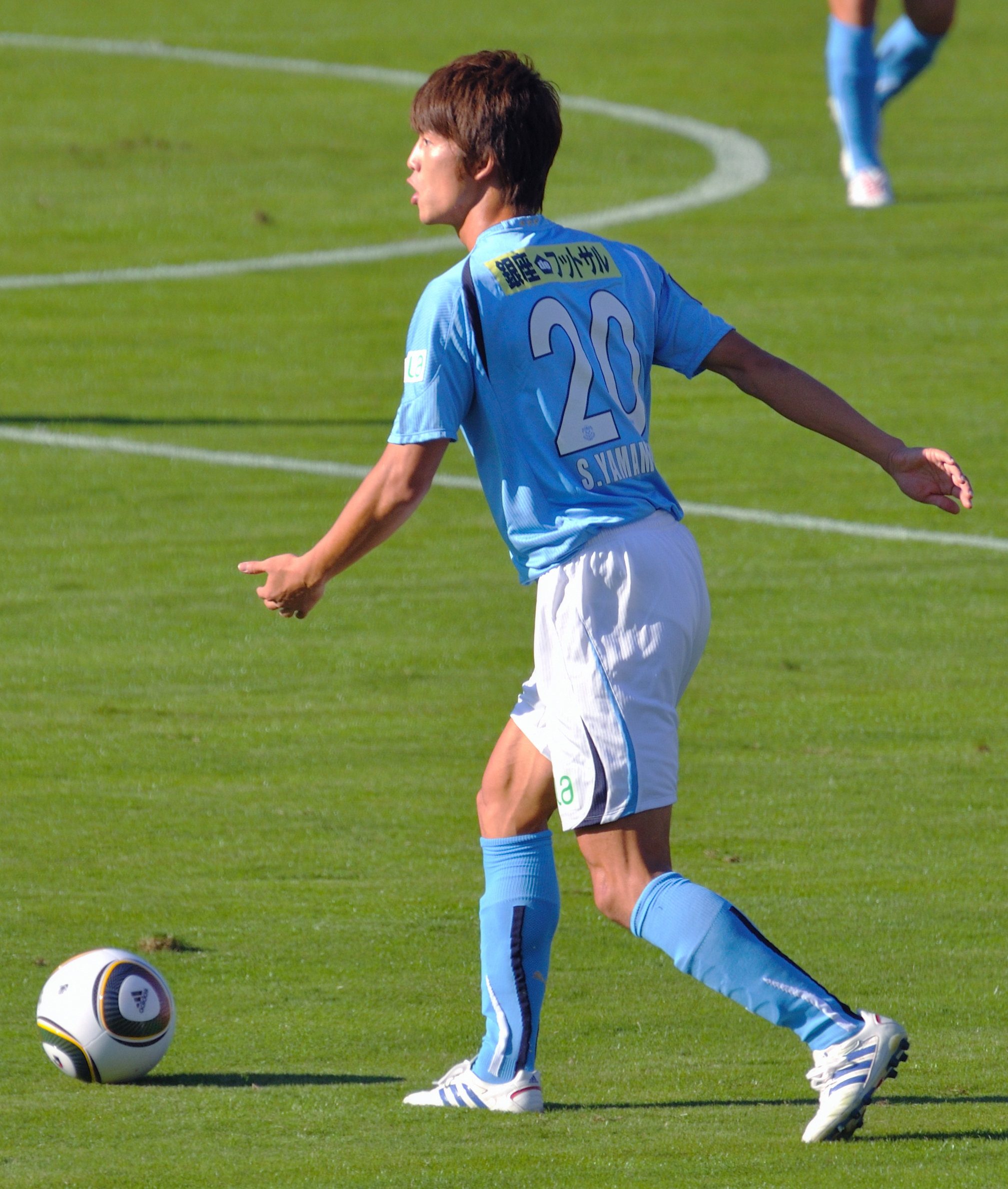
- Yamamoto playing with Júbilo Iwata at the 2010 J.League Cup Final

Personal information
- Full name: Shuto Yamamoto
- Date of birth: June 1, 1985 (age 41)
- Place of birth: Morioka, Japan
- Height: 1.80 m (5 ft 11 in)
- Positions: Full back; centre back

Youth career
- 2001–2003: Morioka Shogyo High School

College career
Years	Team	Apps	(Gls)
2004–2007	Waseda University		

Senior career*
Years	Team	Apps	(Gls)
2008–2013	Júbilo Iwata	88	(3)
2014–2020	Kashima Antlers	154	(9)
2021–2023	Shonan Bellmare	35	(2)
Total		277	(14)

International career
2006	Japan U-21		
2017	Japan	1	(0)
Medal record
Júbilo Iwata
Winner	J.League Cup	2010
Kashima Antlers
Winner	AFC Champions League	2018
Winner	J1 League	2016
Runner-up	J1 League	2017
Winner	J.League Cup	2015
Winner	Emperor's Cup	2016
- * Club domestic league appearances and goals

Shuto Yamamoto (山本 脩斗, Yamamoto Shūto; born June 1, 1985) is a Japanese former professional footballer who played as a full back or centre back. He played for Japanese top-flight clubs Júbilo Iwata, Kashima Antlers and Shonan Bellmare, making almost 400 career appearances in a career spanning 16 years. He has 1 cap for the Japan national football team.

== Post-playing career ==
Following his retirement at the end of the 2023 season, it was announced in January 2024 that Yamamoto would be joining the backroom staff a Kashima Antlers in their scouting department.

== Career statistics ==
=== Club ===
Appearances and goals by club, season and competition
Club	Season	League			National Cup		League Cup		Continental		Other		Total	
Club	Season	Division	Apps	Goals	Apps	Goals	Apps	Goals	Apps	Goals	Apps	Goals	Apps	Goals
Japan			League		Emperor's Cup		J.League Cup		AFC		Other		Total	
Júbilo Iwata	2008	J. League Division 1	4	0	1	0	0	0	–		–		5	0
Júbilo Iwata	2009	J. League Division 1	21	0	0	0	6	0	–		–		27	0
Júbilo Iwata	2010	J. League Division 1	11	0	1	0	5	0	–		–		17	0
Júbilo Iwata	2011	J. League Division 1	28	1	2	0	5	2	–		1 (Note: Appearance in the Suruga Bank Championship)	0	36	3
Júbilo Iwata	2012	J. League Division 1	16	1	2	0	3	0	–		–		21	1
Júbilo Iwata	2013	J. League Division 1	8	1	0	0	3	0	–		–		11	1
Júbilo Iwata	Total		88	3	6	0	22	2	0	0	1	0	117	5
Kashima Antlers	2014	J. League Division 1	32	1	1	0	5	0	–		–		38	1
Kashima Antlers	2015	J1 League	28	3	1	1	5	0	6	0	–		40	4
Kashima Antlers	2016	J1 League	31	3	6	1	3	0	–		8 (Note: 3 appearances in the J.League Championship, 1 appearance in the J.League Cup / Copa Sudamericana Championship and 4 appearances in the 2016 Club World Cup)	0	49	6
Kashima Antlers	2017	J1 League	32	2	2	0	2	0	6	0	1 (Note: Appearance in the Japanese Super Cup)	0	43	2
Kashima Antlers	2018	J1 League	18	0	2	0	3	2	10	1	2 (Note: Appearances in the 2018 Club World Cup)	0	35	3
Kashima Antlers	2019	J1 League	6	0	3	0	0	0	2	1	–		11	1
Kashima Antlers	2020	J1 League	7	0	0	0	1	0	–		–		8	0
Kashima Antlers	Total		154	9	15	2	19	2	24	2	11	0	224	17
Shonan Bellmare	2021	J1 League	8	0	3	0	6	0	–		–		17	0
Shonan Bellmare	2022	J1 League	21	2	0	0	2	0	–		–		23	2
Shonan Bellmare	2023	J1 League	6	0	1	0	4	0	–		–		11	0
Shonan Bellmare	Total		35	2	4	0	12	0	0	0	0	0	51	2
Career total			277	14	25	2	53	4	24	2	12	0	392	24

=== International ===
Japan national team
Year	Apps	Goals
2017	1	0
Total	1	0

== Honors ==
=== Júbilo Iwata ===
- J.League Cup (1): 2010
- Suruga Bank Championship (1): 2011

=== Kashima Antlers ===
- J1 League (1): 2016
- Emperor's Cup (1): 2016
- J.League Cup (1): 2015
- Japanese Super Cup (1): 2017
- AFC Champions League (1): 2018
