= Shimura-sanchome Station =

Metro station in Tokyo, Japan

Coordinates: 35.7775°N 139.6862°E

Shimura-sanchome Station 志村三丁目駅

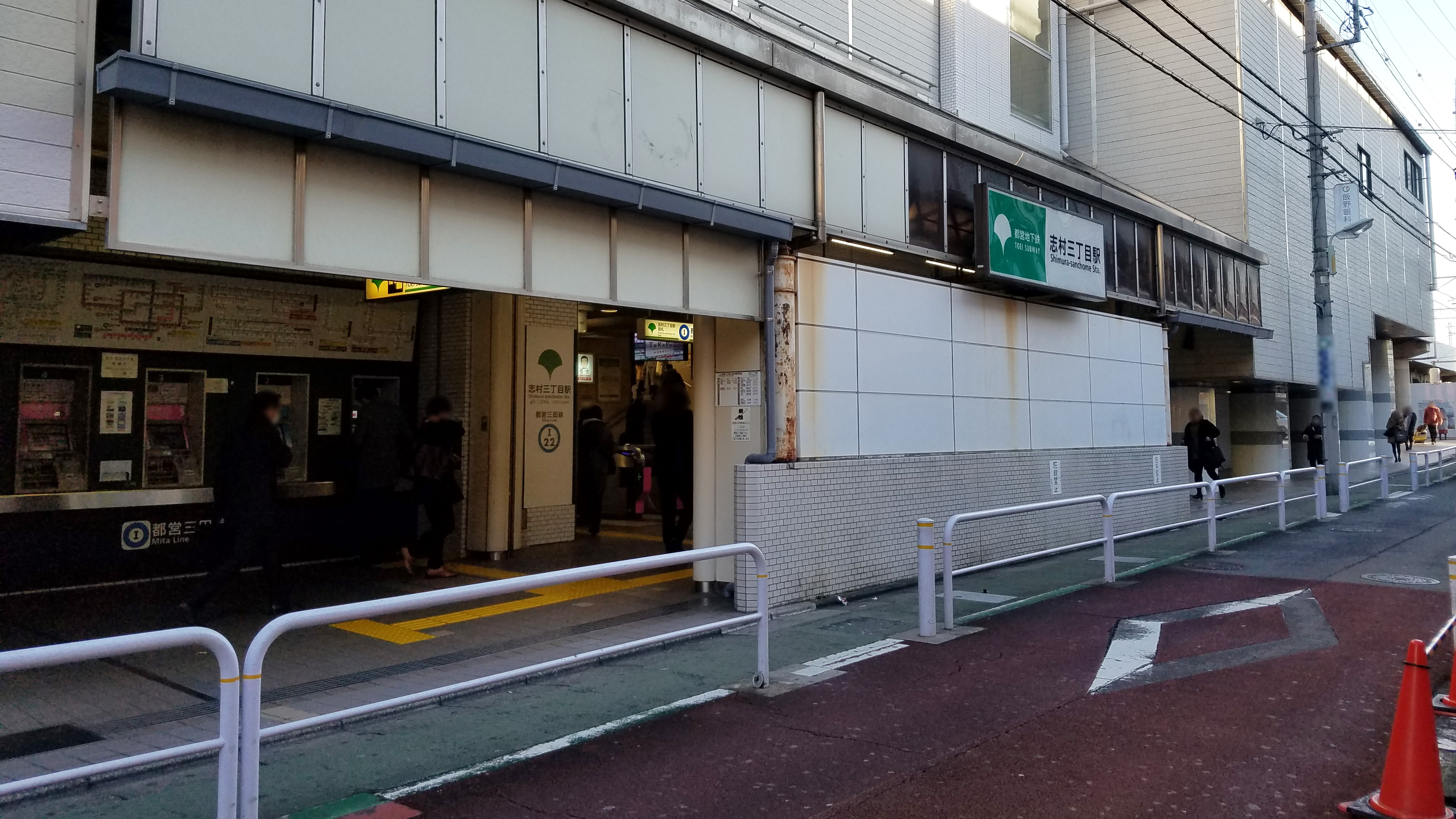
- The entrance of Shimura-sanchome Station, December 2017

General information
- Location: 3-23-1 Shimura, Itabashi City, Tokyo; Japan
- Operator: Toei Subway
- Line: Mita Line
- Platforms: 2 side platforms
- Tracks: 2

Construction
- Structure type: Elevated

Other information
- Station code: I-22

History
- Opened: 27 December 1968; 57 years ago

Services
Preceding station	Toei Subway	Following station
Hasune towards Nishi-takashimadaira	Mita Line	Shimura-sakaue towards Meguro
Location
- Location within Special wards of Tokyo Location within Tokyo Bay and Bōsō Peninsula Location within Tokyo Location within Japan

Shimura-sanchome Station (志村三丁目駅, Shimura-sanchōme-eki) is a metro station on the Toei Mita Line in Itabashi, Tokyo, Japan.

== Lines ==
- Toei Mita Line (I-22)

== Station layout ==
The station consists of two elevated side platforms, located on the second floor. The station ticket gate and exit are located on the first floor.

=== Platforms ===
1
2
Mita Line
Mita Line
- for Sugamo, Ōtemachi, and Meguro
- Meguro Line for Musashi-Kosugi and Hiyoshi
- Sotetsu Main Line for Ebina via the Tokyu/Sotetsu Shin-Yokohama Line
- Sotetsu Izumino Line for Shōnandai via the Tokyu/Sotetsu Shin-Yokohama Line
for Nishi-takashimadaira

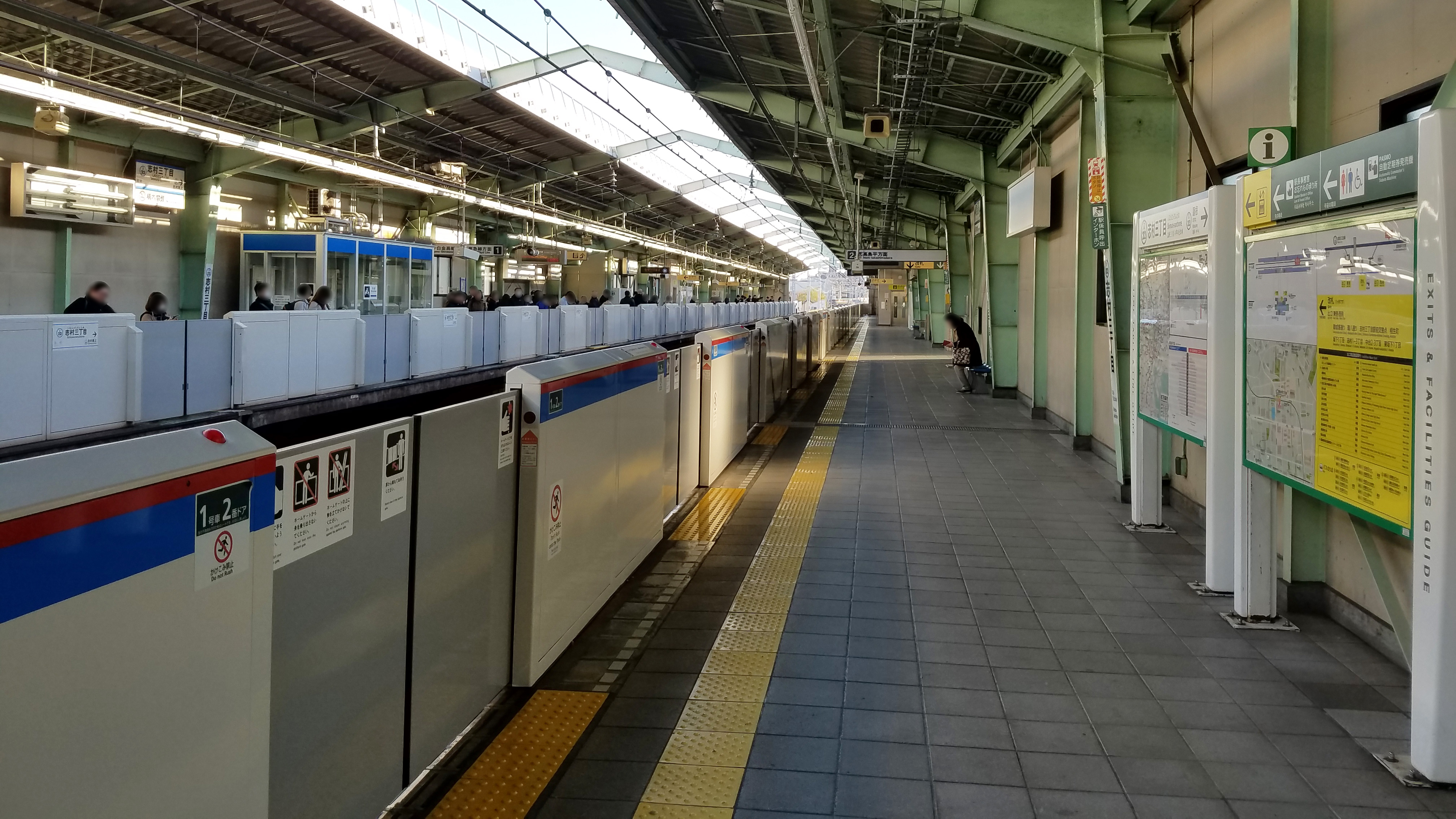
Station platforms, December 2017

== History ==
Shimura-sanchome Station opened on 27 December 1968.

== Surrounding area ==
- Shiroyama Kumano-jinja Shrine
