= Hasune Station =

Metro station in Tokyo, Japan

Coordinates: 35.7842°N 139.6789°E

Hasune Station 蓮根駅

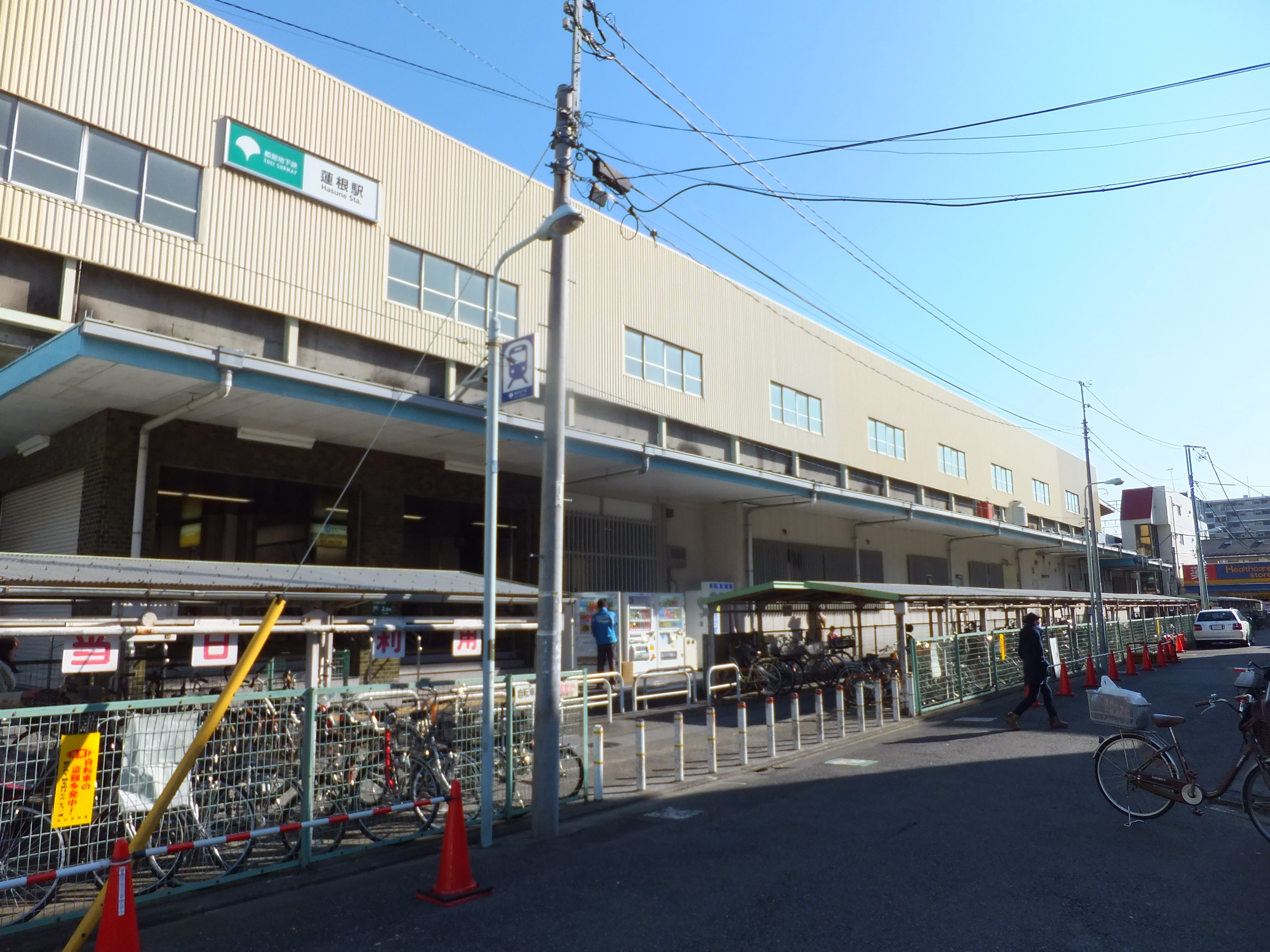
- The station entrance in February 2016

General information
- Location: 2-31-30 Hasune, Itabashi City, Tokyo; Japan
- Operator: Toei Subway
- Line: Mita Line
- Platforms: 1 island platform
- Tracks: 2

Construction
- Structure type: Elevated

Other information
- Station code: I-23

History
- Opened: 27 December 1968; 57 years ago

Services
Preceding station	Toei Subway	Following station
Nishidai towards Nishi-takashimadaira	Mita Line	Shimura-sanchome towards Meguro
Location
- Location within Special wards of Tokyo Location within Tokyo Bay and Bōsō Peninsula Location within Tokyo Location within Japan

Hasune Station (蓮根駅, Hasune-eki) is a railway station on the Toei Mita Line in Itabashi, Tokyo, Japan, operated by Toei Subway.

== Lines ==
Hasune Station is served by the Toei Mita Line, and is numbered "I-23".

== Platforms ==
The station consists of an elevated island platform.

1
2
Mita Line
Mita Line
- for Sugamo, Ōtemachi, and Meguro
- Meguro Line for Musashi-Kosugi and Hiyoshi
- Sotetsu Main Line for Ebina via the Tokyu/Sotetsu Shin-Yokohama Line
- Sotetsu Izumino Line for Shōnandai via the Tokyu/Sotetsu Shin-Yokohama Line
for Nishi-takashimadaira

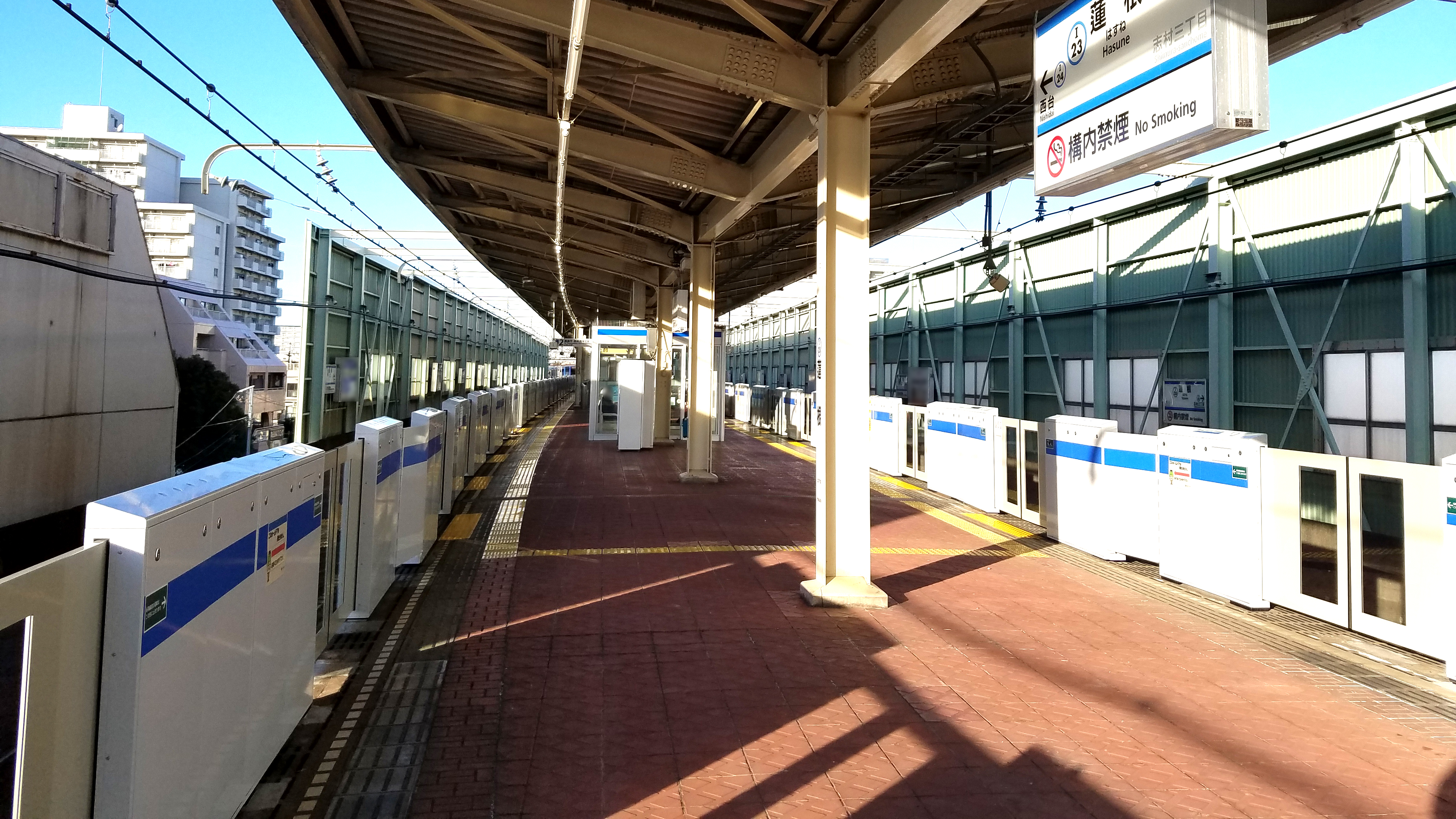
Platforms

== See also ==
- List of railway stations in Japan
