= Shimura Ichirizuka =

- 志村一里塚 (Japanese)
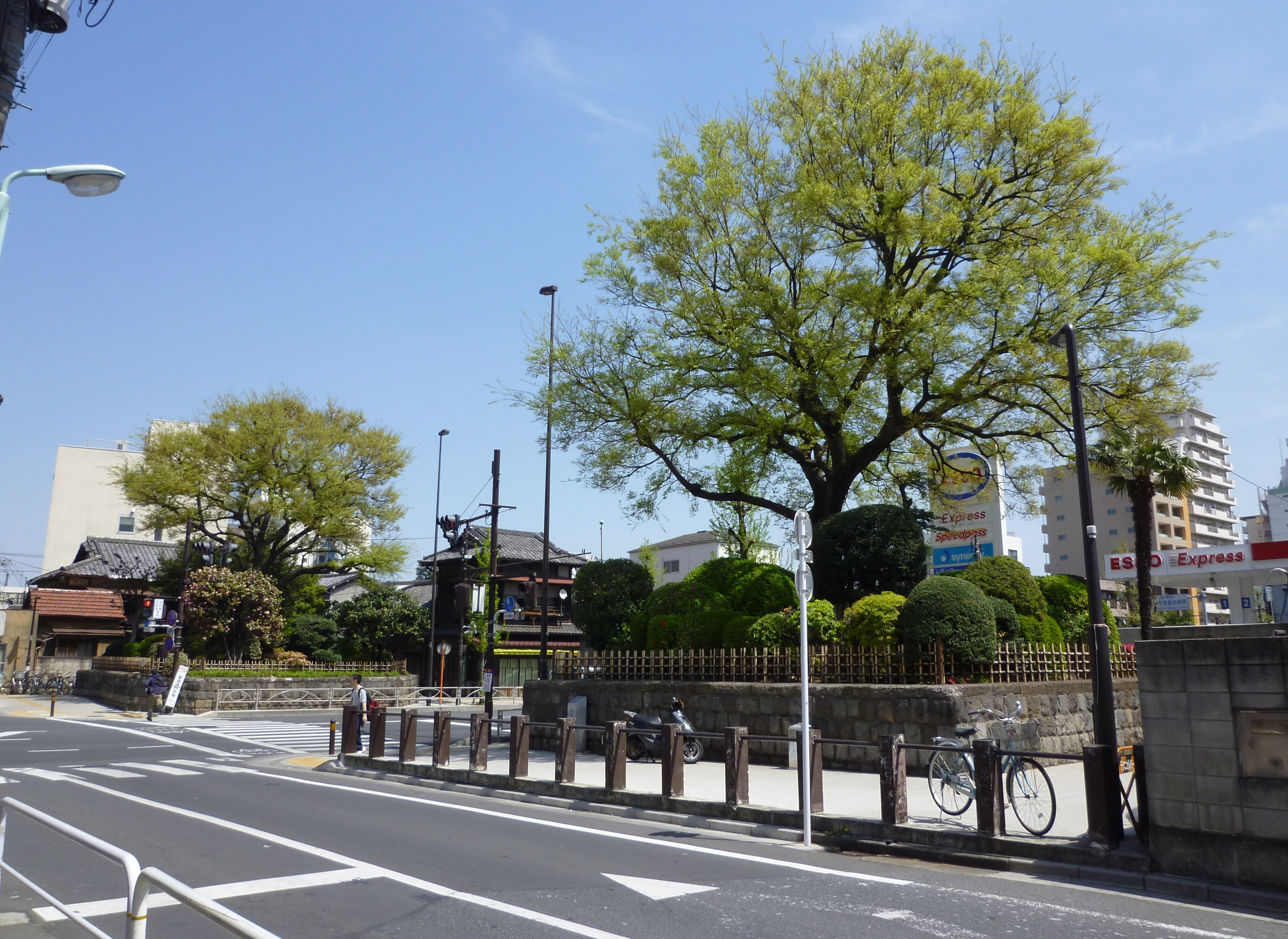
- Shimura Ichirizuka

- Shimura Ichirizuka Shimura Ichirizuka (Japan)
- 35°46′30″N 139°41′45″E
- Periods: Edo period
- Location: Itabashi, Tokyo, Japan
- Region: Kantō region

Site notes
- Owner: National Historic Site
- Public access: Yes

The Shimura Ichirizuka (志村一里塚) is a historic Japanese distance marker akin to a milestone, comprising a pair of earthen mounds located in what is now Itabashi, Tokyo in the Kantō region of Japan. It was designated a National Historic Site of Japan in 1922, with the designation expanded in 1935.

== Overview ==
During the Edo period Tokugawa shogunate established ichirizuka on major roads, enabling calculation both of distance travelled and of the charge for transportation by kago or palanquin. These mounds, denoted the distance in ri (3.927 kilometres (2.440 mi)) to Nihonbashi, the "Bridge of Japan", erected in Edo in 1603. Since the Meiji period, most of the ichirizuka have disappeared, having been destroyed by then elements, modern highway construction and urban encroachment. In 1876, the "Ichirizuka Abolition" decree was issued by the Meiji government and many were demolished at that time. Currently, 17 surviving ichirizuka are designated as national historic sites.

The Shimura ishirizuka were the third on the Nakasendō highway. They are located just outside of Itabashi-juku, the first post station on that route, and were constructed by order of Tokugawa Ieyasu in 1604. The mounds each occupy an area of three by three meters, with a height of one meter, and are planted with enoki trees. The mounds are located on what is now Japan National Route 17. and when the road was widened in 1933, the mounds were preserved by their location, which was slightly wider apart than was the norm. The site is a short walk from Shimura-sakaue Station on the Toei Mita Line.

== See also ==
- List of Historic Sites of Japan (Tōkyō)
