= Shimura-sakaue Station =

Metro station in Tokyo, Japan

Coordinates: 35.7758°N 139.6954°E

Shimura-sakaue Station 志村坂上駅

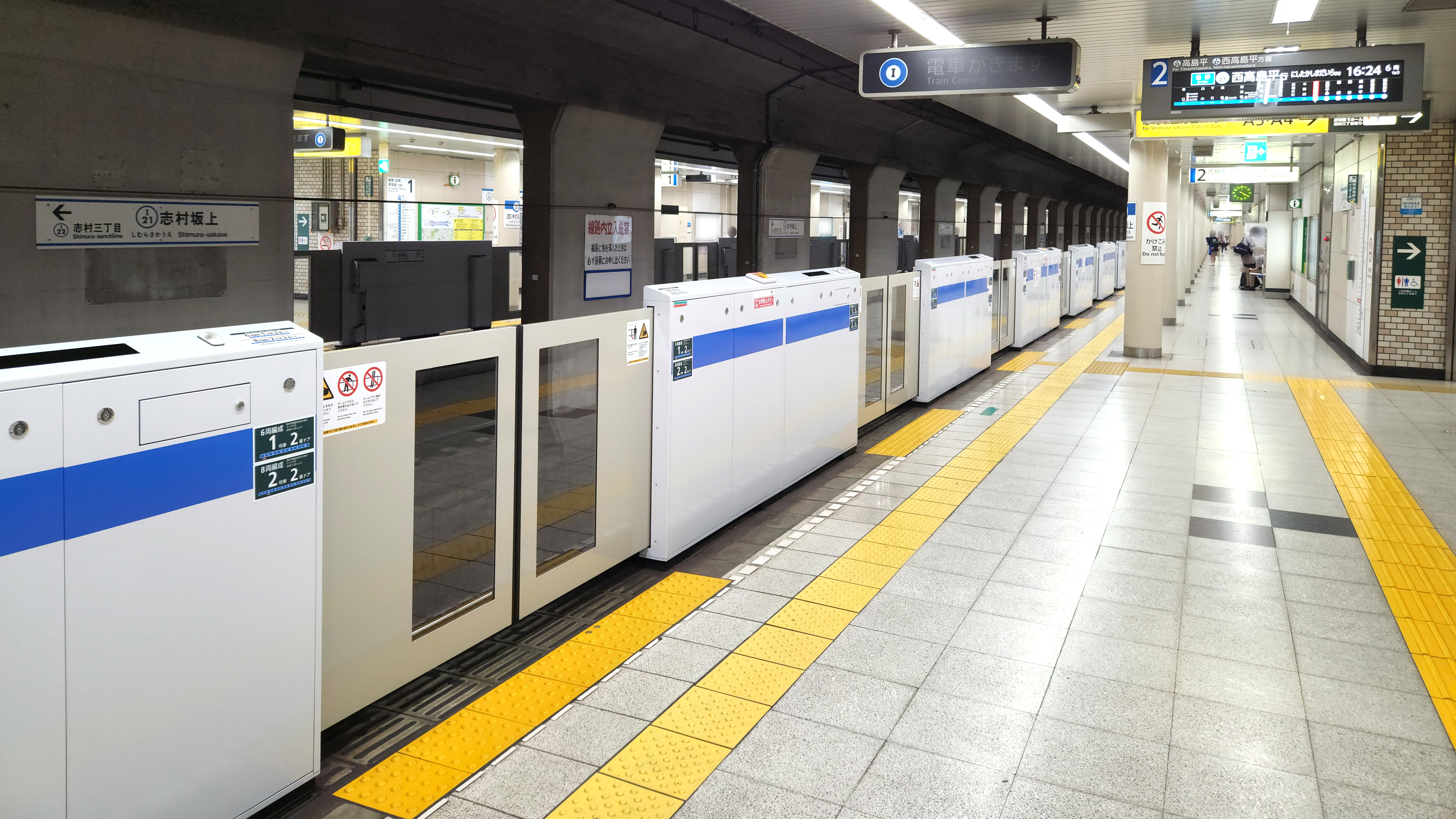
- Platform level of Shimura-sakaue Station in July 2022.

General information
- Location: 1-14-13 Shimura, Itabashi City, Tokyo; Japan
- Operator: Toei Subway
- Line: Mita Line
- Platforms: 2 side platforms
- Tracks: 2

Construction
- Structure type: Underground

Other information
- Station code: I-21

History
- Opened: 27 December 1968; 57 years ago

Services
Preceding station	Toei Subway	Following station
Shimura-sanchōme towards Nishi-takashimadaira	Mita Line	Motohasunuma towards Meguro
Location
- Location within Special wards of Tokyo Location within Tokyo Bay and Bōsō Peninsula Location within Tokyo Location within Japan

Shimura-sakaue Station (志村坂上駅, Shimura-sakaue-eki) is an underground metro station located in the Shimura district of Itabashi City, Tokyo, Japan. It is operated by the Tokyo Metropolitan Bureau of Transportation (Toei Subway) and serves the Toei Mita Line, designated as station code I-21

== Lines ==
- Toei Mita Line (I-21)

== Platforms ==
The station consists of two side platforms. Its platforms and facilities are typical of the Toei Subway system, offering efficient transit connections within Tokyo.

1
2
Mita Line
Mita Line
- for Sugamo, Ōtemachi, and Meguro
- Meguro Line for Musashi-Kosugi and Hiyoshi
- Sotetsu Main Line for Ebina via the Tokyu/Sotetsu Shin-Yokohama Line
- Sotetsu Izumino Line for Shōnandai via the Tokyu/Sotetsu Shin-Yokohama Line
for Nishi-takashimadaira

== History ==
Shimura-sakaue Station opened on 27 December 1968, coinciding with the development of the Toei Mita Line to serve the growing suburban areas of northern Tokyo.

== Surrounding Area ==
The station is situated in a historically significant area. Notably, the Shimura Ichirizuka, an Edo-period distance marker on the old Nakasendo Highway, is just a one-minute walk from the station. This marker highlights the area's historical role as a post station, connecting Edo (now Tokyo) to Kyoto and supporting the prosperity of Itabashi through the flow of travelers and merchants.

The Shimura district is also known for its proximity to other local landmarks, such as Yakushino Izumi Garden
