= J.League Top Scorer =

Japanese football award

The J.League Top Scorer is awarded by the J.League to the top scoring player of the season.

Year	Player	Goals	Club	Nationality
1993	Ramón Díaz	28	Yokohama Marinos	Argentina
1994	Frank Ordenewitz	30	JEF United Ichihara	Germany
1995	Masahiro Fukuda	32	Urawa Red Diamonds	Japan
1996	Kazuyoshi Miura	23	Verdy Kawasaki	Japan
1997	Patrick Mboma	25	Gamba Osaka	Cameroon
1998	Masashi Nakayama	36	Júbilo Iwata	Japan
1999	Hwang Sun-Hong	24	Cerezo Osaka	South Korea
2000	Masashi Nakayama	20	Júbilo Iwata	Japan
2001	Will	24	Consadole Sapporo	Brazil
2002	Naohiro Takahara	26	Júbilo Iwata	Japan
2003	Ueslei	22	Nagoya Grampus Eight	Brazil
2004	Emerson	27	Urawa Red Diamonds	Brazil
2005	Araújo	33	Gamba Osaka	Brazil
2006	Washington	26	Urawa Red Diamonds	Brazil
2006	Magno Alves	26	Gamba Osaka	Brazil
2007	Juninho	22	Kawasaki Frontale	Brazil
2008	Marquinhos	21	Kashima Antlers	Brazil
2009	Ryoichi Maeda	20	Júbilo Iwata	Japan
2010	Ryoichi Maeda	17	Júbilo Iwata	Japan
2010	Joshua Kennedy	17	Nagoya Grampus	Australia
2011	Joshua Kennedy	19	Nagoya Grampus	Australia
2012	Hisato Satō	22	Sanfrecce Hiroshima	Japan
2013	Yoshito Ōkubo	26	Kawasaki Frontale	Japan
2014	Yoshito Ōkubo	18	Kawasaki Frontale	Japan
2015	Yoshito Ōkubo	23	Kawasaki Frontale	Japan
2016	Peter Utaka	19	Sanfrecce Hiroshima	Nigeria
2016	Leandro	19	Vissel Kobe	Brazil
2017	Yū Kobayashi	23	Kawasaki Frontale	Japan
2018	Jô	24	Nagoya Grampus	Brazil
2019	Teruhito Nakagawa	15	Yokohama F. Marinos	Japan
2019	Marcos Júnior	15	Yokohama F. Marinos	Brazil
2020	Michael Olunga	28	Kashiwa Reysol	Kenya
2021	Leandro Damião	23	Kawasaki Frontale	Brazil
2021	Daizen Maeda	23	Yokohama F. Marinos	Japan
2022	Thiago Santana	14	Shimizu S-Pulse	Brazil
2023	Yuya Osako	22	Vissel Kobe	Japan
2023	Anderson Lopes	22	Yokohama F. Marinos	Brazil
2024	Anderson Lopes	24	Yokohama F. Marinos	Brazil
2025	Léo Ceará	21	Kashima Antlers	Brazil
2026	Léo Ceará	10	Kashima Antlers	Brazil

== Wins by club ==
#	Club	Winners
1	Kawasaki Frontale	6
1	Yokohama F. Marinos	6
3	Júbilo Iwata	5
4	Nagoya Grampus	4
5	Gamba Osaka	3
5	Urawa Red Diamonds	3
5	Kashima Antlers	3
8	Sanfrecce Hiroshima	2
8	Vissel Kobe	2
10	Cerezo Osaka	1
10	Consadole Sapporo	1
10	JEF United Chiba	1
10	Kashiwa Reysol	1
10	Shimizu S-Pulse	1
10	Tokyo Verdy	1

== See also ==
- J.League awards
- Japanese football champions, for Japan Soccer League predecessors.
