= Motohasunuma Station =

Metro station in Tokyo, Japan

Coordinates: 35.768782°N 139.702324°E

Motohasunuma Station 本蓮沼駅

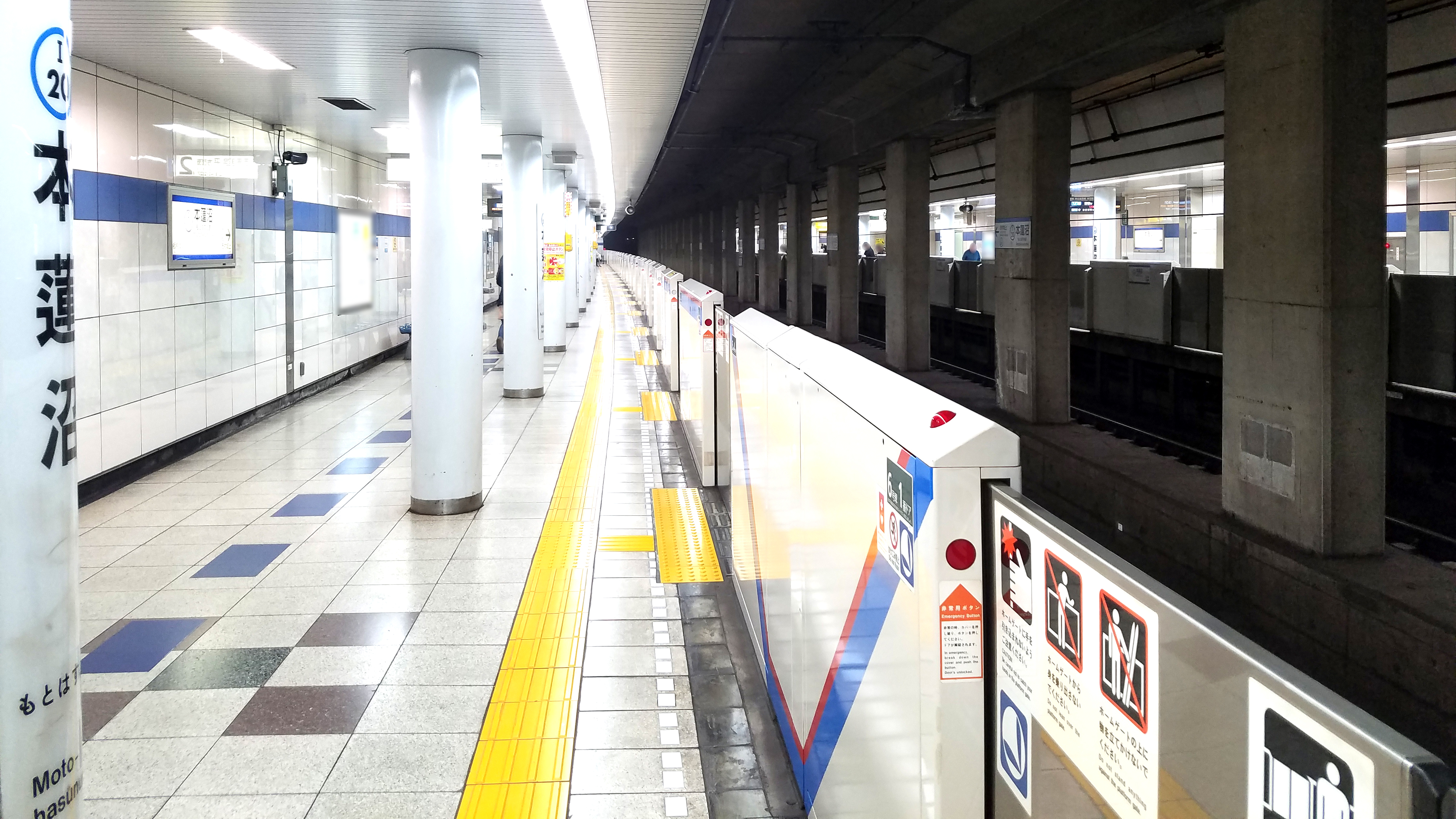
- Platform level of Motohasunuma Station.

General information
- Location: 19-8 Hasunuma-cho, Itabashi City, Tokyo; Japan
- Operator: Toei Subway
- Line: Mita Line
- Platforms: 2 side platforms
- Tracks: 2

Construction
- Structure type: Underground

Other information
- Station code: I-20

History
- Opened: 27 December 1968; 57 years ago

Services
Preceding station	Toei Subway	Following station
Shimura-sakaue towards Nishi-takashimadaira	Mita Line	Itabashi-honchō towards Meguro
Location
- Location within Special wards of Tokyo Location within Tokyo Bay and Bōsō Peninsula Location within Tokyo Location within Japan

Motohasunuma Station (本蓮沼駅, Motohasunuma-eki) is a metro station on the Toei Mita Line in Itabashi, Tokyo, Japan.

== Lines ==
- Toei Mita Line (I-20)

== Platforms ==
The station consists of two side platforms.

1
2
Mita Line
Mita Line
- for Sugamo, Ōtemachi, and Meguro
- Meguro Line for Musashi-Kosugi and Hiyoshi
- Sotetsu Main Line for Ebina via the Tokyu/Sotetsu Shin-Yokohama Line
- Sotetsu Izumino Line for Shōnandai via the Tokyu/Sotetsu Shin-Yokohama Line
for Nishi-takashimadaira

== History ==
The station opened on 27 December 1968.
