= Yumenoshima Stadium =

Stadium in Yumenoshima, Tokyo, Japan

Coordinates: 35°38′55″N 139°49′25″E

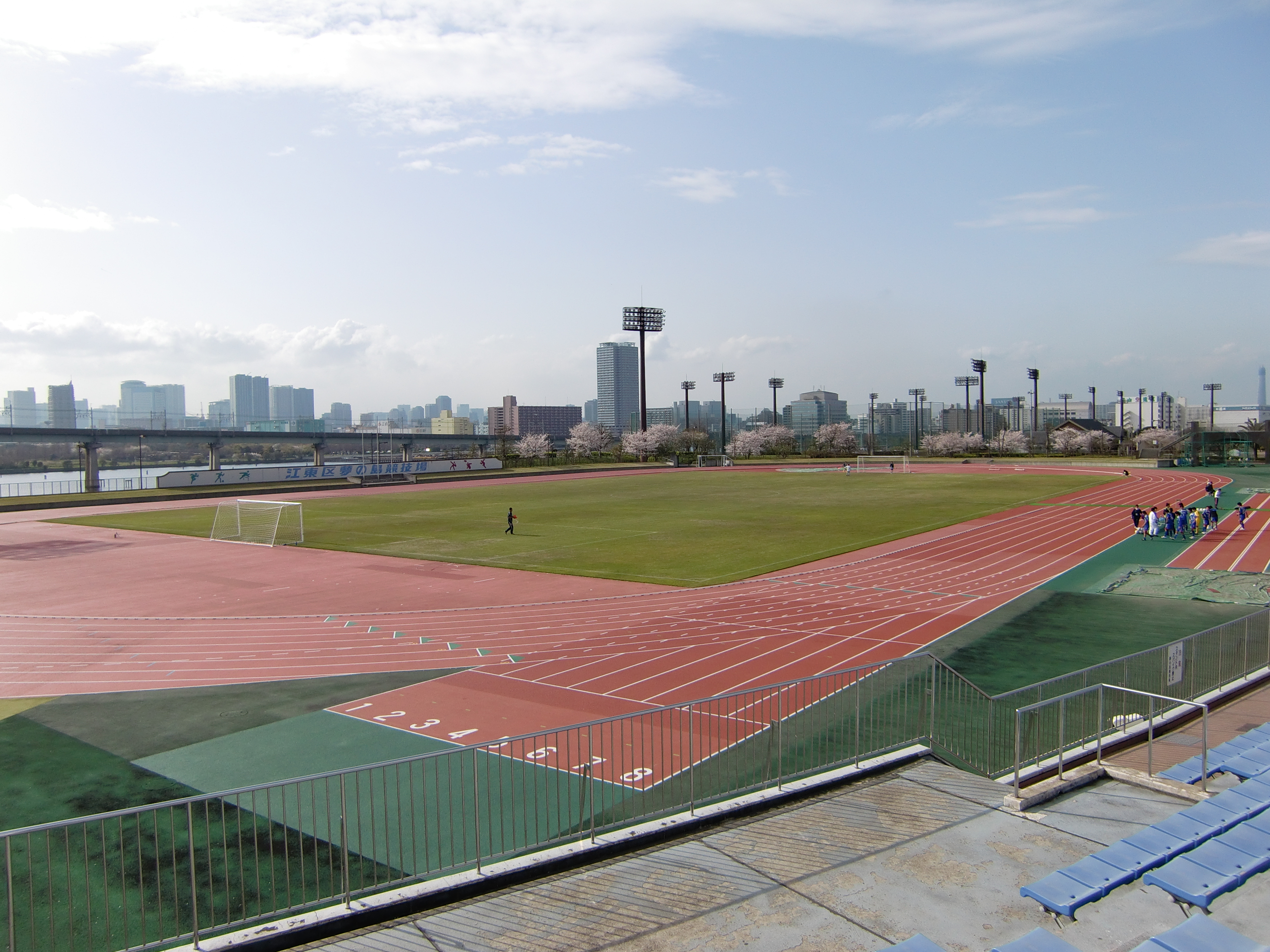
- Interactive map of Yumenoshima Stadium
- Full name: Yumenoshima Athletics Stadium
- Location: Yumenoshima, Tokyo
- Owner: Koto Ward
- Capacity: 5,050

Yumenoshima Stadium (江東区夢の島陸上競技場) is a 5,050-capacity multi-use stadium located in Kōtō, Tokyo on Yumenoshima (夢の島; literally "Dream Island") in Tokyo Bay. The stadium is mostly used for football but also has an athletics track. The seating capacity is 2,350 seats, and the grass stand holds 2,700 people.

The stadium was the main home of Sagawa Express Tokyo SC before that club's merger with its Osaka-based sister club and subsequent relocation to Shiga. It currently serves as the home ground of FC Tokyo U-23 in addition to the Ajinomoto Field Nishigaoka. The stadium hosted the Learning Disabled football championships in 2002.
