= Nishidai Station (Tokyo) =

Metro station in Tokyo, Japan

Coordinates: 35.7872°N 139.6741°E

Nishidai Station 西台駅

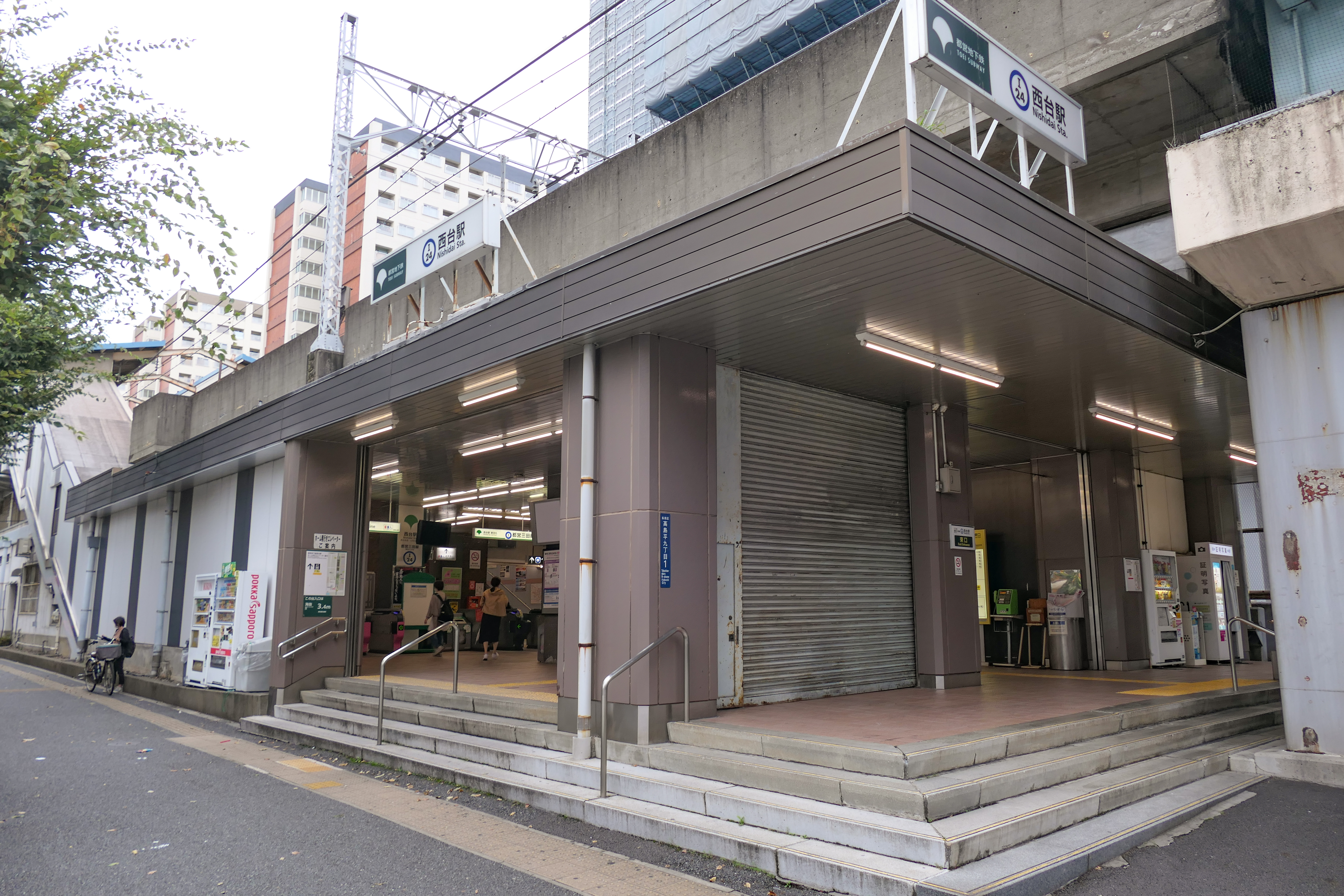
- East exit of Nishidai Station.

General information
- Location: 9-1-1 Takashimadaira, Itabashi City, Tokyo; Japan
- Operator: Toei Subway
- Line: Mita Line
- Platforms: 2 side platforms
- Tracks: 2

Construction
- Structure type: Elevated

Other information
- Station code: I-24

History
- Opened: 27 December 1968; 57 years ago

Services
Preceding station	Toei Subway	Following station
Takashimadaira towards Nishi-takashimadaira	Mita Line	Hasune towards Meguro
Location
- Location within Special wards of Tokyo Location within Tokyo Bay and Bōsō Peninsula Location within Tokyo Location within Japan

Nishidai Station (西台駅, Nishidai-eki) is a railway station on the Toei Mita Line in Itabashi, Tokyo, Japan, operated by Toei Subway.

== Lines ==
- Toei Mita Line (I-24)

== Platforms ==
The station consists of two elevated side platforms.

1
2
Mita Line
Mita Line
- for Sugamo, Ōtemachi, and Meguro
- Meguro Line for Musashi-Kosugi and Hiyoshi
- Sotetsu Main Line for Ebina via the Tokyu/Sotetsu Shin-Yokohama Line
- Sotetsu Izumino Line for Shōnandai via the Tokyu/Sotetsu Shin-Yokohama Line
for Nishi-takashimadaira

== History ==
The station opened on 27 December 1968. In 2004, the original exit was renamed the East Exit and a new West Exit was completed in 2005.
