= 2014 Júbilo Iwata season =

Júbilo Iwata
2014 season
- Manager: Péricles Chamusca; Hiroshi Nanami
- Stadium: Yamaha Stadium
- J2 League: 4th

The 2014 Júbilo Iwata season saw the club compete in the J2 League, the second-tier of Japanese football, in which they finished 4th.

== J2 League ==
=== League table ===
Pos	Team	Pld	W	D	L	GF	GA	GD	Pts	Promotion or relegation
2	Matsumoto Yamaga (P)	42	24	11	7	65	35	+30	83	Qualification for 2015 J1 League
3	JEF United Chiba	42	18	14	10	55	44	+11	68	Qualification for Promotion Playoffs (Note: Only teams that meet J1 license criteria can participate in promotion playoffs. If one or more teams fail to meet the criteria, only eligible teams that finished 3rd to 6th will participate and no replacement teams will be added.)
4	Júbilo Iwata	42	18	13	11	67	55	+12	67	Qualification for Promotion Playoffs
5	Giravanz Kitakyushu	42	18	11	13	50	50	0	65	Ineligible for promotion
6	Montedio Yamagata (P)	42	18	10	14	57	44	+13	64	Qualification for Promotion Playoffs

Updated to match(es) played on 23 November 2014. Source: J.League data
Rules for classification: 1) points; 2) goal difference; 3) number of goals scored.
(P) Promoted

=== Match details ===
J2 League match details
Match	Date	Team	Score	Team	Venue	Attendance
1	2014.03.02	Júbilo Iwata	0-1	Consadole Sapporo	Yamaha Stadium	11,730
2	2014.03.09	Kamatamare Sanuki	1-4	Júbilo Iwata	Kagawa Marugame Stadium	10,421
3	2014.03.16	Júbilo Iwata	3-1	Roasso Kumamoto	Yamaha Stadium	7,998
4	2014.03.22	Júbilo Iwata	3-3	Avispa Fukuoka	Yamaha Stadium	7,912
5	2014.03.30	Tochigi SC	0-2	Júbilo Iwata	Tochigi Green Stadium	6,194
6	2014.04.05	Júbilo Iwata	2-0	Thespakusatsu Gunma	Yamaha Stadium	7,014
7	2014.04.13	Giravanz Kitakyushu	3-2	Júbilo Iwata	Honjo Stadium	3,970
8	2014.04.20	Júbilo Iwata	2-2	Yokohama FC	Yamaha Stadium	9,346
9	2014.04.26	Tokyo Verdy	0-1	Júbilo Iwata	Ajinomoto Stadium	8,170
10	2014.04.29	Júbilo Iwata	2-0	JEF United Chiba	Yamaha Stadium	6,108
11	2014.05.03	Júbilo Iwata	1-0	V-Varen Nagasaki	Yamaha Stadium	9,257
12	2014.05.06	Ehime FC	0-1	Júbilo Iwata	Ningineer Stadium	8,295
13	2014.05.11	Júbilo Iwata	1-1	Oita Trinita	Yamaha Stadium	7,739
14	2014.05.18	Kataller Toyama	0-1	Júbilo Iwata	Toyama Stadium	8,018
15	2014.05.24	Matsumoto Yamaga FC	2-1	Júbilo Iwata	Matsumotodaira Park Stadium	15,597
16	2014.05.31	Júbilo Iwata	1-1	Fagiano Okayama	Yamaha Stadium	8,016
17	2014.06.07	Júbilo Iwata	1-0	Mito HollyHock	Yamaha Stadium	9,172
18	2014.06.14	FC Gifu	0-4	Júbilo Iwata	Gifu Nagaragawa Stadium	15,138
19	2014.06.21	Júbilo Iwata	1-2	Shonan Bellmare	Yamaha Stadium	12,994
20	2014.06.28	Montedio Yamagata	0-1	Júbilo Iwata	ND Soft Stadium Yamagata	12,030
21	2014.07.05	Kyoto Sanga FC	2-3	Júbilo Iwata	Kyoto Nishikyogoku Athletic Stadium	10,573
22	2014.07.20	Júbilo Iwata	1-2	Tokyo Verdy	Yamaha Stadium	9,601
23	2014.07.26	Yokohama FC	4-0	Júbilo Iwata	NHK Spring Mitsuzawa Football Stadium	6,420
24	2014.07.30	Júbilo Iwata	4-2	Kamatamare Sanuki	Yamaha Stadium	7,842
25	2014.08.03	Júbilo Iwata	1-1	Matsumoto Yamaga FC	Yamaha Stadium	13,177
26	2014.08.10	Avispa Fukuoka	3-1	Júbilo Iwata	Level5 Stadium	6,210
27	2014.08.17	Júbilo Iwata	3-2	Kataller Toyama	Yamaha Stadium	8,388
28	2014.08.24	Shonan Bellmare	1-1	Júbilo Iwata	Shonan BMW Stadium Hiratsuka	14,155
29	2014.08.31	Júbilo Iwata	2-3	Tochigi SC	Yamaha Stadium	6,292
30	2014.09.06	Fagiano Okayama	1-1	Júbilo Iwata	Kanko Stadium	12,033
31	2014.09.14	V-Varen Nagasaki	1-1	Júbilo Iwata	Nagasaki Stadium	12,638
32	2014.09.20	Júbilo Iwata	3-1	Giravanz Kitakyushu	Yamaha Stadium	7,440
33	2014.09.23	Mito HollyHock	4-1	Júbilo Iwata	K's denki Stadium Mito	7,033
34	2014.09.28	Júbilo Iwata	2-0	Ehime FC	Yamaha Stadium	8,671
35	2014.10.04	Oita Trinita	2-0	Júbilo Iwata	Oita Bank Dome	7,236
36	2014.10.11	Júbilo Iwata	3-1	FC Gifu	Yamaha Stadium	8,630
37	2014.10.19	Roasso Kumamoto	0-0	Júbilo Iwata	Umakana-Yokana Stadium	12,661
38	2014.10.26	Júbilo Iwata	2-2	Kyoto Sanga FC	Yamaha Stadium	8,218
39	2014.11.01	JEF United Chiba	2-2	Júbilo Iwata	Fukuda Denshi Arena	14,575
40	2014.11.09	Thespakusatsu Gunma	1-1	Júbilo Iwata	Shoda Shoyu Stadium Gunma	5,635
41	2014.11.15	Júbilo Iwata	0-2	Montedio Yamagata	Yamaha Stadium	8,716
42	2014.11.23	Consadole Sapporo	1-1	Júbilo Iwata	Sapporo Dome	19,634
