= 2010 J.League Cup =

J.League Yamazaki Nabisco Cup

Tournament details
- Country: Japan
- Dates: March 31 and November 3

Final positions
- Champions: Júbilo Iwata (2nd title)
- Runners-up: Sanfrecce Hiroshima
- Semifinalists: Shimizu S-Pulse; Kawasaki Frontale

Tournament statistics
- Matches played: 55

The 2010 J. League Cup, more widely known as the 2010 J.League Yamazaki Nabisco Cup, was the 35th edition of the most prestigious Japanese soccer league cup tournament and the 18th edition under the current J. League Cup format. It began on 31 March 2010 with the first matches of the group stage and ended on 3 November 2010 with the Final at National Olympic Stadium, Tokyo.

Teams from the J1 took part in the tournament. Kashima Antlers, Kawasaki Frontale, Sanfrecce Hiroshima and Gamba Osaka were given a bye to the quarter-final due to the qualification for the AFC Champions League group stage. The remaining 14 teams started from the group stage, where they were divided into two groups of seven. The group winners and the runners-up of each group qualified for the quarter-final along with the four teams which qualified for the AFC Champions League.

The competition was won by Júbilo Iwata, who defeated Sanfrecce Hiroshima 5–3 after extra time. They qualified for the 2011 Suruga Bank Championship.

== Group stage ==
=== Group A ===
Team	Pld	W	D	L	GF	GA	GD	Pts
F.C. Tokyo	6	4	1	1	7	4	+3	13
Vegalta Sendai	6	3	3	0	7	1	+6	12
Kyoto Sanga	6	3	2	1	9	5	+4	11
Albirex Niigata	6	3	1	2	5	5	0	10
Omiya Ardija	6	2	1	3	6	9	−3	7
Nagoya Grampus	6	0	3	3	4	9	−5	3
Cerezo Osaka	6	0	1	5	4	9	−5	1

Date	Team 1	Score	Team 2
2010-03-31	Kyoto Sanga	1–1	Omiya Ardija
2010-03-31	F.C. Tokyo	2–2	Nagoya Grampus
2010-03-31	Albirex Niigata	0–0	Vegalta Sendai
2010-04-14	Vegalta Sendai	1–1	Kyoto Sanga
2010-04-14	Omiya Ardija	0–1	F.C. Tokyo
2010-04-14	Cerezo Osaka	0–1	Albirex Niigata
2010-05-22	Nagoya Grampus	1–3	Omiya Ardija
2010-05-22	Kyoto Sanga	2–1	Cerezo Osaka
2010-05-22	F.C. Tokyo	1–0	Albirex Niigata
2010-05-26	Nagoya Grampus	1–1	Cerezo Osaka
2010-05-26	Albirex Niigata	1–4	Kyoto Sanga
2010-05-26	Vegalta Sendai	1–0	F.C. Tokyo
2010-05-29	Cerezo Osaka	0–1	Vegalta Sendai
2010-05-29	Albirex Niigata	1–0	Omiya Ardija
2010-05-30	Kyoto Sanga	1–0	Nagoya Grampus
2010-06-05	Omiya Ardija	2–1	Cerezo Osaka
2010-06-05	Vegalta Sendai	0–0	Nagoya Grampus
2010-06-06	F.C. Tokyo	1–0	Kyoto Sanga
2010-06-09	Cerezo Osaka	1–2	F.C. Tokyo
2010-06-09	Nagoya Grampus	0–2	Albirex Niigata
2010-06-09	Omiya Ardija	0–4	Vegalta Sendai

=== Group B ===
Team	Pld	W	D	L	GF	GA	GD	Pts
Júbilo Iwata	6	4	1	1	12	5	+7	13
Shimizu S-Pulse	6	3	2	1	6	3	+3	11
Montedio Yamagata	6	3	1	2	6	6	0	10
Yokohama F. Marinos	6	2	3	1	6	3	+3	9
Urawa Red Diamonds	6	2	2	2	6	6	0	8
Vissel Kobe	6	2	1	3	8	10	−2	7
Shonan Bellmare	6	0	0	6	4	15	−11	0

Date	Team 1	Score	Team 2
2010-03-31	Shimizu S-Pulse	2–0	Shonan Bellmare
2010-03-31	Urawa Red Diamonds	1–1	Júbilo Iwata
2010-03-31	Yokohama F. Marinos	1–0	Montedio Yamagata
2010-04-14	Montedio Yamagata	0–0	Shimizu S-Pulse
2010-04-14	Vissel Kobe	1–3	Urawa Red Diamonds
2010-04-14	Júbilo Iwata	2–1	Yokohama F. Marinos
2010-05-22	Montedio Yamagata	1–0	Vissel Kobe
2010-05-22	Shonan Bellmare	1–2	Urawa Red Diamonds
2010-05-22	Shimizu S-Pulse	0–0	Yokohama F. Marinos
2010-05-26	Urawa Red Diamonds	0–2	Montedio Yamagata
2010-05-26	Shonan Bellmare	1–2	Júbilo Iwata
2010-05-26	Vissel Kobe	3–1	Shimizu S-Pulse
2010-05-29	Júbilo Iwata	2–0	Vissel Kobe
2010-05-29	Yokohama F. Marinos	3–0	Shonan Bellmare
2010-05-30	Urawa Red Diamonds	0–1	Shimizu S-Pulse
2010-06-05	Vissel Kobe	1–1	Yokohama F. Marinos
2010-06-05	Montedio Yamagata	3–0	Shonan Bellmare
2010-06-06	Shimizu S-Pulse	2–0	Júbilo Iwata
2010-06-09	Júbilo Iwata	5–0	Montedio Yamagata
2010-06-09	Shonan Bellmare	2–3	Vissel Kobe
2010-06-09	Yokohama F. Marinos	0–0	Urawa Red Diamonds

== Knockout stage ==
All times are Japan Standard Time (UTC+9)

Quarterfinals
Kawasaki Frontale	1	3	4
Kashima Antlers	2	1	3
Vegalta Sendai	1	0	1
Júbilo Iwata	2	0	2
Gamba Osaka	1	1	2
Sanfrecce Hiroshima (a)	0	2	2
F.C. Tokyo	1	0	1
Shimizu S-Pulse (a)	1	0	1

Semifinals
Kawasaki Frontale	1	1	2
Júbilo Iwata	3	0	3
Sanfrecce Hiroshima	2	1	3
Shimizu S-Pulse	1	1	2

Finals
Júbilo Iwata (a.e.t.)
Sanfrecce Hiroshima

=== Quarterfinals ===
==== First leg ====
1 September 2010
19:00

Kashima Antlers	2–1	Kawasaki Frontale
Marquinhos 31'; Koroki 55'		Kurotsu 68'

Kashima Soccer Stadium, Kashima
Attendance: 6,977
Referee: Ryuji Sato

1 September 2010
19:00

Júbilo Iwata	2–1	Vegalta Sendai
Gilsinho 32'; Nishi 34'		Ota 76'

Yamaha Stadium, Iwata
Attendance: 5,032
Referee: Kenji Ogiya

1 September 2010
19:00

Sanfrecce Hiroshima	0–1	Gamba Osaka
		Lucas 66'

Hiroshima Big Arch, Hiroshima
Attendance: 6,731
Referee: Masayoshi Okada

1 September 2010
19:00

F.C. Tokyo	1–1	Shimizu S-Pulse
Morishige 79'		Okazaki 68'

Ajinomoto Stadium, Chōfu
Attendance: 12,510
Referee: Hiroyoshi Takayama

==== Second leg ====
8 September 2010
19:00

Kawasaki Frontale	3–1	Kashima Antlers
Tasaka 32'; Nakamura 79'; Vitor Junior 88'		Ogasawara 33'

Todoroki Athletics Stadium, Kawasaki
Attendance: 9,406
Referee: Toshimitsu Yoshida

Kawasaki Frontale won 4-3 on aggregate.

8 September 2010
19:00

Vegalta Sendai	0–0	Júbilo Iwata

Yurtec Stadium Sendai, Sendai
Attendance: 7,317
Referee: Masayoshi Okada

Júbilo Iwata won 2-1 on aggregate.

8 September 2010
19:00

Gamba Osaka	1–2	Sanfrecce Hiroshima
Dodo 82'		Sato 26'; Morisaki 56'

Osaka Expo '70 Stadium, Suita
Attendance: 6,498
Referee: Minoru Tojo

Sanfrecce Hiroshima won by away goals rule (2-2 on aggregate).

8 September 2010
19:00

Shimizu S-Pulse	0–0	F.C. Tokyo

Outsourcing Stadium Nihondaira, Shizuoka
Attendance: 5,683
Referee: Matsuo Hajime

Shimizu S-Pulse won by away goals rule (1-1 on aggregate).

=== Semifinals ===
==== First leg ====
29 September 2010
19:00

Júbilo Iwata	0–1	Kawasaki Frontale
		Kurotsu 55'

Yamaha Stadium, Iwata
Attendance: 10,353
Referee: Yuichi Nishimura

29 September 2010
19:01

Sanfrecce Hiroshima	2–1	Shimizu S-Pulse
Lee 55'; Takahagi 68'		Edamura 76'

Hiroshima Big Arch Stadium, Hiroshima
Attendance: 5,034
Referee: Joji Kashihara

==== Second leg ====
10 October 2010
15:00

Kawasaki Frontale	1–3	Júbilo Iwata
Juninho 38'		Oi 35'; Yamazaki 78'; Naruoka 88'

Todoroki Athletics Stadium, Kawasaki
Attendance: 13,417
Referee: Nobutsugu Murakami

Júbilo Iwata won 3-2 on aggregate.

10 October 2010
15:00

Shimizu S-Pulse	1–1	Sanfrecce Hiroshima
Ono 87'		Yamagishi 64'

Outsourcing Stadium Nihondaira, Shizuoka
Attendance: 12,384
Referee: Kenji Ogiya

Sanfrecce Hiroshima won 3-2 on aggregate.

=== Final ===
3 November 2010
14:09

Júbilo Iwata	5–3 (a.e.t.)	Sanfrecce Hiroshima
Funatani 36'; Maeda 89', 109'; Suganuma 102'; Yamazaki 104'		Lee 43'; Yamagishi 48'; Makino 105+3'

Tokyo National Stadium, Tokyo
Attendance: 39,767
Referee: Hiroyoshi Takayama

== Top goalscorers ==
Goalscorers	Goals	Team
(Brazil) Gilsinho	5	Júbilo Iwata
(Japan) Yuzo Tashiro	3	Montedio Yamagata
(Brazil) Diego	3	Kyoto Sanga
(Japan) Atsushi Yanagisawa	3	Kyoto Sanga
(Brazil) Popó	3	Vissel Kobe
