= Sho Naruoka =

Japanese footballer

Sho Naruoka 成岡 翔
Personal information
- Full name: Sho Naruoka
- Date of birth: May 31, 1984 (age 42)
- Place of birth: Shimada, Shizuoka, Japan
- Height: 1.75 m (5 ft 9 in)
- Position: Midfielder

Youth career
- 2000–2002: Fujieda Higashi High School

Senior career*
Years	Team	Apps	(Gls)
2003–2010	Júbilo Iwata	163	(22)
2011–2012	Avispa Fukuoka	64	(9)
2013–2017	Albirex Niigata	113	(10)
2018	SC Sagamihara	11	(0)
2019	Fujieda MYFC	1	(0)

International career
2001	Japan U-17	3	(0)
2003	Japan U-20	5	(0)
Medal record
Júbilo Iwata
Runner-up	J1 League	2003
Winner	J.League Cup	2010
Winner	Emperor's Cup	2003
Runner-up	Emperor's Cup	2004
Representing Japan
AFC U-19 Championship
Silver medal – second place	2002 Qatar
- * Club domestic league appearances and goals as of 23 February 2020

Sho Naruoka (成岡 翔, Naruoka Shō; born May 31, 1984) is a Japanese former football player who last played for Fujieda MYFC.

== Club career ==
Naruoka played for Júbilo Iwata from 2003 to 2010 and joined Albirex Niigata in January 2013.

He played in the same team as Japan National Team captain Makoto Hasebe while at Fujieda Higashi High School.

Naruoka retired in December 2019.

== National team career ==
In September 2001, Naruoka was selected Japan U-17 national team for 2001 U-17 World Championship. He played all 3 matches. In November 2003, he was also selected Japan U-20 national team for 2003 World Youth Championship. He played all 5 matches.

== Club statistics ==
Updated to 23 February 2020.

Club	Season	J.League		Emperor's Cup		J.League Cup		Continental		Total	
Club	Season	Apps	Goals	Apps	Goals	Apps	Goals	Apps	Goals	Apps	Goals
Júbilo Iwata	2003	12	0	4	2	5	1	–		21	3
Júbilo Iwata	2004	20	1	1	0	6	1	5	2	32	4
Júbilo Iwata	2005	18	2	3	1	1	0	3	0	25	3
Júbilo Iwata	2006	16	3	0	0	8	1	–		24	4
Júbilo Iwata	2007	30	8	2	1	4	0	–		36	9
Júbilo Iwata	2008	15	2	2	0	6	0	–		23	2
Júbilo Iwata	2009	19	3	3	0	4	0	–		26	3
Júbilo Iwata	2010	33	3	2	0	9	2	–		44	5
Avispa Fukuoka	2011	27	3	2	0	1	0	–		30	3
Avispa Fukuoka	2012	37	6	1	0	–		–		38	6
Albirex Niigata	2013	34	4	0	0	4	0	–		38	4
Albirex Niigata	2014	23	3	2	1	3	0	–		28	4
Albirex Niigata	2015	26	1	1	0	6	0	–		33	1
Albirex Niigata	2016	18	2	2	1	4	0	–		24	3
Albirex Niigata	2017	12	0	1	0	3	0	–		16	0
SC Sagamihara	2018	11	0	–		–		–		11	0
Fujieda MYFC	2019	1	0	–		–		–		1	0
Career total		352	41	26	6	64	5	8	2	450	54
