= Ajinomoto Field Nishigaoka =

Stadium in Kita, Tokyo, Japan

Coordinates: 35°46′9″N 139°42′28″E

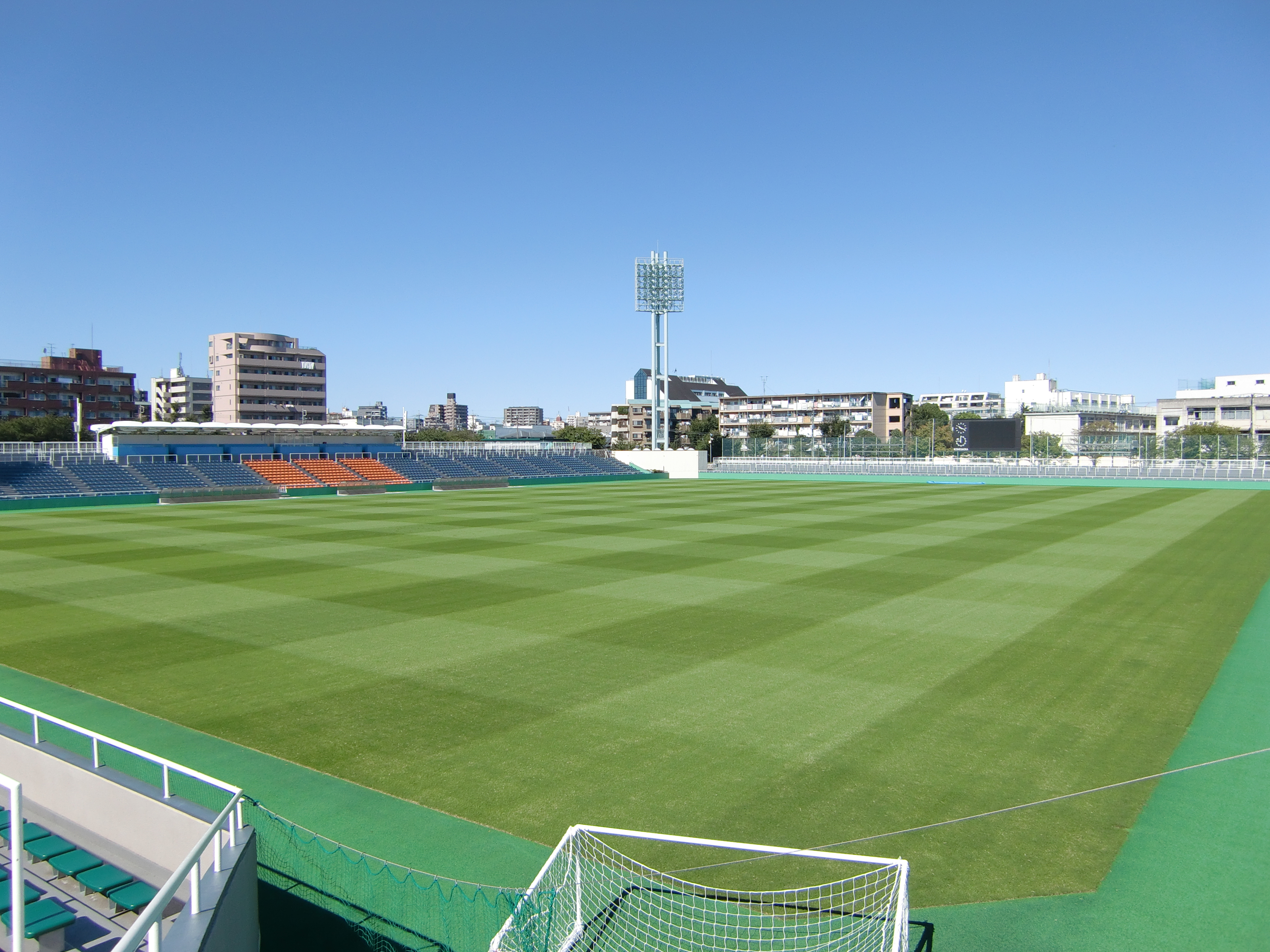
- Interactive map of Ajinomoto Field Nishigaoka
- Former names: Nishigaoka Soccer Stadium (1977–2012)
- Location: Kita, Tokyo
- Owner: Japan Sports Council
- Capacity: 7,258
- Public transit: Toei Subway: Mita Line at Motohasunuma

Construction
- Built: 1969
- Opened: 1972

Tenants
- FC Tokyo U-23 (2016-2020), Japan women's national football team (selected matches)

Ajinomoto Field Nishigaoka (味の素フィールド西が丘), originally called Nishigaoka Soccer Stadium (国立西が丘サッカー場, Nishigaoka National Soccer Stadium), is a football stadium in Kita, Tokyo. It was renamed on 1 May 2012 after the naming rights by Ajinomoto expired after five years.

The stadium is named for Japan Institute of Sports Sciences, which administers it and is not actually the national stadium; that role is taken by the Tokyo National Stadium in Shinjuku.

The Ajinomoto Field Nishigaoka currently has a capacity of 7,137 and was the home stadium of former J3 League club FC Tokyo U-23, until its dissolution.

Also, some matches hosted at the stadium involve Japanese youth national teams and Tokyo Verdy's matches.

== Transportation ==
Access to the stadium is from Motohasunuma Station on the Toei Mita Line.
