= 2023 Emperor's Cup =

103rd edition of the Emperor's Cup

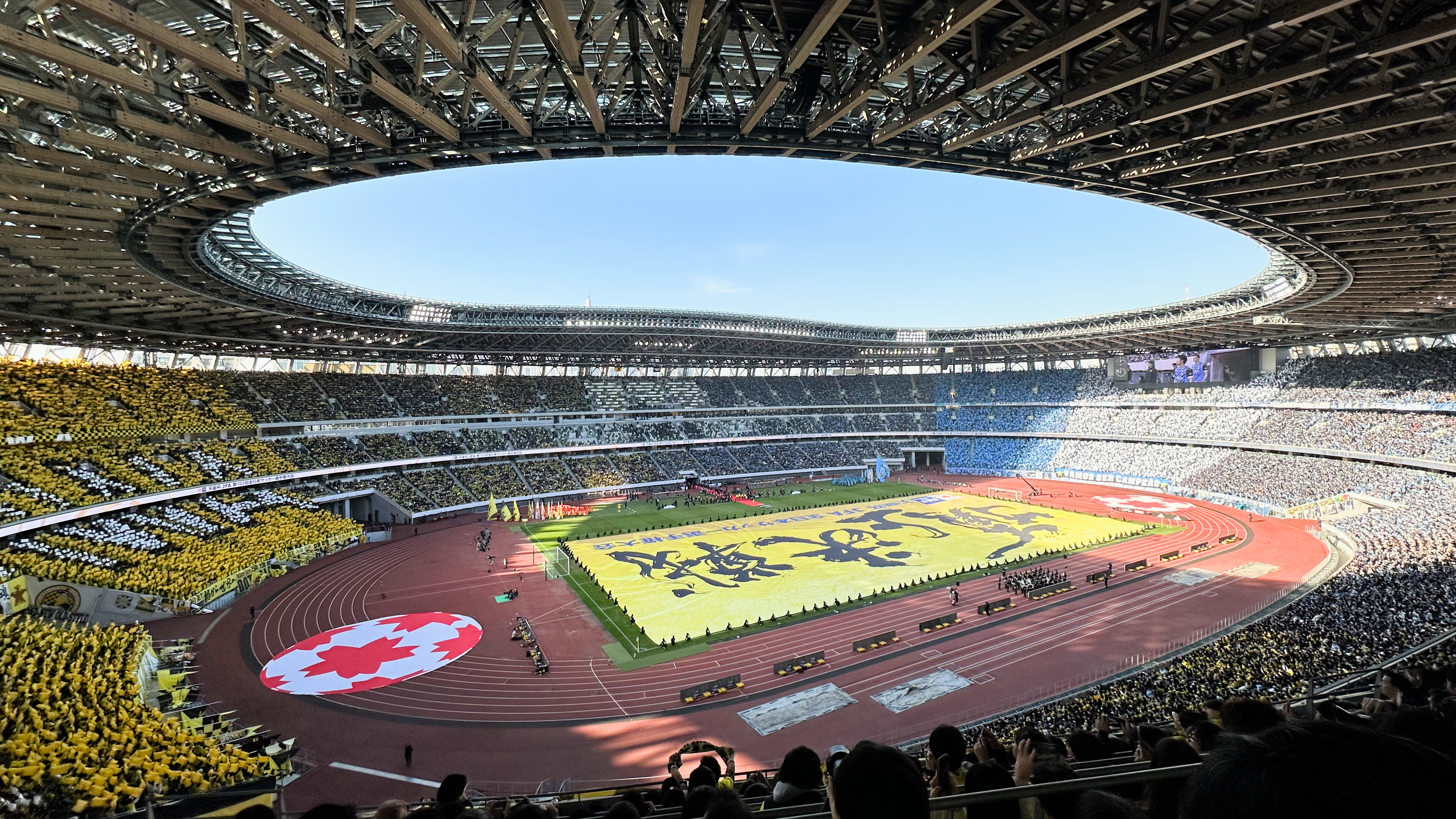
- 2023 Emperor's Cup final at Japan National Stadium

Tournament details
- Country: Japan
- Dates: 20 May – 9 December
- Teams: 88

Final positions
- Champions: Kawasaki Frontale (2nd title)
- Runners-up: Kashiwa Reysol
- Champions League Elite: Kawasaki Frontale

Tournament statistics
- Matches played: 87
- Goals scored: 286 (3.29 per match)
- Attendance: 344,191 (3,956 per match)
- Top goal scorer(s): Hidetaka Maie; Akito Suzuki (5 goals)

The 2023 Emperor's Cup (Emperor's Cup JFA 103rd Japan Football Championship (Japanese: 天皇杯 JFA 第103回全日本サッカー選手権大会)) was the 103rd edition of the annually contested cup, starting on 20 May. The format for 2023 did not present any changes from the previous edition. It featured 88 teams representing the prefectural football associations, J1 League, J2 League and Japan Football League. JFL's Honda FC was once again chosen to be the annually specially designated amateur club.

Ventforet Kofu were the defending champions, after a cinderella story for the J2 club saw them qualify for the final, which they won on penalties against Sanfrecce Hiroshima, after a 1–1 draw in regulation time, but were eliminated by Vissel Kobe in the round of 16.

== Qualifying rounds ==
As only J1 and J2 League clubs qualify directly for the first round, teams from outside of it who want to qualify to the Emperor's Cup (exception being made to the JFA-seeded team), had to, as usual, undergo a prefectural qualification, with regulations and schedules varying from one association to another. In total, there are 47 prefectural cup qualifications, with the winners of each prefectural cup having earned their right to play in the Emperor's Cup, with all of them assigned to start the competition in the first round.

5 May Hokkaido Final	BTOP Hokkaido	1–0	Hokkaido Tokachi Sky Earth	Sapporo
13:00 JST				Stadium: Sapporo Soccer Amusement Park

16 April Akita Final	North Asia University	4–1	TDK Shinwakai	Akita
10:00 JST				Stadium: Space Project Dream Field

7 May Iwate Final	Iwate Grulla Morioka	7–1	Ganju Iwate	Morioka
14:00 JST				Stadium: Iwagin Stadium

7 May Aomori Final	Vanraure Hachinohe	2–0	Blancdieu Hirosaki	Hachinohe
13:00 JST				Stadium: Prifoods Stadium

7 May Miyagi Final	Sony Sendai	3–1	Sendai University	Rifu
13:00 JST				Stadium: Miyagi Co-op Megumino Soccer Field A Ground

23 April Yamagata Final	Yamagata University Faculty of Medicine	3–1	Yamagata University	Yamagata
11:00 JST				Stadium: Yamagata City Athletic Stadium

7 May Fukushima Final	Fukushima United	7–0	Higashi Nippon International University	Fukushima
13:00 JST				Stadium: Toho Stadium

7 May Fukui Final	Fukui United	4–0	Sakai Phoenix	Fukui
13:00 JST				Stadium: Technoport Fukui Stadium

7 May Nagano Final	Nagano Parceiro	1–1 (a.e.t.) (5–4 p)	Matsumoto Yamaga	Nagano
14:00 JST				Stadium: Sunpro Alwin

7 May Toyama Final	Kataller Toyama	0–0 (a.e.t.) (4–2 p)	Toyama Shinjo	Toyama
13:00 JST				Stadium: Toyama Athletic Recreation Park

7 May Niigata Final	Niigata University HW	3–2	Niigata University HW FC	Shibata
15:00 JST				Stadium: Izimino Park Athletic Stadium

7 May Ishikawa Final	Hokuriku University	2–0	Kanazawa Gakuin University	Kanazawa
13:00 JST				Stadium: Kanazawa Soccer Stadium

7 May Gunma Final	Tonan Maebashi	2–0	Thespakusatsu Challengers	Maebashi
10:00 JST				Stadium: Earth Care Gunma Shikishima Football Stadium

7 May Ibaraki Final	University of Tsukuba	2–0	Ryutsu Keizai Dragons Ryugasaki	Hitachinaka
13:00 JST				Stadium: Hitachinaka City Stadium

7 May Tochigi Final	Tochigi City	8–0	Sakushin Gakuin University	Utsunomiya
13:00 JST				Stadium: Tochigi Green Stadium

7 May Yamanashi Final	Yamanashi Gakuin University Pegasus	3–1	USC Nanaho	Kofu
13:00 JST				Stadium: JIT Recycle Ink Stadium

23 April Chiba Final	Briobecca Urayasu	2–1	Juntendo University	Narashino
13:00 JST				Stadium: Frontier Soccer Field

7 May Tokyo Final	Criacao Shinjuku	1–0	Meiji University	Kita
14:00 JST				Stadium: Ajinomoto Field Nishigaoka

22 April Saitama Final	Tokyo International University FC	1–0	Josai University	Sakado
13:00 JST				Stadium: Tokyo International University 1st Soccer Field

7 May Kanagawa Final	SC Sagamihara	2–0	YSCC Yokohama	Yokohama
13:00 JST				Stadium: Nippatsu Mitsuzawa Football Stadium

7 May Mie Final	Veertien Mie	7–0	Suzuka Point Getters	Suzuka
13:05 JST				Stadium: Mie Suzuka Sports Garden

6 May Gifu Final	FC Gifu	11–0	Gifu Shotoku Gakuen University	Gifu
13:00 JST				Stadium: Gifu Nagaragawa Meadow

6 May Aichi Final	Maruyasu Okazaki	3–0	Chukyo University	Nagoya
13:00 JST				Stadium: CS Asset Minato Soccer Stadium

7 May Shizuoka Final	Azul Claro Numazu	3–0	Tokoha University	Numazu
13:00 JST				Stadium: Ashitaka Park Stadium

7 May Nara Final	Nara Club	1–0	Asuka FC	Kashihara
13:05 JST				Stadium: Kashihara Park Athletics Stadium

7 May Hyogo Final	Cento Cuore Harima	3–2	Kwansei Gakuin University	Sumoto
14:00 JST				Stadium: ASPA Goshikidai Sports Park

7 May Shiga Final	Reilac Shiga	2–1	Lagend Shiga	Higashiomi
13:00 JST				Stadium: Nunobiki Green Stadium

5 May Wakayama Final	Arterivo Wakayama	5–1	Wakayama Kihoku Shukyudan	Wakayama
13:00 JST				Stadium: Kimiidera Athletic Stadium

6 May Kyoto Final	Laranja Kyoto	0–0 (a.e.t.) (5–4 p)	Doshisha University	Kameoka
13:00 JST				Stadium: Sanga Stadium by Kyocera

7 May Osaka Final	Kansai University	2–0	FC Osaka	Sakai
13:00 JST				Stadium: J-Green Sakai

23 April Okayama Final	Mitsubishi Mizushima	1–1 (a.e.t.) (8–7 p)	NTN Okayama	Okayama
13:00 JST				Stadium: City Light Stadium

23 April Shimane Final	Belugarosso Iwami	7–0	Hikawa Cosmos	Masuda
13:30 JST				Stadium: Shimane Soccer Field

23 April Tottori Final	Gainare Tottori	6–1	Yonago Genki	Tottori
12:00 JST				Stadium: Axis Bird Stadium

23 April Hiroshima Final	SRC Hiroshima	1–1 (a.e.t.) (5–4 p)	Fukuyama City	Hiroshima
13:00 JST				Stadium: Edion Stadium Hiroshima

23 April Yamaguchi Final	Baleine Shimonoseki	2–0	Shunan University	Shimonoseki
10:30 JST				Stadium: Nogihama Park

7 May Ehime Final	FC Imabari	1–0	Ehime FC	Matsuyama
19:00 JST				Stadium: Ningineer Stadium

7 May Kochi Final	Kochi United	2–0	Kochi University	Kochi
13:00 JST				Stadium: Kochi Haruno Athletic Stadium

7 May Kagawa Final	Kamatamare Sanuki	8–0	Tadotsu FC	Takamatsu
13:00 JST				Stadium: Kagawa Athletic Park

7 May Tokushima Final	FC Tokushima	3–0	Yellow Monkeys	Naruto
14:00 JST				Stadium: Pocarisweat Stadium

23 April Fukuoka Final	Giravanz Kitakyushu	1–0	Fukuoka University	Fukuoka
13:00 JST				Stadium: Best Denki Stadium

7 May Kumamoto Final	Tokai University Kumamoto	2–1	FCK Marry Gold Kumamoto	Kashima
10:00 JST				Stadium: Kumamoto Football Center Cosmos

7 May Oita Final	Verspah Oita	2–2 (a.e.t.) (6–5 p)	J-Lease FC	Oita
11:00 JST				Stadium: Resonac Dome Oita

7 May Saga Final	Brew Kashima	2–1	Saga University	Tosu
11:00 JST				Stadium: Ekimae Real Estate Stadium

6 May Nagasaki Final	Mitsubishi Nagasaki SC	0–0 (a.e.t.) (4–3 p)	MD Nagasaki	Isahaya
13:00 JST				Stadium: Transcosmos Stadium Nagasaki

7 May Miyazaki Final	Tegevajaro Miyazaki	1–0	Minebea Mitsumi	Miyazaki
13:00 JST				Stadium: Miyazaki Ikimenomori Sports Park Athletic Stadium

7 May Kagoshima Final	Kagoshima United	1–0	NIFS Kanoya	Kagoshima
13:00 JST				Stadium: Shiranami Stadium

7 May Okinawa Final	FC Ryukyu	2–0	Okinawa SV	Okinawa
13:00 JST				Stadium: Tapic Kenso Hiyagon Stadium

== Participating clubs ==
=== J1 League ===
All 18 teams playing in the 2023 J1 League entered in the second round.

Club	Apps.	Prefecture
Hokkaido Consadole Sapporo	42nd	Hokkaido
Kashima Antlers	39th	Ibaraki
Urawa Red Diamonds	58th	Saitama
Kashiwa Reysol	55th	Chiba
FC Tokyo	29th	Tokyo
Kawasaki Frontale	40th	Kanagawa
Yokohama F. Marinos	45th	Kanagawa
Yokohama FC	24th	Kanagawa
Shonan Bellmare	51st	Kanagawa

Club	Apps.	Prefecture
Albirex Niigata	31st	Niigata
Nagoya Grampus	46th	Aichi
Kyoto Sanga	40th	Kyoto
Gamba Osaka	43rd	Osaka
Cerezo Osaka	54th	Osaka
Vissel Kobe	36th	Hyogo
Sanfrecce Hiroshima	71st	Hiroshima
Avispa Fukuoka	31st	Fukuoka
Sagan Tosu	31st	Saga

=== J2 League ===
All 22 teams playing in the 2023 J2 League entered in the second round.

Club	Apps.	Prefecture
Vegalta Sendai	29th	Miyagi
Blaublitz Akita	30th	Akita
Montedio Yamagata	31st	Yamagata
Iwaki FC	6th	Fukushima
Mito HollyHock	27th	Ibaraki
Tochigi SC	23rd	Tochigi
Thespakusatsu Gunma	20th	Gunma
Omiya Ardija	28th	Saitama
JEF United Chiba	58th	Chiba
Tokyo Verdy	48th	Tokyo
Machida Zelvia	11th	Tokyo

Club	Apps.	Prefecture
Zweigen Kanazawa	19th	Ishikawa
Ventforet Kofu	31st	Yamanashi
Shimizu S-Pulse	31st	Shizuoka
Júbilo Iwata	46th	Shizuoka
Fujieda MYFC	5th	Shizuoka
Fagiano Okayama	15th	Okayama
Renofa Yamaguchi	19th	Yamaguchi
Tokushima Vortis	35th	Tokushima
V-Varen Nagasaki	16th	Nagasaki
Roasso Kumamoto	23rd	Kumamoto
Oita Trinita	27th	Oita

=== Amateur designated team ===
One team selected from the Japan Football League. It entered in the first round.

Club	Apps.	Prefecture
Honda FC	43rd	Shizuoka

=== Prefectural tournaments ===
All the 47 prefectural tournaments winners. They all entered in the first round.

Prefecture	Team	League	L.	Apps.
Hokkaido	BTOP Hokkaido	Hokkaido Soccer League	5	1st
Aomori	Vanraure Hachinohe	J3 League	3	11th
Iwate	Iwate Grulla Morioka	J3 League	3	16th
Miyagi	Sony Sendai	Japan Football League	4	24th
Akita	North Asia University	Tohoku University League D1	UL1	2nd
Yamagata	Yamagata University; Faculty of Medicine	–	7+	4th
Fukushima	Fukushima United	J3 League	3	11th
Ibaraki	University of Tsukuba	Kanto University League D1	UL1	33rd
Tochigi	Tochigi City	Kanto Soccer League D1	5	13th
Gunma	Tonan Maebashi	Kanto Soccer League D2	6	7th
Saitama	Tokyo International University FC	Kanto Soccer League D1	5	3rd
Chiba	Briobecca Urayasu	Japan Football League	4	6th
Tokyo	Criacao Shinjuku	Japan Football League	4	1st
Kanagawa	SC Sagamihara	J3 League	3	2nd
Yamanashi	YGU Pegasus	Yamanashi Football League	7	5th
Nagano	Nagano Parceiro	J3 League	3	11th
Niigata	Niigata University of Health and Welfare	Hokushin'etsu University League D1	UL1	7th
Toyama	Kataller Toyama	J3 League	3	14th
Ishikawa	Hokuriku University	Hokushin'etsu University League D1	UL1	6th
Fukui	Fukui United	Hokushin'etsu Football League D1	5	15th
Shizuoka	Azul Claro Numazu	J3 League	3	2nd
Aichi	Maruyasu Okazaki	Japan Football League	4	5th
Mie	Veertien Mie	Japan Football League	4	3rd
Gifu	FC Gifu	J3 League	3	17th
Shiga	Reilac Shiga	Japan Football League	4	10th
Kyoto	Laranja Kyoto	Kansai Soccer League D2	6	1st
Osaka	Kansai University	Kansai University League D1	UL1	18th
Hyogo	Cento Cuore Harima	Kansai Soccer League D1	5	11th
Nara	Nara Club	J3 League	3	14th
Wakayama	Arterivo Wakayama	Kansai Soccer League D1	5	15th
Tottori	Gainare Tottori	J3 League	3	25th
Shimane	Belugarosso Iwami	Chugoku Soccer League	5	2nd
Okayama	Mitsubishi Mizushima	Chugoku Soccer League	5	15th
Hiroshima	SRC Hiroshima	Chugoku Soccer League	5	7th
Yamaguchi	Baleine Shimonoseki	Chugoku Soccer League	5	3rd
Kagawa	Kamatamare Sanuki	J3 League	3	23rd
Tokushima	FC Tokushima	Shikoku Soccer League	5	8th
Ehime	FC Imabari	J3 League	3	13th
Kochi	Kochi United	Japan Football League	4	8th
Fukuoka	Giravanz Kitakyushu	J3 League	3	14th
Saga	Brew Kashima	Kyushu Soccer League	5	11th
Nagasaki	Mitsubishi Nagasaki SC	Nagasaki Football League	7	10th
Kumamoto	Tokai University Kumamoto	Kyushu University League D2	UL2	4th
Oita	Verspah Oita	Japan Football League	4	13th
Miyazaki	Tegevajaro Miyazaki	J3 League	3	3rd
Kagoshima	Kagoshima United	J3 League	3	9th
Okinawa	FC Ryukyu	J3 League	3	16th

- Note: In the sections below, club tiers (league levels) are presented as follows:
  - National: (1): J1 League; (2): J2 League; (3): J3 League; (4): Japan Football League
  - Regional (senior): (5): Regional Leagues 1st Divs.; (6): Regional Leagues 2nd Divs.
  - Prefectural (senior): (7): Prefectural Leagues 1st Divs.
  - Regional (university): (UL): University Regional Leagues
  - Others (?): Below the cited club tiers, unknown or not affiliated with any league.

== Calendar ==
The schedule from the first round to the quarter-finals was announced on 20 December 2022. The semi-finals and the final did not have its dates released by the Japan Football Association, as uncertainties around the schedule of the 2023 AFC Asian Cup left doubts about possible reschedule of one or more rounds of the Emperor's Cup. The decision was also made to avoid schedule conflict for teams whose squads would have one or more players participating in the competition.

Round	Date (alternative date)	Matches	Clubs	New entries this round
First round	20–21 May (22 May)	24	48 (47+1) → 24	1 seeded amateur team; 47 prefectural qualification cup winners
Second round	7–21 June	32	64 (24+18+22) → 32	18 2023 J1 League clubs; 22 2023 J2 League clubs
Third round	12 July (19 July)	16	32 → 16	
Fourth round	2 August (9 August)	8	16 → 8	
Quarter-finals	30 August (13 Sep)	4	8 → 4	
Semi-finals	8 October	2	4 → 2	
Final	9 December	1	2 → 1	

== Schedule ==
=== First round ===
The match pairings was decided on 22 March 2023. Except for Honda FC, who was granted a bye from prefectural qualifications due to their "amateur designated team" status, no other club had yet qualified to the tournament when the draw was conducted.

Number of teams per tier in this round
J3 League (3)	Japan Football League (4)	Regional 1st Divs. (5)	Regional 2nd Divs. (6)	Prefectural Leagues (7+)	University Leagues (UL)	Total
16 / 16	9 / 9	11 / 11	3 / 3	3 / 3	6 / 6	48 / 88

21 May Match 1	Briobecca Urayasu (4)	3–2	(UL) University of Tsukuba	Ichihara
13:00 JST	Murakoshi 13'; Ito 34'; Hayashi 79'	Report; Report	Uchino 22'; Sumi 64'	Stadium: ZA Oripri Stadium; Attendance: 564; Referee: Masakazu Kato

21 May Match 2	Kataller Toyama (3)	2–1	(UL) Hokuriku University	Takaoka
13:00 JST	Takahashi 34'; Nabeta 49'	Report; Report	Miyata 67'	Stadium: Takaoka Sports Core; Attendance: 1,098; Referee: Kazuyoshi Karashima

21 May Match 3	Reilac Shiga (4)	2–1 (a.e.t.)	(3) Azul Claro Numazu	Shiga
13:00 JST	Matano 75'; Hirao 120+2'	Report; Report	Browne 58'	Stadium: Hikone Sports Park Athletic Stadium; Attendance: 1,012; Referee: Tatsuya Sakai

21 May Match 4	Veertien Mie (4)	2–0	(3) Gainare Tottori	Suzuka
13:00 JST	Kawanaka 45+4'; Anzai 84'	Report; Report		Stadium: Mie Suzuka Sports Garden; Attendance: 604; Referee: Ryo Munakata

20 May Match 5	Arterivo Wakayama (5)	1–3	(UL) Kansai University	Wakayama
13:00 JST	Ohashi 24'	Report; Report	Nishimura 17', 71'; Koga 90'	Stadium: Kimiidera Athletic Stadium; Attendance: 420; Referee: Takamasa Funahashi

21 May Match 6	Vanraure Hachinohe (3)	2–3 (a.e.t.)	(4) Sony Sendai	Hachinohe
13:00 JST	Chikaishi 23'; Yamauchi 117'	Report; Report	Sawada 67'; Yoshino 95'; Ito 111'	Stadium: Prifoods Stadium; Attendance: 619; Referee: Taku Nagaya

21 May Match 7	Nara Club (3)	0–1	(4) Honda FC	Nara
13:00 JST		Report; Report	Kawanami 63'	Stadium: Rohto Field Nara; Attendance: 792; Referee: Akifumi Kawakatsu

20 May Match 8	Nagano Parceiro (3)	2–0	(6) Laranja Kyoto	Matsumoto
13:00 JST	Yamamoto 22'; Nishimura 82'	Report; Report		Stadium: Sunpro Alwin; Attendance: 871; Referee: Yoshihito Hori

20 May Match 9	Kamatamare Sanuki (3)	2–1	(5) Brew Kashima	Marugame
15:00 JST	Iwagishi 49'; Mori 73'	Report; Report	Takebe 15'	Stadium: Pikara Stadium; Attendance: 600; Referee: Kenya Ohara

21 May Match 10	Fukui United (5)	0–1	(5) Cento Cuore Harima	Sakai
13:00 JST		Report; Report	Takase 44'	Stadium: Technoport Fukui Stadium; Attendance: 622; Referee: Yuki Nishida

21 May Match 11	BTOP Hokkaido (5)	7–0	(?) Yamagata University FM	Sapporo
13:00 JST	Motozuka 34'; Abe 40', 71', 80'; Kawakami 48'; Yoshiyuki 66'; Unno 89'	Report; Report		Stadium: Sapporo Atsubetsu Stadium; Attendance: 231; Referee: Kentaro Kobayashi

21 May Match 12	Giravanz Kitakyushu (3)	2–2 (a.e.t.) (4–1 p)	(3) Kagoshima United	Kitakyushu
13:00 JST	Koh Seung-jin 42'; Oishi 115'	Report; Report	Fujimoto 15'; Take 98'	Stadium: Mikuni World Stadium Kitakyushu; Attendance: 1,731; Referee: Koki Yasukawa
	Penalties
	Okada (penalty scored); Hirahara (penalty scored); Muramatsu (penalty scored); Yoshimaru (penalty scored)		Arita (penalty missed); Take (penalty missed); Endo (penalty scored)

20 May Match 13	Tochigi City (5)	4–1 (a.e.t.)	(4) Maruyasu Okazaki	Utsunomiya
13:00 JST	Henik 41'; Oshima 101'; Yamamura 105'; Fujiwara 105+1'	Report; Report	Maeda 74'	Stadium: Tochigi Green Stadium; Attendance: 359; Referee: Yoshito Nakagawa

21 May Match 14	Belugarosso Iwami (5)	1–2	(4) Kochi United	Izumo
13:00 JST	Suizu 45+1'	Report; Report	Sasaki 43'; Toya 113'	Stadium: Hamayama Park Athletic Field; Attendance: 589; Referee: Ryuhei Yamaguchi

21 May Match 15	Iwate Grulla Morioka (3)	4–0	(4) Criacao Shinjuku	Morioka
13:00 JST	Otabor 13', 84'; Douglas Oliveira 16'; Jang Hyun-soo 73'	Report; Report		Stadium: Iwagin Stadium; Attendance: 626; Referee: Yu Tezuka

21 May Match 16	Tonan Maebashi (6)	3–4	(7) YGU Pegasus	Maebashi
13:00 JST	Takahashi 38'; Yanagihara 74'; Misao 88'	Report; Report	Kato 40', 58'; Miyagawa 62'; Okazawa 90+8'	Stadium: Earth Care Shikishima Stadium; Attendance: 301; Referee: Daichi Shiino

21 May Match 17	SC Sagamihara (3)	2–1 (a.e.t.)	(5) Tokyo Int. University FC	Hiratsuka
13:00 JST	Wakabayashi 70'; Ando 92'	Report; Report	Konishi 29'	Stadium: Lemon Gas Stadium Hiratsuka; Attendance: 694; Referee: Takeshi Tsukahara

21 May Match 18	Verspah Oita (4)	2–1	(5) Baleine Shimonoseki	Oita
12:00 JST	Fukumiya 55'; Sakai 114'	Report; Report	Muneno 88'	Stadium: Resonac Soccer/Rugby Field A Court; Attendance: 312; Referee: Shohei Ofuji

21 May Match 19	SRC Hiroshima (5)	1–3	(5) FC Tokushima	Fukuyama
13:00 JST	Niino 14'	Report; Report	Sasaki 26'; Hattori 55'; Nomura 72'	Stadium: Fukuyama Stadium; Attendance: 364; Referee: Hiroki Murata

21 May Match 20	FC Imabari (3)	1–0	(7) Mitsubishi Nagasaki	Matsuyama
13:00 JST	Índio 63'	Report; Report		Stadium: Ningineer Stadium; Attendance: 707; Referee: Kakuro Hori

20 May Match 21	FC Gifu (3)	2–1	(UL) Niigata University HW	Gifu
13:00 JST	Nduka 71'; Fujioka 88'	Report; Report	Matsuya 87'	Stadium: Gifu Nagaragawa Meadow; Attendance: 887; Referee: Yuichi Hanakawa

20 May Match 22	Fukushima United (3)	4–0	(UL) North Asia University	Fukushima
13:00 JST	Shiohama 29'; Higuchi 33'; Mori 41'; Omori 81'	Report; Report		Stadium: Toho Stadium; Attendance: 319; Referee: Toshiki Tomomasa

20 May Match 23	Tegevajaro Miyazaki (3)	3–0	(UL) Tokai University Kumamoto	Shintomi
13:00 JST	Nagata 40'; Minamino 71'; Kitamura 89'	Report; Report		Stadium: Unilever Stadium Shintomi; Attendance: 411; Referee: Yuki Tanabe

21 May Match 24	FC Ryukyu (3)	2–1	(5) Mitsubishi Mizushima	Okinawa
13:00 JST	Kelvin 12'; Yanagi 81'	Report; Report	Miyazawa 33'	Stadium: Tapic Kenso Hiyagon Stadium; Attendance: 454; Referee: Shinya Sasaki

=== Second round ===
Number of teams remaining in the competition
J1 League (1)	J2 League (2)	J3 League (3)	Japan Football League (4)	Regional 1st Div. (5)	Regional 2nd Div. (6)	Prefectural Leagues (7 or 7+)	University Leagues (UL)	Total
18 / 18	22 / 22	11 / 16	7 / 9	4 / 11	1 / 3	1 / 3	0 / 6	64 / 88

All the 2023 J1 and J2 League clubs enter the competition in this round. Most of these professional clubs hosted their matches in their own prefecture. However, as the number of teams from these leagues combined does not match the amount of host teams required, some of these teams had to play their matches away from home. These specific away teams either finished between the 15th to 20th place on last season's J2 or got promoted from the J3 League for the 2023 season, and played their ties against teams that finished between the 7th and 14th place on last season's J2.

7 June Match 25	Yokohama F. Marinos (1)	2–0	(4) Briobecca Urayasu	Yokohama
19:00 JST	Inoue 26'; Eduardo 78'	Report; Report		Stadium: NHK Spring Mitsuzawa Football Stadium; Attendance: 4,287; Referee: Koichiro Fukushima

7 June Match 26	Zweigen Kanazawa (2)	2–3	(2) Machida Zelvia	Kanazawa
19:00 JST	Toyoda 23'; Nagamine 88'	Report; Report	Matsui 38'; Kurokawa 43'; Nakashima 79'	Stadium: Ishikawa Athletics Stadium; Attendance: 1,177; Referee: Reo Tanaka

7 June Match 27	Kyoto Sanga (1)	2–2 (a.e.t.) (9–10 p)	(3) Kataller Toyama	Kyoto
19:00 JST	Iyoha 32'; Patric 90+1'	Report; Report	Ono 6', 57'	Stadium: Takebishi Stadium Kyoto; Attendance: 2,273; Referee: Koji Takasaki
	Penalties
	Patric (penalty scored); Hirato (penalty scored); Kimura (penalty scored); Iyoha (penalty missed); Kinoshita (penalty scored); Kaneko (penalty scored); Asada (penalty scored); Ueda (penalty scored); Tawiah (penalty scored); Ota (penalty scored); Patric (penalty missed)		(penalty scored) Usui; (penalty scored) Ando; (penalty missed) Yagishita; (penalty scored) Matsuoka; (penalty scored) Takahashi; (penalty scored) Wakimoto; (penalty scored) Kamiyama; (penalty scored) Shiina; (penalty scored) Ohata; (penalty scored) Tagawa; (penalty scored) Usui

7 June Match 28	Albirex Niigata (1)	1–0	(4) Reilac Shiga	Niigata
19:00 JST	Danilo Gomes 38'	Report; Report		Stadium: Denka Big Swan Stadium; Attendance: 4,285; Referee: Hiroyuki Kimura

7 June Match 29	Nagoya Grampus (1)	3–2	(4) Veertien Mie	Nagoya
19:00 JST	Nogami 2'; Fujii 35'; Kida 42'	Report; Report	Tamura 71'; Ryang Hyon-ju 76'	Stadium: Paloma Mizuho Rugby Stadium; Attendance: 5,340; Referee: Hirokazu Otsubo

7 June Match 30	Vegalta Sendai (2)	1–0	(2) Fujieda MYFC	Sendai
19:00 JST	Nakayama 45'	Report; Report		Stadium: Yurtec Stadium Sendai; Attendance: 2,495; Referee: Koei Koya

7 June Match 31	Urawa Red Diamonds (1)	1–0 (a.e.t.)	(UL) Kansai University	Saitama
19:00 JST	Ito 105'	Report; Report		Stadium: Urawa Komaba Stadium; Attendance: 5,391; Referee: Hiroyoshi Takayama

7 June Match 32	Montedio Yamagata (2)	1–0	(4) Sony Sendai	Tendō
19:00 JST	Tanaka 27'	Report; Report		Stadium: ND Soft Stadium Yamagata; Attendance: 2,552; Referee: Tomokazu Sato

7 June Match 33	Kashima Antlers (1)	3–0	(4) Honda FC	Kashima
19:00 JST	Kim Min-tae 13'; Arthur Caíke 39'; Someno 68'	Report; Report		Stadium: Kashima Soccer Stadium; Attendance: 3,837; Referee: Yoshimi Yamashita

7 June Match 34	V-Varen Nagasaki (2)	0–1	(2) Ventforet Kofu	Isahaya
19:00 JST		Report; Report	Edigar Junio 7' (o.g.)	Stadium: Transcosmos Stadium Nagasaki; Attendance: 2,304; Referee: Toru Kakinuma

14 June (Note: The match was originally due to be played on 7 June. But on 9 May, in response to a request from Vissel Kobe, the Emperor's Cup Executive Committee decided to postpone the match to 14 June. Likely, the postponement was related to Vissel Kobe's friendly match against FC Barcelona, played around that date.) Match 35	Vissel Kobe (1)	3–1	(3) Nagano Parceiro	Kobe
19:00 JST	Lincoln 12', 29'; Yuruki 64'	Report; Report	Nishimura 45+1'	Stadium: Noevir Stadium Kobe; Attendance: 3,332; Referee: Hayato Shimizu

7 June Match 36	Júbilo Iwata (2)	2–0	(3) Kamatamare Sanuki	Iwata
19:00 JST	González 6', 36'	Report; Report		Stadium: Yamaha Stadium; Attendance: 2,483; Referee: Kentaro Uematsu

7 June Match 37	Cerezo Osaka (1)	5–0	(5) Cento Cuore Harima	Osaka
19:00 JST	Kitano 7', 74'; Sakata 53'; Ishiwatari 55'; Maikuma 81'	Report; Report		Stadium: Yodoko Sakura Stadium; Attendance: 2,489; Referee: Yuzo Sutani

7 June Match 38	JEF United Chiba (2)	0–1	(2) Omiya Ardija	Chiba
19:00 JST		Report; Report	Nakano 50'	Stadium: Fukuda Denshi Arena; Attendance: 2,281; Referee: Ryo Tanimoto

7 June Match 39	Shonan Bellmare (1)	6–1	(5) BTOP Hokkaido	Hiratsuka
19:00 JST	Suzuki 8', 14', 43'; Nagaki 48'; Abe 54'; Wakatsuki 82'	Report; Report	Unno 71'	Stadium: Lemon Gas Stadium Hiratsuka; Attendance: 1,632; Referee: Sho Kawamata

7 June Match 40	Fagiano Okayama (2)	2–1	(3) Giravanz Kitakyushu	Okayama
19:00 JST	Sakuragawa 45+1', 53'	Report; Report	Hirahara 78'	Stadium: City Light Stadium; Attendance: 2,564; Referee: Shuhei Ishimaru

7 June Match 41	Kawasaki Frontale (1)	3–1	(5) Tochigi City	Kawasaki
19:00 JST	Tono 18', 71'; Miyashiro 89'	Report; Report	Toshima 65'	Stadium: Kawasaki Todoroki Stadium; Attendance: 5,325; Referee: Yuichi Nishimura

7 June Match 42	Mito HollyHock (2)	1–0	(2) Renofa Yamaguchi	Mito
19:00 JST	Toyama 88'	Report; Report		Stadium: K's denki Stadium Mito; Attendance: 902; Referee: Takuto Okabe

7 June Match 43	Gamba Osaka (1)	1–2	(4) Kochi United	Suita
19:00 JST	Miura 87'	Report; Report	Kobayashi 4'; Miura 41' (o.g.)	Stadium: Panasonic Stadium Suita; Attendance: 3,059; Referee: Akihiko Ikeuchi

21 June Match 44	Yokohama FC (1)	4–1	(3) Iwate Grulla Morioka	Yokohama
19:00 JST	Nakamura 35'; Saulo Mineiro 68', 73'; Saito 79'	Report; Report	Matsubara 15'	Stadium: NHK Spring Mitsuzawa Football Stadium; Attendance: 1,820; Referee: Jumpei Iida

7 June Match 45	Kashiwa Reysol (1)	7–1	(7) YGU Pegasus	Kashiwa
19:00 JST	Nakamura 4'; Maie 21', 45+1', 59'; Masukake 36' (pen.); Ochiai 49'; Yamamoto 87'	Report; Report	Matsubara 80'	Stadium: Sankyo Frontier Kashiwa Stadium; Attendance: 1,819; Referee: Keigo Sendachi

7 June Match 46	Tokushima Vortis (2)	2–1 (a.e.t.)	(2) Iwaki FC	Naruto
19:00 JST	Tanahashi 90+5'; Chiba 115'	Report; Report	Endo 90+3'	Stadium: Pocarisweat Stadium; Attendance: 1,441; Referee: Yudai Yamamoto

7 June Match 47	Consadole Sapporo (1)	3–0	(3) SC Sagamihara	Sapporo
19:00 JST	Kim Gun-hee 53'; Fukai 62'; Nakashima 78'	Report; Report		Stadium: Sapporo Atsubetsu Park Stadium; Attendance: 2,647; Referee: Hajime Matsuo

7 June Match 48	Oita Trinita (2)	0–1	(4) Verspah Oita	Oita
19:00 JST		Report; Report	Nakamura 6'	Stadium: Resonac Dome Oita; Attendance: 4,122; Referee: Tetsuro Yoshida

7 June Match 49	Sanfrecce Hiroshima (1)	5–0	(5) FC Tokushima	Fukuyama
18:30 JST	Ben Khalifa 7'; T. Matsumoto 33' (pen.); H. Matsumoto 75'; Nakano 72'; Morishima 79'	Report; Report		Stadium: Fukuyama Stadium; Attendance: 3,263; Referee: Masuya Ueda

7 June Match 50	Blaublitz Akita (2)	1–2	(2) Tochigi SC	Akita
19:00 JST	Yoshida 69'	Report; Report	Oshima 19'; Nemoto 84'	Stadium: Soyu Stadium; Attendance: 674; Referee: Yoshiro Imamura

7 June Match 51	Avispa Fukuoka (1)	2–0	(3) FC Imabari	Fukuoka
19:00 JST	Wellington 51'; Sato 80'	Report; Report		Stadium: Best Denki Stadium; Attendance: 2,033; Referee: Futoshi Nakamura

7 June Match 52	Shimizu S-Pulse (2)	1–2	(3) FC Gifu	Shimizu
19:00 JST	Carlinhos Jr. 82'	Report; Report	Taguchi 75'; Kita 103'	Stadium: IAI Stadium Nihondaira; Attendance: 2,493; Referee: Yosuke Kubota

7 June Match 53	FC Tokyo (1)	3–1	(3) Fukushima United	Chōfu
19:00 JST	Tsukagawa 19'; Adaílton 30'; Matsuki 58'	Report; Report	Shiohama 12'	Stadium: Ajinomoto Stadium; Attendance: 3,827; Referee: Kazuyoshi Enomoto

7 June Match 54	Tokyo Verdy (2)	2–1	(2) Thespakusatsu Gunma	Kita
18:30 JST	Yamada 44'; Own goal 83'	Report; Report	Nishitani 36' (o.g.)	Stadium: Ajinomoto Field Nishigaoka; Attendance: 1,901; Referee: Tatsuya Sakai

7 June Match 55	Sagan Tosu (1)	5–1	(3) Tegevajaro Miyazaki	Tosu
19:00 JST	Hwang Seok-ho 34'; Fujita 54'; Fujihara 56', 90+2'; Kabayama 90+1'	Report; Report	Minamino 36'	Stadium: Ekimae Real Estate Stadium; Attendance: 2,808; Referee: Hiroki Kasahara

21 June Match 56	Roasso Kumamoto (2)	2–2 (a.e.t.) (5–4 p)	(3) FC Ryukyu	Kumamoto
19:00 JST	Higashiyama 49'; Omoto 53'	Report; Report	Kanazaki 25'; Iwamoto 38'	Stadium: Egao Kenko Stadium; Attendance: 1,455; Referee: Koki Nagamine
	Penalties
	Higashiyama (penalty scored); Toshida (penalty scored); Tashiro (penalty scored); Tanabe (penalty scored); Hirakawa (penalty scored)		(penalty missed) Yanagi; (penalty scored) Kagiyama; (penalty scored) Mori; (penalty scored) Uehara; (penalty scored) Sulley

=== Third round ===
Number of teams remaining in the competition
J1 League (1)	J2 League (2)	J3 League (3)	Japan Football League (4)	Lower-tier leagues	Total
16 / 18	12 / 22	2 / 16	2 / 9	0 / 23	32 / 88

12 July Match 57	Yokohama F. Marinos (1)	1–4	(2) Machida Zelvia	Machida
18:33 JST	Inoue 84'	Report; Report	Duke 5'; Fuseya 45+4'; Hirakawa 66', 78'	Stadium: Machida GION Stadium; Attendance: 6,361; Referee: Yuichi Nishimura

12 July (19 July) (Note: The match #58 was kicked off on 12 July, but suspended after the first half of the extra time due to thunderstorm. It was determined on 13 July that the remainder of the match should be played on 19 July.) Match 58	Kataller Toyama (3)	3–4 (a.e.t.)	(1) Albirex Niigata	Toyama
19:00 JST	Matsuoka 58', 78'; Ono 120+1'	Report; Report	Hasegawa 20'; Ota 82', 95'; Tagami 112'	Stadium: Toyama Stadium; Attendance: 6,093; Referee: Keigo Sendachi

12 July Match 59	Nagoya Grampus (1)	1–1 (a.e.t.) (5–4 p)	(2) Vegalta Sendai	Nagoya
19:00 JST	Mateus 99'	Report; Report	Sugawara 105'	Stadium: CS Asset Minato Soccer Stadium; Attendance: 3,423; Referee: Hayato Shimizu
	Penalties
	Mateus (penalty scored); Inagaki (penalty scored); Fujii (penalty scored); Nakatani (penalty scored); Junker (penalty scored)		(penalty scored) Nakajima; (penalty scored) Heo; (penalty scored) Sugawara; (penalty scored) Matsushita; (penalty missed) Hachisuka

12 July Match 60	Urawa Red Diamonds (1)	1–0	(2) Montedio Yamagata	Tendo
19:00 JST	Ito 64'	Report; Report		Stadium: ND Soft Stadium Yamagata; Attendance: 6,520; Referee: Jumpei Iida

12 July Match 61	Kashima Antlers (1)	1–1 (a.e.t.) (10–11 p)	(2) Ventforet Kofu	Kōfu
19:00 JST	Kakita 62'	Report; Report	Nozawa 51'	Stadium: JIT Recycle Ink Stadium; Attendance: 6,301; Referee: Hiroyuki Kimura
	Penalties
	Pituca (penalty scored); Higuchi (penalty missed); Doi (penalty scored); Sekigawa (penalty scored); Nakama (penalty missed); Anzai (penalty scored); Matsumura (penalty scored); Ueda (penalty scored); Shoji (penalty scored); Oki (penalty scored); Suzuki (penalty scored); Pituca (penalty scored); Higuchi (penalty missed)		(penalty scored) Sugai; (penalty missed) Getúlio; (penalty scored) Hasegawa; (penalty scored) Utaka; (penalty missed) Mancha; (penalty scored) Nozawa; (penalty scored) Shinada; (penalty scored) Hasukawa; (penalty scored) Matsumoto; (penalty scored) Kobayashi; (penalty scored) Shibuya; (penalty scored) Sugai; (penalty scored) Getúlio

12 July Match 62	Vissel Kobe (1)	5–2	(2) Júbilo Iwata	Iwata
19:00 JST	Saito 13'; Kawasaki 24', 66'; Yuruki 30'; Sasaki 39'	Report; Report	Funahashi 61'; Furukawa 81'	Stadium: Yamaha Stadium; Attendance: 3,840; Referee: Yoshiro Imamura

12 July Match 63	Cerezo Osaka (1)	3–1	(2) Omiya Ardija	Osaka
19:00 JST	Uejo 59', 65'; Ceará 82'	Report; Report	Shibayama 85'	Stadium: Yodoko Sakura Stadium; Attendance: 3,544; Referee: Yusuke Araki

12 July Match 64	Shonan Bellmare (1)	2–0	(2) Fagiano Okayama	Okayama
19:00 JST	Suzuki 73'; Ishii 88'	Report; Report		Stadium: City Light Stadium; Attendance: 3,216; Referee: Hajime Matsuo

12 July Match 65	Kawasaki Frontale (1)	2–1	(2) Mito HollyHock	Mito
19:03 JST	Seko 25'; Miyashiro 80'	Report; Report	Teranuma 81'	Stadium: K's denki Stadium Mito; Attendance: 2,498; Referee: Takafumi Mikuriya

12 July Match 66	Kochi United (4)	1–0	(1) Yokohama FC	Kochi
19:00 JST	Takano 56'	Report; Report		Stadium: Kochi Haruno Athletic Stadium; Attendance: 3,041; Referee: Koji Takasaki

12 July Match 67	Kashiwa Reysol (1)	2–0	(2) Tokushima Vortis	Naruto
19:00 JST	Maie 44', 50'	Report; Report		Stadium: Pocarisweat Stadium; Attendance: 1,682; Referee: Akihiko Ikeuchi

12 July Match 68	Hokkaido Consadole Sapporo (1)	5–2	(4) Verspah Oita	Oita
19:00 JST	Kim 34', 43'; Fukumori 56'; Izuma 88', 90+5'	Report; Report	Nakano 38', 60'	Stadium: Resonac Dome Oita; Attendance: 1,418; Referee: Takuto Okabe

12 July Match 69	Sanfrecce Hiroshima (1)	0–2	(2) Tochigi SC	Utsunomiya
19:00 JST		Report; Report	Oshima 54' (pen.); Nishiya 90+4'	Stadium: Kanseki Stadium Tochigi; Attendance: 2,552; Referee: Yudai Yamamoto

12 July Match 70	Avispa Fukuoka (1)	2–1 (a.e.t.)	(3) FC Gifu	Gifu
19:00 JST	Sato 84'; Grolli 114'	Report; Report	Hada 40'	Stadium: Gifu Nagaragawa Stadium; Attendance: 2,010; Referee: Koei Koya

12 July Match 71	FC Tokyo (1)	1–1 (a.e.t.) (9–8 p)	(2) Tokyo Verdy	Tokyo
19:00 JST	Tsukagawa 20'	Report; Report	Shirai 70'	Stadium: Ajinomoto Stadium; Attendance: 17,497; Referee: Futoshi Nakamura
	Penalties
	Matsuki (penalty scored); Kimoto (penalty scored); Tsukagawa (penalty scored); Kumata (penalty scored); Nagatomo (penalty scored); Abe (penalty scored); Terayama (penalty scored); Koizumi (penalty scored); Higashi (penalty scored)		(penalty scored) Kitajima; (penalty scored) Koike; (penalty scored) Sagawa; (penalty scored) Yamakoshi; (penalty scored) Narawa; (penalty scored) Nishitani; (penalty scored) Tsunashima; (penalty scored) Shirai; (penalty missed) Chida

12 July Match 72	Sagan Tosu (1)	3–4 (a.e.t.)	(2) Roasso Kumamoto	Tosu
19:00 JST	Fukuta 10'; Nishikawa 41'; Yokoyama 61'	Report; Report	Matsuoka 52', 56'; Michiwaki 90', 95'	Stadium: Ekimae Real Estate Stadium; Attendance: 3,864; Referee: Koichiro Fukushima

=== Round of 16 ===
Number of teams remaining in the competition
J1 League (1)	J2 League (2)	J3 League (3)	Japan Football League (4)	Total
11 / 18	4 / 22	0 / 16	1 / 9	16 / 88

2 August Match 73	Machida Zelvia (2)	0–1	(1) Albirex Niigata	Machida
18:30 JST		Report; Report	Komi 90'	Stadium: Machida GION Stadium; Attendance: 3,436; Referee: Yoshiro Imamura

2 August Match 74	Nagoya Grampus (1)	3–0	(1) Urawa Red Diamonds	Nagoya
19:03 JST	Mateus 25'; Junker 75'; Izumi 83'	Report; Report		Stadium: CS Asset Minato Soccer Stadium; Attendance: 6,975; Referee: Takuto Okabe

2 August Match 75	Ventforet Kofu (2)	1–4	(1) Vissel Kobe	Kōfu
19:03 JST	Miyazaki 20'	Report; Report	Mancha 52' (o.g.); Muto 59'; Osako 78'; Jean Patric 86'	Stadium: JIT Recycle Ink Stadium; Attendance: 7,467; Referee: Hajime Matsuo

2 August Match 76	Cerezo Osaka (1)	1–1 (a.e.t.) (4–5 p)	(1) Shonan Bellmare	Osaka
19:03 JST	Léo Ceará 90+4' (pen.)	Report; Report	Ohashi 12' (pen.)	Stadium: Yodoko Sakura Stadium; Attendance: 4,567; Referee: Masuya Ueda
	Penalties
	Maikuma (penalty scored); Funaki (penalty scored); Léo Ceará (penalty scored); Watanabe (penalty scored); Kagawa (penalty missed); Kitano (penalty missed); Arai (penalty missed)		(penalty scored) Tanaka; (penalty scored) Suzuki; (penalty scored) Ishii; (penalty scored) Okuno; (penalty missed) Yamada; (penalty missed) Sugioka; (penalty scored) Matsumura

2 August Match 77	Kawasaki Frontale (1)	1–0	(4) Kochi United	Kōchi
19:05 JST	Sasaki 14'	Report; Report		Stadium: Kochi Haruno Athletic Stadium; Attendance: 7,243; Referee: Kazuhiro Ikeda

2 August Match 78	Kashiwa Reysol (1)	1–0	(1) Hokkaido Consadole Sapporo	Kashiwa
19:03 JST	Shiihashi 90'	Report; Report		Stadium: Sankyo Frontier Kashiwa Stadium; Attendance: 4,676; Referee: Shu Kawamata

2 August Match 79	Tochigi SC (2)	2–4 (a.e.t.)	(1) Avispa Fukuoka	Utsunomiya
19:00 JST	Nemoto 45+3' (pen.), 51'	Report; Report	Sato 20'; Wellington 54'; Lukian 114'; Yamagishi 117'	Stadium: Kanseki Stadium Tochigi; Attendance: 2,368; Referee: Kazuyoshi Enomoto

2 August Match 80	FC Tokyo (1)	0–2	(2) Roasso Kumamoto	Kumamoto
19:03 JST		Report; Report	Hirakawa 4' (pen.); Matsuoka 54'	Stadium: Egao Kenko Stadium; Attendance: 6,286; Referee: Atsushi Kamimura

=== Quarter-finals ===
Number of teams remaining in the competition
J1 League (1)	J2 League (2)	Total
7 / 18	1 / 22	8 / 88

30 August Match 81	Albirex Niigata (1)	2–2 (a.e.t.) (3–4 p)	(1) Kawasaki Frontale	Niigata
19:00 JST	Taniguchi 30'; Hayakawa 120+1'	Report; Report	Seko 68'; Yamada 109'	Stadium: Denka Big Swan Stadium; Attendance: 10,287; Referee: Yusuke Araki
	Penalties
	Suzuki (penalty scored); Mito (penalty scored); Danilo Gomes (penalty missed); Horigome (penalty scored); Ko (penalty missed)		(penalty scored) Kobayashi; (penalty scored) Segawa; (penalty scored) Yamamura; (penalty scored) Tono; (penalty missed) Yamada

30 August Match 82	Avispa Fukuoka (1)	3–1	(1) Shonan Bellmare	Fukuoka
19:00 JST	Yamagishi 44', 67'; Sato 73'	Report; Report	Suzuki 4'	Stadium: Best Denki Stadium; Attendance: 3,325; Referee: Hiroki Kasahara

30 August Match 83	Roasso Kumamoto (2)	1–1 (a.e.t.) (4–3 p)	(1) Vissel Kobe	Kumamoto
19:00 JST	Hirakawa 60'	Report; Report	Jean Patric 87'	Stadium: Egao Kenkō Stadium; Attendance: 10,512; Referee: Takafumi Mikuriya
	Penalties
	Kuroki (penalty scored); Higashiyama (penalty missed); Tashiro (penalty scored); Aihara (penalty scored); Hirakawa (penalty scored)		(penalty scored) Osako; (penalty missed) Muto; (penalty scored) Yamaguchi; (penalty missed) Osaki; (penalty scored) Ide

30 August Match 84	Kashiwa Reysol (1)	2–0	(1) Nagoya Grampus	Kashiwa
19:00 JST	Toshima 69'; Matheus Sávio 90+3'	Report; Report		Stadium: Sankyo Frontier Kashiwa Stadium; Attendance: 6,156; Referee: Jumpei Iida

=== Semi-finals ===
Number of teams remaining in the competition
J1 League (1)	J2 League (2)	Total
3 / 18	1 / 22	4 / 88

8 October Match 85	Kawasaki Frontale (1)	4–2	(1) Avispa Fukuoka	Kawasaki
13:10 JST	Yamamura 5'; Tachibanada 53'; Marcinho 70'; Damião 81'	Report; Report	Kanamori 42'; Tsuruno 90+6'	Stadium: Kawasaki Todoroki Stadium; Attendance: 18,547; Referee: Futoshi Nakamura

8 October Match 86	Roasso Kumamoto (2)	0–4	(1) Kashiwa Reysol	Kashiwa
15:30 JST		Report; Report	Toshima 9'; Katayama 45+4'; Hosoya 54'; Takamine 90+4'	Stadium: Sankyo Frontier Kashiwa Stadium; Attendance: 12,351; Referee: Yusuke Araki

=== Final ===
Number of teams remaining in the competition
J1 League (1)	Total
2 / 18	2 / 88

9 December Match 87	Kawasaki Frontale (1)	0–0 (a.e.t.) (8–7 p)	Kashiwa Reysol (1)	Shinjuku, Tokyo
14:00 JST		Report; Report		Stadium: Japan National Stadium; Attendance: 62,637; Referee: Hiroyuki Kimura
	Penalties
	Ienaga (penalty scored); Segawa (penalty scored); Yamamura (penalty scored); Tachibanada (penalty scored); Gomis (penalty missed); Noborizato (penalty missed); Tono (penalty scored); Yamane (penalty scored); João Schmidt (penalty scored); Jung Sung-ryong (penalty scored)		(penalty scored) Matheus Sávio; (penalty scored) Hosoya; (penalty scored) Toshima; (penalty missed) Sento; (penalty scored) Muto; (penalty missed) Katayama; (penalty scored) Yamamoto; (penalty scored) Kawaguchi; (penalty scored) Tatsuta; (penalty missed) Matsumoto

== Top scorers ==
Rank	Player	Team	Goals
1	(Japan) Hidetaka Maie	Kashiwa Reysol	5
1	(Japan) Akito Suzuki	Shonan Bellmare	5
3	(Japan) Ryoga Sato	Avispa Fukuoka	4
4	(Japan) Ryoka Abe	BTOP Hokkaido	3
4	(Japan) Ryo Nemoto	Tochigi SC	3
4	(Japan) Yuya Yamagishi	Avispa Fukuoka	3
4	(South Korea) Kim Gun-hee	Hokkaido Consadole Sapporo	3
4	(Japan) Rimu Matsuoka	Roasso Kumamoto	3
9	30 players		2
