= 2023 Tokyo Verdy season =

Tokyo Verdy
2023 season
- Chairman: Yasuo Shimada
- Manager: Hiroshi Jofuku
- Stadium: Ajinomoto Stadium
- J2 League: 3rd (promoted via play-offs)
- Emperor's Cup: Third round
- Top goalscorer: League: Itsuki Someno (6); All: Itsuki Someno (7)
Home colours	Away colours
- All statistics correct as of 18 April 2026.

The 2023 season was Tokyo Verdy's 54th season in existence and the club's 15th consecutive season in the second division of Japanese football. In addition to the domestic league, Tokyo Verdy participated in this season's edition of the Emperor's Cup. The season concluded with a historic achievement, as the club earned promotion to the top flight after 15 years via the promotion play-offs, overcoming Shimizu S-Pulse in a penalty shootout.

== Players ==
=== First-team squad ===
Updated on 28 April 2023.

Note: Flags indicate national team as defined under FIFA eligibility rules; some limited exceptions apply. Players may hold more than one non-FIFA nationality.

No.	Pos.	Nation	Player
1	GK	BRA	Matheus Vidotto (vice-captain)
2	DF	JPN	Daiki Fukazawa
3	DF	JPN	Hiroto Taniguchi (vice-captain)
4	MF	JPN	Ryota Kajikawa
5	DF	JPN	Tomohiro Taira
6	DF	JPN	Kazuya Miyahara
7	MF	JPN	Koki Morita (captain)
8	MF	JPN	Kosuke Saito
9	MF	JPN	Ryuji Sugimoto
11	FW	JPN	Toyofumi Sakano
13	DF	JPN	Naoki Hayashi (on loan from Kashima Antlers)
14	FW	GER	Mario Engels
15	DF	JPN	Kaito Chida
16	DF	JPN	Kohei Yamakoshi
17	MF	JPN	Koken Kato
18	MF	CHI	Byron Vásquez
19	MF	JPN	Junki Koike
20	MF	JPN	Yuji Kitajima (on loan from Avispa Fukuoka)

No.	Pos.	Nation	Player
21	GK	JPN	Yuya Nagasawa
23	MF	JPN	Yuto Tsunashima
24	MF	JPN	Yuta Narawa
25	MF	JPN	Tetsuyuki Inami
26	DF	JPN	Ren Kato
27	FW	JPN	Goki Yamada
28	MF	JPN	Daiki Kusunoki
29	FW	JPN	Keito Kawamura
30	FW	JPN	Kosuke Sagawa
31	GK	JPN	Hisaya Sato
33	MF	JPN	Rikuto Hashimoto
34	MF	JPN	Ryo Nishitani
38	DF	IDN	Pratama Arhan
41	GK	JPN	Masahiro Iida
42	FW	JPN	Ryosuke Shirai ^{Type 2}
43	FW	JPN	Yuki Okubo ^{Type 2}
44	DF	JPN	Kazuya Yamaguchi ^{Type 2}

=== Out on loan ===
Note: Flags indicate national team as defined under FIFA eligibility rules; some limited exceptions apply. Players may hold more than one non-FIFA nationality.

No.	Pos.	Nation	Player
—	GK	JPN	Toru Takagiwa (on loan at Iwaki FC until 31 January 2024)
—	DF	JPN	Maaya Sako (on loan at Nagano Parceiro until 31 January 2024)
—	DF	JPN	Yu Miyamoto (on loan at Kochi United until 31 January 2024)
—	MF	JPN	Kyota Mochii (on loan at Azul Claro Numazu until 31 January 2024)

No.	Pos.	Nation	Player
—	MF	JPN	Taiga Ishiura (on loan at Ehime FC until 31 January 2024)
—	MF	JPN	Mahiro Ano (on loan at Fukui United until 31 January 2024)
—	MF	JPN	Yuan Matsuhashi (on loan at Renofa Yamaguchi until 31 January 2024)

== Transfers ==
=== In ===
Date	Pos.	Name	From	Fee
31 December 2022	FW	(Japan) Mizuki Arai	(Portugal) Gil Vicente	End of loan
9 January 2023	DF	(Japan) Kazuya Miyahara	(Japan) Nagoya Grampus	Free transfer
9 January 2023	FW	(Germany) Mario Engels	(Netherlands) Sparta Rotterdam	Free transfer
9 January 2023	MF	(Japan) Kosuke Saito	(Japan) Yokohama FC	Undisclosed
9 January 2023	DF	(Japan) Kaito Chida	(Japan) Blaublitz Akita	Undisclosed
31 January 2023	MF	(Japan) Yuan Matsuhashi	(Japan) SC Sagamihara	End of loan
31 January 2023	MF	(Japan) Kyota Mochii	(Japan) SC Sagamihara	End of loan
31 January 2023	FW	(Japan) Jin Hanato	(Japan) Kagoshima United	End of loan
1 February 2023	FW	(Japan) Kosuke Sagawa	(Japan) Tokyo International University	Free transfer
1 February 2023	DF	(Japan) Yuto Tsunashima	(Japan) Kokushikan University	Free transfer
1 February 2023	FW	(Japan) Goki Yamada	(England) Kwansei Gakuin	Free Transfer
1 February 2021	GK	(Japan) Masahiro Iida	(Japan) Kokushikan University	Free transfer
1 February 2023	MF	(Japan) Daiki Kusunoki	(Japan) Toin University of Yokohama	Free transfer
1 February 2023	MF	(Japan) Yuji Kitajima	(Japan) Avispa Fukuoka	Loan transfer
1 February 2023	DF	(Japan) Naoki Hayashi	(Japan) Kashima Antlers	Loan transfer
12 June 2023	MF	(Japan) Hidemasa Koda	(Japan) Nagoya Grampus	Loan transfer
4 July 2023	FW	(Japan) Itsuki Someno	(Japan) Kashima Antlers	Loan transfer

=== Out ===
Pos.	Player	Transferred to	Fee	Date	Source
GK	(Japan)	(Japan)			
GK	(Japan)	(Japan)			

== Pre-season and friendlies ==
Win Draw Loss Fixtures

2023 Friendly	Tokyo Verdy (Japan)	v	(Japan)	TBD
17:00

== Competitions ==
=== Overview ===
Competition	First match	Last match	Starting round	Final position	Record							
Competition	First match	Last match	Starting round	Final position	Pld	W	D	L	GF	GA	GD	Win %
J2 League	19 February 2023	12 November 2023	Matchday 1	3rd	42	21	12	9	57	31	+26	50.00
Promotion Play-offs	26 November 2023	2 December 2023	Semifinal	Winners	2	1	1	0	3	2	+1	50.00
Emperor's Cup	7 June 2023	12 July 2023	Second round	Third round	2	1	1	0	3	2	+1	50.00
Total					46	23	14	9	63	35	+28	50.00

Last updated: 18 April 2026
Source: Soccerway

=== J2 League ===
==== League table ====
Pos	Team	Pld	W	D	L	GF	GA	GD	Pts	Promotion or relegation
1	Machida Zelvia (C, P)	42	26	9	7	79	35	+44	87	Promotion to the J1 League
2	Júbilo Iwata (P)	42	21	12	9	74	44	+30	75	Promotion to the J1 League
3	Tokyo Verdy (O, P)	42	21	12	9	57	31	+26	75	Qualification for the promotion play-offs
4	Shimizu S-Pulse	42	20	14	8	78	34	+44	74	Qualification for the promotion play-offs
5	Montedio Yamagata	42	21	4	17	64	54	+10	67	Qualification for the promotion play-offs

Source: Meiji Yasuda J2 League, J.League Data Site
Rules for classification: 1) Points; 2) Goal difference; 3) Goals scored; 4) Head-to-head points; 5) Head-to-head goal difference; 6) Head-to-head goal scored; 7) Fair-play points.
(C) Champions; (O) Play-off winners; (P) Promoted

==== Results summary ====
Overall								Home						Away					
Pld	W	D	L	GF	GA	GD	Pts	W	D	L	GF	GA	GD	W	D	L	GF	GA	GD
42	21	12	9	57	31	+26	75	8	7	6	22	18	+4	13	5	3	35	13	+22

Last updated: 17 May 2023.
Source: Worldfootball

==== Matches ====
The league fixtures were announced on 20 January 2023.

19 February 2023 1	Tokyo Verdy	1–0	Zweigen Kanazawa	Tokyo
14:00 JST (UTC+9)	Kato 68'	Report		Stadium: Ajinomoto Stadium; Attendance: 6,597; Referee: Keisuke Nobori

26 February 2023 2	Oita Trinita	1–0	Tokyo Verdy	Ōita
13:13 JST (UTC+9)	Fujimoto 54'	Report		Stadium: Resonac Dome Oita; Attendance: 15,705; Referee: Hiroyoshi Takayama

5 March 2023 3	Tokyo Verdy	0–0	Ventforet Kofu	Chōfu
14:03 JST (UTC+9)		Report		Stadium: Ajinomoto Stadium; Attendance: 8,448; Referee: Reo Tanaka

12 March 2023 4	Tokushima Vortis	0–2	Tokyo Verdy	Naruto
13:00 JST (UTC+9)		Report		Stadium: Pocarisweat Stadium; Attendance: 6,006; Referee: Dai Matsumoto

19 March 2023 5	Fujieda MYFC	0–5	Tokyo Verdy	Fujieda
14:03 JST (UTC+9)		Report		Stadium: Fujieda Soccer Stadium; Attendance: 3,235; Referee: Yosuke Kubota

25 March 2023 6	Tokyo Verdy	3–0	Roasso Kumamoto	Tokyo
15:00 JST (UTC+9)		Report		Stadium: Ajinomoto Stadium

1 April 2023 7	Tokyo Verdy	1–0	Omiya Ardija	Tokyo
15:03 JST (UTC+9)	Fukazawa 65'	Report		Stadium: Ajinomoto Stadium; Attendance: 5,683; Referee: Hirokazu Otsubo

22 April 2023 11	Tokyo Verdy	1–2	Montedio Yamagata	Tokyo
14:00 JST (UTC+9)	Kawamura (yellow card) 52'; Kitajima 81' (pen.)	Report	Yamada 4'; Yoshioka (yellow card) 63'; Fujimoto 69'; Issaka (yellow card) 72'; Yoshida (yellow card) 80'; Tiago Alves (yellow card) 90+6'	Stadium: Ajinomoto Stadium

3 May 2023 13	Tokyo Verdy	0–0	Júbilo Iwata	Tokyo
17:00 JST (UTC+9)	Kato (yellow card) 9'	Report	Uehara (yellow card) 35'; Dudu Pacheco (yellow card) 73'; Germain (yellow card) 79'	Stadium: Ajinomoto Stadium; Attendance: 14,702; Referee: Keisuke Nobori

13 May 2023 15	Tokyo Verdy	0–1	Machida Zelvia	Tokyo
15:00 JST (UTC+9)		Report	Erik 45+1'	Stadium: Ajinomoto Stadium; Attendance: 7,477; Referee: Reo Tanaka

=== Emperor's Cup ===
7 June Match 54	Tokyo Verdy (2)	2–1	(2) Thespakusatsu Gunma	Kita
18:30 JST	Yamada 44'; Own goal 83'	Report; Report	Nishitani 36' (o.g.)	Stadium: Ajinomoto Field Nishigaoka; Attendance: 1,901; Referee: Tatsuya Sakai

12 July 2023 Third round	FC Tokyo (1)	1–1 (a.e.t.) (9–8 p)	(2) Tokyo Verdy	Tokyo
19:00 JST (UTC+9)	Tsukagawa 20'	Report	Shirai 70'	Stadium: Ajinomoto Stadium; Attendance: 17,497; Referee: Futoshi Nakamura
	Penalties
	Matsuki (penalty scored); Kimoto (penalty scored); Tsukagawa (penalty scored); Kumata (penalty scored); Nagatomo (penalty scored); Abe (penalty scored); Terayama (penalty scored); Koizumi (penalty scored); Higashi (penalty scored)		(penalty scored) Kitajima; (penalty scored) Koike; (penalty scored) Sagawa; (penalty scored) Yamakoshi; (penalty scored) Narawa; (penalty scored) Nishitani; (penalty scored) Tsunashima; (penalty scored) Shirai; (penalty missed) Chida

== See also ==
- History of Tokyo Verdy
