= 2016 All Japan High School Soccer Tournament =

Tournament details
- Country: Japan
- Dates: 30 December 2016 – 9 January 2017
- Teams: 48

Final positions
- Champions: Aomori Yamada High School (1st title)
- Runner-up: Maebashi Ikuei High School

Tournament statistics
- Top goal scorer(s): Akito Narumi (Aomori Yamada, 6 goals)

The 2016 All Japan High School Soccer Tournament (All Japan JFA 95th High School Soccer Tournament (Japanese: 第95回全国高等学校サッカー選手権大会) marked the 95th edition of the referred annually contested cup for High Schools over Japan.

== Calendar ==
Round	Date	Matches	Teams
First round	30–31 December 2016	16	32 (32) → 16
Second round	2 January 2017	16	32 (16+16) → 16
Third round	3 January 2017	8	16 → 8
Quarter-finals	5 January 2017	4	8 → 4
Semi-finals	7 January 2017	2	4 → 2
Final	9 January 2017	1	2 → 1

== Venues ==
The tournament was played in four prefectures and nine stadiums, with six (two for each prefecture) located in Chiba, Kanagawa, and Tokyo Prefectures, and three located in Saitama. They are:

- Tokyo – Ajinomoto Field Nishigaoka, and Komazawa Olympic Park Stadium
- Saitama – Saitama Stadium 2002, Urawa Komaba Stadium and NACK5 Stadium Omiya
- Kanagawa – NHK Spring Mitsuzawa Football Stadium and Kawasaki Todoroki Stadium
- Chiba – Fukuda Denshi Arena and Kashiwanoha Stadium

== Participating clubs ==
In parentheses: the amount of times each team qualified for the All Japan High School Tournament (appearance in the 2016 edition included)

Hokkaido: Asahikawa Jitsugyo High School (5); Aomori: Aomori Yamada High School (22); Iwate: Tono High School (26); Akita: Akita Shogyo High School (42); Miyagi: Seiwa Gakuen High School (4); Yamagata: Yamagata Chuo High School (11); Fukushima: Shoshi High School (8); Ibaraki: Kashima Gakuen High School (8); Tochigi: Sano Nihon Univ. High School (8); Gunma: Maebashi Ikuei High School (20); Saitama: Shochi Fukaya High School (3); Chiba: Ichiritsu Funabashi High School (21); Tokyo A: Komazawa Univ. High School (3); Tokyo B: Kanto Daiichi High School (1); Kanagawa: Toko Gakuen High School (10); Niigata: Teikyo Nagaoka High School (5); Nagano: Sozo Gakuen High School (2); Yamanashi: Yamanashi Gakuin High School (5); Toyama: Toyama Daiichi High School (27); Ishikawa: Otori Gakuen High School (1); Fukui: Hokuriku High School (4); Gifu: Chukyo High School (1); Shizuoka: Fujieda Meisei High School (2); Aichi: Toho High School (5)	Mie: Kaisei High School (1); Shiga: Yasu High School (10); Kyoto: Kyoto Tachibana High School (6); Osaka: Tokai Univ. Osaka Gyosei High School (5); Hyōgo: Takigawa Daini High School (19); Nara: Ichijo High School (7); Wakayama: Wakayama Kita High School (10); Tottori: Yonago Kita High School (12); Shimane: Rissho Univ. Shonan High School (15); Okayama: Okayama Gakugeikan High School (1); Hiroshima: Hiroshima Minami High School (13); Yamaguchi: Takagawa Gakuen High School (23); Tokushima: Tokushima Ichiritsu High School (15); Kagawa: Takamatsu Shogyo High School (22); Ehime: Matsuyama Kita High School (5); Kōchi: Meitoku Gijuku High School (7); Fukuoka: Higashi Fukuoka High School (18); Saga: Saga Higashi High School (9); Nagasaki: Nagasaki IAS High School (4); Kumamoto: Luther Gakuin High School (4); Ōita: Oita High School (9); Miyazaki: Hosho High School (13); Kagoshima: Kagoshima Josei High School (7); Okinawa: Naha Nishi High School (15)

== Schedule ==
=== First round ===
30 December 2016 Match 1	Kanto Daiichi	1–0	Yasu	Setagaya
14:05	Daisuke Tomiyama 61'	Report (JFA); Report (JFA)		Stadium: Komazawa Olympic Park Stadium

31 December 2016 Match 2	Hokuriku	0–1	Kagoshima Josei	Kawasaki
12:05		Report (JFA); Report (JFA)	Mizuki Owaki 6'	Stadium: Kawasaki Todoroki Stadium

31 December 2016 Match 3	Toko Gakuen	0–2	Nagasaki IAS	Kawasaki
12:05		Report (JFA); Report (JFA)	Kakeru Migita 7'; Takaya Yakushinji 69'	Stadium: Kawasaki Todoroki Stadium

31 December 2016 Match 4	Kashima Gakuen	2–1	Takagawa Gakuen	Yokohama
12:05	Ayase Ueda 70', 77'	Report (JFA); Report (JFA)	Tatsuki Asano 63'	Stadium: NHK Spring Mitsuzawa Football Stadium

31 December 2016 Match 5	Fujieda Meisei	1–2	Tokai Gyosei	Yokohama
14:10	Keito Nakamichi 48'	Report (JFA); Report (JFA)	Own goal 23'; Shuji Matsui 49'	Stadium: NHK Spring Mitsuzawa Football Stadium

31 December 2016 Match 6	Shochi Fukaya	2–1	Rissho Shonan	Saitama
12:05	Hotaka Tajima 47'; Haruki Koyama 50'	Report (JFA); Report (JFA)	Tsubasa Umeki 37'	Stadium: NACK5 Stadium Omiya

31 December 2016 Match 7	Seiwa Gakuen	2–0	Seiryo	Saitama
12:05	Ryoya Fujii 75'; Hayata Nishibori 78'	Report (JFA); Report (JFA)		Stadium: Urawa Komaba Stadium

31 December 2016 Match 8	Teikyo Nagaoka	1–1 (4–5 p)	Tokushima Ichiritsu	Saitama
14:10	Yuma Suyama 44'	Report (JFA); Report (JFA)	Kohei Koori 46'	Stadium: Urawa Komaba Stadium

31 December 2016 Match 9	Chukyo	1–4	Oita	Kashiwa
14:10	Ryotaro Akahori 2'	Report (JFA); Report (JFA)	Teruhiko Yamamoto 14'; Shota Shimazu 21'; Ryosuke Nagamatsu 34'; Shuto Kawasaki 79'	Stadium: Kashiwanoha Stadium

31 December 2016 Match 10	Akita Shogyo	0–2	Takigawa Daini	Kashiwa
12:05		Report (JFA); Report (JFA)	Yuya Yamada 9'; Shusaku Honda 30'	Stadium: Kashiwanoha Stadium

31 December 2016 Match 11	Ichiritsu Funabashi	1–0	Kyoto Tachibana	Chiba
12:05	Danto Sugiyama 66'	Report (JFA); Report (JFA)		Stadium: Fukuda Denshi Arena

31 December 2016 Match 12	Maebashi Ikuei	3–0	Meitoku Gijuku	Chiba
14:10	Riku Iijima 39'; Takuya Baba 53', 58'	Report (JFA); Report (JFA)		Stadium: Fukuda Denshi Arena

31 December 2016 Match 13	Asahikawa Jitsugyo	0–3	Yonago Kita	Saitama
14:10		Report (JFA); Report (JFA)	Koki Yamamuro 4'; Ryusei Ito 8', 40+1'	Stadium: NACK5 Stadium Omiya

31 December 2016 Match 14	Sano Nihon	1–0	Wakayama Kita	Kita
12:05	Tatsuya Nagasaki 6'	Report (JFA); Report (JFA)		Stadium: Ajinomoto Field Nishigaoka

31 December 2016 Match 15	Yamanashi Gakuin	1–0	Okayama Gakugeikan	Setagaya
12:05	Own goal 42'	Report (JFA); Report (JFA)		Stadium: Komazawa Olympic Park Stadium

31 December 2016 Match 16	Shoshi	4–2	Luther Gakuin	Setagaya
14:10	Kohei Watabe 12', 69'; Masaya Shindo 45'; Mafuyu Inoue 63'	Report (JFA); Report (JFA)	Reiya Tanimoto 27'; Hiroki Nagata 36'	Stadium: Komazawa Olympic Park Stadium

=== Second round ===
2 January 2017 Match 17	Higashi Fukuoka	1–0	Toho	Kawasaki
14:10	Kazuki Fujii 56'	Report (JFA); Report (JFA)		Stadium: Kawasaki Todoroki Stadium

2 January 2017 Match 18	Kagoshima Josei	0–0 (4–2 p)	Nagasaki IAS	Kawasaki
12:05		Report (JFA); Report (JFA)		Stadium: Kawasaki Todoroki Stadium

2 January 2017 Match 19	Kashima Gakuen	0–1	Tokai Gyosei	Yokohama
12:05		Report (JFA); Report (JFA)	Ryutaro Mino 80'	Stadium: NHK Spring Mitsuzawa Football Stadium

2 January 2017 Match 20	Toyama Daiichi	4–1	Naha Nishi	Yokohama
14:10	Own goal 7' (o.g.); Keita Kuboki 24'; Hiro Kimura 34'; Futa Matsumoto 54'	Report (JFA); Report (JFA)	Makito Uehara 77'	Stadium: NHK Spring Mitsuzawa Football Stadium

2 January 2017 Match 21	Sozo Gakuen	1–1 (4–2 p)	Hiroshima Minami	Saitama
14:10	Kodai Mori 80+2'	Report (JFA); Report (JFA)	Atsushi Fujii 16'	Stadium: Urawa Komaba Stadium

2 January 2017 Match 22	Kanto Daiichi	1–2	Shochi Fukaya	Saitama
12:05	Kenta Hayashi 10'	Report (JFA); Report (JFA)	Yuya Kaneko 79'; Haruki Koyama 80+3'	Stadium: Urawa Komaba Stadium

2 January 2017 Match 23	Seiwa Gakuen	1–1 (4–2 p)	Tokushima Ichiritsu	Saitama
14:10	Ryuto Oyagi 61'	Report (JFA); Report (JFA)	Kohei Koori 65'	Stadium: NACK5 Stadium Omiya

2 January 2017 Match 24	Hosho	0–5	Aomori Yamada	Saitama
14:10		Report (JFA); Report (JFA)	Issei Takahashi 7'; Akito Narumi 23'; Yuta Goke 31', 68'; Riku Saga 48'	Stadium: NACK5 Stadium Omiya

2 January 2017 Match 25	Otori Gakuen	0–4	Saga Higashi	Kashiwa
12:05		Report (JFA); Report (JFA)	Tomoki Nakazato 47', 55'; Rintaro Matsuda 76'; Yuki Nagata 80+3'	Stadium: Kashiwanoha Stadium

2 January 2017 Match 26	Oita	0–6	Takigawa Daini	Kashiwa
14:10		Report (JFA); Report (JFA)	Yuki Imai 3'; Hayate Eguchi 39'; Jotaro Inada 69'; Daiki Mizota 74', 79'; Koki Jingu 80+2'	Stadium: Kashiwanoha Stadium

2 January 2017 Match 27	Ichiritsu Funabashi	0–0 (3–5 p)	Maebashi Ikuei	Chiba
12:05		Report (JFA); Report (JFA)		Stadium: Fukuda Denshi Arena

2 January 2017 Match 28	Tono	2–0	Matsuyama Kita	Chiba
14:10	Ryota Abe 32'; Takumi Sasaki 35'	Report (JFA); Report (JFA)		Stadium: Fukuda Denshi Arena

2 January 2017 Match 29	Yamagata Chuo	0–1	Ichijo	Kita
12:05		Report (JFA); Report (JFA)	Kohei Umemoto 35'	Stadium: Ajinomoto Field Nishigaoka

2 January 2017 Match 30	Yonago Kita	0–1	Sano Nihon	Kita
14:10		Report (JFA); Report (JFA)	Own goal 62' (o.g.)	Stadium: Ajinomoto Field Nishigaoka

2 January 2017 Match 31	Yamanashi Gakuin	2–1	Shoshi	Setagaya
14:10	Jumma Miyazaki 54'; Tomoya Kobayashi 66'	Report (JFA); Report (JFA)	Takeru Kano 47'	Stadium: Komazawa Olympic Park Stadium

2 January 2017 Match 32	Takamatsu Shogyo	0–1	Komazawa	Setagaya
12:05		Report (JFA); Report (JFA)	Taisei Yoneda 57'	Stadium: Komazawa Olympic Park Stadium

=== Round of 16 ===
3 January 2017 Match 33	Higashi Fukuoka	3–0	Kagoshima Josei	Kawasaki
12:05	Kazuki Fujii 2'; Shohei Hamada 76'; Ryoga Sato 80+4'	Report (JFA); Report (JFA)		Stadium: Kawasaki Todoroki Stadium

3 January 2017 Match 34	Tokai Gyosei	2–0	Toyama Daiichi	Kawasaki
14:10	Hayato Niiho 9'; Shuji Matsui 66'	Report (JFA); Report (JFA)		Stadium: Kawasaki Todoroki Stadium

3 January 2017 Match 35	Sozo Gakuen	0–3	Shochi Fukaya	Saitama
12:05		Report (JFA); Report (JFA)	Ryota Suzuki 19'; Haruki Koyama 40+1'; Yukihito Kajiya 80'	Stadium: Urawa Komaba Stadium

3 January 2017 Match 36	Seiwa Gakuen	0–5	Aomori Yamada	Saitama
14:10		Report (JFA); Report (JFA)	Issei Takahashi 32'; Riku Saga 35'; Akito Narumi 40+1', 48'; Own goal 67' (o.g.)	Stadium: Urawa Komaba Stadium

3 January 2017 Match 37	Saga Higashi	0–5	Takigawa Daini	Chiba
14:10		Report (JFA); Report (JFA)	Yuya Yamada 2'; Ryu Tsujimoto 19'; Daiki Mizota 53'; Tsubasa Nakamori 67'; Kyota Mochii 78'	Stadium: Fukuda Denshi Arena

3 January 2017 Match 38	Maebashi Ikuei	1–0	Tono	Chiba
12:05	Ryotaro Tsunoda 2'	Report (JFA); Report (JFA)		Stadium: Fukuda Denshi Arena

3 January 2017 Match 39	Ichijo	2–2 (3–4 p)	Sano Nihon	Setagaya
14:10	Yuki Kamo 27', 79'	Report (JFA); Report (JFA)	Ryo Umezawa 18'; Keita Okuma 40'	Stadium: Komazawa Olympic Park Stadium

3 January 2017 Match 40	Yamanashi Gakuin	0–4	Komazawa	Setagaya
12:05		Report (JFA); Report (JFA)	Satoshi Murakami 7'; Kazuki Yazaki 17'; Naoya Nishida 19'; Isamu Takahashi 52'	Stadium: Komazawa Olympic Park Stadium

=== Quarter-finals ===
5 January 2017 Match 41	Higashi Fukuoka	0–1	Tokai Gyosei	Kawasaki
12:05		Report (JFA); Report (JFA)	Jumpei Yoshida 66'	Stadium: Kawasaki Todoroki Stadium; Attendance: 6,353; Referee: Kenshi Uda

5 January 2017 Match 42	Shochi Fukaya	1–3	Aomori Yamada	Kawasaki
14:10	Takayuki Tamura 43'	Report (JFA); Report (JFA)	Akito Narumi 13'; Issei Takahashi 53'; Own goal 61' (o.g.)	Stadium: Kawasaki Todoroki Stadium; Attendance: 10,089; Referee: Hiroki Kasahara

5 January 2017 Match 43	Takigawa Daini	0–2	Maebashi Ikuei	Chiba
14:10		Report (JFA); Report (JFA)	Koki Nagasawa 22'; Daichi Hitomi 77'	Stadium: Fukuda Denshi Arena; Attendance: 4,985; Referee: Genki Tawara

5 January 2017 Match 44	Sano Nihon	2–1	Komazawa	Chiba
12:05	Ryo Umezawa 66'; Tatsuya Nagasaki 80+2'	Report (JFA); Report (JFA)	Taisei Yoneda 62'	Stadium: Fukuda Denshi Arena; Attendance: 4,532; Referee: Dai Matsumoto

=== Semi-finals ===
7 January 2017 Match 45	Tokai Gyosei	1–2	Aomori Yamada	Saitama
12:05	Shuji Matsui 26'	Report (JFA); Report (JFA)	SteviaEgbus Mikuni 23'; Issei Takahashi 41'	Stadium: Saitama Stadium 2002; Attendance: 16,456; Referee: Shu Kawamata

7 January 2017 Match 46	Maebashi Ikuei	1–0	Sano Nihon	Saitama
14:20	Hayate Takazawa 30'	Report (JFA); Report (JFA)		Stadium: Saitama Stadium 2002; Attendance: 23,541; Referee: Masaki Tsuruoka

=== Final ===
9 January 2017
14:05

Aomori Yamada	5−0	Maebashi Ikuei
Issei Takahashi 23'; Riku Saga 45+1'; Akito Narumi 57', 59'; Kai Sasaki 89'	Report (JFA); Report (JFA)

Saitama Stadium 2002, Saitama
Attendance: 41,959
Referee: Yusuke Araki

GK	1	(Japan) Riku Hirosue
DF	3	(Japan) Arata Koyama
DF	4	(Japan) Kyosuke Hashimoto
DF	5	(Japan) KennedyEgbus Mikuni
DF	13	(Japan) Shinichiro Osanai	(substituted off) 90+2'
MF	6	(Japan) Kakeru Suminaga (c)
MF	7	(Japan) Yuta Goke
MF	8	(Japan) Riku Saga	(substituted off) 61'
MF	10	(Japan) Issei Takahashi
MF	14	(Japan) Takaaki Sumikawa	(substituted off) 82'
FW	11	(Japan) Akito Narumi	(substituted off) 86'
Substitutes:
GK	12	(Japan) Ayumu Tsubo
DF	2	(Japan) Masato Kudo	(substituted in) 90+2'
DF	15	(Japan) Taiki Amagasa
DF	19	(Japan) Keiji Kagiyama
DF	20	(Japan) Takumi Sato
MF	16	(Japan) Shuto Hori	(substituted in) 82'
MF	17	(Japan) Yu Sasaki
MF	18	(Japan) Riku Danzaki	(substituted in) 61'
FW	9	(Japan) Kai Sasaki	(substituted in) 86'
Manager:
(Japan) Go Kuroda

GK	1	(Japan) Akira Tsukida
DF	3	(Japan) Ryotaro Tsunoda
DF	4	(Japan) Riku Matsuda
DF	15	(Japan) Taiki Watanabe
DF	19	(Japan) Koki Gotoda	(substituted off) 64'
MF	6	(Japan) Koki Nagasawa	(substituted off) 84'
MF	7	(Japan) Ryo Otsuka (c)
MF	9	(Japan) Hayate Takazawa
MF	25	(Japan) Yu Tabei	(substituted off) 53'
FW	10	(Japan) Riku Iijima	(substituted off) 74'
FW	24	(Japan) Daichi Hitomi
Substitutes:
GK	12	(Japan) Shun Matsumoto
DF	2	(Japan) Sho Oyama	(substituted in) 64'
DF	4	(Japan) Yuta Asaga
DF	16	(Japan) Ren Kaneda
MF	8	(Japan) Ryo Tabei	(substituted in) 74'
MF	11	(Japan) Wataru Iwashita	(substituted in) 53'
MF	14	(Japan) Hayato Shiozawa
MF	22	(Japan) Renya Yashiro
FW	18	(Japan) Takuya Baba	(substituted in) 84'
Manager:
(Japan) Kosuke Yamada

Assistant referees:
Tomohisa Gonda
Yukitaka Kumagai
Fourth official:
Tomohiro Tsukada

Match rules

- 90 minutes.
- Extra-time of 10 minutes for each half if scores still level.
- Persisting a draw after extra-time, a penalty shoot-out would be held.
- Nine named substitutes.
- Maximum of five substitutions.

== Top scorers ==
Rank	Player	High School	Goals
1	(Japan) Akito Narumi	Aomori Yamada	6
2	(Japan) Issei Takahashi	Aomori Yamada	5
3	(Japan) Haruki Koyama	Shochi Fukaya	3
3	(Japan) Shuji Matsui	Tokai Gyosei	3
3	(Japan) Daiki Mizota	Takagawa Gakuen	3
3	(Japan) Riku Saga	Aomori Yamada	3
