= Go Kuroda =

Japanese football manager

Go Kuroda 黒田 剛
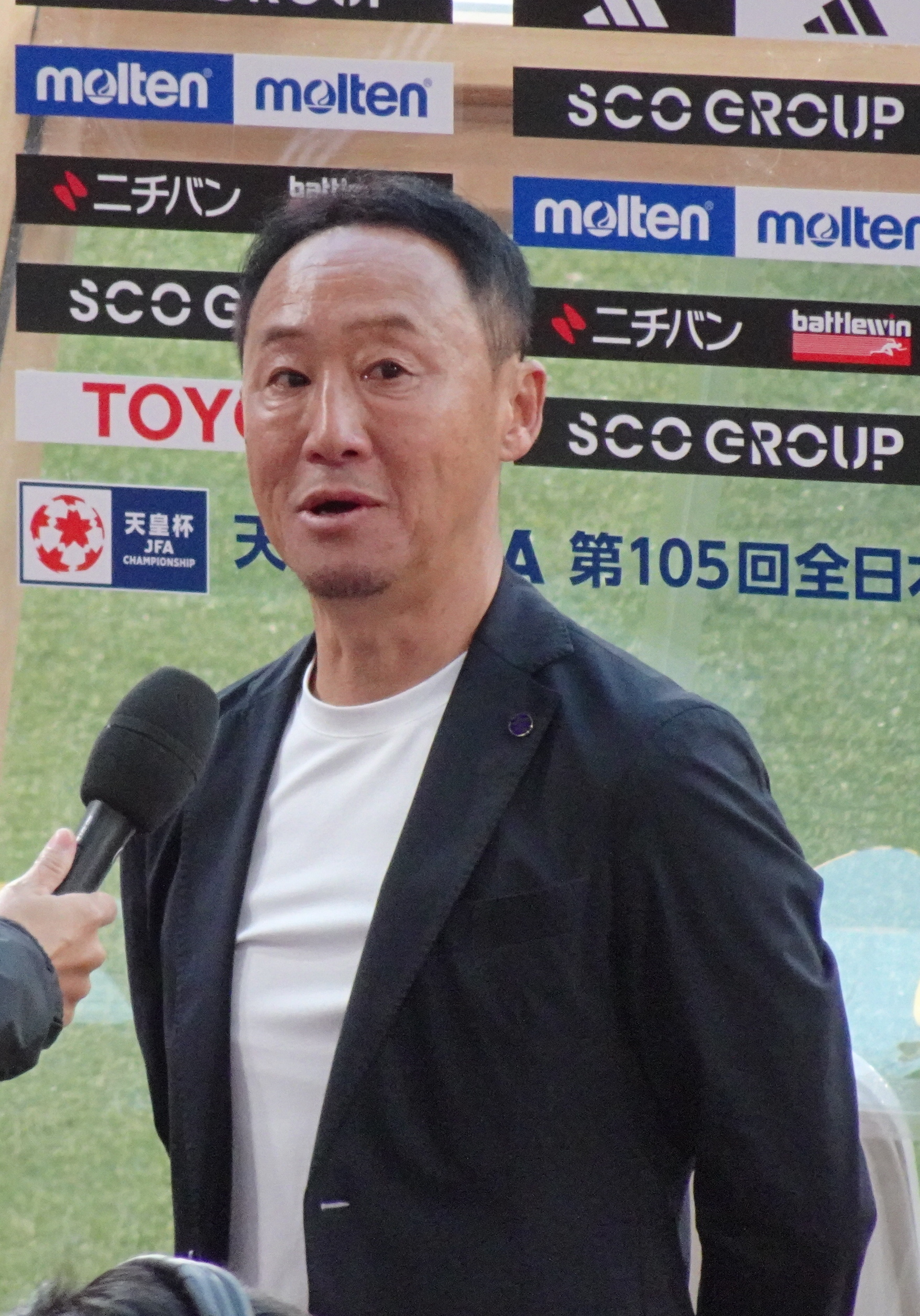
- Kuroda at the 2025 Emperor's Cup final

Personal information
- Full name: Go Kuroda
- Date of birth: 26 May 1970 (age 56)
- Place of birth: Sapporo, Hokkaido, Japan

Team information
- Current team: Machida Zelvia (manager)

Youth career
- 1986–1988: Noboribetsu Otani High School

College career
| Years | Team | Apps | (Gls) |
| 1989–1992 | Osaka University of Health and Sport Sciences | | |

Managerial career
- 1994–2022: Aomori Yamada High School
- 2022–: Machida Zelvia

Go Kuroda (黒田 剛, Kuroda Go; born 26 May 1970) is a Japanese football manager and former player who is the manager of J1 League club Machida Zelvia.

== Managerial career ==
=== Aomori Yamada High School ===
After graduating Osaka University of Health and Sport Sciences, in 1994 he was hired as an employee of Aomori Yamada High School and coached the school's football team. The following year, aged 25, he became manager of the team. Being based in the snowy north of the country, with poor training facilities and having no managerial experience, Kuroda was faced with many challenges at the start of his career. However, it wasn't too long before he was able to improve the school's team and going forward they appeared in every National High School Soccer Championship since 1997. In 2000, they advanced to the top four in the high school championships and became the first team from Aomori Prefecture to play at the National Stadium. In 2005, Kuroda won his first trophy when Aomori Yamada won the National High School Comprehensive Athletic Tournament Soccer Tournament. Kuroda obtained his JFA certified S-Class coaching license in 2006, allowing him to coach in the J.League.

He continued to build Aomori Yamada into one of the best high school football teams in the country. In 2009, they finished runners-up in the All Japan High School Soccer Tournament, with Kuroda coaching future Japan national team player Gaku Shibasaki. In 2011 they became part of the reformed Prince Takamado Cup competition, competing alongside the best J.League U-18 teams. They won the competition in 2016, beating Sanfrecce Hiroshima U-18s in the final on penalties. They also won the 2016 All Japan High School Soccer Tournament in a convincing 5–0 victory in the final against Maebashi Ikuei. Their success continued with Kuroda at the helm – they appeared in four of the next five All Japan High School Soccer Tournament finals, winning in both 2018 and 2021. They also won the Prince Takamodo Cup in 2019 and 2022.

=== Machida Zelvia ===
In 2022, after winning the Aomori High School Championship and qualifying for the national tournament for 26 consecutive years, it was announced that Kuroda would be stepping down as manager of the high school team and joining J2 League club FC Machida Zelvia for the 2023 season. He would be replacing Ranko Popović who finished 15th with the club in the 2022 season.

The season started incredibly well for Kuroda and his new club, winning six and drawing one of his first seven games in charge and taking Machida straight to the top of the league table. For this, Kuroda won the first J2 Manager of the Month award. By the end of May, Machida Zelvia were cemented at the top of the table, eight points clear of their nearest challengers and for a month of four wins and two draws, Kuroda was once again awarded the Manager of the Month award. As well as their dominant league form, they also managed an Emperor's Cup upset, defeating defending J1 League champions Yokohama F. Marinos in a 4–1 third-round match. In October, the club clinched promotion with a win over Roasso Kumamoto and confirmed their status as league champions in the following week. Kuroda had won the league in his first season as a professional football manager and would be managing at the highest level in Japanese football in 2024.

Of the club's promotion, Kuroda said "There were many who worried that this team couldn't win in my first pro year. They took the words of a first-year manager to heart ... and stuck with me without a single complaint. I have nothing but gratitude for the players."

Following promotion, in October 2023 Kuroda renewed his contract with Machida Zelvia for another season.

After an unbeaten start to their first season in the top flight with 4 wins and a draw, Kuroda was awarded the Manager of the Month award for February/March 2024. Kuroda led Machida Zelvia to a third-place finish in their debut top-flight season, where they also qualified for the 2025–26 AFC Champions League Elite.

On 16 September 2025, Kuroda managed in his first continental match in a 1–1 draw with K League 1 club FC Seoul. He secured his first continental victory in October against Chinese Super League club Shanghai Port.

On 22 November 2025, Kuroda led Machida Zelvia to the 2025 Emperor's Cup for the first time in their history after defeating Vissel Kobe 3–1 in the final.

Later that month, Kuroda renewed his contract with the club for the following season.

== Personal life ==
Kuroda is married and has two children, a son and a daughter.

== Controversies ==
=== Accusations of power harassment ===
In April 2025, it was reported that members of Kuroda's staff had filed complaints against him, accused of power harassment. The allegations included publicly berating coaches in front of players, removing a goalkeeper coach from the bench following a conceded goal, and pressuring staff members over work responsibilities. His behaviour had also been reported in an annual survey conducted by the Japan Professional Football Players Association. In response, Machida Zelvia organised an investigation into the matter, which concluded that although some the facts were confirmed, they did not amount to power harassment. However, the J.League conducted its own investigation and in December 2025 issued a written reprimand to both Kuroda and the club. The league criticised the club for deficiencies in its investigation and internal controls, noting that the initial investigation's handling had made team personnel hesitant to speak frankly.

== Managerial statistics ==
As of match played 6 June 2026

Managerial record by team and tenure
| Team | Nat. | From | To | Record | | | | | | | | Ref. |
| Team | Nat. | From | To | G | W | D | L | GF | GA | GD | Win % | Ref. |
|---|---|---|---|---|---|---|---|---|---|---|---|---|
| Machida Zelvia | (Japan) | 25 October 2022 | Present | 169 | 92 | 42 | 35 | 264 | 155 | +109 | 54.44 | |
| Career Total | | | | 169 | 92 | 42 | 35 | 264 | 155 | +109 | 54.44 | |

== Honours ==
=== Youth ===
Aomori Yamada High School

- National High School Comprehensive Athletic Tournament Soccer Tournament: 2005
- All Japan High School Soccer Tournament: 2016, 2018, 2021
- Prince Takamado Cup: 2016, 2019, 2022

=== Club ===
Machida Zelvia

- J2 League: 2023
- Emperor's Cup: 2025

=== Individual ===
Machida Zelvia

- J2 League Manager of the Month award: February/March 2023, May 2023
- J1 League Manager of the Month award: February/March 2024
- AFC Coach of the Year: 2026
