= Ren Katō =

Japanese footballer

Ren Katō 加藤 蓮
Personal information
- Full name: Ren Katō
- Date of birth: 28 December 1999 (age 26)
- Place of birth: Otaru, Hokkaido, Japan
- Height: 1.75 m (5 ft 9 in)
- Position: Left-back

Team information
- Current team: Kyoto Sanga
- Number: 26

Youth career
- Zenibako SSS
- –2017: Hokkaido Consadole Sapporo

College career
Years	Team	Apps	(Gls)
2018–2021	Meiji University		

Senior career*
Years	Team	Apps	(Gls)
2021–2023	Tokyo Verdy	69	(5)
2024–2026	Yokohama F. Marinos	74	(2)
2026–	Kyoto Sanga	7	(0)
- * Club domestic league appearances and goals as of 1 August 2026

Ren Katō (加藤 蓮, Katō Ren; born 28 December 1999) is a Japanese footballer who plays as a left-back for club Kyoto Sanga.

== Early life ==
Katō was born in Otaru, Hokkaido, Japan.

== Club career ==
In September 2021, while studying at the Meiji University, it was announced that Katō would sign for J2 League side Tokyo Verdy for the 2022 season. He would link up with his new team as a designated special player for the duration of the 2021 season.

Katō made his debut for Verdy against Thespakusatsu Gunma on 13 March 2022, coming on as a substitute in the 59th minute for his teammate Kohei Yamakoshi. He would score his first goal for the club in a 1–0 victory over Oita Trinita, on the 3rd of April 2022, scoring in the 42nd minute.

Katō made 40 appearances for Verdy in the 2023 J2 League season, helping them gain promotion to the top-flight through the play-offs.

In December 2023, it was announced that Katō would be moving to J1 League club Yokohama F. Marinos for the 2024 season.

After three seasons with Yokohama F. Marinos, Katō transferred to Kyoto Sanga FC ahead of the 2026–27 J1 League season.

== Career statistics ==
=== Club ===
As of 14 October 2026.

Appearances and goals by club, season and competition
Club	Season	League			National cup (Note: Includes Emperor's Cup)		League cup (Note: Includes J.League Cup)		Continental		Other		Total	
Club	Season	Division	Apps	Goals	Apps	Goals	Apps	Goals	Apps	Goals	Apps	Goals	Apps	Goals
Tokyo Verdy	2022	J2 League	30	3	1	0	–		–		0	0	31	3
Tokyo Verdy	2023	J2 League	39	2	0	0	–		–		1 (Note: Appearance in J1/J2 play-offs)	0	40	2
Tokyo Verdy	Total		69	5	1	0	0	0	0	0	1	0	71	5
Yokohama F. Marinos	2024	J1 League	27	1	5	0	1	0	7 (Note: Appearances in AFC Champions League Elite)	0	–		36	1
Yokohama F. Marinos	2025	J1 League	27	0	1	0	2	0	0	0	–		30	0
Yokohama F. Marinos	2026	J1 (100)	20	1	–		–		0	0	–		20	1
Yokohama F. Marinos	Total		74	2	6	0	3	0	7	0	0	0	90	2
Kyoto Sanga	2026–27	J1 League	7	0	1	0	1	0	2	0	–		11	0
Career total			150	7	8	0	4	0	9	0	1	0	172	7
