= Tomoki Ueda =

Japanese footballer

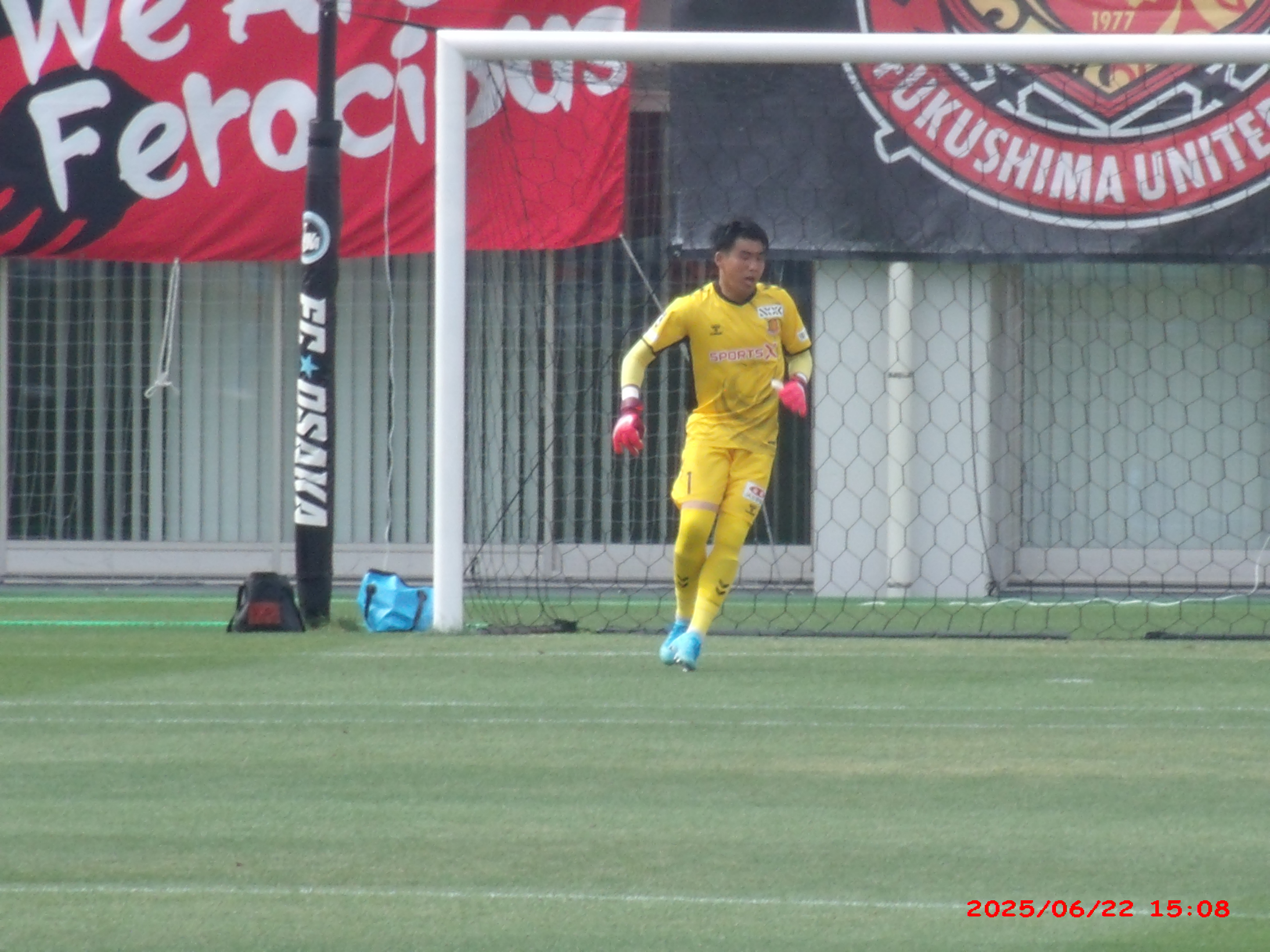

Personal information
- Date of birth: 3 March 1996 (age 30)
- Place of birth: Uda, Nara, Japan
- Height: 1.80 m (5 ft 11 in)
- Position: Goalkeeper

Team information
- Current team: Fukushima United
- Number: 1

Youth career
- –2013: Kyoto Sanga

College career
Years	Team	Apps	(Gls)
2014–2017	Kwansei Gakuin University		

Senior career*
Years	Team	Apps	(Gls)
2014	Kyoto Sanga	0	(0)
2018–2020	Nara Club	13	(0)
2021–2022	Omiya Ardija	2	(0)
2023	Fujieda MYFC	16	(0)
2024	FC Gifu	9	(0)
2025–	Fukushima United	30	(0)
- * Club domestic league appearances and goals as of 25 August 2026

Tomoki Ueda (上田 智輝, Ueda Tomoki; born 3 March 1996) is a Japanese footballer who plays as a goalkeeper for J3 League club Fukushima United.

== Career statistics ==
As of 1 March 2021.

Club	Season	League			National Cup		League Cup		Other		Total	
Club	Season	Division	Apps	Goals	Apps	Goals	Apps	Goals	Apps	Goals	Apps	Goals
Kyoto Sanga	2014	J2 League	0	0	0	0	0	0	0	0	0	0
Kwansei Gakuin University	2016	–			2 (Note: Appearances in the Emperor's Cup)	0	–		0	0	2	0
Nara Club	2018	JFL	0	0	1	0	–		0	0	1	0
Nara Club	2019	JFL	0	0	1	0	–		0	0	1	0
Nara Club	2020	JFL	11	0	2	0	–		0	0	13	0
Nara Club	Total		11	0	4	0	0	0	0	0	15	0
Omiya Ardija	2021	J2 League	1	0	0	0	0	0	0	0	1	0
Career total			12	0	6	0	0	0	0	0	18	0
