= Ryo Shiohama =

Japanese footballer

Ryo Shiohama 塩浜 遼
Personal information
- Full name: Ryo Shiohama
- Date of birth: May 7, 2000 (age 26)
- Place of birth: Shiga, Japan
- Height: 1.70 m (5 ft 7 in)
- Position: Forward

Team information
- Current team: Sagan Tosu
- Number: 11

Youth career
- 2013–2015: Shizuoka Gakuen Junior High School
- 2016–2018: Shizuoka Gakuen High School

College career
Years	Team	Apps	(Gls)
2019–2023	Juntendo University		

Senior career*
Years	Team	Apps	(Gls)
2023–2024	Fukushima United	75	(21)
2025	Roasso Kumamoto	37	(10)
2026–	Sagan Tosu	16	(3)
- * Club domestic league appearances and goals as of 14 August 2026

Ryo Shiohama (塩浜 遼, Ryo Shiohama; born May 7, 2000) is a Japanese footballer who currently plays as a forward for Sagan Tosu.

== Club statistics ==
Updated to 4 July 2024.

Appearances and goals by club, season and competition
Club	Season	League			Emperor's Cup		J.League Cup		Total	
Club	Season	Division	Apps	Goals	Apps	Goals	Apps	Goals	Apps	Goals
Juntendo University	2021	–			1	0	–		1	0
Fukushima United	2023	J3 League	37	5	1	1	–		38	6
Fukushima United	2024	J3 League	19	7	1	0	1	0	21	7
Career total			56	12	3	1	1	0	60	13
