= Hiroshi Omori =

Japanese footballer

Hiroshi Omori 大森 博
Personal information
- Date of birth: 10 September 2002 (age 24)
- Place of birth: Tokyo, Japan
- Height: 1.86 m (6 ft 1 in)
- Position: Midfielder

Team information
- Current team: Fagiano Okayama
- Number: 6

Youth career
- –2014: Toneri SSS
- 2015–2017: Shutoku Junior High School
- 2018–2020: Shutoku High School

Senior career*
Years	Team	Apps	(Gls)
2021–2025	Tokushima Vortis	0	(0)
2022–2024	→ Fukushima United (loan)	57	(1)
2025	→ Tochigi SC (loan)	33	(0)
2026–	Fagiano Okayama	15	(1)
- * Club domestic league appearances and goals as of 12 August 2026

Hiroshi Omori (大森 博, Omori Hiroshi; born 10 September 2002) is a Japanese footballer currently playing as a midfielder for J1 League club Fagiano Okayama.

== Career ==
Hiroshi Omori played for Toneri SSS and Shutoku Junior and Senior High School during his youth. He attracted the attention of Tokushima Vortis, signing with them his first professional contract in February 2021. The club from Tokushima, a city in Tokushima Prefecture, played in the Japanese first division. At the end of 2021, he was relegated to the second division with the club without playing. In July 2022, he moved to third-division club Fukushima United FC on loan. Hiroshi Omori made his third division debut for the club from Fukushima on July 30, 2022 (matchday 19) in a home game against FC Imabari. He was substituted for Hiroki Higuchi in the 74th minute of the 1-1 draw.

== Career statistics ==
=== Club ===
As of 25 March 2026.

Appearances and goals by club, season and competition
Club	Season	League			National cup (Note: Includes Emperors Cup)		League cup (Note: Includes J.League Cup)		Other		Total	
Club	Season	Division	Apps	Goals	Apps	Goals	Apps	Goals	Apps	Goals	Apps	Goals
Tokushima Vortis	2022	J2 League	0	0	0	0	2	0	–		2	0
Fukushima United FC (loan)	2022	J3 League	12	0	0	0	0	0	0	0	12	0
Fukushima United FC (loan)	2023	J3 League	17	1	2	1	0	0	0	0	19	2
Fukushima United FC (loan)	2024	J3 League	28	0	2	0	1	0	1 (Note: Appearance in J2/J3 play-offs)	0	32	0
Fukushima United FC (loan)	Total		57	1	4	1	1	0	1	0	63	2
Tochigi SC (loan)	2025	J3 League	33	0	2	0	2	0	–		37	0
Fagiano Okayama	2026	J1 (100)	5	0	–		–		–		5	0
Career total			95	1	6	1	5	0	1	0	107	2
