= Hidetaka Maie =

Japanese footballer

Personal information
- Date of birth: 28 July 2003 (age 23)
- Place of birth: Chiba, Japan
- Height: 1.87 m (6 ft 2 in)
- Position: Striker

Team information
- Current team: FC Ryukyu (on loan from Kashiwa Reysol)
- Number: 25

Youth career
- Rabbit Kickers
- –2022: Kashiwa Reysol

Senior career*
| Years | Team | Apps | (Gls) |
| 2022– | Kashiwa Reysol | 7 | (0) |
| 2024– | → FC Ryukyu (loan) | 4 | (0) |
- * Club domestic league appearances and goals as of 28 October 2024

Hidetaka Maie (真家 英嵩, Maie Hidetaka; born 28 July 2003) is a Japanese footballer who plays as a striker for J3 League club FC Ryukyu on loan from Kashiwa Reysol.

== Career statistics ==
=== Club ===
As of 23 February 2022.

| Club | Season | League | | | National Cup | | League Cup | | Other | | Total | |
| Club | Season | Division | Apps | Goals | Apps | Goals | Apps | Goals | Apps | Goals | Apps | Goals |
|---|---|---|---|---|---|---|---|---|---|---|---|---|
| Kashiwa Reysol | 2022 | J1 League | 0 | 0 | 0 | 0 | 1 (Note: Appearances in the J.League Cup) | 1 | 0 | 0 | 1 | 1 |
| Career total | | | 0 | 0 | 0 | 0 | 1 | 1 | 0 | 0 | 1 | 1 |
