= Yuya Nagasawa =

Japanese footballer (born 1996)

Personal information
- Date of birth: 1 July 1996 (age 30)
- Place of birth: Shizuoka, Japan
- Height: 1.85 m (6 ft 1 in)
- Position: Goalkeeper

Team information
- Current team: Tokyo Verdy
- Number: 21

Youth career
- Triangle SC
- ACN Júbilo Numazu
- 2012–2014: Fujieda Higashi High School

College career
Years	Team	Apps	(Gls)
2015–2018	Meiji University		

Senior career*
Years	Team	Apps	(Gls)
2019–2021	Azul Claro Numazu	37	(0)
2021–	Tokyo Verdy	19	(0)
Medal record
Representing Japan
AFC U-16 Championship
Silver medal – second place	2012 Iran
- * Club domestic league appearances and goals as of 8 August 2026 ‡ National team caps and goals as of 11 June 2019

Yuya Nagasawa (長沢 祐弥, Nagasawa Yūya; born 1 July 1996) is a Japanese professional footballer who plays as a goalkeeper for Tokyo Verdy.

== Career statistics ==
As of matches played on 22 September 2024

Club	Season	League			Emperor's Cup		J.League Cup		Total	
Club	Season	Division	Apps	Goals	Apps	Goals	Apps	Goals	Apps	Goals
Azul Claro Numazu	2019	J3 League	5	0	—		—		5	0
Azul Claro Numazu	2020	J3 League	32	0	—		—		32	0
Azul Claro Numazu	Total		37	0	0	0	0	0	37	0
Tokyo Verdy	2021	J2 League	1	0	0	0	—		1	0
Tokyo Verdy	2022	J2 League	5	0	1	0	—		6	0
Tokyo Verdy	2023	J2 League	0	0	0	0	—		0	0
Tokyo Verdy	2024	J1 League	0	0	2	0	2	0	4	0
Tokyo Verdy	Total		6	0	3	0	2	0	11	0
Career total			43	0	3	0	2	0	48	0
