= Kai Sasaki =

Japanese footballer

Personal information
- Date of birth: 20 October 1998 (age 28)
- Place of birth: Hirosaki, Aomori, Japan
- Height: 1.79 m (5 ft 10 in)
- Position: Forward

Team information
- Current team: SC Sagamihara
- Number: 9

Youth career
- Viperu Hirosaki FC
- –2013: Libero Tsugaru SC
- 2014–2016: Aomori Yamada High School

College career
Years	Team	Apps	(Gls)
2017–2020	Niigata University HW		

Senior career*
Years	Team	Apps	(Gls)
2021–2024	Vanraure Hachinohe	89	(15)
2025	FC Gifu	21	(4)
2025	Vanraure Hachinohe	11	(1)
2026–	SC Sagamihara	21	(6)
- * Club domestic league appearances and goals as of 17 August 2026

Kai Sasaki (佐々木 快, Sasaki Kai; born 20 October 1998) is a Japanese footballer who plays as a forward for SC Sagamihara.

== Career statistics ==
=== Club ===
As of 14 March 2021.

Club	Season	League			National Cup		League Cup		Other		Total	
Club	Season	Division	Apps	Goals	Apps	Goals	Apps	Goals	Apps	Goals	Apps	Goals
Niigata University of Health and Welfare	2020	–			2 (Note: Appearances in the Emperor's Cup)	0	–		0	0	2	0
Vanraure Hachinohe	2021	J3 League	1	0	0	0	–		0	0	1	0
Career total			1	0	2	0	0	0	0	0	3	0
