= Kakeru Suminaga =

Japanese footballer (born 1998)

Personal information
- Date of birth: 6 October 1998 (age 28)
- Place of birth: Mikasa, Hokkaido, Japan
- Height: 1.71 m (5 ft 7 in)
- Position: Midfielder

Team information
- Current team: ReinMeer Aomori
- Number: 4

Youth career
- Mikasa FC
- Hokkaido Consadole Sapporo
- 2014–2016: Aomori Yamada High School

College career
Years	Team	Apps	(Gls)
2017–2020	Meiji University		

Senior career*
Years	Team	Apps	(Gls)
2021–2023	Nagano Parceiro	31	(0)
2023–	ReinMeer Aomori	0	(0)

International career^{‡}
2017	Japan U19	1	(0)
- * Club domestic league appearances and goals as of 00:19, 28 August 2023 (UTC) ‡ National team caps and goals as of 17:04, 20 March 2021 (UTC)

Kakeru Suminaga (住永 翔, Suminaga Kakeru; born 6 October 1998) is a Japanese footballer currently playing as a midfielder for ReinMeer Aomori

== Career statistics ==
=== Club ===
As of 20 March 2021.

Club	Season	League			National Cup		League Cup		Other		Total	
Club	Season	Division	Apps	Goals	Apps	Goals	Apps	Goals	Apps	Goals	Apps	Goals
Nagano Parceiro	2021	J3 League	1	0	0	0	–		0	0	1	0
Career total			1	0	0	0	0	0	0	0	1	0
