= Yuto Nagamine =

Japanese association football player

Personal information
- Date of birth: 28 March 2000 (age 26)
- Place of birth: Saitama, Japan
- Height: 1.75 m (5 ft 9 in)
- Position: Defender

Youth career
- –2014: Sakado Diplomats
- 2015–2017: Saitama Heisei High School

College career
Years	Team	Apps	(Gls)
2018–2021	Takushoku University		

Senior career*
Years	Team	Apps	(Gls)
2021–2026	Zweigen Kanazawa	100	(1)
- * Club domestic league appearances and goals as of 15:18, 30 May 2026 (UTC)

Yuto Nagamine (長峰 祐斗, Nagamine Yuto; born 28 March 2000) is a Japanese footballer who plays as a defender for Zweigen Kanazawa

== Career statistics ==
=== Club ===
As of 9 June 2021

Club	Season	League			National Cup		League Cup		Other		Total	
Club	Season	Division	Apps	Goals	Apps	Goals	Apps	Goals	Apps	Goals	Apps	Goals
Zweigen Kanazawa	2021	J2 League	2	0	0	0	0	0	0	0	2	0
Career total			2	0	0	0	0	0	0	0	2	0
