= Kyosuke Kamiyama =

Japanese footballer

Personal information
- Date of birth: 2 January 2000 (age 26)
- Place of birth: Kanagawa, Japan
- Height: 1.78 m (5 ft 10 in)
- Position: Defender

Team information
- Current team: Sagan Tosu
- Number: 3

Youth career
- Tokyu S Reyes FC
- –2017: Yokohama FC

College career
Years	Team	Apps	(Gls)
2018–2021	Toyo University		

Senior career*
Years	Team	Apps	(Gls)
2022–2026	Kataller Toyama	102	(6)
2026–	Sagan Tosu	9	(0)

International career
2015	Japan U15		
- * Club domestic league appearances and goals as of 13 August 2026

Kyosuke Kamiyama (神山 京右, Kamiyama Kyosuke; born 2 January 2000) is a Japanese footballer currently playing as a defender for Sagan Tosu.

== Club career ==
While studying at the Toyo University, Kamiyama was announced as a Kataller Toyama player ahead of the 2022 season.

== Career statistics ==
=== Club ===
As of 14 March 2022.

Club	Season	League			National Cup		League Cup		Other		Total	
Club	Season	Division	Apps	Goals	Apps	Goals	Apps	Goals	Apps	Goals	Apps	Goals
Kataller Toyama	2022	J3 League	1	0	0	0	–		0	0	1	0
Career total			1	0	0	0	0	0	0	0	1	0
