= Tatsuki Higashiyama =

Japanese footballer

Personal information
- Date of birth: 3 June 1999 (age 27)
- Place of birth: Niigata, Japan
- Height: 1.67 m (5 ft 6 in)
- Position: Midfielder

Team information
- Current team: Roasso Kumamoto
- Number: 30

Youth career
- JFC Sonoki
- –2014: Niigata FFC
- 2015–2017: Shizuoka Gakuen High School

College career
Years	Team	Apps	(Gls)
2018–2021	Shizuoka Sangyo University		

Senior career*
Years	Team	Apps	(Gls)
2022–	Roasso Kumamoto	47	(2)
- * Club domestic league appearances and goals as of 26 October 2024

Tatsuki Higashiyama (東山 達稀, Higashiyama Tatsuki; born 3 June 1999) is a Japanese footballer currently playing as a midfielder for Roasso Kumamoto.

== Career statistics ==
=== Club ===
As of 5 March 2022.

Club	Season	League			National Cup		League Cup		Other		Total	
Club	Season	Division	Apps	Goals	Apps	Goals	Apps	Goals	Apps	Goals	Apps	Goals
Roasso Kumamoto	2022	J2 League	1	0	0	0	0	0	0	0	1	0
Career total			1	0	0	0	0	0	0	0	1	0
