= Keito Kawamura =

Japanese footballer

Keito Kawamura 河村 慶人
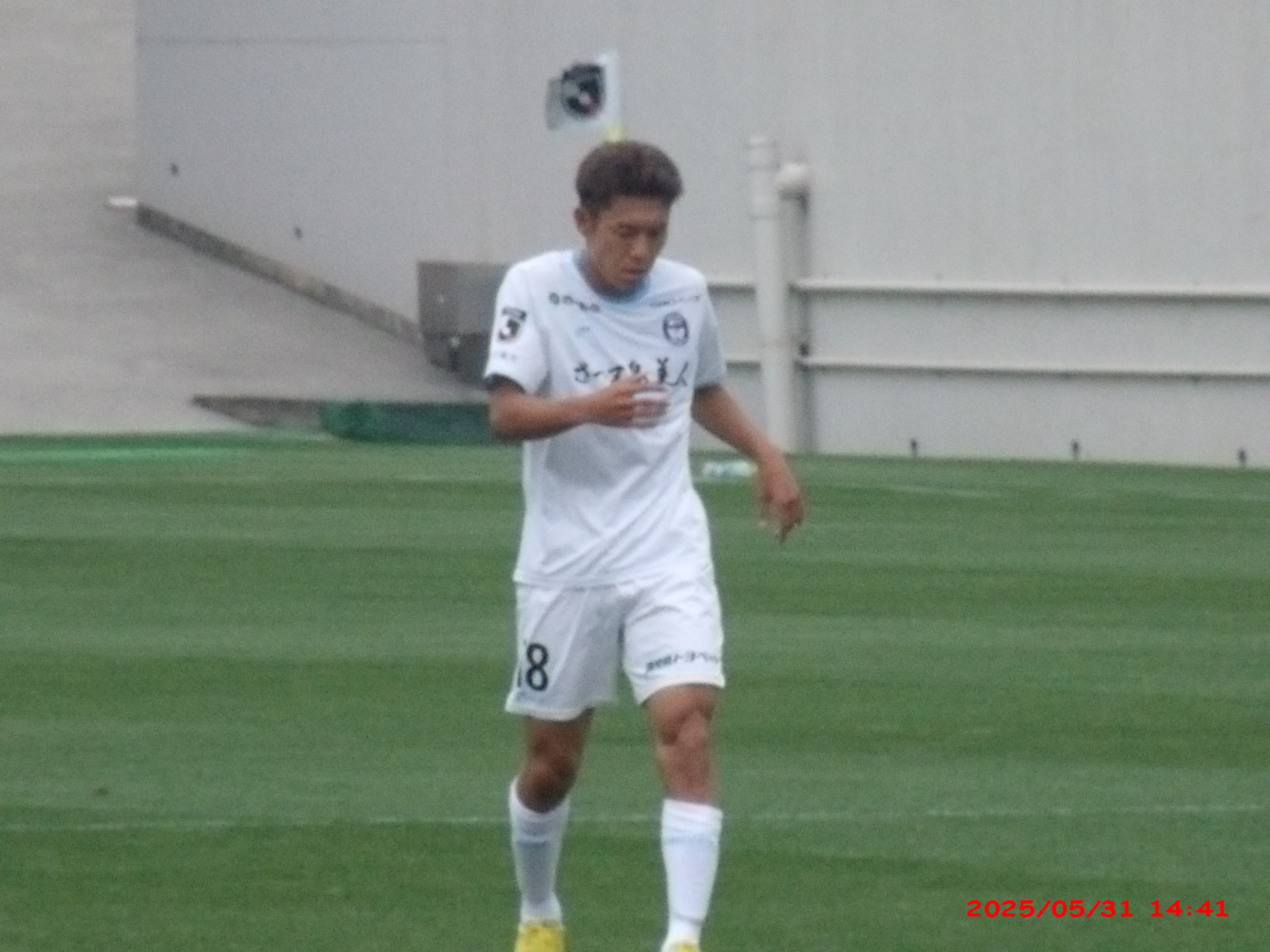

Personal information
- Full name: Keito Kawamura
- Date of birth: 11 September 1999 (age 27)
- Place of birth: Osaka, Japan
- Height: 1.74 m (5 ft 9 in)
- Position: Forward

Team information
- Current team: Kagoshima United FC
- Number: 18

Youth career
- Stay Cool FC
- Iwata FC
- 2015–2017: Kindai University High School

College career
Years	Team	Apps	(Gls)
2018–2021	Nippon Sport Science University		

Senior career*
Years	Team	Apps	(Gls)
2021–2024	Tokyo Verdy	61	(5)
2024	→ Blaublitz Akita (loan)	15	(1)
2025–	Kagoshima United FC	60	(15)
- * Club domestic league appearances and goals as of 18 August 2026

Keito Kawamura (河村 慶人, Kawamura Keito; born 11 September 1999) is a Japanese professional footballer who plays as a forward J3 League club for Kagoshima United FC.

== Early life ==
Kawamura was born in Osaka, Japan. He played youth football for Stay Cool FC, Iwata FC and Kindai University High School, and played college football Nippon Sport Science University.

== Career ==
Kawamura made his debut for Verdy on the 19 February 2022, against V-Varen Nagasaki, coming on in the 85th minute for Ryoga Sato. He scored his first goal for the club against Tochigi SC on 27 February 2022, scoring in the 76th minute.

In July 2024, Kawamura moved on loan to J2 League club Blaublitz Akita for the remainder of the season.

In December 2024, it was announced that Kawamura would be leaving Tokyo Verdy and joining J3 League club Kagoshima United FC.

== Career statistics ==
=== Club ===
As of end of 2024 season.

Appearances and goals by club, season and competition
Club	Season	League			National Cup		League Cup		Other		Total	
Club	Season	Division	Apps	Goals	Apps	Goals	Apps	Goals	Apps	Goals	Apps	Goals
Japan			League		Emperor's Cup		J. League Cup		Other		Total	
Tokyo Verdy	2021	J2 League	0	0	0	0	–		–		0	0
Tokyo Verdy	2022	J2 League	28	3	4	0	–		–		32	3
Tokyo Verdy	2023	J2 League	31	2	1	0	–		–		32	2
Tokyo Verdy	2024	J1 League	2	0	0	0	1	0	–		3	0
Tokyo Verdy	Total		61	5	5	0	1	0	0	0	67	5
Blaublitz Akita (loan)	2024	J2 League	15	1	0	0	0	0	–		15	1
Career total			76	6	5	0	1	0	0	0	82	5
