= Sachiro Toshima =

Japanese footballer

Sachiro Toshima 戸嶋 祥郎
Personal information
- Full name: Sachiro Toshima
- Date of birth: 26 September 1995 (age 31)
- Place of birth: Saitama, Japan
- Height: 1.70 m (5 ft 7 in)
- Position: Midfielder

Team information
- Current team: Kashiwa Reysol
- Number: 28

Youth career
- –2007: Tokiwa SSS
- 2008–2010: Urawa Red Diamonds
- 2011–2013: Ichiritsu Urawa High School

College career
Years	Team	Apps	(Gls)
2014–2017	University of Tsukuba		

Senior career*
Years	Team	Apps	(Gls)
2018–2019	Albirex Niigata	66	(3)
2020–	Kashiwa Reysol	137	(10)
- * Club domestic league appearances and goals as of 10 August 2026

Sachiro Toshima (戸嶋 祥郎, Toshima Sachiro; born 26 September 1995) is a Japanese footballer for Kashiwa Reysol.

== Club career ==
After attending University of Tsukuba and winning the MVP in the Kanto University Football League, Toshima joined Albirex Niigata for 2018 season.

== Career statistics ==
Updated to end of 2026 season.

Appearances and goals by club, season and competition
Club	Season	League			Emperor's Cup		J.League Cup		Total	
Club	Season	Division	Apps	Goals	Apps	Goals	Apps	Goals	Apps	Goals
Albirex Niigata	2018	J2 League	32	2	1	0	4	0	37	2
Albirex Niigata	2019	J2 League	34	1	0	0	—		34	1
Albirex Niigata	Total		66	3	1	0	4	0	71	3
Kashiwa Reysol	2020	J1 League	16	0	—		4	0	20	0
Kashiwa Reysol	2021	J1 League	19	1	1	1	0	0	20	2
Kashiwa Reysol	2022	J1 League	26	2	2	0	4	0	32	2
Kashiwa Reysol	2023	J1 League	28	3	4	2	4	0	36	5
Kashiwa Reysol	2024	J1 League	27	2	2	0	4	1	33	3
Kashiwa Reysol	2025	J1 League	13	1	1	0	9	2	23	3
Kashiwa Reysol	2026	J1 League	8	0	0	0	0	0	8	0
Kashiwa Reysol	Total		137	9	10	3	25	3	172	15
Career total			203	12	11	3	29	3	243	18
