= Daiki Fukazawa =

Japanese footballer

Daiki Fukazawa 深澤 大輝
Personal information
- Date of birth: 21 August 1998 (age 28)
- Place of birth: Tokyo, Japan
- Height: 1.74 m (5 ft 9 in)
- Position: Defender

Team information
- Current team: Avispa Fukuoka
- Number: 23

Youth career
- Nishihara SSS
- –2016: Tokyo Verdy

College career
Years	Team	Apps	(Gls)
2017–2020	Chuo University		

Senior career*
Years	Team	Apps	(Gls)
2020–2026	Tokyo Verdy	128	(9)
2026–	Avispa Fukuoka	0	(0)
- * Club domestic league appearances and goals as of 10:04, 5 August 2026 (UTC)

Daiki Fukazawa (深澤 大輝, Fukazawa Daiki; born 21 August 1998) is a Japanese footballer who plays as a defender for J1 League club Avispa Fukuoka.

== Career statistics ==
=== Club ===
As of 5 August 2026.

Appearances and goals by club, season and competition
Club	Season	League			National cup (Note: Includes Emperors Cup)		League cup (Note: Includes J.League Cup)		Other		Total	
Club	Season	Division	Apps	Goals	Apps	Goals	Apps	Goals	Apps	Goals	Apps	Goals
Tokyo Verdy	2021	J2 League	17	1	0	0	0	0	0	0	17	1
Tokyo Verdy	2022	J2 League	32	3	2	0	0	0	0	0	34	3
Tokyo Verdy	2023	J2 League	27	4	0	0	0	0	2 (Note: Appearance in J1/J2 play-offs)	0	29	4
Tokyo Verdy	2024	J1 League	13	0	2	0	1	0	0	0	16	0
Tokyo Verdy	2025	J1 League	22	1	2	0	3	0	0	0	27	1
Tokyo Verdy	2026	J1 (100)	17	0	0	0	0	0	0	0	17	0
Tokyo Verdy	Total		128	9	6	0	4	0	2	0	140	9
Avispa Fukuoka	2026–27	J1 League	0	0	0	0	0	0	0	0	0	0
Career total			128	9	6	0	4	0	2	0	140	9
