= Daichi Matsuoka =

Japanese footballer

Personal information
- Full name: Daichi Matsuoka
- Date of birth: January 23, 1999 (age 27)
- Place of birth: Toyama, Japan
- Height: 1.71 m (5 ft 7 1/2 in)
- Position: Forward

Team information
- Current team: Kataller Toyama
- Number: 8

Youth career
- Cerezo Osaka

Senior career*
| Years | Team | Apps | (Gls) |
| 2016 | Cerezo Osaka | 1 | (0) |
| 2021– | Kataller Toyama | 135 | (11) |
- * Club domestic league appearances and goals as of 16 August 2026

Daichi Matsuoka (松岡 大智, Matsuoka Daichi; born January 23, 1999) is a Japanese football player who plays for Kataller Toyama.

== Career ==
Daichi Matsuoka joined Cerezo Osaka in 2016. On June 12, he debuted in J3 League (v Kataller Toyama).

He joined Kataller Toyama in 2021.
