= Issei Takahashi (footballer) =

Japanese footballer

Personal information
- Full name: Issei Takahashi
- Date of birth: April 20, 1998 (age 28)
- Place of birth: Aomori, Japan
- Height: 1.78 m (5 ft 10 in)
- Position: Midfielder

Team information
- Current team: Vissel Kobe
- Number: 17

Youth career
- Aomori FC
- 2011–2013: Aomori Yamada Junior High School
- 2014–2016: Aomori Yamada High School

Senior career*
Years	Team	Apps	(Gls)
2017–2026	JEF United Chiba	208	(13)
2018	→ Renofa Yamaguchi (loan)	10	(0)
2019	→ Montedio Yamagata (loan)	0	(0)
2026–	Vissel Kobe	0	(0)
- * Club domestic league appearances and goals as of 10 August 2026

Issei Takahashi (髙橋 壱晟, Takahashi Issei; born April 20, 1998) is a Japanese football player who currently plays for Vissel Kobe.

== Career ==
Issei Takahashi joined J2 League club JEF United Chiba in 2017.

== Club statistics ==
Updated to 7 January 2019.

Club performance			League		Cup		Total	
Season	Club	League	Apps	Goals	Apps	Goals	Apps	Goals
Japan			League		Emperor's Cup		Total	
2017	JEF United Chiba	J2 League	23	2	1	0	24	2
2018	Renofa Yamaguchi	J2 League	10	0	1	0	11	0
2019	Montedio Yamagata	J2 League						
Total			33	2	2	0	35	2
