= Yohei Ono =

Japanese footballer

Yohei Ono 大野 耀平
Personal information
- Full name: Yohei Ono
- Date of birth: December 6, 1994 (age 31)
- Place of birth: Tokyo, Japan
- Height: 1.84 m (6 ft 1/2 in)
- Position: Forward

Team information
- Current team: Kamatamare Sanuki
- Number: 9

Youth career
- Takashimadaira SC
- –2009: Urawa Red Diamonds
- 2010–2012: Teikyo High School

College career
Years	Team	Apps	(Gls)
2013–2016	Tokoha University		

Senior career*
Years	Team	Apps	(Gls)
2017–2020	Kyoto Sanga	34	(5)
2020	→ Kataller Toyama (loan)	21	(3)
2021–2023	Kataller Toyama	74	(21)
2024–	Kamatamare Sanuki	54	(8)
- * Club domestic league appearances and goals as of 17 August 2026

Yohei Ono (大野 耀平, Ono Yohei; born December 6, 1994) is a Japanese football player. He plays for Kamatamare Sanuki.

== Career ==
Yohei Ono joined J2 League club Kyoto Sanga FC in 2017.

== Career statistics ==
Updated to end of 2018 season.

Appearances and goals by club, season and competition
Club	Season	League			Emperor's Cup		Total	
Club	Season	Division	Apps	Goals	Apps	Goals	Apps	Goals
Kyoto Sanga	2017	J2 League	8	1	0	0	8	1
Kyoto Sanga	2018	J2 League	16	3	1	0	17	3
Career total			24	4	1	0	25	4
