= Yuta Narawa =

Japanese footballer

Yuta Narawa 奈良輪雄太
Personal information
- Full name: Yuta Narawa
- Date of birth: 29 August 1987 (age 39)
- Place of birth: Kōnan-ku, Yokohama, Japan
- Height: 1.72 m (5 ft 8 in)
- Position: Defender

Youth career
- 2000–2005: Yokohama F. Marinos

College career
Years	Team	Apps	(Gls)
2006–2009	University of Tsukuba		

Senior career*
Years	Team	Apps	(Gls)
2010–2012	Sagawa Shiga FC	88	(6)
2013–2015	Yokohama F. Marinos	28	(0)
2016–2018	Shonan Bellmare	44	(1)
2018	→ Tokyo Verdy (loan)	44	(2)
2019–2023	Tokyo Verdy	84	(1)
Medal record
Yokohama F. Marinos
Runner-up	J1 League	2013
Winner	Emperor's Cup	2013
Shonan Bellmare
Winner	J2 League	2017
- * Club domestic league appearances and goals

Yuta Narawa (奈良輪 雄太, Narawa Yūta; born 29 August 1987) is a Japanese professional footballer who plays as a defender.

== Career statistics ==
As of 5 March 2023.

Club	Season	League		Emperor's Cup		J. League Cup		Asia		Other^{1}		Total	
Club	Season	Apps	Goals	Apps	Goals	Apps	Goals	Apps	Goals	Apps	Goals	Apps	Goals
Sagawa Shiga FC	2010	28	3	1	0	–		–		–		0	0
Sagawa Shiga FC	2011	31	1	2	0	–		–		–		33	1
Sagawa Shiga FC	2012	29	2	3	0	–		–		–		32	2
Yokohama F. Marinos	2013	10	0	4	0	2	1	–		–		16	1
Yokohama F. Marinos	2014	17	0	2	0	2	0	4	0	0	0	25	0
Yokohama F. Marinos	2015	1	0	2	0	1	0	–		–		4	0
Shonan Bellmare	2016	19	0	2	0	5	0	–		–		26	0
Shonan Bellmare	2017	25	1	2	0	–		–		–		27	1
Tokyo Verdy	2018	42	2	–		–		–		–		42	2
Tokyo Verdy	2019	37	1	–		–		–		–		37	1
Tokyo Verdy	2020	24	0	–		–		–		–		24	0
Tokyo Verdy	2021	5	0	–		–		–		–		5	0
Tokyo Verdy	2022	15	0	3	1	–		–		–		18	1
Tokyo Verdy	2023	3	0	–		–		–		–		3	0
Career total		286	10	21	1	10	1	4	0	0	0	321	12

^{1}Includes Japanese Super Cup.

== Honours ==
Yokohama Marinos

- Emperor's Cup (1): 2013

Shonan Bellmare

- J2 League (1): 2017
