= Fukushima United FC =

Japanese football club

Fukushima United 福島ユナイテッド
- Full name: Fukushima United Football Club
- Founded: April 2002; 24 years ago as Fukushima Dream Junkers
- Stadium: Toho Stadium; Fukushima, Fukushima
- Capacity: 21,000
- Chairman: Hayato Suzuki
- Manager: Shuhei Terada
- League: J3 League
- 2025: J3 League, 10th of 20
- Website: fufc.jp
Home colours	Away colours

Fukushima United (福島ユナイテッド, Fukushima Yunaiteddo Efushī) is a Japanese football club from Fukushima City, the capital of Fukushima Prefecture. They currently play in the J3 League, Japan's third tier of professional football.

== History ==
The club was founded in 2006, by the merger of FC Pelada Fukushima and Junkers. From the 2008 season, the club has adopted the new name as Fukushima United Football Club. They played in the Japan Football League, the third tier of the Japanese football league system in 2013. Starting in 2014, they were promoted to the newly formed, J3 League.

On 28 October 2022, Fukushima United acquired the J2 license, meaning that from the 2022 season, they can now be promoted to the J2 League if the club finishes the league season either on 1st or 2nd place.

== Stadium ==
The home stadium is in Fukushima City, Toho Stadium (とうほう・みんなのスタジアム, Tōhō Minna no Sutajiumu).

The stadium's original name was Toho Minnano Stadium. Since May 2013 it has been called Toho Stadium as the naming rights were required by Toho Bank. The stadium has a full 400 metre, nine lane athletics track around the playing surface. The J. League restricts the capacity to 6,464, as they do not regard grass seats included in the stadium capacity. The pitch surface is natrural grass. The stadium was opened in 1994.

Some home games have also been played at the Aizu Athletic Park Stadium, in Aizuwakamatsu City, usually once per season, with a seating capacity of 7,300.

== League and cup record ==
Champions	Runners-up	Third place	Promoted	Relegated

League														J. League Cup	Emperor's Cup	Shakaijin Cup
Season	Division	Tier	Teams	Pos.	P	W	D	L	F	A	GD	Pts	Attendance/G	J. League Cup	Emperor's Cup	Shakaijin Cup
2011	Tohoku Soccer; League (Div.1)	4	7	1st	12	11	0	1	53	6	47	33		Not eligible	2nd round	1st round
2012	Tohoku Soccer; League (Div.1)	4	7	1st	12	11	0	1	61	6	55	33		Not eligible	4th round	Runner's up
2013	JFL	3	18	14th	34	8	10	16	35	42	-7	34	1,027	Not eligible	2nd round	Not eligible
2014	J3	3	12	7th	33	9	9	15	30	38	-8	36	1,321	Not eligible	1st round	Not eligible
2015	J3	3	13	7th	36	13	10	13	42	48	-6	49	1,289	Not eligible	1st round	Not eligible
2016	J3	3	16	14th	30	7	9	14	35	44	-9	30	1,678	Not eligible	2nd round	Not eligible
2017	J3	3	17	10th	32	13	4	15	39	43	-4	43	1,485	Not eligible	Did not qualify	Not eligible
2018	J3	3	17	12th	32	9	13	10	36	43	-7	40	1,576	Not eligible	Did not qualify	Not eligible
2019	J3	3	18	11th	34	13	4	17	45	53	-8	43	1,645	Not eligible	Did not qualify	Not eligible
2020 †	J3	3	18	13th	34	11	6	17	46	55	-9	39	582	Not eligible	Did not qualify	Not eligible
2021 †	J3	3	15	5th	28	13	6	9	41	32	9	45	876	Not eligible	Did not qualify	Not eligible
2022	J3	3	18	11th	34	11	9	14	37	45	-8	42	1,465	Not eligible	2nd round	Not eligible
2023	J3	3	20	15th	38	12	11	15	37	42	-5	47	1,205	Not eligible	2nd round	Not eligible
2024	J3	3	20	5th	38	18	5	15	64	49	15	59	1,800	1st round	2nd round	Not eligible
2025	J3	3	20	10th	38	16	8	14	60	67	-7	56	2,374	2nd round	2nd round	Not eligible
2026	J3	3	40	33rd	18	4	4	10	28	41	-13	18	3,077	N/A	N/A	Not eligible
2026-27	J3	3	20	TBD	38									TBD	TBD	Not eligible

Key

- Pos. = Position in league; P = Games played; W = Games won; D = Games drawn; L = Games lost; F = Goals scored; A = Goals conceded; GD = Goals difference; Pts = Points gained
- Attendance/G = Average home league attendance
- † 2020 & 2021 seasons attendances reduced by COVID-19 worldwide pandemic
- Source: J.League Data Site

== Honours ==
Fukushima United FC Honours
Honour	No.	Years
Tohoku Soccer League Division 2 South	1	2008
Fukushima Prefectural Football Championship (Emperor's Cup Fukushima Prefectural Qualifiers)	13	2008, 2009, 2010, 2011, 2012, 2013, 2014, 2015, 2016, 2022, 2023, 2024, 2025
Tohoku Soccer League Division 1	2	2011, 2012
East Japan Adult Football Tournament:	1	2012

== Current squad ==
As of 1 August 2026

Note: Flags indicate national team as defined under FIFA eligibility rules; some limited exceptions apply. Players may hold more than one non-FIFA nationality.

No.	Pos.	Nation	Player
1	GK	JPN	Tomoki Ueda
5	DF	JPN	Hayate Toma
7	MF	JPN	Kosei Ashibe (on loan from Machida Zelvia)
8	MF	JPN	Yuki Okada
9	FW	JPN	Kazumasa Shimizu
10	MF	JPN	Takeaki Harigaya
11	FW	JPN	Kazuyoshi Miura (on loan from Yokohama FC)
14	MF	JPN	Tsubasa Nakamura
15	DF	JPN	Hyeong-min Nam
17	DF	JPN	Takumi Fujitani
19	MF	JPN	Jiro Fujita
20	MF	JPN	Saiki Izumi
22	GK	JPN	Kenshin Yoshimaru
23	DF	JPN	Tatsuya Anzai

No.	Pos.	Nation	Player
26	MF	JPN	Keita Tanaka
27	DF	JPN	Satoru Nozue
28	DF	JPN	Naoki Suzu
29	DF	JPN	Kaito Tsuchiya (on loan from Kawasaki Frontale)
30	MF	JPN	Kaisei Kano
31	GK	JPN	Shun Anzai
37	DF	JPN	Naru Sasaki (on loan from V-Varen Nagasaki)
40	FW	JPN	Hiroki Higuchi
41	GK	JPN	Yudai Tanaka
44	MF	JPN	Koya Okuda
66	DF	JPN	Makito Uehara
77	DF	JPN	Toraji Chiba (on loan from Montedio Yamagata)
78	GK	KOR	Jung Sung-ryong
96	MF	JPN	Jimpei Yoshida (on loan from Albirex Niigata)

=== Out on loan ===
Note: Flags indicate national team as defined under FIFA eligibility rules; some limited exceptions apply. Players may hold more than one non-FIFA nationality.

No.	Pos.	Nation	Player
—	GK	JPN	Shin Nakagawa (at FC Tiamo Hirakata)
18	FW	JPN	Ryoma Ishii (at FC Tiamo Hirakata)

== Coaching staff ==
Coaching staff for the 2025 season

Position	Name
Manager	(Japan) Shuhei Terada
Head coach	(Japan) Toshihiko Uchiyama
Coach	(Japan) Noriaki Jishin
Goalkeeper coach	(Japan) Takashi Aizawa
Analysis & Assistant coach	(Japan) Kentaro Nagai
Assistant coach	(Japan) Katsumi Yusa
S&C coach	(Japan) Yu Suzuki
Competent	(Japan) Kenta Kuyama
Deputy officer	(Japan) Yu Kano
Athletic Trainer	(Japan) Shun Shimizu (Japan) Hiroki Funakubo

== Managerial history ==
Manager	Nationality	Tenure	
Manager	Nationality	Start	Finish
Satoshi Tezuka	Japan	1 January 2010	31 January 2012
Yū Tokisaki	Japan	1 February 2012	31 January 2014
Keisuke Kurihara	Japan	1 February 2014	31 January 2017
Kazuaki Tasaka	Japan	1 February 2017	31 January 2019
Takeo Matsuda	Japan	1 February 2019	31 January 2021
Yū Tokisaki	Japan	1 February 2021	31 January 2022
Toshihiro Hattori	Japan	1 February 2022	12 July 2023
Mitsumasa Yoda	Japan	13 July 2023	31 January 2024
Shuhei Terada	Japan	1 February 2024	Current

== Kit evolution ==
Home kit - 1st
2008 - 2009	2010	2011 - 2012	2013	2014
2015	2016	2017	2018	2019
2020	2021	2022	2023	2024
2025	2026 -			

Away kit - 2nd
2008 - 2009	2010	2011 - 2012	2013	2014
2015	2016	2017	2018	2019
2020	2021	2022	2023	2024
2025	2026 -			

Special - 3rd
2017; Peach Uni	2018; Peach Uni	2019; Peach Uni	2020; Peach Uni	2020; U.S. Uni
2021; 10th Anniversary	2021; Peach Uni	2021; U.S. Uni	2022; Peach Uni	2022; U.S. Uni
2023 3rd Fukushima SDGs Uni	2024 3rd Fukushima SDGs Uni	2025 3rd Fukushima SDGs Uni		
