= Kyota Mochii =

Japanese footballer (born 1999)

Kyota Mochii 持井 響太
Personal information
- Date of birth: 20 January 1999 (age 27)
- Place of birth: Hyōgo, Japan
- Height: 1.68 m (5 ft 6 in)
- Position: Midfielder

Team information
- Current team: FC Imabari
- Number: 17

Youth career
- Takasago Red Star FC
- Hyogo FC
- Il Sole Ono FC
- 2014–2016: Takigawa Daini High School

College career
Years	Team	Apps	(Gls)
2017–2020	Meiji University		

Senior career*
Years	Team	Apps	(Gls)
2021–2023	Tokyo Verdy	12	(0)
2022	→ SC Sagamihara (loan)	13	(0)
2023	→ Azul Claro Numazu (loan)	36	(7)
2024	Azul Claro Numazu	37	(5)
2025–	FC Imabari	40	(1)
- * Club domestic league appearances and goals as of 17 August 2026

Kyota Mochii (持井 響太, Mochii Kyota; born 20 January 1999) is a Japanese footballer who playing as a midfielder and currently play for FC Imabari.

== Career ==
On 24 August 2020, Mochii announce first signing professional contact with Tokyo Verdy from 2021 season.

On 28 December 2021, Mochii signed to J3 relegated club, SC Sagamihara from 2022 season.

On 9 January 2023, Mochii signed to J3 club, Azul Claro Numazu on loan for ahead of 2023 season. Mochii announce official permanent transfer to Azul Claro Numazu after loan ended in a season.

On 20 December 2024, Mochii announcement officially transfer to J2 promoted club, FC Imabari from 2025 season.

== Career statistics ==
=== Club ===
As of the start from 2025 season.

Club	Season	League			National Cup		League Cup		Other		Total	
Club	Season	Division	Apps	Goals	Apps	Goals	Apps	Goals	Apps	Goals	Apps	Goals
Meiji University	2019	–			1 (Note: Appearances in the Emperor's Cup)	0	–		0	0	1	0
Tokyo Verdy	2021	J2 League	12	0	1	0	0	0	0	0	13	0
SC Sagamihara	2022	J3 League	13	0	0	0	0	0	0	0	13	0
Azul Claro Numazu (loan)	2023	J3 League	36	7	1	0	0	0	0	0	37	7
Azul Claro Numazu	2024	J3 League	37	5	1	0	2	0	0	0	40	5
FC Imabari	2025	J2 League	0	0	0	0	0	0	0	0	0	0
Career total			98	12	4	0	2	0	0	0	104	12
