= Makito Uehara =

Japanese footballer

Personal information
- Date of birth: 20 November 1998 (age 27)
- Place of birth: Okinawa, Japan
- Height: 1.82 m (6 ft 0 in)
- Position: Defender

Team information
- Current team: Fukushima United FC
- Number: 66

Youth career
- –2010: Takara FC
- 2011–2013: Oroku Junior High School
- 2014–2016: Naha Nishi High School

College career
Years	Team	Apps	(Gls)
2017–2020	Josai International University		

Senior career*
Years	Team	Apps	(Gls)
2020–2024	FC Ryukyu	115	(2)
2025–2026	Sagan Tosu	23	(0)
2026–	Fukushima United FC	3	(0)
- * Club domestic league appearances and goals as of 25 August 2026

Makito Uehara (上原 牧人, Uehara Makito; born 20 November 1998) is a Japanese footballer who plays as a defender for J3 League club Fukushima United FC.

== Career statistics ==
=== Club ===
As of 28 March 2021.

Club	Season	League			National Cup		League Cup		Other		Total	
Club	Season	Division	Apps	Goals	Apps	Goals	Apps	Goals	Apps	Goals	Apps	Goals
FC Ryukyu	2020	J2 League	15	1	0	0	0	0	0	0	15	1
FC Ryukyu	2021	J2 League	1	0	0	0	0	0	0	0	1	0
Career total			16	1	0	0	0	0	0	0	16	1
