= Kohei Yamakoshi =

Japanese footballer

Kohei Yamakoshi 山越 康平
Personal information
- Full name: Kohei Yamakoshi
- Date of birth: 4 May 1993 (age 33)
- Place of birth: Yaita, Tochigi, Japan
- Height: 1.81 m (5 ft 11 in)
- Position: Defender

Team information
- Current team: Tokushima Vortis
- Number: 15

Youth career
- KT Union
- 2006–2008: Tochigi SC
- 2009–2011: Yaita Chuo High School

College career
Years	Team	Apps	(Gls)
2012–2015	Meiji University		

Senior career*
Years	Team	Apps	(Gls)
2016–2021	Omiya Ardija	105	(2)
2022–2024	Tokyo Verdy	55	(3)
2024	→ JEF United Chiba (loan)	12	(0)
2025–	Tokushima Vortis	34	(0)
- * Club domestic league appearances and goals as of 14 August 2026

Kohei Yamakoshi (山越 康平, Yamakoshi Kōhei; born 4 May 1993) is a Japanese professional footballer who plays as a defender for the J2 League club Tokushima Vortis.

== Club statistics ==
As of end of 2024 season

Appearances and goals by club, season and competition
Club	Season	League			National Cup		League Cup		Other		Total	
Club	Season	Division	Apps	Goals	Apps	Goals	Apps	Goals	Apps	Goals	Apps	Goals
Japan			League		Emperor's Cup		J. League Cup		Other		Total	
Meiji University	2014	–			1	0	–		–		1	0
Omiya Ardija	2016	J1 League	14	0	2	0	6	0	–		22	0
Omiya Ardija	2017	J1 League	23	1	4	1	3	0	–		30	2
Omiya Ardija	2018	J2 League	25	0	2	0	–		–		27	0
Omiya Ardija	2019	J2 League	6	0	0	0	0	0	0	0	6	0
Omiya Ardija	2020	J2 League	17	0	0	0	0	0	0	0	17	0
Omiya Ardija	2021	J2 League	20	1	1	0	0	0	0	0	21	1
Omiya Ardija	Total		105	2	9	1	9	0	0	0	123	3
Tokyo Verdy	2022	J2 League	20	1	1	0	–		–		21	1
Tokyo Verdy	2023	J2 League	31	2	1	0	–		1 (Note: Appearance in the J1/J2 promotion play-offs)	0	33	2
Tokyo Verdy	2024	J1 League	4	0	0	0	2	0	–		6	0
Tokyo Verdy	Total		55	3	2	0	2	0	1	0	60	3
JEF United Chiba (loan)	2024	J2 League	12	0	1	0	–		–		13	0
Career total			172	5	13	1	11	0	1	0	93	2
