= 2023 Ventforet Kofu season =

Ventforet Kofu
2023 season
- Chairman: Kazuyuki Umino
- Manager: Yoshiyuki Shinoda
- Stadium: JIT Recycle Ink Stadium
- J2 League: 8th
- Emperor's Cup: Second round
- AFC Champions League: Round of 16
- Average home league attendance: 7,664
- Biggest win: Mito HollyHock 2–4 Ventforet Kofu
- Biggest defeat: Ventforet Kofu 0–3 Vegalta Sendai
Home colours	Away colours
- All statistics correct as of 13 May 2023.

The 2023 season was Ventforet Kofu's 58th season in existence and the club's sixth consecutive season in the second division of Japanese football. In addition to the domestic league, Ventforet Kofu participated in this season's edition of the Emperor's Cup. The club make their debut in the AFC Champions League, having secured their place after winning the Emperor's Cup.

== Players ==
=== First-team squad ===
As of 20 February 2023.

Note: Flags indicate national team as defined under FIFA eligibility rules; some limited exceptions apply. Players may hold more than one non-FIFA nationality.

No.	Pos.	Nation	Player
1	GK	JPN	Kohei Kawata
2	DF	JPN	Hidehiro Sugai
4	DF	JPN	Hideomi Yamamoto (Captain)
5	DF	JPN	Sodai Hasukawa (on loan from FC Tokyo)
6	MF	JPN	Iwana Kobayashi
7	MF	JPN	Sho Araki
8	MF	JPN	Kosuke Taketomi
9	FW	JPN	Kazushi Mitsuhira
10	MF	JPN	Motoki Hasegawa
11	FW	JPN	Kohei Matsumoto
13	DF	JPN	Sota Miura
14	MF	JPN	Riku Nakayama
15	FW	JPN	Riku Iijima
16	MF	JPN	Koya Hayashida
17	MF	JPN	Manato Shinada (on loan from FC Tokyo)
18	MF	JPN	Yoshiki Torikai
19	FW	JPN	Jumma Miyazaki

No.	Pos.	Nation	Player
20	MF	JPN	Hikaru Endo
21	GK	JPN	Tsubasa Shibuya
22	DF	JPN	Riku Nozawa
23	DF	JPN	Masahiro Sekiguchi
24	MF	JPN	Nagi Matsumoto (on loan from Cerezo Osaka)
25	DF	JPN	Yuzuki Yamato
26	MF	JPN	Kazuhiro Sato
28	FW	JPN	Hayata Mizuno
29	DF	JPN	Kaito Kamiya (on loan from Kawasaki Frontale)
33	GK	JPN	Kodai Yamauchi
35	DF	JPN	Taiju Ichinose ^{DSP}
40	DF	BRA	Eduardo Mancha
41	MF	JPN	Kodai Dohi (on loan from Sanfrecce Hiroshima)
44	FW	JPN	Yamato Naito
77	FW	BRA	Getulio (on loan from Tombense FC)
99	FW	NGR	Peter Utaka

== Pre-season and friendlies ==
Win Draw Loss Fixtures

== Competitions ==
=== Overview ===
Competition	First match	Last match	Starting round	Record							
Competition	First match	Last match	Starting round	Pld	W	D	L	GF	GA	GD	Win %
J2 League	19 February 2023	12 November 2023	Matchday 1	42	18	10	14	60	50	+10	42.86
Emperor's Cup	21 June 2023	2 August 2023	Second round	3	1	1	1	3	5	−2	33.33
AFC Champions League	19 September 2023	21 February 2024	Group stage	8	3	2	3	12	13	−1	37.50
Total				53	22	13	18	75	68	+7	41.51

Last updated: 27 May 2023
Source: Soccerway

=== J2 League ===
==== League table ====
Pos	Team	Pld	W	D	L	GF	GA	GD	Pts	Promotion or relegation
6	JEF United Chiba	42	19	10	13	61	53	+8	67	Qualification for the promotion play-offs
7	V-Varen Nagasaki	42	18	11	13	70	56	+14	65	
8	Ventforet Kofu	42	18	10	14	60	50	+10	64	
9	Oita Trinita	42	17	11	14	54	56	−2	62	
10	Fagiano Okayama	42	13	19	10	49	49	0	58	

Source: Meiji Yasuda J2 League, J.League Data Site
Rules for classification: 1) Points; 2) Goal difference; 3) Goals scored; 4) Head-to-head points; 5) Head-to-head goal difference; 6) Head-to-head goal scored; 7) Fair-play points.

==== Results summary ====
Overall								Home						Away					
Pld	W	D	L	GF	GA	GD	Pts	W	D	L	GF	GA	GD	W	D	L	GF	GA	GD
18	10	2	6	24	19	+5	32	6	1	3	13	9	+4	4	1	3	11	10	+1

Last updated: 27 May 2023.
Source: Worldfootball

==== Results by round ====
Round	1	2	3	4	5	6	7	8	9	10	11	12	13	14	15	16	17	18
Ground	H	H	A	H	A	A	H	H	A	H	H	A	H	A	H	A	A	H
Result	L	D	D	W	W	W	W	L	L	W	W	L	W	L	L	W	W	W
Position	18	16	17	11	6	5	4	6	7	7	4	6	5	6	8	7	4	

Updated to match(es) played on 27 May 2023. Source: Worldfootball
A = Away; H = Home; W = Win; D = Draw; L = Loss

==== Matches ====
The league fixtures were announced on 20 January 2023.

18 February 2023 1	Ventforet Kofu	1–2	Montedio Yamagata	Kōfu
13:09	Iijima (yellow card) 59'; Taketomi 70'; Yamamoto (yellow card) 76'	Report	Dellatorre 9'; Tiago Alves 77' (pen.)	Stadium: JIT Recycle Ink Stadium; Attendance: 9,573; Referee: Hirokazu Otsubo

25 February 2023 2	Ventforet Kofu	1–1	Tokushima Vortis	Kōfu
12:00	Eduardo Mancha 45+1'	Report	Miyazaki (yellow card) 17'; Nishino 49'; Sugimoto (yellow card) 77'; Cacá (yellow card) 84'	Stadium: JIT Recycle Ink Stadium; Attendance: 5,633; Referee: Yosuke Kubota

5 March 2023 3	Tokyo Verdy	0–0	Ventforet Kofu	Chōfu
14:03		Report		Stadium: Ajinomoto Stadium; Attendance: 8,448; Referee: Reo Tanaka

11 March 2023 4	Ventforet Kofu	2–1	Fujieda MYFC	Kōfu
12:00	Taketomi 37'; Hasegawa 71'	Report	Kubo 63'; Arai (yellow card) 80'; Sugita (yellow card) 90+3'	Stadium: JIT Recycle Ink Stadium; Attendance: 6,941; Referee: Keisuke Nobori

19 March 2023 5	Fagiano Okayama	2–3	Ventforet Kofu	Okayama
13:00	Yanagi 26'; Wakasa (yellow card) 40'; Sakuragawa 45'	Report	Shinada 3', 45+4'; Inoue 32'	Stadium: City Light Stadium; Referee: Tom Nield (England)

26 March 2023 6	Mito HollyHock	2–4	Ventforet Kofu	Mito
14:00	Ohara 32'; Teranuma 77'	Report	Matsumoto 39'; Mitsuhira 48'; Utaka 49', 90+1'	Stadium: K's denki Stadium Mito; Attendance: 2,475; Referee: Dai Matsumoto

1 April 2023 7	Ventforet Kofu	1–0	Shimizu S-Pulse	Kōfu
12:00	Shinada (yellow card) 57'; Hasegawa 82'	Report		Stadium: JIT Recycle Ink Stadium; Attendance: 11,643; Referee: Yuzo Sutani

8 April 2023 8	Ventforet Kofu	0–3	Vegalta Sendai	Kōfu
13:03		Report	Nakajima 25'; Yamada 45+2'; Goke 51'	Stadium: JIT Recycle Ink Stadium; Attendance: 6,804; Referee: Kazuyoshi Enomoto

12 April 2023 9	V-Varen Nagasaki	2–1	Ventforet Kofu	Isahaya
19:03	Kato 68'; Masuyama (yellow card) 78'; Edigar Junio 82' (pen.)	Report	Mitsuhira 19'	Stadium: Transcosmos Stadium Nagasaki; Attendance: 3,815; Referee: Tetsuro Yoshida

16 April 2023 10	Ventforet Kofu	1–0	Tochigi SC	Kōfu
12:00	Utaka 78'	Report	Omori (yellow card) 52'	Stadium: JIT Recycle Ink Stadium; Attendance: 6,143; Referee: Toru Kakinuma

22 April 2023 11	Ventforet Kofu	1–0	Machida Zelvia	Kofu
14:00	Utaka 41'; Sugai (yellow card) 57'; Matsumoto (yellow card) 90+2'	Report	Takae (yellow card) 55'	Stadium: JIT Recycle Ink Stadium; Attendance: 6,494; Referee: Koji Takasaki

29 April 2023 12	Thespakusatsu Gunma	2–1	Ventforet Kofu	Maebashi
14:03	Nagakura 59'; Okamoto 76'	Report	Araki (yellow card) 31'; Mitsuhira 47'; Kobayashi (yellow card) 74'; Hayashida (yellow card) 87'	Stadium: Shoda Shoyu Stadium Gunma; Attendance: 4,371; Referee: Reo Tanaka

3 May 2023 13	Ventforet Kofu	1–0	Iwaki FC	Kōfu
13:00	Utaka 39'	Report	Endo (red card) 31'; Kondo (yellow card) 90+7'	Stadium: JIT Recycle Ink Stadium; Attendance: 10,561; Referee: Tomokazu Sato

7 May 2023 14	Roasso Kumamoto	2–0	Ventforet Kofu	Kumamoto
13:00	Ishikawa 35', 87'; Aihara (yellow card) 79' (yellow-red card) 84'; Tashiro (yellow card) 90+4'	Report	Kobayashi (yellow card) 53'	Stadium: Egao Kenko Stadium; Attendance: 3,900; Referee: Yosuke Kubota

13 May 2023 15	Ventforet Kofu	0–1	JEF United Chiba	Kofu
14:00	Taketomi (yellow card) 76'	Report	Tanaka (yellow card) 52'; Nishikubo (yellow card) 68'; Miki 29', (yellow card) 84'	Stadium: JIT Recycle Ink Stadium; Attendance: 5,184; Referee: Keisuke Nobori

17 May 2023 16	Blaublitz Akita	0–1	Ventforet Kofu	Akita
18:00				Stadium: Soyu Stadium

21 May 2023 17	Zweigen Kanazawa	0–1	Ventforet Kofu	Kanazawa
13:00				Stadium: Ishikawa Athletics Stadium

=== Emperor's Cup ===
7 June Second round	V-Varen Nagasaki	0–1	Ventforet Kofu	Isahaya
19:00 JST		Report; Report	Edigar Junio 7' (o.g.)	Stadium: Transcosmos Stadium Nagasaki; Attendance: 2,304; Referee: Toru Kakinuma

12 July Third round	Kashima Antlers	1–1 (a.e.t.) (10–11 p)	Ventforet Kofu	Kōfu
19:05	Kakita 62'	Report	Nozawa 51'	Stadium: JIT Recycle Ink Stadium; Attendance: 6,301; Referee: Hiroyuki Kimura
	Penalties
	Pituca (penalty scored); Higuchi (penalty missed); Doi (penalty scored); Sekigawa (penalty scored); Nakama (penalty missed); Anzai (penalty scored); Matsumura (penalty scored); Ueda (penalty scored); Shoji (penalty scored); Oki (penalty scored); Suzuki (penalty scored); Pituca (penalty scored); Higuchi (penalty missed)		(penalty scored) Sugai; (penalty missed) Getúlio; (penalty scored) Hasegawa; (penalty scored) Utaka; (penalty missed) Mancha; (penalty scored) Nozawa; (penalty scored) Shinada; (penalty scored) Hasukawa; (penalty scored) Matsumoto; (penalty scored) Kobayashi; (penalty scored) Shibuya; (penalty scored) Sugai; (penalty scored) Getúlio
