= 2024 Ventforet Kofu season =

Ventforet Kofu
2024 season
- Manager: Yoshiyuki Shinoda (until 1 July); Shinji Otsuka
- Stadium: JIT Recycle Ink Stadium
- J2 League: 16th
- Emperor's Cup: Round of 16
- J.League Cup: Prime round Quarter-finals
- AFC Champions League: Round of 16
- Top goalscorer: League: Adaílton; Peter Utaka (8 each); All: Peter Utaka (11)
- Biggest win: Tokushima Vortis 1–5 Ventforet Kofu

The 2024 season was Ventforet Kofu's 59th season in existence and their 7th consecutive season in J2 League. In addition to the domestic league, they also took part in the Emperor's Cup, the J.League Cup and AFC Champions League.

== Squad ==
As of 19 April 2024.

Note: Flags indicate national team as defined under FIFA eligibility rules; some limited exceptions apply. Players may hold more than one non-FIFA nationality.

No.	Pos.	Nation	Player
1	GK	(Japan) JPN	Kohei Kawata
3	DF	(South Korea) KOR	Taiga Son
4	DF	(Japan) JPN	Hideomi Yamamoto
5	DF	(Japan) JPN	Yuta Imazu (vice-captain)
6	MF	(Japan) JPN	Iwana Kobayashi (vice-captain)
7	MF	(Japan) JPN	Sho Araki (vice-captain)
8	MF	(Japan) JPN	Kosuke Taketomi
9	FW	(Japan) JPN	Kazushi Mitsuhira
10	MF	(Japan) JPN	Yoshiki Torikai
11	FW	(Colombia) COL	Fabián González
13	FW	(Japan) JPN	Yukito Murakami
14	MF	(Japan) JPN	Riku Nakayama
15	FW	(Japan) JPN	Riku Iijima
16	MF	(Japan) JPN	Koya Hayashida
18	MF	(Japan) JPN	Naoto Misawa
19	FW	(Japan) JPN	Jumma Miyazaki
21	MF	(Brazil) BRA	Renato Augusto

No.	Pos.	Nation	Player
23	DF	(Japan) JPN	Masahiro Sekiguchi (captain)
24	DF	(Japan) JPN	Takahiro Iida (on loan from Kyoto Sanga)
26	MF	(Japan) JPN	Kazuhiro Sato
28	FW	(Japan) JPN	Hayata Mizuno
29	DF	(Japan) JPN	Kaito Kamiya
30	FW	(Japan) JPN	Kotatsu Kumakura ^{DSP}
31	GK	(Japan) JPN	Kakeru Miyashita ^{Type 2}
32	GK	(South Korea) KOR	Koh Bong-jo (on loan from Sagan Tosu)
33	GK	(Japan) JPN	Kodai Yamauchi
34	MF	(Japan) JPN	Takuto Kimura (on loan from Yokohama F. Marinos)
35	DF	(Japan) JPN	Taiju Ichinose ^{DSP}
40	DF	(Brazil) BRA	Eduardo Mancha
41	MF	(Japan) JPN	Miki Inoue
44	FW	(Japan) JPN	Yamato Naito
51	MF	(Brazil) BRA	Adaílton
88	GK	(Japan) JPN	Tsubasa Shibuya
99	FW	(Nigeria) NGA	Peter Utaka

=== Out on loan ===
Note: Flags indicate national team as defined under FIFA eligibility rules; some limited exceptions apply. Players may hold more than one non-FIFA nationality.

No. / Pos. / Nation / Player; 20 / MF / (Japan) JPN / Hikaru Endo (at Tegevajaro Miyazaki)	No. / Pos. / Nation / Player; 22 / DF / (Japan) JPN / Riku Nozawa (at FC Gifu)

== Competitions ==
=== Overall record ===
Competition	First match	Last match	Starting round	Final position	Record							
Competition	First match	Last match	Starting round	Final position	Pld	W	D	L	GF	GA	GD	Win %
J2 League	25 February 2024	10 November 2024	Matchday 1		24	6	8	10	34	36	−2	25.00
Emperor's Cup	12 June 2024				2	2	0	0	4	1	+3	100.00
J.League Cup	4 September 2024				0	0	0	0	0	0	+0	—
AFC Champions League	15 February 2024	21 February 2024	Round of 16	Round of 16	2	0	0	2	1	5	−4	0.00
Total					28	8	8	12	39	42	−3	28.57

Last updated: 14 July 2024
Source: Competitions

=== J2 League ===
==== League table ====
Pos	Team	Pld	W	D	L	GF	GA	GD	Pts
12	Roasso Kumamoto	38	13	7	18	53	62	−9	46
13	Fujieda MYFC	38	14	4	20	38	57	−19	46
14	Ventforet Kofu	38	12	9	17	54	57	−3	45
15	Mito HollyHock	38	11	11	16	39	51	−12	44
16	Oita Trinita	38	10	13	15	33	47	−14	43

Source: Meiji Yasuda J2 League, J.League Data Site
Rules for classification: 1) Points; 2) Goal difference; 3) Goals scored; 4) Head-to-head points; 5) Head-to-head goal difference; 6) Head-to-head goal scored; 7) Fair-play points.

==== Results summary ====
Overall								Home						Away					
Pld	W	D	L	GF	GA	GD	Pts	W	D	L	GF	GA	GD	W	D	L	GF	GA	GD
24	6	8	10	34	36	−2	26	1	4	7	15	21	−6	5	4	3	19	15	+4

Last updated: July 2024.

==== Results by round ====
Round	1	2	3	4	5	6	7	8	9	10	11	12	13	14	15	16	17	18	19	20	21	22	23	24
Ground	A	A	H	A	H	A	H	A	H	A	H	A	H	A	H	A	H	A	H	A	H	A	H	H
Result	W	W	L	W	D	D	L	W	L	D	W	L	L	W	D	L	L	L	D	D	L	D	L	D
Position																								

Updated to match(es) played on July 2024. Source:
A = Away; H = Home; W = Win; D = Draw; L = Loss

==== Matches ====
The fixtures were released on 23 January 2024.

25 February 2024 1	Tokushima Vortis	1–5	Ventforet Kofu	Naruto
19:00 UTC+9				Stadium: Pocarisweat Stadium

2 March 2024 2	Mito HollyHock	1–2	Ventforet Kofu	Mito
19:00 UTC+9				Stadium: K's denki Stadium Mito

19 May 2024 16	Fagiano Okayama	2–0	Ventforet Kofu	Okayama
19:00 UTC+9	Iwabuchi 11'; Lucão 82'			Stadium: City Light Stadium

25 May 2024 17	Ventforet Kofu	1–2	Yokohama FC	Kōfu
19:00 UTC+9				Stadium: JIT Recycle Ink Stadium

1 June 2024 18	Fujieda MYFC	2–1	Ventforet Kofu	Fujieda
19:00 UTC+9				Stadium: Fujieda Soccer Stadium

8 June 2024 19	Ventforet Kofu	1–1	Vegalta Sendai	Kōfu
19:00 UTC+9				Stadium: JIT Recycle Ink Stadium

16 June 2024 20	Iwaki FC	1–1	Ventforet Kofu	Iwaki
19:00 UTC+9				Stadium: Hawaiians Stadium Iwaki

22 June 2024 21	Ventforet Kofu	1–2	Ehime FC	Kōfu
19:00 UTC+9				Stadium: JIT Recycle Ink Stadium

29 June 2024 22	Oita Trinita	0–0	Ventforet Kofu	Ōita
19:00 UTC+9				Stadium: Resonac Dome Oita

6 July 2024 23	Ventforet Kofu	1–3	Tokushima Vortis	Kōfu
19:00 UTC+9				Stadium: JIT Recycle Ink Stadium

14 July 2024 24	Ventforet Kofu	2–2	V-Varen Nagasaki	Kōfu
19:00 UTC+9	Akino 47' (o.g.); Utaka 58'		Kato 45+1'; Sawada 90+9'	Stadium: JIT Recycle Ink Stadium

3 August 2024 25	Thespa Gunma	v	Ventforet Kofu	Maebashi
19:00 UTC+9				Stadium: Shoda Shoyu Stadium Gunma

=== Emperor's Cup ===
12 June 2024 Second round	Ventforet Kofu	2–0	Honda FC	Kōfu
19:00 UTC+9	Utaka 82', 90+1'			Stadium: JIT Recycle Ink Stadium

10 July 2024 Third round	Cerezo Osaka	1–2 (a.e.t.)	Ventforet Kofu	Kōfu
19:00 UTC+9	Watanabe 54'		Utaka 46'; Torikai 112'	Stadium: JIT Recycle Ink Stadium; Referee: Hiroki Kasahara

21 August 2024 Round of 16	Ventforet Kofu	v	Kashima Antlers	Kōfu
19:00 UTC+9				Stadium: JIT Recycle Ink Stadium
