= 2022 Emperor's Cup final =

2022年天皇杯決勝 (in Japanese)
- Event: 2022 Emperor's Cup
Ventforet Kofu	Sanfrecce Hiroshima
1	1
- After extra time Ventforet won 5–4 on penalties
- Date: 15 October 2022
- Venue: Nissan Stadium, Yokohama, Kanagawa
- Referee: Ryuji Sato
- Attendance: 37,998
- Weather: Cloudy; 25.4 °C (77.7 °F); 60% humidity

The 2022 Emperor's Cup final was the final of the 2022 Emperor's Cup, the 102nd edition of the Emperor's Cup. Ventforet Kofu played their first-ever Emperor's Cup final, as their past best performances were defeats in the quarter-finals in 2006, 2013, 2018, and 2019. It was also their first-ever elite cup final, as Kofu never got past the quarter-finals in the J.League Cup. Sanfrecce Hiroshima had their sixth major chance to win the trophy in the J.League era, having qualified for the final five times; in 1995, 1996, 1999, 2007, and 2013, losing in all five finals. As J2 League's Ventforet Kofu became one of the finalists, this 2022 final was the seventh of the competition to feature at least one team from the second tier of Japanese football, with a J2 League team appearing in the competition's final for the first time in 1980.

After the match, leaving as the final winners of the 2022 Emperor's Cup, Ventforet Kofu were granted the right to qualify for the 2023–24 AFC Champions League. For the second consecutive time, a club playing in the second division played in a continental competition, repeating Jeonnam Dragons' feat at the 2022 AFC Champions League.

== Teams ==
Team	League	Previous finals appearances (bold indicates winners)
Ventforet Kofu	J2 League	0
Sanfrecce Hiroshima	J1 League	14 (1954, 1957, **1965**, 1966, **1967**, **1969**, 1970, 1978, 1987, 1995, 1996, 1999, 2007, 2013)

== Road to the final ==
**Ventforet Kofu**		Round	**Sanfrecce Hiroshima**	
Opponent	Result	**2022 Emperor's Cup**	Opponent	Result
Bye		First round	Bye	
International Pacific University **(CSL)**	5–1	Second round	Honda Lock SC **(JFL)**	2–0
Hokkaido Consadole Sapporo **(J1)**	2–1	Third round	Yokohama FC **(J2)**	5–0
Sagan Tosu **(J1)**	3–1	Round of 16	Thespakusatsu Gunma **(J2)**	1–0
Avispa Fukuoka **(J1)**	2–1 (a.e.t)	Quarter-finals	Cerezo Osaka **(J1)**	2–1
Kashima Antlers **(J1)**	1–0	Semi-finals	Kyoto Sanga **(J1)**	2–1

== Format ==
The final was played in a single leg format. It was hurried to be played in mid-October, instead of January, as usual, due to the schedule conflict with the realization and holding period of the 2022 FIFA World Cup. Should the match remained tied after regulation time, extra time would have been added. Would it necessary, a penalty shoot-out would have been used to decide the winning team.

== Details ==
15 October 2022
14:03 JST

Ventforet Kofu	1–1 (a.e.t.)	Sanfrecce Hiroshima
Mitsuhira 26'	Report (JFA); Report (JFA)	Kawamura 84'
Penalties
Lira (penalty scored); Getúlio (penalty scored); Matsumoto (penalty scored); Ishikawa (penalty scored); Yamamoto (penalty scored)	5–4	(penalty scored) Sotiriou; (penalty scored) Matsumoto; (penalty scored) Ben Khalifa; (penalty missed) Kawamura; (penalty scored) Mitsuta

Japan National Stadium, Yokohama, Kanagawa
Attendance: 37,998
Referee: Ryuji Sato

**Ventforet Kofu**	**Sanfrecce Hiroshima**

GK	1	(Japan) Shuhei Kawata
DF	2	(Japan) Hidehiro Sugai
DF	5	(Japan) Niki Urakami	(substituted off) 112'
DF	23	(Japan) Masahiro Sekiguchi
DF	40	(Brazil) Eduardo Mancha
MF	7	(Japan) Sho Araki (c)	(substituted off) 66'
MF	18	(Japan) Yoshiki Torikai	(substituted off) 62'
MF	24	(Japan) Riku Yamada	(substituted off) 112'
MF	26	(Japan) Toshiki Ishikawa
MF	41	(Japan) Motoki Hasegawa	(substituted off) 101'
FW	9	(Japan) Kazushi Mitsuhira	(substituted off) 62'
Substitutes:
GK	31	(Japan) Kosuke Okanishi
DF	4	(Japan) Hideomi Yamamoto	(substituted on) 112'
DF	22	(Japan) Riku Nozawa	(substituted on) 66'
DF	32	(Brazil) Foguete	(substituted on) 112'
MF	20	(Japan) Nagi Matsumoto	(substituted on) 62'
FW	10	(Brazil) Willian Lira	(substituted on) 62'
FW	29	(Brazil) Getúlio	(substituted on) 101'
Manager:
(Japan) Tatsuma Yoshida

GK	38	(Japan) Keisuke Osako
DF	3	(Japan) Tsukasa Shiotani
DF	4	(Japan) Hayato Araki
DF	19	(Japan) Sho Sasaki (c)
MF	25	(Japan) Yusuke Chajima	(substituted off) 70'
MF	27	(Japan) Takumu Kawamura
MF	7	(Japan) Gakuto Notsuda	(substituted off) 79'
MF	18	(Japan) Yoshifumi Kashiwa	(substituted off) 70'
MF	10	(Japan) Tsukasa Morishima	(yellow card) 32' (substituted off) 46'
MF	39	(Japan) Makoto Mitsuta
FW	9	(Brazil) Douglas Vieira	(substituted off) 46'
Substitutes:
GK	22	(Japan) Goro Kawanami
DF	2	(Japan) Yuki Nogami	(substituted on) 70'
DF	21	(Japan) Jelani Reshaun Sumiyoshi	(substituted on) 91'
MF	14	(Brazil) Ezequiel	(substituted on) 46' (substituted off) 91'
MF	17	(Japan) Taishi Matsumoto	(substituted on) 70'
FW	13	(Switzerland) Nassim Ben Khalifa	(substituted on) 46'
FW	20	(Cyprus) Pieros Sotiriou	(substituted on) 79'
Manager:
(Germany) Michael Skibbe
