= 2023 Japanese Super Cup =

Yokohama F. Marinos	Ventforet Kofu
2	1
- Date: 11 February 2023
- Venue: Japan National Stadium, Tokyo
- Referee: Yusuke Araki
- Attendance: 50,923
- Weather: Fine; 12.6 °C (54.7 °F); 43% humidity

The 2023 Japanese Super Cup (known as Fujifilm Super Cup 2023 for sponsorship reasons) was the 30th Japanese Super Cup since its reestablishment, and the 38th overall. It was held on 11 February 2023 between the 2022 J1 League champions Yokohama F. Marinos and the 2022 Emperor's Cup winners Ventforet Kofu at the Japan National Stadium, Shinjuku, Tokyo. Both clubs were seeking their first Japanese Super Cup title.

Yokohama F. Marinos won their first Japanese Super Cup title at the seventh attempt after beating first-timer Ventforet Kofu 2–1.

== Details ==
11 February 2023
13:35 JST

Yokohama F. Marinos	2–1	Ventforet Kofu
Élber 30'; Nishimura 61'	JLeague.co (EN); JLeague.jp (JA)	Utaka 44'

Japan National Stadium
Attendance: 50,923
Referee: Yusuke Araki

Yokohama F. Marinos	Ventforet Kofu

GK	50	(Japan) Powell Obinna Obi
RB	15	(Japan) Takumi Kamijima
CB	4	(Japan) Shinnosuke Hatanaka
CB	33	(Japan) Ryotaro Tsunoda
LB	2	(Japan) Katsuya Nagato
CM	8	(Japan) Takuya Kida		(substituted off) 84'
CM	6	(Japan) Kota Watanabe
AM	30	(Japan) Takuma Nishimura		(substituted off) 67'
RF	18	(Japan) Kota Mizunuma		(substituted off) 67'
CF	11	(Brazil) Anderson Lopes	(yellow card) 85'	(substituted off) 90+6'
LF	7	(Brazil) Élber
Substitutes:
GK	31	(Japan) Fuma Shirasaka
DF	5	(Brazil) Eduardo
MF	10	(Brazil) Marcos Júnior		(substituted on) 67'
MF	16	(Japan) Joel Chima Fujita		(substituted on) 84'
MF	28	(Japan) Riku Yamane
FW	14	(Japan) Asahi Uenaka		(substituted on) 90+6'
FW	20	(Brazil) Yan Matheus		(substituted on) 67'
Manager:
(Australia) Kevin Muscat

GK	1	(Japan) Kohei Kawata
RB	2	(Japan) Hidehiro Sugai
CB	4	(Japan) Hideomi Yamamoto
CB	40	(Brazil) Eduardo Mancha
LB	13	(Japan) Sota Miura
CM	24	(Japan) Nagi Matsumoto
CM	26	(Japan) Kazuhiro Sato	(substituted off) 81'
RW	18	(Japan) Yoshiki Torikai	(substituted off) 71'
AM	10	(Japan) Motoki Hasegawa
LW	28	(Japan) Hayata Mizuno	(substituted off) 60'
CF	99	(Nigeria) Peter Utaka
Substitutes:
GK	21	(Japan) Tsubasa Shibuya
DF	23	(Japan) Masahiro Sekiguchi
DF	49	(Japan) Shion Inoue
MF	8	(Japan) Kosuke Taketomi	(substituted on) 81'
MF	17	(Japan) Manato Shinada
FW	9	(Japan) Kazushi Mitsuhira	(substituted on) 71'
FW	77	(Brazil) Getúlio	(substituted on) 60'
Manager:
Yoshiyuki Shinoda

Assistant referees:
Takeshi Asada
Kota Watanabe
Fourth official:
Yoshiro Imamura
Video assistant referee:
Hiroyuki Kimura
Assistant video assistant referee:
Jumpei Iida

Match rules

- 90 minutes.
- Penalty shoot-out if scores still level.
- Seven named substitutes.
- Maximum of five substitutions, and a maximum of two additional concussion substitutions.

== See also ==
- 2023 J1 League
- 2023 Emperor's Cup
- 2023 J.League Cup
