= 2023–24 AFC Champions League group stage =

Asian Football Confederation matches

The 2023–24 AFC Champions League group stage was played from September to December 2023.

A total of 40 teams competed in the group stage to decide the 16 places in the knockout stage of the 2023–24 AFC Champions League.

== Draw ==
The draw for the group stage was held on 24 August 2023 at the AFC House in Kuala Lumpur, Malaysia. The 40 teams were drawn into ten groups of four: five groups each in the West Region (Groups A–E) and the East Region (Groups F–J). For each region, teams were seeded into four pots and drawn into the relevant positions within each group, based on their association ranking and their seeding within their association, in consideration of the technical balance between groups. Teams from the same association could not be drawn into the same group.

Region	Groups	Pot 1	Pot 2	Pot 3	Pot 4
West Region	A–E	(Saudi Arabia) Al-Hilal	(Iran) Nassaji	(Jordan) Al-Faisaly SC	(United Arab Emirates) Al-Ain
West Region	A–E	(Iran) Persepolis	(Qatar) Al-Duhail	(Tajikistan) Istiklol	(Uzbekistan) Navbahor
West Region	A–E	(Qatar) Al-Sadd	(Uzbekistan) Nasaf Qarshi	(Iraq) Al-Quwa Al-Jawiya	(United Arab Emirates) Sharjah
West Region	A–E	(Uzbekistan) Pakhtakor	(Saudi Arabia) Al-Fayha	(Turkmenistan) Ahal Änew	(Saudi Arabia) Al-Nassr
West Region	A–E	(Saudi Arabia) Al-Ittihad	(Iran) Sepahan	(India) Mumbai City	(Uzbekistan) AGMK
East Region	F–J	(South Korea) Ulsan Hyundai	(Japan) Ventforet Kofu	(Vietnam) Hanoi FC	(Hong Kong) Kitchee
East Region	F–J	(Japan) Yokohama F. Marinos	(China) Shandong Taishan	(Philippines) Kaya F.C.–Iloilo	(South Korea) Incheon United
East Region	F–J	(China) Wuhan Three Towns	(Thailand) Bangkok United	(Malaysia) Johor Darul Ta'zim	(Japan) Urawa Red Diamonds
East Region	F–J	(Thailand) Buriram United	(South Korea) Pohang Steelers	(Australia) Melbourne City	(China) Zhejiang
East Region	F–J	(South Korea) Jeonbuk Hyundai Motors	(Japan) Kawasaki Frontale	(Singapore) Lion City Sailors	(Thailand) BG Pathum United

== Format ==
In the group stage, each group was played in a double round-robin format on home and away basis. The winners of each group and three best runners-up from each region advanced to the round of 16 of the knockout stage.

=== Tiebreakers ===
The teams were ranked according to points (3 points for a win, 1 point for a draw, 0 points for a loss). If tied on points, tiebreakers were applied in the following order (Regulations Article 8.3):

1. Points in head-to-head matches among tied teams;
2. Goal difference in head-to-head matches among tied teams;
3. Goals scored in head-to-head matches among tied teams;
4. If more than two teams were tied, and after applying all head-to-head criteria above, a subset of teams were still tied, all head-to-head criteria above were reapplied exclusively to this subset of teams;
5. Goal difference in all group matches;
6. Goals scored in all group matches;
7. Penalty shoot-out if only two teams playing each other in the last round of the group are tied;
8. Disciplinary points (yellow card = 1 point, red card as a result of two yellow cards = 3 points, direct red card = 3 points, yellow card followed by direct red card = 4 points);
9. Association ranking.

== Schedule ==
The schedule of the group stage was as follows.

Round	Dates
Matchday 1	18–20 September 2023
Matchday 2	2–4 October 2023
Matchday 3	23–25 October 2023
Matchday 4	6–8 November 2023
Matchday 5	27–29 November 2023
Matchday 6	4–6, 12–13 December 2023

== Groups ==
The detailed schedule was announced on 24 August 2023 after the draw ceremony. It was updated on 6 September.

=== Group A ===
Pos	Team	Pld	W	D	L	GF	GA	GD	Pts	Qualification	AIN	FEI	PAK	AHA
1	(United Arab Emirates) Al-Ain	6	5	0	1	17	9	+8	15	Advance to round of 16	—	4–1	1–3	4–2
2	(Saudi Arabia) Al-Fayha	6	3	0	3	12	10	+2	9	Advance to round of 16	2–3	—	2–0	3–1
3	(Uzbekistan) Pakhtakor	6	2	1	3	8	11	−3	7		0–3	1–4	—	3–0
4	(Turkmenistan) Ahal	6	1	1	4	6	13	−7	4		1–2	1–0	1–1	—

Source: AFC
Rules for classification: Tiebreakers
19 September 2023
19:00 UTC+5

Pakhtakor (Uzbekistan)	0–3	(United Arab Emirates) Al-Ain
	Report	Laba 11', 66'; Al-Balochi 25'

Bunyodkor Stadium (Note: Team did not use their own home stadium.), Tashkent
Attendance: 8,117
Referee: Ko Hyung-jin (South Korea)
19 September 2023
21:00 UTC+5

Ahal (Turkmenistan)	1–0	(Saudi Arabia) Al-Fayha
Tagaýew 51'	Report

Ashgabat Stadium, Ashgabat
Attendance: 19,966
Referee: Adham Makhadmeh (Jordan)

3 October 2023
20:00 UTC+4

Al-Ain (United Arab Emirates)	4–2	(Turkmenistan) Ahal
Erik 4'; Rahimi 32'; Laba 41'; Autonne 70'	Report	Tagaýew 58'; Meredov 85'

Hazza bin Zayed Stadium, Al Ain
Attendance: 8,126
Referee: Abdullah Jamali (Kuwait)
3 October 2023
19:00 UTC+3

Al-Fayha (Saudi Arabia)	2–0	(Uzbekistan) Pakhtakor
Sabiri 10', 71'	Report

Prince Faisal bin Fahd Stadium, Riyadh
Attendance: 1,088
Referee: Mohanad Qasim Sarray (Iraq)

24 October 2023
20:00 UTC+4

Al-Ain (United Arab Emirates)	4–1	(Saudi Arabia) Al-Fayha
Autonne 36'; Kaku 45+3', 67'; Rahimi 90'	Report	Al-Harthi 84'

Hazza bin Zayed Stadium, Al Ain
Attendance: 7,126
Referee: Hanna Hattab (Syria)
24 October 2023
19:00 UTC+5

Pakhtakor (Uzbekistan)	3–0	(Turkmenistan) Ahal
Erkinov 23'; Turgunboev 27', 59'	Report

Bunyodkor Stadium, Tashkent
Attendance: 2,110
Referee: Jumpei Iida (Japan)

7 November 2023
19:00 UTC+3

Al-Fayha (Saudi Arabia)	2–3	(United Arab Emirates) Al-Ain
Nwakaeme 53'; Al-Qaydhi 90+6'	Report	Laba 29', 40'; Rahimi 64'

King Fahd International Stadium, Riyadh
Attendance: 1,002
Referee: Ma Ning (China)
7 November 2023
19:00 UTC+5

Ahal (Turkmenistan)	1–1	(Uzbekistan) Pakhtakor
Abdyrahmanow 81'	Report	Erkinov 90+5'

Ashgabat Stadium, Ashgabat
Attendance: 17,270
Referee: Nazmi Nasaruddin (Malaysia)

28 November 2023
20:00 UTC+4

Al-Ain (United Arab Emirates)	1–3	(Uzbekistan) Pakhtakor
Khalfan 18'	Report	Erkinov 55', 62'; Ćeran 78'

Hazza bin Zayed Stadium, Al Ain
Attendance: 2,926
Referee: Adham Makhadmeh (Jordan)
28 November 2023
19:00 UTC+3

Al-Fayha (Saudi Arabia)	3–1	(Turkmenistan) Ahal
Nwakaeme 19' (pen.); Sakala 45+6'; Mandash 75'	Report	Tagaýew 36' (pen.)

Prince Faisal bin Fahd Stadium, Riyadh
Attendance: 133
Referee: Ahmad Al-Ali (Kuwait)

5 December 2023
19:00 UTC+5

Pakhtakor (Uzbekistan)	1–4	(Saudi Arabia) Al-Fayha
Erkinov 16'	Report	Sakala 40', 90+4'; Mandash 46'; Onyekuru 85'

Bunyodkor Stadium, Tashkent
Attendance: 2,150
Referee: Ahmed Al-Kaf (Oman)
5 December 2023
19:00 UTC+5

Ahal (Turkmenistan)	1–2	(United Arab Emirates) Al-Ain
Tagaýew 35'	Report	Rahimi 13' (pen.); Atzili 32' (pen.)

Ashgabat Stadium, Ashgabat
Attendance: 9,544
Referee: Kim Jong-hyeok (South Korea)

=== Group B ===
Pos	Team	Pld	W	D	L	GF	GA	GD	Pts	Qualification	NAS	SAD	SHJ	FAI
1	(Uzbekistan) Nasaf	6	3	2	1	10	6	+4	11	Advance to round of 16	—	3–1	1–1	3–1
2	(Qatar) Al Sadd	6	2	2	2	11	7	+4	8 (Note: Ranked on head-to-head points: Al Sadd 4, Sharjah 1.)		2–2	—	0–0	6–0
3	(United Arab Emirates) Sharjah	6	2	2	2	4	5	−1	8		1–0	0–2	—	1–0
4	(Jordan) Al-Faisaly	6	2	0	4	5	12	−7	6		0–1	2–0	2–1	—

Source: AFC
Rules for classification: Tiebreakers
Notes:
18 September 2023
19:00 UTC+3

Al-Faisaly (Jordan)	0–1	(Uzbekistan) Nasaf
	Report	Abdurakhmatov 90+7'

Amman International Stadium, Amman
Attendance: 13,750
Referee: Mohanad Qasim Sarray (Iraq)
18 September 2023
21:00 UTC+3

Al Sadd (Qatar)	0–0	(United Arab Emirates) Sharjah
	Report

Jassim bin Hamad Stadium, Al Rayyan
Attendance: 9,831
Referee: Muhammad Taqi (Singapore)

2 October 2023
18:00 UTC+4

Sharjah (United Arab Emirates)	1–0	(Jordan) Al-Faisaly
Marega 20'	Report

Sharjah Stadium, Sharjah
Attendance: 3,532
Referee: Sivakorn Pu-udom (Thailand)
2 October 2023
21:00 UTC+5

Nasaf (Uzbekistan)	3–1	(Qatar) Al Sadd
Nurulloyev 29'; Amonov 46', 58'	Report	Khoukhi 83'

Markaziy Stadium, Qarshi
Attendance: 8,428
Referee: Alireza Faghani (Australia)

23 October 2023
20:00 UTC+4

Sharjah (United Arab Emirates)	1–0	(Uzbekistan) Nasaf
Caio Lucas 45+5'	Report

Sharjah Stadium, Sharjah
Attendance: 1,163
Referee: Fu Ming (China)
23 October 2023
21:00 UTC+3

Al Sadd (Qatar)	6–0	(Jordan) Al-Faisaly
Bounedjah 8', 50', 63'; Plata 51'; Meshaal 52'; Abdurisag 83'	Report

Jassim bin Hamad Stadium, Al Rayyan
Attendance: 10,380
Referee: Khalid Al-Turais (Saudi Arabia)

6 November 2023
19:00 UTC+5

Nasaf (Uzbekistan)	1–1	(United Arab Emirates) Sharjah
Lima 81'	Report	Marega 16'

Markaziy Stadium, Qarshi
Attendance: 11,451
Referee: Mohammed Al-Hoaish (Saudi Arabia)
6 November 2023
21:00 UTC+3

Al-Faisaly (Jordan)	2–0	(Qatar) Al Sadd
Al-Rushadi 56'; Al-Haj 85'	Report

Amman International Stadium, Amman
Attendance: 2,430
Referee: Sadullo Gulmurodi (Tajikistan)

27 November 2023
19:00 UTC+5

Nasaf (Uzbekistan)	3–1	(Jordan) Al-Faisaly
Mateus 47'; Abdurakhmatov 50'; Stanojević 68'	Report	Bani Hani 45+6'

Markaziy Stadium, Qarshi
Attendance: 8,457
Referee: Kim Hee-gon (South Korea)
27 November 2023
18:00 UTC+4

Sharjah (United Arab Emirates)	0–2	(Qatar) Al Sadd
	Report	Plata 9'; Bounedjah 60'

Sharjah Stadium, Sharjah
Attendance: 1,512
Referee: Hiroyuki Kimura (Japan)

4 December 2023
19:00 UTC+3

Al-Faisaly (Jordan)	2–1	(United Arab Emirates) Sharjah
Bani Hani 90'; Kamergi 90+8'	Report	Firas 34'

Amman International Stadium, Amman
Attendance: 1,343
Referee: Hanna Hattab (Syria)
4 December 2023
19:00 UTC+3

Al Sadd (Qatar)	2–2	(Uzbekistan) Nasaf
Uribe 5'; Bounedjah 90+4'	Report	Jighauri 83', 90'

Jassim bin Hamad Stadium, Al Rayyan
Attendance: 4,323
Referee: Ahmad Al-Ali (Kuwait)

=== Group C ===
Pos	Team	Pld	W	D	L	GF	GA	GD	Pts	Qualification	ITH	SEP	QWJ	AGK
1	(Saudi Arabia) Al-Ittihad	6	5	0	1	11	4	+7	15	Advance to round of 16	—	2–1	1–0	3–0
2	(Iran) Sepahan	6	3	1	2	16	8	+8	10 (Note: Ranked on head-to-head points: Sepahan 4, Al-Quwa Al-Jawiya 1.)	Advance to round of 16	0–3 (Note: The match was abandoned after Al-Ittihad walked off in protest due to the presence of a sculpture of Qasem Soleimani on the pitch. The match was awarded a 3–0 win to Al-Ittihad, with Sepahan also being fined $200,000 and banned from hosting its next three Asian Champions League matches at home.)	—	1–0	9–0
3	(Iraq) Al-Quwa Al-Jawiya	6	3	1	2	9	7	+2	10		2–0	2–2	—	3–2
4	(Uzbekistan) AGMK	6	0	0	6	5	22	−17	0		1–2	1–3	1–2	—

Source: AFC
Rules for classification: Tiebreakers
Notes:
18 September 2023
19:00 UTC+3

Al-Ittihad (Saudi Arabia)	3–0	(Uzbekistan) AGMK
Camara 11'; Romarinho 15', 42' (pen.)	Report

Prince Abdullah Al Faisal Stadium, Jeddah
Attendance: 13,897
Referee: Hiroyuki Kimura (Japan)
18 September 2023
19:00 UTC+3

Al-Quwa Al-Jawiya (Iraq)	2–2	(Iran) Sepahan
Jasim 26', 88'	Report	Daneshgar 30'; Ghorbani 67'

Franso Hariri Stadium, Erbil
Attendance: 10,327
Referee: Ma Ning (China)

2 October 2023
17:00 UTC+5

AGMK (Uzbekistan)	1–2	(Iraq) Al-Quwa Al-Jawiya
Hagh Nazari 81'	Report	Jasim 2'; Tursunov 48' (o.g.)

OKMK Sport Majmuasi, Olmaliq
Attendance: 6,498
Referee: Abdulrahman Al-Jassim (Qatar)
2 October 2023

Sepahan (Iran)	0–3 (Note: The match was abandoned due to the visiting team's protest over the presence of a sculpture of Qasem Soleimani on the pitch. The match was awarded as a 3–0 win to Al-Ittihad due to Sepahan's violation of the rules.)	(Saudi Arabia) Al Ittihad
	Report

Naghsh-e Jahan Stadium, Isfahan

23 October 2023
19:00 UTC+5

AGMK (Uzbekistan)	1–3	(Iran) Sepahan
Mirakhmadov 36'	Report	Rezaeian 32', 49'; Asadi 59'

OKMK Sport Majmuasi, Olmaliq
Attendance: 3,200
Referee: Omar Al-Ali (United Arab Emirates)
23 October 2023
19:00 UTC+3

Al-Ittihad (Saudi Arabia)	1–0	(Iraq) Al-Quwa Al-Jawiya
Hamdallah 90+4'	Report

King Abdullah Sports City, Jeddah
Attendance: 19,098
Referee: Mohammed Abdulla Hassan Mohamed (United Arab Emirates)

6 November 2023
19:30 UTC+3:30

Sepahan (Iran)	9–0	(Uzbekistan) AGMK
Ahmadzadeh 8'; Asadi 59'; Hosseinnejad 60', 90+3'; Ghorbani 62'; Rezaeian 71'; Alekasir 79', 87'; Moghanlou 82'	Report

Azadi Stadium (Note: After an investigation about displaying a sculpture of Qasem Soleimani during the home match against Ittihad FC, Sepahan were banned from playing three home matches of this competition at Naghsh-e-Jahan Stadium. Since Sepahan qualified for the knockout stage, this ban will include the home leg in the round of 16.), Tehran
Attendance: 4,721
Referee: Kim Jong-hyeok (South Korea)
6 November 2023
15:00 UTC+3

Al-Quwa Al-Jawiya (Iraq)	2–0	(Saudi Arabia) Al-Ittihad
Jasim 44'; Abdul-Raheem 52'	Report

Franso Hariri Stadium, Erbil
Attendance: 18,850
Referee: Ahmed Al-Kaf (Oman)

27 November 2023
21:00 UTC+5

AGMK (Uzbekistan)	1–2	(Saudi Arabia) Al-Ittihad
Boakye 78'	Report	Hamdallah 30', 34'

OKMK Sport Majmuasi, Olmaliq
Attendance: 10,171
Referee: Muhammad Taqi (Singapore)
27 November 2023
21:30 UTC+3:30

Sepahan (Iran)	1–0	(Iraq) Al-Quwa Al-Jawiya
Ahmadzadeh 4'	Report

Azadi Stadium, Tehran
Attendance: 10,450
Referee: Abdulrahman Al-Jassim (Qatar)

4 December 2023
21:00 UTC+3

Al-Ittihad (Saudi Arabia)	2–1	(Iran) Sepahan
Al-Amri 14'; Jota 69'	Report	Rezaeian 48'

King Abdul Aziz Stadium, Mecca
Attendance: 11,159
Referee: Ma Ning (China)
4 December 2023
15:00 UTC+3

Al-Quwa Al-Jawiya (Iraq)	3–2	(Uzbekistan) AGMK
Abdul-Amir 14'; Atchou 15'; Qasim 42'	Report	Mirakhmadov 62'; Boakye 90+4'

Franso Hariri Stadium, Erbil
Attendance: 563
Referee: Adham Makhadmeh (Jordan)

=== Group D ===
Pos	Team	Pld	W	D	L	GF	GA	GD	Pts	Qualification	HIL	NAV	NAS	MUM
1	(Saudi Arabia) Al-Hilal	6	5	1	0	16	2	+14	16	Advance to round of 16	—	1–1	2–1	6–0
2	(Uzbekistan) Navbahor	6	4	1	1	11	6	+5	13	Advance to round of 16	0–2	—	2–1	3–0
3	(Iran) Nassaji Mazandaran	6	2	0	4	7	10	−3	6		0–3	1–3	—	2–0
4	(India) Mumbai City	6	0	0	6	1	17	−16	0		0–2	1–2	0–2	—

Source: AFC
Rules for classification: Tiebreakers
18 September 2023
21:00 UTC+3

Al-Hilal (Saudi Arabia)	1–1	(Uzbekistan) Navbahor
Al-Bulaihi 90+10'	Report	Tabatadze 52'

King Fahd International Stadium, Riyadh
Attendance: 26,713
Referee: Mohammed Abdulla Hassan Mohamed (United Arab Emirates)
18 September 2023
19:30 UTC+5:30

Mumbai City (India)	0–2	(Iran) Nassaji Mazandaran
	Report	Hosseini 34'; Azadi 62'

Shree Shiv Chhatrapati Sports Complex, Pune
Attendance: 1,529
Referee: Shaun Evans (Australia)

2 October 2023
19:00 UTC+5

Navbahor (Uzbekistan)	3–0	(India) Mumbai City
Iskanderov 52'; Yakhshiboev 58'; Abdumannopov 88'	Report

Markaziy Stadium, Namangan
Attendance: 8,230
Referee: Nazmi Nasaruddin (Malaysia)
3 October 2023
19:30 UTC+3:30

Nassaji Mazandaran (Iran)	0–3	(Saudi Arabia) Al-Hilal
	Report	Mitrović 18'; Neymar 58'; Al-Shehri 90+3'

Azadi Stadium, Tehran
Attendance: 34,850
Referee: Ma Ning (China)

23 October 2023
21:00 UTC+5

Navbahor (Uzbekistan)	2–1	(Iran) Nassaji Mazandaran
Urunov 74'; Abdi 90+7' (o.g.)	Report	Azadi 44'

Markaziy Stadium, Namangan
Attendance: 8,263
Referee: Salman Falahi (Qatar)
23 October 2023
21:00 UTC+3

Al-Hilal (Saudi Arabia)	6–0	(India) Mumbai City
Mitrović 5', 67', 80'; Milinković-Savić 75'; Al-Breik 82'; Al-Malki 90+5'	Report

King Fahd International Stadium, Riyadh
Attendance: 10,046
Referee: Muhammad Taqi (Singapore)

6 November 2023
17:30 UTC+3:30

Nassaji Mazandaran (Iran)	1–3	(Uzbekistan) Navbahor
Azadi 68'	Report	Golban 7'; Urunov 21', 48'

Azadi Stadium, Tehran
Attendance: 2,700
Referee: Yusuke Araki (Japan)
6 November 2023
19:30 UTC+5:30

Mumbai City (India)	0–2	(Saudi Arabia) Al-Hilal
	Report	Michael 62'; Mitrović 85'

DY Patil Stadium, Navi Mumbai
Attendance: 30,023
Referee: Adham Makhadmeh (Jordan)

28 November 2023
21:00 UTC+5

Navbahor (Uzbekistan)	0–2	(Saudi Arabia) Al-Hilal
	Report	Malcom 68'; S. Al-Dawsari 85'

Markaziy Stadium, Namangan
Attendance: 10,923
Referee: Salman Falahi (Qatar)
28 November 2023
19:30 UTC+3:30

Nassaji Mazandaran (Iran)	2–0	(India) Mumbai City
Azadi 14'; Nongtdu 32' (o.g.)	Report

Azadi Stadium, Tehran
Attendance: 375
Referee: Hanna Hattab (Syria)

4 December 2023
19:00 UTC+3

Al-Hilal (Saudi Arabia)	2–1	(Iran) Nassaji Mazandaran
Michael 4'; S. Al-Dawsari 54'	Report	Rahmati 77'

Prince Faisal bin Fahd Stadium, Riyadh
Attendance: 7,141
Referee: Mohanad Qasim Sarray (Iraq)
4 December 2023
21:30 UTC+5:30

Mumbai City (India)	1–2	(Uzbekistan) Navbahor
El Khayati 15'	Report	Iskanderov 29'; Đokić 45+3'

Shree Shiv Chhatrapati Sports Complex, Pune
Attendance: 476
Referee: Nazmi Nasaruddin (Malaysia)

=== Group E ===
Pos	Team	Pld	W	D	L	GF	GA	GD	Pts	Qualification	NSR	PRS	DUH	IST
1	(Saudi Arabia) Al Nassr	6	4	2	0	13	7	+6	14	Advance to round of 16	—	0–0	4–3	3–1
2	(Iran) Persepolis	6	2	2	2	5	5	0	8		0–2	—	1–2	2–0
3	(Qatar) Al-Duhail	6	2	1	3	9	9	0	7		2–3	0–1	—	2–0
4	(Tajikistan) Istiklol	6	0	3	3	3	9	−6	3		1–1	1–1	0–0	—

Source: AFC
Rules for classification: Tiebreakers
19 September 2023
21:00 UTC+5

Istiklol (Tajikistan)	0–0	(Qatar) Al-Duhail
	Report

Pamir Stadium, Dushanbe
Attendance: 17,500
Referee: Ahmad Al-Ali (Kuwait)
19 September 2023
21:30 UTC+3:30

Persepolis (Iran)	0–2	(Saudi Arabia) Al Nassr
	Report	Esmaeilifar 62' (o.g.); Qassem 72'

Azadi Stadium, Tehran
Attendance: 0
Referee: Ilgiz Tantashev (Uzbekistan)

2 October 2023
21:00 UTC+3

Al Nassr (Saudi Arabia)	3–1	(Tajikistan) Istiklol
Ronaldo 66'; Talisca 72', 77'	Report	Sebai 44'

Al-Awwal Park, Riyadh
Attendance: 20,770
Referee: Ko Hyung-jin (South Korea)
2 October 2023
21:00 UTC+3

Al-Duhail (Qatar)	0–1	(Iran) Persepolis
	Report	Alishah 63'

Abdullah bin Khalifa Stadium, Doha
Attendance: 5,447
Referee: Hiroyuki Kimura (Japan)

24 October 2023
21:00 UTC+3

Al Nassr (Saudi Arabia)	4–3	(Qatar) Al-Duhail
Talisca 25'; Mané 56'; Ronaldo 61', 81'	Report	Ismaeel 63'; Ali 67'; Olunga 85'

Al-Awwal Park, Riyadh
Attendance: 20,752
Referee: Ahmed Al-Kaf (Oman)
24 October 2023
19:30 UTC+3:30

Persepolis (Iran)	2–0	(Tajikistan) Istiklol
Sadeghi 44', 71'	Report

Azadi Stadium, Tehran
Attendance: 36,450
Referee: Mohanad Qasim Sarray (Iraq)

7 November 2023
21:00 UTC+3

Al-Duhail (Qatar)	2–3	(Saudi Arabia) Al Nassr
Coutinho 8', 80' (pen.)	Report	Talisca 27', 37', 65'

Khalifa International Stadium, Al Rayyan
Attendance: 36,528
Referee: Ilgiz Tantashev (Uzbekistan)
7 November 2023
19:00 UTC+5

Istiklol (Tajikistan)	1–1	(Iran) Persepolis
Sebai 74'	Report	Torabi 29'

Pamir Stadium, Dushanbe
Attendance: 12,500
Referee: Ahmad Al-Ali (Kuwait)

27 November 2023
21:00 UTC+3

Al Nassr (Saudi Arabia)	0–0	(Iran) Persepolis
	Report

Al-Awwal Park, Riyadh
Attendance: 16,094
Referee: Ma Ning (China)
27 November 2023
19:00 UTC+3

Al-Duhail (Qatar)	2–0	(Tajikistan) Istiklol
Olunga 47', 89'	Report

Abdullah bin Khalifa Stadium, Doha
Attendance: 2,032
Referee: Nazmi Nasaruddin (Malaysia)

5 December 2023
19:30 UTC+3:30

Persepolis (Iran)	1–2	(Qatar) Al-Duhail
Zahedi 7'	Report	Muntari 9'; Olunga 83'

Azadi Stadium, Tehran
Attendance: 53,185
Referee: Jumpei Iida (Japan)
5 December 2023
21:00 UTC+5

Istiklol (Tajikistan)	1–1	(Saudi Arabia) Al Nassr
Dzhalilov 32'	Report	Ghareeb 50'

Pamir Stadium, Dushanbe
Attendance: 17,715
Referee: Mohammed Abdulla Hassan Mohamed (United Arab Emirates)

=== Group F ===
Pos	Team	Pld	W	D	L	GF	GA	GD	Pts	Qualification	UTD	JBH	LCS	KIT
1	(Thailand) Bangkok United	6	4	1	1	11	8	+3	13	Advance to round of 16	—	3–2	1–0	1–1
2	(South Korea) Jeonbuk Hyundai Motors	6	4	0	2	12	9	+3	12	Advance to round of 16	3–2	—	3–0	2–1
3	(Singapore) Lion City Sailors	6	2	0	4	5	9	−4	6		1–2	2–0	—	0–2
4	(Hong Kong) Kitchee	6	1	1	4	7	9	−2	4		1–2	1–2	1–2	—

Source: AFC
Rules for classification: Tiebreakers
20 September 2023
19:00 UTC+9

Jeonbuk Hyundai Motors (South Korea)	2–1	(Hong Kong) Kitchee
Hong Jeong-ho 6'; Han Kyo-won 61'	Report	Mikael 56'

Jeonju World Cup Stadium, Jeonju
Attendance: 2,931
Referee: Mooud Bonyadifard (Iran)
20 September 2023
20:00 UTC+8

Lion City Sailors (Singapore)	1–2	(Thailand) Bangkok United
Lopes 25'	Report	Everton 51'; Thitiphan 62'

Jalan Besar Stadium, Singapore
Attendance: 2,927
Referee: Sadullo Gulmurodi (Tajikistan)

4 October 2023
19:00 UTC+7

Bangkok United (Thailand)	3–2	(South Korea) Jeonbuk Hyundai Motors
Rungrath 26'; Ahn Hyeon-beom 58' (o.g.); Willen 82'	Report	Thossawat 19' (o.g.); Moon Seon-min 88'

Thammasat Stadium, Rangsit
Attendance: 2,190
Referee: Adel Al-Naqbi (United Arab Emirates)
4 October 2023
20:00 UTC+8

Kitchee (Hong Kong)	1–2	(Singapore) Lion City Sailors
Jantscher 87'	Report	Živković 14'; Lestienne 37'

Hong Kong Stadium, Hong Kong
Attendance: 3,077
Referee: Yoshimi Yamashita (Japan)

25 October 2023
19:00 UTC+9

Jeonbuk Hyundai Motors (South Korea)	3–0	(Singapore) Lion City Sailors
Amano 5'; Lionel 33' (o.g.); Moon Seon-min 57'	Report

Jeonju World Cup Stadium, Jeonju
Attendance: 4,872
Referee: Khamis Al-Marri (Qatar)
25 October 2023
20:00 UTC+8

Kitchee (Hong Kong)	1–2	(Thailand) Bangkok United
Jantscher 7'	Report	Rungrath 45+4'; Willen 52'

Hong Kong Stadium, Hong Kong
Attendance: 2,259
Referee: Majed Al-Shamrani (Saudi Arabia)

8 November 2023
18:00 UTC+8

Lion City Sailors (Singapore)	2–0	(South Korea) Jeonbuk Hyundai Motors
Živković 23', 55'	Report

Jalan Besar Stadium, Singapore
Attendance: 3,562
Referee: Mooud Bonyadifard (Iran)
8 November 2023
19:00 UTC+7

Bangkok United (Thailand)	1–1	(Hong Kong) Kitchee
Willen 27'	Report	Jantscher 70'

Thammasat Stadium, Rangsit
Attendance: 2,543
Referee: Ahmed Issa (United Arab Emirates)

29 November 2023
18:00 UTC+8

Kitchee (Hong Kong)	1–2	(South Korea) Jeonbuk Hyundai Motors
Jantscher 69'	Report	Moon Seon-min 2'; Song Min-kyu 38'

Hong Kong Stadium, Hong Kong
Attendance: 2,023
Referee: Akhrol Risqullaev (Uzbekistan)
29 November 2023
21:00 UTC+7

Bangkok United (Thailand)	1–0	(Singapore) Lion City Sailors
Rungrath 86'	Report

Thammasat Stadium, Rangsit
Attendance: 2,093
Referee: Casey Reibelt (Australia)

13 December 2023
18:00 UTC+8

Lion City Sailors (Singapore)	0–2	(Hong Kong) Kitchee
	Report	Van Huizen 11' (o.g.); Fernando 74'

Jalan Besar Stadium, Singapore
Attendance: 2,654
Referee: Ahmed Issa (United Arab Emirates)
13 December 2023
19:00 UTC+9

Jeonbuk Hyundai Motors (South Korea)	3–2	(Thailand) Bangkok United
Moon Seon-min 42'; Lee Dong-jun 76', 78'	Report	Wanchai 4'; Rungrath 85'

Jeonju World Cup Stadium, Jeonju
Attendance: 6,007
Referee: Khalid Al-Turais (Saudi Arabia)

=== Group G ===
Pos	Team	Pld	W	D	L	GF	GA	GD	Pts	Qualification	FMA	SHT	ICN	KAY
1	(Japan) Yokohama F. Marinos	6	4	0	2	12	7	+5	12 (Note: Head-to-head goal difference: Yokohama F. Marinos +1, Shandong Taishan 0, Incheon United −1.)	Advance to round of 16	—	3–0	2–4	3–0
2	(China) Shandong Taishan	6	4	0	2	14	7	+7	12	Advance to round of 16	0–1	—	3–1	6–1
3	(South Korea) Incheon United	6	4	0	2	14	9	+5	12		2–1	0–2	—	4–0
4	(Philippines) Kaya–Iloilo	6	0	0	6	4	21	−17	0		1–2	1–3	1–3	—

Source: AFC
Rules for classification: Tiebreakers
Notes:
19 September 2023
19:00 UTC+9

Yokohama F. Marinos (Japan)	2–4	(South Korea) Incheon United
Nishimura 17'; Miyaichi 43'	Report	Ichimori 8' (o.g.); Gerso Fernandes 37'; Hernandes 75', 79'

Nissan Stadium, Yokohama
Attendance: 7,010
Referee: Khalid Al-Turais (Saudi Arabia)
19 September 2023
20:00 UTC+8

Kaya–Iloilo (Philippines)	1–3	(China) Shandong Taishan
Gayoso 79'	Report	Moisés 63'; Pato 71'; Cryzan 90+5'

Rizal Memorial Stadium, Manila
Attendance: 1,728
Referee: Ammar Ashkanani (Kuwait)

3 October 2023
19:00 UTC+9

Incheon United (South Korea)	4–0	(Philippines) Kaya–Iloilo
Mugoša 6', 19' (pen.); Hernandes 36'; M'Poku 74'	Report

Incheon Football Stadium, Incheon
Attendance: 8,582
Referee: Abdulla Al-Marri (Qatar)
3 October 2023
20:00 UTC+8

Shandong Taishan (China)	0–1	(Japan) Yokohama F. Marinos
	Report	Mizunuma 37'

Jinan Olympic Sports Center Stadium, Jinan
Attendance: 43,783
Referee: Ahmed Issa (United Arab Emirates)

25 October 2023
19:00 UTC+9

Incheon United (South Korea)	0–2	(China) Shandong Taishan
	Report	Cryzan 58'; Fellaini 87'

Incheon Football Stadium, Incheon
Attendance: 7,277
Referee: Akhrol Risqullaev (Uzbekistan)
25 October 2023
19:00 UTC+9

Yokohama F. Marinos (Japan)	3–0	(Philippines) Kaya–Iloilo
Mizunuma 35'; Sugimoto 72'; Anderson Lopes 90+5'	Report

Nissan Stadium, Yokohama
Attendance: 7,524
Referee: Sadullo Gulmurodi (Tajikistan)

7 November 2023
18:00 UTC+8

Shandong Taishan (China)	3–1	(South Korea) Incheon United
Li Yuanyi 54'; Kweon Han-jin 65' (o.g.); Cryzan 75' (pen.)	Report	Kim Do-hyuk 90+2'

Jinan Olympic Sports Center Stadium, Jinan
Attendance: 20,723
Referee: Adel Al-Naqbi (United Arab Emirates)
7 November 2023
20:00 UTC+8

Kaya–Iloilo (Philippines)	1–2	(Japan) Yokohama F. Marinos
Horikoshi 39'	Report	Murakami 26'; Yan Matheus 87'

Rizal Memorial Stadium, Manila
Attendance: 956
Referee: Ammar Ashkanani (Kuwait)

28 November 2023
19:00 UTC+9

Incheon United (South Korea)	2–1	(Japan) Yokohama F. Marinos
Hong Si-hoo 11'; Hernandes 69'	Report	Élber 83'

Incheon Football Stadium, Incheon
Attendance: 5,712
Referee: Ammar Ashkanani (Kuwait)
28 November 2023
20:00 UTC+8

Shandong Taishan (China)	6–1	(Philippines) Kaya–Iloilo
Moisés 26', 56'; Cryzan 49', 68', 89'; Song Long 61'	Report	Gayoso 21'

Jinan Olympic Sports Center Stadium, Jinan
Attendance: 13,756
Referee: Mohammed Al-Hoaish (Saudi Arabia)

13 December 2023
17:00 UTC+9

Yokohama F. Marinos (Japan)	3–0	(China) Shandong Taishan
Élber 45+4'; Anderson Lopes 57'; Yan Matheus 64'	Report

Nissan Stadium, Yokohama
Attendance: 10,953
Referee: Sivakorn Pu-udom (Thailand)
13 December 2023
16:00 UTC+8

Kaya–Iloilo (Philippines)	1–3	(South Korea) Incheon United
Rota 53'	Report	Park Seung-ho 12'; Choi Woo-jin 25'; Kim Do-hyuk 90+4' (pen.)

Rizal Memorial Stadium, Manila
Attendance: 456
Referee: Ahmed Al-Kaf (Oman)

=== Group H ===
Pos	Team	Pld	W	D	L	GF	GA	GD	Pts	Qualification	VEN	MCY	ZHP	BUR
1	(Japan) Ventforet Kofu	6	3	2	1	11	8	+3	11	Advance to round of 16	—	3–3	4–1	1–0
2	(Australia) Melbourne City	6	2	3	1	8	6	+2	9		0–0	—	1–1	0–1
3	(China) Zhejiang	6	2	1	3	9	13	−4	7		2–0	1–2	—	3–2
4	(Thailand) Buriram United	6	2	0	4	9	10	−1	6		2–3	0–2	4–1	—

Source: AFC
Rules for classification: Tiebreakers
20 September 2023
17:00 UTC+7

Buriram United (Thailand)	4–1	(China) Zhejiang
Doumbouya 17'; Čaušić 22' (pen.), 45'; Pansa 57'	Report	Leonardo 45+8' (pen.)

Buriram Stadium, Buriram
Attendance: 20,635
Referee: Nazmi Nasaruddin (Malaysia)
20 September 2023
20:00 UTC+10

Melbourne City (Australia)	0–0	(Japan) Ventforet Kofu
	Report

Melbourne Rectangular Stadium, Melbourne
Attendance: 3,245
Referee: Salman Falahi (Qatar)

4 October 2023
20:00 UTC+8

Zhejiang (China)	1–2	(Australia) Melbourne City
Leonardo 19' (pen.)	Report	Behich 4'; Caputo 17'

Huzhou Olympic Sports Centre, Huzhou
Attendance: 18,798
Referee: Hanna Hattab (Syria)
4 October 2023
19:00 UTC+9

Ventforet Kofu (Japan)	1–0	(Thailand) Buriram United
Hasegawa 90'	Report

Japan National Stadium, Tokyo
Attendance: 11,802
Referee: Akhrol Risqullaev (Uzbekistan)

25 October 2023
18:00 UTC+8

Zhejiang (China)	2–0	(Japan) Ventforet Kofu
Possignolo 9'; Mushekwi 58'	Report

Huzhou Olympic Sports Centre, Huzhou
Attendance: 9,721
Referee: Kim Jong-hyeok (South Korea)
25 October 2023
17:00 UTC+7

Buriram United (Thailand)	0–2	(Australia) Melbourne City
	Report	Lopane 22'; Maclaren 41'

Buriram Stadium, Buriram
Attendance: 17,265
Referee: Omar Al-Ali (United Arab Emirates)

8 November 2023
19:00 UTC+9

Ventforet Kofu (Japan)	4–1	(China) Zhejiang
Utaka 17'; Getúlio 45+2'; Masahiro 58'; Torikai 89'	Report	Leonardo 50'

Japan National Stadium, Tokyo
Attendance: 12,256
Referee: Khamis Al-Marri (Qatar)
8 November 2023
20:00 UTC+11

Melbourne City (Australia)	0–1	(Thailand) Buriram United
	Report	Čaušić 86' (pen.)

Melbourne Rectangular Stadium, Melbourne
Attendance: 2,472
Referee: Majed Al-Shamrani (Saudi Arabia)

29 November 2023
20:00 UTC+8

Zhejiang (China)	3–2	(Thailand) Buriram United
Leonardo 27'; Andrijašević 77'; Possignolo 83'	Report	Vučkić 9'; Doumbouya 87'

Huzhou Olympic Sports Centre, Huzhou
Attendance: 8,918
Referee: Ilgiz Tantashev (Uzbekistan)
29 November 2023
19:00 UTC+9

Ventforet Kofu (Japan)	3–3	(Australia) Melbourne City
Inoue 8'; Torikai 43'; Miyazaki 85'	Report	Talbot 5'; Arslan 59' (pen.); Jakoliš 64'

Japan National Stadium, Tokyo
Attendance: 15,877
Referee: Mooud Bonyadifard (Iran)

12 December 2023
16:30 UTC+7

Buriram United (Thailand)	2–3	(Japan) Ventforet Kofu
Arthit 48'; Čaušić 54' (pen.)	Report	Hasegawa 24'; Utaka 38', 43'

Buriram Stadium, Buriram
Attendance: 15,563
Referee: Abdullah Jamali (Kuwait)
12 December 2023
20:30 UTC+11

Melbourne City (Australia)	1–1	(China) Zhejiang
Arslan 54'	Report	Mushekwi 90+9'

Princes Park, Melbourne
Attendance: 2,487
Referee: Kim Hee-gon (South Korea)

=== Group I ===
Pos	Team	Pld	W	D	L	GF	GA	GD	Pts	Qualification	KWF	UHD	JDT	BGP
1	(Japan) Kawasaki Frontale	6	5	1	0	17	6	+11	16	Advance to round of 16	—	1–0	5–0	4–2
2	(South Korea) Ulsan Hyundai	6	3	1	2	12	8	+4	10	Advance to round of 16	2–2	—	3–1	3–1
3	(Malaysia) Johor Darul Ta'zim	6	3	0	3	11	13	−2	9		0–1	2–1	—	4–1
4	(Thailand) BG Pathum United	6	0	0	6	9	22	−13	0		2–4	1–3	2–4	—

Source: AFC
Rules for classification: Tiebreakers
19 September 2023
19:00 UTC+9

Ulsan Hyundai (South Korea)	3–1	(Thailand) BG Pathum United
Ádám 28', 73', 78'	Report	Stewart 41'

Ulsan Munsu Football Stadium, Ulsan
Attendance: 3,788
Referee: Ahmed Al-Kaf (Oman)
19 September 2023
20:00 UTC+8

Johor Darul Ta'zim (Malaysia)	0–1	(Japan) Kawasaki Frontale
	Report	Marcinho 45'

Sultan Ibrahim Stadium, Johor Bahru
Attendance: 24,597
Referee: Abdulrahman Al-Jassim (Qatar)

3 October 2023
19:00 UTC+9

Kawasaki Frontale (Japan)	1–0	(South Korea) Ulsan Hyundai
Tachibanada 89'	Report

Kawasaki Todoroki Stadium, Kawasaki
Attendance: 9,382
Referee: Mohammed Al-Hoaish (Saudi Arabia)
3 October 2023
19:00 UTC+7

BG Pathum United (Thailand)	2–4	(Malaysia) Johor Darul Ta'zim
Cardozo 5' (pen.), 55'	Report	Arif 6', 78'; Bergson 14'; Muñiz 53'

BG Stadium, Pathum Thani
Attendance: 5,964
Referee: Mohammed Abdulla Hassan Mohamed (United Arab Emirates)

24 October 2023
19:00 UTC+9

Ulsan Hyundai (South Korea)	3–1	(Malaysia) Johor Darul Ta'zim
Jung Seung-hyun 5'; Ludwigson 12', 18'	Report	Bergson 53'

Ulsan Munsu Football Stadium, Ulsan
Attendance: 4,183
Referee: Alireza Faghani (Australia)
24 October 2023
19:00 UTC+7

BG Pathum United (Thailand)	2–4	(Japan) Kawasaki Frontale
Sergeev 45+1'; Cardozo 82' (pen.)	Report	Tono 14'; Tachibanada 52'; Marcinho 68'; Ominami 77'

BG Stadium, Pathum Thani
Attendance: 6,998
Referee: Mooud Bonyadifard (Iran)

7 November 2023
19:00 UTC+9

Kawasaki Frontale (Japan)	4–2	(Thailand) BG Pathum United
Wakizaka 16' (pen.), 40' (pen.); Yamamura 68'; Miyashiro 90+8'	Report	Chanathip 33', 41'

Kawasaki Todoroki Stadium, Kawasaki
Attendance: 9,441
Referee: Abdulrahman Al-Jassim (Qatar)
7 November 2023
20:00 UTC+8

Johor Darul Ta'zim (Malaysia)	2–1	(South Korea) Ulsan Hyundai
Heberty 44'; Akhyar 87'	Report	Esaka 69'

Sultan Ibrahim Stadium, Johor Bahru
Attendance: 19,684
Referee: Shaun Evans (Australia)

28 November 2023
17:00 UTC+7

BG Pathum United (Thailand)	1–3	(South Korea) Ulsan Hyundai
Sergeev 69'	Report	Jakkapan 20' (o.g.); Ludwigson 27'; Lee Myung-jae 62'

BG Stadium, Pathum Thani
Attendance: 3,563
Referee: Ahmed Al-Kaf (Oman)
28 November 2023
19:00 UTC+9

Kawasaki Frontale (Japan)	5–0	(Malaysia) Johor Darul Ta'zim
Ienaga 8'; Damião 50'; Marcinho 60'; Kobayashi 69'; Yamane 88'	Report

Kawasaki Todoroki Stadium, Kawasaki
Attendance: 9,274
Referee: Mohammed Abdulla Hassan Mohamed (United Arab Emirates)

12 December 2023
19:00 UTC+9

Ulsan Hyundai (South Korea)	2–2	(Japan) Kawasaki Frontale
Ádám 44', 53' (pen.)	Report	Tono 17'; Seko 31'

Ulsan Munsu Football Stadium, Ulsan
Attendance: 5,247
Referee: Alireza Faghani (Australia)
12 December 2023
18:00 UTC+8

Johor Darul Ta'zim (Malaysia)	4–1	(Thailand) BG Pathum United
Bergson 55' (pen.), 66'; Endrick 86'; Arif 90+2'	Report	Sergeev 28'

Sultan Ibrahim Stadium, Johor Bahru
Attendance: 9,886
Referee: Ma Ning (China)

=== Group J ===
Pos	Team	Pld	W	D	L	GF	GA	GD	Pts	Qualification	POH	RED	HAN	WTT
1	(South Korea) Pohang Steelers	6	5	1	0	14	5	+9	16	Advance to round of 16	—	2–1	2–0	3–1
2	(Japan) Urawa Red Diamonds	6	2	1	3	12	9	+3	7		0–2	—	6–0	2–1
3	(Vietnam) Hanoi FC	6	2	0	4	7	16	−9	6		2–4	2–1	—	2–1
4	(China) Wuhan Three Towns	6	1	2	3	8	11	−3	5		1–1	2–2	2–1	—

Source: AFC
Rules for classification: Tiebreakers
20 September 2023
20:00 UTC+8

Wuhan Three Towns (China)	2–2	(Japan) Urawa Red Diamonds
Zhang Xiaobin 10'; Davidson 62' (pen.)	Report	Linssen 55'; José Kanté 90+4'

Wuhan Sports Center, Wuhan
Attendance: 27,599
Referee: Omar Al-Ali (United Arab Emirates)
20 September 2023
19:00 UTC+7

Hanoi FC (Vietnam)	2–4	(South Korea) Pohang Steelers
Joel 53', 87'	Report	Damien Le Tallec 30' (o.g.); Yun Min-ho 34'; Kim In-sung 39', 49'

Mỹ Đình National Stadium, Hanoi
Attendance: 15,025
Referee: Alireza Faghani (Australia)

4 October 2023
19:00 UTC+9

Urawa Red Diamonds (Japan)	6–0	(Vietnam) Hanoi FC
Phạm Tuấn Hải 9' (o.g.); Scholz 19' (pen.); Takahashi 37'; Sekine 65'; José Kanté 70'; Ekanit 85'	Report

Saitama Stadium 2002, Saitama
Attendance: 10,333
Referee: Adham Makhadmeh (Jordan)
4 October 2023
19:00 UTC+9

Pohang Steelers (South Korea)	3–1	(China) Wuhan Three Towns
Shin Kwang-hoon 13'; Zeca 54', 90+3'	Report	Yakubu 10'

Pohang Steel Yard, Pohang
Attendance: 3,818
Referee: Mooud Bonyadifard (Iran)

25 October 2023
19:00 UTC+9

Urawa Red Diamonds (Japan)	0–2	(South Korea) Pohang Steelers
	Report	Jeong Jae-hee 22'; Goh Young-jun 49'

Saitama Stadium 2002, Saitama
Attendance: 13,970
Referee: Ilgiz Tantashev (Uzbekistan)
23 October 2023
20:00 UTC+8

Wuhan Three Towns (China)	2–1	(Vietnam) Hanoi FC
Wei Shihao 45'; Marcão 63'	Report	Phạm Tuấn Hải 87'

Wuhan Sports Center, Wuhan
Attendance: 19,112
Referee: Nazmi Nasaruddin (Malaysia)

8 November 2023
19:00 UTC+9

Pohang Steelers (South Korea)	2–1	(Japan) Urawa Red Diamonds
Zeca 66' (pen.); Kim In-sung 90+4'	Report	José Kanté 36'

Pohang Steel Yard, Pohang
Attendance: 4,953
Referee: Alireza Faghani (Australia)
8 November 2023
19:00 UTC+7

Hanoi FC (Vietnam)	2–1	(China) Wuhan Three Towns
Phạm Tuấn Hải 71', 90'	Report	He Chao 10'

Mỹ Đình National Stadium, Hanoi
Attendance: 9,888
Referee: Akhrol Risqullaev (Uzbekistan)

29 November 2023
19:00 UTC+9

Urawa Red Diamonds (Japan)	2–1	(China) Wuhan Three Towns
Scholz 37' (pen.); Kanté 90'	Report	Davidson 68'

Saitama Stadium 2002, Saitama
Attendance: 13,125
Referee: Majed Al-Shamrani (Saudi Arabia)
29 November 2023
19:00 UTC+9

Pohang Steelers (South Korea)	2–0	(Vietnam) Hanoi FC
Lee Ho-jae 33' (pen.); Ha Chang-rae 53'	Report

Pohang Steel Yard, Pohang
Attendance: 3,342
Referee: Adel Al-Naqbi (United Arab Emirates)

6 December 2023
20:00 UTC+8

Wuhan Three Towns (China)	1–1	(South Korea) Pohang Steelers
Lee Gyu-baeg 49' (o.g.)	Report	Lee Ho-jae 77'

Wuhan Sports Center, Wuhan
Attendance: 10,052
Referee: Abdulla Al-Marri (Qatar)
6 December 2023
19:00 UTC+7

Hanoi FC (Vietnam)	2–1	(Japan) Urawa Red Diamonds
Đào Văn Nam 53'; Phạm Tuấn Hải 87' (pen.)	Report	Linssen 65'

Mỹ Đình National Stadium, Hanoi
Attendance: 9,669
Referee: Sadullo Gulmurodi (Tajikistan)

== Ranking of second-placed teams ==
=== West Region ===
Pos	Grp	Team	Pld	W	D	L	GF	GA	GD	Pts	Qualification
1	D	(Uzbekistan) Navbahor	6	4	1	1	11	6	+5	13	Advance to round of 16
2	C	(Iran) Sepahan	6	3	1	2	16	8	+8	10	Advance to round of 16
3	A	(Saudi Arabia) Al-Fayha	6	3	0	3	12	10	+2	9	Advance to round of 16
4	B	(Qatar) Al Sadd	6	2	2	2	11	7	+4	8	
5	E	(Iran) Persepolis	6	2	2	2	5	5	0	8	

Source: AFC

=== East Region ===
Pos	Grp	Team	Pld	W	D	L	GF	GA	GD	Pts	Qualification
1	G	(China) Shandong Taishan	6	4	0	2	14	7	+7	12	Advance to round of 16
2	F	(South Korea) Jeonbuk Hyundai Motors	6	4	0	2	12	9	+3	12	Advance to round of 16
3	I	(South Korea) Ulsan Hyundai	6	3	1	2	12	8	+4	10	Advance to round of 16
4	H	(Australia) Melbourne City	6	2	3	1	8	6	+2	9	
5	J	(Japan) Urawa Red Diamonds	6	2	1	3	12	9	+3	7	

Source: AFC

== See also ==
- 2023–24 AFC Cup
