= Sodai =

Sodai may refer to:

== Education ==
- Soka University
- Waseda University

== People ==
- Sodai Hasukawa
- Tomokaze Sōdai
