= Fabián González (footballer) =

Colombian football player (born 1992)

Personal information
- Full name: Fabián Andrés González Lasso
- Date of birth: 23 November 1992 (age 33)
- Place of birth: Puerto Tejada, Colombia
- Height: 1.87 m (6 ft 2 in)
- Position: Forward

Team information
- Current team: Shonan Bellmare
- Number: 9

Youth career
- –2013: Deportivo Pasto

Senior career*
Years	Team	Apps	(Gls)
2013–2014	Deportivo Pasto	7	(0)
2015–2016	La Equidad	8	(1)
2016	Sport Áncash	20	(9)
2017	Ayacucho	11	(0)
2017–2018	Academia Cantolao	52	(21)
2019	Millonarios	33	(6)
2020	Atlético Nacional	15	(2)
2021–2023	Júbilo Iwata	52	(10)
2024	Ventforet Kofu	18	(2)
2024–2025	RB Omiya Ardija	40	(7)
2026–	Shonan Bellmare	3	(0)
- * Club domestic league appearances and goals as of 14 August 2026

Fabián Andrés González Lasso (born 23 November 1992) is a Colombian professional footballer who plays as a forward for J2 League club Shonan Bellmare.

== Career statistics ==
As of match played 29 November 2025

Appearances and goals by club, season and competition
Club	Season	League			National cup (Note: Includes Copa Colombia, Emperor's Cup)		Continental		Other		Total	
Club	Season	Division	Apps	Goals	Apps	Goals	Apps	Goals	Apps	Goals	Apps	Goals
Deportivo Pasto	2013	Categoría Primera A	7	0	5	0	0	0	0	0	12	0
Deportivo Pasto	2014	Categoría Primera A	0	0	0	0	—		0	0	0	0
Deportivo Pasto	Total		7	0	0	0	0	0	0	0	12	0
La Equidad	2015	Categoría Primera A	8	1	3	2	—		0	0	11	3
Sport Áncash	2016	Liga 2	20	9	0	0	—		0	0	20	9
Ayacucho	2017	Liga 1	11	0	0	0	—		0	0	11	0
Academia Cantolao	2017	Liga 1	13	0	0	0	—		0	0	13	0
Academia Cantolao	2018	Liga 1	39	21	0	0	—		0	0	39	21
Academia Cantolao	Total		52	21	0	0	0	0	0	0	52	21
Millonarios	2019	Categoría Primera A	33	6	5	2	—		0	0	38	8
Atlético Nacional	2020	Categoría Primera A	15	2	1	1	3 (Note: Appearances in Copa Sudamericana)	0	0	0	19	3
Júbilo Iwata	2021	J2 League	19	1	3	2	—		0	0	22	3
Júbilo Iwata	2022	J1 League	18	6	1	0	—		5 (Note: Appearance(s) in J.League Cup)	1	24	7
Júbilo Iwata	2023	J2 League	15	3	2	2	—		2	1	19	6
Júbilo Iwata	Total		52	10	6	4	—		7	2	65	16
Ventforet Kofu	2024	J2 League	18	2	2	0	2 (Note: Appearances in AFC Champions League)	0	0	0	22	2
RB Omiya Ardija	2024	J3 League	15	3	0	0	—		0	0	15	3
RB Omiya Ardija	2025	J2 League	25	4	0	0	—		1	0	26	4
RB Omiya Ardija	Total		40	7	0	0	—		1	0	41	7
Career total			241	55	20	7	5	0	6	1	272	63

== Honours ==
RB Omiya Ardija

- J3 League: 2024
