= Yuji Tsukada =

Japanese footballer and manager

Yuji Tsukada 塚田 雄二
Personal information
- Full name: Yuji Tsukada
- Date of birth: December 28, 1957 (age 68)
- Place of birth: Kofu, Japan
- Height: 1.63 m (5 ft 4 in)
- Position: Midfielder

Team information
- Current team: FC Imabari (manager)

Youth career
- 1973–1975: Nirasaki High School
- 1976–1979: Nippon Sport Science University

Senior career*
Years	Team	Apps	(Gls)
1980–1989	Kofu SC		

Managerial career
- 1995–1998: Ventforet Kofu
- 2000: Ventforet Kofu
- 2003: Cerezo Osaka
- 2005: Japan U-20
- 2006: Cerezo Osaka
- 2026: FC Imabari
- * Club domestic league appearances and goals

Yuji Tsukada (塚田 雄二, Tsukada Yuji; born December 28, 1957) is a Japanese former football player and manager.

== Playing career ==
Tsukada was born in Kofu on December 28, 1957. After graduating from Nippon Sport Science University, he played for his local club Kofu SC (later Ventforet Kofu) from 1980 to 1989.

== Coaching career ==
After retirement, in 1995 Tsukada became a manager for Japan Football League clubVentforet Kofu. In 1999, the club joined new league J2 League. However, he didn't have a coaching license for J2 League. So, former manager Susumu Katsumata became a manager to replace Tsukada. In 1999, Tsukada got a coaching license and came back as a manager in 2000. In 2002, he became an assistant coach for Cerezo Osaka. In October 2003, he became a manager to replace Akihiro Nishimura and he led to finalist at 2003 Emperor's Cup. He also managed the club in 2006 to replace Shinji Kobayashi.

== Managerial statistics ==
Team	From	To	Record				
Team	From	To	G	W	D	L	Win %
Ventforet Kofu	2000	2000	40	5	3	32	12.50
Cerezo Osaka	2003	2003	6	3	1	2	50.00
Cerezo Osaka	2006	2006	26	5	8	13	19.23
Total			72	13	12	47	18.06
