= Koya Hayashida =

Japanese footballer

Personal information
- Full name: Koya Hayashida
- Date of birth: 14 July 1999 (age 27)
- Place of birth: Ōita, Japan
- Height: 1.75 m (5 ft 9 in)
- Position: Midfielder

Team information
- Current team: Oita Trinita
- Number: 19

Youth career
- 2006–2014: Catiolla FC
- 2015–2017: JFA Academy Fukushima

College career
Years	Team	Apps	(Gls)
2018–2021	Kanto Gakuin University		

Senior career*
Years	Team	Apps	(Gls)
2022–2026	Ventforet Kofu	99	(1)
2026–	Oita Trinita	2	(0)
- * Club domestic league appearances and goals as of 16 August 2026

Koya Hayashida (林田 滉也, Hayashida Koya; born 14 July 1999) is a Japanese footballer and midfielder for Oita Trinita.

== Career ==
Koya made his debut for Ventforet against Oita Trinita on the 27 February 2022. He scored his first goal for the club against Júbilo Iwata on the 28 June 2023, scoring in the 32nd minute.

== Career statistics ==
=== Club ===
As of 26 February 2022.

Club	Season	League			National Cup		League Cup		Other		Total	
Club	Season	Division	Apps	Goals	Apps	Goals	Apps	Goals	Apps	Goals	Apps	Goals
Ventforet Kofu	2022	J2 League	1	0	0	0	0	0	0	0	1	0
Career total			1	0	0	0	0	0	0	0	1	0

== Honours ==
Ventforet Kofu

- Emperor's Cup: 2022
- Japanese Super Cup: 2023 (runners-up)
