= Susumu Katsumata (footballer) =

Japanese footballer and manager

Susumu Katsumata 勝俣 進
Personal information
- Full name: Susumu Katsumata
- Date of birth: February 17, 1956 (age 70)
- Place of birth: Fujiyoshida, Yamanashi, Japan
- Height: 1.68 m (5 ft 6 in)
- Position: Forward

Youth career
- 1971–1973: Kofu Technical High School
- 1974–1977: Hosei University

Senior career*
Years	Team	Apps	(Gls)
1978–1984	Kofu SC		

Managerial career
- 1994: Kofu SC
- 1999: Ventforet Kofu
- * Club domestic league appearances and goals

Susumu Katsumata (勝俣 進, Katsumata Susumu; born February 17, 1956) is a former Japanese football player and manager and politician.

== Playing career ==
Katsumata was born in Fujiyoshida on February 17, 1956. After graduating from Hosei University, he joined Kofu SC (later Ventforet Kofu) in 1978. He retired in 1984.

== Coaching career ==
After retirement, Katsumata became a manager for Kofu SC in 1994. He resigned at the end of the season and Yuji Tsukada became the new manager in 1995. In 1999, the club joined the new J2 League, and Katsumata became a manager to replace Tsukada because Tsukada did not have a coaching license for the J2 League.

== Political career ==
Katsumata was elected to the Fujiyoshida City Council in 1995 and served four terms for 16 years until 2011. In 2007, during his fourth term, he became the Speaker of the Fujiyoshida City Council. In April 2011, he ran for the Fujiyoshida City constituency in Yamanashi Prefectural Assembly; despite receiving 6,092 votes, he was defeated at third place.

In April 2015, he ran for mayor of Fujiyoshida and received 11,516 votes, but was defeated by the incumbent Shigeru Horiuchi, who received 18,413 votes. In April 2019, he ran again for mayor of Fujiyoshida, facing off against Horiuchi once more. He lost again but received 13,279 votes, an increase from the previous time.

== Managerial statistics ==
Team	From	To	Record				
Team	From	To	G	W	D	L	Win %
Ventforet Kofu	1999	1999	36	5	4	27	13.89
Total			36	5	4	27	13.89
