= Riku Nakayama =

Japanese footballer

Riku Nakayama 中山 陸
Personal information
- Full name: Riku Nakayama
- Date of birth: January 22, 2001 (age 25)
- Place of birth: Kanagawa, Japan
- Height: 1.74 m (5 ft 8 1/2 in)
- Position: Midfielder

Team information
- Current team: SC Sagamihara
- Number: 10

Youth career
- –2010: FC Carpa
- 2011–2013: SC Sagamihara
- 2015–2017: Tokai Univ. Sagami High School

Senior career*
Years	Team	Apps	(Gls)
2018–2025	Ventforet Kofu	50	(3)
2021	→ Kataller Toyama (loan)	1	(0)
2022	→ Matsumoto Yamaga (loan)	8	(1)
2025–	SC Sagamihara	34	(7)
- * Club domestic league appearances and goals as of 17 August 2026

Riku Nakayama (中山 陸, Nakayama Riku; born January 22, 2001) is a Japanese football player currently playing for SC Sagamihara.

== Career ==
Nakayama was born in Kanagawa Prefecture on January 22, 2001. He joined J2 League club Ventforet Kofu in 2018.
