= Sodai Hasukawa =

Japanese footballer

Personal information
- Full name: Sodai Hasukawa
- Date of birth: June 27, 1998 (age 28)
- Place of birth: Tokyo, Japan
- Height: 1.79 m (5 ft 10 1/2 in)
- Position: Centre back

Team information
- Current team: Shimizu S-Pulse
- Number: 4

Youth career
- FC Tokyo

Senior career*
Years	Team	Apps	(Gls)
2016–2024	FC Tokyo	6	(0)
2022	→ Iwate Grulla Morioka (loan)	11	(0)
2023	→ Ventforet Kofu (loan)	31	(0)
2024	→ Shimizu S-Pulse (loan)	9	(0)
2025-	Shimizu S-Pulse	45	(1)
- * Club domestic league appearances and goals as of 10 August 2026

Sodai Hasukawa (蓮川 壮大, Hasukawa Sōdai; born June 27, 1998) is a Japanese football player. He plays for Shimizu S-Pulse.

== Career ==
Sodai Hasukawa joined FC Tokyo in 2016. On May 22, he debuted in J3 League (v Kagoshima United FC).
