= Riku Iijima =

Japanese footballer

Personal information
- Date of birth: 17 November 1999 (age 26)
- Place of birth: Honjō, Saitama, Japan
- Height: 1.66 m (5 ft 5 in)
- Position: Forward

Team information
- Current team: Ventforet Kofu
- Number: 15

Youth career
- Kodama Departure FC
- Konan Minami SSS
- Kumagaya SC
- 2015–2017: Maebashi Ikuei High School

College career
Years	Team	Apps	(Gls)
2018–2021	Hosei University		

Senior career*
Years	Team	Apps	(Gls)
2021–	Ventforet Kofu	45	(3)
2025	→ Fukushima United FC (loan)	1	(0)

International career
2018	Japan U19	1	(0)
- * Club domestic league appearances and goals as of 1 January 2026

Riku Iijima (飯島 陸, Iijima Riku; born 17 November 1999) is a Japanese footballer currently playing as a forward for Ventforet Kofu.

== Career statistics ==
=== Club ===
As of 26 February 2022.

Club	Season	League			National Cup		League Cup		Other		Total	
Club	Season	Division	Apps	Goals	Apps	Goals	Apps	Goals	Apps	Goals	Apps	Goals
Ventforet Kofu	2021	J2 League	0	0	0	0	0	0	0	0	0	0
Ventforet Kofu	2022	J2 League	1	0	0	0	0	0	0	0	1	0
Career total			1	0	0	0	0	0	0	0	1	0
