= Élber (footballer, born 1992) =

Brazilian footballer (born 1992)

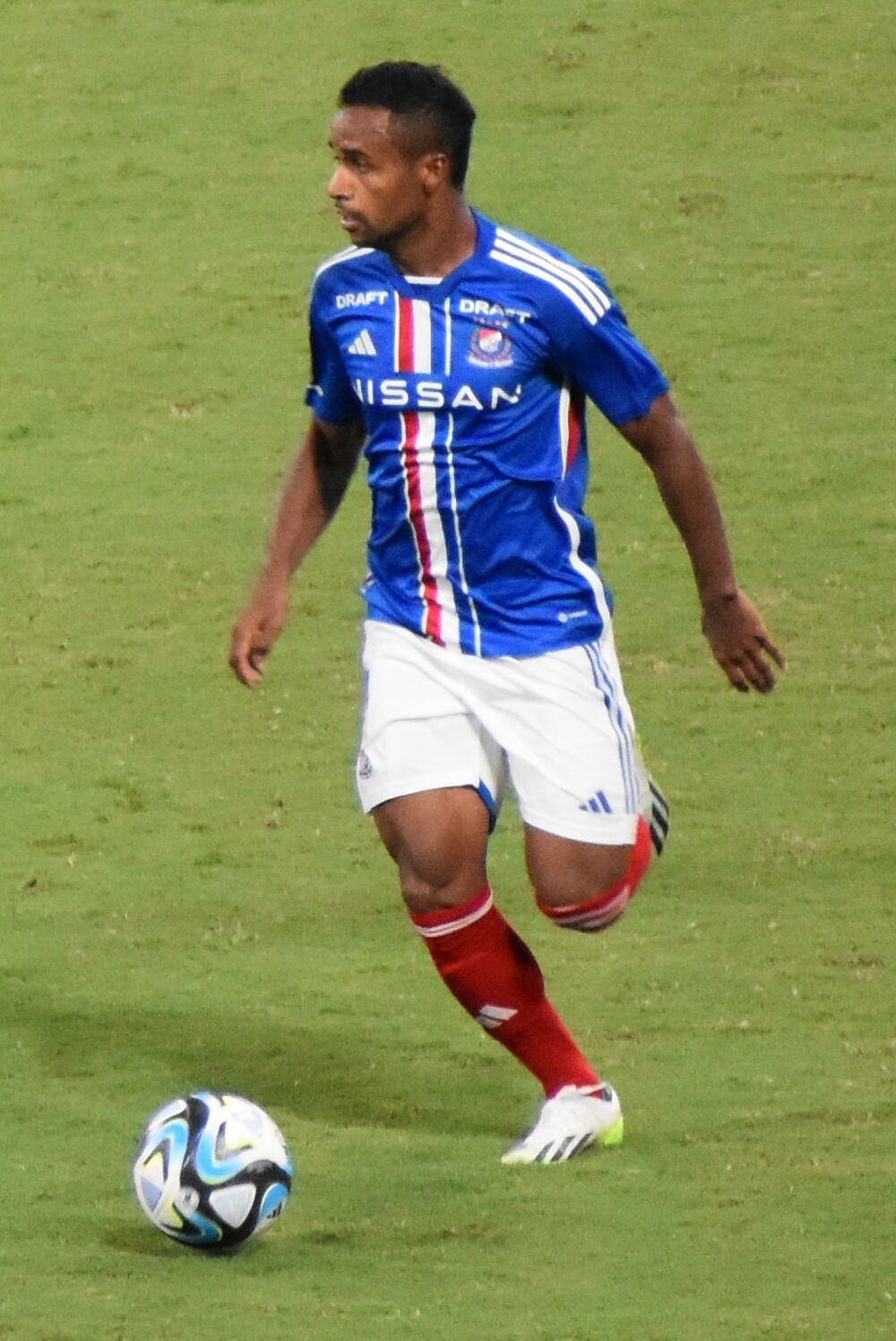
- Élber with Yokohama F. Marinos in 2023

Personal information
- Full name: José Élber Pimentel da Silva
- Date of birth: 27 May 1992 (age 34)
- Place of birth: Passo de Camaragibe, Alagoas, Brazil
- Height: 1.70 m (5 ft 7 in)
- Position: Winger

Team information
- Current team: Kashima Antlers
- Number: 18

Youth career
- 2007–2011: Cruzeiro

Senior career*
| Years | Team | Apps | (Gls) |
| 2011–2017 | Cruzeiro | 109 | (9) |
| 2014 | → Coritiba (loan) | 17 | (0) |
| 2015 | → Sport Recife (loan) | 38 | (10) |
| 2018–2020 | Bahia | 98 | (10) |
| 2021–2025 | Yokohama F. Marinos | 144 | (21) |
| 2025– | Kashima Antlers | 18 | (2) |
- * Club domestic league appearances and goals as of 9 August 2026

José Élber Pimentel da Silva (born 27 May 1992), simply known as Élber, is a Brazilian professional footballer who plays as a winger for Kashima Antlers.

He made his professional debut for Cruzeiro in a 1–1 away draw with Fluminense in the Campeonato Brasileiro on 7 September 2011

== Career statistics ==
As of 11 September 2025

Appearances and goals by club, season and competition
| Club | Season | League | | | State league | | National cup | | League cup | | Continental | | Other | | Total | |
| Club | Season | Division | Apps | Goals | Apps | Goals | Apps | Goals | Apps | Goals | Apps | Goals | Apps | Goals | Apps | Goals |
|---|---|---|---|---|---|---|---|---|---|---|---|---|---|---|---|---|
| Cruzeiro | 2011 | Série A | 11 | 0 | — | | — | | — | | — | | — | | 11 | 0 |
| Cruzeiro | 2012 | Série A | 11 | 2 | 7 | 0 | 2 | 0 | — | | — | | — | | 20 | 2 |
| Cruzeiro | 2013 | Série A | 11 | 1 | 9 | 2 | 2 | 0 | — | | — | | — | | 22 | 3 |
| Cruzeiro | 2014 | Série A | 1 | 0 | 7 | 0 | — | | — | | 3 | 0 | — | | 11 | 0 |
| Cruzeiro | 2016 | Série A | 13 | 2 | 11 | 1 | 4 | 0 | — | | — | | 2 | 1 | 30 | 4 |
| Cruzeiro | 2017 | Série A | 21 | 1 | 7 | 0 | 7 | 0 | — | | 1 | 0 | 3 | 0 | 39 | 1 |
| Cruzeiro | Total | | 68 | 6 | 41 | 3 | 15 | 0 | — | | 4 | 0 | 5 | 1 | 133 | 10 |
| Coritiba (loan) | 2014 | Série A | 17 | 0 | — | | 2 | 0 | — | | — | | — | | 19 | 0 |
| Sport Recife (loan) | 2015 | Série A | 25 | 5 | 13 | 5 | 3 | 0 | — | | 4 | 1 | 10 | 1 | 55 | 12 |
| Bahia | 2018 | Série A | 29 | 4 | 9 | 0 | 3 | 0 | — | | 5 | 0 | 10 | 1 | 56 | 5 |
| Bahia | 2019 | Série A | 31 | 3 | 6 | 0 | 8 | 1 | — | | 1 | 0 | 6 | 1 | 52 | 5 |
| Bahia | 2020 | Série A | 22 | 3 | 1 | 0 | 1 | 0 | — | | 8 | 2 | 12 | 3 | 44 | 8 |
| Bahia | Total | | 82 | 10 | 16 | 0 | 12 | 1 | — | | 14 | 2 | 28 | 5 | 152 | 18 |
| Yokohama F. Marinos | 2021 | J1 League | 37 | 5 | — | | 1 | 1 | 3 | 0 | — | | — | | 41 | 6 |
| Yokohama F. Marinos | 2022 | J1 League | 29 | 8 | — | | 0 | 0 | 1 | 0 | 5 (Note: Appearances in the AFC Champions League) | 0 | — | | 35 | 8 |
| Yokohama F. Marinos | 2023 | J1 League | 33 | 5 | — | | 0 | 0 | 7 | 0 | 4 | 2 | 1 (Note: Appearance in the Japanese Super Cup) | 0 | 45 | 7 |
| Yokohama F. Marinos | 2024 | J1 League | 27 | 2 | — | | 2 | 1 | 3 | 0 | 10 | 3 | 0 | 0 | 42 | 6 |
| Yokohama F. Marinos | 2025 | J1 League | 18 | 1 | — | | 1 | 0 | 0 | 0 | 4 | 0 | 0 | 0 | 23 | 1 |
| Yokohama F. Marinos | Total | | 144 | 21 | — | | 4 | 2 | 14 | 0 | 23 | 5 | 1 | 0 | 186 | 28 |
| Kashima Antlers | 2025 | J1 League | 3 | 0 | — | | 0 | 0 | 0 | 0 | — | | — | | 3 | 0 |
| Career total | | | 339 | 42 | 70 | 8 | 36 | 3 | 14 | 0 | 45 | 8 | 44 | 7 | 548 | 68 |

== Honours ==
Cruzeiro

- Campeonato Brasileiro Série A: 2013
- Campeonato Mineiro: 2014

Bahia

- Campeonato Baiano: 2019

Yokohama F. Marinos

- J1 League: 2022
- Japanese Super Cup: 2023

Kashima Antlers

- J1 League: 2025

Individual

- J.League Best XI: 2022
