= Tsubasa Shibuya =

Japanese footballer

Tsubasa Shibuya 渋谷 飛翔
Personal information
- Full name: Tsubasa Shibuya
- Date of birth: 27 January 1995 (age 31)
- Place of birth: Tokyo, Japan
- Height: 1.89 m (6 ft 2 in)
- Position: Goalkeeper

Team information
- Current team: Montedio Yamagata
- Number: 1

Youth career
- 2010–2012: Kanto Daiichi High School

Senior career*
Years	Team	Apps	(Gls)
2013–2016	Yokohama FC	25	(0)
2017–2022	Nagoya Grampus	4	(0)
2023–2024	Ventforet Kofu	29	(0)
2025	Yokohama FC	0	(0)
2025	→ Montedio Yamagata (loan)	7	(0)
2026–	Montedio Yamagata	14	(0)
- * Club domestic league appearances and goals as of 13 August 2026

Tsubasa Shibuya (渋谷 飛翔, Shibuya Tsubasa; born 27 January 1995 in Tokyo) is a Japanese footballer who plays as a goalkeeper for Montedio Yamagata.

== Career ==
=== Club ===
On 10 January 2017, Tsubasa signed for Nagoya Grampus.

In December 2022, it was announced that Shibuya would be joining J2 League club Ventforet Kofu for the 2023 season.

== Career statistics ==
=== Club ===
As of 11 March 2023.

Appearances and goals by club, season and competition
Club	Season	League			National Cup		League Cup		Other		Total	
Club	Season	Division	Apps	Goals	Apps	Goals	Apps	Goals	Apps	Goals	Apps	Goals
Japan			League		Emperor's Cup		J.League Cup		Other		Total	
Yokohama FC	2013	J2 League	3	0	1	0	–		–		4	0
Yokohama FC	2014	J2 League	3	0	0	0	–		–		3	0
Yokohama FC	2015	J2 League	0	0	0	0	–		–		0	0
Yokohama FC	2016	J2 League	19	0	0	0	–		–		19	0
Yokohama FC	Total		25	0	1	0	0	0	0	0	26	0
Nagoya Grampus	2017	J2 League	4	0	2	0	–		–		6	0
Nagoya Grampus	2018	J1 League	0	0	1	0	1	0	–		2	0
Nagoya Grampus	2019	J1 League	0	0	0	0	0	0	–		0	0
Nagoya Grampus	2020	J1 League	0	0	0	0	0	0	–		0	0
Nagoya Grampus	2021	J1 League	0	0	0	0	0	0	–		0	0
Nagoya Grampus	2022	J1 League	0	0	0	0	0	0	–		0	0
Nagoya Grampus	Total		4	0	3	0	1	0	0	0	8	0
Ventforet Kofu	2023	J2 League	0	0	0	0	–		–		0	0
Career total			29	0	4	0	1	0	0	0	34	0
