= Yamato Naito =

Japanese footballer

Personal information
- Date of birth: 14 July 2004 (age 22)
- Place of birth: Kōfu, Yamanashi, Japan
- Height: 1.79 m (5 ft 10 in)
- Position: Forward

Team information
- Current team: Ventforet Kofu
- Number: 10

Youth career
- Ishida FC
- Ventforet Kofu

Senior career*
Years	Team	Apps	(Gls)
2021–	Ventforet Kofu	64	(13)

International career
2019	Japan U15	2	(0)
2019–2020	Japan U16	2	(0)
2021–	Japan U17		
- * Club domestic league appearances and goals as of 17 August 2026

Yamato Naito (内藤 大和, Naito Yamato; born 14 July 2004) is a Japanese footballer currently playing as a forward for Ventforet Kofu.

== Career statistics ==
=== Club ===
As of 27 October 2021.

Club	Season	League			National Cup		League Cup		Other		Total	
Club	Season	Division	Apps	Goals	Apps	Goals	Apps	Goals	Apps	Goals	Apps	Goals
Ventforet Kofu	2021	J2 League	1	0	0	0	0	0	0	0	1	0
Career total			1	0	0	0	0	0	0	0	1	0
