= Nagi Matsumoto =

Japanese footballer

Nagi Matsumoto 松本 凪生
Personal information
- Date of birth: 4 September 2001 (age 25)
- Place of birth: Osaka, Japan
- Height: 1.71 m (5 ft 7 in)
- Position: Midfielder

Team information
- Current team: Sagan Tosu
- Number: 2

Youth career
- Kire Higashi FC
- 2014–2021: Cerezo Osaka

Senior career*
| Years | Team | Apps | (Gls) |
| 2018–2020 | Cerezo Osaka U-23 | 56 | (3) |
| 2021–2026 | Cerezo Osaka | 0 | (0) |
| 2021 | → Tochigi SC (loan) | 27 | (1) |
| 2022−2024 | → Ventforet Kofu (loan) | 59 | (4) |
| 2024 | → Montedio Yamagata (loan) | 14 | (0) |
| 2025 | → Sagan Tosu (loan) | 27 | (1) |
| 2026– | Sagan Tosu | 20 | (2) |

International career
| 2015 | Japan U15 | | |
| 2016 | Japan U16 | | |
| 2017 | Japan U17 | | |
| 2018–2019 | Japan U18 | 3 | (0) |
| 2019 | Japan U19 | 2 | (0) |
- * Club domestic league appearances and goals as of 14 August 2026

Nagi Matsumoto (松本 凪生, Matsumoto Nagi; born 4 September 2001) is a Japanese footballer who plays as a midfielder for J2 League club Sagan Tosu.

== Career ==
=== Cerezo Osaka ===
On 4 November 2019, Matsumoto was announced at Cerezo Osaka from the 2019 season.

Matsumoto made his league debut for Cerezo Osaka U-23s on 1 April 2018. He scored his first league goal against SC Sagamihara on 22 August 2020, scoring in the 44th minute.

=== Loan to Tochigi SC ===
On 7 January 2021, Matsumoto was announced at Tochigi SC on a one year loan. On 7 March 2021, he made his league debut against Blaublitz Akita on 7 March 2021. Matsumoto scored his first league goal against Machida Zelvia on 3 July 2021, scoring in the 54th minute.

=== Loan to Ventforet Kofu ===
On 28 December 2021, Matsumoto was announced at Ventforet Kofu on a one year loan. He scored on his league debut against Fagiano Okayama on 20 February 2022, scoring in the 35th minute. During his time at Ventforet Kofu, he won the 2022 Emperor's Cup.

=== Loan to Montedio Yamagata ===
On 27 December 2023, Matsumoto was announced on loan at Montedio Yamagata. He made his league debut against JEF United Chiba on 25 February 2024. On 6 January 2025, Matsumoto's loan with the club expired and he returned to Cerezo Osaka.

== Career statistics ==
=== Club ===
As of 17 March 2021.

| Club | Season | League | | | National Cup | | League Cup | | Other | | Total | |
| Club | Season | Division | Apps | Goals | Apps | Goals | Apps | Goals | Apps | Goals | Apps | Goals |
|---|---|---|---|---|---|---|---|---|---|---|---|---|
| Cerezo Osaka U-23 | 2018 | J3 League | 8 | 0 | – | | – | | 0 | 0 | 8 | 0 |
| Cerezo Osaka U-23 | 2019 | J3 League | 18 | 0 | – | | – | | 0 | 0 | 18 | 0 |
| Cerezo Osaka U-23 | 2020 | J3 League | 30 | 3 | – | | – | | 0 | 0 | 30 | 3 |
| Cerezo Osaka U-23 | Total | | 56 | 3 | 0 | 0 | 0 | 0 | 0 | 0 | 56 | 3 |
| Cerezo Osaka | 2021 | J1 League | 0 | 0 | 0 | 0 | 0 | 0 | 0 | 0 | 0 | 0 |
| Tochigi SC (loan) | 2021 | J2 League | 27 | 0 | 1 | 0 | 0 | 0 | 0 | 0 | 28 | 0 |
| Ventforet Kofu (loan) | 2022 | J2 League | 15 | 2 | 2 | 0 | 0 | 0 | 0 | 0 | 17 | 2 |
| Career total | | | 98 | 5 | 3 | 0 | 0 | 0 | 0 | 0 | 101 | 5 |

== Honours ==
=== Club ===
Ventforet Kofu

- Emperor's Cup: 2022
