= Iwana Kobayashi =

Japanese footballer

Personal information
- Date of birth: 17 October 1996 (age 30)
- Place of birth: Yamanashi, Japan
- Height: 1.78 m (5 ft 10 in)
- Position: Midfielder

Team information
- Current team: Ventforet Kofu
- Number: 6

Youth career
- 2004–2008: U SC
- 2009–2014: Ventforet Kofu

College career
Years	Team	Apps	(Gls)
2015–2018	Senshu University		

Senior career*
Years	Team	Apps	(Gls)
2019–	Ventforet Kofu	100	(0)
- * Club domestic league appearances and goals as of 17 August 2026

Iwana Kobayashi (小林 岩魚, Kobayashi Iwana; born 17 October 1997) is a Japanese footballer currently playing as a midfielder for Ventforet Kofu of J2 League.

== Career statistics ==
=== Club ===
As of 10 November 2020.

Club	Season	League			National Cup		League Cup		Other		Total	
Club	Season	Division	Apps	Goals	Apps	Goals	Apps	Goals	Apps	Goals	Apps	Goals
Ventforet Kofu	2019	J2 League	0	0	4 (Note: Appearances in the Emperor's Cup)	0	0	0	0	0	4	0
Ventforet Kofu	2020	J2 League	4	0	0	0	0	0	0	0	4	0
Career total			4	0	4	0	0	0	0	0	8	0
