= Kazuhiro Sato =

Japanese footballer

Kazuhiro Sato 佐藤 和弘
Personal information
- Full name: Kazuhiro Sato
- Date of birth: 28 September 1990 (age 36)
- Place of birth: Tajimi, Gifu, Japan
- Height: 1.74 m (5 ft 9 in)
- Position: Midfielder

Team information
- Current team: Ventforet Kofu
- Number: 26

Youth career
- –2002: Tajimi FC Esfuerso
- 2003–2005: Hokuryo Junior High School
- 2006–2008: Júbilo Iwata

College career
Years	Team	Apps	(Gls)
2009–2012	Chukyo University		

Senior career*
Years	Team	Apps	(Gls)
2013–2015	Zweigen Kanazawa	95	(16)
2016–2017	Mito HollyHock	71	(7)
2018–2019	Ventforet Kofu	65	(10)
2020–	Oita Trinita	5	(0)
2020–2022	→ Matsumoto Yamaga FC (loan)	80	(3)
2023–	Ventforet Kofu	75	(3)
- * Club domestic league appearances and goals as of 17 August 2026

Kazuhiro Sato (佐藤 和弘, Satō Kazuhiro; born 28 September 1990 in Tajimi, Gifu) is a Japanese footballer who plays for Ventforet Kofu.

== Club statistics ==
Updated to end of 2019 season.

Club performance			League		Cup		League Cup		Other		Total	
Season	Club	League	Apps	Goals	Apps	Goals	Apps	Goals	Apps	Goals	Apps	Goals
Japan			League		Emperor's Cup		J.League Cup		Other^{1}		Total	
2013	Zweigen Kanazawa	JFL	30	10	3	1	-		-		33	11
2014	Zweigen Kanazawa	J3 League	27	2	2	1	-		-		29	3
2015	Zweigen Kanazawa	J2 League	38	4	2	0	-		-		40	4
2016	Mito HollyHock	J2 League	32	6	2	0	-		-		34	6
2017	Mito HollyHock	J2 League	39	1	0	0	-		-		39	1
2018	Ventforet Kofu	J2 League	31	5	1	0	7	1	-		39	6
2019	Ventforet Kofu	J2 League	33	6	1	0	-		1	0	35	6
2020	Oita Trinita	J1 League	5	0	-		3	0	-		8	0
2020	Matsumoto Yamaga FC	J2 League			-		-		-			
Career total			235	39	11	2	10	1	1	0	260	42

^{1}includes J1/J2 play-offs.
