= Sho Araki =

Japanese footballer

Sho Araki 荒木 翔
Personal information
- Full name: Sho Araki
- Date of birth: August 25, 1995 (age 31)
- Place of birth: Kanagawa, Japan
- Height: 1.66 m (5 ft 5 1/2 in)
- Position: Midfielder

Team information
- Current team: Ventforet Kofu
- Number: 7

Youth career
- 2002–2007: Ohnodai SC
- 2008–2010: FC Coração
- 2011–2013: Aviation High School

College career
Years	Team	Apps	(Gls)
2014–2017	Kokushikan University		

Senior career*
Years	Team	Apps	(Gls)
2018–	Ventforet Kofu	213	(10)
- * Club domestic league appearances and goals as of 17 August 2026

Sho Araki (荒木 翔, Araki Shō; born August 25, 1995) is a Japanese football player currently playing for Ventforet Kofu.

== Playing career ==
Araki was born in Kanagawa Prefecture on August 25, 1995. After graduating from Kokushikan University, he joined J2 League club Ventforet Kofu in 2018.

== Career statistics ==
As of match played 14 July 2024

Appearances and goals by club, season and competition
Club	Season	League			Emperor's Cup		Continental		Other		Total	
Club	Season	Division	Apps	Goals	Apps	Goals	Apps	Goals	Apps	Goals	Apps	Goals
Ventforet Kofu	2018	J2 League	0	0	0	0	—		4 (Note: Appearance(s) in J.League Cup)	0	4	0
Ventforet Kofu	2019	J2 League	9	0	2	0	—		—		11	0
Ventforet Kofu	2020	J2 League	28	1	—		—		—		28	1
Ventforet Kofu	2021	J2 League	42	3	0	0	—		—		42	3
Ventforet Kofu	2022	J2 League	35	1	6	0	—		—		41	1
Ventforet Kofu	2023	J2 League	16	0	1	0	1 (Note: Appearance(s) in AFC Champions League)	0	0	0	18	0
Ventforet Kofu	2024	J2 League	18	0	1	0	1	0	—		20	0
Career Total			148	5	10	0	2	0	0	0	160	5

== Honours ==
=== Club ===
Ventforet Kofu

- Emperor's Cup: 2022
