= Eduardo Mancha =

Brazilian footballer (born 1995)

Personal information
- Full name: Eduardo Ferreira dos Santos
- Date of birth: 24 November 1995 (age 30)
- Height: 1.87 m (6 ft 1 1/2 in)
- Position: Defender

Team information
- Current team: Buriram United
- Number: 40

Senior career*
Years	Team	Apps	(Gls)
–2016	Ceará		
2016–2017	Jabaquara		
2017–2018	Guarani		
2018–2019	Birkirkara	26	(0)
2019–2020	Machine Sazi	26	(2)
2020–2022	Farense	40	(2)
2022–2025	Ventforet Kofu	78	(9)
2025–	Buriram United	6	(2)
- * Club domestic league appearances and goals as of 1 January 2026

Eduardo Ferreira dos Santos, more commonly known as Eduardo Mancha (born 24 November 1995) is a Brazilian football defender, who currently plays for Buriram United.

== Club career ==
=== Machine Sazi ===
He made his debut for Machine Sazi in first fixtures of 2019–20 Iran Pro League against Esteghlal.

== Honours ==
Ventforet Kofu

- Emperor's Cup: 2022

Buriram United

- Thai League 1: 2025–26
