= Kohei Kawata =

Japanese footballer

Personal information
- Full name: Kohei Kawata
- Date of birth: October 13, 1987 (age 39)
- Place of birth: Ōita, Ōita, Japan
- Height: 1.84 m (6 ft 1/2 in)
- Position: Goalkeeper

Team information
- Current team: Ventforet Kofu
- Number: 1

Youth career
- 2003–2005: Nirasaki High School

College career
Years	Team	Apps	(Gls)
2006–2009	Fukuoka University		

Senior career*
Years	Team	Apps	(Gls)
2010–2014	Gamba Osaka	1	(0)
2012	→ Avispa Fukuoka (loan)	10	(0)
2013	→ Ventforet Kofu (loan)	17	(0)
2015−	Ventforet Kofu	282	(0)
Medal record
Gamba Osaka
Winner	J1 League	2014
Runner-up	J1 League	2010
Winner	J.League Cup	2014
Winner	Emperor's Cup	2014
- * Club domestic league appearances and goals as of 17 August 2026

Kohei Kawata (河田 晃兵, Kawata Kōhei; born October 13, 1987) is a Japanese football player for Ventforet Kofu.

== Career statistics ==
Updated to end of 2018 season.

Appearances and goals by club, season and competition
Club	Season	League			Emperor's Cup		J.League Cup		Total	
Club	Season	Division	Apps	Goals	Apps	Goals	Apps	Goals	Apps	Goals
Gamba Osaka	2010	J1 League	0	0	0	0	0	0	0	0
Gamba Osaka	2011	J1 League	0	0	0	0	0	0	0	0
Avispa Fukuoka	2012	J2 League	10	0	2	0	-	-	12	0
Ventforet Kofu	2013	J1 League	17	0	4	0	0	0	21	0
Gamba Osaka	2014	J1 League	0	0	0	0	1	0	1	0
Ventforet Kofu	2015	J1 League	23	0	1	0	1	0	25	0
Ventforet Kofu	2016	J1 League	33	0	0	0	0	0	33	0
Ventforet Kofu	2017	J1 League	11	0	1	0	1	0	13	0
Ventforet Kofu	2018	J2 League	25	0	0	0	2	0	27	0
Career total			119	0	8	0	5	0	132	0

== Honours ==
=== Club ===
Ventforet Kofu

- Emperor's Cup: 2022
