= Riku Nozawa =

Japanese footballer

Personal information
- Date of birth: 7 December 1998 (age 27)
- Place of birth: Tochigi, Japan
- Height: 1.85 m (6 ft 1 in)
- Position: Defender

Team information
- Current team: Ventforet Kofu
- Number: 3

Youth career
- 2007–2010: Pal SC
- 2011–2013: Tokyo Verdy
- 2014–2016: Sano Nihon Univ. High School

College career
Years	Team	Apps	(Gls)
2017–2020	Sanno Institute of Management		

Senior career*
Years	Team	Apps	(Gls)
2021–	Ventforet Kofu	36	(1)
2024–2025	→ FC Gifu	43	(4)
- * Club domestic league appearances and goals as of 17 August 2026

Riku Nozawa (野澤 陸, Nozawa Riku; born 7 December 1998) is a Japanese footballer currently playing as a defender for Ventforet Kofu.

== Career statistics ==
=== Club ===
As of 27 June 2021.

Club	Season	League			National Cup		League Cup		Other		Total	
Club	Season	Division	Apps	Goals	Apps	Goals	Apps	Goals	Apps	Goals	Apps	Goals
Ventforet Kofu	2021	J2 League	1	0	1 (Note: Appearances in the Emperor's Cup)	0	0	0	0	0	2	0
Career total			1	0	1	0	0	0	0	0	2	0

== Honours ==
=== Club ===
Ventforet Kofu

- Emperor's Cup: 2022
