= Getúlio (footballer, born 1997) =

Brazilian footballer

Personal information
- Full name: Getúlio Wandelly Silva Timoteo
- Date of birth: 10 June 1997 (age 29)
- Place of birth: Olho d'Água do Casado, Brazil
- Height: 1.86 m (6 ft 1 in)
- Position: Forward

Team information
- Current team: Associação Atlética Internacional (Limeira) (loan)
- Number: 99

Youth career
- Tombense
- 2013–2018: Avaí

Senior career*
Years	Team	Apps	(Gls)
2014–2024	Tombense	0	(0)
2015–2019	→ Avaí (loan)	76	(18)
2019	→ Paços de Ferreira (loan)	0	(0)
2020–2021	→ Avaí (loan)	72	(14)
2022	→ Vasco da Gama (loan)	25	(3)
2022	→ Ventforet Kofu (loan)	4	(0)
2023	→ Ventforet Kofu (loan)	24	(3)
2024	→ Goiás (loan)	8	(0)
2024	→ CRB (loan)	12	(1)
2025	Chapecoense	13	(0)
2026-	Tombense	0	(0)
2026-	→ Associação Atlética Internacional (Limeira) (loan)	31	(7)
- * Club domestic league appearances and goals as of 9 November 2026

Getúlio Wandelly Silva Timoteo (born 10 June 1997), simply known as Getúlio, is a Brazilian footballer who plays as a forward for Associação Atlética Internacional (Limeira), on loan from Tombense.

== Club career ==
Born in Major Isidoro, Getúlio started his youth career with Tombense and arrived at the academy of Avaí in 2013. In 2018, he was promoted to the senior team and on 21 January, made his professional debut in the second round of Campeonato Catarinense in a 2–1 victory against Joinville. On 15 February, he scored his first ever goal for the club in a 3–1 victory against Brusque.

Although Getúlio suffered an injury in March, he recovered from it before a Copa do Brasil match against Fluminense. However, he was red-carded in the 17th minute after receiving his second yellow card. On 21 April, he scored his first Série B goal for the club in a 2–2 draw against Brasil de Pelotas. Following the club's promotion to 2019 Série A, his contract was extended for the upcoming season on 7 December.

== Club statistics ==
As of match played on 20 January 2019

Club	Season	League			Cup		State League		Total	
Club	Season	Division	Apps	Goals	Apps	Goals	Apps	Goals	Apps	Goals
Avaí	2018	Série B	27	7	5	0	12	4	44	11
Avaí	2019	Série A	0	0	0	0	2	1	2	1
Career total			27	7	5	0	14	5	46	12

== Honours ==
Avaí

- Campeonato Catarinense: 2019

Ventforet Kofu

- Emperor's Cup: 2022
