= Motoki Hasegawa =

Japanese footballer (born 1998)

Motoki Hasegawa 長谷川 元希
Personal information
- Full name: Motoki Hasegawa
- Date of birth: 10 December 1998 (age 27)
- Place of birth: Niiza, Saitama, Japan
- Height: 1.77 m (5 ft 10 in)
- Position: Midfielder

Team information
- Current team: V-Varen Nagasaki
- Number: 41

Youth career
- 2006–2010: Niiza Takeshino Kickers
- 2011–2016: Omiya Ardija

College career
Years	Team	Apps	(Gls)
2017–2020	Hosei University		

Senior career*
Years	Team	Apps	(Gls)
2020–2023	Ventforet Kofu	117	(22)
2024–2025	Albirex Niigata	71	(8)
2026–	V-Varen Nagasaki	15	(1)

International career
2014	Japan U16		
- * Club domestic league appearances and goals as of 21:58, 12 May 2026 (UTC)

Motoki Hasegawa (長谷川 元希, Hasegawa Motoki; born 10 December 1998) is a Japanese footballer who plays as a midfielder for J1 League club V-Varen Nagasaki.

== Club career ==
=== Ventforet Kofu ===
Hasegawa made his league debut for Ventforet against Mito HollyHock on the 29 July 2020. He scored his first two goals for the club against Matsumoto Yamaga on the 17 April 2021, scoring in the 16th and 35th minute.

On 4 October 2023, Hasegawa scored a 90th-minute injury time goal to secure a 1–0 home win against Thai champions, Buriram United in the 2023–24 AFC Champions League group stage.

=== Albirex Niigata ===
In December 2023, it was announced that Hasegawa would be joining J1 League club Albirex Niigata for the 2024 season.

== Career statistics ==
=== Club ===
As of 12 May 2026

Appearances and goals by club, season and competition
Club	Season	League			National cup (Note: Includes Emperor Cup)		League cup (Note: Includes J.League Cup)		Continental		Other		Total	
Club	Season	Division	Apps	Goals	Apps	Goals	Apps	Goals	Apps	Goals	Apps	Goals	Apps	Goals
Hosei University	2019	–			2	0	–		–		–		2	0
Ventforet Kofu	2020	J2 League	2	0	0	0	–		0	0	0	0	2	0
Ventforet Kofu	2021	J2 League	36	7	1	0	–		0	0	0	0	37	7
Ventforet Kofu	2022	J2 League	40	8	5	0	–		0	0	0	0	45	8
Ventforet Kofu	2023	J2 League	39	7	2	0	–		5 (Note: Appearances in AFC Champions League Elite)	2	1 (Note: Appearance in Japanese Super Cup)	0	47	9
Ventforet Kofu	Total		117	22	8	0	0	0	5	2	1	0	131	24
Albirex Niigata	2024	J1 League	33	1	1	0	5	1	–		–		39	2
Albirex Niigata	2025	J1 League	38	7	2	0	2	0	–		–		42	7
Albirex Niigata	Total		71	8	3	0	7	1	0	0	0	0	81	9
V-Varen Nagasaki	2026	J1 (100)	15	1	–		–		–		–		15	1
Career total			203	31	13	0	7	1	5	2	1	0	229	34

== Honours ==
=== Club ===
Ventforet Kofu

- Emperor's Cup: 2022
- Japanese Super Cup: 2023 (runners-up)
