= Jumma Miyazaki =

Japanese professional footballer

Jumma Miyazaki 宮崎 純真
Personal information
- Date of birth: 10 April 2000 (age 26)
- Place of birth: Fuchū, Tokyo, Japan
- Height: 1.73 m (5 ft 8 in)
- Position: Forward

Team information
- Current team: Tokushima Vortis
- Number: 19

Youth career
- 2008–2012: Fuchu Shinmachi FC
- 2013–2015: FC Tama
- 2016–2018: Yamanashi Gakuin High School

Senior career*
Years	Team	Apps	(Gls)
2019–2025	Ventforet Kofu	164	(15)
2025–	Tokushima Vortis	27	(6)
- * Club domestic league appearances and goals as of 14 August 2026

Jumma Miyazaki (宮崎 純真, Miyazaki Jumma; born 10 April 2000) is a Japanese professional footballer who plays as a forward for Tokushima Vortis.

== Early life ==
Jumma was born in Fuchū. He played youth football for Yamanashi Gakuin High School.

== Career ==
After winning the national championship with Yamanashi Gakuin High School, Miyazaki joined Ventforet Kofu in 2019.

Jumma made his league debut for Ventforet against Tochigi on 12 May 2019. He scored his first goal for Ventforet against Montedio Yamagata on 8 June 2019, scoring in the 62nd minute.

== Career statistics ==
Updated to 1 January 2022.

Appearances and goals by club, season and competition
Club	Season	League			Emperor's Cup		J. League Cup		Total	
Club	Season	Division	Apps	Goals	Apps	Goals	Apps	Goals	Apps	Goals
Ventforet Kofu	2019	J2 League	11	1	3	1	–		14	2
Ventforet Kofu	2020	J2 League	20	1	–		–		20	1
Ventforet Kofu	2021	J2 League	23	4	0	0	–		23	4
Career total			54	6	3	1	0	0	57	7
