= Masahiro Sekiguchi =

Japanese footballer

Masahiro Sekiguchi 関口 正大
Personal information
- Date of birth: 21 April 1998 (age 28)
- Place of birth: Niigata, Niigata, Japan
- Height: 1.72 m (5 ft 8 in)
- Position: Right-back

Team information
- Current team: Albirex Niigata
- Number: 30

Youth career
- 2004–2010: Club F3
- 2011–2013: FC Ikarashi
- 2014–2016: Niigata Meikun High School

College career
Years	Team	Apps	(Gls)
2017–2020	Hosei University		

Senior career*
Years	Team	Apps	(Gls)
2020–2024	Ventforet Kofu	143	(4)
2025–2026	V-Varen Nagasaki	41	(1)
2026–	Albirex Niigata	9	(1)
- * Club domestic league appearances and goals as of 11 August 2026

Masahiro Sekiguchi (関口 正大, Sekiguchi Masahiro; born 21 April 1998) is a Japanese footballer who plays as a right-back for J2 League club Albirex Niigata.

== Career ==
On 10 June 2020, it was announced that Sekiguchi would join Ventforet Kofu from the 2021 season. He left the club after five years at Kofu, winning the Emperor's Cup for the first time in their history in 2022.

On 28 December 2024, Sekiguchi was announced at V-Varen Nagasaki from the 2025 season.

In September 2026, Sekiguchi transferred to J2 League club Albirex Niigata.

== Career statistics ==
=== Club ===
As of 4 November 2026.

Appearances and goals by club, season and competition
Club	Season	League			National cup (Note: Includes Emperor's Cup)		League cup (Note: Includes J.League Cup)		Continental		Total	
Club	Season	Division	Apps	Goals	Apps	Goals	Apps	Goals	Apps	Goals	Apps	Goals
Hosei University	2019	–			4	0	–		–		4	0
Ventforet Kofu	2020	J2 League	2	0	0	0	0	0	0	0	2	0
Ventforet Kofu	2021	J2 League	34	2	0	0	0	0	0	0	34	2
Ventforet Kofu	2022	J2 League	37	0	4	0	0	0	0	0	41	0
Ventforet Kofu	2023	J2 League	34	1	2	0	0	0	8 (Note: Appearances in AFC Champions League)	1	44	2
Ventforet Kofu	2024	J2 League	36	1	3	0	2	0	0	0	41	1
Ventforet Kofu	Total		143	4	9	0	2	0	8	1	162	5
V-Varen Nagasaki	2025	J2 League	24	1	2	0	0	0	–		26	1
V-Varen Nagasaki	2026	J1 (100)	11	0	–		–		–		11	0
V-Varen Nagasaki	2026–27	J1 League	6	0	1	1	1	0	–		8	1
V-Varen Nagasaki	Total		41	1	3	1	1	0	0	0	45	2
Albirex Niigata	2026–27	J2 League	9	1	–		0	0	–		9	1
Career total			193	6	16	1	3	0	8	1	220	8

== Honours ==
=== Club ===
Ventforet Kofu

- Emperor's Cup: 2022
