= Yoshiki Torikai =

Japanese footballer

Yoshiki Torikai 鳥海 芳樹
Personal information
- Date of birth: 1 August 1998 (age 28)
- Place of birth: Fujisawa, Kanagawa, Japan
- Height: 1.65 m (5 ft 5 in)
- Position: Midfielder

Team information
- Current team: Mito HollyHock
- Number: 11

Youth career
- 2006–2010: Muraoka Kickers
- 2011–2013: Muraoka Junior High School
- 2014–2016: Toko Gakuen High School

College career
Years	Team	Apps	(Gls)
2017–2020	Toin University of Yokohama		

Senior career*
Years	Team	Apps	(Gls)
2021–2025	Ventforet Kofu	171	(27)
2026–	Mito HollyHock	14	(2)
- * Club domestic league appearances and goals as of 11 August 2026

Yoshiki Torikai (鳥海 芳樹, Torikai Yoshiki; born 1 August 1998) is a Japanese footballer currently playing as a midfielder for J1 League club Mito HollyHock.

== Career statistics ==
=== Club ===
As of 22 April 2026.

Appearances and goals by club, season and competition
Club	Season	League			National cup (Note: Includes Emperors Cup)		League cup (Note: Includes J.League Cup)		Continental		Other		Total	
Club	Season	Division	Apps	Goals	Apps	Goals	Apps	Goals	Apps	Goals	Apps	Goals	Apps	Goals
Toin University of Yokohama	2019	–			1	0	–		–		–		1	0
Toin University of Yokohama	2020	–			2	0	–		–		–		2	0
Toin University of Yokohama	Total		0	0	3	0	0	0	0	0	0	0	3	0
Ventforet Kofu	2021	J2 League	30	4	1	0	0	0	0	0	0	0	31	4
Ventforet Kofu	2022	J2 League	37	4	6	1	0	0	0	0	0	0	43	5
Ventforet Kofu	2023	J2 League	33	4	2	0	0	0	5 (Note: Appearances in AFC Champions League Elite)	2	1 (Note: Appearance in Japanese Super Cup)	0	41	6
Ventforet Kofu	2024	J2 League	38	6	2	1	2	0	2	0	0	0	44	7
Ventforet Kofu	2025	J2 League	33	9	2	0	1	0	0	0	0	0	36	9
Ventforet Kofu	Total		171	27	13	2	3	0	7	2	1	0	195	31
Mito HollyHock	2026	J1 (100)	7	2	–		–		–		–		7	2
Career total			178	29	16	2	3	0	7	2	1	0	205	33

== Honours ==
=== Club ===
Ventforet Kofu

- Emperor's Cup: 2022
