= Ventforet Kofu =

Japanese football club

Ventforet Kofu ヴァンフォーレ甲府
- Full name: Ventforet Kofu Football Club
- Nickname: Ventforet
- Short name: VFK
- Founded: 1965; 61 years ago as Kofu Club
- Stadium: JIT Recycle Ink Stadium, Kōfu
- Capacity: 15,853
- Chairman: Kazuyuki Umino
- Manager: Hiroki Shibuya
- League: J2 League
- 2025: J2 League, 13th of 20
- Website: www.ventforet.jp
Home colours	Away colours

Ventforet Kofu (ヴァンフォーレ甲府, Vanfōre Kōfu) is a Japanese professional football club from Kōfu in Yamanashi Prefecture. The team currently competes in the J2 League, Japanese second tier of professional football, hosting their home matches in the JIT Recycle Ink Stadium, located in Kōfu.

Ventforet has won a total of 1 J2 League title and 1 Emperor's Cup in their history.

== Name origin ==
The word "Ventforet" is a compound formed from two French root words: "vent" (wind) and "forêt" (forest). The name alludes to the famous phrase Fū-rin-ka-zan (風林火山) that Takeda Shingen, a prominent Kōfu-based daimyō in the Sengoku period, emblazoned on his war banners. The phrase contains four similies: as swift as the wind; as silent as a forest; as fierce as fire; as immovable as a mountain.

== History ==
=== Kofu Club (1965–1994) ===
The club was founded in 1965 when the old boys' club of Kofu Dai-ichi High School, the Kakujo Club, started to recruit graduates of other high schools with the intention of promotion to the Japan Soccer League and was formed as Kofu Club. Kofu Club was formed by volunteers, unlike other mainstream football clubs at that time in Japan, whose players were mostly the employees of their sponsoring companies.

Kofu Club joined the newly formed JSL Division 2 in 1972. They stayed there until the conclusion of the league in 1992 when it became a founding member of the former Japan Football League.

=== Ventforet Kofu (1995–present) ===
The club was renamed Ventforet Kofu in 1995 and joined J.League Division 2 in 1999 when it was formed. The club survived a difficult period between 1999 and 2001, when it suffered from financial troubles as well as miserable results on the pitch, including a streak of twenty-five consecutive losses. Ventforet finished bottom for three seasons in succession and was dubbed as "Excess baggage of J2".

Ventforet improved in 2002, and in 2005 finished third, gaining promotion to the Japanese first division by winning the promotion/relegation play-offs against Kashiwa Reysol. However, the team was relegated with a week remaining in the 2007 season.

At the end of 2010 season, the team was promoted a second time. Despite having striker Mike Havenaar contend for the Top Scorer award in division one the following year, the club was relegated again at the end of 2011. However, it returned after only one year's absence as champions of division two, Ventforet's first championship in its thirty-six-year history. Ventforet remained in J.League 1 until 2017, consistently staying as a top tier J.League 2 team after relegation

=== Emperor's Cup win (2022) ===
Ventforet participated in the 2022 Emperor's Cup, earning a direct second round entry alongside all J1 and J2 League teams. Following a 5–1 win over Okayama-based International Pacific University, they then only faced J1 League opponents the rest of the tournament. They would beat Hokkaido Consadole Sapporo and Sagan Tosu away from home by 2–1 and 3–1 respectively to advance to the quarter finals, in a stage which they had been on 4 times without ever getting past it. In another match away from home, now against Avispa Fukuoka, the game would be tied up 1–1 and head into extra time, with Yoshiki Torikai scoring in the 97th minute to bring Kofu to their first Emperor's Cup Semi-final, where they would beat Kashima Antlers thanks to Jumma Miyazaki's goal in the 37th minute to reach their first Emperor's Cup Final.

In the final, Kofu were up against Sanfrecce Hiroshima, a J1 team who hadn't won an Emperor's Cup since 1969 (including amateur era). Kazushi Mitsuhira scored in the 26th minute to give Kofu the lead, before Sanfrecce midfielder Takumu Kawamura tied the match in the 84th minute. After a scoreless extra time, the final was decided in a penalty shootout. After Sanfrecce missed their fourth penalty, 42-year-old Hideomi Yamamoto scored Kofu's fifth and final penalty to win the Emperor's Cup champions for the first time. Their win marked the first time that a J2 League team had won the Emperor's Cup since FC Tokyo in 2011, the fourth J2 champion overall, and the first occasion in which the winner was not the second division champions. This qualified them for the AFC Champions League while playing in their domestic second-tier league.

=== AFC Champions League debut (2023) ===
On 20 September 2023, Ventforet played their first AFC Champions League official match against Australian side Melbourne City for the competition's group stage. Playing away at Melbourne Rectangular Stadium with few of their usual starting players, the match ended in a 0–0 draw, earning them their first point and clean sheet in this competition. On 4 October 2023, Ventforet picked up their first Champions League win against Thai champions Buriram United. Motoki Hasegawa scored in stoppage time as Ventforet won 1–0 at home, On 12 December 2023, Ventforet clinched their spots in the Round of 16 after a 2–3 away win against Buriram United. This marks the first time a team qualified for the knockout phase of the AFC Champions League though not playing in their nation's top division. Ventforet than faced against Korean giants, Ulsan Hyundai in the Round of 16, however, they were knocked out from the tournament after suffering a 5–1 on aggregate defeat.

==== 2023–24 AFC Champions League - Group H ====
Pos	Team	Pld	W	D	L	GF	GA	GD	Pts	Qualification	VEN	MCY	ZHP	BUR
1	(Japan) Ventforet Kofu	6	3	2	1	11	8	+3	11	Advance to round of 16	—	3–3	4–1	1–0
2	(Australia) Melbourne City	6	2	3	1	8	6	+2	9		0–0	—	1–1	0–1
3	(China) Zhejiang	6	2	1	3	9	13	−4	7		2–0	1–2	—	3–2
4	(Thailand) Buriram United	6	2	0	4	9	10	−1	6		2–3	0–2	4–1	—

Source: AFC
Rules for classification: Tiebreakers

== League and cup record ==
Champions	Runners-up	Third place	Promoted	Relegated

League													J.League Cup	Emperor's Cup	AFC Champions League
Year	Division	Tier	Pos.	P	W	D	L	F	A	GD	Pts	Attendance/G	J.League Cup	Emperor's Cup	AFC Champions League
1992	former JFL; Div. 2	3	5th	18	9	1	8	26	29	-3	28		Not eligible		Not eligible
1993	former JFL; Div. 2	3	9th	18	6	-	12	15	37	-22	-		Not eligible		Not eligible
1994	former JFL	2	14th	30	9	-	21	36	74	-38	-		Not eligible	2nd round	Not eligible
1995	former JFL	2	9th	30	14	-	16	54	54	0	43		Not eligible		Not eligible
1996	former JFL	2	11th	30	11	-	19	50	56	-6	33		Not eligible	2nd round	Not eligible
1997	former JFL	2	6th	30	19	-	11	59	41	18	52		Not eligible	3rd round	Not eligible
1998	former JFL	2	4th	30	22	-	8	74	40	34	59		Not eligible	4th round	Not eligible
1999	J2	2	10th	36	5	4	27	32	85	-53	18	1,469	1st round	2nd round	Not eligible
2000	J2	2	11th	40	5	3	32	31	84	-53	18	1,850	1st round	4th round	Not eligible
2001	J2	2	12th	44	8	2	34	38	98	-60	25	3,130	1st round	3rd round	Not eligible
2002	J2	2	7th	44	16	10	18	51	55	-4	58	4,914	Not eligible	3rd round	Not eligible
2003	J2	2	5th	44	19	12	13	58	46	12	69	5,796	Not eligible	3rd round	Not eligible
2004	J2	2	7th	44	15	13	16	51	46	5	58	6,370	Not eligible	4th round	Not eligible
2005	J2	2	3rd	44	19	12	13	78	64	14	69	6,931	Not eligible	4th round	Not eligible
2006	J1	1	15th	34	12	6	15	42	64	-22	42	12,211	Group Stage	Quarter Finals	Not eligible
2007	J1	1	17th	34	7	6	21	33	65	-32	27	13,734	Quarter Finals	5th round	Not eligible
2008	J2	2	7th	42	15	14	13	56	47	9	59	10,354	Not eligible	4th round	Not eligible
2009	J2	2	4th	51	28	13	10	76	46	30	97	11,059	Not eligible	4th round	Not eligible
2010	J2	2	2nd	36	19	13	4	71	40	31	70	12,431	Not eligible	3rd round	Not eligible
2011	J1	1	16th	34	9	19	6	42	63	-21	33	12,106	1st round	3rd round	Not eligible
2012	J2	2	1st	42	24	4	14	63	35	28	86	10,407		2nd round	Not eligible
2013	J1	1	15th	34	8	13	13	30	41	-11	37	12,614	Group Stage	Quarter Finals	Not eligible
2014	J1	1	13th	34	9	11	14	27	31	-4	41	12,171	Group Stage	Round of 16	Not eligible
2015	J1	1	13th	34	10	17	7	26	43	-17	37	11,612	Group Stage	4th round	Not eligible
2016	J1	1	14th	34	7	17	10	32	58	-26	31	10,833	Group Stage	2nd round	Not eligible
2017	J1	1	16th	34	7	16	11	23	39	-16	32	10,829	Group Stage	2nd round	Not eligible
2018	J2	2	9th	42	16	15	11	56	46	10	59	7,384	Quarter Finals	Quarter Finals	Not eligible
2019	J2	2	5th	42	20	11	11	64	40	24	71	8,273	Not eligible	Quarter Finals	Not eligible
2020 †	J2	2	4th	42	16	17	9	50	41	9	65	2,485	Not eligible	Did not qualify	Not eligible
2021 †	J2	2	3rd	42	23	11	8	65	38	27	80	4,325	Not eligible	2nd round	Not eligible
2022	J2	2	18th	42	11	15	16	47	54	-7	48	4,930	Not eligible	Winner	Not eligible
2023	J2	2	8th	42	18	10	14	60	50	10	64	7,485	Not eligible	Round of 16	Round of 16
2024	J2	2	14th	38	12	9	17	54	57	-3	45	8,274	Quarter final	2nd round	
2025	J2	2	13th	38	11	11	16	37	45	-8	44	8,389	2nd round	3rd round	
2026	J2	2	4th	18	10	3	5	21	13	8	35	8,139	N/A	N/A	
2026-27	J2	2	TBD	38									TBD	TBD	

Key

- Pos. = Position in league; P = Games played; W = Games won; D = Games drawn; L = Games lost; F = Goal scored; A = Goals conceded; GD = Goal difference; Pts = Points gained
- † 2020 & 2021 seasons attendances reduced by COVID-19 worldwide pandemic
- Attendance/G = Average home league attendance
- Source: J.League Data Site

== Honours ==
Ventforet Kofu honours
Honour	No.	Years
Kantō Soccer League	2	1969, 1970
J2 League	1	2012
Emperor's Cup	1	2022

== League history ==
- Kanto League: 1967–71 (as Kofu Club)
- Division 2 (JSL Div. 2): 1972–91 (as Kofu Club)
- Division 3 (former JFL Div. 2): 1992–93 (as Kofu Club)
- Division 2 (former JFL): 1994–98 (Kofu Club until 1994, Ventforet Kofu since 1995)
- Division 2 (J.League Div. 2): 1999–05
- Division 1 (J.League Div. 1): 2006–07
- Division 2 (J.League Div. 2): 2008–10
- Division 1 (J.League Div. 1): 2011
- Division 2 (J.League Div. 2): 2012
- Division 1 (J.League Div. 1): 2013–2017
- Division 2 (J.League Div. 2): 2018–

== Current squad ==
As of 2 October 2026.

Note: Flags indicate national team as defined under FIFA eligibility rules; some limited exceptions apply. Players may hold more than one non-FIFA nationality.

No.	Pos.	Nation	Player
1	GK	JPN	Kohei Kawata
2	DF	JPN	Miki Inoue
3	DF	JPN	Riku Nozawa
4	DF	JPN	Hideomi Yamamoto
5	DF	JPN	Taiju Ichinose
6	MF	JPN	Iwana Kobayashi
7	MF	JPN	Sho Araki
8	MF	JPN	Kojiro Yasuda (on loan from FC Tokyo)
9	FW	JPN	Kazushi Mitsuhira
10	FW	JPN	Yamato Naito
11	MF	JPN	Kotatsu Kumakura
13	MF	JPN	Yukito Murakami
14	FW	JPN	Kazushi Fujii (on loan from RB Omiya Ardija)
15	MF	JPN	Taiyo Yoneda
16	MF	JPN	Hiroya Sueki
17	DF	JPN	Shun Fukumoto
19	MF	JPN	Hayata Mizuno
20	MF	JPN	Hikaru Endo
22	DF	JPN	Yuta Koide
23	FW	ITA	Michele Staccioli

No.	Pos.	Nation	Player
24	MF	JPN	Keisuke Sato
25	MF	JPN	Yuto Hiratsuka
26	MF	JPN	Kazuhiro Sato
27	MF	JPN	Seigo Takei
29	FW	JPN	Koki Oshima
31	GK	KOR	Lee Min-ki
32	FW	JPN	Hiroki Maezawa ^{DSP}
33	GK	JPN	Kodai Yamauchi
34	GK	JPN	Haruto Goto ^{Type 2}
35	DF	JPN	Ryo Toyoda ^{DSP}
36	MF	JPN	Yugen Okajima ^{Type 2}
37	DF	JPN	Kenshin Kawai ^{Type 2}
39	MF	JPN	Hokuto Matsuyama ^{DSP}
41	MF	JPN	Takuya Wada
44	DF	JPN	Keita Fukui (on loan from RB Omiya Ardija)
47	MF	JPN	Tomoki Hosaka
95	DF	BRA	Holneiker Mendes
96	MF	JPN	Atsushi Kurokawa
97	GK	JPN	John Higashi

== Club officials ==
Club staff for 2025 season

Position	Name
Manager	(Japan) Hiroki Shibuya
Coaches	(Japan) Katsutomo Oshiba (Japan) Yuji Yokoyama (Singapore) Nazri Nasir
Goalkeeper coach	(Japan) Yuji Nakagawa
Physical coach	(Brazil) José Fernando
Analysis coach	(Japan) Yoshiki Hara (Japan) Kanta Yonekura
Chief trainer	(Japan) Hiroaki Maeda
Trainers	(Japan) Masaya Tanaka (Japan) Yuto Mogi (Japan) Naoaki Higashi
Physiotherapist	(Japan) Takayuki Ando
Athletic trainer	(Japan) Shigeru Asahina
Competent	(Japan) Yoshiki Tsuruta
Deputy officer	(Japan) Tetsuro Ajisawa
Interpreter	(Japan) Bruno Iwasaki

== Managerial history ==
Manager	Nationality	Tenure	
Manager	Nationality	Start	Finish
Susumu Katsumata	Japan	1 January 1994	31 January 1995
Yūji Tsukada	Japan	1 February 1995	31 January 1999
Susumu Katsumata	Japan	1 February 1999	31 January 2000
Yūji Tsukada	Japan	1 February 2000	31 January 2001
Luis dos Reis	Brazil	1 February 2001	31 January 2002
Takeshi Ōki	Japan	1 February 2002	31 January 2003
Hideki Matsunaga	Japan	1 February 2003	31 January 2005
Takeshi Ōki	Japan	1 February 2005	31 January 2008
Takayoshi Amma	Japan	1 February 2008	31 January 2010
Kazuo Uchida	Japan	1 February 2010	31 January 2011
Toshiya Miura	Japan	1 February 2011	7 August 2011
Satoru Sakuma	Japan	8 August 2011	31 December 2011
Hiroshi Jōfuku	Japan	1 February 2012	31 January 2015
Yasuhiro Higuchi	Japan	1 February 2015	13 May 2015
Satoru Sakuma	Japan	13 May 2015	31 December 2016
Tatsuma Yoshida	Japan	1 February 2017	30 April 2018
Nobuhiro Ueno	Japan	1 May 2018	31 January 2019
Akira Itō	Japan	1 February 2019	31 January 2022
Tatsuma Yoshida	Japan	1 February 2022	31 January 2023
Yoshiyuki Shinoda	Japan	1 February 2023	1 July 2024
Shinji Otsuka	Japan	2 July 2024	Current

== Kit evolution ==
Home kits - 1st
1999 - 2000	2001 - 2002	2003	2004	2005
2006	2007 - 2008	2009 - 2010	2011-2012	2013 - 2014
2015 - 2016	2017 - 2018	2019 - 2020	2021	2022
2023	2024	2025 -		

Away kits - 2nd
1999 - 2000	2001 - 2002	2003	2004	2005
2006	2007 - 2008	2009 - 2010	2011 - 2012	2013 - 2014
2015 - 2016	2017 - 2018	2019 - 2020	2021	2022
2023	2024	2025 -		

Third kits
2015 Summer	2016 Summer	2017 Summer	2018 Summer	2019 Summer
2020; Summer	2021; Summer	2022; Limited	Special for Champions League; Home	Special for Champions League; Away
2024; SUMMER; Vivid × Vital				
