= Hirose (surname) =

Hirose (written: 広瀬, 廣瀬, 弘世) is a Japanese surname. Notable people with the surname include:

- Akihito Hirose (広瀬 章人; born 1987), Japanese professional shogi player
- Akira Hirose (廣瀬 明), Japanese engineer
- Akito Hirose (born 1999), Canadian professional ice hockey player
- Alice Hirose (広瀬 アリス; born 1994), Japanese actress and former model
- Ayakazu Hirose (廣瀬 文一), member of the National Board of Governors of the Boy Scouts of Nippon
- Ayako Hirose (広瀬 綾子; born 1969), Japanese former professional tennis player
- Eriko Hirose (廣瀬 栄理子; born 1985), Japanese badminton player
- Etsuko Hirose (広瀬 悦子; born 1979), Japanese classical pianist
- Gen Hirose (弘世 現; 1904–1996), Japanese businessman
- George Hirose (born 1957), Japanese-American photographer
- Hatsuko Hirose (弘世 初子; born 1937), Japanese diver
- Hirose Heijirō (広瀬 平治郎; 1865–1940), Japanese professional Go player
- Hideyuki Hirose (廣瀬 英行; born 1989), Japanese sprinter
- Iwao Hirose (広瀬 巌; born 1970), Japanese philosopher and economist
- Jun Hirose (廣瀬 純; born 1979), Japanese former professional baseball player
- Junko Hirose (広瀬 順子; born 1990), Japanese Paralympic judoka, Paralympic gold medalist
- Hirose Katsuhiko (広瀬 勝比古; 1862–1920), Japanese vice admiral
- Katsusada Hirose (広瀬 勝貞; born 1942), Japanese politician
- Kei Hirose (廣瀬 慧; born 1995), Japanese professional footballer
- Kenichi Hirose (広瀬 健一; 1964–2018), one of the perpetrators of the Sarin gas attack on the Tokyo subway
- Kenta Hirose (広瀬 健太; born 1992), Japanese footballer
- Kohmi Hirose (広瀬 香美; born 1966), Japanese singer and songwriter
- Koji Hirose (廣瀬 浩二; born 1984), Japanese retired footballer
- Makoto Hirose (広瀬 誠; born 1976), Japanese Paralympic judoka, Paralympic silver medalist
- Masashi Hirose (広瀬 正志; born 1947), Japanese voice actor
- Megumi Hirose (広瀬 めぐみ; born 1966), Japanese politician and lawyer
- Miyoko Hirose (広瀬 美代子; born 1959), Japanese former volleyball player, Olympic bronze medalist
- Rikuto Hirose (広瀬 陸斗; born 1995), Japanese professional footballer
- Ruby Hirose (1904–1960), American biochemist and bacteriologist
- Ryo Hirose (廣瀬 崚; born 2000), Japanese cross-country skier
- Ryōhei Hirose (廣瀬 量平; 1930–2008), Japanese composer
- Sadahiko Hirose (廣瀬 禎彦; born 1943), Japanese businessman
- Saihei Hirose (広瀬 宰平; 1828–1914), Japanese businessman
- Sakura Hirose (広瀬 桜; born 1997), Japanese professional footballer
- Shoichi Hirose (広瀬 正一; 1918–1990s), Japanese actor
- Suzu Hirose (広瀬 すず; born 1998), Japanese actress and model
- Taka Hirose (広瀬 隆; born 1967), Japanese musician, member of rock band Feeder
- Takashi Hirose (swimmer) (廣瀬 隆; 1923–2002), American swimmer
- Takashi Hirose (writer) (広瀬 隆; born 1943), Japanese writer
- Takayuki Hirose (廣瀬 隆喜; born 1984), Japanese boccia player, Paralympic silver medalist
- Takeo Hirose (廣瀨 武夫; 1868–1904), Imperial Japanese Navy career officer
- Hirose Tansō (広瀬 淡窓; 1782–1856), Japanese Edo Period neo-Confucian scholar
- Taro Hirose (born 1996), Canadian professional ice hockey player
- Tetsuzo Hirose (広瀬 鉄蔵; born 1939), Japanese rower
- Tomoki Hirose (廣瀬 智紀; born 1987), Japanese actor
- Tomoyuki Hirose (廣瀬 智行; born 1997), Japanese footballer
- Toshiaki Hirose (廣瀬 俊朗; born 1981), Japanese rugby union player
- Tsutomu Hirose (広瀬 務; born 1963), Japanese former rugby union player
- Yoshinori Hirose (広瀬 叔功; born 1936), Japanese former professional baseball player
- Yutaka Hirose (広瀬 裕; born 1962), Japanese actor and voice actor
- Yuuki Hirose (広瀬 ゆうき; born 1993), Japanese actress and singer
- Yūya Hirose (広瀬 裕也; born 1996), Japanese voice actor
