= 2025 Emperor's Cup =

Tournament details
- Country: Japan
- Dates: 24 May – 22 November
- Teams: 88

Final positions
- Champions: Machida Zelvia (1st title)
- Runners-up: Vissel Kobe
- Champions League Two: Machida Zelvia

Tournament statistics
- Matches played: 87
- Goals scored: 264 (3.03 per match)
- Attendance: 373,643 (4,295 per match)
- Top goal scorer(s): Shota Fujio (Machida Zelvia); 5 goals

The 2025 Emperor's Cup or the JFA 105th Japan Football Championship (Japanese: 天皇杯 JFA 第105回全日本サッカー選手権大会) was the 105th edition of the annually known contested cup. It featured 88 teams representing the prefectural football associations, university football federation, J1 League and the J2 League.

Vissel Kobe were the title holders, winning the 2024 final against Gamba Osaka, just before becoming 2025 J1 League champions, winning the domestic double. They joined the competition along other J1 and J2 League teams in the second round. They were beaten in the final by Machida Zelvia, who won their first ever major title.

Due to the participation of Urawa Red Diamonds in the 2025 FIFA Club World Cup, they were given automatic qualification to the Round of 16 of the Emperor's Cup, as the Club World Cup takes place between June and July, just when the rest of the J1 League teams are participating in the second and third round of the Emperor's Cup.

== Calendar ==
The schedule for the first round to the Round of 16 was announced on 4 February 2025.

Round	Date	Backup date(s)	Matches	Clubs	New entries this round
First round	24–25 May	28 May	27	54 (47+6+1) → 27	47 prefectural qualification cup winners; 6 2025 J2 League clubs; 1 amateur designated team
Second round	11 June	18 June	32	60 (27+19+14) → 30	19 2025 J1 League clubs; 14 2025 J2 League clubs
Third round	16 July	23 July	15	30 → 15	None
Round of 16	6 August	13 August	8	16 (15+1) → 8	Urawa Red Diamonds
Quarter-finals	27 August	10 September	4	8 → 4	None
Semi-finals	16 November	–	2	4 → 2	None
Final	22 November	–	1	2 → 1	None

== Qualifying rounds ==
As the norm, only J1 and J2 League clubs qualify directly for the first round. All the teams from lower divisions (starting from the J3 League) who wants to qualify to the Emperor's Cup (exception being made to the JFA-seeded team), have to undergo a prefectural qualification, with regulations and schedules varying from one association to another. In total, there are 47 prefectural cup qualifications, with the winners of each prefectural cup earning their right to play in the Emperor's Cup, with all of them assigned to start the competition in the first round.

In bold, it will be displayed the teams that won each final, and not necessarily the home team. All the matches are played on a neutral venue.

11 May Hokkaido Final	**BTOP Hokkaido**	**2–1**	Hokkaido Tokachi Sky Earth	Iwamizawa
14:00 JST				Stadium: Iwamizawa City Okayama Sports Field

11 May Aomori Final	**ReinMeer Aomori**	**0–0** (a.e.t.) (**6–5** p)	Vanraure Hachinohe	Hachinohe
13:00 JST				Stadium: Prifoods Stadium

11 May Iwate Final	**Iwate Grulla Morioka**	**2–1** (a.e.t.)	Fuji University	Morioka
14:00 JST				Stadium: Iwagin Stadium

11 May Miyagi Final	**Sendai University**	**3–1**	Cobaltore Onagawa	Rifu
13:30 JST				Stadium: Miyagi Co-op Megumino Soccer Field

20 April Akita Final	**North Asia University**	**2–0**	Resaca Nishime	Akita
11:00 JST				Stadium: Akita Central Park Sports Ground

6 April Yamagata Final	**Oyama SC**	**4–2**	FC Parafrente Yonezawa	Yamagata
11:00 JST				Stadium: Yamagata Municipal Stadium

11 May Fukushima Final	**Fukushima United**	**10–0**	Higashi Nippon Int. University	Fukushima
13:00 JST				Stadium: Toho Minna no Stadium

10 May Ibaraki Final	**University of Tsukuba**	**1–0**	Ryutsu Keizai University	Hitachinaka
13:00 JST				Stadium: Hitachinaka City Stadium

11 May Tochigi Final	**Tochigi SC**	**2–0**	Tochigi City FC	Utsunomiya
13:00 JST				Stadium: Tochigi Green Stadium

11 May Gunma Final	**Thespa Gunma**	**6–0**	Jobu University	Maebashi
14:00 JST				Stadium: Earth Care Gunma Shikishima Football Stadium

27 April Saitama Final	**Tokyo International University**	**2–0**	Aventura Kawaguchi	Saitama
11:30 JST				Stadium: Saitama Stadium 2002 2nd Ground

10 May Chiba Final	**Juntendo University**	**1–1** (a.e.t.) (**5–4** p)	Briobecca Urayasu Ichikawa	Chiba
13:00 JST				Stadium: Fukuda Denshi Arena

10 May Tokyo Final	**Hosei University**	**2–1**	Meiji University	Kita
14:00 JST				Stadium: Ajinomoto Field Nishigaoka

11 May Kanagawa Final	**SC Sagamihara**	**3–1**	YSCC Yokohama	Yokohama
13:00 JST				Stadium: Nippatsu Mitsuzawa Stadium

27 April Yamanashi Final	**Yamanashi Gakuin University Pegasus**	**2–0**	Yamanashi Gakuin University	Kofu
10:00 JST				Stadium: JIT Recycle Ink Stadium

10 May Niigata Final	**Niigata University H&W**	**4–2** (a.e.t.)	Japan Soccer College	Shibata
13:00 JST				Stadium: Green Stadium Shibata

11 May Nagano Final	**Matsumoto Yamaga**	**1–0**	Nagano Parceiro	Matsumoto
14:03 JST				Stadium: Sunpro Alwin

11 May Toyama Final	**Toyama Shinjo**	**7–0**	Joganji Toyama	Toyama
11:00 JST				Stadium: Iwase Sports Park

11 May Ishikawa Final	**Zweigen Kanazawa**	**3–0**	Kanazawa Gakuin University	Kanazawa
13:00 JST				Stadium: Kanazawa Go Go Curry Stadium

11 May Fukui Final	**Fukui United**	**6–0**	Sakai Phoenix	Sakai
13:00 JST				Stadium: Technoport Fukui Stadium

11 May Shizuoka Final	**Honda FC**	**2–1**	Gakunan F. Mosuperio	Numazu
14:00 JST				Stadium: Ashitaka Park Stadium

10 May Aichi Final	**Chukyo University**	**0–0** (a.e.t.) (**4–3** p)	Maruyasu Okazaki	Okazaki
13:00 JST				Stadium: Maruyasu Okazaki Ryuhoku Stadium

11 May Mie Final	**Veertien Mie**	**4–0**	FC Ise-Shima	Suzuka
12:05 JST				Stadium: Mie Suzuka Sports Garden

10 May Gifu Final	**FC Gifu**	**3–0**	FC Gifu Second	Gifu
13:00 JST				Stadium: Gifu Nagaragawa Meadow

11 May Shiga Final	**Moriyama Samurai 2000**	**1–0**	Viabenten Shiga	Ōtsu
13:00 JST				Stadium: Ojiyama Stadium

11 May Kyoto Final	**Kyoto Sangyo University**	**3–2** (a.e.t.)	Ococias Kyoto	Kyoto
13:00 JST				Stadium: Takebishi Stadium Kyoto

11 May Osaka Final	**FC Osaka**	**2–1** (a.e.t.)	Tiamo Hirakata	Sakai
13:00 JST				Stadium: J-Green Sakai S1

10 May Hyogo Final	**Basara Hyogo**	**2–2** (a.e.t.) (**4–2** p)	Cento Cuore Harima	Sumoto
14:00 JST				Stadium: ASPA Goshikidai Sub Ground

10 May Nara Final	**Nara Club**	**2–0**	Asuka FC	Nara
13:00 JST				Stadium: Rohto Field Nara

11 May Wakayama Final	**Arterivo Wakayama**	**8–0**	Nanki Orange Sunrise	Wakayama
11:00 JST				Stadium: Kimiidera Athletic Stadium

27 April Tottori Final	**Gainare Tottori**	**4–0**	Yonago Genki SC	Yonago
12:00 JST				Stadium: All Gainare Yajin Stadium

20 April Shimane Final	**Belugarosso Iwami**	**3–0**	Shikou Club	Masuda
13:00 JST				Stadium: Shimane Football Field

19 April Okayama Final	**International Pacific University FC**	**2–1**	Mitsubishi Mizushima FC	Okayama
13:00 JST				Stadium: Okayama Multipurpose Ground Auxiliary Football Field

20 April Hiroshima Final	**Fukuyama City FC**	**4–0**	Hiroshima University	Hiroshima
13:00 JST				Stadium: Edion Peace Wing Hiroshima

20 April Yamaguchi Final	**FC Baleine Shimonoseki**	**3–0**	AC Boa Sorte Yamaguchi Ube	Shimonoseki
10:00 JST				Stadium: Nogihama Park Natural Grass Ground

11 May Kagawa Final	**Kamatamare Sanuki**	**3–0**	Tadotsu FC	Takamatsu
13:00 JST				Stadium: Kagawa Prefectural Soccer & Rugby Stadium

4 May Tokushima Final	**FC Tokushima**	**7–1**	FC NJ	Naruto
14:00 JST				Stadium: Naruto Otsuka Sports Park Ball Game Field

11 May Ehime Final	**Lvnirosso NC**	**4–1**	Ehime University	Matsuyama
13:00 JST				Stadium: Ehime Sports Park Soccer/Rugby Field

11 May Kochi Final	**Kochi United**	**1–0**	KUFC Nankoku	Kochi
13:00 JST				Stadium: Kochi Haruno Athletic Stadium

11 May Fukuoka Final	**Giravanz Kitakyushu**	**2–1**	KMG Holdings	Kitakyushu
13:00 JST				Stadium: Mikuni World Stadium Kitakyushu

4 May Saga Final	**Brew Saga**	**1–0**	Kawasoe Club	Saga
11:00 JST				Stadium: Saga Sunrise Park Saga Stadium

11 May Nagasaki Final	**Mitsubishi Nagasaki SC**	**4–0**	Togitsu SC	Isahaya
13:00 JST				Stadium: Transcosmos Stadium Nagasaki

11 May Kumamoto Final	**Hirondelle Kumamoto**	**2–1**	FCK Marry Gold Kumamoto	Kashima
10:00 JST				Stadium: Kumamoto Football Center Cosmos

11 May Oita Final	**Verspah Oita**	**1–1** (a.e.t.) (**5–4** p)	J-Lease FC	Oita
13:00 JST				Stadium: Crasus Soccer & Rugby Field A Court

11 May Miyazaki Final	**Veroskronos Tsuno**	**2–0**	Tegevajaro Miyazaki	Miyazaki
13:00 JST				Stadium: Ikimenomori Sports Park Athletic Field

11 May Kagoshima Final	**Kagoshima United**	**4–1**	NIFS Kanoya	Kagoshima
13:00 JST				Stadium: Shiranami Stadium

11 May Okinawa Final	**Okinawa SV**	**1–0** (a.e.t.)	FC Ryukyu	Okinawa
13:00 JST				Stadium: Tapic Kenso Hiyagon Stadium

== Participating clubs ==
=== J1 League ===
All teams playing in the 2024 J1 League join the competition in the second round, except 2025 FIFA Club World Cup participants Urawa Red Diamonds, who join in the Round of 16.

Club	Apps.	Prefecture
Kashima Antlers	40th	Ibaraki
Urawa Red Diamonds	59th	Saitama
Kashiwa Reysol	57th	Chiba
FC Tokyo	31st	Tokyo
Tokyo Verdy	50th	Tokyo
Machida Zelvia	13th	Tokyo
Kawasaki Frontale	42nd	Kanagawa
Yokohama F. Marinos	47th	Kanagawa
Yokohama FC	26th	Kanagawa
Shonan Bellmare	53rd	Kanagawa

Club	Apps.	Prefecture
Albirex Niigata	33rd	Niigata
Shimizu S-Pulse	33rd	Shizuoka
Nagoya Grampus	48th	Aichi
Kyoto Sanga	42nd	Kyoto
Gamba Osaka	45th	Osaka
Cerezo Osaka	56th	Osaka
Vissel Kobe	38th	Hyogo
Fagiano Okayama	17th	Okayama
Sanfrecce Hiroshima	73rd	Hiroshima
Avispa Fukuoka	33rd	Fukuoka

=== J2 League ===
Out of 20 participating teams in the 2025 J2 League, 14 join the competition in the second round. Six teams (highlighted with a "†") join the tournament in the first round: the three worst-ranked non-relegated 2024 J2 League teams and those promoted from the 2024 J3 League.

Club	Apps.	Prefecture
Hokkaido Consadole Sapporo	44th	Hokkaido
Vegalta Sendai	31st	Miyagi
Blaublitz Akita	32nd	Akita
Montedio Yamagata	33rd	Yamagata
Iwaki FC	8th	Fukushima
Mito HollyHock †	29th	Ibaraki
RB Omiya Ardija †	30th	Saitama
JEF United Chiba	60th	Chiba
Ventforet Kofu	33rd	Yamanashi
Kataller Toyama †	16th	Toyama

Club	Apps.	Prefecture
Júbilo Iwata	48th	Shizuoka
Fujieda MYFC	7th	Shizuoka
Renofa Yamaguchi	21st	Yamaguchi
Tokushima Vortis	37th	Tokushima
Ehime FC †	24th	Ehime
FC Imabari †	15th	Ehime
Sagan Tosu	33rd	Saga
V-Varen Nagasaki	18th	Nagasaki
Roasso Kumamoto	25th	Kumamoto
Oita Trinita †	29th	Oita

=== Amateur Designated Team ===
Toyo University was selected by the JFA to receive the automatic qualification for the tournament. They are the defending national university champions, having won the 2024 All Japan University Football Championship.

Team	Prefecture	League	Level	Apps.
Toyo University	Tokyo	Kanto University League D1	UL1	1st

=== Prefectural Representatives ===
All the 47 prefectural tournament winners (prefectural representatives) join in the first round.

Prefecture	Team	League	Level	Apps.
Hokkaido	BTOP Hokkaido	Hokkaido Soccer League	5	2nd
Aomori	ReinMeer Aomori	Japan Football League	4	4th
Iwate	Iwate Grulla Morioka	Japan Football League	4	18th
Miyagi	Sendai University	Tohoku University League Div. 1	UL1	4th
Akita	North Asia University	Tohoku University League Div. 1	UL1	3rd
Yamagata	Oyama SC	Tohoku Soccer League Div. 2 South	6	4th
Fukushima	Fukushima United	J3 League	3	13th
Ibaraki	University of Tsukuba	Kanto University League Div. 1	UL1	35th
Tochigi	Tochigi SC	J3 League	3	25th
Gunma	Thespa Gunma	J3 League	3	22nd
Saitama	Tokyo International University	Kanto University League Div. 1	UL1	8th
Chiba	Juntendo University	Kanto University League Div. 2	UL2	17th
Tokyo	Hosei University	Kanto University League Div. 2	UL2	14th
Kanagawa	SC Sagamihara	J3 League	3	4th
Yamanashi	Yamanashi Gakuin Univ. Pegasus	Yamanashi Football League	7	7th
Nagano	Matsumoto Yamaga	J3 League	3	17th
Niigata	Niigata University H&W	Hokushin'etsu University League Div. 1	UL1	8th
Toyama	Toyama Shinjo	Hokushinetsu Football League Div. 1	5	8th
Ishikawa	Zweigen Kanazawa	J3 League	3	21st
Fukui	Fukui United	Hokushinetsu Football League Div. 1	5	17th
Shizuoka	Honda FC	Japan Football League	4	45th
Aichi	Chukyo University	Tokai University League Div. 1	UL1	9th
Mie	Veertien Mie	Japan Football League	4	5th
Gifu	FC Gifu	J3 League	3	19th
Shiga	Moriyama Samurai 2000	Kansai Soccer League Div. 1	5	1st
Kyoto	Kyoto Sangyo University	Kansai University League Div. 1	UL1	7th
Osaka	FC Osaka	J3 League	3	7th
Hyogo	Basara Hyogo	Kansai Soccer League Div. 1	5	1st
Nara	Nara Club	J3 League	3	16th
Wakayama	Arterivo Wakayama	Kansai Soccer League Div. 1	5	17th
Tottori	Gainare Tottori	J3 League	3	27th
Shimane	Belugarosso Iwami	Chugoku Soccer League	5	4th
Okayama	International Pacific University FC	Chugoku Soccer League	5	1st
Hiroshima	Fukuyama City	Chugoku Soccer League	5	5th
Yamaguchi	Baleine Shimonoseki	Chugoku Soccer League	5	5th
Kagawa	Kamatamare Sanuki	J3 League	3	25th
Tokushima	FC Tokushima	Shikoku Soccer League	5	10th
Ehime	Lvnirosso NC	Shikoku Soccer League	5	1st
Kochi	Kochi United	Japan Football League	4	10th
Fukuoka	Giravanz Kitakyushu	J3 League	3	16th
Saga	Brew Saga	Kyushu Soccer League	5	12th
Nagasaki	Mitsubishi Nagasaki SC	Kyushu Soccer League	5	12th
Kumamoto	Hirondelle Kumamoto	Kumamoto Football League	7	1st
Oita	Verspah Oita	Japan Football League	4	14th
Miyazaki	Veroskronos Tsuno	Kyushu Soccer League	5	2nd
Kagoshima	Kagoshima United	J3 League	3	11th
Okinawa	Okinawa SV	Japan Football League	4	6th

== Schedule ==
On 7 March 2025, the JFA announced the match pairings for the tournament, with its respective dates and kick-offs being revealed up to the Round of 16. Match pairings for the quarter-finals onwards were not announced at the time.

=== First round ===
Number of teams per tier in this round
J2 League (2)	J3 League (3)	Japan Football League (4)	Regional 1st Divs. (5)	Regional 2nd Divs. (6)	Prefectural leagues (7)	University Leagues (UL)	Total
6 / 6	14 / 14	6 / 6	15 / 15	1 / 1	2 / 2	10 / 10	54 / 88

24 May Match 1	Kamatamare Sanuki (3)	2–2 (a.e.t.) (4–5 p)	(3) Kochi United	Marugame
14:00 JST	Iwamoto 59'; Maekawa 116'	Report	Shintani 50'; Kozuki 108'	Stadium: Pikara Stadium; Attendance: 658; Referee: Takamasa Funahashi
	Penalties
	Maekawa (penalty scored); Iwagishi (penalty scored); Yoshida (penalty scored); Uchida (penalty missed); Ibayashi (penalty scored)		(penalty scored) Uchida; (penalty scored) Kobayashi; (penalty scored) Kanehara; (penalty scored) Fukagawa; (penalty scored) Sasaki

25 May Match 2	Fukui United (5)	1–0	(4) Honda FC	Sakai
13:00 JST	? 65' (o.g.)	Report		Stadium: Technoport Fukui Stadium; Attendance: 548; Referee: Shingo Kuniyoshi

25 May Match 3	Fukuyama City (5)	2–1	(5) FC Tokushima	Hiroshima
13:00 JST	Matsui 63'; Fujii 83'	Report	Fujiwara 60'	Stadium: Edion Peace Wing Hiroshima; Attendance: 869; Referee: Yusuke Kanabuchi

24 May Match 4	Sendai University (UL)	2–4	(UL) Toyo University	Rifu
13:00 JST	Komatsu 22'; ? 30' (o.g.)	Report	Takahashi 14', 40'; Okabe 15'; Miyamoto 45'	Stadium: Miyagi Co-op Megumino Soccer Field; Attendance: 205; Referee: Kiyoto Takeuchi

25 May Match 5	Fukushima United (3)	9–1	(UL) Tokyo Int. University	Fukushima
13:00 JST	Mori 12', 55'; Fujitani 25'; Higuchi 31', 46'; Nakamura 35'; Jojo 45'; Ishii 66', 83'	Report	Furuya 15'	Stadium: Toho Stadium; Attendance: 633; Referee: Masaaki Hiratsuka

24 May Match 6	Mito HollyHock (2)	0–1	(3) SC Sagamihara	Mito
13:00 JST		Report	Muto 86'	Stadium: K's denki Stadium Mito; Attendance: 1,713; Referee: Takahito Seta

25 May Match 7	ReinMeer Aomori (4)	5–0	(5) BTOP Hokkaido	Hachinohe
13:00 JST	Arita 14', 64'; Nagashima 57'; Nishisaka 85'; Saito 90+3'	Report		Stadium: Prifoods Stadium; Attendance: 292; Referee: Masakazu Kato

25 May Match 8	Veertien Mie (4)	1–0	(7) YGU Pegasus	Suzuka
13:00 JST	Ito 72'	Report		Stadium: Mie Suzuka Sports Garden; Attendance: 453; Referee: Satoshi Itaya

25 May Match 9	FC Imabari (2)	0–2	(3) Kagoshima United	Imabari
13:00 JST		Report	Nduka 79'; Kawamura 86'	Stadium: ASICS Satoyama Stadium; Attendance: 1,597; Referee: Shinya Sasaki

25 May Match 10	Thespa Gunma (3)	1–0	(UL) Hosei University	Maebashi
13:00 JST	Takazawa 90+6'	Report		Stadium: Earth Care Gunma Shikishima Football Stadium; Attendance: 1,264; Referee: Masaki Yamada

25 May Match 11	RB Omiya Ardija (2)	0–1	(UL) University of Tsukuba	Saitama
14:00 JST		Report	Hiroi 40'	Stadium: NACK5 Stadium Omiya; Attendance: 4,826; Referee: Hirokazu Otsubo

25 May Match 12	Okinawa SV (4)	4–1	(4) Verspah Oita	Okinawa
13:00 JST	Shimoguchi 18'; Takashio 26'; Ueno 53'; Kawanaka 67'	Report	Takayama 52'	Stadium: Tapic Kenso Hiyagon Stadium; Attendance: 290; Referee: Yuki Murata

25 May Match 13	Belugarosso Iwami (5)	0–1	(3) Giravanz Kitakyushu	Izumo
13:00 JST		Report	Yoshinaga 19'	Stadium: Hamayama Park Football Field; Attendance: 679; Referee: Kota Sato

24 May Match 14	Brew Saga (5)	2–1	(7) Hirondelle Kumamoto	Saga
13:00 JST	? 22' (o.g.); Hirakata 66'	Report	Morita 25'	Stadium: Saga Stadium; Attendance: 235; Referee: Tatsuya Sakai

25 May Match 15	Baleine Shimonoseki (5)	2–1 (a.e.t.)	(5) Int. Pacific University FC	Shimonoseki
13:00 JST	Toda 64'; Kamimura 97'	Report	Ono 25'	Stadium: Saving Athletic Stadium; Attendance: 712; Referee: Takao Nishiyama

24 May Match 16	FC Gifu (3)	3–1	(5) Toyama Shinjo	Gifu
13:00 JST	Aihara 31'; Kai 53'; Nozawa 85'	Report	Matsuoka 88'	Stadium: Shin-Nippon Gas Meadow; Attendance: 835; Referee: Yuta Oho

25 May Match 17	Matsumoto Yamaga (3)	2–1 (a.e.t.)	(3) FC Osaka	Matsumoto
13:00 JST	Murakoshi 25'; Kikui 97'	Report	Kawakami 71'	Stadium: Sunpro Alwin; Attendance: 3,560; Referee: Tomoki Nakayama

25 May Match 18	Zweigen Kanazawa (3)	6–0	(UL) Chukyo University	Kanazawa
13:00 JST	Shinomiya 15'; Toshida 56', 71'; Miyazaki 57'; Otani 63'; Patric 86'	Report		Stadium: Kanazawa Go Go Curry Stadium; Attendance: 1,385; Referee: Yuki Nishida

25 May Match 19	Oita Trinita (2)	2–0	(5) Lvnirosso NC	Oita
13:00 JST	Arima 17'; Isa 36'	Report		Stadium: Crasus Dome Oita; Attendance: 3,168; Referee: Hiromichi Oka

25 May Match 20	Arterivo Wakayama (5)	4–3	(5) Basara Hyogo	Wakayama
13:00 JST	Osako 15'; Shimotsuka 33'; Sugiura 67', 80'	Report	Igarashi 28'; Yeom Tae-hwan 53'; Mori 90+1'	Stadium: Kimiidera Athletic Stadium; Attendance: 501; Referee: Fumiya Honda

24 May Match 21	Kyoto Sangyo University (UL)	3–1	(5) Moriyama Samurai 2000	Kyoto
13:00 JST	Nishikawa 61'; Ogura 70'; Ito 90'	Report	Oshima 58'	Stadium: Takebishi Stadium Kyoto; Attendance: 549; Referee: Shungo Kikuchi

25 May Match 22	Kataller Toyama (2)	2–1	(UL) Juntendo University	Takaoka
13:00 JST	Usui 67'; Furukawa 70'	Report	Oi 16'	Stadium: Takaoka Sports Core Football & Rugby Field; Attendance: 1,754; Referee: Kentaro Uematsu

24 May Match 23	Nara Club (3)	3–1 (a.e.t.)	(UL) Niigata University H&W	Nara
13:00 JST	Nakashima 25'; Kawatani 105+2'; Tamura 120+1'	Report	Takehara 75'	Stadium: Rohto Field Nara; Attendance: 360; Referee: Mutsuki Takahashi

25 May Match 24	Iwate Grulla Morioka (4)	6–0	(UL) North Asia University	Morioka
13:00 JST	Wada 9'; Won Tae-rang 36'; Matsumura 44'; Fujishima 55'; Yomesaka 71'; Sillas 75'	Report		Stadium: Iwagin Stadium; Attendance: 355; Referee: Ryu Mashio

24 May Match 25	Tochigi SC (3)	5–0	(6) Oyama SC	Utsunomiya
13:00 JST	Hoshino 26', 43', 60'; Igarashi 59'; Mori 90'	Report		Stadium: Tochigi Green Stadium; Attendance: 1,217; Referee: Kenshi Uda

24 May Match 26	Ehime FC (2)	1–0	(5) Mitsubishi Nagasaki	Matsuyama
13:00 JST	Kubota 55'	Report		Stadium: Ningineer Stadium; Attendance: 662; Referee: Ryo Munakata

24 May Match 27	Veroskronos Tsuno (5)	2–1	(3) Gainare Tottori	Shintomi
13:00 JST	Matsumoto 20'; Kammera 67'	Report	Fukoin 76'	Stadium: Ichigo Miyazaki Shintomi Football Stadium; Attendance: 344; Referee: Takuya Kobayashi

=== Second round ===
Number of teams per tier in this round
J1 League (1)	J2 League (2)	J3 League (3)	Japan Football League (4)	Regional 1st Divs. (5)	University Leagues (UL)	Total
19 / 20	17 / 20	11 / 14	4 / 7	6 / 15	3 / 10	60 / 88

11 June Match 28	Vissel Kobe (1)	4–1	(3) Kochi United	Kobe
19:00 JST	? 10' (o.g.); Erik 50'; ? 64' (o.g.); Hirose 84'	Report	Miyoshi 75'	Stadium: Noevir Stadium Kobe; Attendance: 4,597; Referee: Akihiko Ikeuchi

11 June Match 29	Ventforet Kofu (2)	2–1	(5) Fukui United	Kofu
19:00 JST	Inoue 15'; Mitsuhira 62'	Report	Takagai 65'	Stadium: JIT Recycle Ink Stadium; Attendance: 2,757; Referee: Tomohiro Inoue

11 June Match 30	Albirex Niigata (1)	1–0 (a.e.t.)	(5) Fukuyama City	Niigata
19:00 JST	Kasai 108'	Report		Stadium: Denka Big Swan Stadium; Attendance: 5,653; Referee: Naoto Uehara

11 June Match 31	Kashiwa Reysol (1)	0–2 (a.e.t.)	(UL) Toyo University	Kashiwa
19:00 JST		Report	Yamanouchi 107'; Yoda 120+1'	Stadium: Sankyo Frontier Kashiwa Stadium; Attendance: 3,052; Referee: Koji Takasaki

11 June Match 32	Kawasaki Frontale (1)	4–3	(3) Fukushima United	Kawasaki
19:00 JST	Yamada 29', 51'; Wakizaka 64'; Kobayashi 84'	Report	Mori 9'; Yajima 89'; Kano 90+1'	Stadium: Uvance Todoroki Stadium by Fujitsu; Attendance: 7,942; Referee: Yoshimi Yamashita

11 June Match 33	Júbilo Iwata (2)	1–2	(3) SC Sagamihara	Iwata
19:00 JST	Kawasaki 23'	Report	Takagi 61'; Rafael Furtado 90+4'	Stadium: Yamaha Stadium; Attendance: 3,569; Referee: Tetsuro Yoshida

11 June Match 34	Yokohama F. Marinos (1)	0–2	(4) ReinMeer Aomori	Yokohama
18:30 JST		Report	Hirosue 36' (pen.); Luiz Fernando 45+1'	Stadium: Nippatsu Mitsuzawa Stadium; Attendance: 4,964; Referee: Shu Kawamata

11 June Match 35	Iwaki FC (2)	1–2	(2) Blaublitz Akita	Iwaki
19:00 JST	Tanimura 85'	Report	Sagawa 51', 54'	Stadium: Hawaiians Stadium Iwaki; Attendance: 1,797; Referee: Hayato Shimizu

18 June Match 36	Gamba Osaka (1)	2–1	(4) Veertien Mie	Suita
19:00 JST	Sasaki 58'; Hümmet 67'	Report	Otake 56'	Stadium: Panasonic Stadium Suita; Attendance: 6,165; Referee: Yusuke Araki

11 June Match 37	Montedio Yamagata (2)	2–1	(3) Kagoshima United	Tendo
19:00 JST	Sakamoto 4'; Fujimoto 80'	Report	Yonezawa 63'	Stadium: ND Soft Stadium Yamagata; Attendance: 2,578; Referee: Keisuke Nobori

11 June Match 38	Kashima Antlers (1)	4–0	(3) Thespa Gunma	Kashima
19:00 JST	Sehata 36' (o.g.); Suzuki 50', 55', 86'	Report		Stadium: Kashima Soccer Stadium; Attendance: 6,108; Referee: Hiroyuki Kimura

11 June Match 39	V-Varen Nagasaki (2)	2–1	(UL) University of Tsukuba	Nagasaki
19:00 JST	Kasayanagi 5'; Nagura 24'	Report	Kobayashi 90+2'	Stadium: Peace Stadium Connected by SoftBank; Attendance: 5,204; Referee: Shuhei Ishimaru

11 June Match 40	Avispa Fukuoka (1)	2–0	(4) Okinawa SV	Fukuoka
19:00 JST	Maeda 65'; ? 89' (o.g.)	Report		Stadium: Best Denki Stadium; Attendance: 2,078; Referee: Keigo Sendachi

11 June Match 41	Fagiano Okayama (1)	0–2	(3) Giravanz Kitakyushu	Okayama
19:00 JST		Report	Kawabe 12'; Yoshihara 52'	Stadium: JFE Harenokuni Stadium; Attendance: 3,944; Referee: Daichi Shiino

11 June Match 42	Sanfrecce Hiroshima (1)	3–1	(5) Brew Saga	Fukuyama
18:30 JST	Marcos Júnior 3', 33'; Maeda 81'	Report	Kasuya 41'	Stadium: Fukuyama Tsuun Rose Stadium; Attendance: 3,942; Referee: Futoshi Nakamura

11 June Match 43	Fujieda MYFC (2)	2–0	(5) Baleine Shimonoseki	Fujieda
19:00 JST	Diamanka 63', 70'	Report		Stadium: Fujieda Soccer Stadium; Attendance: 810; Referee: Yosuke Kubota

11 June Match 44	Shonan Bellmare (1)	2–0	(3) FC Gifu	Hiratsuka
19:00 JST	A. Suzuki 63'; Kim Min-tae 67'	Report		Stadium: Lemon Gas Stadium Hiratsuka; Attendance: 2,188; Referee: Yoshiro Imamura

11 June Match 45	Shimizu S-Pulse (1)	4–2	(3) Matsumoto Yamaga	Shizuoka
19:00 JST	Nakahara 5'; Sumiyoshi 10'; Yajima 48'; Yumiba 77'	Report	Ninomiya 45+1', 65'	Stadium: IAI Stadium Nihondaira; Attendance: 4,582; Referee: Koki Nagamine

18 June Match 46	FC Tokyo (1)	3–1	(3) Zweigen Kanazawa	Chofu
19:00 JST	Sato 32', 44'; Nagakura 85'	Report	Murata 90'	Stadium: Ajinomoto Stadium; Attendance: 5,651; Referee: Hayato Shimizu

18 June Match 47	Consadole Sapporo (2)	2–2 (a.e.t.) (3–5 p)	(2) Oita Trinita	Sapporo
19:00 JST	Kido 24'; Izuma 28'	Report	Satsukawa 39'; Utsumoto 90+5'	Stadium: Daiwa House Premist Dome; Attendance: 4,316; Referee: Koei Koya
	Penalties
	Shirai (penalty scored); Takamine (penalty missed); Kodama (penalty scored); Tanaka (penalty scored)		(penalty scored) Isa; (penalty scored) Amagasa; (penalty scored) Ikeda; (penalty scored) Utsumoto; (penalty scored) Fujiwara

11 June Match 48	Cerezo Osaka (1)	5–0	(5) Arterivo Wakayama	Osaka
19:00 JST	Vitor Bueno 31'; Thiago Andrade 50'; Rafael Ratão 64'; Noborizato 87'; Furuyama 90+1'	Report		Stadium: Yodoko Sakura Stadium; Attendance: 4,195; Referee: Yuzo Sutani

11 June Match 49	Tokushima Vortis (2)	2–1	(2) Renofa Yamaguchi	Naruto
18:30 JST	Rio Hyeon 18'; Tsuboi 90+2'	Report	Suenaga 58'	Stadium: Pocarisweat Stadium; Attendance: 1,498; Referee: Hiromichi Oka

11 June Match 50	Machida Zelvia (1)	2–1	(UL) Kyoto Sangyo University	Machida
19:00 JST	Sōma 86'; Fujio 90+2'	Report	Hasegawa 58'	Stadium: Machida GION Stadium; Attendance: 1,704; Referee: Takafumi Mikuriya

11 June Match 51	Vegalta Sendai (2)	0–1	(2) Kataller Toyama	Sendai
19:00 JST		Report	Takahashi 45+2'	Stadium: Q&A Stadium Miyagi; Attendance: 1,719; Referee: Reo Tanaka

11 June Match 52	Kyoto Sanga (1)	1–0	(3) Nara Club	Kyoto
19:00 JST	Fukuda 87'	Report		Stadium: Sanga Stadium by Kyocera; Attendance: 3,774; Referee: Yudai Yamamoto

18 June Match 53	Yokohama FC (1)	2–1	(4) Iwate Grulla Morioka	Yokohama
18:30 JST	Muroi 63'; Ogura 90+4'	Report	Muta 70'	Stadium: Nippatsu Mitsuzawa Stadium; Attendance: 1,557; Referee: Koichiro Fukushima

11 June Match 54	Tokyo Verdy (1)	3–1	(3) Tochigi SC	Tokyo
19:00 JST	Tsunashima 4'; Suzuki 44'; Yamami 50'	Report	Takahashi 32'	Stadium: Ajinomoto Stadium; Attendance: 2,726; Referee: Takuto Okabe

11 June Match 55	Sagan Tosu (2)	1–0	(2) Ehime FC	Tosu
19:00 JST	Suzuki 69'	Report		Stadium: Ekimae Real Estate Stadium; Attendance: 2,573; Referee: Yoshito Nakagawa

11 June Match 56	Nagoya Grampus (1)	3–0	(5) Veroskronos Tsuno	Toyota
18:30 JST	Inagaki 47'; Hara 67'; Yamagishi 79'	Report		Stadium: Toyota Stadium; Attendance: 4,248; Referee: Masuya Ueda

11 June Match 57	JEF United Chiba (2)	1–1 (a.e.t.) (4–5 p)	(2) Roasso Kumamoto	Chiba
19:00 JST	Goya 28'	Report	? 85' (o.g.)	Stadium: Fukuda Denshi Arena; Attendance: 3,953; Referee: Genki Tawara
	Penalties
	Issei Takahashi (penalty scored); Dudu (penalty missed); Kawano (penalty scored); Toriumi (penalty scored); Carlinhos Júnior (penalty scored); Yokoyama (penalty missed)		(penalty scored) Iwashita; (penalty missed) Handai; (penalty scored) Fujii; (penalty scored) Shiohama; (penalty scored) Konagaya; (penalty scored) Toyoda

=== Third round ===
Number of teams per tier in this round
J1 League (1)	J2 League (2)	J3 League (3)	Japan Football League (4)	University Leagues (UL)	Total
16 / 20	10 / 20	2 / 14	1 / 7	1 / 10	30 / 88

16 July Match 58	Vissel Kobe (1)	2–1 (a.e.t.)	(2) Ventforet Kofu	Kofu
19:00 JST	Iwanami 90+7'; Erik 94'	Report	Naito 58'	Stadium: JIT Recycle Ink Stadium; Attendance: 4,608; Referee: Masuya Ueda

16 July Match 59	Albirex Niigata (1)	1–2	(UL) Toyo University	Niigata
19:00 JST	Hashimoto 49'	Report	Murakami 45+2'; Yunomae 57'	Stadium: Denka Big Swan Stadium; Attendance: 5,887; Referee: Takuto Okabe

16 July Match 60	Kawasaki Frontale (1)	0–0 (a.e.t.) (1–3 p)	(3) SC Sagamihara	Kanagawa
19:00 JST		Report		Stadium: Uvance Todoroki Stadium by Fujitsu; Attendance: 8,661; Referee: Jumpei Iida
	Penalties
	Kawahara (penalty missed); Yamamoto (penalty missed); Kanda (penalty missed); Ozeki (penalty scored)		(penalty scored) Muto; (penalty missed) Pytlik; (penalty scored) Takeuchi; (penalty missed) Kato; (penalty scored) Takano

16 July Match 61	ReinMeer Aomori (4)	1–2	(2) Blaublitz Akita	Hachinohe
18:30 JST	Hirosue 29'	Report	Sagawa 8', 39'	Stadium: Prifoods Stadium; Attendance: 736; Referee: Yoshimi Yamashita

16 July Match 62	Gamba Osaka (1)	4–4 (a.e.t.) (3–4 p)	(2) Montedio Yamagata	Tendo
19:00 JST	Jebali 40', 73'; Kurokawa 60'; Nakatani 120+2'	Report	Kida 20', 30'; Takahashi 78'; Yoshio 116'	Stadium: ND Soft Stadium Yamagata; Attendance: 5,471; Referee: Yusuke Araki
	Penalties
	Usami (penalty missed); Welton (penalty scored); Jebali (penalty scored); Kishimoto (penalty scored); Mitsuta (penalty missed)		(penalty scored) Takahashi; (penalty scored) Sakamoto; (penalty scored) Yoshio; (penalty scored) Abe

16 July Match 63	Kashima Antlers (1)	2–1	(2) V-Varen Nagasaki	Nagasaki
19:00 JST	Čavrić 9'; Ogawa 53'	Report	Yamasaki 58'	Stadium: Peace Stadium Connected by SoftBank; Attendance: 11,388; Referee: Koei Koya

16 July Match 64	Avispa Fukuoka (1)	0–0 (a.e.t.) (4–2 p)	(3) Giravanz Kitakyushu	Fukuoka
19:00 JST		Report		Stadium: Best Denki Stadium; Attendance: 8,712; Referee: Hiroki Kasahara
	Penalties
	Kanamori (penalty missed); Ben Khalifa (penalty scored); Matsuoka (penalty scored); Hashimoto (penalty scored); Zahedi (penalty scored)		(penalty missed) Watanabe; (penalty scored) Tsubogo; (penalty scored) Tsujioka; (penalty missed) Kiyama

16 July Match 65	Sanfrecce Hiroshima (1)	5–2	(2) Fujieda MYFC	Fujieda
19:00 JST	Kato 19'; Maeda 38'; Nakamura 54'; Nakano 67'; Kinoshita 72'	Report	Asakura 15'; V. Germain 44' (o.g.)	Stadium: Fujieda Soccer Stadium; Attendance: 1,822; Referee: Koichiro Fukushima

16 July Match 66	Shonan Bellmare (1)	0–1	(1) Shimizu S-Pulse	Hiratsuka
19:00 JST		Report	Douglas Tanque 105+1'	Stadium: Lemon Gas Stadium Hiratsuka; Attendance: 3,631; Referee: Naoto Uehara

16 July Match 67	FC Tokyo (1)	2–0	(2) Oita Trinita	Oita
19:00 JST	Nagakura 19'; Koizumi 33'	Report		Stadium: Crasus Dome Oita; Attendance: 4,479; Referee: Yoshiro Imamura

16 July Match 68	Cerezo Osaka (1)	2–0	(2) Tokushima Vortis	Naruto
18:30 JST	Fernandes 60'; Ratão 87'	Report		Stadium: Pocarisweat Stadium; Attendance: 3,475; Referee: Daichi Shiino

16 July Match 69	Machida Zelvia (1)	2–1	(2) Kataller Toyama	Toyama
19:00 JST	Nishimura 21'; Okamura 73'	Report	Take 45+1'	Stadium: Toyama Stadium; Attendance: 3,629; Referee: Koki Nagamine

16 July Match 70	Kyoto Sanga (1)	3–3 (a.e.t.) (4–3 p)	(1) Yokohama FC	Kyoto
19:00 JST	Elias 79'; Nakano 108'; Ota 119'	Report	Suzuki 59'; Ito 91'; Sakuragawa 100'	Stadium: Sanga Stadium by Kyocera; Attendance: 3,906; Referee: Yuzo Sutani
	Penalties
	Rafael Elias (penalty scored); Fukuda (penalty scored); Yamada (penalty scored); Marco Túlio (penalty missed); Sugai (penalty scored)		(penalty scored) Yamada; (penalty missed) Ito; (penalty missed) João Paulo; (penalty scored) Fukumori; (penalty scored) Shimbo

16 July Match 71	Tokyo Verdy (1)	1–0	(2) Sagan Tosu	Tosu
19:00 JST	Someno 69'	Report		Stadium: Ekimae Real Estate Stadium; Attendance: 3,688; Referee: Ryo Tanimoto

16 July Match 72	Nagoya Grampus (1)	2–1	(2) Roasso Kumamoto	Kumamoto
19:00 JST	Junker 39'; Asano 86'	Report	Osaki 74'	Stadium: Egao Kenko Stadium; Attendance: 4,322; Referee: Keigo Sendachi

=== Fourth round ===
Number of teams per tier in this round
J1 League (1)	J2 League (2)	J3 League (3)	University Leagues (UL)	Total
12 / 20	2 / 20	1 / 14	1 / 10	16 / 88

6 August Match 73	Vissel Kobe (1)	2–1 (a.e.t.)	(UL) Toyo University	Kobe
19:00 JST	Ide 13'; Miyashiro 120+1'	Report	Yunomae 36'	Stadium: Noevir Stadium Kobe; Attendance: 5,115; Referee: Koei Koya

6 August Match 74	SC Sagamihara (3)	2–1 (a.e.t.)	(2) Blaublitz Akita	Hiratsuka
19:00 JST	Takagi 34'; Kato 120'	Report	Sato 85'	Stadium: Lemon Gas Stadium Hiratsuka; Attendance: 1,584; Referee: Hayato Shimizu

6 August Match 75	Montedio Yamagata (2)	1–2	(1) Urawa Red Diamonds	Tendo
19:03 JST	Kokubu 10'	Report	Kaneko 61'; Komori 85'	Stadium: ND Soft Stadium Yamagata; Attendance: 8,699; Referee: Daichi Shiino

6 August Match 76	Kashima Antlers (1)	3–2 (a.e.t.)	(1) Avispa Fukuoka	Kashima
19:00 JST	Čavrić 13' (pen.); Chinen 52'; Suzuki 116'	Report	Maejima 45+2'; Zahedi 90+3'	Stadium: Mercari Stadium; Attendance: 8,241; Referee: Koji Takasaki

6 August Match 77	Sanfrecce Hiroshima (1)	3–0	(1) Shimizu S-Pulse	Hiroshima
18:30 JST	Maeda 45+1'; Nakamura 59'; Kinoshita 75'	Report		Stadium: Edion Peace Wing Hiroshima; Attendance: 10,110; Referee: Takuto Okabe

6 August Match 78	FC Tokyo (1)	2–1	(1) Cerezo Osaka	Osaka
18:33 JST	Nakagawa 55'; Nagakura 79'	Report	Kagawa 60'	Stadium: Yodoko Sakura Stadium; Attendance: 6,136; Referee: Koichiro Fukushima

6 August Match 79	Machida Zelvia (1)	1–0	(1) Kyoto Sanga	Machida
18:30 JST	Fujio 59'	Report		Stadium: Machida GION Stadium; Attendance: 3,003; Referee: Masuya Ueda

13 August Match 80	Tokyo Verdy (1)	1–2	(1) Nagoya Grampus	Tokyo
19:00 JST	Arai 12'	Report	Uchida 26'; Inagaki 81'	Stadium: Ajinomoto Stadium; Attendance: 7,666; Referee: Yusuke Araki

=== Quarter-finals ===
The match-ups from this stage onwards was determined on 14 August 2025.

Number of teams per tier in this round
J1 League (1)	J3 League (3)	Other leagues (2/4+)	Total
7 / 20	1 / 20	0 / 48	8 / 88

27 August Match 81	Machida Zelvia (1)	3–0	(1) Kashima Antlers	Machida
18:30 JST	Masuyama 15'; Fujio 21'; Shimoda 46'	Report		Stadium: Machida GION Stadium; Attendance: 5,965; Referee: Yusuke Araki

27 August Match 82	FC Tokyo (1)	2–1	(1) Urawa Red Diamonds	Saitama
19:00 JST	Marcelo Ryan 52', 65'	Report	Kaneko 42'	Stadium: Saitama Stadium 2002; Attendance: 17,495; Referee: Akihiko Ikeuchi

27 August Match 83	SC Sagamihara (3)	1–1 (a.e.t.) (2–4 p)	(1) Vissel Kobe	Hiratsuka
19:00 JST	Kato 15'	Report	Komatsu 30'	Stadium: Lemon Gas Stadium Hiratsuka; Attendance: 2,730; Referee: Takafumi Mikuriya
	Penalties
	Takano (penalty missed); Nishiyama (penalty scored); Takeuchi (penalty scored); Fukui (penalty missed)		(penalty scored) Erik; (penalty scored) Miyashiro; (penalty scored) Ogihara; (penalty scored) Jean Patric

27 August Match 84	Nagoya Grampus (1)	2–4	(1) Sanfrecce Hiroshima	Toyota
18:30 JST	Nagai 54'; Yamagishi 82'	Report	Tanaka 5', 19'; Nakajima 42'; Nakano 48'	Stadium: Toyota Stadium; Attendance: 7,638; Referee: Hiroki Kasahara

=== Semi-finals ===
16 November Match 85	Machida Zelvia (1)	2–0 (a.e.t.)	(1) FC Tokyo	Shinjuku
13:10 JST	Hayashi 103'; Oh Se-hun 109'	Report		Stadium: Japan National Stadium; Attendance: 25,961; Referee: Akihiko Ikeuchi

16 November Match 86	Vissel Kobe (1)	2–0	(1) Sanfrecce Hiroshima	Suita
15:05 JST	Nagato 24'; Sasaki 69' (pen.)	Report		Stadium: Panasonic Stadium Suita; Attendance: 17,861; Referee: Koei Koya

=== Final ===
Number of teams per tier in this round
J1 League (1)	Total
2 / 20	2 / 88

22 November Match 87	Machida Zelvia (1)	3–1	(1) Vissel Kobe	Shinjuku
14:00	Fujio 6', 56'; Sōma 32'	Report	Miyashiro 62'	Stadium: Japan National Stadium; Attendance: 31,414; Referee: Hiroyuki Kimura

== Top scorers ==
Rank	Player	Team	Goals
1	(Japan) Shota Fujio	Machida Zelvia	5
2	(Japan) Kosuke Sagawa	Blaublitz Akita	4
3	(Japan) Soki Hoshino	Tochigi SC	3
3	(Japan) Naoki Maeda	Sanfrecce Hiroshima	3
3	(Japan) Kota Mori	Fukushima United	3
3	(Japan) Motoki Nagakura	FC Tokyo	3
3	(Japan) Yuma Suzuki	Kashima Antlers	3

== See also ==
- 2025 J1 League
- 2025 J2 League
- 2025 J3 League
- 2025 Japan Football League
- 2025 Japanese Super Cup
