= Hirosue =

Hirosue (written: 広末 or 廣末) is a Japanese surname. Notable people with the surname include:

- Riku Hirosue (廣末 陸, born 1998), Japanese footballer
- Ryōko Hirosue (広末 涼子, born 1980), Japanese actress and singer

== See also ==
- Hirose
