= Takashi Hirose =

Takashi Hirose may refer to the following:

- Taka Hirose (born 1967), Japanese musician and chef who is the bass guitarist for the rock band Feeder
- Takashi Hirose (swimmer) (died 2002), American swimmer
- Takashi Hirose (writer) (born 1943), Japanese writer
