= Kansai University =

University in Suita, Osaka, Japan

- 関西大学
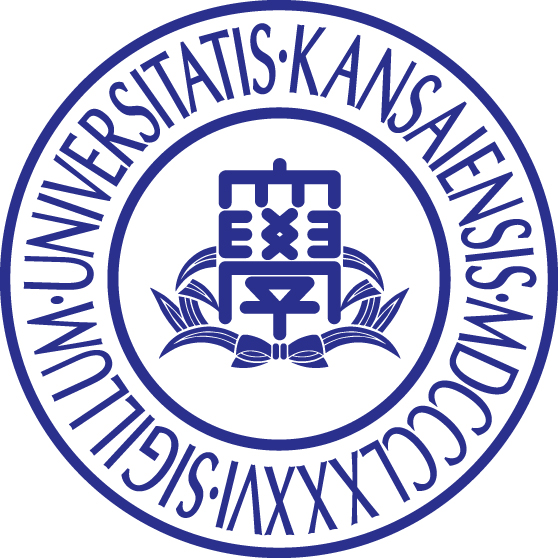
- Former name: Kansai Houritsu Gakko
- Motto: "Gaku no Jitsuge" (学の実化)
- Motto in English: "Harmony between Academia and Society"
- Type: Private
- Established: 1886,; 140 years ago Founded Nov. 4, 1886, Chartered Jun. 5, 1922
- Affiliations: Kansai Big 6
- Endowment: US$1.3 billion (JP¥144.8 billion)
- President: Keiji Shibai
- Faculty: 534 full-time
- Undergraduates: 28,568
- Postgraduates: 1,546
- Doctoral students: 1,779
- Other students: 1,032 (International)
- Location: Suita, Takatsuki, Sakai, Umeda, Osaka, Japan; 34°46′13″N 135°30′29″E
- Campus: Suburban / Urban, 191 acres (0.8 km^{2})
- Athletics: 45 varsity teams
- Colors: Kandai Blue
- Nickname: Kaisers
- Mascots: Ambassador Magma (unofficial and historical)
- Website: https://www.kansai-u.ac.jp/English
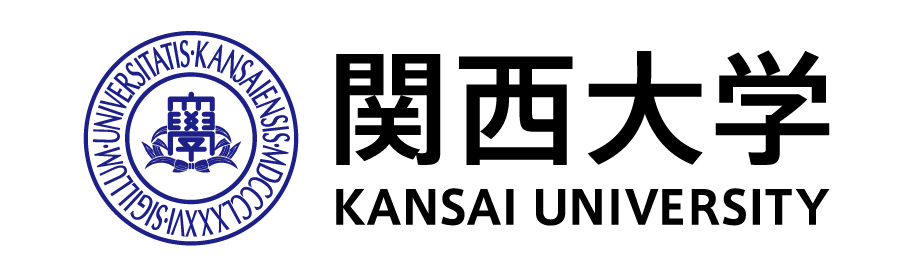

Kansai University (関西大学, Kansai Daigaku), abbreviated as Kandai (関大) or Kansaidai (関西大), is a private non-sectarian and coeducational university with its main campus in Suita, Osaka Prefecture, Japan and two sub-campuses in Sakai and Takatsuki, Osaka Prefecture. Founded as Kansai Law School in 1886, It has been recognized as one of the four leading private universities in western Japan: Kan-Kan-Do-Ritsu (関関同立), along with Kwansei Gakuin University, Doshisha University, and Ritsumeikan University.

The athletic teams at Kansai University are known as the Kaisers and are primarily members of the Kansai Big 6. The Kansai–Kwansei Gakuin rivalry is a college rivalry between two universities located in Kansai, Japan.

== History ==
=== Early history of Kansai University ===
==== Origins ====
The academic traditions of the university reach back to the Hakuensyoin (泊園書院), a Tokugawa shogunate (徳川幕府; 1603–1867) school for local citizens founded by Tōgai Fujisawa (藤沢東畡) in 1825. Kansai University was founded as Kansai Law School (關西法律學校, Kansai hōritsu gakkō) in November 1886, in Osaka City, Japan. Its founders were six judicial officers who were in the service of the then Osaka Court of Appeal.

=== 19th century ===
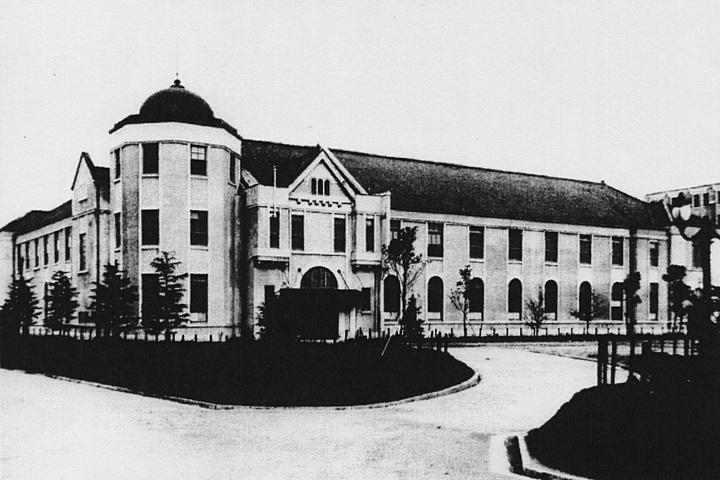
Finished in 1927, the first picture of Main Building

In the early 1870s, the Ministry of Justice established its own law school. Western legal concepts, including that of human rights, were introduced into Japan by distinguished foreign scholars engaged by the Ministry. The founders of Kansai Law School had all studied at this law school, under the French jurist Boissonade de Fontarabie. The idea of individual rights and legal processes independent of central governmental control were new to Japan. Long after the conclusion of their study with Dr. Boissonade, the founders continued to feel that these concepts were vital to the new Japan. They saw it as their duty to popularize jurisprudence to spread throughout the nation two notions: that of an independent judiciary and that of human rights.

From this sense of mission sprung the idea of founding a law school. They then sought and received the assistance and cooperation of Kojima Korekata, their superior (and later Chief Justice of Japan's Supreme Court), and Doi Michio, president of the Osaka Chamber of Commerce and Industry.

Thus Kansai Law School was the first law school in Osaka. The founders taught that the law belongs to all citizens and, that by means of the law, they can and should defend their own rights. This became the origin of the university's academic tradition of nurturing a love of justice and a concern for the protection of the freedom of the individual. Thanks to the support and trust it has won from the general public, the institution has since then steadily developed and diversified.

=== 20th century ===
In 1905 the institution was renamed as Private Kansai University (私立 関西大学, Shiritsu Kansai Daigaku), then in 1920 as Kansai University (関西大学) before finally in 1922 being granted the official status of a university. Also in 1922 its main campus was moved to its present more extensive site in Suita City (a suburb of Osaka), thus paving the way for later growth. Its first graduate school was established in 1929. In consequence of the educational reforms carried out soon after the end of the Second World War, Kansai University was able to avail itself of the new system to expand its scope for tuition so as to comprise four faculties: those of Law, Letters, Economics and Commerce.

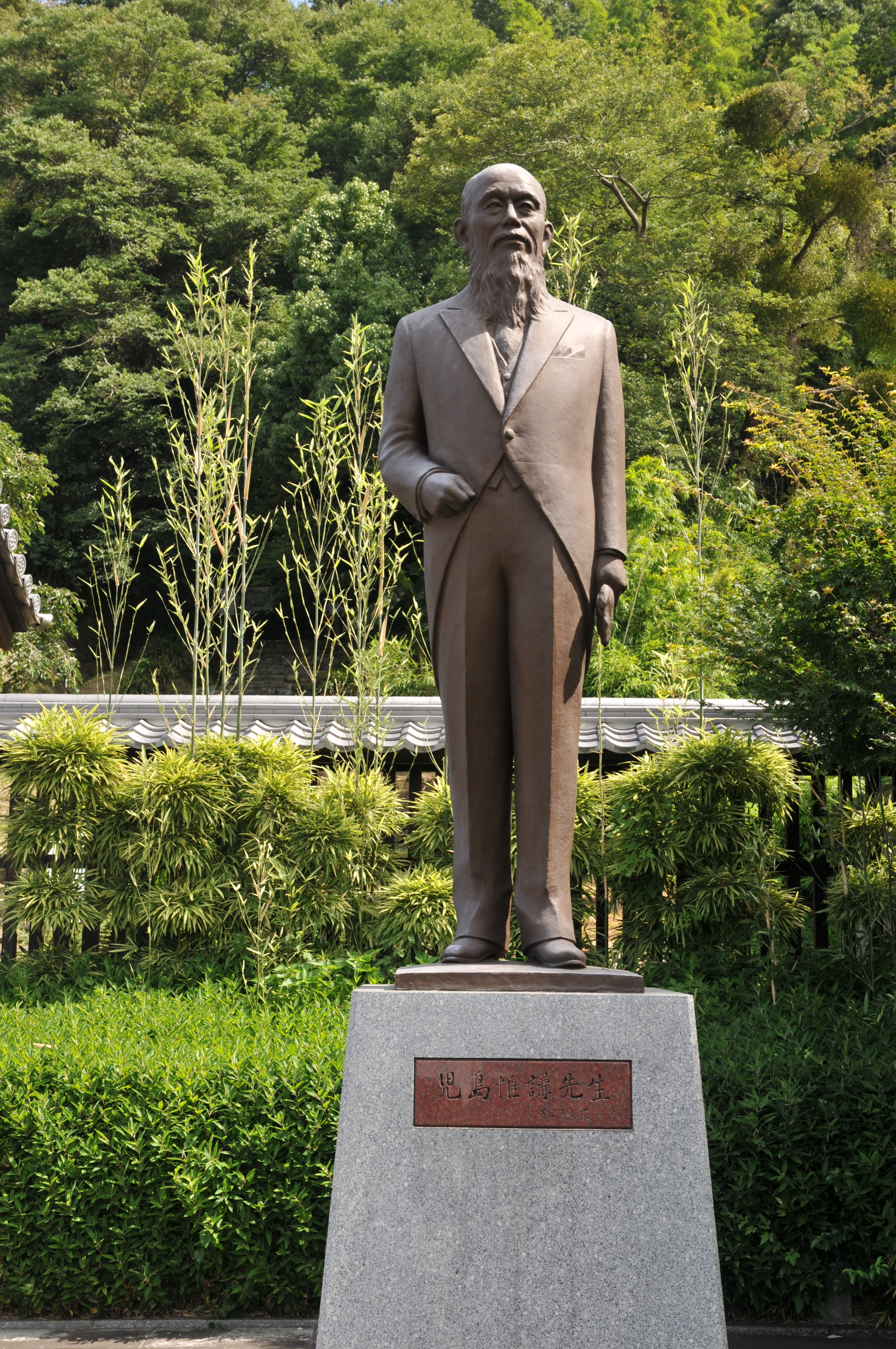
Statue of Kojima Korekata on Uwajima Castle

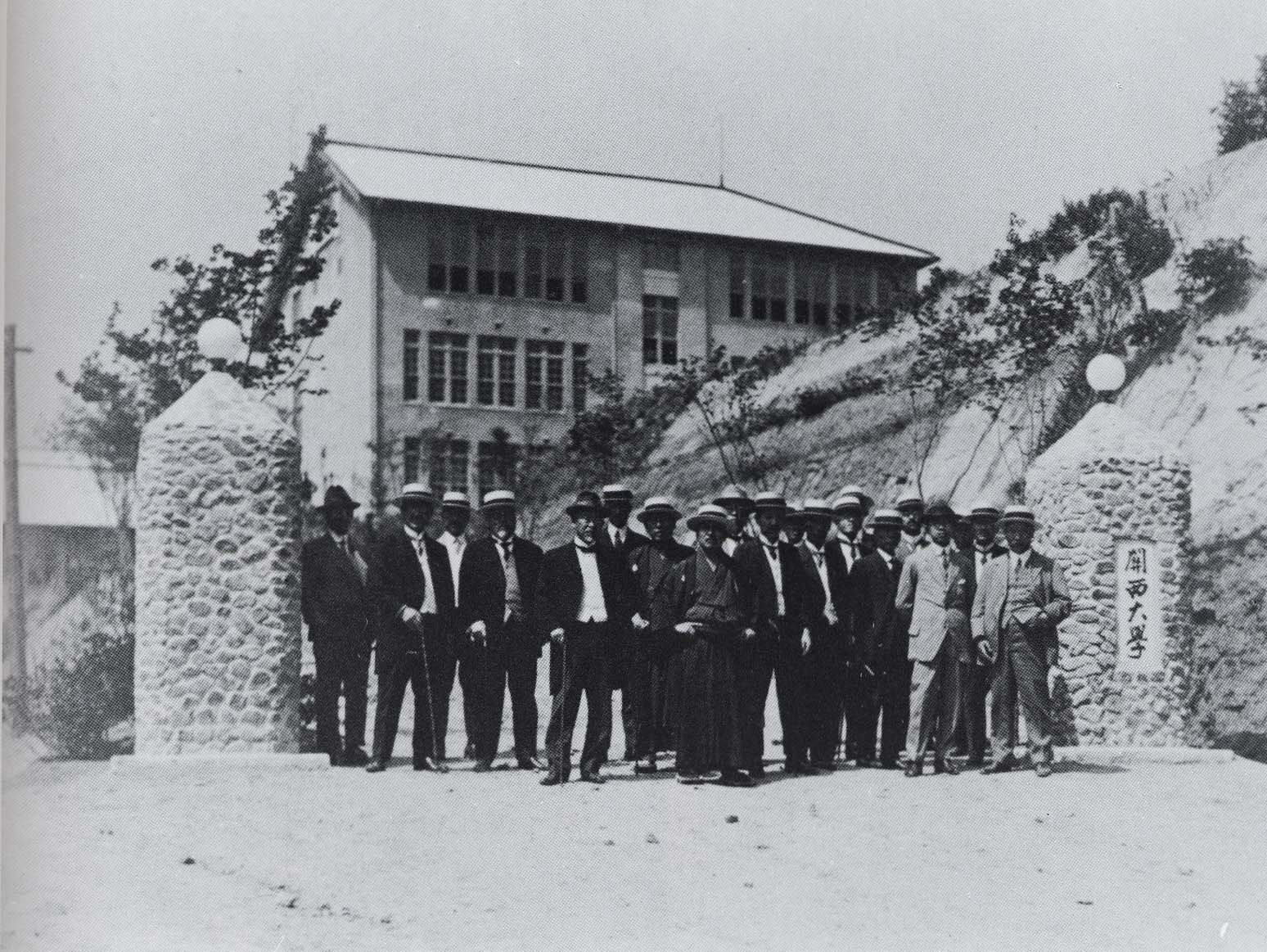
Senriyama Campus in 1923

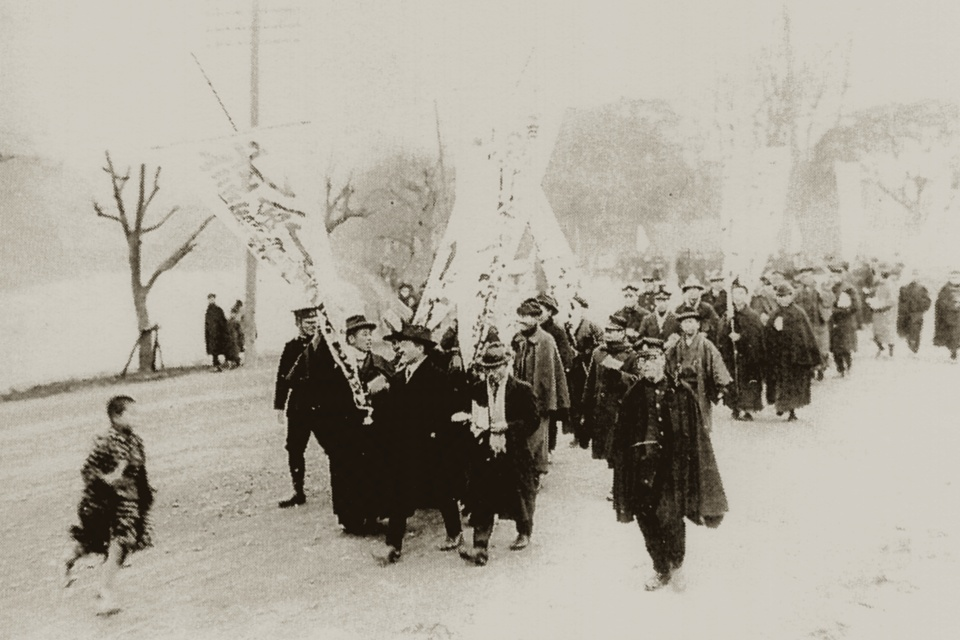
Kansai University students

With the start of the new university system in 1949, Kandai established the First Higher School (関西大学付属第一高等学校). Its Faculty of Engineering was founded in 1958, followed in 1967 by the founding of its Faculty of Sociology. In 1994 in response to the requirements of modern technology and communication, the Informatics faculty was instituted on another campus, created just outside the dormitory-town of Takatsuki City. Its Institute of Foreign Language Education and Research was inaugurated in 2000.

For many decades, the evening courses were taught on a separate campus, in the Tenroku (天六) area of Osaka. These originally constituted a night school for students, many of them working adults. In 1994 the evening course was moved to the Senriyama campus; in 2003, the university instituted an innovative 12-hour curriculum, integrating both day and evening courses.

=== 21st century ===
Thus, at present, Kansai University offers seven faculties in its undergraduate day school and five faculties (Engineering and Informatics being the exceptions) in its undergraduate evening school; it also offers graduate studies in all seven faculties, plus the independent graduate school staffed by members of its Institute of Foreign Language Education and Research.

The university, with its attached senior and junior high schools and kindergarten, has a total student body of 27,000. In 2016, Kansai University celebrated the 130th anniversary of its foundation.

The university made news in 2016 by announcing that it would prohibit its researchers from applying for Ministry of Defense grants for projects that could be diverted into military technologies, on the grounds that its researchers cannot be involved in activities counter to the peace and welfare of human beings.

== Campuses ==
=== Senriyama Campuse ===
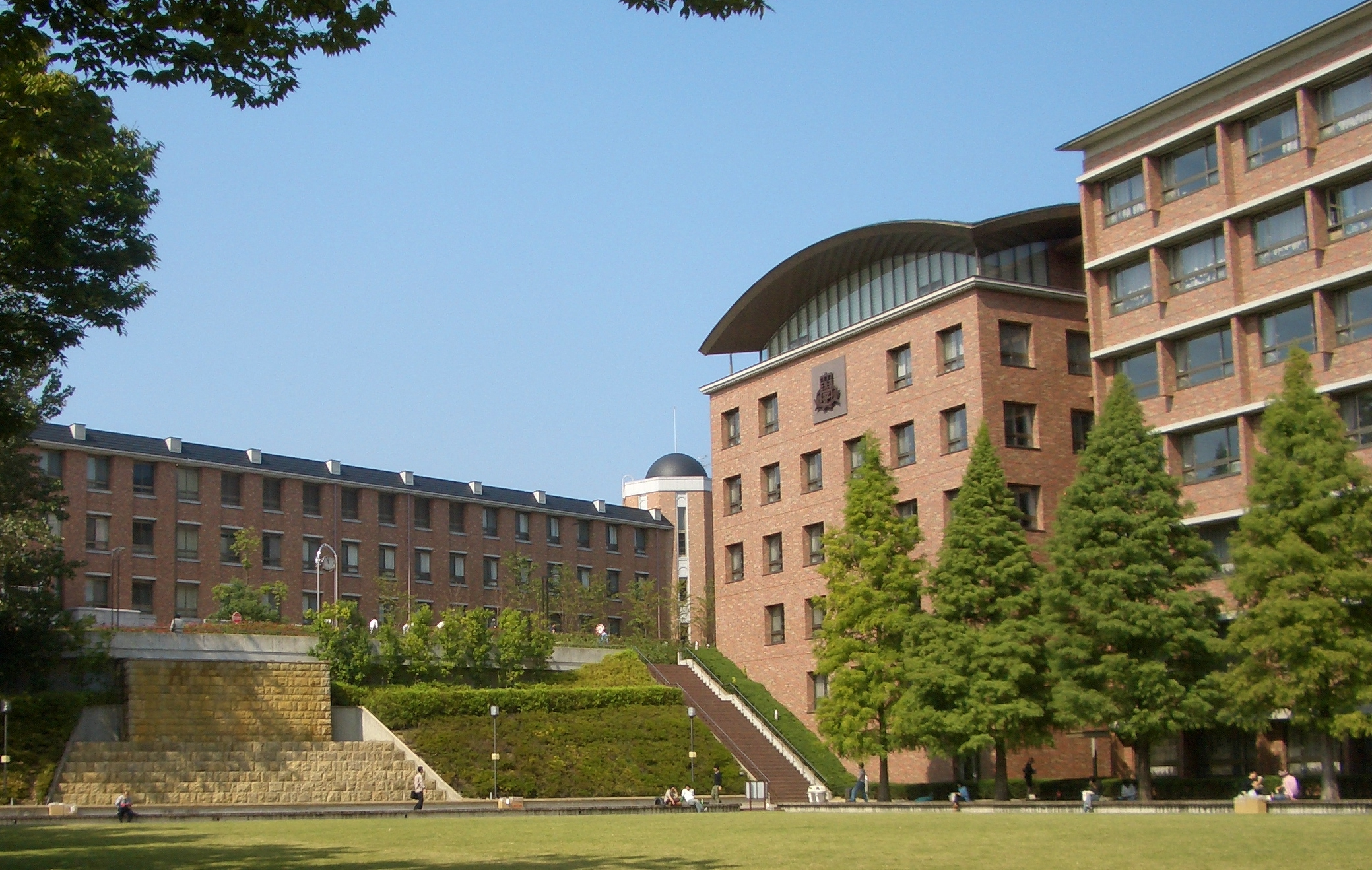
View of the central courtyard

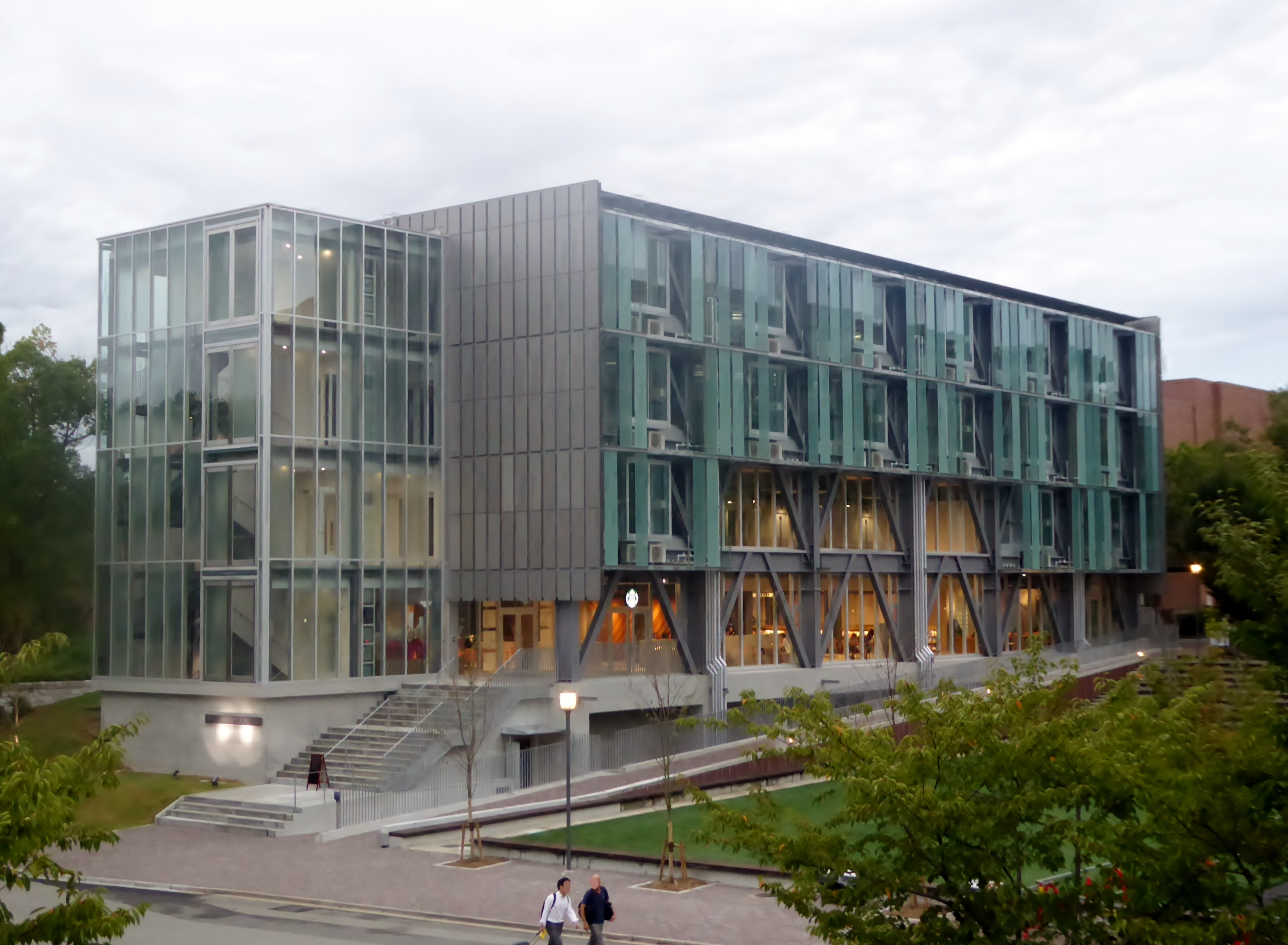
Center of Innovation and Creativity

The majority of Kansai University graduate and undergraduate studies are located in a residential area which is part of the Hanshinkan Modernism cultural area in Suita City, it is in a notable and historic suburb of and a wealthy area immediately northern of Greater Osaka. Today, the campus includes 50 buildings and sculpture gardens, fountains, museums, and a mix of architectural styles. Several buildings in the campus are listed as the Major Historical and Cultural Sites Protected at the National Level. There are several gates that lead into campus — East, West and South gates, with the Central Gate being the most well known for the painted seal on its ceiling.The university also operates the KU Hall, a professional performing arts center, Center for Innovation and Creativity, and the Museum of Archaeology.

==== Libraries and museums ====
The General Library is the largest single library in the Kansai University Library System, and is one of the largest buildings on the campus. The library system has a total library collection of more than 2.5 million volumes, which is one of Japan's largest academic collections. One can reserve a book at any library for collection of a book that may belong to another library in the system.

Kansai University Museum was founded in 1954 with a donation of objects from a scholar and statesman Kanda Takahira (1830–1898). The museum has three gallery floors and approximately 15,000 objects of archaeological, historical, ethnological, and art-craft contexts, as well as some important cultural property. Its most famous object is Takamatsuzuka Tomb. Notable items in museum include funerary objects that were excavated in Nara and date back thousands of years from the graves of royals of the Warring States period. There are ritual pottery vessels as well as elaborate pieces of jewelry on display. The five-story museum building was designed by the acclaimed architect Togo Murano (1891–1984, who also designed Grand Prince Hotel Takanawa and the main residence of Masahito, Prince Hitachi), the building was listed in the Registration tangible cultural property in 2007. The building served as the main library of the Kansai University until the construction of General Library in 1985. The museum sponsors lectures and events, and also runs an extensive program of outreach to local schools.

=== Tokyo Center ===
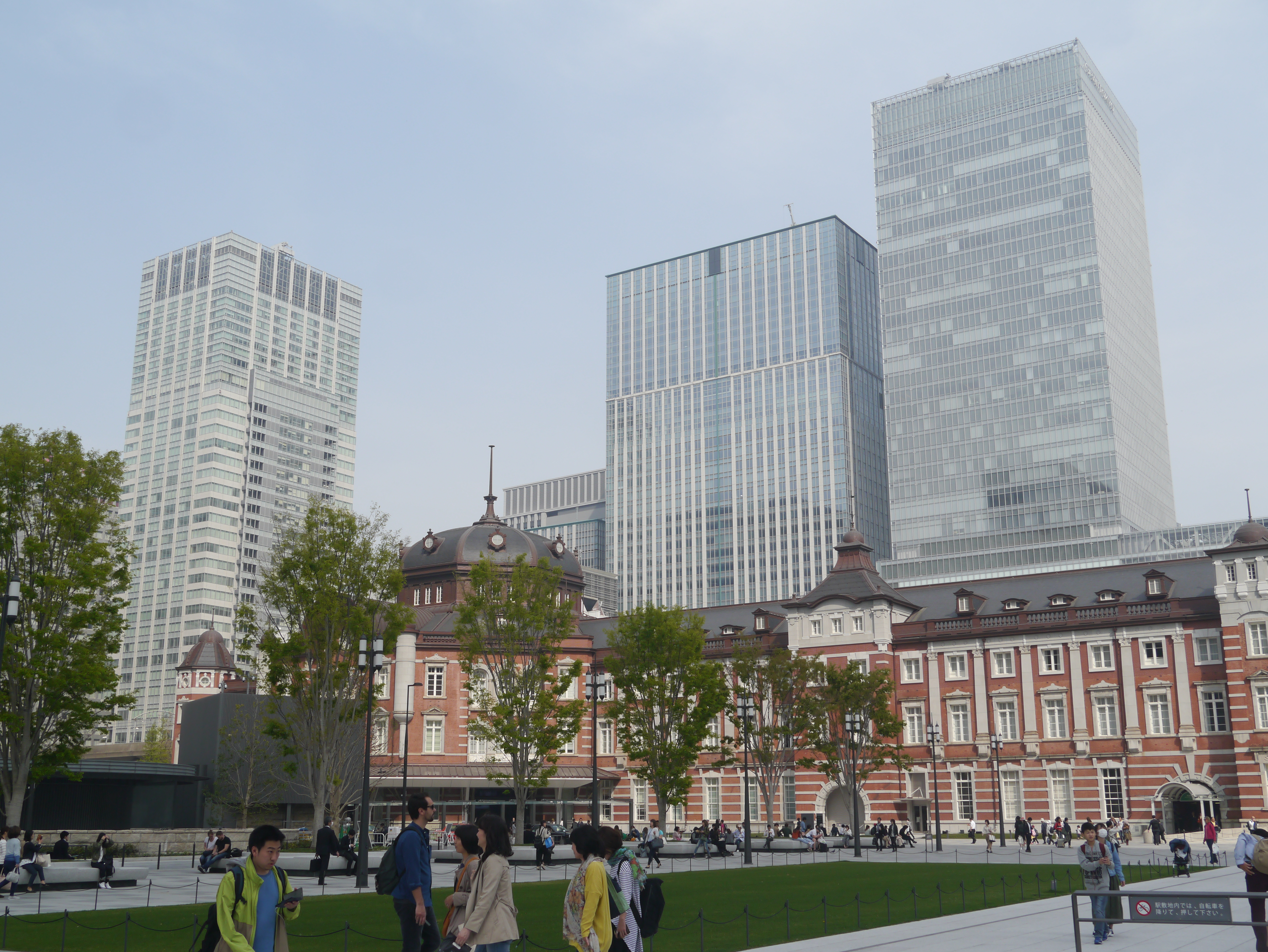
Tokyo Station, with the Sapia Tower to the left

The Tokyo Center is on the 9th floor of the Sapia Tower, next to Tokyo Station located directly in front of the gardens of the Imperial Palace. This campus is a base for information gathering and provision, the furthering of lifelong learning, and job placement support in the Tokyo metropolitan area. It is also the base of the Tokyo Alumni Association. The Tokyo Center staff help Kansai University students find work in Tokyo. Kansai University graduates living in Tokyo are there to support current students.

== Student life ==
=== Student body ===
Of those accepted for admission to the undergraduate class of 2018, 39 percent were female. Every year, there are approximately 1,000 international students studying at Kansai University. Its international students are made up of students from most countries in the world including most of Western Europe, North America, and South America, Asia, Australia and many countries in Africa. Kansai University also has a longstanding relationship with KU Leuven which operates a joint research center and base for Kansai University students and scholars at the European Center at KU Leuven, located in Leuven, Belgium.

Demographics of student body in 2016
	Undergraduate	Graduate(Master)	Graduate(Doctor)	Professional	Total
Total	28,568	1,273	287	219	31,090
Male	17,170	918	173	127	18,388
Female	11,398	355	114	92	11,959
International	381	362			743

=== Athletics ===
The athletic teams at Kansai University are known as the Kaisers and are primarily members of the Kansai Big 6. The Kansai-Kwansei Gakuin rivalry is a college rivalry between two universities located in Kansai, Japan.

== Academics ==
=== Rankings and reputation ===
==== General rankings ====
University rankings
Global
THE	General	801+

Regional
QS Asia (Asia version)	General	351–400

Program rankings
Social Sciences & Humanities

LAW

Natural Sciences & Technology

Engineering

Kansai University is one of the most prestigious universities in Japan, with particularly strong influence in the Kansai region. The university seeks to promote student and faculty exchange as well as collaborative research through memorandums of agreement signed with 133 partnership universities in 36 countries. According to a survey among 9,117 Japanese high school students about their favorite university, Recruit ranked Kansai university 1st place, as it has been for 13 consecutive years.

==== Popularity and selectivity ====
The number of applicants per place was 5.6 (79,903/14,203) in the 2020 undergraduate admissions. This number of applicants was 8th largest in Japan. Its entrance difficulty is also very selective. Nikkei BP has been publishing a ranking system called "Brand rankings of Japanese universities" every year, composed by the various indications related to the power of brand, and Kansai University was top in 4th in 2015 in Kansai Area.

==== Alumni rankings ====
Kansai University is renowned for its strong connection to business in the Kansai region, and according to the 2016 university rankings by Toyo Keizai, 351 alumni served as executives in listed companies. As of 2019, around 19.6% of undergraduates were able to enter one of the top 400 companies in Japan.

== Organization ==
=== Faculties and Undergraduate Degrees ===
School founding
School	Year founded
Faculty of Law	1886
Faculty of Economics	1905
Faculty of Business and Commerce	1906
Faculty of Letters	1928
Faculty of Engineering	1958
Faculty of Sociology	1967
Faculty of Informatics	1994
Faculty of Policy Studies	2007
Faculty of Foreign Language Studies	2009
Faculty of Societal Safety Sciences	2010
Faculty of Health and Well-being	2010

- Law
- Letters
- Economics
- Commerce
- Sociology
- Informatics
- Engineering
- Environmental and Urban Engineering
- Engineering Science
- Chemistry, Materials and Bioengineering
- Policy Studies
- MBA (Accounting only)
- Language teaching
- Psychology
- Institute of Foreign Language Education and Research
- Institute of Oriental and Occidental Studies
- Institute of Economic and Political Studies
- Organization of Research and Development of Innovative Science and Technology
- Institute of Legal Studies
- Institute of Human Rights Studies

=== Graduate Schools ===
- Law
- Letters
- Economics
- Business and Commerce
- Sociology
- Informatics
- Science and Engineering
- Foreign Language Education and Research
- Psychology
- Societal Safety Sciences
- East Asian Cultures. The Society for Cultural Interaction in East Asia (SCIEA) is an international academic society established to foster research and discussions on cultural interactions within East Asia and the Western world. SCIEA was officially founded after a series of international symposiums held at Fudan University in 2007 and 2008.
- Governance
- Health and Well-being

== Notable people ==
Law, Politicians

- Akira Nishino – Senior Vice Minister of Economy, Trade and Industry
- Canaan Banana – President of Zimbabwe
- Ken Harada – Minister of Economic Planning
- Kansei Nakano – Chairman of the National Public Safety Commission
- Kimihiro Uomoto – A hijacker of Japan Airlines Flight 351
- Tetsuzo Fuyushiba (B.A. 1960) – Minister of Land, Infrastructure and Transport
- Tatsuo Yada (B.A. 1971) – Mayor of Kobe
- Tomokatsu Kitagawa (B.A. 1974)
- Kiyoshige Maekawa (B.A. 1985)
- Takae Itō (B.A. 1991)
- Tomohiro Yamamoto (B.A. 1998)
- Yano Kenzo – Governor of Toyama Prefecture and Japanese Occupied West Coast Sumatra, Anti-war radical
- Yoshiyuki Arai

Authors

- Hideji Hōjō – Novelist and playwright
- Kanako Nishi (B.A. 2000) – Novelist, Naoki Prize winner
- Syougo Imamura – Novelist, Naoki Prize winner
- Kim Sok-pom – Novelist
- Takeshi Kimura – Novelist and playwright

Business

- Fumio Ōtsubo (B.A. 1971) – Chairman of the Board of Panasonic Co., Ltd.
- Kagemasa Kōzuki (B.A. 1966) – President & CEO of Konami Co., Ltd.
- Kinuji Kobayashi (B.A. 1909) – Manager of a New York branch office of South Manchuria Railway
- Kenichi Fujita (B.A. 1983) – President & CEO of Siemens Japan Co., Ltd.
- Manji Miyoshi (B.A. 1915) – President of Kintetsu Railway
- Soroya Sakamoto (B.A. 1893) – Founder of Bank of Taiwan
- Sakata Gengo – President of Yomiuri Shimbun Osaka Office
- Syukuo Ishikawa(B.A. 1978) – Bandai Namco Holdings Inc
- Shoji Ikawa – Executive Vice President of Toyota Motor Corporation
- Teizaburo Nishi (B.A. 1953) – Vice President of The Sumitomo Bank
- Tamio Yoshimatsu (B.A. 1969) – President & CEO of Coca-Cola Bottlers Japan Co., Ltd.
- Takeshi Gotō – Vice Chairman of IBM Japan, Ltd.
- Yoshio Nishimura (B.A. 1960) – Director, TV Asahi Co., Ltd./President & CEO, Asahi Broadcasting Corporation., Ltd.
- Yasutami Yamada (dropped out) – Founder of Rohto Pharmaceutical
- Yasutomo Hukuda (B.A. 1936) – President & CEO, Asahi Broadcasting Corporation., Ltd.
- Yoshihiro Yamane (B.A. 1967) – President & CEO, Nippon Television Network Co., Ltd.

Entertainment

- Hitomi Yaida (B.A. 2001) – J-pop/folk rock singer/songwriter and guitarist
- Kōji Tsuruta – Actor and singer
- Seiji Miyane – Announcer and television presenter
- Katsura Bunshi VI – Japanese TV presenter and rakugo artist
- Tomoyuki Tanaka (B.A. 1930) – Movie producer (creator of Godzilla)
- Takashi Shimura – Actor who appeared in over 30 films of Akira Kurosawa's
- Ryota Yamasato (B.A. 2000) – Comedian and television presenter
- Souitirou Tokuda (B.A. 2020) – Fuji TV journalist and the anchor of Mezamashi TV

Sports

- Kenkichi Oshima (B.A. 1930) – 1932 Summer Olympics Bronze Medalist
- Masamitsu Ichiguchi – 1964 Summer Olympics Gold Medalist
- Kim Chae-hwa – South Korean Figure Skating Championships Gold Medalist
- Nobunari Oda (B.A. 2008) – Figure skater, 2005 World Junior Figure Skating Championships Gold Medalist
- Tatsuki Machida (B.A. 2010) – Figure skater, 2014 World Figure Skating Championships Silver Medalist
- Kenshiro Teraji (B.A. 2014) – Professional boxer
- Daisuke Takahashi (Ph.D. 2015) – Figure skater, 2010 Winter Olympics Bronze Medalist
- Kiyou Shimizu (B.A. 2016) – Karateka competing 2020 Summer Olympics Silver Medalist, Special Award Miss Nippon
- Satoko Miyahara (B.A. 2020) – Figure skater, two time World Champion medalist

== See also ==
- List of universities in Japan
- College rivalry
- Private university
- Kansai Kaisers football
- Kandai-mae Station
- List of National Treasures of Japan (writings)
