= Hirose =

Hirose may refer to:

- Hirose Electric Group, a Japanese company specializing in the manufacture of connectors
- Hirose (surname), a Japanese surname
- Hirose-gawa, a river in Sendai, Japan
- Koichi Hirose (JoJo's Bizarre Adventure character)
