= Kansai Big Six Baseball League =

Japanese college baseball conference

- Classification: Single-elimination tournament
- Sport: Baseball
- First season: 1931 (reorganized 1982)
- No. of teams: 6 (since 1925)
- Headquarters: Osaka, Japan
- Region: Kansai, Japan
- Most recent champions: Kansai University (9th title)
- Most titles: Kindai University (36 titles)
- Broadcasters: KBS Kyoto, SKY PerfecTV!
- Website: KansaiBig6.jp

Locations

The Kansai Big6 Baseball League (関西学生野球連盟, Kansai gakusei yakyū renmei) is a collegiate baseball league located in central Kansai region of Japan, stretching from Hyōgo in the west to Kyoto in the east. The league joined the All Japan University Baseball Federation (JUBF) (全日本大学野球連盟, Zen'nihon daigaku yakyū renmei) in 1951.

== Members ==
| Institution | Location | Founded | Joined | Type | All-time record | Titles | Last title | Colors |
|---|---|---|---|---|---|---|---|---|
| Doshisha University | Kyoto, Japan | 1920 | 1931 | Private | | 8 | Fall 2011 | |
| Kansai University | Suita, Osaka | 1926 | 1931 | Private | | 9 | Fall 2023 | |
| Kindai University (Note: formerly Kinki University) | Higashiosaka, Osaka | 1949 | 1962 | Private | | 40 | Spring 2023 | |
| Kwansei Gakuin University | Nishinomiya, Hyōgo | 1932 | 1931 | Private | | 4 | Spring 2021 | |
| Kyoto University | Kyoto | 1897 | 1931 | Public | | — | — | |
| Ritsumeikan University | Kyoto | 1922 | 1931 | Private | | 22 | Spring 2019 | |

== National Championships ==
=== Champion ===
1956 - Kansai
1972 - Kansai
1988 - Kinki
1989 - Kinki
1997 - Kinki
1998 - Kinki

=== Runner-up ===
1952 - Kwansei Gakuin
1952 - Ritsumeikan
1959 - Kwansei Gakuin
1960 - Kansai
1961 - Doshisha
1965 - Ritsumeikan
1966 - Kinki
1970 - Kansai
1975 - OUC
1976 - OUC
1981 - Kinki
1983 - Kinki
1991 - Kansai
1992 - Ritsumeikan
1994 - Kinki
2005 - Kinki

=== Meiji Shrine Championships ===
==== Champion ====
1972 - Kansai
1978 - Doshisha
1989 - Doshisha
1990 - Kinki
1997 - Kinki

==== Runner-up ====
1983 - Kinki
1991 - Kansai
1992 - Ritsumeikan
1994 - Kinki
2005 - Kinki

== League Champions ==
Numbers in parentheses refer to the Fall season games.

Kinki - 14 (18)
Ritsumei - 8 (4)
Kansai - 2 (0)
Doshisha - 1 (4)
Kwansei Gakuin - 1 (0)
Kyoto - 0 (0)

== See also ==
- College baseball in Japan
- Tokyo Big6 Baseball League
