= Kazuki Iwamoto =

Japanese footballer

Personal information
- Full name: Kazuki Iwamoto
- Date of birth: 7 April 1997 (age 29)
- Place of birth: Osaka, Japan
- Height: 1.74 m (5 ft 9 in)
- Position: Midfielder

Team information
- Current team: Kamatamare Sanuki
- Number: 15

Youth career
- Mamedo FC
- Yokohama F. Marinos
- –2015: Gamba Osaka

College career
Years	Team	Apps	(Gls)
2016–2019	Kwansei Gakuin University		

Senior career*
Years	Team	Apps	(Gls)
2020–	Kamatamare Sanuki	140	(3)
- * Club domestic league appearances and goals as of 1 July 2026

Kazuki Iwamoto (岩本 和希, Iwamoto Kazuki; born 7 April 1997) is a Japanese footballer currently playing as a midfielder for Kamatamare Sanuki.

== Career ==
Kazuki made his debut for Kamatamare against Gamba Osaka U-23 on the 28 June 2020. He scored his first goal for the club against Azul Claro Numazu on the 1 May 2021, scoring in the 73rd minute.

== Career statistics ==
=== Club ===
As of 10 November 2020.

Club	Season	League			National Cup		League Cup		Other		Total	
Club	Season	Division	Apps	Goals	Apps	Goals	Apps	Goals	Apps	Goals	Apps	Goals
Kwansei Gakuin University	2018	–			3 (Note: Appearance(s) in Emperor's Cup)	1	–		0	0	3	1
Kwansei Gakuin University	2019	–			1	0	–		0	0	1	0
Kwansei Gakuin University	Total		0	0	4	1	0	0	0	0	4	1
Kamatamare Sanuki	2020	J3 League	25	0	0	0	–		0	0	25	0
Career total			25	0	4	1	0	0	0	0	19	1
