= Institute of Business and Accounting =

- 関西学院大学 経営戦略研究科
- Type: Private
- Established: 2005
- Parent institution: Kwansei Gakuin University
- Dean: Schumpeter Tamada
- Assistant Dean: Osamu Suzuki
- Location: 1-155 Uegahara Ichiban-cho, Nishinomiya, Hyōgo, 662-8501, Japan; 34.7692°N 135.3472°E
- Campus: 148 acres (60 ha); Urban
- Website: iba.kwansei.ac.jp

Kwansei Gakuin University Institute of Business and Accounting (IBA) is one of the professional schools of Kwansei Gakuin University, and one of Japan's leading management schools. The Institute of Business and Accounting comprises the Business School, and the Accounting School. The IBA is located in the city of Nishinomiya in Hyōgo prefecture. The Business School offers a full-time MBA program in International Business for recent graduates and a part-time Executive Education MBA program, while the Accounting School offers a full-time MAcc program. The school was founded in 2005 with an initial class of 162 students.

== See also ==
- Kwansei Gakuin University
- Business school
