= Yano Kenzo =

Japanese politician (1896–1981)

- 矢野兼三
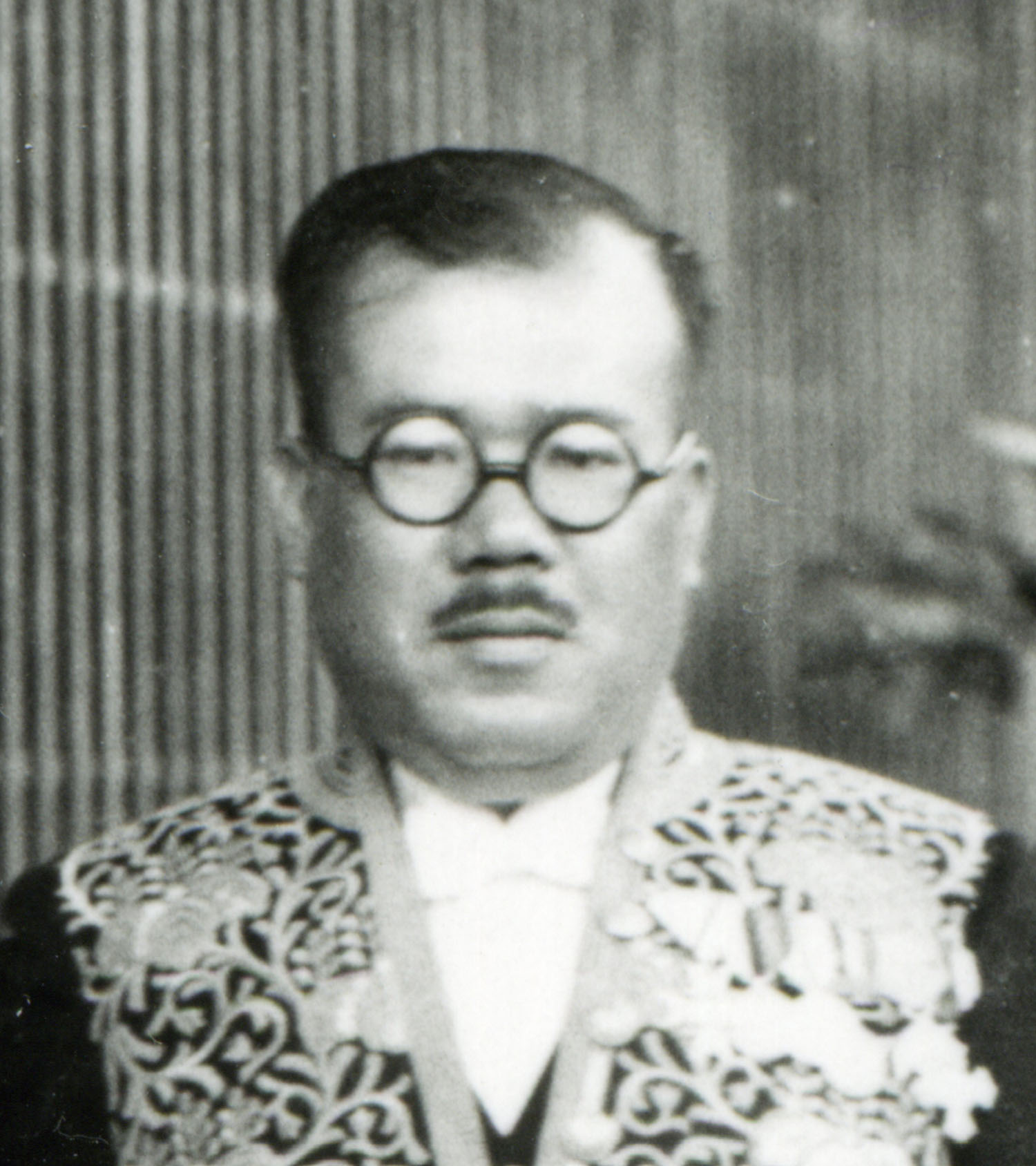
- Yano Kenzo in 1938

Governor of West Coast Sumatra
- In office 9 August 1942 – 31 March 1944
- Monarch: Hirohito
- Preceded by: Position established
- Succeeded by: Hattori Naoaki

Governor of Toyama Prefecture
- In office 18 April 1938 – 7 January 1941
- Monarch: Hirohito
- Preceded by: Toki Ginjiro
- Succeeded by: Machimura Kingo

Personal details
- Born: 13 September 1896 Osaka, Japan
- Died: 19 February 1981 (aged 84)
- Education: Kansai University (LLB)

Yano Kenzo (矢野兼三, Yano Kenzō; 13 September 1896 ‒ 19 February 1981) was a Japanese bureaucrat who served for the police force and the Imperial Japanese Army. He served as Governor of Toyama Prefecture from 1938 to 1941. Prior to that, he held positions in Kyoto, Chiba, Aomori, and Okayama Prefectures.

As a bureaucrat, Yano's career spanned from 1921. On 1 August 1942, he was assigned as Governor of West Sumatra, Indonesia, which was then occupied by the Japanese. However, due to his opposition to Japanese policies in the occupied territories, he resigned and ended his career as a bureaucrat at the end of March 1944. His pen name was Yomoya (蓬矢).

== Career ==
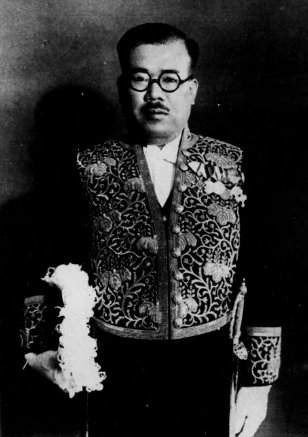
Yano Kenzo's official portrait

Yano Kanzo came from an Osaka family, the third son of Yabou Risaburo. After completing his studies at Kansai University School of Law in 1919, he worked at Sakura Cement. In October 1920, he passed the Civil Service Examination. In 1921, he was posted to the Japanese Ministry of the Interior and became a commissioned officer in the Social Affairs Bureau. Thereafter, he served as the mayor of Atago County in Kyoto Prefecture; an administrative officer at the Tokyo Metropolitan Police Department; secretary and head of the Aomori Prefecture Educational Affairs Department; secretary and head of the Chiba Prefecture Police Department; chief of the Tokyo Metropolitan Police Department Secretariat; and head of the General Affairs Department of Okayama Prefecture.

In April 1938, he was appointed Governor of Toyama Prefecture. He was instrumental in the wartime response. However, he resigned in January 1941. On 7 July 1942, he was appointed Chief Magistrate of Imperial Army Administration.

=== Governor of West Sumatra ===
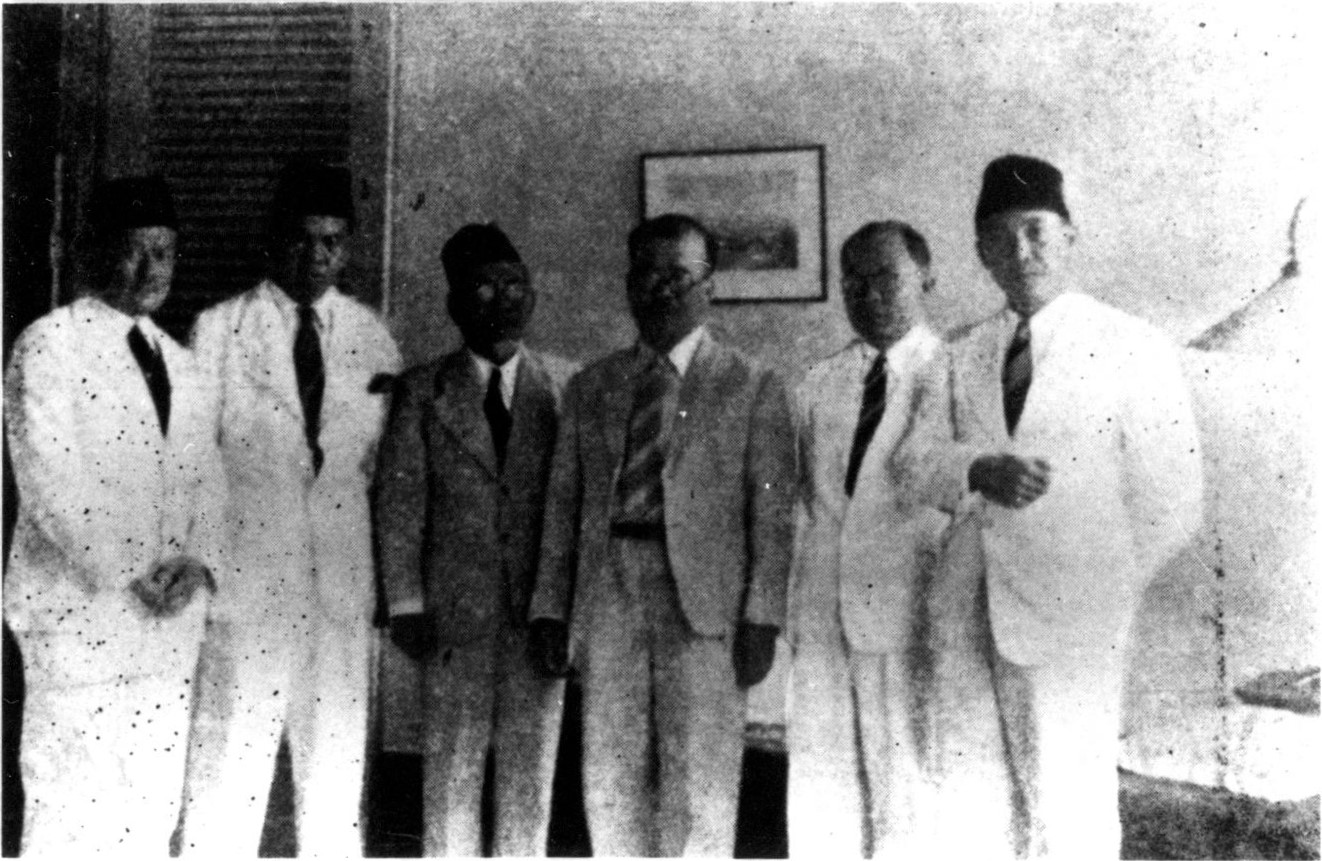
Yano Kenzo with the Founding Fathers of Indonesia. (left to right, Ali Sastroamidjojo, Mohammad Yamin, Agus Salim, Yano Kenzo, Mohammad Hatta, and Sukarno.)

In August 1942, Yano was appointed by the Imperial Japanese Army as Governor of West Sumatra, when the area was under the control of the 25th Division Army. He became the only civilian leader in the Japanese-occupied areas of Indonesia (other areas were led by the local military commander). Through culture, Yano Kenzo approached the Minangkabau people. He sympathised with the people's aspirations for independence and opposed the occupation government's policies that did not agree with his views. However, due to his differences, he resigned in protest at the end of March 1944. He was succeeded by Hattori Naoaki the following month.

One of Yano's legacies in office was the Kerukunan Minangkabau (Gui Gan), a body initiated to consolidate the power of the Minangkabau elite. (Note: Kerukunan Minangkabau was founded by Yano on October 1, 1942.) Its members came from each district and subdistrict, comprising nagari heads, adat heads, clerics, youth, and educated groups. They met regularly and acted as an informal advisory council to the governor. Historian Gusti Asnan notes that Kerukunan Minangkabau was an early form of the House of Representatives (DPR), which was later established by the occupation government in each shu or province of Indonesia.

== Post-war ==
After leaving the governorship and returning to his home country, Yano worked as an auditor for the Nagata Seiki company.

=== Role in the Sanmu incident ===
From his experience in the Dutch East Indies would led him to become a radical anti-war activist. He wrote about his views while serving as governor in West Sumatra in an article in 1967. Yano later taught the Three No's Principle (no taxation, no unemployment, and no war) to Toyosaku Kawanami, the mastermind of the Sanmu incident in 1961, a coup d'état attempt against the Japanese government. He was also an advisor to the Japan Industrial Development Corporation, which was established under Kawanami's influence.

== Publications ==
- "Factory Disaster Assistance Theory: Commentary on Factory Assistance Laws", Sanseido, 1931.
- "Factory Scenery" Ichibankan Printing Publishing Department, 1931.
- "Factories and Regional System", Tokyo Factory Association, 1932.
- "Essays: Travelling around the Village" (Yano Yoya), Koshi Shobo, 1939.
- "Listening to the Regular Meeting", Toyama Prefecture Association of Town and Village Mayors, 1940.
- "Pickle Stone: The Elegance of Being a Human Official", Daiichi Koronsha, 1941.
- "Standing at the Gun's Muzzle", Shinseikai Publishing Department, 1961.
- "Prison Diaries: The Hidden Story of the Cruel End of the War", Chobunsha, 1962.

== Honors ==
- August 15, 1940 (Showa 15) – Commemorative medal for the 2,600th anniversary of the founding of the Empire of Japan.

== See also ==
- Japanese occupation of West Sumatra

== Bibliography ==
- Bahar, Saafroedin (2015). Etnik, Elite dan Integrasi Nasional. Yogyakarta: GRE Publishing. ISBN 978-602-7677-56-2.
- Kahin, Audrey Richey (2005). Dari Pemberontakan ke Integrasi: Sumatera Barat dan Politik Indonesia, 1926–1998. Yayasan Obor Indonesia. ISBN 979-461-519-6.
- Nino, Oktorino (2013). Ensiklopedia Pendudukan Jepang di Indonesia. Jakarta: Elex Media Komputindo.
