= Tomoyuki Hirose =

Japanese footballer

Personal information
- Date of birth: 3 September 1994 (age 32)
- Place of birth: Hokkaido, Japan
- Height: 1.85 m (6 ft 1 in)
- Position: Defender

Team information
- Current team: Vanraure Hachinohe
- Number: 17

Youth career
- Usu SSS
- North Shonan SS
- –2012: Hokkaido Otani Muroran HS
- 2013–2016: Josai International University

Senior career*
Years	Team	Apps	(Gls)
2017–2018	Tokyo Musashino United	26	(3)
2019–2020	ReinMeer Aomori	27	(2)
2021–	Vanraure Hachinohe	3	(0)
- * Club domestic league appearances and goals as of 17:04, 13 July 2021 (UTC)

Tomoyuki Hirose (廣瀬 智行, Hirose Tomoyuki; born 1 November 1997) is a Japanese footballer currently playing as a defender for Vanraure Hachinohe.

== Career statistics ==
=== Club ===
As of 13 July 2021.

Club	Season	League			National Cup		League Cup		Other		Total	
Club	Season	Division	Apps	Goals	Apps	Goals	Apps	Goals	Apps	Goals	Apps	Goals
Tokyo Musashino United	2017	JFL	8	0	0	0	–		0	0	8	0
Tokyo Musashino United	2018	JFL	18	3	0	0	–		0	0	18	3
Tokyo Musashino United	Total		26	3	0	0	0	0	0	0	26	3
ReinMeer Aomori	2019	JFL	22	2	0	0	–		0	0	22	2
ReinMeer Aomori	2020	JFL	5	0	4 (Note: Appearances in the Emperor's Cup)	0	–		0	0	9	0
ReinMeer Aomori	Total		27	2	4	0	0	0	0	0	31	2
Vanraure Hachinohe	2021	J3 League	3	0	2	0	–		0	0	5	0
Career total			56	4	6	0	0	0	0	0	62	4
