= George Hirose =

Japanese-American photographer

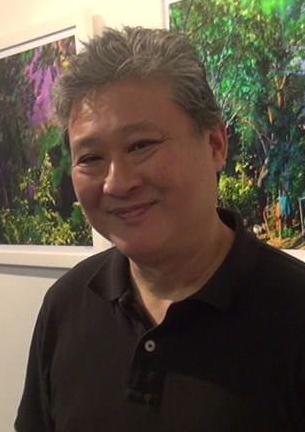
- Hirose at an exhibit
- Born: George Hirose; Bronx, New York City
- Known for: Photographer

George Hirose is a New York City based Japanese-American photographer. He was born in the Bronx, and teaches at Pratt Institute. In 2013, his project to capture all 39 of the East Village gardens was covered by The New York Times. His photos were always taken at night. In 2008 he published an art book called Blue Nights.
