= Saihei Hirose =

Japanese businessman

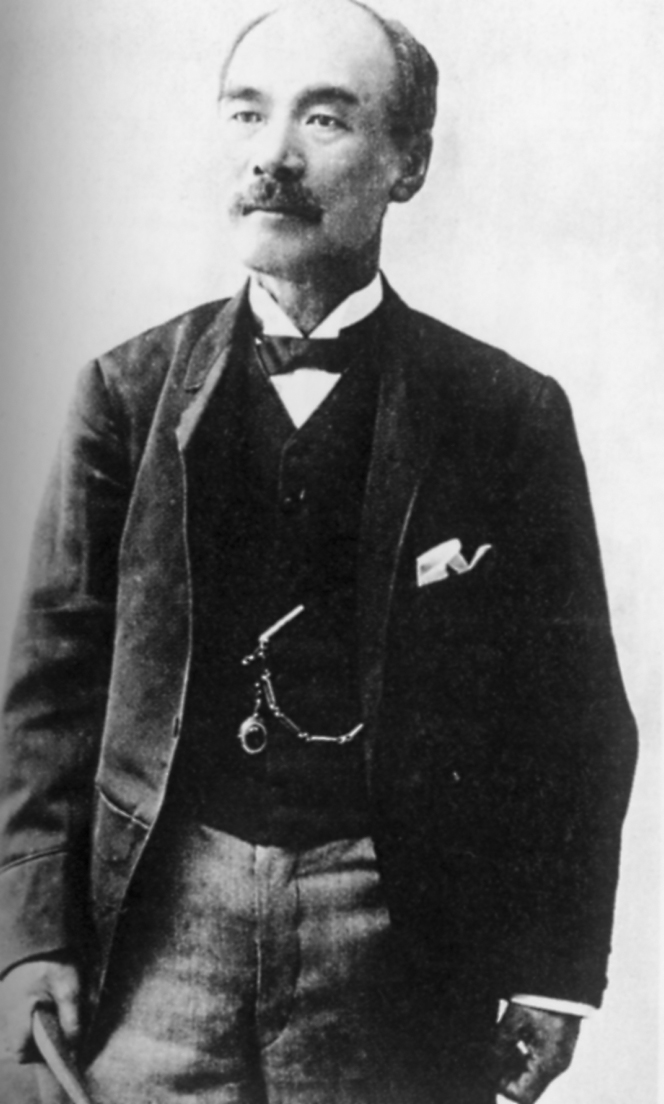
- Born: June 16, 1828; Ōmi Province
- Died: 1914 (aged 85–86)
- Occupation: mining executive

Saihei Hirose (June 16, 1828 – 1914) was a Japanese mining businessman and former head of the board of directors of Sumitomo Zaibatsu from 1877 to 1894. Prior to that, he was manager of the Besshi copper mine, which he extensively modernised using Western technology.

There is a museum dedicated to him in Niihama, called the Hirose Memorial Museum.
