= Ryo Takano =

Japanese footballer

Ryo Takano 高野 遼
Personal information
- Full name: Ryo Takano
- Date of birth: November 13, 1994 (age 31)
- Place of birth: Yamato, Kanagawa, Japan
- Height: 1.71 m (5 ft 7 1/2 in)
- Position: Left back

Team information
- Current team: Matsumoto Yamaga FC
- Number: 15

Youth career
- 2000–2012: Yokohama F. Marinos

College career
Years	Team	Apps	(Gls)
2013–2016	Nippon Sport Science University		

Senior career*
Years	Team	Apps	(Gls)
2015	→ Shonan Bellmare (loan)	0	(0)
2016	→ Yokohama F. Marinos (loan)	0	(0)
2017–2021	Yokohama F. Marinos	27	(0)
2017	→ Ventforet Kofu (loan)	42	(1)
2021–2023	Júbilo Iwata	10	(0)
2024–2026	SC Sagamihara	70	(2)
2026–	Matsumoto Yamaga FC	3	(0)
Medal record
Yokohama F. Marinos
Runner-up	Emperor's Cup	2017
- * Club domestic league appearances and goals as of 24 August 2026

Ryo Takano (高野 遼, Takano Ryo; born November 13, 1994) is a Japanese professional footballer who plays as a left back for J.League club Matsumoto Yamaga FC.

== Career ==
Ryo Takano joined J1 League club; Shonan Bellmare in 2015. May 20, he debuted in J.League Cup (v Matsumoto Yamaga FC). In 2016, he moved to Yokohama F. Marinos.

== Club statistics ==
Updated to 19 December 2020.

Appearances and goals by club, season and competition
Club	Season	League			Emperor's Cup		J. League Cup		Asia		Other		Total	
Club	Season	Division	Apps	Goals	Apps	Goals	Apps	Goals	Apps	Goals	Apps	Goals	Apps	Goals
Shonan Bellmare	2015	J1 League	0	0	0	0	1	0	—		—		1	0
Yokohama F. Marinos	2016	J1 League	0	0	0	0	3	0	—		—		3	0
Yokohama F. Marinos	2017	J1 League	0	0	1	0	4	0	—		—		5	0
Ventforet Kofu	2017	J1 League	8	1	—		—		—		—		8	1
Ventforet Kofu	2018	J2 League	34	0	3	0	6	0	—		—		43	0
Yokohama F. Marinos	2019	J1 League	5	0	0	0	0	0	—		—		5	0
Yokohama F. Marinos	2020	J1 League	13	0	—		1	0	4	0	0	0	18	0
Career total			60	1	4	0	15	0	4	0	0	0	83	1

== Honours ==
=== Club ===
Yokohama F. Marinos

- J1 League (1): 2019
