= Kota Mori =

Japanese footballer

Kota Mori 森 晃太
Personal information
- Full name: Kota Mori
- Date of birth: 13 June 1997 (age 29)
- Place of birth: Anjō, Japan
- Height: 1.75 m (5 ft 9 in)
- Position: Forward

Team information
- Current team: FC Imabari
- Number: 8

Youth career
- 2004–2015: Nagoya Grampus

Senior career*
| Years | Team | Apps | (Gls) |
| 2016–2019 | Ventforet Kofu | 33 | (2) |
| 2020–2021 | Renofa Yamaguchi | 31 | (0) |
| 2021–2025 | Fukushima United | 148 | (26) |
| 2026– | FC Imabari | 17 | (1) |
- * Club domestic league appearances and goals as of 17 August 2026

Kota Mori (森 晃太, Mori, Kota; born 13 June 1997 in Anjō) is a Japanese footballer who plays for FC Imabari.

== Youth career ==
Mori was a youth player for Nagoya Grampus. He scored 2 goals against AZ Alkmaar in the 2015 J.League International Youth Cup.

== Career ==
=== Ventforet Kofu ===
On 26 November 2015, Mori was announced at Ventforet Kofu from the 2016 season. He made his league debut against Gamba Osaka on 6 March 2016. Mori scored his first professional goal in the Levain Cup in March 2018.

=== Renofa Yamaguchi ===
Mori made his league debut against Kyoto Sanga on 23 February 2020. On 23 December 2020, Mori's contract was extended.

=== Fukushima United ===
On 13 July 2021, Mori was announced at Fukushima United. He scored on his league debut against FC Gifu on 28 August 2021, scoring in the 79th minute.

== International career ==
In June 2013, Mori was selected for a training camp held in Kyoto.

== Career statistics ==
Updated to 2 January 2020.

Appearances and goals by club, season and competition
| Club | Season | League | | | Emperor's Cup | | J.League Cup | | Total | |
| Club | Season | Division | Apps | Goals | Apps | Goals | Apps | Goals | Apps | Goals |
|---|---|---|---|---|---|---|---|---|---|---|
| Ventforet Kofu | 2016 | J1 League | 14 | 0 | 1 | 0 | 4 | 0 | 19 | 0 |
| Ventforet Kofu | 2017 | J1 League | 0 | 0 | 0 | 0 | 2 | 0 | 2 | 0 |
| Ventforet Kofu | 2018 | J2 League | 9 | 1 | 3 | 0 | 8 | 2 | 20 | 3 |
| Ventforet Kofu | 2019 | J2 League | 10 | 1 | 3 | 1 | – | | 13 | 2 |
| Career total | | | 33 | 2 | 7 | 1 | 14 | 2 | 54 | 5 |
