= Iwao Hirose =

Japanese philosopher and economist (born 1970)

Iwao Hirose (広瀬 巌 (Hirose Iwao), born 1970) is a Japanese philosopher and economist. He is currently professor and Canada Research Chair in Value Theory and the Philosophy of Public Policy at McGill University.

== Background ==
Iwao Hirose was educated at Waseda University and at University of St Andrews, where he received a PhD. He previously taught at University College, Oxford and Harvard University. In the Spring of 2021, he was a Fellow at the Swedish Collegium for Advanced Study in Uppsala, Sweden.

== Published works ==
- Hirose, Iwao; Reisner, Andrew Evan (2015). Weighing and reasoning: themes from the philosophy of John Broome. Oxford University Press. ISBN 978-0-19-968490-8. OCLC 909191304.
- Hirose, Iwao; Olson, Jonas (2015). The Oxford handbook of Value Theory. Oxford University Press. ISBN 978-0-19-022143-0. OCLC 970346013.
- Iwao Hirose. Moral Aggregation. Oxford University Press, 2014.
- Greg Bognar and Iwao Hirose. The Ethics of Rationing Health Care. Routledge, 2014.
- Iwao Hirose. Egalitarianism. Routledge, 2014.
  - Hirose, Iwao (2019), Egalitarianism, OCLC 1089994676 DAISY text audiobook.
- "Prioritarianism and Egalitarianism", forthcoming in Brooks, T. (ed.) New Waves in Ethics. Palgrave Macmillan (2009).
- "Should we select people randomly?", Bioethics.
- "Reconsidering the value of equality", Australasian Journal of Philosophy, (May, 2009).
- "Why be formal?", in Leopold, D. and M. Stears, (eds.) Political Theory: Methods and Approaches. Oxford University Press (2008).
- "Aggregation and non-utilitarian moral theories", Journal of Moral Philosophy, 4 (2007).
- "Weighted lotteries in life and death cases", Ratio, 20 (2007).
- "Intertemporal distributive judgments", Ethical Theory and Moral Practice, 8 (2005).
- "Aggregation and numbers", Utilitas, 16 (2004).
- "Saving the greater number without combining claims", Analysis, 61 (2001).
