= Riku Hirosue =

Japanese footballer

Riku Hirosue 廣末 陸
Personal information
- Full name: Riku Hirosue
- Date of birth: July 6, 1998 (age 28)
- Place of birth: Adachi, Tokyo, Japan
- Height: 1.83 m (6 ft 0 in)
- Position: Goalkeeper

Team information
- Current team: ReinMeer Aomori

Youth career
- 2011–2013: FC Tokyo
- 2014–2016: Aomori Yamada High School

Senior career*
| Years | Team | Apps | (Gls) |
| 2017–2018 | FC Tokyo U-23 | 27 | (0) |
| 2017–2020 | FC Tokyo | 0 | (0) |
| 2019 | → Renofa Yamaguchi (loan) | 0 | (0) |
| 2020 | → Machida Zelvia (loan) | 0 | (0) |
| 2021– | ReinMeer Aomori | 109 | (4) |
Medal record
Representing Japan
AFC U-19 Championship
| Gold medal – first place | 2016 Bahrain |
- * Club domestic league appearances and goals as of 18 January 2020

Riku Hirosue (廣末 陸, Hirosue Riku; born July 6, 1998) is a Japanese football player. He plays for ReinMeer Aomori.

== Career ==
Riku Hirosue joined J1 League club FC Tokyo in 2017.

== Club statistics ==
Updated to 22 February 2020.

| Club performance | | | League | | Cup | | League Cup | | Total | |
| Season | Club | League | Apps | Goals | Apps | Goals | Apps | Goals | Apps | Goals |
| Japan | | | League | | Emperor's Cup | | J. League Cup | | Total | |
|---|---|---|---|---|---|---|---|---|---|---|
| 2017 | FC Tokyo | J1 League | 0 | 0 | 0 | 0 | 0 | 0 | 0 | 0 |
| 2017 | FC Tokyo U-23 | J3 League | 12 | 0 | – | | – | | 12 | 0 |
| 2018 | FC Tokyo | J1 League | 0 | 0 | 0 | 0 | 0 | 0 | 0 | 0 |
| 2018 | FC Tokyo U-23 | J3 League | 15 | 0 | – | | – | | 15 | 0 |
| 2019 | Renofa Yamaguchi | J2 League | 0 | 0 | 1 | 0 | – | | 1 | 0 |
| Total | | | 27 | 0 | 1 | 0 | 0 | 0 | 28 | 0 |
