= Kwansei Gakuin University =

Private university in Hyōgo, Japan

- 関西学院大学
- Motto: 奉仕のための練達 (Hōshi no Tame no Rentatsu)
- Motto in English: Mastery for Service
- Type: Private
- Established: September 28, 1889; 136 years ago
- Religious affiliation: United Church of Christ in Japan
- Academic affiliations: ACUCA
- Endowment: ¥196.9 billion (2022) (1.33 billion USD)
- Chancellor: Motoo Nakamichi
- President: Yasutoshi Mori
- Chair of the Board of Trustees: Ippei Murakami
- Faculty: 786 (2023)
- Administrative staff: 523 (2023)
- Students: 25,679 (2023)
- Undergraduates: 24,314 (2023)
- Postgraduates: 1,365 (2023)
- Other students: 1,040 International Students (2023)
- Location: 1-155 Uegahara Ichiban-cho, Nishinomiya, Hyōgo, 662-8501, Japan; 34.7692°N 135.3472°E
- Campus: 148 acres (60 ha); Urban
- Colors: Blue, White, and Yellow
- Nickname: Fighters
- Sporting affiliations: Kansai Big Six
- Mascot: Soraran
- Website: global.kwansei.ac.jp

Kwansei Gakuin University (関西学院大学, Kansei Gakuin Daigaku), colloquially known as Kangaku (関学), is a private, non-denominational Christian coeducational university in Japan. The university offers Bachelor's, Master's, and Doctoral degrees to around 25,000 students in almost 40 different disciplines across 11 undergraduate and 14 graduate programs. Kwansei Gakuin's main campus is the Nishinomiya Uegahara Campus, the university's other campuses consist of the Kobe Sanda, Nishinomiya Seiwa, Nishinomiya Kitaguchi, Osaka Umeda, and Tokyo Marunouchi campuses. Kwansei Gakuin University has been selected for inclusion in the Japanese government's Top Global University Project as a Type B (Global Traction) university. The university is often referred to as one of the four leading private universities in the greater Kansai region.

== Overview ==
=== School name ===
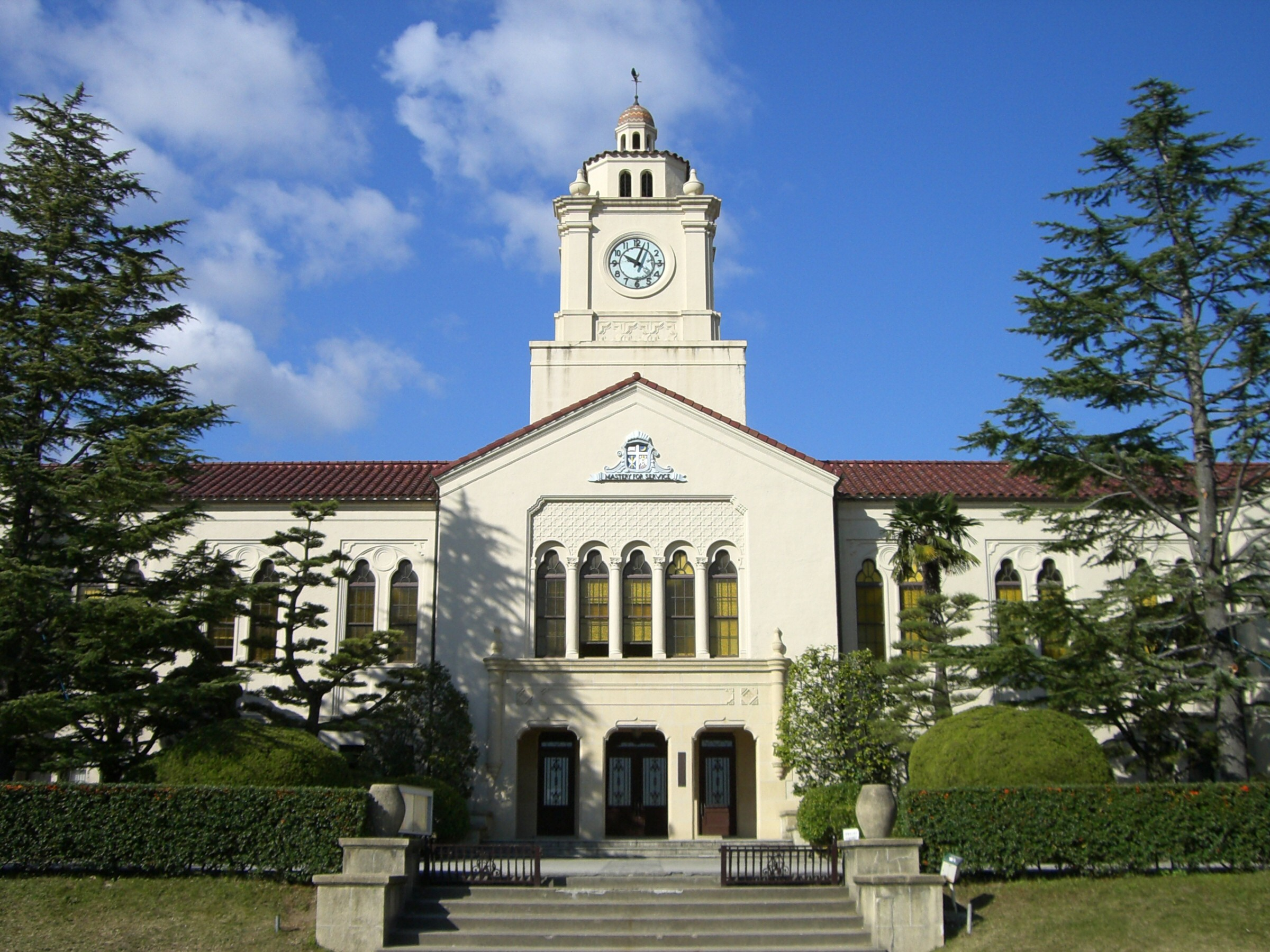
The clock tower on the Nishinomiya Uegahara Campus, the symbol of Kwansei Gakuin University

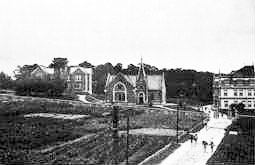
The former Kobe Harada-no-Mori Campus

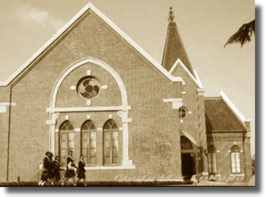
Branch Memorial Chapel

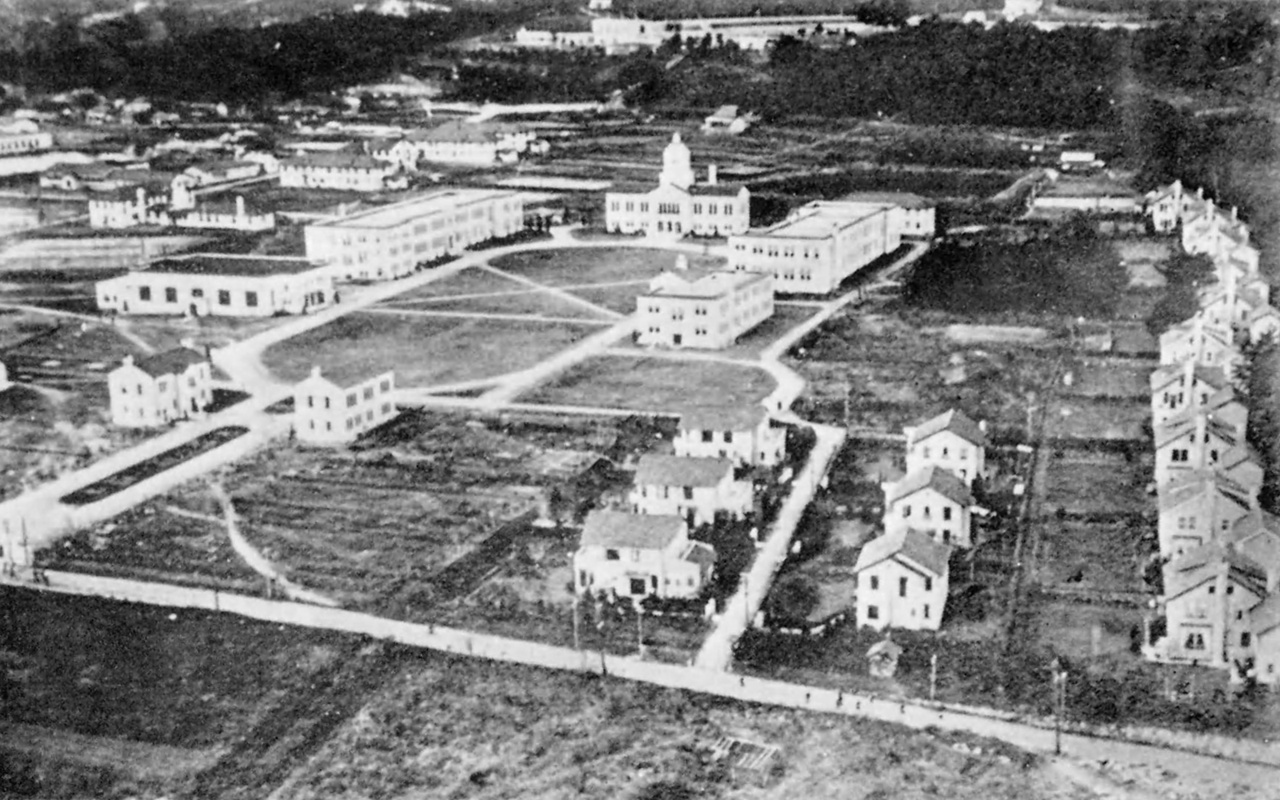
The Nishinomiya Uegahara Campus in 1929

The name Kwansei Gakuin (関西学院, Kansei Gakuin) originated from the desire of Walter Russell Lambuth, the university's founder, to serve citizens of Kansai (関西), the western part of Japan, while the word Gakuin (学院) means "college". The unusual romanization of Kansai as Kwansei is due to the way it would have been pronounced by progressive students in the late 19th century when Kan-on pronunciations were seen as more educated. The "official" pronunciation of Kwan can be heard in performances of the school song, but the modern pronunciation of Kan is the standard in other contexts. Though the university is commonly referred to as Kangaku, it would also be correct to say Kwangaku.

=== School motto ===
In the context of "Mastery for Service", a "master" is an accomplished person in terms of their humanity, learning, and daily life. Kwansei Gakuin's avowed goal is to help students "master their God-given gifts in order to serve their neighbors, society, and the world."

=== School symbol ===
Kwansei Gakuin's symbol, the crescent moon, represents the purpose of education: students' growth to fullness in knowledge and wisdom.

=== International relations ===
Kwansei Gakuin University has agreements with several United Nations organizations. The university and United Nations Volunteers (UNV) reached an agreement establishing the university as the first institution of higher education in Asia to form a volunteer-sending partnership with the United Nations Information Technology Service (UNITeS) in 2003. KGU and the United Nations High Commissioner for Refugees (UNHCR) representation in Japan agreed to establish a special university scholarship system for refugees in Japan in May 2006. Under this agreement, Kwansei Gakuin started the UNHCR-KGU Higher Education Program for Refugees in Japan in April 2007, and two refugees were enrolled.

== Academics and organization ==
=== Undergraduate departments ===
- School of Theology (established in 1952)
- School of Humanities (1934)
- School of Sociology (1960)
- School of Law and Politics (1948)
- School of Economics (1934)
- School of Business Administration (1951)
- School of Science and Technology (1961–2000 Nishinomiya Uegahara Campus, 2001–2021 Kobe-Sanda Campus)
- School of Science（2021, Kobe-Sanda Campus）
- School of Engineering（2021, Kobe-Sanda Campus）
- School of Biological and Environmental Sciences（2021, Kobe-Sanda Campus）
- School of Architecture（2021, Kobe-Sanda Campus）
- School of Policy Studies (1995, Kobe-Sanda Campus)
- School of Human Welfare Studies (2008)
- School of Education (2009, Nishinomiya-Seiwa Campus)
- School of International Studies (2010)

=== Postgraduate departments ===
==== Graduate schools ====
- Graduate School of Theology (1952)
- Graduate School of Humanities (1950)
- Graduate School of Sociology (1961)
- Graduate School of Law and Politics (1950)
- Graduate School of Economics (1950)
- Graduate School of Business Administration (1953)
- Graduate School of Science and Technology (1965, Kobe-Sanda Campus)
- Graduate School of Policy Studies (2001, Kobe-Sanda Campus)
- Graduate School of Language, Communication, and Culture (2001)
- Graduate School of Human Welfare Studies (2010)
- Graduate School of Education (2009)

==== Professional schools (KGPS) ====
- Law School
- Institute of Business and Accounting

== Study abroad agreements ==
Kwansei Gakuin University has over 140 partner institutions overseas and accepts more than 700 international students each year.

== Campus locations ==
Since 1929, the university's flagship Uegahara campus has been located in Nishinomiya, Hyōgo. The Uegahara campus was designed in a "Spanish Mission" style by William Merrell Vories (1880-1964), an American missionary, architect, educator, and entrepreneur. In 2017, the campus won an achievement award for its design from the Architectural Institute of Japan. This campus is home to most of the administrative offices of Kwansei Gakuin.

The Nishinomiya Seiwa Campus (2009–present) is home to the School of Education and Seiwa Junior College. It is 10 minutes away from the Nishinomiya Uegahara Campus on foot.

The Kobe Sanda Campus (1995–present) is located in Sanda, Hyōgo, and houses the School of Policy Studies and the School of Science and Technology. It has the same architectural style as its Nishinomiya-Uegahara predecessor and is about an hour to 70 minutes from Nishinomiya by shuttle bus.

The Osaka Umeda Campus (2004–present) is located a short walk from the main public transport cluster of Osaka City. It holds graduate school classes for working people and offers support for lifelong learning and student job placement.

The Tokyo Marunouchi Campus (2007–present) is on the 10th floor of the Sapia Tower, next to Tokyo Station. In addition to serving as an information hub and offering lectures, the campus provides job placement support for alumni in the Tokyo metropolitan area.

== Athletics ==
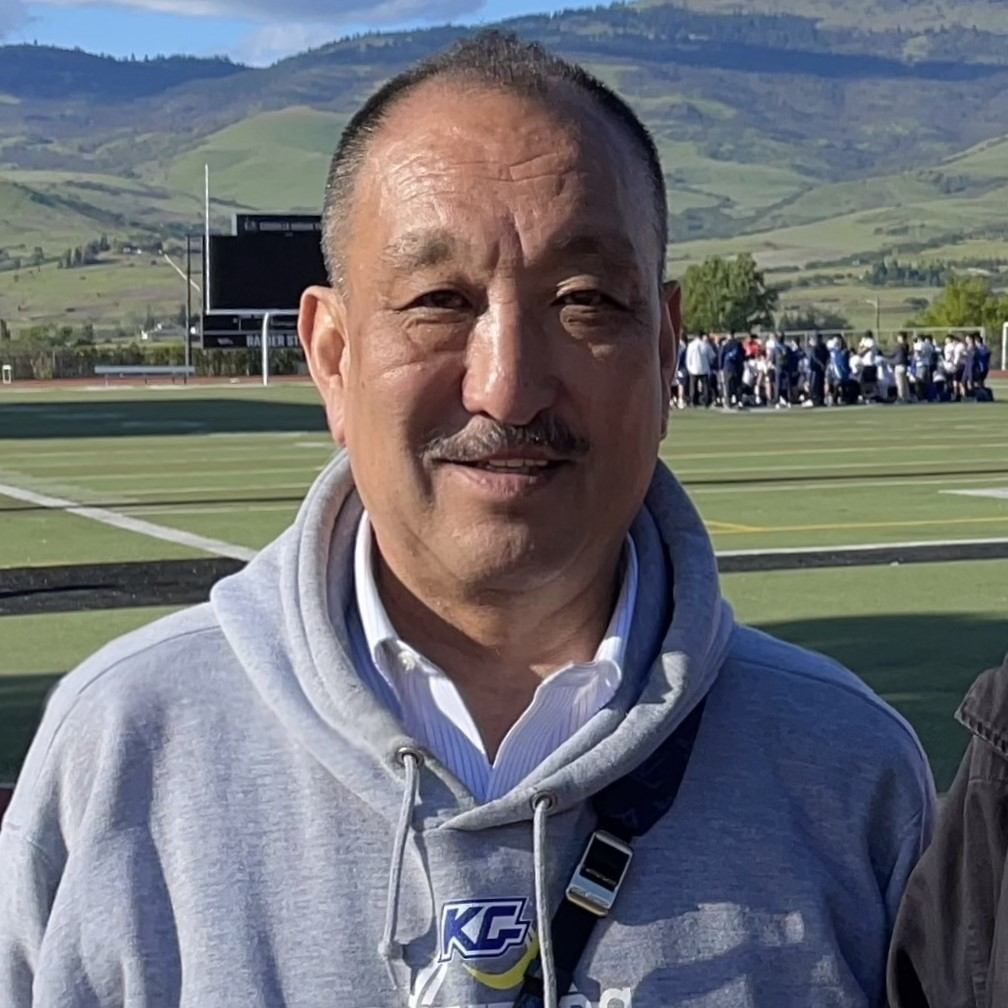
American football head coach Hideaki "Hank" Toriuchi won 12 collegiate national championships in his 27 seasons as head coach of the Fighters (1992–2019).

Kwansei Gakuin has one of Japan's most diverse varsity athletic programs, with 34 varsity teams competing in regional collegiate leagues. Although the school, unlike other private universities in the country, does not offer specific scholarships for student-athletes, it is still competitive with the top echelon of Japanese collegiate teams in the sports of American football, basketball, lacrosse, and soccer.

The Fighters are one of Japan's most decorated American football programs at the university level, with a record 34 national championships.
