= Takashi Hirose (writer) =

Japanese writer (born 1943)

- 広瀬隆
- Born: January 24, 1943 (age 83); Tokyo, Empire of Japan
- Education: Waseda University
- Occupation: Writer
- Relatives: Saburō Hirose (father)
- Writing career
- Period: 1965 –

Takashi Hirose (広瀬 隆, Hirose Takashi; born 24 January 1943) is a Japanese writer. His father was Saburō Hirose, an architect.

== Biography ==
He was born in Tokyo. After graduating from Waseda University, he started writing by translating foreign medical studies. After the Three Mile Island accident in 1979, Hirose wrote several works about the event in the 1980s. In his book, Why John Wayne Died (ジョン・ウェインはなぜ死んだか, Jon Wein wa naze shinda ka), he argues that several outdoor film sets in Nevada in the 1950s were contaminated as a result of nuclear testing. After the Chernobyl disaster, Hirose published A Dangerous Story: Cherynobyl and the Destiny of Japan (危険な話 チェルノブイリと日本の運命, Kiken'na hanashi:cherunobiri to nihon no unmei), in which he makes an argument about the risks of using nuclear energy to generate electricity.

In addition to writing works criticising nuclear power, Hirose wrote several works on the economy of Japan as well as the world economy. In 1986, he published Hollywood Billionaire Kills (億万長者はハリウッドを殺す, Okumanchōja wa Hariuddo o korosu), in which he focused on the Rockefeller and Morgan families. He also published a work focusing on the Rothschild family, Red Shield - Mystery of Rothschild (赤い楯―ロスチャイルドの謎, Akai tate - Rosuchairudo no nazo), in 1991. On Ryūichi Hirokawa's work concerning Judaism, Merchants of Diamonds and Death (ダイヤモンドと死の商人, Daiyamondo to shi no shōnin), Hirose claimed that it revealed several Jewish conspiracies, particularly among Israel, South Africa and Taiwan.

Concerning the Fukushima Daiichi nuclear disaster, Hirose suggested that Chief Cabinet Secretary Yukio Edano repeated the warnings given to him by Tokyo Electric Power Company about the health effects of the disaster. He later wrote several works in which he called for a phase-out of nuclear power. In 2012, a year since the accident, he gave a testimony for Beyond the Cloud, a film by Keiko Courdy concerning the event.

== Selected bibliography ==
- Nuclear Plants in Tokyo! (東京に原発を！, Tōkyō ni genpatsu o!) (1981)
- Why John Wayne Died (ジョン・ウェインはなぜ死んだか, Jon Wein wa naze shinda ka) (1982)
- Hollywood Billionaire Kills (億万長者はハリウッドを殺す, Okumanchōja wa Hariuddo o korosu) (1986)
- A Dangerous Story (危険な話 チェルノブイリと日本の運命, Kiken'na hanashi) (1987)
- Boys of Chernobyl (チェルノブイリの少年たち, Cherunobuiri no shōnen-tachi) (1988)
- The Day That Nuclear Plants Stopped (原発がとまった日, Genpatsu ga tomatta hi) (1989)
- Red Shield - Mystery of Rothschild (赤い楯―ロスチャイルドの謎, Akai tate - Rosuchairudo no nazo) (1991)
- Itsumo tsukiyo to wa kagiranai (いつも月夜とは限らない) (1992)
- Nippon o ugokashita kaibutsu-tachi (日本を動かした怪物たち) (2007)
- Nisankatanso ondan-ka-setsu no hōkai (二酸化炭素温暖化説の崩壊) (2010)
- Genshiro jigen bakudan (原子炉時限爆弾) (2010)

== See also ==
- Anti-nuclear movement
- Nuclear power phase-out
- James Goldsmith
