= 2023 Roasso Kumamoto season =

Roasso Kumamoto
2023 season
- Chairman: Tomoyoshi Ikeya
- Manager: Takeshi Oki
- Stadium: Egao Kenko Stadium
- J2 League: 8th
- Emperor's Cup: Third round
Home colours	Away colours
- All statistics correct as of 11 June 2023.

The 2023 season was Roasso Kumamoto's 54th season in existence and the club's second consecutive season in the second division of Japanese football. In addition to the domestic league, Roasso Kumamoto participated in this season's edition of the Emperor's Cup.

== Players ==
=== Current squad ===
As of 6 January 2023.

Note: Flags indicate national team as defined under FIFA eligibility rules; some limited exceptions apply. Players may hold more than one non-FIFA nationality.

No.	Pos.	Nation	Player
1	GK	JPN	Ryuga Tashiro
2	MF	JPN	Kohei Kuroki
3	MF	JPN	Ryotaro Onishi
4	MF	JPN	Itto Fujita
5	DF	JPN	Kaito Abe
6	DF	JPN	Makoto Okazaki
7	MF	JPN	Keisuke Tanabe
8	MF	JPN	Shuhei Kamimura
9	MF	JPN	Yuki Omoto
10	MF	JPN	Shun Ito
11	FW	JPN	Shohei Aihara
13	GK	JPN	Takuya Masuda
14	MF	JPN	Yuhi Takemoto
15	MF	JPN	Shohei Mishima
16	MF	JPN	Rimu Matsuoka

No.	Pos.	Nation	Player
17	MF	JPN	Rei Hirakawa (captain)
18	FW	JPN	Daiki Ishikawa
19	MF	JPN	Takuya Shimamura
20	FW	JPN	Shun Osaki
21	MF	JPN	Ayumu Toyoda
22	DF	JPN	Yuya Aizawa
23	GK	JPN	Yuya Sato
24	DF	JPN	Takuro Ezaki
25	MF	JPN	Tsubasa Togo
26	DF	JPN	Kaito Miyazaki
27	MF	JPN	Yuto Taniyama
28	FW	JPN	Yusei Toshida
29	FW	JPN	Yutaka Michiwaki
30	MF	JPN	Tatsuki Higashiyama

== Transfers ==
Transfers in
Join on	Pos.	Player	Moving from	Transfer type
Pre-season	DF	(Japan) Makoto Okazaki	(Japan) FC Tokyo	Full transfer
Pre-season	DF	(Japan) Yuya Aizawa	(Japan) Komazawa University	Free transfer
Pre-season	DF	(Japan) Kaito Miyazaki	(Japan) NIFS Kanoya	Full transfer
Pre-season	MF	(Japan) Takuya Shimamura	(Japan) FC Imabari	Free transfer
Pre-season	MF	(Japan) Ryotaro Onishi	(Japan) FC Gifu	Full transfer
Pre-season	MF	(Japan) Yuki Omoto	(Japan) FC Ryukyu	Full transfer
Pre-season	MF	(Japan) Tsubasa Togo	(Japan) Nippon SS University	Free transfer
Pre-season	MF	(Japan) Ayumu Toyoda	(Japan) Chuo University	Free transfer
Pre-season	FW	(Japan) Rimu Matsuoka	(Japan) Tochigi SC	Full transfer
Pre-season	FW	(Japan) Daichi Ishikawa	(Japan) Gainare Tottori	Full transfer
Pre-season	FW	(Japan) Shun Osaki	(Japan) Fukuoka University	Free transfer
Pre-season	FW	(Japan) Yutaka Michiwaki	(Japan) Roasso Kumamoto U18s	Promotion

Transfers out
Leave on	Pos.	Player	Moving to	Transfer type
Pre-season	DF	(Japan) So Kawahara	(Japan) Sagan Tosu	Full transfer
Pre-season	DF	(Japan) Koki Sakamoto	(Japan) Yokohama FC	Full transfer
Pre-season	DF	(Japan) Masahiro Sugata	(Japan) Vegalta Sendai	Full transfer
Pre-season	DF	(Japan) Shuichi Sakai	(Japan) Thespakusatsu Gunma	Full transfer
Pre-season	DF	(Japan) Osamu Henry Iyoha	(Japan) Sanfrecce Hiroshima	Loan expiration
Pre-season	DF	(Japan) Kotaro Higashino	(Japan) J-Lease FC	Free transfer
Pre-season	DF	(Brazil) Leo Kenta	–	Contract expiration
Pre-season	MF	(Japan) Naohiro Sugiyama	(Japan) Gamba Osaka	Full transfer
Pre-season	MF	(Japan) Sota Higashide	(Japan) Tegevajaro Miyazaki	FFree transfer
Pre-season	MF	(Japan) Kosei Tajiri	(Japan) Kochi United	Free transfer
Pre-season	MF	(Japan) Keitatsu Kojima	(Japan) Ococias Kyoto	Free transfer
Pre-season	MF	(Brazil) Thales Paula	(Japan) Nagoya Grampus	Loan expiration
Pre-season	MF	(Japan) Keitatsu Kojima	–	Contract expiration
Pre-season	FW	(Japan) Toshiki Takahashi	(Japan) Urawa Red Diamonds	Full transfer
Pre-season	FW	(Japan) Kakeru Higuchi	(Japan) Kochi United	Free transfer

== Competitions ==
=== Overview ===
Competition	First match	Last match	Starting round	Record							
Competition	First match	Last match	Starting round	Pld	W	D	L	GF	GA	GD	Win %
J2 League	19 February 2023	12 November 2023	Matchday 1	21	8	6	7	31	21	+10	38.10
Emperor's Cup	21 June 2023		Second round	1	0	1	0	2	2	+0	0.00
Total				22	8	7	7	33	23	+10	36.36

Last updated: 21 June 2023
Source: Soccerway

=== J2 League ===
==== League table ====
Pos	Team	Pld	W	D	L	GF	GA	GD	Pts
12	Fujieda MYFC	42	14	10	18	61	72	−11	52
13	Blaublitz Akita	42	12	15	15	37	44	−7	51
14	Roasso Kumamoto	42	13	10	19	52	53	−1	49
15	Tokushima Vortis	42	10	19	13	43	53	−10	49
16	Vegalta Sendai	42	12	12	18	48	61	−13	48

Source: Meiji Yasuda J2 League, J.League Data Site
Rules for classification: 1) Points; 2) Goal difference; 3) Goals scored; 4) Head-to-head points; 5) Head-to-head goal difference; 6) Head-to-head goal scored; 7) Fair-play points.

==== Results summary ====
Overall								Home						Away					
Pld	W	D	L	GF	GA	GD	Pts	W	D	L	GF	GA	GD	W	D	L	GF	GA	GD
20	7	6	7	27	21	+6	27	4	2	5	13	12	+1	3	4	2	14	9	+5

Last updated: 11 June 2023.
Source: Worldfootball

==== Results by round ====
Round	1	2	3	4	5	6	7	8	9	10	11	12	13	14	15	16	17	18	19	20	21	22
Ground	A	H	H	A	H	A	H	H	A	A	H	A	H	H	A	H	A	H	A	H	A	
Result	D	L	W	W	L	L	D	W	D	D	D	L	W	W	D	L	W	L	W	L	W	
Position	8	18	9	5	8	13	14	11	12	13	13	14	13	11	11	12						

Updated to match(es) played on 17 June 2023. Source: Worldfootball
A = Away; H = Home; W = Win; D = Draw; L = Loss

==== Matches ====
The league fixtures were announced on 20 January 2023.

19 February 1	Tochigi SC	1–1	Roasso Kumamoto	Utsunomiya
16:00		Report		Stadium: Tochigi Green Stadium

26 February 2	Roasso Kumamoto	0–1	Blaublitz Akita	Kumamoto
13:00		Report		Stadium: Egao Kenko Stadium

5 March 3	Roasso Kumamoto	3–0	Omiya Ardija	Kumamoto
13:00		Report		Stadium: Egao Kenko Stadium

11 March 4	Renofa Yamaguchi	1–3	Roasso Kumamoto	Yamaguchi
14:00		Report		Stadium: Ishin Me-Life Stadium

19 March 5	Roasso Kumamoto	0–2	V-Varen Nagasaki	Kumamoto
14:00		Report		Stadium: Egao Kenko Stadium

25 March 6	Tokyo Verdy	3–0	Roasso Kumamoto	Tokyo
15:00	Fukazawa 16'; Taira 73'; Yamakoshi 82'	Report		Stadium: Ajinomoto Stadium; Attendance: 4,587; Referee: Tom Nield (England)

2 April 2023 7	Roasso Kumamoto	1–1	Tokushima Vortis	Kumamoto
12:00	Hirakawa 54'	Report	Kodama 56'	Stadium: Egao Kenko Stadium; Attendance: 4,166; Referee: Keisuke Nobori

9 April 8	Roasso Kumamoto	3–1	Zweigen Kanazawa	Kumamoto
15:00	Ishikawa 42'; Ezaki 60'; Kajiura 62'	Report	Kato 45'	Stadium: Egao Kenko Stadium; Attendance: 5,315; Referee: Shuhei Shimizu

12 April 9	Fagiano Okayama	0–0	Roasso Kumamoto	Okayama
19:00		Report		Stadium: City Light Stadium

16 April 10	Júbilo Iwata	1–1	Roasso Kumamoto	Iwata
16:00	Nakagawa (yellow card) 27'; Kaneko 53'	Report	Matsuoka 12'; Aizawa (yellow card) 15'; Tashiro (yellow card) 36'; Ezaki (yellow card) 88'	Stadium: Yamaha Stadium; Attendance: 7,780; Referee: Keigo Sendachi

21 April 11	Roasso Kumamoto	2–2	JEF United Chiba	Kumamoto
19:00	Tashiro (yellow card) 52'; Ezaki 70'; Aihara (yellow card) 88', (goal) 90+9' (pen.)	Report	Buwanika (yellow card) 28'; Nishikubo 40'; Tsubaki 61'; Goya (yellow card) 85'	Stadium: Egao Kenko Stadium; Attendance: 3,339; Referee: Reo Tanaka

29 April 12	Machida Zelvia	2–1	Roasso Kumamoto	Machida
14:00	Okuyama 8'; Erik 63' (pen.); Fujio (yellow card) 71'	Report	Ishikawa 88'	Stadium: Machida GION Stadium; Attendance: 4,020; Referee: Atsushi Kamimura

3 May 13	Roasso Kumamoto	2–0	Thespakusatsu Gunma	Kumamoto
13:50	Kamimura (yellow card) 30'; Hirakawa 44'; Aihara 90+2'	Report		Stadium: Egao Kenko Stadium; Attendance: 4,193; Referee: Hajime Matsuo

7 May 14	Roasso Kumamoto	2–0	Ventforet Kofu	Kumamoto
13:00	Ishikawa 35', 87'; Aihara (yellow card) 79' (yellow-red card) 84'; Tashiro (yellow card) 90+4'	Report	Kobayashi (yellow card) 53'	Stadium: Egao Kenko Stadium; Attendance: 3,900; Referee: Yosuke Kubota

13 May 15	Oita Trinita	1–1	Roasso Kumamoto	Oita
15:00	Nakagawa 57'	Report	Ishikawa 12'	Stadium: Resonac Dome Oita; Attendance: 12,096; Referee: Hirokazu Otsubo

17 May 16	Roasso Kumamoto	0–1	Vegalta Sendai	Kumamoto
19:00	Matsuoka (yellow card) 15'; Tashiro (yellow card) 90+3'	Report	Sagara 47'; Heo Yong-joon (yellow card) 90+4'	Stadium: Egao Kenko Stadium; Attendance: 2,884; Referee: Koji Takasaki

21 May 17	Mito HollyHock	0–3	Roasso Kumamoto	Mito
15:00		Report		Stadium: K's denki Stadium Mito

28 May 18	Roasso Kumamoto	0–3	Montedio Yamagata	Kumamoto
14:00		Report		Stadium: Egao Kenko Stadium

3 June 19	Iwaki FC	0–4	Roasso Kumamoto	Iwaki
13:00		Report	Aihara 16'; Onishi 22'; Omoto 58'; Hirakawa 62'	Stadium: Iwaki Green Field

11 June 20	Roasso Kumamoto	0–1	Shimizu S-Pulse	Kumamoto
19:00		Report		Stadium: Egao Kenko Stadium

17 June 21	Fujieda MYFC	0–4	Roasso Kumamoto	Fujieda
14:00		Report		Stadium: Fujieda Soccer Stadium

25 June 22	Roasso Kumamoto	v	Júbilo Iwata	Kumamoto
19:00		Report		Stadium: Egao Kenko Stadium

=== Emperor's Cup ===
21 June Second round	Roasso Kumamoto	2–2 (5–4 p)	FC Ryukyu	Kumamoto
19:00 JST (UTC+9)	Higashiyama 49'; Omoto 53'		Kanazaki 25'; Iwamoto 38'	Stadium: Egao Kenko Stadium
	Penalties
	Higashiyama (penalty scored); Toshida (penalty scored); Tashiro (penalty scored); Tanabe (penalty scored); Hirakawa (penalty scored)		(penalty missed) Yanagi; (penalty scored) Kagiyama; (penalty scored) Mori; (penalty scored) Uehara; (penalty scored) Sulley
