= Kazuki Ganaha =

Japanese footballer

Kazuki Ganaha 我那覇 和樹
Personal information
- Full name: Kazuki Ganaha
- Date of birth: September 26, 1980 (age 46)
- Place of birth: Naha, Okinawa, Japan
- Height: 1.81 m (5 ft 11 1/2 in)
- Position: Forward

Team information
- Current team: Okinawa SV
- Number: 9

Youth career
- 1996–1998: Ginowan High School

Senior career*
| Years | Team | Apps | (Gls) |
| 1999–2008 | Kawasaki Frontale | 246 | (69) |
| 2009–2010 | Vissel Kobe | 19 | (0) |
| 2011–2013 | FC Ryukyu | 88 | (31) |
| 2014–2023 | Kamatamare Sanuki | 105 | (12) |
| 2023- | J-Lease FC | 0 | (0) |
| Total | | 458 | (112) |

International career
| 2006 | Japan | 6 | (3) |
Medal record
Kawasaki Frontale
| Runner-up | J1 League | 2006 |
| Runner-up | J1 League | 2008 |
| Runner-up | J.League Cup | 2000 |
| Runner-up | J.League Cup | 2007 |
- * Club domestic league appearances and goals as of end of 2018 season

Kazuki Ganaha (我那覇 和樹, Ganaha Kazuki; born September 26, 1980) is a Japanese football player who plays for Okinawa SV .

== Club career ==
After graduating Ginowan High School in 1999, he joined J2 League side Kawasaki Frontale. He made his professional debut on May 2, 1999, against Vegalta Sendai. His first professional goal came on May 13, 2000, against Nagoya Grampus Eight. Frontale won the champions in 1999 season and was promoted to J1 League. However the club finished in bottom place in J1 in 2000 season and was relegated to J2 the following year. In 2003, he became a regular forward. In 2004, he scored 22 goals and he was the 2nd top J2 League scorer. He helped lead Frontale to the J2 League championship and Frontale was promoted to J1. In 2006, he scored 18 goals and he was the 3rd top J1 League scorer. Frontale also finished at the 2nd place in 2006 season. However his opportunity to play decreased from 2007 season.

During the 2007 season, Ganaha was suspended for six games due to alleged infringement of the anti-doping code by intravenous therapy with saline solution and vitamin B1, due to dehydration and inability to take fluids orally. Ganaha appealed the case to the Court of Arbitration for Sport (CAS) in December 2007, and on May 26, 2008, CAS issued a ruling supporting him and to have the six game suspension reversed.

Ganaha transferred to Vissel Kobe in 2009. Although he played for 2 seasons, he could not play many matches and he could only scored a goal in 2009 J.League Cup.

In 2011, Ganaha moved to Japan Football League club FC Ryukyu based in his local Okinawa Prefecture. He played as forward and scored many goals. The club was also promoted to new league J3 League from 2014.

In January 2014, Ganaha moved to newly promoted J2 club Kamatamare Sanuki, without playing for FC Ryukyu in J3. Although the club results was sluggish, he played many matches until 2016. However his opportunity to play decreased and the club finished at the bottom place in 2018 season and was relegated to J3.

== National team career ==
Ganaha made his senior national team debut on August 9, 2006, in a friendly against Trinidad and Tobago, the first match under the reign of new national coach Ivica Osim. He is the first Okinawa-born footballer to play for the Japan national team. His first international goal was an injury time winner in a 2007 Asian Cup qualifier against Yemen, held on September 6, 2006, in Sanaa, Yemen. He also scored 2 goals in another qualifier against Saudi Arabia. He played 6 games and scored 3 goals for Japan in 2006.

== Club statistics ==
As of end of 2018 season

| Club performance | | | League | | Cup | | League Cup | | Continental | | Total | |
| Season | Club | League | Apps | Goals | Apps | Goals | Apps | Goals | Apps | Goals | Apps | Goals |
| Japan | | | League | | Emperor's Cup | | J.League Cup | | AFC | | Total | |
|---|---|---|---|---|---|---|---|---|---|---|---|---|
| 1999 | Kawasaki Frontale | J2 League | 3 | 0 | 3 | 2 | 0 | 0 | - | | 6 | 2 |
| 2000 | Kawasaki Frontale | J1 League | 18 | 2 | 1 | 0 | 7 | 2 | - | | 26 | 4 |
| 2001 | Kawasaki Frontale | J2 League | 31 | 2 | 5 | 1 | 3 | 1 | - | | 39 | 4 |
| 2002 | Kawasaki Frontale | J2 League | 21 | 3 | 5 | 4 | - | | - | | 26 | 7 |
| 2003 | Kawasaki Frontale | J2 League | 40 | 13 | 4 | 4 | - | | - | | 44 | 17 |
| 2004 | Kawasaki Frontale | J2 League | 42 | 22 | 3 | 2 | - | | - | | 45 | 24 |
| 2005 | Kawasaki Frontale | J1 League | 26 | 6 | 3 | 2 | 2 | 0 | - | | 31 | 8 |
| 2006 | Kawasaki Frontale | J1 League | 32 | 18 | 1 | 0 | 9 | 3 | - | | 42 | 21 |
| 2007 | Kawasaki Frontale | J1 League | 18 | 1 | 1 | 0 | 1 | 0 | 5 | 0 | 25 | 1 |
| 2008 | Kawasaki Frontale | J1 League | 15 | 2 | 2 | 0 | 5 | 2 | - | | 22 | 4 |
| Total | | | 246 | 69 | 28 | 15 | 27 | 8 | 5 | 0 | 306 | 92 |
| 2009 | Vissel Kobe | J1 League | 11 | 0 | 1 | 0 | 3 | 1 | - | | 15 | 1 |
| 2010 | Vissel Kobe | J1 League | 8 | 0 | 1 | 0 | 0 | 0 | - | | 9 | 0 |
| Total | | | 19 | 0 | 2 | 0 | 3 | 1 | - | | 24 | 1 |
| 2011 | FC Ryukyu | Football League | 27 | 6 | 1 | 0 | - | | - | | 28 | 6 |
| 2012 | FC Ryukyu | Football League | 28 | 13 | 0 | 0 | - | | - | | 28 | 13 |
| 2013 | FC Ryukyu | Football League | 33 | 12 | 2 | 0 | - | | - | | 35 | 12 |
| Total | | | 88 | 31 | 3 | 0 | - | | - | | 91 | 31 |
| 2014 | Kamatamare Sanuki | J2 League | 26 | 3 | 1 | 0 | - | | - | | 27 | 3 |
| 2015 | Kamatamare Sanuki | J2 League | 31 | 5 | 1 | 0 | - | | - | | 32 | 5 |
| 2016 | Kamatamare Sanuki | J2 League | 24 | 1 | 1 | 0 | - | | - | | 25 | 1 |
| 2017 | Kamatamare Sanuki | J2 League | 12 | 2 | 0 | 0 | - | | - | | 12 | 2 |
| 2018 | Kamatamare Sanuki | J2 League | 12 | 1 | 1 | 0 | - | | - | | 13 | 1 |
| 2019 | Kamatamare Sanuki | J3 League | | | | | - | | - | | | |
| Total | | | 105 | 12 | 4 | 0 | - | | - | | 109 | 12 |
| Career total | | | 458 | 112 | 37 | 15 | 30 | 9 | 5 | 0 | 530 | 136 |

== National team statistics ==
Japan national team
| Year | Apps | Goals |
|---|---|---|
| 2006 | 6 | 3 |
| Total | 6 | 3 |

== National team career statistics ==
=== Appearances in major competitions ===
| Year | Competition | Category | Appearances | | Goals | Team Record |
| Year | Competition | Category | Start | Sub | Goals | Team Record |
|---|---|---|---|---|---|---|
| 2006 | 2007 AFC Asian Cup qualification | Senior | 1 | 3 | 3 | Qualified |

=== Goals for senior national team ===
| # | Date | Venue | Opponent | Score | Result | Competition |
|---|---|---|---|---|---|---|
| 1. | 2006-09-06 | Althawra Sports City Stadium, Sanaa, Yemen | Yemen | 1-0 | Won | 2007 AFC Asian Cup qualification |
| 2. | 2006-11-15 | Sapporo Dome, Sapporo, Japan | Saudi Arabia | 3-1 | Won | 2007 AFC Asian Cup qualification |
| 3. | 2006-11-15 | Sapporo Dome, Sapporo, Japan | Saudi Arabia | 3-1 | Won | 2007 AFC Asian Cup qualification |
