= Shohei Yamamoto =

Japanese footballer

Shohei Yamamoto 山本 翔平
Personal information
- Full name: Shohei Yamamoto
- Date of birth: August 29, 1982 (age 44)
- Place of birth: Nagaokakyo, Kyoto, Japan
- Height: 1.73 m (5 ft 8 in)
- Position: Midfielder

Youth career
- 1995–2000: Kyoto Purple Sanga

Senior career*
Years	Team	Apps	(Gls)
2001	Kyoto Purple Sanga	0	(0)
2002–2003	Mito HollyHock	27	(0)
2004–2006	ALO's Hokuriku	76	(5)
2007–2009	Roasso Kumamoto	84	(1)
2010–2012	V-Varen Nagasaki	53	(0)
2013–2017	Kamatamare Sanuki	140	(3)
2018	Ococias Kyoto AC	3	(0)
Total		383	(9)
- * Club domestic league appearances and goals

Shohei Yamamoto (山本 翔平, Yamamoto Shōhei; born August 29, 1982) is a former Japanese football player.

== Playing career ==
Yamamoto was born in Nagaokakyo on August 29, 1982. He joined J2 League club Kyoto Purple Sanga from youth team in 2001. However he could not play at all in the match. In 2002, he moved to J2 club Mito HollyHock. Although he played many matches in 2002 season, he could hardly play in the match in 2003 season. In 2004, he moved to Japan Football League (JFL) club ALO's Hokuriku. He played many matches as regular player in 3 seasons. In 2007, he moved to JFL club Rosso Kumamoto (later Roasso Kumamoto). Although he could hardly play in the match, the club was promoted to J2 end of 2007 season. He became a regular player in 2008 and played many matches in 2 seasons. In 2010, he moved to JFL club V-Varen Nagasaki. Although he played many matches as regular player in 2010, his opportunity to play decreased from 2012. In 2013, he moved to JFL club Kamatamare Sanuki. He became a regular player soon and the club was promoted to J2 end of 2013 season. Although he played many matches until 2016, his opportunity to play decreased in 2017. In 2018, he moved to Regional Leagues club Ococias Kyoto AC. He retired end of 2018 season.

== Club statistics ==
Club performance			League		Cup		League Cup		Total	
Season	Club	League	Apps	Goals	Apps	Goals	Apps	Goals	Apps	Goals
Japan			League		Emperor's Cup		J.League Cup		Total	
2001	Kyoto Purple Sanga	J2 League	0	0	0	0	0	0	0	0
Total			0	0	0	0	0	0	0	0
2002	Mito HollyHock	J2 League	25	0	1	0	-		26	0
2003	Mito HollyHock	J2 League	2	0	0	0	-		2	0
Total			27	0	1	0	-		28	0
2004	ALO's Hokuriku	Football League	27	0	2	0	-		29	0
2005	ALO's Hokuriku	Football League	28	3	2	0	-		30	3
2006	ALO's Hokuriku	Football League	21	2	-		-		21	2
Total			76	5	4	0	-		80	5
2007	Rosso Kumamoto	Football League	3	0	0	0	-		3	0
2008	Roasso Kumamoto	J2 League	37	0	1	0	-		38	0
2009	Roasso Kumamoto	J2 League	44	1	1	0	-		45	1
Total			84	1	2	0	-		86	1
2010	V-Varen Nagasaki	Football League	31	0	1	0	-		32	0
2011	V-Varen Nagasaki	Football League	11	0	1	0	-		12	0
2012	V-Varen Nagasaki	Football League	11	0	2	0	-		13	0
Total			53	0	4	0	-		57	0
2013	Kamatamare Sanuki	Football League	31	3	1	0	-		32	3
2014	Kamatamare Sanuki	J2 League	34	0	0	0	-		34	0
2015	Kamatamare Sanuki	J2 League	29	0	1	0	-		30	0
2016	Kamatamare Sanuki	J2 League	29	0	2	0	-		31	0
2017	Kamatamare Sanuki	J2 League	17	0	0	0	-		17	0
Total			140	3	4	0	-		144	3
2018	Ococias Kyoto AC	Regional Leagues	3	0	0	0	-		3	0
Total			3	0	0	0	-		3	0
Career total			383	9	15	0	0	0	398	9
