= Ryosuke Kijima =

Japanese footballer

Ryosuke Kijima 木島 良輔
Personal information
- Full name: Ryosuke Kijima
- Date of birth: 29 May 1979 (age 47)
- Place of birth: Mobara, Chiba, Japan
- Height: 1.67 m (5 ft 5 1/2 in)
- Position: Forward

Youth career
- 1995–1997: Teikyo High School

Senior career*
Years	Team	Apps	(Gls)
1998–2002	Yokohama F. Marinos	32	(0)
1999	→ Defensores Belgrano (loan)	0	(0)
2002–2005	Oita Trinita	47	(3)
2006–2007	Tokyo Verdy	0	(0)
2008–2009	Roasso Kumamoto	74	(17)
2010	Machida Zelvia	31	(16)
2011–2012	Matsumoto Yamaga FC	31	(6)
2012	Tokyo Verdy	9	(0)
2013–2017	Kamatamare Sanuki	109	(26)
2018	FC Maruyasu Okazaki	15	(1)
2019	Kamatamare Sanuki	10	(0)
Total		358	(69)
Medal record
Yokohama F. Marinos
Runner-up	J1 League	2000
Runner-up	J1 League	2002
Winner	J.League Cup	2001
- * Club domestic league appearances and goals as of 1 January 2020

Ryosuke Kijima (木島 良輔, Kijima Ryosuke; born 29 May 1979) is a Japanese former football player. His younger brother Tetsuya is also a footballer.

== Playing career ==
Kijima was born in Mobara on 29 May 1979. After graduating from high school, he joined J1 League club Yokohama Marinos in 1998. On 7 November, he debuted against Nagoya Grampus Eight. However he could hardly play in the match until 1999. He also moved to Argentine club Defensores Belgrano in 1999. From late 2000, he played many matches as left side midfielder and forward. In September 2002, he moved to J2 League club Oita Trinita. He played many matches as substitute forward and the club won the champions in 2002 and was promoted to J1 from 2003. However he was released from the club end of 2002 season. After 9 months blank, he joined Oita Trinita again in October 2003. In 2006, he move to J2 club Tokyo Verdy. However he could not play at all in the match for injuries and left the club end of 2006 season. After 7 months blank, he joined Tokyo Verdy again in August 2007. However he could not play at all in the match. In 2008, he moved to newly was promoted to J2 League club, Roasso Kumamoto.

He played many matches and scored 17 goals in 2 seasons. In 2010, he moved to Japan Football League (JFL) club FC Machida Zelvia. He played as regular player and scored 16 goals. In 2011, he moved to JFL club Matsumoto Yamaga FC. He played many matches with his younger brother Tetsuya and the club was promoted to J2 from 2012. In August 2012, he moved to Tokyo Verdy. In 2013, he moved to JFL club Kamatamare Sanuki. He played as regular player and the club was promoted to J2 from 2014. His brother Tetsuya also joined the club in 2015 and played together until end of 2017 season. In 2018, he moved to JFL club Maruyasu Okazaki. After one season at Maruyasu Okazaki, Kijima re-joined newly was relegated to J3 League club, Kamatamare Sanuki. He retired in December 2019.

== Club statistics ==
As of 1 January 2020.

Club performance			League		Cup		League Cup		Total	
Season	Club	League	Apps	Goals	Apps	Goals	Apps	Goals	Apps	Goals
Japan			League		Emperor's Cup		J.League Cup		Total	
1998	Yokohama Marinos	J1 League	2	0	0	0	0	0	2	0
1999	Yokohama F. Marinos	J1 League	2	0	2	0	0	0	4	0
2000	Yokohama F. Marinos	J1 League	5	0	3	1	0	0	8	1
2001	Yokohama F. Marinos	J1 League	20	0	1	0	7	0	28	0
2002	Yokohama F. Marinos	J1 League	3	0	0	0	5	1	8	1
Total			32	0	6	1	12	1	50	2
2002	Oita Trinita	J2 League	15	0	1	0	-		16	0
2003	Oita Trinita	J1 League	4	0	1	0	0	0	5	0
2004	Oita Trinita	J1 League	18	3	1	0	2	1	21	4
2005	Oita Trinita	J1 League	10	0	1	0	4	0	15	0
Total			47	3	4	0	6	1	57	4
2006	Tokyo Verdy	J2 League	0	0	0	0	-		0	0
2007	Tokyo Verdy	J2 League	0	0	0	0	-		0	0
Total			0	0	0	0	-		0	0
2008	Roasso Kumamoto	J2 League	29	7	1	0	-		30	7
2009	Roasso Kumamoto	J2 League	45	10	1	0	-		46	10
Total			74	17	2	0	-		76	17
2010	Machida Zelvia	JFL	31	16	2	0	-		33	16
Total			31	16	2	0	-		33	16
2011	Matsumoto Yamaga	JFL	25	6	4	2	-		29	8
2012	Matsumoto Yamaga	J2 League	6	0	0	0	-		6	0
Total			31	6	4	2	-		35	8
2012	Tokyo Verdy	J2 League	9	0	1	0	-		10	0
Total			9	0	1	0	-		10	0
2013	Kamatamare Sanuki	JFL	32	15	1	0	-		33	15
2014	Kamatamare Sanuki	J2 League	21	6	1	0	-		22	6
2015	Kamatamare Sanuki	J2 League	32	3	2	0	-		34	3
2016	Kamatamare Sanuki	J2 League	14	2	0	0	-		14	2
2017	Kamatamare Sanuki	J2 League	10	0	0	0	-		10	0
Total			109	26	4	0	-		113	26
2018	Maruyasu Okazaki	JFL	15	1	0	0	-		15	1
Total			15	1	0	0	-		15	1
2019	Kamatamare Sanuki	J3 League	10	0	2	0	-		12	0
Total			10	0	2	0	-		12	0
Total			358	69	25	3	18	2	401	74
