= Tomoya Osawa (footballer, born 1984) =

Japanese footballer

Tomoya Osawa 大沢 朋也
Personal information
- Full name: Tomoya Osawa
- Date of birth: October 22, 1984 (age 42)
- Place of birth: Sayama, Saitama, Japan
- Height: 1.63 m (5 ft 4 in)
- Position: Midfielder

Youth career
- 2000–2002: Teikyo High School

Senior career*
Years	Team	Apps	(Gls)
2003–2005	Omiya Ardija	1	(0)
2006–2012	Sagawa Shiga	174	(23)
2013–2017	Kamatamare Sanuki	65	(3)
Total		240	(26)

International career
2001	Japan U-17	1	(0)
- * Club domestic league appearances and goals

Tomoya Osawa (大沢 朋也, Osawa Tomoya; born October 22, 1984) is a former Japanese football player.

== Club career ==
Osawa was born in Sayama on October 22, 1984. After graduating from high school, he joined Omiya Ardija in 2003. However he could hardly play in the match and he moved to Japan Football League club Sagawa Express Tokyo (later Sagawa Shiga) in 2006. He played many matches from first season and became a regular player from 2008 season. However the club was disbanded end of 2012 season, he moved to Kamatamare Sanuki in 2013. He played as regular player and the club was promoted to J2 League end of 2013 season. However his opportunity to play decreased from 2014 and he retired end of 2017 season.

== National team career ==
In September 2001, he was selected Japan U-17 national team for 2001 U-17 World Championship. He played 1 match against France as substitutes.

== Club statistics ==
Club performance			League		Cup		League Cup		Other		Total	
Season	Club	League	Apps	Goals	Apps	Goals	Apps	Goals	Apps	Goals	Apps	Goals
Japan			League		Emperor's Cup		J.League Cup		Other^{1}		Total	
2003	Omiya Ardija	J2 League	1	0	0	0	-		-		1	0
2004	Omiya Ardija	J2 League	0	0	0	0	-		-		0	0
2005	Omiya Ardija	J1 League	0	0	0	0	0	0	-		0	0
2006	Sagawa Express Tokyo	Football League	22	2	-		-		-		22	2
2007	Sagawa Express	Football League	8	0	0	0	-		-		8	0
2008	Sagawa Shiga	Football League	30	4	1	0	-		-		31	4
2009	Sagawa Shiga	Football League	34	10	1	0	-		-		35	10
2010	Sagawa Shiga	Football League	28	1	1	0	-		-		29	1
2011	Sagawa Shiga	Football League	29	4	1	0	-		-		30	4
2012	Sagawa Shiga	Football League	23	2	3	0	-		-		26	2
2013	Kamatamare Sanuki	Football League	30	3	2	0	-		-		32	3
2014	Kamatamare Sanuki	J2 League	17	0	1	0	-		1	0	19	0
2015	Kamatamare Sanuki	J2 League	6	0	0	0	-		-		6	0
2016	Kamatamare Sanuki	J2 League	8	0	0	0	-		-		8	0
2017	Kamatamare Sanuki	J2 League	4	0	0	0	-		-		4	0
Total			240	26	10	0	0	0	1	0	251	26

^{1}Includes J3 Relegation Playoffs.
