= Shōhei (given name) =

- Gender: Male

Origin
- Origin: Japanese
- Meaning: Different meanings depending on the kanji used

Shōhei, Shohei, or Shouhei (written as: 昌平, 昇平, 翔平, 祥平, 祥兵, 正平, 宗平, 将平, 頌平, 章平, 勝平 or 尚平) is a masculine Japanese given name. Notable people with the name include:

- Shohei Abe (阿部 翔平; born 1983), Japanese footballer
- Shohei Aihara (粟飯原 尚平; born 1996), Japanese footballer
- Shohei Baba (馬場 正平; best known by his ring name Giant Baba, 1938–1999), Japanese professional wrestler
- Shohei Harumoto (東本 昌平), Japanese manga artist
- Shohei Ikeda (池田 昇平; born 1981), Japanese footballer
- Shōhei Imamura (今村 昌平; 1926–2006), Japanese film director
- Shohei Iwamoto (岩元 勝平; born 1989), Japanese modern pentathlete
- Shohei Kaneko (金子 宗平; 1937–2006), Japanese discus thrower
- Shohei Kasahara (笠原 章平; born 1939), Japanese hammer thrower
- Shohei Kato (加藤 翔平; born 1991), Japanese baseball player
- Shohei Kishida (岸田 翔平; born 1990), Japanese footballer
- Shohei Matsunaga (松永 祥兵; born 1989), Japanese footballer
- Shohei Mishima (三島 頌平; born 1995), Japanese footballer
- Shohei Miura (三浦 翔平; born 1988), Japanese actor and model
- Shohei Moriyasu (森保 翔平; born 1991), Japanese footballer
- Shōhei Ogura (小椋 祥平; born 1985), Japanese footballer
- Shohei Okada (岡田 翔平; born 1989), Japanese footballer
- Shohei Okuno (奥野 将平; born 1990), Japanese footballer
- Shōhei Ōoka (大岡 昇平; 1909–1988), Japanese writer, literary critic, and translator
- Shohei Ohtani (大谷 翔平; born 1994), Japanese baseball player
- Shohei Otomo (born 1980), Japanese artist
- Shohei Otsuka (大塚 翔平; born 1990), Japanese footballer
- Shohei Suzuki (鈴木 正平), Japanese astronomer
- Shōhei Takada (高田 尚平; born 1962), Japanese shogi player
- Shohei Takahashi (高橋 祥平; born 1991), Japanese footballer
- Shohei Takashima (高島 祥平; born 1990), Japanese baseball player
- Shohei Tateyama (館山 昌平; born 1981), Japanese baseball player
- Shōhei Tochimoto (栃本 翔平; born 1989), Japanese ski jumper
- Shohei Yamamoto (山本 翔平; born 1982), Japanese footballer
- Shohei Yokoyama (横山 翔平; born 1993), Japanese footballer
