= 2018 Kamatamare Sanuki season =

Kamatamare Sanuki
2018 season
- Manager: Makoto Kitano
- Stadium: Pikara Stadium
- J2 League: 22nd ▼ Relegated

2018 Kamatamare Sanuki season.

== J2 League ==
Match	Date	Team	Score	Team	Venue	Attendance
1	2018.02.25	Kamatamare Sanuki	0-1	Albirex Niigata	Pikara Stadium	4,539
2	2018.03.04	Zweigen Kanazawa	0-1	Kamatamare Sanuki	Ishikawa Athletics Stadium	4,804
3	2018.03.11	Kamatamare Sanuki	1-2	Mito HollyHock	Pikara Stadium	2,693
4	2018.03.17	Tochigi SC	1-0	Kamatamare Sanuki	Tochigi Green Stadium	3,203
5	2018.03.21	JEF United Chiba	6-1	Kamatamare Sanuki	Fukuda Denshi Arena	6,152
6	2018.03.25	Kamatamare Sanuki	1-2	Oita Trinita	Pikara Stadium	2,770
7	2018.03.31	Kyoto Sanga FC	1-1	Kamatamare Sanuki	Kyoto Nishikyogoku Athletic Stadium	5,063
8	2018.04.08	Matsumoto Yamaga	1-1	Kamatamare Sanuki	Matsumotodaira Park Stadium	12,110
9	2018.04.15	Kamatamare Sanuki	1-1	Ehime FC	Pikara Stadium	3,004
10	2018.04.22	Tokushima Vortis	0-1	Kamatamare Sanuki	Pocarisweat Stadium	6,017
11	2018.04.28	Kamatamare Sanuki	1-1	Avispa Fukuoka	Pikara Stadium	2,745
12	2018.05.03	Kamatamare Sanuki	1-2	Yokohama FC	Pikara Stadium	4,295
13	2018.05.06	Montedio Yamagata	2-0	Kamatamare Sanuki	ND Soft Stadium Yamagata	7,512
14	2018.05.13	FC Machida Zelvia	3-0	Kamatamare Sanuki	Machida Stadium	2,414
15	2018.05.20	Kamatamare Sanuki	0-3	Ventforet Kofu	Pikara Stadium	2,259
16	2018.05.27	Renofa Yamaguchi	1-0	Kamatamare Sanuki	Shimonoseki Stadium	5,034
17	2018.06.02	Omiya Ardija	2-2	Kamatamare Sanuki	NACK5 Stadium Omiya	8,085
18	2018.06.10	Kamatamare Sanuki	0-1	FC Gifu	Pikara Stadium	2,014
19	2018.06.16	Roasso Kumamoto	1-1	Kamatamare Sanuki	Egao Kenko Stadium	3,740
20	2018.06.23	Kamatamare Sanuki	1-0	Fagiano Okayama	Pikara Stadium	5,668
21	2018.06.30	Kamatamare Sanuki	3-1	Tokyo Verdy	Pikara Stadium	2,860
22	2018.07.07	Mito HollyHock	5-0	Kamatamare Sanuki	K's denki Stadium Mito	3,884
23	2018.07.15	Avispa Fukuoka	3-1	Kamatamare Sanuki	Level5 Stadium	8,011
24	2018.07.21	Kamatamare Sanuki	2-1	JEF United Chiba	Pikara Stadium	2,340
25	2018.07.25	FC Gifu	2-3	Kamatamare Sanuki	Gifu Nagaragawa Stadium	4,899
27	2018.08.05	Fagiano Okayama	3-0	Kamatamare Sanuki	City Light Stadium	10,594
28	2018.08.11	Kamatamare Sanuki	0-1	Matsumoto Yamaga	Pikara Stadium	2,981
29	2018.08.18	Yokohama FC	2-0	Kamatamare Sanuki	NHK Spring Mitsuzawa Football Stadium	5,002
30	2018.08.25	Kamatamare Sanuki	0-2	Zweigen Kanazawa	Pikara Stadium	2,349
31	2018.09.01	Kamatamare Sanuki	0-4	Tokushima Vortis	Pikara Stadium	4,446
32	2018.09.08	Ehime FC	0-0	Kamatamare Sanuki	Ningineer Stadium	2,545
33	2018.09.15	Oita Trinita	5-0	Kamatamare Sanuki	Oita Bank Dome	11,156
26	2018.09.19	Kamatamare Sanuki	1-1	Montedio Yamagata	Pikara Stadium	1,510
34	2018.09.23	Kamatamare Sanuki	0-2	Omiya Ardija	Pikara Stadium	2,630
36	2018.10.06	Albirex Niigata	2-1	Kamatamare Sanuki	Denka Big Swan Stadium	15,892
37	2018.10.14	Kamatamare Sanuki	1-0	Roasso Kumamoto	Pikara Stadium	3,850
38	2018.10.21	Kamatamare Sanuki	0-0	Renofa Yamaguchi	Pikara Stadium	3,280
39	2018.10.28	Ventforet Kofu	1-0	Kamatamare Sanuki	Yamanashi Chuo Bank Stadium	7,633
35	2018.10.31	Kamatamare Sanuki	1-1	FC Machida Zelvia	Pikara Stadium	1,780
40	2018.11.04	Kamatamare Sanuki	1-2	Tochigi SC	Pikara Stadium	2,883
41	2018.11.11	Tokyo Verdy	1-0	Kamatamare Sanuki	Ajinomoto Stadium	10,529
42	2018.11.17	Kamatamare Sanuki	0-2	Kyoto Sanga FC	Pikara Stadium	3,636
