= Kijima =

Kijima (written: 木島, 木嶋 or 杵島, 黄島) is a Japanese surname. Notable people with the surname include:

- Ai Kijima (born 1970), Japanese artist
- Kanae Kijima (木嶋 佳苗, born 1974), Japanese serial killer
- Kesao Kijima (木島 袈裟雄), Japanese general
- Kyoichi Kijima (木嶋 恭一, born 1951), Japanese academic
- Kijima Matabei (来島 又兵衛, 1817–1864), Japanese samurai
- Noriko Kijima (木嶋 のりこ, born 1988), Japanese gravure idol and actress
- Ryosuke Kijima (木島 良輔, born 1979), Japanese footballer
- Ryūichi Kijima (木島 隆一), Japanese voice actor
- Takashi Kijima (杵島 隆, 1920–2011), Japanese photographer
- Tetsuya Kijima (木島 徹也, born 1983), Japanese footballer
- Yu Kijima (木島 悠, born 1986), Japanese footballer
