= My Hero Academia: Battle for All =

2016 video game

- Cover art
- Developer: Dimps
- Publisher: Bandai Namco Entertainment
- Series: My Hero Academia
- Platform: Nintendo 3DS
- Release: JP: May 19, 2016
- Genre: Fighting
- Modes: Single-player, multiplayer

My Hero Academia: Battle for All (Note: Japanese: 僕のヒーローアカデミア バトル・フォー・オール, Hepburn: Boku no Hīrō Akademia Batoru fō Ōru) is a 2016 fighting game developed by Dimps and published by Bandai Namco Entertainment for the Nintendo 3DS, based on the manga series My Hero Academia by Kōhei Horikoshi. It was released on May 19, 2016, in Japan.

== Gameplay ==
Battle for All is a 3D fighting game where two characters battle using normal attack combos in addition to special attacks (called "Deathblows"). Dealing or receiving damage fills a player's "Hero Gauge" up to three levels. Using a Super attack spends one level of the Hero Gauge, while a "Plus Ultra" attack consumes all three levels. Each character also has a "Quirk Control" gauge which can be increased with the touch screen, providing different effects depending on the character. After selecting a character, players also select two "Sidekick" characters who provide various benefits when called upon in combat, such as automatic blocking or temporarily immobilizing the opponent.

Five different game modes are included; "Hero Academia" is the game's story mode, which loosely adapts the anime's storyline through the end of the first season. "Free Battle" allows players to choose any opponent and freely alter game rules, such as time limit, number of rounds, and enemy strength. "Wireless Battle" is a local multiplayer mode, allowing two players who own the game to play together or for a second player who does not own the game to join using the Nintendo 3DS Download Play feature. Completing the "Hero Academia" mode as Izuku unlocks "Hero Challenge", an arcade-style mode where players must fight several characters in a row without losing, as well as the ability to play through "Hero Academia" mode with the other playable characters.

Players earn in-game currency from all modes, which can be used to unlock clothing items to customize characters. Completing story missions and "Curriculum" challenge missions also gives experience points, which can be used to level up a character and choose which of their stats to increase, such as power or speed.

== Characters ==
Battle for All features 14 playable characters and 14 "Sidekick" characters, whose actors all reprise their roles from the anime series.

Playable characters	Sidekick characters
Izuku Midoriya; Katsuki Bakugo; Ochaco Uraraka; Tenya Ida; Shoto Todoroki; Tsuyu Asui; Minoru Mineta; Eijiro Kirishima; Momo Yaoyorozu; Denki Kaminari; Yuga Aoyama; Kyoka Jiro; All Might; Tomura Shigaraki	Fumikage Tokoyami; Mezo Shoji; Mashirao Ojiro; Hanta Sero; Shota Aizawa; Mt. Lady; Mina Ashido; Toru Hagakure; Recovery Girl; Kurogiri; Nomu; Cementoss; Thirteen; Midnight

== Development and release ==
Battle for All was announced on November 18, 2015, in Weekly Shōnen Jump alongside a separate arcade card game titled My Hero Academia: Clash! Heroes Battle (僕のヒーローアカデミア 激突！ヒーローズバトル, Boku no Hīrō Akademia Gekitotsu! Hīrōzu Batoru). A demo was released on the Nintendo eShop on April 27, 2016. Developed by Dimps and published by Bandai Namco Entertainment, Battle for All was released in Japan for the Nintendo 3DS on May 19, 2016. First-print editions also included two cards for Clash! Heroes Battle and a Nintendo 3DS system theme. Prior to release, a contest was held to design an alternate costume for Izuku Midoriya to wear in-game.

== Reception ==
Todd Ciolek of Anime News Network was critical of the game's presentation and combat simplicity, stating "...battles progress along the same simple combos as the more routine Dragon Ball Z fighters. It makes an effort to capture the idiosyncrasies of various characters, but they struggle to come through with marginal comic-book sound effects and the occasional burst of manga speedlines." Famitsu gave the game a 31/40 rating in its review. In its first three days on sale, Battle for All sold 5,607 copies.
