= Daichi Ishikawa =

Japanese footballer (born 1996)

Daichi Ishikawa 石川 大地
Personal information
- Full name: Daichi Ishikawa
- Date of birth: February 22, 1996 (age 30)
- Place of birth: Kamisu, Ibaraki, Japan
- Height: 1.78 m (5 ft 10 in)
- Position: Forward

Team information
- Current team: JEF United Chiba
- Number: 20

Youth career
- 2011–2013: Mito Keimei High School

College career
Years	Team	Apps	(Gls)
2014–2017	Toin University of Yokohama		

Senior career*
Years	Team	Apps	(Gls)
2018–2020	FC Gifu	31	(2)
2019	→ Azul Claro Numazu (loan)	14	(2)
2021–2022	Gainare Tottori	57	(21)
2023–2024	Roasso Kumamoto	41	(17)
2025–	JEF United Chiba	47	(13)
- * Club domestic league appearances and goals as of 12 August 2026

Daichi Ishikawa (石川 大地, Ishikawa Daichi; born February 22, 1996) is a Japanese football player who plays for JEF United Chiba.

== Career ==
Born in Ibaraki Prefecture, Ishikawa was a huge Kashima Antlers fan. After attending Toin University of Yokohama, he opted to sign for FC Gifu in December 2017.

== Club statistics ==
Updated to 30 August 2018.

Club performance			League		Cup		Total	
Season	Club	League	Apps	Goals	Apps	Goals	Apps	Goals
Japan			League		Emperor's Cup		Total	
2018	FC Gifu	J2 League	3	0	0	0	3	0
Total			3	0	0	0	3	0
