= Rimu Matsuoka =

Japanese footballer

Personal information
- Date of birth: July 22, 1998 (age 28)
- Place of birth: Tokyo, Japan
- Height: 1.75 m (5 ft 9 in)
- Position: Forward

Team information
- Current team: Matsumoto Yamaga FC
- Number: 7

Youth career
- Scudetto SC
- –2016: FC Tokyo

College career
Years	Team	Apps	(Gls)
2017–2021	Keio University		

Senior career*
Years	Team	Apps	(Gls)
2016	FC Tokyo U-23	10	(1)
2021–2023	Tochigi SC	27	(0)
2023–2025	Roasso Kumamoto	89	(7)
	Matsumoto Yamaga FC	3	(0)
- * Club domestic league appearances and goals as of 24 August 2026

Rimu Matsuoka (松岡 瑠夢, Matsuoka Rimu; born July 22, 1998) is a Japanese football player who currently plays for Matsumoto Yamaga FC.

== Career ==
Rimu Matsuoka joined FC Tokyo in 2016. On, he debuted in J3 League (v SC Sagamihara).
