= Ryuga Tashiro =

Japanese footballer

Ryuga Tashiro 田代琉我
Personal information
- Full name: Ryuga Tashiro
- Date of birth: 27 August 1998 (age 28)
- Place of birth: Kanagawa Prefecture, Japan
- Height: 1.85 m (6 ft 1 in)
- Position: Goalkeeper

Team information
- Current team: Tochigi SC (on loan from Albirex Niigata)
- Number: 41

Youth career
- Hamamidaira JSC
- Yokohama Junior SC
- 2014–2016: Nihon University Fujisawa High School

College career
| Years | Team | Apps | (Gls) |
| 2017–2020 | Kokushikan University | | |

Senior career*
| Years | Team | Apps | (Gls) |
| 2021–2024 | Roasso Kumamoto | 77 | (0) |
| 2025– | Albirex Niigata | 15 | (0) |
| 2026– | → Tochigi SC (loan) | 12 | (0) |
- * Club domestic league appearances and goals as of 19:40, 21 October 2026 (UTC)

Ryuga Tashiro (田代琉我, Tashiro Ryuga; born 27 August 1998) is a Japanese footballer who plays as a goalkeeper for J3 League club Tochigi SC, on loan from Albirex Niigata.

== Youth career ==
Tashiro started his career at Hamamidaira JSC, and then went to Yokohama Junior SC. During his last school years, he attended Nihon University Fujisawa High School. In 2017, he joined Kokushikan University and would be playing in the JUFA Kanto League 2. He made his debut for the university in May 2019, in a 4–3 victory over Rikkyo University and kept his fist clean sheet in the following game in a 2–0 win over Tokai University. He played a total of 6 times during the 2019 season. In 2020, he was named as captain of the team following Kokushikan's promotion to JUFA Kanto League 1. He went on to play 9 times that season, keeping three clean sheets.

== Club career ==
In December 2020, it was announced that Tashiro would be signing for J3 League team Roasso Kumamoto for the 2021 season and he was handed the number 1 shirt. He did not make any appearances in his debut season, however Kumamoto did win the 2021 J3 League and were promoted back to the J2 League after a three-season absence.

He made his debut for the club in March 2022 and kept a clean sheet, in a 2–0 J2 League win over V-Varen Nagasaki. He only made 5 appearances across all competitions in the 2022 season, as he was unable to take the place of veteran first-choice goalkeeper Yuya Sato.

In December 2024, it was announced that Tashiro would be joining J1 League club Albirex Niigata for the 2025 season.

== Career statistics ==
=== Club ===
As of 21 October 2026.

Appearances and goals by club, season and competition
| Club | Season | League | | | National cup (Note: Includes Emperor's Cup) | | Total | |
| Club | Season | Division | Apps | Goals | Apps | Goals | Apps | Goals |
|---|---|---|---|---|---|---|---|---|
| Roasso Kumamoto | 2021 | J3 League | 0 | 0 | 0 | 0 | 0 | 0 |
| Roasso Kumamoto | 2022 | J2 League | 4 | 0 | 1 | 0 | 5 | 0 |
| Roasso Kumamoto | 2023 | J2 League | 41 | 0 | 5 | 0 | 46 | 0 |
| Roasso Kumamoto | 2024 | J2 League | 32 | 0 | 1 | 0 | 33 | 0 |
| Roasso Kumamoto | Total | | 77 | 0 | 7 | 0 | 84 | 0 |
| Albirex Niigata | 2025 | J1 League | 15 | 0 | 2 | 0 | 17 | 0 |
| Albirex Niigata | 2026 | J2/J3 (100) | 0 | 0 | – | | 0 | 0 |
| Albirex Niigata | Total | | 15 | 0 | 2 | 0 | 17 | 0 |
| Tochigi SC (loan) | 2026–27 | J3 League | 12 | 0 | 0 | 0 | 12 | 0 |
| Career total | | | 104 | 0 | 9 | 0 | 113 | 0 |
