= Shuhei Kamimura =

Japanese footballer

Shuhei Kamimura 上村 周平
Personal information
- Full name: Shuhei Kamimura
- Date of birth: October 15, 1995 (age 31)
- Place of birth: Mashiki, Kumamoto, Japan
- Height: 1.64 m (5 ft 4 1/2 in)
- Position: Midfielder

Team information
- Current team: Ehime FC
- Number: 8

Youth career
- 2008–2013: Roasso Kumamoto

Senior career*
Years	Team	Apps	(Gls)
2014–2026	Roasso Kumamoto	339	(15)
2014	→ J. League U-22 (loan)	2	(0)
2026–	Ehime FC	2	(0)
- * Club domestic league appearances and goals as of 17 August 2026 2026

Shuhei Kamimura (上村 周平, Kamimura Shuhei; born October 15, 1995 in Mashiki, Kumamoto) is a Japanese football player for Ehime FC.

== Club statistics ==
Updated to 23 February 2018.

Club performance			League		Cup		Total	
Season	Club	League	Apps	Goals	Apps	Goals	Apps	Goals
Japan			League		Emperor's Cup		Total	
2014	Roasso Kumamoto	J2 League	5	0	1	0	6	0
2015	Roasso Kumamoto	J2 League	24	0	3	0	27	0
2016	Roasso Kumamoto	J2 League	17	0	2	0	19	0
2017	Roasso Kumamoto	J2 League	27	1	1	0	28	1
Career total			73	1	7	0	80	1
