= 2014 Kamatamare Sanuki season =

Kamatamare Sanuki
2014 season
- Manager: Makoto Kitano
- Stadium: Kagawa Marugame Stadium
- J2 League: 21st

2014 Kamatamare Sanuki season.

== League table ==
Pos	Team	Pld	W	D	L	GF	GA	GD	Pts	Promotion or relegation
18	Thespakusatsu Gunma	42	14	7	21	45	54	−9	49	
19	Ehime FC	42	12	12	18	54	58	−4	48	
20	Tokyo Verdy	42	9	15	18	31	48	−17	42	
21	Kamatamare Sanuki	42	7	12	23	34	71	−37	33	Qualification for Relegation Playoffs (Note: The playoffs and direct exchange between J2 and J3 are subject to eligibility of J2-licensed teams in top 2 of 2014 J3 League)
22	Kataller Toyama (R)	42	5	8	29	28	74	−46	23	Relegation to 2015 J3 League

Updated to match(es) played on 23 November 2014. Source: J.League data
Rules for classification: 1) points; 2) goal difference; 3) number of goals scored.
(R) Relegated

== J2 League ==
Match	Date	Team	Score	Team	Venue	Attendance
1	2014.03.02	FC Gifu	3-1	Kamatamare Sanuki	Gifu Nagaragawa Stadium	11,069
2	2014.03.09	Kamatamare Sanuki	1-4	Júbilo Iwata	Kagawa Marugame Stadium	10,421
3	2014.03.16	Oita Trinita	1-0	Kamatamare Sanuki	Oita Bank Dome	7,053
4	2014.03.22	Kamatamare Sanuki	0-5	Matsumoto Yamaga FC	Kagawa Marugame Stadium	2,916
5	2014.03.30	Giravanz Kitakyushu	2-1	Kamatamare Sanuki	Honjo Stadium	1,573
6	2014.04.05	Kamatamare Sanuki	0-1	Tochigi SC	Kagawa Marugame Stadium	1,450
7	2014.04.13	Roasso Kumamoto	4-1	Kamatamare Sanuki	Umakana-Yokana Stadium	6,574
8	2014.04.20	Kamatamare Sanuki	1-1	Avispa Fukuoka	Kagawa Marugame Stadium	2,015
9	2014.04.26	JEF United Chiba	1-1	Kamatamare Sanuki	Fukuda Denshi Arena	6,581
10	2014.04.29	Kamatamare Sanuki	0-1	Yokohama FC	Kagawa Marugame Stadium	3,807
11	2014.05.03	Kyoto Sanga FC	4-1	Kamatamare Sanuki	Kyoto Nishikyogoku Athletic Stadium	7,340
12	2014.05.06	Kamatamare Sanuki	0-1	Tokyo Verdy	Kagawa Marugame Stadium	3,388
13	2014.05.11	Thespakusatsu Gunma	1-0	Kamatamare Sanuki	Shoda Shoyu Stadium Gunma	2,929
14	2014.05.18	Ehime FC	2-0	Kamatamare Sanuki	Ningineer Stadium	7,166
15	2014.05.24	Kamatamare Sanuki	2-1	Kataller Toyama	Kagawa Marugame Stadium	2,772
16	2014.05.31	V-Varen Nagasaki	1-1	Kamatamare Sanuki	Nagasaki Stadium	3,031
17	2014.06.07	Kamatamare Sanuki	1-0	Consadole Sapporo	Kagawa Marugame Stadium	2,626
18	2014.06.14	Shonan Bellmare	3-1	Kamatamare Sanuki	Shonan BMW Stadium Hiratsuka	6,827
19	2014.06.21	Kamatamare Sanuki	0-3	Montedio Yamagata	Kagawa Marugame Stadium	1,921
20	2014.06.28	Kamatamare Sanuki	0-0	Mito HollyHock	Kagawa Marugame Stadium	2,328
21	2014.07.05	Fagiano Okayama	2-2	Kamatamare Sanuki	Kanko Stadium	12,359
22	2014.07.20	Kataller Toyama	1-1	Kamatamare Sanuki	Toyama Stadium	4,602
23	2014.07.26	Kamatamare Sanuki	1-2	FC Gifu	Kagawa Marugame Stadium	3,337
24	2014.07.30	Júbilo Iwata	4-2	Kamatamare Sanuki	Yamaha Stadium	7,842
25	2014.08.03	Tochigi SC	1-2	Kamatamare Sanuki	Tochigi Green Stadium	9,131
26	2014.08.10	Kamatamare Sanuki	1-1	Roasso Kumamoto	Kagawa Marugame Stadium	2,066
27	2014.08.17	Yokohama FC	4-2	Kamatamare Sanuki	NHK Spring Mitsuzawa Football Stadium	3,912
28	2014.08.24	Kamatamare Sanuki	2-2	Kyoto Sanga FC	Kagawa Marugame Stadium	2,718
29	2014.08.31	Kamatamare Sanuki	2-1	Fagiano Okayama	Kagawa Marugame Stadium	7,722
30	2014.09.06	Tokyo Verdy	0-1	Kamatamare Sanuki	Ajinomoto Stadium	2,434
31	2014.09.14	Kamatamare Sanuki	0-2	Shonan Bellmare	Kagawa Marugame Stadium	3,510
32	2014.09.20	Matsumoto Yamaga FC	0-0	Kamatamare Sanuki	Matsumotodaira Park Stadium	9,469
33	2014.09.23	Kamatamare Sanuki	0-1	V-Varen Nagasaki	Kagawa Marugame Stadium	2,501
34	2014.09.28	Montedio Yamagata	4-0	Kamatamare Sanuki	ND Soft Stadium Yamagata	6,104
35	2014.10.04	Kamatamare Sanuki	1-0	Thespakusatsu Gunma	Kagawa Marugame Stadium	1,827
36	2014.10.11	Avispa Fukuoka	1-2	Kamatamare Sanuki	Level5 Stadium	4,260
37	2014.10.19	Kamatamare Sanuki	1-2	Ehime FC	Kagawa Marugame Stadium	4,265
38	2014.10.26	Mito HollyHock	0-0	Kamatamare Sanuki	K's denki Stadium Mito	3,444
39	2014.11.01	Kamatamare Sanuki	1-1	Giravanz Kitakyushu	Kagawa Marugame Stadium	1,696
40	2014.11.09	Consadole Sapporo	1-1	Kamatamare Sanuki	Sapporo Dome	12,954
41	2014.11.15	Kamatamare Sanuki	0-1	Oita Trinita	Kagawa Marugame Stadium	2,750
42	2014.11.23	Kamatamare Sanuki	0-1	JEF United Chiba	Kagawa Marugame Stadium	3,628
