= Shohei Aihara =

Japanese professional footballer

Personal information
- Date of birth: 26 June 1996 (age 30)
- Place of birth: Hokkaido, Japan
- Height: 1.78 m (5 ft 10 in)
- Position: Forward

Team information
- Current team: Blaublitz Akita
- Number: 24

Youth career
- SSS Sapporo
- Consadole Sapporo

College career
Years	Team	Apps	(Gls)
2015–2018	Kindai University		

Senior career*
Years	Team	Apps	(Gls)
2019–2022	FC Gifu	66	(8)
2022–2023	Roasso Kumamoto	54	(7)
2024–2025	FC Gifu	53	(9)
2025–2026	Mito HollyHock	11	(0)
2026–	Blaublitz Akita	1	(0)
- * Club domestic league appearances and goals as of 14 August 2026

Shohei Aihara (粟飯原 尚平, Aihara Shōhei; born 26 May 1996) is a Japanese professional footballer who plays as a forward for Blaublitz Akita.

== Youth career ==
Aihara suffered from consistent injuries during his time at Consadole Sapporo U18s.

== Career ==
=== First spell at Gifu ===
On 13 December 2018, Aihara was announced as a 2019 season signing for FC Gifu, joining from Kindai University. Aihara scored on his league debut against Kyoto Sanga on 30 March 2019, scoring in the 83rd minute. On 4 December 2021, the club decided not to renew Aihara's contract.

=== Roasso Kumamoto ===
On 22 December 2021, Aihara was announced at Roasso Kumamoto. He made his league debut against Renofa Yamaguchi on 20 February 2022. Aihara scored his first league goal against Omiya Ardija on 5 March 2022, scoring in the 86th minute.

=== Return to Gifu ===
On 26 December 2023, Aihara was announced at Gifu. He made his league debut against Fukushima United on 24 February 2024. Aihara scored his first league goal against Kamatamare Sanuki on 10 March 2024, scoring in the 82nd minute.
