= 2017 Kamatamare Sanuki season =

Kamatamare Sanuki
2017 season
- Manager: Makoto Kitano
- Stadium: Pikara Stadium
- J2 League: 19th

2017 Kamatamare Sanuki season.

== J2 League ==
=== League table ===
Pos	Team	Pld	W	D	L	GF	GA	GD	Pts
18	FC Gifu	42	11	13	18	56	68	−12	46
19	Kamatamare Sanuki	42	8	14	20	41	61	−20	38
20	Renofa Yamaguchi	42	11	5	26	48	69	−21	38

Updated to match(es) played on 28 November 2017. Source: 2017 MEIJI YASUDA J2 LEAGUE League table
Rules for classification: 1) Points; 2) Goal difference; 3) Goals scored

=== Match details ===
J2 League match details
Match	Date	Team	Score	Team	Venue	Attendance
1	2017.02.26	Roasso Kumamoto	2-1	Kamatamare Sanuki	Egao Kenko Stadium	7,027
2	2017.03.05	Kamatamare Sanuki	2-2	FC Machida Zelvia	Pikara Stadium	4,806
3	2017.03.12	Kamatamare Sanuki	2-2	Ehime FC	Pikara Stadium	4,037
4	2017.03.19	Montedio Yamagata	0-0	Kamatamare Sanuki	ND Soft Stadium Yamagata	9,828
5	2017.03.26	Renofa Yamaguchi FC	1-0	Kamatamare Sanuki	Ishin Memorial Park Stadium	4,254
6	2017.04.02	Kamatamare Sanuki	3-0	Shonan Bellmare	Pikara Stadium	2,983
7	2017.04.08	Nagoya Grampus	2-1	Kamatamare Sanuki	Paloma Mizuho Stadium	7,046
8	2017.04.16	Kamatamare Sanuki	1-1	Fagiano Okayama	Pikara Stadium	6,872
9	2017.04.23	Kamatamare Sanuki	1-3	FC Gifu	Pikara Stadium	3,006
10	2017.04.29	Matsumoto Yamaga FC	4-0	Kamatamare Sanuki	Matsumotodaira Park Stadium	12,696
11	2017.05.03	Kamatamare Sanuki	1-1	JEF United Chiba	Pikara Stadium	3,867
12	2017.05.07	Kyoto Sanga FC	1-0	Kamatamare Sanuki	Kyoto Nishikyogoku Athletic Stadium	6,813
13	2017.05.13	Kamatamare Sanuki	0-0	Tokyo Verdy	Pikara Stadium	2,309
14	2017.05.17	Yokohama FC	2-1	Kamatamare Sanuki	NHK Spring Mitsuzawa Football Stadium	2,284
15	2017.05.21	Kamatamare Sanuki	1-2	Thespakusatsu Gunma	Pikara Stadium	2,517
16	2017.05.27	Tokushima Vortis	1-1	Kamatamare Sanuki	Pocarisweat Stadium	5,409
17	2017.06.03	Avispa Fukuoka	3-1	Kamatamare Sanuki	Level5 Stadium	6,168
18	2017.06.11	Kamatamare Sanuki	1-0	Zweigen Kanazawa	Pikara Stadium	2,727
19	2017.06.17	Oita Trinita	2-1	Kamatamare Sanuki	Oita Bank Dome	6,901
20	2017.06.25	Mito HollyHock	2-1	Kamatamare Sanuki	K's denki Stadium Mito	3,242
21	2017.07.01	Kamatamare Sanuki	0-1	V-Varen Nagasaki	Pikara Stadium	2,994
22	2017.07.08	JEF United Chiba	4-3	Kamatamare Sanuki	Fukuda Denshi Arena	9,498
23	2017.07.15	Kamatamare Sanuki	1-3	Renofa Yamaguchi FC	Pikara Stadium	3,707
24	2017.07.22	Tokyo Verdy	3-3	Kamatamare Sanuki	Ajinomoto Stadium	3,980
25	2017.07.29	Kamatamare Sanuki	0-1	Oita Trinita	Pikara Stadium	3,143
26	2017.08.05	Kamatamare Sanuki	2-0	Mito HollyHock	Pikara Stadium	2,000
27	2017.08.11	Thespakusatsu Gunma	1-2	Kamatamare Sanuki	Shoda Shoyu Stadium Gunma	2,589
28	2017.08.16	Kamatamare Sanuki	1-0	Yokohama FC	Pikara Stadium	3,863
29	2017.08.20	FC Gifu	0-1	Kamatamare Sanuki	Gifu Nagaragawa Stadium	5,301
30	2017.08.26	Zweigen Kanazawa	1-2	Kamatamare Sanuki	Ishikawa Athletics Stadium	3,029
31	2017.09.02	Kamatamare Sanuki	2-2	Avispa Fukuoka	Pikara Stadium	4,557
32	2017.09.10	Kamatamare Sanuki	0-0	Roasso Kumamoto	Pikara Stadium	3,208
33	2017.09.16	Shonan Bellmare	1-0	Kamatamare Sanuki	Shonan BMW Stadium Hiratsuka	4,453
34	2017.09.23	Fagiano Okayama	0-1	Kamatamare Sanuki	City Light Stadium	10,578
35	2017.10.01	Kamatamare Sanuki	0-0	Tokushima Vortis	Pikara Stadium	6,753
36	2017.10.08	Kamatamare Sanuki	0-4	Kyoto Sanga FC	Pikara Stadium	3,397
37	2017.10.15	Ehime FC	2-1	Kamatamare Sanuki	Ningineer Stadium	3,658
38	2017.10.22	Kamatamare Sanuki	0-0	Montedio Yamagata	Pikara Stadium	1,191
39	2017.10.29	FC Machida Zelvia	1-1	Kamatamare Sanuki	Machida Stadium	2,383
40	2017.11.05	Kamatamare Sanuki	1-1	Matsumoto Yamaga FC	Pikara Stadium	3,977
41	2017.11.11	V-Varen Nagasaki	3-1	Kamatamare Sanuki	Transcosmos Stadium Nagasaki	22,407
42	2017.11.19	Kamatamare Sanuki	0-2	Nagoya Grampus	Pikara Stadium	7,994
