= Shota Aizawa =

Japanese footballer

Shota Aizawa 相澤 祥太
Personal information
- Date of birth: 19 April 1996 (age 30)
- Place of birth: Tokyo, Japan
- Height: 1.77 m (5 ft 10 in)
- Position: Midfielder

Team information
- Current team: Nankatsu SC
- Number: 44

Youth career
- FC Kitano
- –2012: JEFA FC
- 2013–2015: RKU Kashiwa High School

College career
Years	Team	Apps	(Gls)
2015–2018	Ryutsu Keizai University		

Senior career*
Years	Team	Apps	(Gls)
2016	Ryutsu Keizai University FC	1	(0)
2019	SWQ Thunder	12	(3)
2020	Roasso Kumamoto	15	(0)
2021–	Nankatsu SC	26	(0)
- * Club domestic league appearances and goals as of 15 January 2023, 7:40 (UTC)

Shota Aizawa (相澤 祥太, Aizawa Shota; born 19 April 1996) is a Japanese footballer currently playing as a midfielder for Nankatsu SC.

== Career statistics ==
=== Club ===
As of 22 June 2021.

Club	Season	League			National Cup		League Cup		Other		Total	
Club	Season	Division	Apps	Goals	Apps	Goals	Apps	Goals	Apps	Goals	Apps	Goals
Ryutsu Keizai University FC	2016	JFL	1	0	0	0	–		0	0	1	0
SWQ Thunder	2019	NPL Queensland	12	3	0	0	–		0	0	12	3
Roasso Kumamoto	2020	J3 League	15	0	0	0	–		0	0	15	0
Nankatsu SC	2021	Kantō Soccer League Div 2	0	0	0	0	–		0	0	0	0
Career total			28	3	0	0	0	0	0	0	28	3

== See also ==
- Football in Japan
