= 2015 Kamatamare Sanuki season =

Kamatamare Sanuki
2015 season
- Manager: Makoto Kitano
- Stadium: Pikara Stadium
- J2 League: 16th

2015 Kamatamare Sanuki season.

== J2 League ==
=== League table ===
Pos	Team	Pld	W	D	L	GF	GA	GD	Pts
14	Tokushima Vortis	42	13	14	15	35	44	−9	53
15	Yokohama FC	42	13	13	16	33	58	−25	52
16	Kamatamare Sanuki	42	12	15	15	30	33	−3	51
17	Kyoto Sanga	42	12	14	16	45	51	−6	50
18	Thespakusatsu Gunma	42	13	9	20	34	56	−22	48

Source: Meiji Yasuda J2 League Standing
Rules for classification: 1) Points; 2) Goal difference; 3) Goals scored

=== Match details ===
J2 League match details
Match	Date	Team	Score	Team	Venue	Attendance
1	2015.03.08	Kamatamare Sanuki	2-0	Oita Trinita	Kagawa Marugame Stadium	4,198
2	2015.03.15	FC Gifu	1-0	Kamatamare Sanuki	Gifu Nagaragawa Stadium	8,332
3	2015.03.21	Kamatamare Sanuki	1-0	Júbilo Iwata	Kagawa Marugame Stadium	4,334
4	2015.03.29	Kyoto Sanga FC	1-1	Kamatamare Sanuki	Kyoto Nishikyogoku Athletic Stadium	4,420
5	2015.04.01	Kamatamare Sanuki	0-0	Mito HollyHock	Kagawa Marugame Stadium	2,152
6	2015.04.05	Giravanz Kitakyushu	2-0	Kamatamare Sanuki	Honjo Stadium	2,080
7	2015.04.11	Kamatamare Sanuki	0-0	Consadole Sapporo	Kagawa Marugame Stadium	2,779
8	2015.04.19	Zweigen Kanazawa	1-0	Kamatamare Sanuki	Ishikawa Athletics Stadium	2,333
9	2015.04.26	Kamatamare Sanuki	1-3	Cerezo Osaka	Kagawa Marugame Stadium	10,447
10	2015.04.29	Thespakusatsu Gunma	1-0	Kamatamare Sanuki	Shoda Shoyu Stadium Gunma	2,530
11	2015.05.03	Kamatamare Sanuki	1-0	Tokyo Verdy	Kagawa Marugame Stadium	2,938
12	2015.05.06	Yokohama FC	1-2	Kamatamare Sanuki	NHK Spring Mitsuzawa Football Stadium	4,357
13	2015.05.09	Kamatamare Sanuki	0-1	JEF United Chiba	Kagawa Marugame Stadium	2,482
14	2015.05.17	Kamatamare Sanuki	0-0	Tochigi SC	Kagawa Marugame Stadium	2,389
15	2015.05.24	Avispa Fukuoka	1-3	Kamatamare Sanuki	Level5 Stadium	6,103
16	2015.05.31	Kamatamare Sanuki	0-1	Fagiano Okayama	Kagawa Marugame Stadium	6,556
17	2015.06.06	Omiya Ardija	2-0	Kamatamare Sanuki	NACK5 Stadium Omiya	7,693
18	2015.06.14	Tokushima Vortis	2-2	Kamatamare Sanuki	Pocarisweat Stadium	6,304
19	2015.06.21	Kamatamare Sanuki	0-0	V-Varen Nagasaki	Kagawa Marugame Stadium	2,729
20	2015.06.28	Roasso Kumamoto	0-1	Kamatamare Sanuki	Umakana-Yokana Stadium	8,309
21	2015.07.04	Kamatamare Sanuki	0-0	Ehime FC	Kagawa Marugame Stadium	3,129
22	2015.07.08	Júbilo Iwata	1-1	Kamatamare Sanuki	Yamaha Stadium	5,875
23	2015.07.12	Kamatamare Sanuki	2-2	Zweigen Kanazawa	Kagawa Marugame Stadium	2,709
24	2015.07.18	Consadole Sapporo	0-1	Kamatamare Sanuki	Sapporo Dome	8,120
25	2015.07.22	Tochigi SC	1-0	Kamatamare Sanuki	Tochigi Green Stadium	2,581
26	2015.07.26	Kamatamare Sanuki	1-0	Giravanz Kitakyushu	Kagawa Marugame Stadium	2,529
27	2015.08.01	Tokyo Verdy	2-0	Kamatamare Sanuki	Ajinomoto Stadium	4,807
28	2015.08.08	Kamatamare Sanuki	0-1	Thespakusatsu Gunma	Kagawa Marugame Stadium	2,532
29	2015.08.15	Mito HollyHock	0-1	Kamatamare Sanuki	K's denki Stadium Mito	4,262
30	2015.08.23	V-Varen Nagasaki	0-0	Kamatamare Sanuki	Nagasaki Stadium	3,630
31	2015.09.13	Kamatamare Sanuki	0-1	Avispa Fukuoka	Pikara Stadium	2,648
32	2015.09.20	Kamatamare Sanuki	0-1	Tokushima Vortis	Pikara Stadium	8,249
33	2015.09.23	Ehime FC	1-0	Kamatamare Sanuki	Ningineer Stadium	4,769
34	2015.09.27	Kamatamare Sanuki	1-1	Kyoto Sanga FC	Pikara Stadium	2,585
35	2015.10.04	Oita Trinita	0-0	Kamatamare Sanuki	Oita Bank Dome	7,117
36	2015.10.10	Kamatamare Sanuki	1-1	Yokohama FC	Pikara Stadium	2,595
37	2015.10.18	Kamatamare Sanuki	0-2	Roasso Kumamoto	Pikara Stadium	2,380
38	2015.10.25	Cerezo Osaka	0-0	Kamatamare Sanuki	Kincho Stadium	10,283
39	2015.11.01	Fagiano Okayama	1-2	Kamatamare Sanuki	City Light Stadium	9,436
40	2015.11.08	Kamatamare Sanuki	1-1	Omiya Ardija	Pikara Stadium	3,864
41	2015.11.14	Kamatamare Sanuki	3-0	FC Gifu	Pikara Stadium	2,600
42	2015.11.23	JEF United Chiba	0-2	Kamatamare Sanuki	Fukuda Denshi Arena	10,400
