= Tetsuya Kijima =

Japanese footballer

Personal information
- Date of birth: August 20, 1983 (age 43)
- Place of birth: Chiba, Japan
- Height: 1.77 m (5 ft 9 1/2 in)
- Position: Forward

Youth career
- 1999–2001: Teikyo Junior-senior; High School

Senior career*
Years	Team	Apps	(Gls)
2002	Sagawa Express Tokyo	0	(0)
2003	Okinawa Kariyushi FC	0	(0)
2005	TDK	9	(1)
2006	Okinawa Kariyushi FC	11	(3)
2006–2007	FC Gifu	12	(0)
2008	MIO Biwako Kusatsu	13	(3)
2009	Okinawa Kariyushi FC	2	(0)
2010–2012	Matsumoto Yamaga	77	(28)
2013–2014	Machida Zelvia	50	(7)
2015–2019	Kamatamare Sanuki	127	(18)
2020	Tokyo 23 FC	6	(1)
- * Club domestic league appearances and goals as of 16 November 2020

Tetsuya Kijima (木島 徹也, born August 20, 1983) is a Japanese football player for Kamatamare Sanuki.

== Career ==
His elder brother Ryosuke is also a professional footballer.

== Club statistics ==
Updated to 23 February 2018.

Club performance			League		Cup		Total	
Season	Club	League	Apps	Goals	Apps	Goals	Apps	Goals
Japan			League		Emperor's Cup		Total	
2002	Sagawa Express Tokyo	JFL	0	0	–		0	0
2003	Okinawa Kariyushi FC	JRL (Kyushu)	0	0	0	0	0	0
2005	TDK	JRL (Tohoku, Div. 1)	9	1	0	0	9	1
2006	Okinawa Kariyushi FC	JRL (Kyushu)	11	3	–		11	3
2006	FC Gifu	JRL (Tokai)	–		–		0	0
2007	FC Gifu	JFL	12	0	1	0	13	0
2008	MIO Biwako Kusatsu	JFL	13	3	0	0	13	3
2009	Okinawa Kariyushi FC	JRL (Kyushu)	2	0	2	1	4	1
2010	Matsumoto Yamaga	JFL	29	7	2	1	31	8
2011	Matsumoto Yamaga	JFL	25	19	2	0	27	19
2012	Matsumoto Yamaga	J2 League	23	2	0	0	23	2
2013	Machida Zelvia	JFL	20	2	–		20	2
2014	Machida Zelvia	J3 League	30	5	–		30	5
2015	Kamatamare Sanuki	J2 League	12	0	1	0	13	0
2016	Kamatamare Sanuki	J2 League	35	10	0	0	35	10
2017	Kamatamare Sanuki	J2 League	33	6	0	0	33	6
Total			254	58	8	2	262	60
