= Yuki Omoto =

Japanese footballer

Personal information
- Date of birth: September 24, 1994 (age 32)
- Place of birth: Hikone, Shiga, Japan
- Height: 1.74 m (5 ft 9 in)
- Position: Right back

Team information
- Current team: Roasso Kumamoto
- Number: 41

Youth career
- –2009: FC Koto
- 2010–2012: Yasu High School

College career
Years	Team	Apps	(Gls)
2013–2016	Hannan University		

Senior career*
Years	Team	Apps	(Gls)
2017	FC Gifu	42	(4)
2018	Tokushima Vortis	21	(0)
2018–2019	V-Varen Nagasaki	9	(0)
2020–2021	Albirex Niigata	26	(1)
2022–2023	FC Ryukyu	39	(1)
2023–	Roasso Kumamoto	100	(8)
- * Club domestic league appearances and goals as of 23 August 2026

Yuki Omoto (大本 祐槻, Ōmoto Yūki; born September 24, 1994) is a Japanese football player who currently plays for Roasso Kumamoto.

== Career ==
Yuki Omoto joined J2 League club FC Gifu in 2017.

== Club statistics ==
Updated to 22 February 2019.

Appearances and goals by club, season and competition
Club	Season	League			Emperor's Cup		Total	
Club	Season	Division	Apps	Goals	Apps	Goals	Apps	Goals
FC Gifu	2017	J2 League	42	4	2	1	44	5
Tokushima Vortis	2018	J2 League	21	0	2	0	23	0
V-Varen Nagasaki	2018	J1 League	7	0	–		7	0
Career total			70	4	4	1	74	5
