= 2016 Kamatamare Sanuki season =

Kamatamare Sanuki
2016 season
- Manager: Makoto Kitano
- Stadium: Pikara Stadium
- J2 League: 19th

2016 Kamatamare Sanuki season.

== J2 League ==
=== League table ===
Pos	Team	Pld	W	D	L	GF	GA	GD	Pts
18	Tokyo Verdy	42	10	13	19	43	61	−18	43
19	Kamatamare Sanuki	42	10	13	19	43	62	−19	43
20	FC Gifu	42	12	7	23	47	71	−24	43

Updated to match(es) played on 20 November 2016. Source: 2016 MEIJI YASUDA J2 LEAGUE League table
Rules for classification: 1) Points; 2) Goal difference; 3) Goals scored

=== Match details ===
J2 League match details
Match	Date	Team	Score	Team	Venue	Attendance
1	2016.02.28	Yokohama FC	0-1	Kamatamare Sanuki	NHK Spring Mitsuzawa Football Stadium	9,929
2	2016.03.06	Kamatamare Sanuki	2-1	Tokyo Verdy	Pikara Stadium	2,858
3	2016.03.13	Kamatamare Sanuki	2-2	V-Varen Nagasaki	Pikara Stadium	2,452
4	2016.03.20	Thespakusatsu Gunma	1-2	Kamatamare Sanuki	Shoda Shoyu Stadium Gunma	3,195
5	2016.03.26	Kamatamare Sanuki	1-2	Tokushima Vortis	Pikara Stadium	4,947
6	2016.04.03	Renofa Yamaguchi FC	1-0	Kamatamare Sanuki	Ishin Memorial Park Stadium	5,126
7	2016.04.09	Kamatamare Sanuki	3-2	FC Gifu	Pikara Stadium	2,350
8	2016.04.17	Shimizu S-Pulse	2-2	Kamatamare Sanuki	IAI Stadium Nihondaira	6,552
9	2016.04.23	Ehime FC	1-0	Kamatamare Sanuki	Ningineer Stadium	4,323
10	2016.04.29	Kamatamare Sanuki	1-1	Giravanz Kitakyushu	Pikara Stadium	3,365
11	2016.05.03	JEF United Chiba	1-1	Kamatamare Sanuki	Fukuda Denshi Arena	11,439
12	2016.05.07	Kamatamare Sanuki	0-1	FC Machida Zelvia	Pikara Stadium	2,739
13	2016.05.15	Matsumoto Yamaga FC	0-0	Kamatamare Sanuki	Matsumotodaira Park Stadium	11,402
14	2016.05.22	Kamatamare Sanuki	0-1	Hokkaido Consadole Sapporo	Pikara Stadium	3,208
15	2016.05.28	Kamatamare Sanuki	1-1	Mito HollyHock	Pikara Stadium	1,924
16	2016.06.04	Cerezo Osaka	2-3	Kamatamare Sanuki	Yanmar Stadium Nagai	18,002
17	2016.06.08	Kamatamare Sanuki	1-3	Kyoto Sanga FC	Pikara Stadium	2,153
18	2016.06.12	Montedio Yamagata	2-1	Kamatamare Sanuki	ND Soft Stadium Yamagata	7,043
19	2016.06.19	Roasso Kumamoto	2-0	Kamatamare Sanuki	Best Amenity Stadium	5,191
20	2016.06.26	Kamatamare Sanuki	0-1	Fagiano Okayama	Pikara Stadium	6,716
21	2016.07.03	Zweigen Kanazawa	0-0	Kamatamare Sanuki	Ishikawa Athletics Stadium	2,844
22	2016.07.10	Kamatamare Sanuki	1-1	Ehime FC	Pikara Stadium	4,539
23	2016.07.16	Kamatamare Sanuki	0-2	Renofa Yamaguchi FC	Pikara Stadium	3,212
24	2016.07.20	Kyoto Sanga FC	1-0	Kamatamare Sanuki	Kyoto Nishikyogoku Athletic Stadium	4,458
25	2016.07.24	Kamatamare Sanuki	2-1	Cerezo Osaka	Pikara Stadium	11,376
26	2016.07.31	Kamatamare Sanuki	2-1	Montedio Yamagata	Pikara Stadium	2,494
27	2016.08.07	FC Gifu	1-1	Kamatamare Sanuki	Gifu Nagaragawa Stadium	4,431
28	2016.08.11	Kamatamare Sanuki	1-3	Thespakusatsu Gunma	Pikara Stadium	2,744
29	2016.08.14	Fagiano Okayama	3-1	Kamatamare Sanuki	City Light Stadium	12,233
30	2016.08.21	Mito HollyHock	3-2	Kamatamare Sanuki	K's denki Stadium Mito	4,105
31	2016.09.11	Kamatamare Sanuki	1-1	Zweigen Kanazawa	Pikara Stadium	2,419
32	2016.09.18	Tokyo Verdy	3-2	Kamatamare Sanuki	Ajinomoto Field Nishigaoka	3,347
33	2016.09.25	Kamatamare Sanuki	1-0	Yokohama FC	Pikara Stadium	3,241
34	2016.10.02	Kamatamare Sanuki	2-4	Matsumoto Yamaga FC	Pikara Stadium	3,082
35	2016.10.08	Tokushima Vortis	0-0	Kamatamare Sanuki	Pocarisweat Stadium	4,177
36	2016.10.16	Giravanz Kitakyushu	3-0	Kamatamare Sanuki	Honjo Stadium	2,307
37	2016.10.23	Kamatamare Sanuki	0-0	Roasso Kumamoto	Pikara Stadium	2,524
38	2016.10.30	FC Machida Zelvia	0-1	Kamatamare Sanuki	Machida Stadium	3,580
39	2016.11.03	Hokkaido Consadole Sapporo	4-1	Kamatamare Sanuki	Sapporo Dome	21,582
40	2016.11.06	Kamatamare Sanuki	1-2	Shimizu S-Pulse	Pikara Stadium	4,609
41	2016.11.12	V-Varen Nagasaki	1-2	Kamatamare Sanuki	Transcosmos Stadium Nagasaki	3,194
42	2016.11.20	Kamatamare Sanuki	1-1	JEF United Chiba	Pikara Stadium	4,461
