= Ryotaro Onishi =

Japanese footballer

Ryotaro Onishi 大西 遼太郎
Personal information
- Full name: Ryotaro Onishi
- Date of birth: 24 November 1997 (age 28)
- Place of birth: Shizuoka, Japan
- Height: 1.79 m (5 ft 10 in)
- Position: Midfielder

Team information
- Current team: Roasso Kumamoto
- Number: 4

Youth career
- –2015: Júbilo Iwata

College career
Years	Team	Apps	(Gls)
2016–2019	Hosei University		

Senior career*
Years	Team	Apps	(Gls)
2020–2022	FC Gifu	51	(3)
2023–	Roasso Kumamoto	100	(4)
- * Club domestic league appearances and goals as of 23 August 2026

Ryotaro Onishi (大西 遼太郎, Onishi Ryotaro; born 24 November 1997) is a Japanese footballer who plays as a midfielder for J3 League club Roasso Kumamoto.

== Career statistics ==
=== Club ===
As of 4 June 2023.

Appearances and goals by club, season and competition
Club	Season	League			National Cup		League Cup		Total	
Club	Season	Division	Apps	Goals	Apps	Goals	Apps	Goals	Apps	Goals
Japan			League		Emperor's Cup		J. League Cup		Total	
Hosei University	2019	–			4	1	–		4	1
FC Gifu	2020	J3 League	27	1	0	0	–		27	1
FC Gifu	2021	J3 League	16	1	1	0	–		17	1
FC Gifu	2022	J3 League	8	1	1	0	–		9	1
FC Gifu	Total		51	3	2	0	0	0	53	3
Roasso Kumamoto	2023	J2 League	9	1	0	0	–		9	1
Career total			60	4	6	1	0	0	66	5
