= Takeshi Oki =

Japanese footballer and manager

Takeshi Oki 大木 武
Personal information
- Full name: Takeshi Oki
- Date of birth: July 16, 1961 (age 65)
- Place of birth: Shizuoka, Shizuoka, Japan
- Height: 1.70 m (5 ft 7 in)
- Position: Midfielder

Team information
- Current team: Ehime FC (manager)

Youth career
- 1977–1979: Shimizu Higashi High School
- 1980–1983: Tokyo University of Agriculture

Senior career*
| Years | Team | Apps | (Gls) |
| 1984–1991 | Fujitsu | | |

Managerial career
- 2002: Ventforet Kofu
- 2003: Shimizu S-Pulse
- 2005–2007: Ventforet Kofu
- 2011–2013: Kyoto Sanga FC
- 2017–2019: FC Gifu
- 2020–2025: Roasso Kumamoto
- 2026–: Ehime FC
- * Club domestic league appearances and goals

Takeshi Oki (大木 武, Ōki Takeshi; born July 16, 1961) is a former Japanese football player and manager. He is the current manager of Ehime FC.

== Playing career ==
Oki was born in Shizuoka on July 16, 1961. After graduating from Tokyo University of Agriculture, he played for Fujitsu from 1984 to 1991.

== Coaching career ==
In 1993, Oki became coach for Shimizu S-Pulse. In 2002, he moved to Ventforet Kofu and he became a manager. In 2003, he returned to Shimizu S-Pulse and managed the club. In 2004, he signed with Kawasaki Frontale and he coached the youth team. In 2005, he returned to Ventforet Kofu. At the end of the 2007 season, he resigned and became an assistant coach for the Japan national team under manager Takeshi Okada until the 2010 World Cup. In 2011, he signed with Kyoto Sanga FC and he managed them until 2013. In 2017, he signed with FC Gifu. In June 2019, he resigned when team was at the bottom of the league. On 12 December 2019, it was announced that Oki was to be appointed as the manager of J3 League club, Roasso Kumamoto from 2020. Kumamoto finished 8th place in J3 League in 2020, leading J3 League promotion in 2021 The team returned to J2 League after being relegated in 2018. In the 2022 season, the team achieved a record 4th place, which is their highest ever.

== Managerial statistics ==
Update; end of the 2022 season.

| Team | From | To | Record | | | | |
| Team | From | To | G | W | D | L | Win % |
|---|---|---|---|---|---|---|---|
| Ventforet Kofu | 2002 | 2002 | 44 | 16 | 10 | 18 | 36.36 |
| Shimizu S-Pulse | 2003 | 2003 | 30 | 11 | 6 | 13 | 36.67 |
| Ventforet Kofu | 2005 | 2007 | 112 | 38 | 24 | 50 | 33.93 |
| Kyoto Sanga FC | 2011 | 2013 | 122 | 60 | 22 | 40 | 49.18 |
| FC Gifu | 2017 | 2019 | 102 | 25 | 25 | 52 | 24.51 |
| Roasso Kumamoto | 2020 | present | 104 | 49 | 28 | 27 | 47.12 |
| Total | | | 514 | 199 | 115 | 200 | 38.72 |

== Honours ==
=== Manager ===
Roasso Kumamoto

- J3 League : 2021

Individual

- J2 League Manager of the Year : 2022
