= Tomoyoshi Ikeya =

Japanese footballer and manager

Tomoyoshi Ikeya 池谷 友良
Personal information
- Full name: Tomoyoshi Ikeya
- Date of birth: June 17, 1962 (age 64)
- Place of birth: Shizuoka, Japan
- Height: 1.63 m (5 ft 4 in)
- Position: Midfielder

Youth career
- 1978–1980: Hamana High School
- 1981–1984: Chuo University

Senior career*
Years	Team	Apps	(Gls)
1985–1992	Hitachi		

Managerial career
- 2002: Kashiwa Reysol (caretaker)
- 2004: Kashiwa Reysol
- 2005–2008: Roasso Kumamoto
- 2013: Roasso Kumamoto (caretaker)
- 2017: Roasso Kumamoto
- * Club domestic league appearances and goals

Tomoyoshi Ikeya (池谷 友良, Ikeya Tomoyoshi; born June 17, 1962) is a former Japanese football player and manager.

== Playing career ==
Ikeya was born in Shizuoka Prefecture on June 17, 1962. After graduating from Chuo University, he played for Hitachi from 1985 to 1992.

== Coaching career ==
After retirement, Ikeya became a coach at Hitachi (later Kashiwa Reysol) from 1992. In 2004, he became a manager. However, in July, he was sacked and he left the club. In 2005, he signed with Roasso Kumamoto and managed until 2008. In 2012, he became a Chairman at the club. He also managed in 2013 and 2017. In 2017 season, the club finished at the 21st place of 22 clubs and he resigned as a manager and left the club end of the season.

== Managerial statistics ==
Team	From	To	Record				
Team	From	To	G	W	D	L	Win %
Kashiwa Reysol	2002	2002	2	0	0	2	0.00
Kashiwa Reysol	2004	2004	15	3	3	9	20.00
Roasso Kumamoto	2008	2008	42	10	13	19	23.81
Roasso Kumamoto	2013	2013	19	5	6	8	26.32
Roasso Kumamoto	2017	2017	24	5	7	12	20.83
Total			102	23	29	50	22.55
