= Shohei Mishima =

Japanese footballer

Shohei Mishima 三島 頌平
Personal information
- Full name: Shohei Mishima
- Date of birth: November 20, 1995 (age 30)
- Place of birth: Tajimi, Japan
- Height: 1.76 m (5 ft 9 1/2 in)
- Position: Midfielder

Team information
- Current team: Roasso Kumamoto
- Number: 15

Youth career
- 2011–2013: Teikyo University Kani High School

College career
Years	Team	Apps	(Gls)
2014–2017	Chuo University		

Senior career*
Years	Team	Apps	(Gls)
2018–2021	FC Gifu	81	(0)
2022-	Roasso Kumamoto	97	(5)
- * Club domestic league appearances and goals as of 23 August 2026

Shohei Mishima (三島 頌平, Mishima Shōhei; born November 20, 1995) is a Japanese football player for Roasso Kumamoto.

== Career ==
Mishima attended Chuo University despite a strong interest from Shimizu S-Pulse and then joined FC Gifu for 2018 season.

== Career statistics ==
Updated to 29 August 2018.

Appearances and goals by club, season and competition
Club	Season	League			Emperor's Cup		Total	
Club	Season	Division	Apps	Goals	Apps	Goals	Apps	Goals
FC Gifu	2018	J2 League	15	0	1	0	16	0
Career total			15	0	1	0	16	0
