= Makoto Kitano =

Japanese footballer and manager

Makoto Kitano 北野 誠
Personal information
- Full name: Makoto Kitano
- Date of birth: July 17, 1967 (age 59)
- Place of birth: Takamatsu, Kagawa, Japan
- Height: 1.64 m (5 ft 4 1/2 in)
- Position: Forward

Team information
- Current team: Nojima Stella (Manager)

Youth career
- 1983–1985: Teikyo High School

Senior career*
| Years | Team | Apps | (Gls) |
| 1986–1992 | Hitachi | | |
| 1993–1995 | Kyoto Purple Sanga | | |

Managerial career
- 1998–2004: Kyoto Sanga (youth)
- 2005–2008: Roasso Kumamoto (assistant)
- 2009: Roasso Kumamoto
- 2010–2018: Kamatamare Sanuki
- 2019: FC Gifu
- 2020–: Nojima Stella
- * Club domestic league appearances and goals

Makoto Kitano (北野 誠, Kitano Makoto; born July 17, 1967) is a former Japanese football player and manager, currently in charge of Nojima Stella Kanagawa Sagamihara.

== Playing career ==
Kitano was born in Takamatsu on July 17, 1967. After graduating from high school, he joined Hitachi in 1986. In 1993, he moved to Kyoto Purple Sanga. He retired in 1995.

== Coaching career ==
After retirement, Kitano started coaching career at Kyoto Purple Sanga in 1998. He mainly coached youth team until 2004. In 2005, he moved to Regional Leagues club Rosso Kumamoto (later Roasso Kumamoto) and became a coach under manager Tomoyoshi Ikeya. The club was promoted to Japan Football League (JFL) in 2006 and J2 League in 2008. In 2009, he was promoted to manager as Ikeya successor.

In 2010, Kitano moved to Regional Leagues club Kamatamare Sanuki based in his local Kagawa Prefecture. In first season, the club won the champions and was promoted to JFL. In 2013, the club won the 2nd place in JFL and was promoted to J2. However the club results were bad every season in J2 and was finally relegated to J3 League end of 2018 season. He resigned end of 2018 season.

In June 2019, Kitano signed with J2 club FC Gifu and became a manager as Takeshi Oki successor. In February 2020, Kitano went into women's football, being appointed the manager of Nojima Stella Kanagawa Sagamihara.

== Managerial statistics ==
Update; December 31, 2018

| Team | From | To | Record | | | | |
| Team | From | To | G | W | D | L | Win % |
|---|---|---|---|---|---|---|---|
| Roasso Kumamoto | 2009 | 2009 | 51 | 16 | 10 | 25 | 31.37 |
| Kamatamare Sanuki | 2014 | 2018 | 210 | 44 | 64 | 102 | 20.95 |
| FC Gifu | 2019 | present | | | | | |
| Total | | | 261 | 60 | 74 | 127 | 22.99 |
