= Shikoku Kasei Meglio Stadium =

Stadium in Marugame, Japan

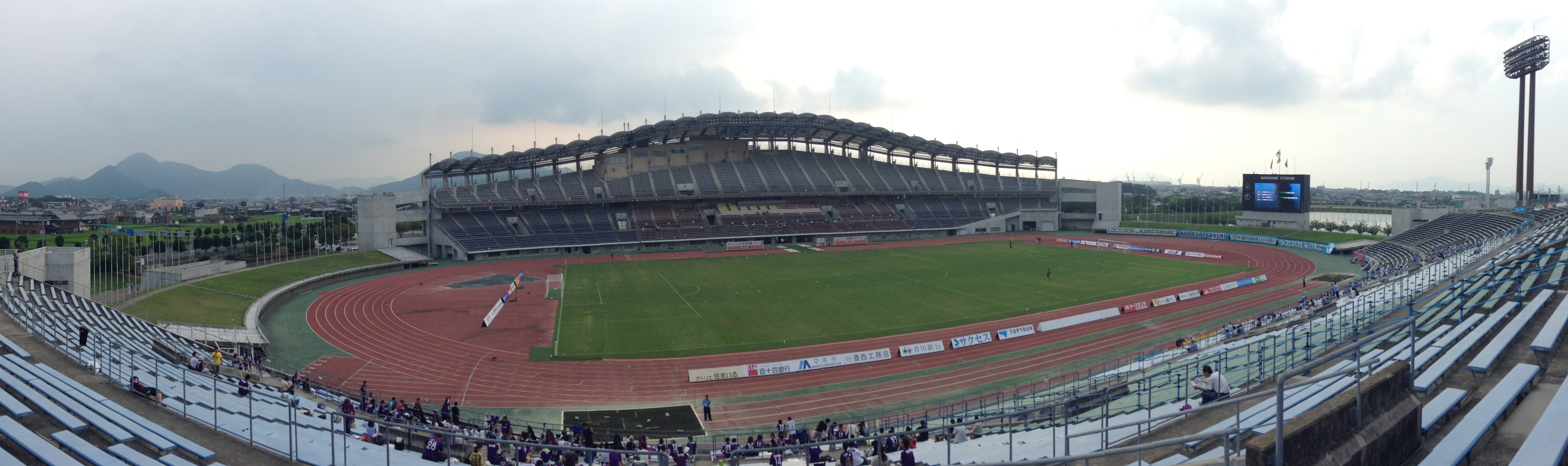
- Interactive map of Shikoku Kasei Meglio Stadium
- Former names: Kagawa Marugame Stadium (1997-2015); Pikara Stadium (2015-2026)
- Location: Marugame, Kagawa, Japan
- Coordinates: 34°15′42″N 133°47′09″E
- Owner: Kagawa Prefecture
- Operator: Yondenko Group
- Capacity: 30,099
- Surface: Grass
- Field size: 105 m × 68 m

Construction
- Groundbreaking: 1995
- Opened: 1997

Tenants
- Kamatamare Sanuki; Kagawa Marugame International Half Marathon

Shikoku Kasei Meglio Stadium is a multi-purpose stadium in Marugame, Kagawa, Japan, formally called Kagawa Marugame Stadium. It is currently used mostly for football matches. The stadium capacity is 30,099 people. The stadium was built in 1997.

It was formerly known as Kagawa Marugame Stadium. Since September 2015 it has been called Shikoku Kasei Meglio Stadium for the naming rights.

== Events ==
On 1 December 2024, Kochi United SC use this stadium for J3/JFL Playoff matches against YSCC Yokohama in first leg, due to renovation Kochi Haruno Athletic Stadium.

== Gallery ==
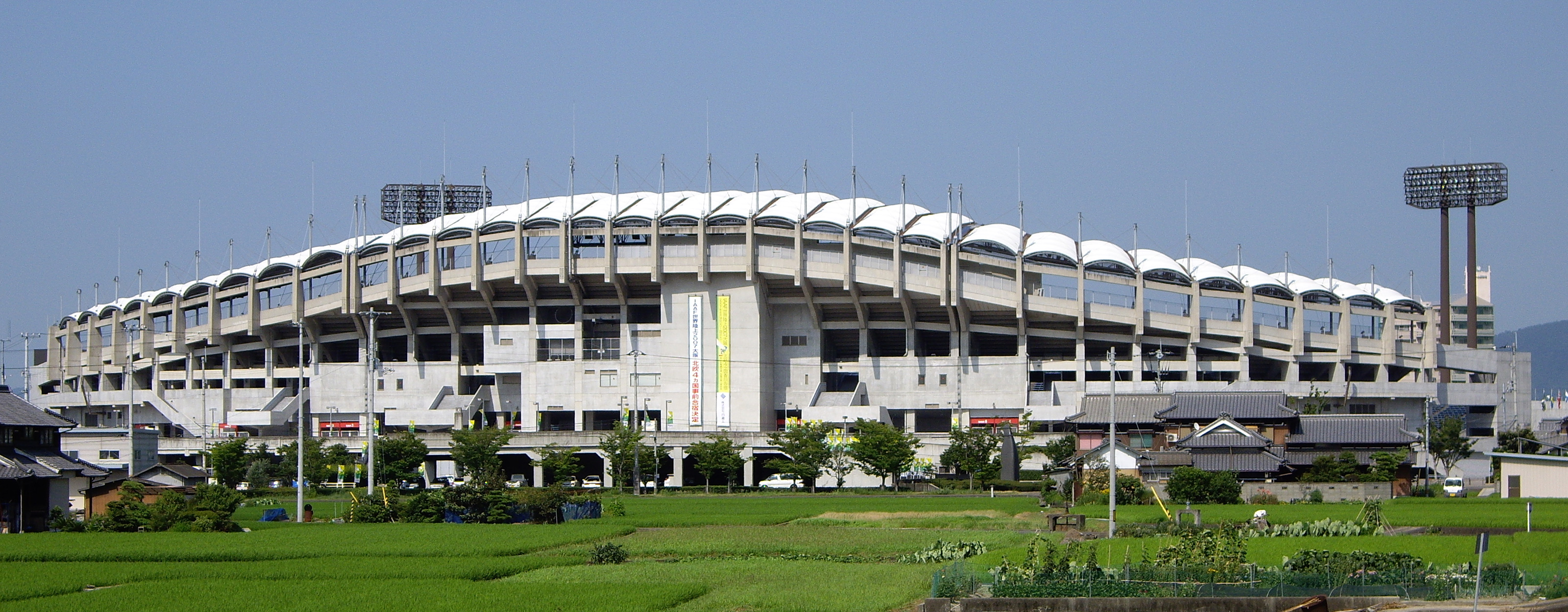

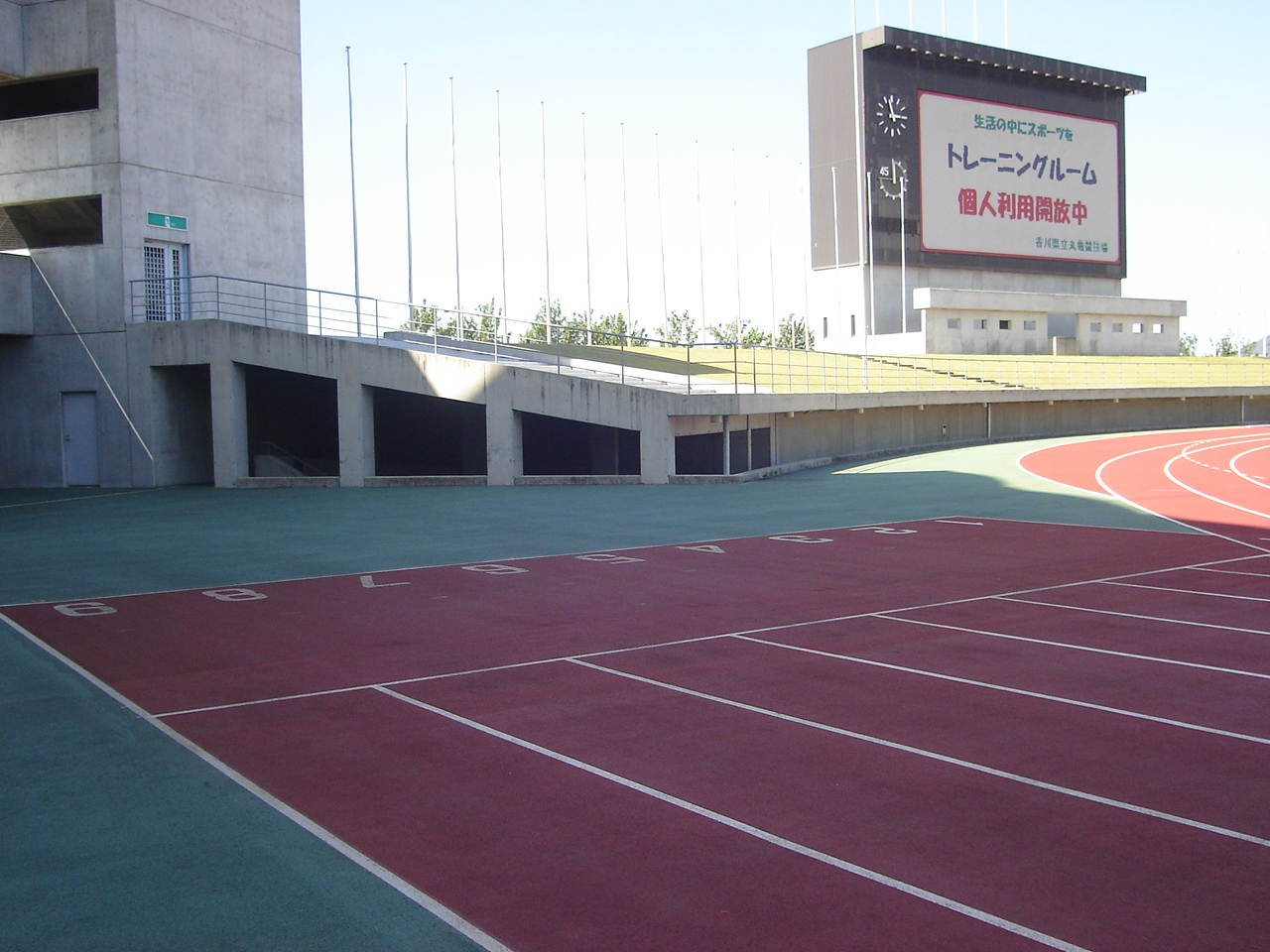

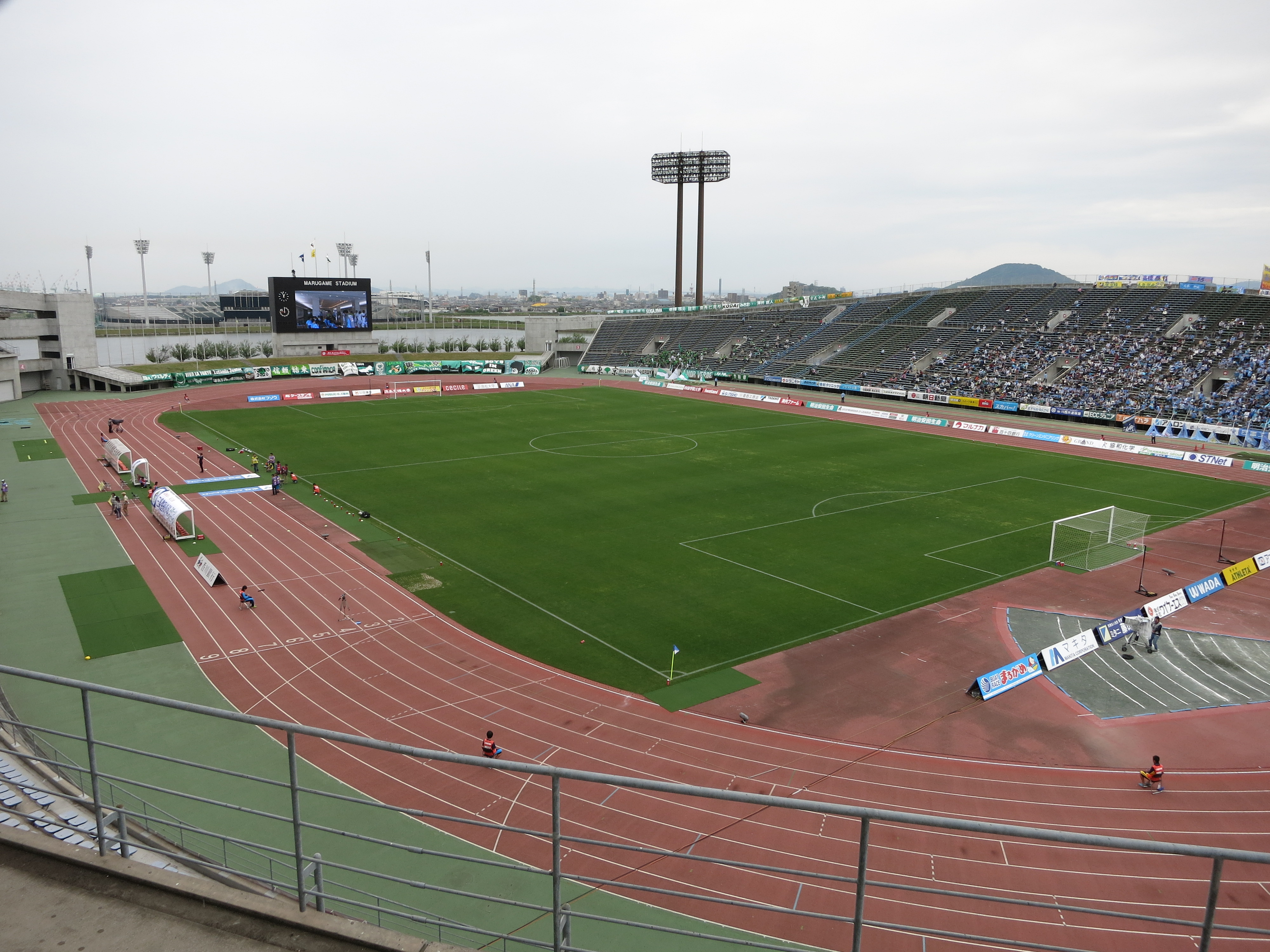

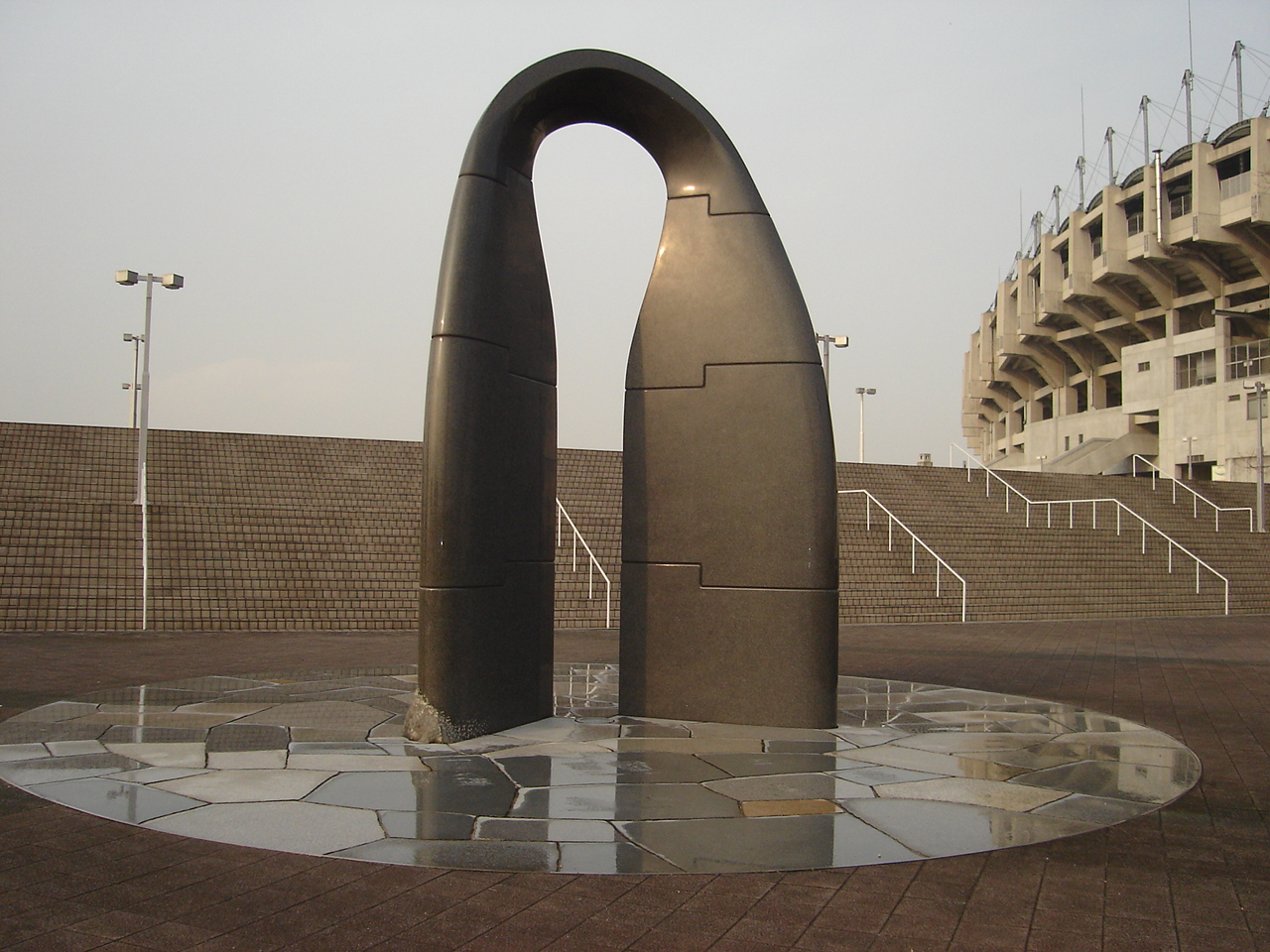
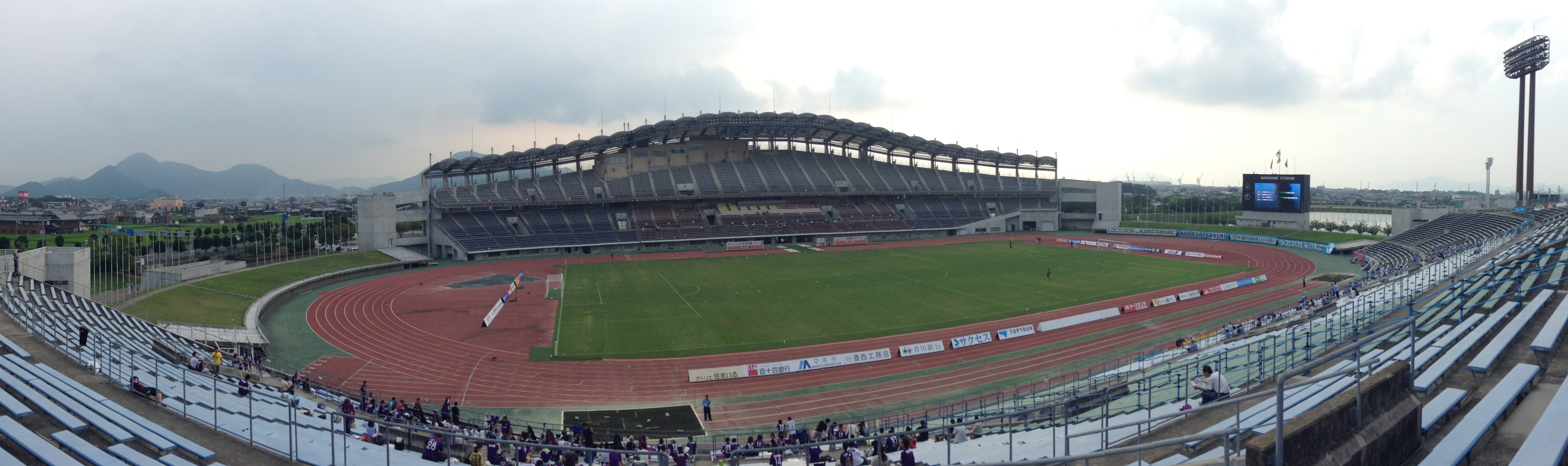
Pikara Stadium in August 2014
