= Roasso Kumamoto =

Japanese football club

Roasso Kumamoto ロアッソ熊本
- Full name: Roasso Kumamoto
- Nickname: Roasso
- Founded: 1969; 57 years ago as NTT Kumamoto SC
- Stadium: Egao Kenkō Stadium; Kumamoto, Kumamoto
- Capacity: 32,000
- Chairman: Tomoyoshi Ikeya
- Manager: Tomohiro Katanosaka
- League: J3 League
- 2025: J2 League, 18th of 20 (relegated)
- Website: roasso-k.com
Home colours	Away colours

Roasso Kumamoto (ロアッソ熊本, Roasso Kumamoto) is a Japanese football club based in Kumamoto, the capital city of Kumamoto Prefecture. The club set to play in J3 League from 2026–27, Japanese third tier of professional league football after relegation from J2 League in 2025.

== Name origin ==
Roasso is a portmanteau of the Italian words rosso and asso, meaning "red ace".

== History ==
=== Early years (1969–2004) ===
The club was founded as the Nippon Telegraph and Telephone Public Corporation (Den-Den Kōsha, current NTT) Kumamoto Soccer Club in 1969. The club was promoted to the Kyushu Soccer League in 1983.

According to the NTT's privatization in 1985, the club was renamed as NTT Kyushu Soccer Club in 1988. During the NTT Kyushu era, the club won five Kyushu Soccer League titles and one All Japan Senior Football Championship. The club changed their name again to NTT Kumamoto Football Club in 2000.

The club changed their name to NTT West Kumamoto Football Club in 2001 as the NTT was divided into NTT East and NTT West. The club was promoted to the JFL in 2000 after finishing 3rd in 24th JFL Promotion Tournament. The NTT relinquished the ownership of the club in 2002 and community oriented Alouette Kumamoto Football Club was born. Alouette is a French word meaning skylark, the bird of Kumamoto Prefecture. The club finished at the 17th in this season and was relegated to the Kyushu Soccer League.

=== Roasso Kumamoto (2005–) ===
The club name was changed again to Rosso Kumamoto in 2005. Rosso means red in Italian. After they won the Kyushu Soccer League and finished at the 3rd in the Regional League play-off tournament, the club was promoted to the JFL.

The club was recently featured in J.League program to introduce the club to followers of the professional league. Rosso's second-place finish in the 2007 JFL season was enough to earn promotion into the J.League (J2 League) for the 2008 season.

The club changed their name to current Roasso Kumamoto in 2008. The previous name Rosso was a registered trademark of another company, so the club could not use it due to a risk of copyright infringement.

After 11 years spent in the J2 League, Kumamoto was relegated to the J3 League on 2018.

After three years at J3 League, Kumamoto returned to J2, after being promoted as the J3 champions in 2021, just a point ahead of Iwate Grulla Morioka in the league table.

In 2022, Kumamoto finished in 4th place with 67 points and advanced to J1 promotion/relegation playoffs after an arguably surprising performance in the 2022 J2 League. Roasso played against the 5th and 4th-placed teams of the J2 season, Oita Trinita and Montedio Yamagata, in matches that ended 1–1 and 2–2, respectively. As the league gave the advantage for the higher-placed team in the league standings to qualify for the next round, Roasso were able to qualify for the play-off finals, despite not winning any match. This time, Kyoto Sanga, as the J1 League team in question, earned the seeding advantage, meaning that Roasso needed to win this match in order to earn promotion. The match ended in a 1–1 draw and Roasso were not promoted for the J1. In 2025, Roasso Kumamoto were relegated to the J3 League for the next season after finishing 18th, with a draw in their final game of the season, ending their three-year stay in the second tier.

== Rivalries ==
The traditional rival of Roasso Kumamoto is Kagoshima United, the prefectural neighbours and former Kyushu Soccer League fellows since 1983 until 2005, except 2001–2002. Matches between the two clubs are labelled Hisatsu derby (肥薩ダービー, "Kumamoto-Kagoshima derby") and generate a lot of interest in both prefectures.

== League & cup record ==
Champions	Runners-up	Third place	Promoted	Relegated

League														J.League Cup	Emperor's Cup
Season	Div.	Tier	Teams	Pos.	P	W (PK)	D	L (PK)	F	A	GD	Pts	Attendance/G	J.League Cup	Emperor's Cup
as Alouette Kumamoto
2002	Japan Football League	3	18	17th	17	3	4	10	16	28	-12	13	672	Not eligible	3rd round
2003	Kyushu Soccer League	4	12	5th	22	11 (3)	-	6 (2)	47	35	12	41	-	Not eligible	1st round
2004	Kyushu Soccer League	4	10	4th	18	10 (0)	-	7 (1)	63	38	5	31	-	Not eligible	3rd round
as Rosso Kumamoto
2005	Kyushu Soccer League	4	10	1st	18	15 (0)	-	1 (2)	45	11	34	47	-	Not eligible	1st round
2006	Japan Football League	3	18	5th	34	20	6	8	64	39	25	66	3,765	Not eligible	3rd round
2007	Japan Football League	3	18	2nd	34	21	6	7	65	34	31	69	3,569	Not eligible	1st round
as Roasso Kumamoto
2008	J2 League	2	15	12th	42	10	13	19	46	72	−26	43	5,279	Not eligible	3rd round
2009	J2 League	2	18	14th	51	12	11	25	66	82	−16	58	6,006	Not eligible	2nd round
2010	J2 League	2	19	7th	36	14	12	10	39	43	−4	54	6,907	Not eligible	3rd round
2011	J2 League	2	20	11th	38	13	12	13	33	44	−11	51	6,928	Not eligible	2nd round
2012	J2 League	2	22	14th	42	15	10	17	40	48	−8	55	5,855	Not eligible	4th round
2013	J2 League	2	22	19th	42	10	13	19	40	70	−30	43	6,228	Not eligible	3rd round
2014	J2 League	2	22	13th	42	13	15	14	45	53	−8	54	7,002	Not eligible	2nd round
2015	J2 League	2	22	13th	42	13	14	15	42	45	−3	53	7,037	Not eligible	3rd round
2016	J2 League	2	22	16th	42	12	10	20	38	53	−15	46	5,543	Not eligible	2nd round
2017	J2 League	2	22	21st	42	9	10	23	36	59	−23	37	6,557	Not eligible	3rd round
2018	J2 League	2	22	21st	42	9	7	26	50	79	−29	34	5,269	Not eligible	2nd round
2019	J3 League	3	18	5th	34	16	9	9	45	39	6	57	5,533	Not eligible	2nd round
2020 †	J3 League	3	18	8th	34	16	6	12	56	47	9	54	1,422	Not eligible	Did not qualify
2021 †	J3 League	3	15	1st	28	15	9	4	39	20	19	54	3,342	Not eligible	2nd round
2022	J2 League	2	22	4th	42	18	13	11	58	48	10	67	4,039	Not eligible	3rd round
2023	J2 League	2	22	14th	42	13	10	19	52	53	−1	49	6,278	Not eligible	Semi-finals
2024	J2 League	2	20	12th	38	13	7	18	53	62	-9	46	9,814	2nd round	2nd round
2025	J2 League	2	20	18th	38	9	10	19	41	57	-16	37	6,700	1st round	3rd round
2026	J3 League	3	40	18th	18	8	2	8	20	20	0	27	5,295	N/A	N/A
2026-27	J3 League	3	20	TBD	38									TBD	TBD

Key

- Pos. = Position in league; P = Games played; W = Games won; D = Games drawn; L = Games lost; F = Goals scored; A = Goals conceded; GD = Goals difference; Pts = Points gained
- W (PK) = Games Won on penalty kicks; L (PK) = Games Lost on penalty kicks
- Attendance/G = Average home league attendance
- † 2020 & 2021 seasons attendances' reduced by COVID-19 worldwide pandemic
- Source: J.League Data Site
- KSL = Kyushu Soccer League (regional league)

== Honours ==
Roasso Kumamoto honours
Honour	No.	Years
Kyushu Soccer League	7	1991, 1994, 1996, 1997, 1999, 2000, 2005
All Japan Senior Football Championship	2	1998, 2005 (shared)
J3 League	1	2021

== League history ==
- Regional (Kyushu): 1983–2000
- Division 3 (JFL): 2001–2002
- Regional (Kyushu): 2003–2005
- Division 3 (JFL): 2006–2007
- Division 2 (J2): 2008–2018
- Division 3 (J3): 2019–2021
- Division 2 (J2): 2022–

== Current squad ==
As of 1 August 2026.

Note: Flags indicate national team as defined under FIFA eligibility rules; some limited exceptions apply. Players may hold more than one non-FIFA nationality.

No.	Pos.	Nation	Player
1	GK	JPN	Shibuki Sato
2	DF	JPN	Kohei Kuroki
3	MF	JPN	Ryotaro Onishi
4	DF	JPN	Rei Yakushida
5	MF	JPN	Keita Kobayashi
7	MF	JPN	Koya Fujii
9	FW	KOR	Bae Jeong-min
10	FW	JPN	Yuto Katori
11	MF	JPN	Rearu Watanabe
13	MF	JPN	Akira Iihoshi
14	FW	JPN	Ora Ishihara
15	MF	JPN	Shohei Mishima
16	GK	JPN	Hiromu Musha
17	MF	JPN	Sota Nagai
18	FW	JPN	Masato Handai

No.	Pos.	Nation	Player
19	FW	JPN	Izumi Miyata (on loan from Yokohama FC)
21	GK	JPN	Haruki Nishimura
22	MF	JPN	Eitarō Matsuda
23	GK	JPN	Yuya Sato
24	DF	PRK	Ri Thae-ha
25	MF	JPN	Kenichi Nasu
26	DF	JPN	Shumpei Toda
27	MF	JPN	Keita Negishi
28	MF	JPN	Yuki Yoshioka
29	MF	JPN	Naoya Mishina (on loan from Kagoshima United FC)
30	DF	JPN	Shia Nagashima
34	MF	JPN	Toya Nakajima
35	DF	JPN	Soma Ito
37	MF	JPN	Hideatsu Ozawa
41	MF	JPN	Yuki Omoto

=== Out on loan ===
Note: Flags indicate national team as defined under FIFA eligibility rules; some limited exceptions apply. Players may hold more than one non-FIFA nationality.

No.	Pos.	Nation	Player
—	FW	JPN	Shun Osaki (at AC Nagano Parceiro)

== Coaching staff ==
Name	Role
Manager	(Japan) Takeshi Oki
Assistant manager	(Japan) Chikara Fujimoto
Coach	(Japan) Yasushi Takahashi (Japan) Shinya Masushima
Goalkeeper coach	(Japan) Ryuichi Ito
Chief trainer	(Japan) Ryoichi Yamamoto
Athletic trainer	(Japan) Shumpei Kawamura
Physiotherapist	(Japan) Keigo Manabe
Physical advisor	(Japan) Fumihiko Nagasaki
Competent	(Japan) Satoshi Sekigami
Side affairs	(Japan) Taichi Nakayama (Japan) Kenta Shioikawa

== Managerial history ==
Manager	Nationality	Tenure	
Manager	Nationality	Start	Finish
Tomoyoshi Ikeya	Japan	1 February 2005	31 January 2009
Makoto Kitano	Japan	1 February 2009	31 January 2010
Takuya Takagi	Japan	1 February 2010	31 January 2013
Yasushi Yoshida	Japan	1 February 2013	10 July 2013
Tomoyoshi Ikeya	Japan	10 July 2013	31 January 2014
Takeshi Ono	Japan	1 February 2014	25 November 2015
Hiroyuki Kiyokawa	Japan	28 November 2015	14 June 2017
Tomoyoshi Ikeya	Japan	14 June 2017	31 January 2018
Hiroki Shibuya	Japan	1 February 2018	31 January 2020
Takeshi Ōki	Japan	1 February 2020	31 December 2026
Tomohiro Katanosaka	Japan	1 January 2026	Current

== Kit and colours ==
=== Colour, sponsors and manufacturers ===
Roasso Kumamoto's club colour is red, representing burning passion and desire for victory.

Season(s)	Main Shirt Sponsor	Collarbone Sponsor		Additional Sponsor(s)				Kit Manufacturer
2018	Hirata	-		Mynavi	Shiratake (1st); Shiratake White (2nd)	Kumamoto Electric Power	-	Puma
2019	Hirata	-		Mynavi	Shiratake (1st); Shiratake White (2nd)	Kumamoto Electric Power	サトウロジック	Puma
2020	Hirata	-		Shiratake (1st); Shiratake White (2nd)	-	-	サトウロジック	Puma
2021	Hirata	-		Shiratake (1st); Shiratake White (2nd)	-	-	サトウロジック	Puma
2022	Hirata	RKKCS	Out-Sourcing Technology	Shiratake (1st); Shiratake White (2nd)	-	-	サトウロジック	Puma
2023	Hirata	RKKCS	Out-Sourcing Technology	Shiratake (1st); Shiratake White (2nd)	Higo Bank	-	-	Puma
2024	Hirata	-		Shiratake (1st); Shiratake White (2nd)	-	Admiral Sportswear		
2025	Hirata	-		Shiratake (1st); Shiratake White (2nd)	-	Admiral Sportswear		

=== Kit evolution ===
Home Kit- 1st
2005-2006	2007	2008	2009-2011	2012-2013
2014	2015	2016	2017	2018
2019	2020	2021	2022	2023
2024	2025 -			

Away Kit - 2nd
2005-2006	2007	2008-2009	2010-2011	2012-2013
2014	2015	2016	2017	2018
2019	2020	2021	2022	2023
2024	2025 -			

Special - 3rd Kit
2018
Summer Limited

== Past seasons ==
- Shota Aizawa (2020)
