= 2024 FC Machida Zelvia season =

Machida Zelvia
2024 season
- Manager: Go Kuroda
- Stadium: Machida GION Stadium
- J1 League: 3rd
- Emperor's Cup: Second round
- J.League Cup: Quarter-finals
- Average home league attendance: 17,610
Home colours	Away colours
- All statistics correct as of 2 March 2024.

The 2024 FC Machida Zelvia season was the club's 36th season in history and the first one in the J1 League, the top flight of Japanese football following becoming J2 League champions in the previous season. As well as the domestic league, they competed in the Emperor's Cup and the J.League Cup.

== Squad ==
=== Season squad ===
Squad no.	Name	Nationality	Date of birth (age at start of season)
Goalkeepers
1	Kosei Tani	(Japan)	22 November 2000 (aged 23)
42	Koki Fukui	(Japan)	4 November 1995 (aged 28)
44	Yoshiaki Arai	(Japan)	27 September 1995 (aged 28)
50	Anton Burns	(Japan)	1 October 2003 (aged 20)
Defenders
3	Gen Shoji (c)	(Japan)	11 December 1992 (aged 31)
5	Ibrahim Drešević	(Kosovo)	24 January 1997 (aged 27)
6	Junya Suzuki	(Japan)	7 January 1996 (aged 28)
14	Jang Min-gyu	(South Korea)	6 March 1999 (aged 24)
19	Yūta Nakayama	(Japan)	16 February 1997 (aged 27)
25	Daiki Sugioka	(Japan)	8 September 1998 (aged 25)
26	Kotaro Hayashi	(Japan)	16 November 2000 (aged 23)
29	Takumi Narasaka	(Japan)	6 July 2002 (aged 21)
33	Henry Hiroki Mochizuki	(Japan)	20 September 2001 (aged 22)
55	Daisuke Matsumoto	(Japan)	10 September 1998 (aged 25)
Midfielders
8	Keiya Sento	(Japan)	29 December 1994 (aged 29)
18	Hokuto Shimoda	(Japan)	7 November 1991 (aged 32)
23	Ryōhei Shirasaki	(Japan)	18 May 1993 (aged 30)
37	Kosei Ashibe	(Japan)	5 April 2001 (aged 22)
38	Tenshiro Takasaki	(Japan)	13 February 2006 (aged 18)
39	Byron Vásquez	(Chile)	16 May 2000 (aged 23)
41	Takuya Yasui	(Japan)	21 November 1998 (aged 25)
45	Kai Shibato	(Japan)	24 November 1995 (aged 28)
46	Ken Higuchi	(Japan)	24 June 2003 (aged 20)
Forwards
7	Yuki Soma	(Japan)	25 February 1997 (aged 26)
9	Shōta Fujio	(Japan)	2 May 2001 (aged 22)
10	Na Sang-ho	(South Korea)	12 August 1996 (aged 27)
11	Erik	(Brazil)	18 July 1994 (aged 29)
15	Mitchell Duke	(Australia)	18 January 1991 (aged 33)
22	Kazuki Fujimoto	(Japan)	29 July 1998 (aged 25)
30	Yuki Nakashima	(Japan)	16 June 1984 (aged 39)
47	Shunta Araki	(Japan)	24 October 1999 (aged 24)
90	Oh Se-hun	(South Korea)	15 January 1999 (aged 25)

Last updated: 19 August 2024.
Source: FC Machida Zelvia website

== Transfers ==
=== Arrivals ===
Date	Position	Player	From	Type	Source
21 April 2023	MF	(Japan) Tenshiro Takasaki	(Japan) Quon Football Development	Full	
10 May 2023	DF	(Japan) Henry Heroki Mochizuki	(Japan) Kokushikan University	Full	
8 September 2023	FW	(Japan) Kosei Ashibe	(Japan) Kanto Gakuin University	Full	
17 December 2023	DF	(Japan) Yoshitaka Aoki	(Japan) ReinMeer Aomori	Loan return	
19 December 2023	FW	(Japan) Kazuki Fujimoto	(Japan) Oita Trinita	Full	
25 December 2023	DF	(Japan) Gen Shoji	(Japan) Kashima Antlers	Full	
4 January 2024	FW	(South Korea) Na Sang-ho	(South Korea) FC Seoul	Full	
5 January 2024	FW	(South Korea) Oh Se-hun	(Japan) Shimizu S-Pulse	Loan	
6 January 2024	GK	(Japan) Louis Yamaguchi	(Japan) Mito Hollyhock	Full	
6 January 2024	DF	(Japan) Kotaro Hayashi	(Japan) Yokohama FC	Full	
9 January 2024	MF	(Japan) Atsushi Kurokawa	(Japan) Omiya Ardija	Loan return	
9 January 2024	MF	(Japan) Kai Shibato	(Japan) Urawa Red Diamonds	Loan	
10 January 2024	MF	(Japan) Ken Higuchi	(Japan) Okinawa SV	Loan return	
10 January 2024	FW	(Japan) Shōta Fujio	(Japan) Cerezo Osaka	Full	
11 January 2024	MF	(Japan) Keiya Sento	(Japan) Kashiwa Reysol	Full	
11 January 2024	DF	(Japan) Takumi Narasaka	(Japan) Kamatamare Sanuki	Loan return	
12 January 2024	GK	(Japan) Kosei Tani	(Japan) Gamba Osaka	Loan	
12 January 2024	FW	(Japan) Shunta Araki	(Japan) Sagan Tosu	Full	
18 January 2024	DF	(Kosovo) Ibrahim Drešević	(Turkey) Fatih Karagümrük	Full	
12 April 2024	FW	(Japan) Kanji Kuwayama	(Japan) Tokai University	DSP	
16 July 2024	DF	(Japan) Daiki Sugioka	(Japan) Shonan Bellmare	Loan	
23 July 2024	FW	(Japan) Yuki Soma	(Japan) Nagoya Grampus	Full	
31 July 2024	MF	(Japan) Ryōhei Shirasaki	(Japan) Shimizu S-Pulse	Loan	
14 August 2024	DF	(Japan) Yūta Nakayama	(England) Huddersfield Town	Full	
16 August 2024	GK	(Japan) Yoshiaki Arai	(Japan) Oita Trinita	Full	

=== Departures ===
Date	Position	Player	To	Type	Source
3 October 2023	DF	(Japan) Kosuke Ota		Retired	
21 November 2023	GK	(Serbia) Nedeljko Stojišić		Released	
8 December 2023	FW	(Japan) Yuya Takazawa	(Japan) Thespa Gunma	Full	
4 January 2024	DF	(Japan) Shohei Takahashi	(Japan) Matsumoto Yamaga	Full	
5 January 2024	MF	(Japan) Renji Matsui	(Japan) Kawasaki Frontale	Loan return	
5 January 2024	DF	(Japan) Yudai Fujiwara	(Japan) Urawa Red Diamonds	Loan return	
6 January 2024	MF	(Japan) Sho Fuseya	(Japan) Kataller Toyama	Loan	
6 January 2024	DF	(Japan) Hijiri Onaga	(Japan) Tokyo Verdy	Full	
8 January 2024	FW	(Japan) Daiki Sato	(Japan) Blaublitz Akita	Loan	
9 January 2024	GK	(Japan) William Popp	(Japan) Yokohama F. Marinos	Full	
11 January 2024	DF	(Japan) Mizuki Uchida	(Japan) Kamatamare Sanuki	Loan	
28 February 2024	FW	(Brazil) Ademilson	(Brazil) Avaí FC	Full	
4 July 2024	DF	(Japan) Kai Miki	(Japan) SC Sagamihara	Loan	
7 July 2024	MF	(Japan) Yohei Okuyama	(Japan) Renofa Yamaguchi	Loan	
9 July 2024	FW	(Japan) Yu Hirakawa	(England) Bristol City	Loan	
16 July 2024	MF	(Japan) Shuto Inaba	(Japan) Kagoshima United	Loan	
19 July 2024	MF	(Japan) Zento Uno	(Japan) Shimizu S-Pulse	Loan	
23 July 2024	MF	(Japan) Daigo Takahashi	(Japan) Oita Trinita	Loan	
23 July 2024	FW	(Japan) Takaya Numata	(Japan) Kagoshima United	Loan	
23 July 2024	DF	(Japan) Jurato Ikeda	(Japan) Avispa Fukuoka	Loan	
30 July 2024	DF	(Japan) Yoshitaka Aoki	(Japan) V-Varen Nagasaki	Loan	
14 August 2024	GK	(Japan) Louis Yamaguchi	(Japan) Kawasaki Frontale	Loan	
19 August 2024	DF	(Japan) Masayuki Okuyama	(Japan) Vegalta Sendai	Loan	

== Pre-season and friendlies ==
27 January 2024 Friendly	Machida Zelvia	0–0	FC Ryukyu	Gushikawa Sports Park Multi-sport Stadium
		Report
Note: 30 minutes

27 January 2024 Friendly	Machida Zelvia	2–1	FC Ryukyu	Gushikawa Sports Park Multi-sport Stadium
		Report
Note: 30 minutes

27 January 2024 Friendly	Machida Zelvia	0–0	FC Ryukyu	Gushikawa Sports Park Multi-sport Stadium
		Report
Note: 30 minutes

28 January 2024 Friendly	Machida Zelvia	2–0	Hokkaido Consadole Sapporo	Gushikawa Sports Park Multi-sport Stadium
		Report
Note: 45 minutes

28 January 2024 Friendly	Machida Zelvia	0–0	Hokkaido Consadole Sapporo	Gushikawa Sports Park Multi-sport Stadium
		Report
Note: 45 minutes

28 January 2024 Friendly	Machida Zelvia	0–0	Hokkaido Consadole Sapporo	Gushikawa Sports Park Multi-sport Stadium
		Report
Note: 30 minutes

31 July 2024 Friendly	Machida Zelvia	0–2	(France) Reims	Machida
19:00 UTC+9		Report	Diakité 29'; Salama 77'	Stadium: Machida GION Stadium

== Competitions ==
=== Overall record ===
Competition	First match	Last match	Starting round	Record							
Competition	First match	Last match	Starting round	Pld	W	D	L	GF	GA	GD	Win %
J1 League	24 February 2024		Matchday 1	38	19	9	10	54	34	+20	50.00
Emperor's Cup	12 June 2024	12 June 2024	Second round	1	0	1	0	1	1	+0	0.00
J.League Cup	16 April 2024	8 September 2024	Round 1	4	3	0	1	6	6	+0	75.00
Total				43	22	10	11	61	41	+20	51.16

Source: Competitions

=== J1 League ===
==== Table ====
Pos	Team	Pld	W	D	L	GF	GA	GD	Pts	Qualification or relegation
1	Vissel Kobe (C)	38	21	9	8	61	36	+25	72	Qualification for the AFC Champions League Elite league stage (Note: Since the winners of the 2024 Emperor's Cup, Vissel Kobe, had already qualified for the Champions League Elite, the spot given to the Emperor's Cup winners (Champions League Elite) was passed to the third-placed team. Consequently, the spot given to the third-placed team (Champions League Two) was passed to the fourth-placed team.)
2	Sanfrecce Hiroshima	38	19	11	8	72	43	+29	68	Qualification for the AFC Champions League Elite league stage
3	Machida Zelvia	38	19	9	10	54	34	+20	66	Qualification for the AFC Champions League Elite league stage
4	Gamba Osaka	38	18	12	8	49	35	+14	66	Qualification for the AFC Champions League Two group stage
5	Kashima Antlers	38	18	11	9	60	41	+19	65	

Source: J1 League, J.League Data Site
Rules for classification: 1) Points; 2) Goal difference; 3) Goals scored; 4) Head-to-head points; 5) Head-to-head goal difference; 6) Head-to-head goals scored; 7) Fewer disciplinary points.
(C) Champions

==== Results summary ====
Overall								Home						Away					
Pld	W	D	L	GF	GA	GD	Pts	W	D	L	GF	GA	GD	W	D	L	GF	GA	GD
38	19	9	10	54	34	+20	66	9	4	6	30	19	+11	10	5	4	24	15	+9

Source: Worldfootball

==== Results by round ====
Round	1	2	3	4	5	6	7	8	9	10	11	12	13	14	15	16	17	18	19	20	21	22	23	24	25	26	27	28	29	30	31	32	33	34	35	36	37	38
Ground	H	A	H	A	H	H	A	H	A	A	H	A	A	H	H	A	H	A	H	A	A	H	A	H	A	H	H	A	H	A	H	A	H	A	A	H	H	A
Result/L	D	W	W	W	W	L	W	L	W	L	W	W	D	W	W	W	L	W	D	D	W	W	W	L	D	L	W	D	D	W	D	L	L	D	L	W	W	L
Position	9	5	3	1	1	1	1	3	1	2	1	1	2	2	1	1	1	1	1	1	1	1	1	1	1	1	1	1	2	1	2	3	3	3	3	3	3	3

Source: Worldfootball
A = Away; H = Home; W = Win; D = Draw; L = Loss

==== Matches ====
The matches were unveiled on 23 January.

24 February 1	Machida Zelvia	1–1	Gamba Osaka	Machida
15:03 UTC+9	Suzuki 17' (pen.); Sento (yellow card) 10' (yellow-red card) 60'; Tani (yellow card) 90+2'	Report	Usami 84'	Stadium: Machida GION Stadium; Attendance: 13,506; Referee: Hayato Shimizu

2 March 2	Nagoya Grampus	0–1	Machida Zelvia	Toyota
14:03 UTC+9	Chang-Rae Ha (yellow card) 46'; Nogami (yellow card) 54'; Masui (yellow card) 79'; Yonemoto (red card) 87'	Report	Fujio 21'; Jang Min-gyu (yellow card) 39'; Drešević (yellow card) 55'; Shibato (yellow card) 82'	Stadium: Toyota Stadium; Attendance: 30,415; Referee: Yoshiro Imamura

9 March 3	Machida Zelvia	1–0	Kashima Antlers	Machida
14:03 UTC+9	Hirakawa 13'; Vásquez (yellow card) 22'; Shibato (yellow card) 27'	Report	Nono (yellow card) 60'	Stadium: Machida GION Stadium; Attendance: 11,901; Referee: Ismail Elfath (United States)

16 March 4	Hokkaido Consadole Sapporo	1–2	Machida Zelvia	Sapporo
14:03 UTC+9	Hara 84'	Report	Fujio 53'; Drešević 66'	Stadium: Sapporo Dome; Attendance: 14,607; Referee: Yusuke Araki

30 March 5	Machida Zelvia	3–1	Sagan Tosu	Machida
15:03 UTC+9	Fujimoto 5'; Oh Se-hun 54', 57'	Report	Ryan 34'	Stadium: Machida GION Stadium; Attendance: 7,062; Referee: Jumpei Iida

3 April 6	Machida Zelvia	1–2	Sanfrecce Hiroshima	Machida
19:03 UTC+9	Ohashi 82' (o.g.)	Report	Ohashi 31'; Mitsuta 55' (pen.)	Stadium: Machida GION Stadium; Attendance: 5,240; Referee: Koei Koya

7 April 7	Kawasaki Frontale	0–1	Machida Zelvia	Kawasaki
15:03 UTC+9		Report	Fujio 32'; Tani (red card) 71'	Stadium: Uvance Todoroki Stadium by Fujitsu; Attendance: 22,008; Referee: Yudai Yamamoto

13 April 8	Machida Zelvia	1–2	Vissel Kobe	Tokyo
15:03 UTC+9	Drešević 90+6'	Report	Yamauchi 45'; Muto 89'	Stadium: Japan National Stadium; Attendance: 39,080; Referee: Futoshi Nakamura

21 April 9	FC Tokyo	1–2	Machida Zelvia	Tokyo
15:03 UTC+9	Ogashiwa 21' (pen.)	Report	Na S.H. 14'; Oh S.H. 25'	Stadium: Ajinomoto Stadium; Attendance: 30,811; Referee: Shu Kawamata

27 April 10	Júbilo Iwata	2–0	Machida Zelvia	Iwata
14:03 UTC+9	Matsubara 46'; Germain 70'	Report		Stadium: Yamaha Stadium; Attendance: 12,982; Referee: Hayato Shimizu

3 May 11	Machida Zelvia	2–0	Kashiwa Reysol	Machida
15:03 UTC+9	Oh S.H. 9'; Araki 69'	Report		Stadium: Machida GION Stadium; Attendance: 12,064; Referee: Yoshiro Imamura

6 May 12	Kyoto Sanga	0–3	Machida Zelvia	Kameoka
14:03 UTC+9		Report	Oh S.H. 22'; Na S.H. 64'; Duke 75'	Stadium: Sanga Stadium by Kyocera; Attendance: 11,191; Referee: Yoshimi Yamashita

11 May 13	Shonan Bellmare	0–0	Machida Zelvia	Hiratsuka
15:03 UTC+9		Report		Stadium: Lemon Gas Stadium Hiratsuka; Attendance: 11,519; Referee: Atsushi Kamimura

15 May 14	Machida Zelvia	2–1	Cerezo Osaka	Machida
19:03 UTC+9	Oh S.H. 70'; Duke 90+3'	Report	Léo Ceará 84' (pen.)	Stadium: Machida GION Stadium; Attendance: 6,546; Referee: Yusuke Araki

19 May 15	Machida Zelvia	5–0	Tokyo Verdy	Machida
14:03 UTC+9	Miyahara 11' (o.g.); Fujio 29', 60'; Shibato 80'; Erik 90+3'	Report		Stadium: Machida GION Stadium; Attendance: 12,027; Referee: Futoshi Nakamura

26 May 16	Urawa Red Diamonds	1–2	Machida Zelvia	Saitama
16:03 UTC+9	Ito 54'	Report	Hirakawa 52'; Shimoda 90+6' (pen.)	Stadium: Saitama Stadium 2002; Attendance: 39,460; Referee: Sascha Stegemann

1 June 17	Machida Zelvia	1–3	Albirex Niigata	Machida
15:03 UTC+9	Fujio 27'	Report	Komi 24'; Fujiwara 45'; Jang M.G 52' (o.g.)	Stadium: Machida GION Stadium; Attendance: 10,411; Referee: Shu Kawamata

15 June 18	Yokohama F. Marinos	1–3	Machida Zelvia	Yokohama
16:03 UTC+9	Miyaichi 14'	Report	Shoji 43'; Fujio 57'; Shimoda 61'	Stadium: Nissan Stadium; Attendance: 37,396; Referee: Ryo Tanimoto

22 June 19	Machida Zelvia	0–0	Avispa Fukuoka	Machida
15:03 UTC+9		Report		Stadium: Machida GION Stadium; Attendance: 9,092; Referee: Futoshi Nakamura

26 June 20	Vissel Kobe	0–0	Machida Zelvia	Kobe
19:03 UTC+9		Report		Stadium: Noevir Stadium Kobe; Attendance: 16,517; Referee: Yuichi Nishimura

30 June 21	Gamba Osaka	1–3	Machida Zelvia	Osaka
18:03 UTC+9	Welton 9'; Handa (yellow card) 31' (yellow-red card) 33'	Report	Duke 45+2'; Fujio 61' (pen.); Sento 69'	Stadium: Panasonic Stadium Suita; Attendance: 26,953; Referee: Takuto Okabe

6 July 22	Machida Zelvia	1–0	Nagoya Grampus	Machida
18:03 UTC+9	Shiomda 30'	Report		Stadium: Machida GION Stadium; Attendance: 9,117; Referee: Atsushi Kamimura

14 July 23	Tokyo Verdy	0–1	Machida Zelvia	Tokyo
18:03 UTC+9		Report	Taniguchi 6' (o.g.)	Stadium: Ajinomoto Stadium; Attendance: 22,480; Referee: Akihiko Ikeuchi

20 July 24	Machida Zelvia	1–2	Yokohama F. Marinos	Tokyo
18:03 UTC+9	Duke 85'	Report	Anderson Lopes 33' (pen.); Amano 43'	Stadium: Japan National Stadium; Attendance: 46,401; Referee: Takafumi Mikuriya

7 August 25	Cerezo Osaka	0–0	Machida Zelvia	Osaka
19:03 UTC+9		Report		Stadium: Yodoko Sakura Stadium; Attendance: 15,232; Referee: Koei Koya

11 August 26	Machida Zelvia	0–1	Shonan Bellmare	Machida
18:03 UTC+9		Report	Ikeda 48'	Stadium: Machida GION Stadium; Attendance: 10,767; Referee: Masuya Ueda

17 August 27	Machida Zelvia	4–0	Júbilo Iwata	Machida
18:06 UTC+9	Nakayama 4'; Erik 29'; Fujimoto 45+2'; Fujio 58' (pen.)	Report		Stadium: Machida GION Stadium; Attendance: 12,206; Referee: Koji Takasaki

25 August 28	Albirex Niigata	0–0	Machida Zelvia	Niigata
19:03 UTC+9		Report		Stadium: Denka Big Swan Stadium; Attendance: 18,588; Referee: Takafumi Mikuriya

31 August 29	Machida Zelvia	2–2	Urawa Red Diamonds	Tokyo
18:03 UTC+9	Oh S.H. 49'; Erik 90+8'	Report	Sekine 37'; Thiago Santana 87'	Stadium: Japan National Stadium; Attendance: 48,887; Referee: Hiroyuki Kimura

14 September 30	Avispa Fukuoka	0–3	Machida Zelvia	Fukuoka
18:03 UTC+9		Report	Fujimoto 51'; Tashiro 56' (o.g.); Na S.H. 69'	Stadium: Best Denki Stadium; Attendance: 9,848; Referee: Yudai Yamamoto

21 September 31	Machida Zelvia	0–0	Hokkaido Consadole Sapporo	Machida
19:03 UTC+9		Report		Stadium: Machida GION Stadium; Attendance: 10,596; Referee: Yoshimi Yamashita

28 September 32	Sanfrecce Hiroshima	2–0	Machida Zelvia	Hiroshima
19:03 UTC+9	Paciência 3'; Kato 23'	Report		Stadium: Edion Peace Wing Hiroshima; Attendance: 26,655; Referee: Yusuke Araki

5 October 33	Machida Zelvia	1–4	Kawasaki Frontale	Machida
15:03 UTC+9	Nakashima 13'	Report	Miura 28'; Yamada 38'; Erison 50' (pen.); Marcinho 71'	Stadium: Machida GION Stadium; Attendance: 12,753; Referee: Yoshiro Imamura

19 October 34	Kashiwa Reysol	1–1	Machida Zelvia	Kashiwa
14:03 UTC+9	Hosoya 63'	Report	Shimoda 90+5'	Stadium: Sankyo Frontier Kashiwa Stadium; Attendance: 13,895; Referee: Koei Koya

3 November 35	Sagan Tosu	2–1	Machida Zelvia	Tosu
14:03 UTC+9	Suzuki 20'; Terayama 84'	Report	Drešević 66'	Stadium: Ekimae Real Estate Stadium; Attendance: 8,731; Referee: Hayato Shimizu

9 November 36	Machida Zelvia	3–0	FC Tokyo	Tokyo
14:03 UTC+9	Shirasaki 15'; Oh S.H. 49'; Soma 79'	Report		Stadium: Japan National Stadium; Attendance: 45,288; Referee: Yuichi Nishimura

30 November 37	Machida Zelvia	1–0	Kyoto Sanga	Machida
14:03 UTC+9	Ota 67' (o.g.)	Report		Stadium: Machida GION Stadium; Attendance: 11,541; Referee: Futoshi Nakamura

8 December 38	Kashima Antlers	3–1	Machida Zelvia	Kashima
14:03 UTC+9	Morooka 5'; Higuchi 16'; Suzuki 45+2'	Report	Shimoda 23'	Stadium: Kashima Soccer Stadium; Attendance: 32,840; Referee: Hiroyuki Kimura

=== Emperor's Cup ===
12 June Second round	Machida Zelvia	1–1 (a.e.t.) (2–4 p)	University of Tsukuba	Machida
18:30	Yasui 22'	Report	Uchino 90+1'	Stadium: Machida Gion Stadium; Attendance: 1,948; Referee: Koichiro Fukushima
	Penalties
	Erik (penalty scored); Suzuki (penalty scored); Inaba (penalty missed); Araki (penalty missed)		(penalty scored) Uchino; (penalty scored) Kato; (penalty scored) Okita; (penalty missed) Kobayashi; (penalty scored) Sumi

=== J.League Cup ===
The 2024 J.League Cup was expanded so that all 60 J.League clubs would participate. This was Machida Zelvia's first season competing in the competition.

16 April First round – Match 2	Giravanz Kitakyushu	1–2	Machida Zelvia	Kitakyushu
19:03	Wakaya 54'	Report	Vásquez 49'; Yasui 79'	Stadium: Mikuni World Stadium Kitakyushu; Attendance: 4,221; Referee: Takuto Okabe

22 May First round – Match 3	Machida Zelvia	2–0 (4–1 agg.)	Kashima Antlers	Machida
19:03	Duke 20', 36'	Report		Stadium: Machida GION Stadium; Attendance: 4,537; Referee: Takuto Okabe

==== Quarter-finals ====
4 September Leg 1	Albirex Niigata	5–0	Machida Zelvia	Niigata
19:03	Nagakura 16', 49', 87', 90+5'; Ono 42'	Report	Fujio (red card) 32'	Stadium: Denka Big Swan Stadium; Attendance: 9,130; Referee: Akihiko Ikeuchi

8 September 2024 Leg 2	Machida Zelvia	2–0 (2–5 agg.)	Albirex Niigata	Machida
18:03	Nakashima 41'; Shimoda 45'	Report		Stadium: Machida GION Stadium; Attendance: 6,726; Referee: Koichiro Fukushima

== Statistics ==
=== Goalscorers ===
The list is sorted by shirt number when total goals are equal.

Rnk	Pos	No.	Player	J1	EC	JLC	Total
1	FW	9	(Japan) Shōta Fujio	9	0	0	9
2	FW	90	(South Korea) Oh Se-hun	8	0	0	8
3	FW	15	(Australia) Mitchell Duke	4	0	2	6
3	MF	18	(Japan) Hokuto Shimoda	5	0	1	6
5	–	–	Own goal	5	0	0	5
6	DF	5	(Kosovo) Ibrahim Drešević	3	0	0	3
6	FW	10	(South Korea) Na Sang-ho	3	0	0	3
6	FW	11	(Brazil) Erik	3	0	0	3
6	FW	22	(Japan) Kazuki Fujimoto	3	0	0	3
10	FW	7	(Japan) Yu Hirakawa	2	0	0	2
10	FW	30	(Japan) Yuki Nakashima	1	0	1	2
10	MF	41	(Japan) Takuya Yasui	0	1	1	2
13	DF	3	(Japan) Gen Shoji	1	0	0	1
13	DF	6	(Japan) Junya Suzuki	1	0	0	1
13	FW	7	(Japan) Yuki Soma	1	0	0	1
13	MF	8	(Japan) Keiya Sento	1	0	0	1
13	DF	19	(Japan) Yūta Nakayama	1	0	0	1
13	MF	23	(Japan) Ryōhei Shirasaki	1	0	0	1
13	MF	39	(Chile) Byron Vásquez	0	0	1	1
13	MF	45	(Japan) Kai Shibato	1	0	0	1
13	FW	47	(Japan) Shunta Araki	1	0	0	1
TOTALS				54	1	6	61

Source: jleague.co

=== Clean sheets ===
The list is sorted by shirt number when total clean sheets are equal.

Rnk	No.	Player	J1	EC	JLC	Total
1	1	(Japan) Kosei Tani	17	0	0	17
2	42	(Japan) Koki Fukui	0	0	2	2
TOTALS			17	0	2	19

Source: fbref.com
