= 2025 FC Machida Zelvia season =

Machida Zelvia
2025 season
- Manager: Go Kuroda
- Stadium: Machida GION Stadium
- J1 League: 7th
- Emperor's Cup: Winners
- J.League Cup: First round (Match 3)
- Average home league attendance: 14,018
Home colours	Away colours
- All statistics correct as of 2 March 2025.

The 2025 FC Machida Zelvia season was the club's 37th season in history and the first one in the J1 League, the top flight of Japanese football following becoming J2 League champions in the previous season. As well as the domestic league, they competed in the Emperor's Cup and the J.League Cup.

== Squad ==
=== Season squad ===
Squad no.	Name	Nationality	Date of birth	Previous team
Goalkeepers
1	Kosei Tani	(Japan)	22 November 2000 (age 25)	(Belgium) Dender
13	Tatsuya Morita	(Japan)	3 August 1990 (age 35)	(Japan) Kashiwa Reysol
17	Kaung Zan Mara	(Japan) (Myanmar)	11 June 2002 (age 23)	(Japan) Sanno University
44	Yoshiaki Arai	(Japan)	27 September 1995 (age 30)	(Japan) Oita Trinita
55	Anton Burns	(Japan) (United States)	1 October 2003 (age 22)	(Japan) Taisei High School
Defenders
2	Tomoki Imai	(Japan)	29 November 1990 (age 35)	(Australia) Western United
3	Gen Shoji (c)	(Japan)	11 December 1992 (age 33)	(Japan) Kashima Antlers
5	Ibrahim Drešević	(Kosovo) (Sweden)	24 January 1997 (age 29)	(Turkey) Fatih Karagümrük
6	Henry Hiroki Mochizuki	(Japan) (Nigeria)	20 September 2001 (age 24)	(Japan) Kokushikan University
19	Yūta Nakayama	(Japan)	16 February 1997 (age 29)	(England) Huddersfield Town
26	Kotaro Hayashi	(Japan)	16 November 2000 (age 25)	(Japan) Yokohama FC
50	Daihachi Okamura	(Japan)	15 February 1997 (age 29)	(Japan) Hokkaido Consadole Sapporo
77	Takumi Narasaka	(Japan)	6 July 2002 (age 23)	(Japan) Kamatamare Sanuki
88	Hotaka Nakamura	(Japan)	12 August 1997 (age 28)	(Japan) FC Tokyo
Midfielders
4	Ryuho Kikuchi	(Japan)	9 December 1996 (age 29)	(Japan) Vissel Kobe
8	Keiya Sento	(Japan)	29 December 1994 (age 31)	(Japan) Kashiwa Reysol
11	Asahi Masuyama	(Japan)	29 January 1997 (age 29)	(Japan) V-Varen Nagasaki
16	Hiroyuki Mae	(Japan)	1 August 1995 (age 30)	(Japan) Avispa Fukuoka
18	Hokuto Shimoda	(Japan)	7 November 1991 (age 34)	(Japan) Oita Trinita
23	Ryōhei Shirasaki	(Japan)	18 May 1993 (age 32)	(Japan) Shimizu S-Pulse
28	Cha Je-hoon	(South Korea)	3 May 2006 (age 19)	(South Korea) Jungkyung High School
31	Neta Lavi	(Israel) (Portugal)	25 August 1996 (age 29)	(Japan) Gamba Osaka
38	Tenshiro Takasaki	(Japan)	13 February 2006 (age 20)	(Japan) Quon Football Academy
39	Byron Vásquez	(Chile) (Japan)	16 May 2000 (age 25)	(Japan) Tokyo Verdy
46	Ken Higuchi	(Japan)	24 June 2003 (age 22)	(Japan) Okinawa SV
Forwards
7	Yuki Soma	(Japan)	25 February 1997 (age 29)	(Portugal) Casa Pia
9	Shōta Fujio	(Japan)	2 May 2001 (age 24)	(Japan) Cerezo Osaka
10	Na Sang-ho	(South Korea)	12 August 1996 (age 29)	(South Korea) FC Seoul
15	Mitchell Duke	(Australia)	18 January 1991 (age 35)	(Japan) Fagiano Okayama
20	Takuma Nishimura	(Japan)	22 October 1996 (age 29)	(Japan) Yokohama F. Marinos
22	Takaya Numata	(Japan)	19 April 1999 (age 26)	(Japan) Kagoshima United FC
30	Yuki Nakashima	(Japan)	16 June 1984 (age 41)	(Japan) Montedio Yamagata
49	Kanji Kuwayama	(Japan)	28 November 2002 (age 23)	(Japan) Tokai University
90	Oh Se-hun	(South Korea)	15 January 1999 (age 27)	(Japan) Shimizu S-Pulse
Players loaned out
11	Erik	(Brazil)	18 July 1994 (age 31)	(China) Changchun Yatai
37	Kosei Ashibe	(Japan)	5 April 2001 (age 24)	(Japan) Kanto Gakuin University
99	Daigo Takahashi	(Japan)	17 April 1999 (age 26)	(Japan) Oita Trinita

Last updated: 19 August 2024.
Source: FC Machida Zelvia website

== Transfers ==
=== Pre-season ===
==== In ====
Transfers in

Position	Player	Transferred to	Fee
GK	(Japan) (Myanmar) Kaung Zan Mara	(Japan) Sanno University	Free
GK	(Japan) Tatsuya Morita	(Japan) Kashiwa Reysol	Free
DF	(Japan) Hotaka Nakamura	(Japan) FC Tokyo	Free
DF	(Japan) Daihachi Okamura	(Japan) Hokkaido Consadole Sapporo	Free
MF	(Japan) Hiroyuki Mae	(Japan) Avispa Fukuoka	Free
MF	(Japan) Ryuho Kikuchi	(Japan) Vissel Kobe	Free
MF	(South Korea) Cha Je-hoon	(South Korea) Jungkyung High School	Undisclosed
FW	(South Korea) Oh Se-hun	(Japan) Shimizu S-Pulse	Undisclosed
FW	(Japan) Takuma Nishimura	(Japan) Yokohama F. Marinos	Free

==== Out ====
Transfers out

Position	Player	Transferred to	Fee
GK	(Japan) Koki Fukui	(Japan) Cerezo Osaka	Free
DF	(Japan) Junya Suzuki	(Japan) Yokohama FC	Free
DF	(Japan) Daiki Sugioka	(Japan) Shonan Bellmare	End of loan
DF	(Japan) Daisuke Matsumoto	(Japan) Zweigen Kanazawa	Free
DF	(South Korea) Jang Min-gyu	(South Korea) Jeju SK	Free
MF	(Japan) Takuya Yasui	(Japan) JEF United Chiba	Free
FW	(Japan) Kazuki Fujimoto	(Japan) Avispa Fukuoka	Free
FW	(Japan) Shunta Araki	(Japan) Vegalta Sendai	Free

Loan out

Position	Player	Transferred to	Fee
DF	(Japan) Soichiro Fukaminato	(Japan) Blaublitz Akita	Season loan
MF	(Japan) Kosei Ashibe	(Japan) Mito HollyHock	Season loan
MF	(Japan) Tenshiro Takasaki	(Japan) Shibuya City FC	Season loan
MF	(Japan) Kai Shibato	(Japan) Urawa Red Diamonds	Season loan
MF	(Japan) Sho Fuseya	(Japan) Kataller Toyama	Season loan
FW	(Brazil) Erik	(Japan) Vissel Kobe	Season loan
FW	(Chile) Byron Vásquez	(Japan) Tochigi City	Season loan
FW	(Japan) Atsushi Kurokawa	(Latvia) FK Tukums 2000	Season loan

=== Mid-season ===
==== In ====
Position	Player	Transferred from	Fee
MF	(Japan) Asahi Masuyama	(Japan) V-Varen Nagasaki	Undisclosed
MF	(Israel) (Portugal) Neta Lavi	(Japan) Gamba Osaka	Undisclosed
DF	(Japan) Tomoki Imai	(Australia) Western United	Free

Loan return (in)

Position	Player	Transferred from	Fee
DF	(Japan) Soichiro Fukaminato	(Japan) Blaublitz Akita	Early loan termination (Note: Fukaminato loan terminate so to move to another club.)
MF	(Japan) Tenshiro Takasaki	(Japan) Shibuya City FC	End of loan

==== Out ====
Transfer Out

Position	Player	Transferred from	Fee
DF	(Japan) Soichiro Fukaminato	(Japan) Iwaki FC	Undisclosed

Loan out

Position	Player	Transferred to	Fee
MF	(Japan) Kosei Ashibe	(Japan) Fukushima United	Season loan
FW	(Japan) Daigo Takahashi	(Japan) Giravanz Kitakyushu	Season loan
GK	(Japan) (United States) Anton Burns	(Japan) Roasso Kumamoto	Season loan

== Competitions ==
=== J1 League ===
Table=

Pos	Team	Pld	W	D	L	GF	GA	GD	Pts	Qualification or relegation
4	Sanfrecce Hiroshima	38	20	8	10	46	28	+18	68	
5	Vissel Kobe	38	18	10	10	46	33	+13	64	
6	Machida Zelvia	38	17	9	12	52	38	+14	60	Qualification for the AFC Champions League Two group stage (Note: Qualified as the 2025 Emperor's Cup winners.)
7	Urawa Red Diamonds	38	16	11	11	45	39	+6	59	
8	Kawasaki Frontale	38	15	12	11	66	56	+10	57	

Source: JLeague.co, JLeague.jp, J.League Data Site
Rules for classification: 1) Points; 2) Goal difference; 3) Goals scored; 4) Head-to-head points; 5) Head-to-head goal difference; 6) Head-to-head goals scored; 7) Fewer disciplinary points.

==== Matches ====
The matches were unveiled on 23 January.

16 February 1	Machida Zelvia	1–2	Sanfrecce Hiroshima	Tokyo
	Yuki Soma 26'; Oh Se-hun (yellow card) 58'; Takuma Nishimura (yellow card) 79'	Report	Tolgay Arslan 59' (yellow card) 48'; Sota Nakamura 77'	Stadium: Japan National Stadium; Attendance: 12,773; Referee: Yudai Yamamoto

22 February 2	FC Tokyo	0–1	Machida Zelvia	Chōfu
	Kenta Doi (yellow card) 18'; Yuto Nagamoto (yellow card) 68'	Report	Takuma Nishimura 82'; Oh Se-hun (yellow card) 38'; Ibrahim Drešević (yellow card) 60'; Hiroyuki Mae (yellow card) 79'	Stadium: Ajinomoto Stadium; Attendance: 29,545; Referee: Futoshi Nakamura

26 February 3	Machida Zelvia	0–1	Tokyo Verdy	Tokyo
	Takuma Nishimura (yellow card) 33'; Na Sang-ho (yellow card) 53'; Yuki Soma (yellow card) 78'	Report	Kosuke Saito 13'; Goki Yamada (yellow card) 19'; Hiroto Taniguchi (yellow card) 90+3'	Stadium: Japan National Stadium; Attendance: 6,825; Referee: Nathan Verboomen (Belgium)

2 March 4	Nagoya Grampus	1–2	Machida Zelvia	Toyota
	Yota Sato 20'	Report	Takuma Nishimura 13'; Na Sang-ho 73'; Kanji Kuwayama (yellow card) 82'; Ryōhei Shirasaki (yellow card) 88'	Stadium: Toyota Stadium; Attendance: 34,718; Referee: Takuto Okabe

8 March 5	Yokohama FC	0–2	Machida Zelvia	Yokohama
	Yuri Lara (yellow card) 71'	Report	Kanji Kuwayama 51'; Na Sang-ho 86'; Kotaro Hayashi (yellow card) 58'	Stadium: Mitsuzawa Stadium; Attendance: Koki Nagamine; Referee: 7,934

15 March 6	Machida Zelvia	1–0	Albirex Niigata	Tokyo
	Takuma Nishimura 25'; Hokuto Shimoda (yellow card) 16'	Report		Stadium: Japan National Stadium; Attendance: 10,152; Referee: Toji Takashi

29 March 7	Avispa Fukuoka	2–2	Machida Zelvia	Fukuoka
	Tomoya Ando 22'; Kosei Tani 65' (o.g.); Tomoya Miki (yellow card) 42'	Report	Daihachi Okamura 10' (yellow card) 25'; Keiya Sento 84'	Stadium: Best Denki Stadium; Attendance: 7,600; Referee: Akihiko Ikeuchi

2 April 8	Gamba Osaka	0–1	Machida Zelvia	Osaka
		Report	Yuki Soma 43'; Kotaro Hayashi (yellow card) 79'	Stadium: Suita City Football Stadium; Attendance: 23,125; Referee: Takafumi Mikuriya

6 April 9	Machida Zelvia	2–2	Kawasaki Frontale	Tokyo
	Daihachi Okamura 34' (yellow card) 21'; Takuma Nishimura 53'; Yuki Soma (yellow card) 41'	Report	Erison 16'; So Kawahara 73'	Stadium: Japan National Stadium; Attendance: 11,974; Referee: Hiroyuki Kimura

13 April 10	Machida Zelvia	0–2	Urawa Red Diamonds	Tokyo
	Shota Fujio (yellow card) 70'; Hokuto Shimoda (yellow card) 71'	Report	Marius Høibråten 15'; Yusuke Matsuo 38'	Stadium: Japan National Stadium; Attendance: 44,363; Referee: Yudai Yamamoto

20 April 11	Vissel Kobe	1–0	Machida Zelvia	Kobe
	Daihachi Okamura 62' (o.g.)	Report	Ibrahim Drešević (yellow card) 37'; Na Sangho (yellow card) 90'	Stadium: Noevir Stadium Kobe; Attendance: 21,920; Referee: Hiroki Kasahara

25 April 12	Machida Zelvia	0–1	Shonan Bellmare	Tokyo
	Gen Shoji (yellow card) 86'; Yuki Soma (yellow card) 89'	Report	Masaki Ikeda 90+3'; Junnosuke Suzuki (yellow card) 8'	Stadium: Japan National Stadium; Attendance: 7,683; Referee: Futoshi Nakamura

29 April 13	Cerezo Osaka	1–2	Machida Zelvia	Osaka
	Thiago Andrade 90+2'; Shinji Kagawa (yellow card) 52'	Report	Oh Se-hun 48'; Ibrahim Drešević 78' (yellow card) 90+6'; Hiroyuki Mae (yellow card) 19'; Shota Fujio (yellow card) 26'	Stadium: Yodoko Sakura Stadium; Attendance: 18,030; Referee: Koei Koya

3 May 14	Kashima Antlers	1–0	Machida Zelvia	Tokyo
	Kyosuke Tagawa 39'; Kim Tae Hyeon (yellow card) 53'; Cavric (yellow card) 87'	Report		Stadium: Japan National Stadium; Attendance: 33,762; Referee: Takafumi Mikuriya

7 May 15	Machida Zelvia	1–2	Kyoto Sanga	Tokyo
	Henry Hiroki Mochizuki 38'; Gen Shoji (yellow card) 75'	Report	Sora Hiraga 73'; Shinnosuke Fukuda 90+5' (yellow card) 33'; Shun Nagasawa (yellow card) 65'	Stadium: Japan National Stadium; Attendance: 7,183; Referee: Koji Takasaki

11 May 16	Shimizu S-Pulse	2–2	Machida Zelvia	Shizuoka
	Koya Kitagawa 66' (pen.); Douglas Tanque 84'	Report	Takuma Nishimura 21'; Kotaro Hayashi 67'	Stadium: IAI Stadium Nihondaira; Attendance: 16,741; Referee: Yoshimi Yamashita

17 May 17	Machida Zelvia	3–0	Kashiwa Reysol	Tokyo
	Kotaro Hayashi 4' (yellow card) 35'; Taiyo Koga 15' (o.g.); Na Sang-ho 45' (pen.)	Report		Stadium: Japan National Stadium; Attendance: 8,741; Referee: Akihiko Ikeuchi

25 May 18	Fagiano Okayama	2–2	Machida Zelvia	Okayama
	Kazunari Ichimi 26'; Takaya Kimura 55'	Report	Yuki Soma 76'; Mitch Duke 81'	Stadium: JFE Harenokuni Stadium; Attendance: 14,022; Referee: Ryo Tanimoto

31 May 19	Machida Zelvia	0–3	Yokohama F. Marinos	Tokyo
		Report	Daiya Tono 23', 27' (yellow card) 90+1'; Hiroyuki Mae 90+4' (o.g)	Stadium: Japan National Stadium; Attendance: 10,289; Referee: Fu Ming (China)

14 June 20	Shonan Bellmare	1–2	Machida Zelvia	Hiratsuka
	Sho Fukuda 62'	Report	Shota Fujio 45+2'; Na Sangho 83'; Hiroyuki Mae (yellow card) 23'	Stadium: Lemon Gas Stadium Hiratsuka; Attendance: 10,745; Referee: Hiroki Kasahara

21 June 21	Machida Zelvia	2–1	Kashima Antlers	Tokyo
	Yuki Soma 6'; Daihachi Okamura 34'; Shota Fujio (yellow card) 62'	Report	Yuma Suzuki 86'	Stadium: Japan National Stadium; Attendance: 13,828; Referee: Yudai Yamamoto

29 June 22	Albirex Niigata	0–4	Machida Zelvia	Niigata
		Report	Takuma Nishimura 43'; Yuki Soma 61', 67'; Shota Fujio 76'; Hokuto Shimoda (yellow card) 51'	Stadium: Denka Big Swan Stadium; Attendance: 20,087; Referee: Hayato Shimizu

5 July 23	Machida Zelvia	3–0	Shimizu S-Pulse	Tokyo
	Ryuho Kikuchi 13'; Yūki Sōma 75' (pen.); Takaya Numata 90+3'; Henry Heroki Mochizuki (yellow card) 29'	Report		Stadium: Japan National Stadium; Attendance: 11,779; Referee: Takuto Okabe

20 July 24	Tokyo Verdy	0–1	Machida Zelvia	Chōfu
		Report	Ryuho Kikuchi 63'	Stadium: Ajinomoto Stadium; Attendance: 22,217; Referee: Yudai Yamamoto

10 August 25	Machida Zelvia	2–0	Vissel Kobe	Tokyo
	Yuta Nakayama 6'; Yūki Sōma 35'; Daihachi Okamura (yellow card) 65'	Report		Stadium: Japan National Stadium; Attendance: 12,619; Referee: Hiroyuki Kimura

16 August 26	Machida Zelvia	3–0	Cerezo Osaka	Tokyo
	Na Sangho 22'; Kotaro Hayashi 42'; Oh Se-hun 78'; Yūki Sōma (yellow card) 77'	Report	Rafael Ratao (yellow card) 20'; Shunta Tanaka (yellow card) 66'; Lucas Fernandez (yellow card) 86'	Stadium: Japan National Stadium; Attendance: 11,971; Referee: Hiroki Kasahara

23 August 27	Yokohama F. Marinos	0–0	Machida Zelvia	Yokohama
	Asahi Uenaka (yellow card) 40'	Report	Mitchell Duke (yellow card) 57'; Yuki Soma (yellow card) 81'; Daihachi Okamura (yellow card) 90+5'	Stadium: Nissan Stadium; Attendance: 32,188; Referee: Takafumi Mikuriya

31 August 28	Kawasaki Frontale	5–3	Machida Zelvia	Kawasaki
	Tatsuya Ito 20'; Erison 45+4', 78'; Ten Miyagi 65'; Marcinho 90+10' (yellow card) 90+11'	Report	Na Sangho 28'; Hokuto Shimoda 36'; Yuki Soma 71'; Ibrahim Drešević (yellow card) 59'; Gen Shoji (yellow card) 82'	Stadium: Kawasaki Todoroki Stadium; Attendance: 22,270; Referee: Kôichirô Fukushima

12 September 29 (Rescheduled)	Machida Zelvia	1–1	Yokohama FC	Tokyo
	Mitchell Duke 85'	Report	Makito Ito 56'; Hinata Ogura (yellow card) 51'; Jakub Słowik (yellow card) 90+5'	Stadium: Japan National Stadium; Attendance: 7,035; Referee: Yoshiro Imamura

20 August 30 (Rescheduled)	Machida Zelvia	3–1	Gamba Osaka	Tokyo
	Gen Shoji 17'; Kotaro Hayashi 78'; Takuma Nishimura 90'; Shota Fujio (yellow card) 46'	Report	Deniz Hümmet 61'	Stadium: Japan National Stadium; Attendance: 10,108; Referee: Iván Barton (El Salvador)

23 September 31	Kyoto Sanga	1–1	Machida Zelvia	Kyoto
	Taichi Hara 90+3' (pen.); Joao Pedro (yellow card) 20'; Shohei Takeda (yellow card) 53'; Shuto Wakui (yellow card) 90+3'	Report	Daihachi Okamura 16'; Hiroyuki Mae (yellow card) 49'; Takaya Numata (yellow card) 90+1'	Stadium: Sanga Stadium by Kyocera; Attendance: 18,964; Referee: Jumpei Iida

27 September 32	Machida Zelvia	1–0	Fagiano Okayama	Tokyo
	Gen Shoji 90+5'	Report	Yoshitake Suzuki (yellow card) 48'	Stadium: Japan National Stadium; Referee: Shu Kawamata

4 October 33	Sanfrecce Hiroshima	2–1	Machida Zelvia	Hiroshima
	Kim Ju-sung 88' (yellow card) 88'; Tolgay Arslan 90+5' (pen.) (yellow card) 90+5'; Michael Skibbe (yellow card) 66'	Report	Yuki Soma 50'; Takuma Nishimura (yellow card) 29'	Stadium: Edion Peace Wing Hiroshima; Attendance: 25,877; Referee: Hiroki Kasahara

18 October 34	Machida Zelvia	0–0	Avispa Fukuoka	Tokyo
		Report		Stadium: Japan National Stadium; Attendance: 9,680; Referee: Ryo Tanimoto

25 October 35	Urawa Red Diamonds	0–0	Machida Zelvia	Saitama
		Report	Asahi Masuyama (yellow card) 36'; Hiroyuki Mae (yellow card) 85'; Na Sangho (yellow card) 90'	Stadium: Saitama Stadium 2002; Attendance: 34,551; Referee: Kôichirô Fukushima

9 November 36	Machida Zelvia	0–1	FC Tokyo	Tokyo
	Hiroyuki Mae (yellow card) 42'	Report	Soma Anzai 87'; Takahiro Ko (yellow card) 74'	Stadium: Japan National Stadium; Attendance: 46,838; Referee: Futoshi Nakamura

30 November 37	Machida Zelvia	3–1	Nagoya Grampus	Tokyo
	Mitchell Duke 42' (yellow card) 51'; Hotaka Nakamura 50' (yellow card) 45+4'; Gen Shoji 72'; Ibrahim Drešević (yellow card) 90+4'	Report	Sho Inagaki 61' (pen.); Yuki Nogami (yellow card) 42'	Stadium: Japan National Stadium; Attendance: 12,396; Referee: Koei Koya

6 December 38	Kashiwa Reysol	1–0	Machida Zelvia	Chiba
	Daihachi Okamura 63' (o.g.); Hayato Nakama (yellow card) 77'	Report		Stadium: Sankyo Frontier Kashiwa Stadium; Attendance: 14,092; Referee: Koichiro Fukushima

=== J.League Cup ===
9 April First round – Match 2	Ventforet Kofu	0–1	FC Machida Zelvia	Kofu
	Shinji Otsuka (yellow card) 45'	Report	Keiya Sento 45+2'	Stadium: JIT Recycle Ink Stadium; Attendance: 4,899; Referee: Keigo Sendachi

21 May First round – Match 3	Yokohama FC	1–1 (a.e.t.) (3–1 p)	FC Machida Zelvia	Yokohama
	Keijiro Ogawa 84'; Junya Suzuki (yellow card) 28'; Akito Fukumori (yellow card) 68'	Report	Shota Fujio 12' (yellow card) 99'; Kotaro Hayashi (yellow card) 112'	Stadium: Nippatsu Mitsuzawa Stadium; Attendance: 3,203; Referee: Martin Petersen (Germany)
	Penalties
	Keijiro Ogawa (penalty scored); Akito Fukumori (penalty scored); Kaito Mori (penalty scored)		(penalty missed) Keiya Sento; (penalty missed) Gen Shoji; (penalty scored) Byron Vásquez; (penalty missed) Daihachi Okamura

=== Emperor's Cup ===
11 June Round 2	FC Machida Zelvia	2–1	Kyoto Sangyo University (UL)	Machida
	Shota Fujio 86'; Yuki Soma 90+2' (pen.); Keiya Sento (yellow card) 88'	Report	Sakyo Hasegawa 58'	Stadium: Machida GION Stadium; Attendance: 1,704; Referee: Takafumi Mikuriya

16 July Round 3	FC Machida Zelvia	2–1	Kataller Toyama (J2)	Machida
	Takuma Nishimura 21'; Daihachi Okamura 73'; Takaya Numata (yellow card) 43'	Report	Hayate Take 45'; Nobuyuki Shiina (yellow card) 69'	Stadium: Machida GION Stadium; Attendance: 3,629; Referee: Kōki Nagamine

6 August Round 4	FC Machida Zelvia	1–0	Kyoto Sanga	Machida
	Shota Fujio 58'; Daihachi Okamura (yellow card) 12'	Report	Rafael Elias (yellow card) 65'	Stadium: Machida GION Stadium; Attendance: 3,003; Referee: Masuya Ueda

27 August Quarter Final	FC Machida Zelvia	3–0	Kashima Antlers	Machida
	Asahi Masuyama 15'; Shota Fujio 21'; Hokuto Shimoda 46' (yellow card) 57'	Report		Stadium: Machida GION Stadium; Attendance: 5,965; Referee: Yusuke Araki

18 November Semi Final	FC Machida Zelvia	2–0 (a.e.t.)	FC Tokyo	Machida
	Kotaro Hayashi 103'; Oh Se-hun 109'; Yūta Nakayama (yellow card) 73'	Report		Stadium: Machida GION Stadium; Attendance: 25,961; Referee: Akihiko Ikeuchi

22 November Final	FC Machida Zelvia	3–1	Vissel Kobe	Shinjuku
14:00	Shota Fujio 6', 56'; Yuki Soma 32'; Yūta Nakayama (yellow card) 48'; Ibrahim Drešević (yellow card) 37'	Report	Taisei Miyashiro 62'; Yoshinori Muto (yellow card) 42'; Tetsushi Yamakawa (yellow card) 72'; Kosei Tani (yellow card) 88'	Stadium: Japan National Stadium; Attendance: 31,414; Referee: Hiroyuki Kimura

=== AFC Champions League ===
==== League stage ====
Win Draw Loss

16 September 2025 MD 1	FC Machida Zelvia (Japan)	1–1	(South Korea) FC Seoul	Machida, Japan
	Henry Hiroki Mochizuki 80'	Report	Marko Dugandžić 59'; Kim Jin-su (yellow card) 82'	Stadium: Machida GION Stadium; Attendance: 4,798; Referee: Asker Nadjafaliev (Uzbekistan)

30 September 2025 MD 2	Johor Darul Ta'zim (Malaysia)	0–0	(Japan) FC Machida Zelvia	Johor, Malaysia
	Afiq Fazail (yellow card) 30'	Report	Yuki Soma (penalty missed) 23	Stadium: Sultan Ibrahim Stadium; Attendance: 28,915; Referee: Kim Jong-hyeok (South Korea)

21 October 2025 MD 3	Shanghai Port (China)	0–2	(Japan) FC Machida Zelvia	Shanghai, China
	Matheus Jussa (yellow card) 88'	Report	Fu Huan 12' (o.g.); Yuki Soma 25' (yellow card) 48'	Stadium: Pudong Football Stadium; Attendance: 10,197; Referee: Ahmed Issa (United Arab Emirates)

4 November 2025 MD 4	FC Machida Zelvia (Japan)	1–2	(Australia) Melbourne City	Machida, Japan
	Henry Hiroki Mochizuki 24'; Yuta Nakayama (yellow card) 55'	Report	Gen Shoji 1' (o.g.); Andrew Nabbout 90+4'	Stadium: Machida GION Stadium; Attendance: 4,401; Referee: Abdulla Al-Marri (Qatar)

25 November 2025 MD 5	Gangwon FC (South Korea)	1–3	(Japan) FC Machida Zelvia	Gangneung, South Korea
	Park Ho-Yeong 55'; Lee Seung-won (yellow card) 27'	Report	Keiya Sento 24'; Hokuto Shimoda 28'; Oh Se-hun 39'; Yuta Nakayama (yellow card) 76'	Stadium: Gangneung Stadium; Attendance: 3,502; Referee: Khalid Saleh Al-Turais (Saudi Arabia)

9 December 2025 MD 6	FC Machida Zelvia (Japan)	3–1	(South Korea) Ulsan HD FC	Machida, Japan
	Asahi Masuyama 6'; Takuma Nishimura 21'; Oh Se-Hun 46'	Report	Um Won-Sang 55'; Jung Seung-Hyun (yellow card) 34'	Stadium: Machida GION Stadium; Attendance: 4,345; Referee: Nazmi Nasaruddin (Malaysia)

10 February 2026 MD 7	Shanghai Shenhua (China)	0–2	(Japan) FC Machida Zelvia	Shanghai, China
	Jin Shunkai (yellow card) 2'; Makhtar Gueye (yellow card) 34'	Report	Yuki Soma 3' (pen.), 88'	Stadium: Shanghai Stadium; Attendance: 16,158; Referee: Omar Al-Ali (United Arab Emirates)

17 February 2026 MD 8	FC Machida Zelvia (Japan)	–	(China) Chengdu Rongcheng	Machida, Japan
		Report		Stadium: Machida GION Stadium

Pos	Team	Pld	W	D	L	GF	GA	GD	Pts	Qualification
1	(Japan) Machida Zelvia	8	5	2	1	15	7	+8	17	Advance to round of 16
2	(Japan) Vissel Kobe	8	5	1	2	14	7	+7	16	Advance to round of 16
3	(Japan) Sanfrecce Hiroshima	8	4	3	1	10	6	+4	15	Advance to round of 16
4	(Thailand) Buriram United	8	4	2	2	10	8	+2	14	Advance to round of 16
5	(Australia) Melbourne City	8	4	2	2	9	7	+2	14	Advance to round of 16
6	(Malaysia) Johor Darul Ta'zim	8	3	2	3	8	7	+1	11	Advance to round of 16
7	(South Korea) FC Seoul	8	2	4	2	10	9	+1	10	Advance to round of 16
8	(South Korea) Gangwon FC	8	2	3	3	9	11	−2	9	Advance to round of 16
9	(South Korea) Ulsan HD	8	2	3	3	6	8	−2	9	
10	(China) Chengdu Rongcheng	8	1	3	4	7	11	−4	6	
11	(China) Shanghai Shenhua	8	1	1	6	5	13	−8	4	
12	(China) Shanghai Port	8	0	4	4	2	11	−9	4	

Source: ACLE
Rules for classification: 1) points; 2) goal difference; 3) number of goals scored; 4) number of matches won; 5) penalty shoot-out if only two teams remain tied and played each other on the final matchday 6) fair play ranking; 7) drawing of lots

== Team statistics ==
=== Appearances and goals ===
As of 9 December 2025

No.	Pos.	Player	J1 League		J.League Cup		Emperor's Cup		2025/26 AFC Champions League Elite		Total	
No.	Pos.	Player	Apps.	Goals	Apps.	Goals	Apps.	Goals	Apps.	Goals	Apps.	Goals
1	GK	(Japan) Kosei Tani	37	0	0	0	5	0	6	0	48	0
3	DF	(Japan) Gen Shoji	37	3	0+2	0	4	0	5+1	0	49	3
4	MF	(Japan) Ryuho Kikuchi	9	2	1	0	1+2	0	0	0	12	2
5	DF	(Kosovo) (Sweden) Ibrahim Drešević	24+8	1	2	0	5	0	6	0	45	1
6	DF	(Japan) (Nigeria) Henry Hiroki Mochizuki	25+6	1	2	0	4	0	6	2	43	3
7	MF	(Japan) Yuki Soma	30+3	10	0	0	3+2	2	4+2	1	44	12
8	MF	(Japan) Keiya Sento	9+17	1	1+1	1	3+1	0	3+2	1	37	3
9	FW	(Japan) Shōta Fujio	16+17	2	2	1	5+1	5	2+4	0	48	8
10	FW	(South Korea) Na Sang-ho	10+22	5	0	0	3+2	0	4+1	0	42	5
11	MF	(Japan) Asahi Masuyama	5	0	0	0	2+1	1	5	0	13	1
13	GK	(Japan) Tatsuya Morita	1	0	2	0	1	0	0	0	4	0
15	FW	(Australia) Mitchell Duke	9+16	3	2	0	3+2	0	1+4	0	37	3
16	MF	(Japan) Hiroyuki Mae	30+1	0	1+1	0	4+1	0	4+1	0	43	0
17	GK	(Japan) (Myanmar) Kaung Zan Mara	0	0	0	0	0	0	0	0	0	0
18	MF	(Japan) Hokuto Shimoda	21+13	0	1+1	0	1+3	1	4+2	1	47	2
19	DF	(Japan) Yūta Nakayama	26+4	1	1+1	0	5	0	6	0	43	1
20	FW	(Japan) Takuma Nishimura	26+3	7	1+2	0	1+2	1	1+2	1	38	9
22	FW	(Japan) Takaya Numata	1+11	1	1	0	1+2	0	0+1	0	16	1
23	MF	(Japan) Ryōhei Shirasaki	7+12	0	2	0	2+2	0	0	0	25	0
26	DF	(Japan) Kotaro Hayashi	27+4	4	3	0	5+1	1	3+3	0	46	5
28	MF	(South Korea) Cha Je-hoon	0	0	0	0	0	0	0	0	0	0
30	FW	(Japan) Yuki Nakashima	0	0	0	0	0	0	0	0	0	0
31	MF	(Israel) (Portugal) Neta Lavi	1+5	0	0	0	0	0	0+1	0	7	0
38	MF	(Japan) Tenshiro Takasaki	0	0	0	0	0	0	0	0	0	0
39	MF	(Chile) (Japan) Byron Vásquez	0	0	0+1	0	0+1	0	0	0	2	0
44	GK	(Japan) Yoshiaki Arai	0	0	0	0	0	0	0	0	0	0
49	MF	(Japan) Kanji Kuwayama	1+20	1	0+2	0	1+2	0	0	0	26	1
50	DF	(Japan) Daihachi Okamura	31+1	4	2	0	2+1	1	2+1	0	40	5
55	GK	(Japan) (United States) Anton Burns	0	0	0	0	0	0	0	0	0	0
77	DF	(Japan) Takumi Narasaka	0	0	0	0	1	0	0	0	1	0
88	DF	(Japan) Hotaka Nakamura	4+1	1	0	0	3	0	0	0	8	1
90	FW	(South Korea) Oh Se-hun	16+15	2	0	0	0+2	1	4+2	2	39	5
??	DF	(Japan) Tomoki Imai	0	0	0	0	0	0	0	0	0	0
Players featured on a match for the team, but left the club mid-season, either permanently or on loan transfer
99	FW	(Japan) Daigo Takahashi	0+1	0	2	0	1	0	0	0	4	0
