= 2026 FC Machida Zelvia season =

Machida Zelvia
2026 season
- Manager: Go Kuroda
- Stadium: Machida GION Stadium
Home colours	Away colours
- All statistics correct as of 2 March 2025.

The 2026 FC Machida Zelvia season was the club's 38th season in history.

== Squad ==
=== Season squad ===
Squad no.	Name	Nationality	Date of birth	Previous Team
Goalkeepers
1	Kosei Tani	(Japan)	22 November 2000 (age 25)	(Belgium) Dender
13	Tatsuya Morita	(Japan)	3 August 1990 (age 35)	(Japan) Kashiwa Reysol
17	Kaung Zan Mara	(Japan) (Myanmar)	11 June 2002 (age 24)	(Japan) Sanno University
44	Yoshiaki Arai	(Japan)	27 September 1995 (age 30)	(Japan) Oita Trinita
	Aki Koch	(Japan)	18 March 2004 (age 22)	(Germany) Karlsruher SC
Defenders
2	Tomoki Imai	(Japan)	29 November 1990 (age 35)	(Australia) Western United
3	Gen Shoji (c)	(Japan)	11 December 1992 (age 33)	(Japan) Kashima Antlers
5	Ibrahim Drešević	(Kosovo) (Sweden)	24 January 1997 (age 29)	(Turkey) Fatih Karagümrük
6	Henry Hiroki Mochizuki	(Japan) (Nigeria)	20 September 2001 (age 24)	(Japan) Kokushikan University
19	Yūta Nakayama	(Japan)	16 February 1997 (age 29)	(England) Huddersfield Town
24	Kim Min-tae	(South Korea)	26 November 1993 (age 32)	(Japan) Shimizu S-Pulse
26	Kotaro Hayashi	(Japan)	16 November 2000 (age 25)	(Japan) Yokohama FC
50	Daihachi Okamura	(Japan)	15 February 1997 (age 29)	(Japan) Hokkaido Consadole Sapporo
88	Hotaka Nakamura	(Japan)	12 August 1997 (age 28)	(Japan) FC Tokyo
Midfielders
4	Ryuho Kikuchi	(Japan)	9 December 1996 (age 29)	(Japan) Vissel Kobe
8	Keiya Sento	(Japan)	29 December 1994 (age 31)	(Japan) Kashiwa Reysol
11	Asahi Masuyama	(Japan)	29 January 1997 (age 29)	(Japan) V-Varen Nagasaki
16	Hiroyuki Mae	(Japan)	1 August 1995 (age 30)	(Japan) Avispa Fukuoka
18	Hokuto Shimoda	(Japan)	7 November 1991 (age 34)	(Japan) Oita Trinita
23	Ryōhei Shirasaki	(Japan)	18 May 1993 (age 33)	(Japan) Shimizu S-Pulse
28	Cha Je-hoon	(South Korea)	3 May 2006 (age 20)	(South Korea) Jungkyung High School
31	Neta Lavi	(Israel) (Portugal)	25 August 1996 (age 29)	(Japan) Gamba Osaka
34	Futa Tokumura	(Japan)	26 November 2007 (age 18)	(Japan) Kamigaku High School
38	Tenshiro Takasaki	(Japan)	13 February 2006 (age 20)	(Japan) Quon Football Academy
39	Byron Vásquez	(Chile) (Japan)	16 May 2000 (age 26)	(Japan) Tochigi City
60	Mayaka Chui Hiromu	(Japan) (Nigeria)	11 August 2006 (age 19)	Youth Team
Forwards
7	Yuki Soma	(Japan)	25 February 1997 (age 29)	(Portugal) Casa Pia
9	Shōta Fujio	(Japan)	2 May 2001 (age 25)	(Japan) Cerezo Osaka
10	Na Sang-ho	(South Korea)	12 August 1996 (age 29)	(South Korea) FC Seoul
20	Takuma Nishimura	(Japan)	22 October 1996 (age 29)	(Japan) Yokohama F. Marinos
22	Takaya Numata	(Japan)	19 April 1999 (age 27)	(Japan) Kagoshima United FC
27	Erik	(Brazil)	18 July 1994 (age 31)	(Japan) Vissel Kobe
49	Kanji Kuwayama	(Japan)	28 November 2002 (age 23)	(Japan) Tokai University
99	Tete Yengi	(Australia) (South Sudan) (England)	28 November 2000 (age 25)	(Scotland) Livingston
Players loaned out
37	Kosei Ashibe	(Japan)	5 April 2001 (age 25)	(Japan) Fukushima United
55	Anton Burns	(Japan) (United States)	1 October 2003 (age 22)	(Japan) Roasso Kumamoto
77	Takumi Narasaka	(Japan)	6 July 2002 (age 23)	(Japan) Kamatamare Sanuki
90	Oh Se-hun	(South Korea)	15 January 1999 (age 27)	(Japan) Shimizu S-Pulse

Last updated: 19 August 2024.
Source: FC Machida Zelvia website

== Transfers ==
=== In ===
Pre-season

Date	Position	Player	Transferred from	Ref
Permanent Transfer
31 December 2025	MF	(Japan) Sho Fuseya	(Japan) Kataller Toyama	End of loan (Note: Fuseya left club for Kataller Toyama permanently after contract end.)
31 December 2025	MF	(Japan) Kai Shibato	(Japan) Urawa Red Diamonds	End of loan
31 December 2025	MF	(Japan) Kosei Ashibe	(Japan) Fukushima United	End of loan
31 December 2025	FW	(Japan) Atsushi Kurokawa	(Latvia) FK Tukums 2000	End of loan
31 December 2025	FW	(Japan) Daigo Takahashi	(Japan) Giravanz Kitakyushu	End of loan (Note: Takahashi returns to Kitakyushu permanently after his contract with Zelvia ended.)
4 January 2026	GK	(Japan) (United States) Anton Burns	(Japan) Roasso Kumamoto	End of loan
4 January 2026	DF	(Japan) Mizuki Uchida	(Japan) Kamatamare Sanuki	End of loan
7 January 2026	FW	(Chile) Byron Vásquez	(Japan) Tochigi City	End of loan
7 January 2026	FW	(Brazil) Erik	(Japan) Vissel Kobe	End of loan
5 February 2026	DF	(South Korea) Kim Min-tae	(Japan) Shonan Bellmare	Free
Loan Transfer
28 January 2026	FW	(Australia) (South Sudan) (England) Tete Yengi	(Scotland) Livingston	Season loan

Post-season

Date	Position	Player	Transferred from	Ref
Permanent Transfer
7 June 2026	GK	(Japan) (Germany) Aki Koch	(Germany) Karlsruhe SC	Free
June 2026	MF	(Japan) Shunki Higashi	(Japan) Sanfrecce Hiroshima	Undisclosed
Loan Transfer

=== Out ===
Pre-season

Date	Position	Player	Transferred from	Ref
Permanent Transfer
25 December 2025	FW	(Australia) Mitchell Duke	(Australia) Macarthur FC	Free
31 December 2025	MF	(Japan) Ken Higuchi	(Japan) YSCC Yokohama	Free
31 December 2025	MF	(Japan) Sho Fuseya	(Japan) Kataller Toyama	Free
31 December 2025	FW	(Japan) Yuki Nakashima	(Japan) Kataller Toyama	Free
31 December 2025	FW	(Japan) Daigo Takahashi	(Japan) Giravanz Kitakyushu	Free
5 January 2026	DF	(Japan) Mizuki Uchida	(Japan) Hokkaido Consadole Sapporo	Free
13 March 2026	FW	(Japan) Atsushi Kurokawa	(Japan) Ventforet Kofu	Free
Loan Transfer
25 December 2025	MF	(Japan) Kosei Ashibe	(Japan) Fukushima United	Season loan
30 December 2025	FW	(South Korea) Oh Se-hun	(Japan) Shimizu S-Pulse	Season loan
4 January 2026	DF	(Japan) Takumi Narasaka	(Japan) Giravanz Kitakyushu	Season loan
5 January 2026	GK	(Japan) (United States) Anton Burns	(Japan) Gainare Tottori	Season loan till Jan-27

== Pre-season and friendlies ==
=== Tour of Okinawa (11 Jan - 24 Jan) ===
15 January 1	Machida Zelvia	2–3	Gamba Osaka	Okinawa
	Yuki Soma 6'; Gen Shoji 64'		Ryoya Yamashita 11'; Jiro Nakamura 45'; Harumi Minamino 87'	Stadium: Yoshinoura Park Gosamaru Athletics Stadium

== Competitions ==
=== J1 League ===
==== Matches ====
The matches were unveiled on 19 December.

Pos	Team	Pld	W	PKW	PKL	L	GF	GA	GD	Pts	Qualification
1	Kashima Antlers	18	13	2	2	1	29	9	+20	45	Final
2	FC Tokyo	18	9	4	2	3	28	16	+12	37	3rd–4th place playoff
3	Machida Zelvia	18	8	5	3	2	23	19	+4	37	5th–6th place playoff
4	Kawasaki Frontale	18	7	3	1	7	23	27	−4	28	7th–8th place playoff
5	Tokyo Verdy	18	7	3	1	7	19	25	−6	28	9th–10th place playoff
6	Urawa Red Diamonds	18	7	0	4	7	25	18	+7	25	11th–12th place playoff
7	Yokohama F. Marinos	18	6	0	2	10	28	29	−1	20	13th–14th place playoff
8	Kashiwa Reysol	18	6	1	0	11	21	24	−3	20	15th–16th place playoff
9	Mito HollyHock	18	2	4	4	8	19	35	−16	18	17th–18th place playoff
10	JEF United Chiba	18	3	0	3	12	18	31	−13	12	19th–20th place playoff

Source: JLeague.co, J.League Data Site
Rules for classification: 1) Points; 2) Goal difference; 3) Goals scored; 4) Head-to-head.

6 February 1	Yokohama F. Marinos	2–3	Machida Zelvia	Yokohama
	Daiya Tōno 16' (pen.); Jordy Croux 67'; Ryo Miyaichi (yellow card) 47'	Report	Yuki Soma 45+2'; Erik 8', 17'	Stadium: Nissan Stadium; Attendance: 30,529; Referee: Yusuke Araki

14 February 2	Machida Zelvia	2–2 (4–2 p)	Mito HollyHock	Tokyo
	Erik 39'; Gen Shoji 45+3'	Report	Taishi Semba 42'; Yoshiki Torikai 44'	Stadium: Machida GION Stadium; Attendance: 10,442; Referee: Koichiro Fukushima
	Penalties
	Yuki Soma (penalty scored); Yuta Nakayama (penalty scored); Hokuto Shimoda (penalty scored); Ibrahim Drešević (penalty scored)		Koshi Osaki (penalty scored); Yuto Yamashita (penalty missed); Kishin Gokita (penalty scored); Yuto Nagao (penalty missed)

21 February 3	Tokyo Verdy	2–2 (4–3 p)	Machida Zelvia	Chōfu
	Hiroto Yamami 89'; Taiju Yoshida 90+4'	Report	Yuki Soma 69'; Yūta Nakayama 80'; Erik (yellow card) 74'	Stadium: Ajinomoto Stadium; Attendance: 15,956; Referee: Akihiko Ikeuchi
	Penalties
	Itsuki Someno (penalty scored); Hiroto Yamami (penalty missed); Ryosuke Shirai (penalty scored); Yuta Arai (penalty scored); Koki Morita (penalty scored)		Yūta Nakayama (penalty scored); Hokuto Shimoda (penalty scored); Ibrahim Drešević (penalty scored); Kanji Kuwayama (penalty missed); Takuma Nishimura (penalty missed)

27 February 4	Machida Zelvia	2–1	JEF United Chiba	Tokyo
	Yuki Soma 5'; Erik 59'; Daihachi Okamura (yellow card) 51'; Hotaka Nakamura (yellow card) 90+1'	Report	Daichi Ishikawa 64'; Yuma Igari (yellow card) 87'	Stadium: Machida GION Stadium; Attendance: 8,015; Referee: Hayato Shimizu

28 March 5 (Rescheduled)	Machida Zelvia	1–1 (3–1 p)	Kawasaki Frontale	Tokyo
	Erik 41' (red card) 78'; Hiroyuki Mae (yellow card) 90+4'	Report	Erison 59'	Stadium: Machida GION Stadium; Attendance: 11,316; Referee: Masuya Ueda
	Penalties
	Yuki Soma (penalty scored); Yuta Nakayama (penalty missed); Na Sang-ho (penalty scored); Ibrahim Drešević (penalty scored)		Lazar Romanić (penalty missed); Yuki Yamamoto (penalty scored); Yu Kobayashi (penalty missed); So Kawahara (penalty missed)

14 March 6	Kashiwa Reysol	0–1	Machida Zelvia	Chiba
	Seiya Baba (yellow card) 73'	Report	Tete Yengi 28'; Kotaro Hayashi (yellow card) 83'	Stadium: Sankyo Frontier Kashiwa Stadium; Attendance: 12,538; Referee: Koei Koya

18 March 7	Machida Zelvia	0–3	Kashima Antlers	Tokyo
	Yūta Nakayama (yellow card) 42'; Na Sang-ho (yellow card) 45+2'	Report	Yuma Suzuki 5'; Kento Misao 45'; Aleksandar Čavrić 90'	Stadium: Machida GION Stadium; Attendance: 42,218; Referee: Koichiro Fukushima

22 March 8	Urawa Red Diamonds	1–2	Machida Zelvia	Saitama
	Matheus Savio 56'; Takuya Ogiwara (yellow card) 9'; Isaac Thelin (yellow card) 90+5'	Report	Henry Heroki Mochizuki 27'; Yuki Soma 82' (pen.); Kotaro Hayashi (yellow card) 10'; Daihachi Okamura (yellow card) 90'	Stadium: Saitama Stadium 2002; Attendance: 34,782; Referee: Futoshi Nakamura

5 April 9	FC Tokyo	0–0 (2–4 p)	Machida Zelvia	Chōfu
		Report	Daihachi Okamura (yellow card) 40'	Stadium: Ajinomoto Stadium; Attendance: 28,760; Referee: Hiroki Kasahara
	Penalties
	Alexander Scholz (penalty missed); Fūki Yamada (penalty scored); Ko Takahiro (penalty missed); Kento Hashimoto (penalty scored)		Yūta Nakayama (penalty scored); Na Sang-ho (penalty scored); Hokuto Shimoda (penalty scored); Ibrahim Drešević (penalty scored)

11 April 10	Machida Zelvia	1–0	Kashiwa Reysol	Tokyo
	Na Sang-ho 76'	Report		Stadium: Machida GION Stadium; Attendance: 11,325; Referee: Atsushi Kamimura

1 April 11 (Rescheduled)	Machida Zelvia	0–3	FC Tokyo	Tokyo
	Gen Shoji (yellow card) 23'	Report	Keito Endo 32'; Kein Sato 65', 78' (pen.); Kento Hashimoto (yellow card) 57'	Stadium: Machida GION Stadium; Attendance: 5,851; Referee: Koji Takasaki

13 May 12 (Rescheduled)	Machida Zelvia	0–0 (4–2 p)	Tokyo Verdy	Tokyo
		Report	Yosuke Uchida (yellow card) 63'	Stadium: Machida GION Stadium; Attendance: 7,624; Referee: Hayato Shimizu
	Penalties
	Na Sang-ho (penalty scored); Yūta Nakayama (penalty scored); Ibrahim Drešević (penalty scored); Hokuto Shimoda (penalty scored)		Itsuki Someno (penalty scored); Yuya Fukuda (penalty missed); Yuta Arai (penalty scored); Tetsuyuki Inami (penalty missed)

29 April 13	Mito HollyHock	2–2 (3–4 p)	Machida Zelvia	Ibaraki
	Henry Heroki Mochizuki 68' (o.g.); Koki Ando 90'	Report	Hokuto Shimoda 17'; Ibrahim Dreševic 48'; Kanji Kuwayama (yellow card) 89'	Stadium: K's denki Stadium Mito; Attendance: 7,229; Referee: Fu Ming (China)
	Penalties
	Koshi Osaki (penalty scored); Keisuke Tada (penalty scored); Sho Omori (penalty scored); Kenta Itakura (penalty missed); Patryck (penalty missed)		Hokuto Shimoda (penalty scored); Ibrahim Drešević (penalty scored); Erik (penalty scored); Kosei Tani (penalty scored)

3 May 14	Kashima Antlers	1–1 (4–2 p)	Machida Zelvia	Tokyo
	Léo Ceará 50'	Report	Tete Yengi 53' (yellow card) 41'; Neta Lavi (yellow card) 49'; Kotaro Hayashi (yellow card) 56'; Hiroyuki Mae (yellow card) 90+4'	Stadium: Japan National Stadium; Attendance: 31,742; Referee: Akihiko Ikeuchi
	Penalties
	Kyosuke Tagawa (penalty scored); Yuma Suzuki (penalty scored); Ryoya Ogawa (penalty scored); Léo Ceará (penalty scored)		Hokuto Shimoda (penalty missed); Ibrahim Drešević (penalty scored); Kosei Tani (penalty scored); Hiroyuki Mae (penalty missed)

6 May 15	Machida Zelvia	2–0	Yokohama F. Marinos	Tokyo
	Erik 54'; Shota Fujio 67'; Daihachi Okamura (yellow card) 40'	Report		Stadium: Machida GION Stadium; Attendance: 13,616; Referee: Hiroyuki Kimura

10 May 16	JEF United Chiba	0–2	Machida Zelvia	Chiba
	Makoto Himeno (yellow card) 65'	Report	Na Sang-ho 7', 36'	Stadium: Fukuda Denshi Arena; Attendance: 12,495; Referee: Yoshimi Yamashita

17 May 17	Kawasaki Frontale	1–1 (5–4 p)	Machida Zelvia	Kawasaki
	Yasuto Wakizaka 88' (pen.); Lazar Romanic (yellow card) 28'	Report	Tete Yengi 40'; Neta Lavi (yellow card) 90+6'	Stadium: Kawasaki Todoroki Stadium; Attendance: 20,889; Referee: Yusuke Araki
	Penalties
	Yasuto Wakizaka (penalty scored); Yuichi Maruyama (penalty scored); Yuki Yamamoto (penalty missed); Asahi Sasaki (penalty scored); Reon Yamahara (penalty scored); Kyosuke Mochiyama (penalty scored)		Ibrahim Drešević (penalty scored); Yuta Nakayama (penalty missed); Shuto Fujio (penalty scored); Kosei Tani (penalty scored); Neta Lavi (penalty scored); Keiya Sento (penalty missed)

22 May 18	Machida Zelvia	1–0	Urawa Red Diamonds	Tokyo
	Erik 8'	Report	Yoichi Naganuma (yellow card) 45'	Stadium: Machida GION Stadium; Attendance: 44,871; Referee: Futoshi Nakamura

30 May Placement Leg 1	Nagoya Grampus	2–2	Machida Zelvia	Toyota
	Yudai Kimura 10'; Tomoki Takamine 90+2'	Report	Hokuto Shimoda 6' (yellow card) 21'; Erik 77' (yellow card) 79'; Hiroyuki Mae (yellow card) 31'; Gen Shoji (yellow card) 90'	Stadium: Toyota Stadium; Attendance: 26,656; Referee: Hiroyuki Kimura

6 June Placement Leg 2	Machida Zelvia	2–1 (a.e.t.) (4–3 agg.)	Nagoya Grampus	Tokyo
	Yuta Nakayama 100'; Hokuto Shimoda 118'; Gen Shoji (yellow card) 1'; Erik (yellow card) 55'; Hiroyuki Mae (yellow card) 59'	Report	Kensuke Nagai 93'; Tomoki Takamine (penalty missed) 45+1 (yellow card) 82' (yellow-red card) 90+7'; Yudai Kimura (yellow card) 17'	Stadium: Machida GION Stadium; Attendance: 10,230; Referee: Koji Takasaki

=== AFC Champions League ===
==== League stage ====
Win Draw Loss

16 September 2025 MD 1	Machida Zelvia (Japan)	1–1	(South Korea) FC Seoul	Machida, Japan
	Henry Hiroki Mochizuki 80'	Report	Marko Dugandžić 59'; Kim Jin-su (yellow card) 82'	Stadium: Machida GION Stadium; Attendance: 4,798; Referee: Asker Nadjafaliev (Uzbekistan)

30 September 2025 MD 2	Johor Darul Ta'zim (Malaysia)	0–0	(Japan) Machida Zelvia	Johor, Malaysia
	Afiq Fazail (yellow card) 30'	Report	Yuki Soma (penalty missed) 23	Stadium: Sultan Ibrahim Stadium; Attendance: 28,915; Referee: Kim Jong-hyeok (South Korea)

21 October 2025 MD 3	Shanghai Port (China)	0–2	(Japan) Machida Zelvia	Shanghai, China
	Matheus Jussa (yellow card) 88'	Report	Fu Huan 12' (o.g.); Yuki Soma 25' (yellow card) 48'	Stadium: Pudong Football Stadium; Attendance: 10,197; Referee: Ahmed Issa (United Arab Emirates)

4 November 2025 MD 4	Machida Zelvia (Japan)	1–2	(Australia) Melbourne City	Machida, Japan
	Henry Hiroki Mochizuki 24'; Yuta Nakayama (yellow card) 55'	Report	Gen Shoji 1' (o.g.); Andrew Nabbout 90+4'	Stadium: Machida GION Stadium; Attendance: 4,401; Referee: Abdulla Al-Marri (Qatar)

25 November 2025 MD 5	Gangwon FC (South Korea)	1–3	(Japan) Machida Zelvia	Gangneung, South Korea
	Park Ho-Yeong 55'; Lee Seung-won (yellow card) 27'	Report	Keiya Sento 24'; Hokuto Shimoda 28'; Oh Se-hun 39'; Yuta Nakayama (yellow card) 76'	Stadium: Gangneung Stadium; Attendance: 3,502; Referee: Khalid Saleh Al-Turais (Saudi Arabia)

9 December 2025 MD 6	Machida Zelvia (Japan)	3–1	(South Korea) Ulsan HD FC	Machida, Japan
	Asahi Masuyama 6'; Takuma Nishimura 21'; Oh Se-Hun 46'	Report	Um Won-Sang 55'; Jung Seung-Hyun (yellow card) 34'	Stadium: Machida GION Stadium; Attendance: 4,345; Referee: Nazmi Nasaruddin (Malaysia)

10 February 2026 MD 7	Shanghai Shenhua (China)	0–2	(Japan) Machida Zelvia	Shanghai, China
	Jin Shunkai (yellow card) 2'; Makhtar Gueye (yellow card) 34'	Report	Yuki Soma 3' (pen.), 88'	Stadium: Shanghai Stadium; Attendance: 16,158; Referee: Omar Al-Ali (United Arab Emirates)

17 February 2026 MD 8	Machida Zelvia (Japan)	3–2	(China) Chengdu Rongcheng	Machida, Japan
	Tete Yengi 7', 55'; Ryōhei Shirasaki 25'; Daihachi Okamura (yellow card) 67'	Report	Wei Shihao 32'; Felipe 90'; Ming-yang Yang (yellow card) 10'	Stadium: Machida GION Stadium; Referee: Alireza Faghani (Australia)

Pos	Team	Pld	W	D	L	GF	GA	GD	Pts	Qualification
1	(Japan) Machida Zelvia	8	5	2	1	15	7	+8	17	Advance to round of 16
2	(Japan) Vissel Kobe	8	5	1	2	14	7	+7	16	Advance to round of 16
3	(Japan) Sanfrecce Hiroshima	8	4	3	1	10	6	+4	15	Advance to round of 16
4	(Thailand) Buriram United	8	4	2	2	10	8	+2	14	Advance to round of 16
5	(Australia) Melbourne City	8	4	2	2	9	7	+2	14	Advance to round of 16

Source: AFC
Rules for classification: 1) points; 2) goal difference; 3) number of goals scored; 4) number of matches won; 5) penalty shoot-out if only two teams remain tied and played each other on the final matchday 6) fair play ranking; 7) drawing of lots

==== Knockout stage ====
3 March 2026 R16 Leg 1	Gangwon FC (South Korea)	0–0	(Japan) Machida Zelvia	Gangneung, South Korea
	Seo Min-Woo (yellow card) 31'; Mo Jae-Hyeon (yellow card) 52'	Report	Hotaka Nakamura (yellow card) 24'	Stadium: Gangneung Stadium; Attendance: 2,675; Referee: Ahmad A'Qashah (Singapore)

10 March 2025 R16 Leg 2	Machida Zelvia (Japan)	1–0 (1–0 agg.)	(South Korea) Gangwon FC	Machida, Japan
	Hotaka Nakamura 25'; Neta Lavi (yellow card) 37'; Ryōhei Shirasaki (yellow card) 79'	Report	Lee You-Hyeon (yellow card) 45+1'	Stadium: Machida GION Stadium; Attendance: 4,345; Referee: Rustam Lutfullin (Uzbekistan)

17 April 2026 Quarter Final	Machida Zelvia (Japan)	1–0	(Saudi Arabia) Al-Ittihad	Jeddah, Saudi Arabia
	Tete Yengi 33' (yellow card) 86'; Kotaro Hayashi (yellow card) 62'; Neta Lavi (yellow card) 77'	Report	Mario Mitaj (yellow card) 23'; Abdulrahman Al-Oboud (yellow card) 77'; Danilo Pereira (yellow card) 90'	Stadium: Prince Abdullah Al-Faisal Sports City Stadium; Attendance: 16,917; Referee: Ma Ning (China)

22 April 2026 Semi Final	Machida Zelvia (Japan)	1–0	(United Arab Emirates) Shabab Al Ahli	Jeddah, Saudi Arabia
	Yuki Soma 13' (yellow card) 90+4'; Shōta Fujio (yellow card) 74'	Report	Federico Cartabia (yellow card) 88'; Paulo Sousa (yellow card) 48'; Igor Gomes (yellow card) FT; Renan (yellow card) FT; Hamad Al Meqbaali (red card) FT	Stadium: Prince Abdullah Al-Faisal Sports City Stadium; Attendance: 395; Referee: Shaun Evans (Australia)

26 April 2026 Final	Al-Ahli (Saudi Arabia)	1–0 (a.e.t.)	(Japan) Machida Zelvia	Jeddah, Saudi Arabia
	Feras Al Brikan 95'; Enzo Millot (yellow card) 58'; Zakaria Al Hawsawi (red card) 69'; Mohammed Abdulrahman (red card) 90+5'; Édouard Mendy (yellow card) 118'	Report	Tete Yengi (yellow card) 71'	Stadium: King Abdullah Sports City Stadium; Referee: Ilgiz Tantashev (Uzbekistan)

== Team statistics ==
=== Appearances and goals ===
As of 6 June 2026

No.	Pos.	Player	J1 League		2025/26 AFC Champions League Elite		Total	
No.	Pos.	Player	Apps.	Goals	Apps.	Goals	Apps.	Goals
1	GK	(Japan) Kosei Tani	20	0	6	0	26	0
2	DF	(Japan) Tomoki Imai	0	0	0	0	0	0
3	DF	(Japan) Gen Shoji	18+1	1	6	0	25	1
4	MF	(Japan) Ryuho Kikuchi	0	0	0	0	0	0
5	DF	(Kosovo) (Sweden) Ibrahim Drešević	9+5	1	1+1	0	16	1
6	DF	(Japan) (Nigeria) Henry Hiroki Mochizuki	6+3	1	4+3	0	16	1
7	MF	(Japan) Yuki Soma	10+2	4	5+1	3	18	7
8	MF	(Japan) Keiya Sento	4+9	0	1+3	0	17	0
9	FW	(Japan) Shōta Fujio	6+11	1	1+5	0	23	1
10	FW	(South Korea) Na Sang-ho	10+7	3	3+2	0	22	3
11	MF	(Japan) Asahi Masuyama	4+3	0	1	0	8	0
13	GK	(Japan) Tatsuya Morita	0	0	1	0	1	0
16	MF	(Japan) Hiroyuki Mae	11+5	0	4+2	0	22	0
17	GK	(Japan) (Myanmar) Kaung Zan Mara	0	0	0	0	0	0
18	MF	(Japan) Hokuto Shimoda	4+8	2	2+3	0	17	2
19	DF	(Japan) Yūta Nakayama	15+2	2	6+1	0	24	2
20	FW	(Japan) Takuma Nishimura	2+1	0	0+3	0	6	0
22	FW	(Japan) Takaya Numata	0+1	0	0	0	1	0
23	MF	(Japan) Ryōhei Shirasaki	9+6	0	2+1	1	18	1
24	DF	(South Korea) Kim Min-tae	1	0	0	0	1	0
26	DF	(Japan) Kotaro Hayashi	13+5	0	6+1	0	25	0
27	FW	(Brazil) Erik	15+3	8	3	0	21	8
28	MF	(South Korea) Cha Je-hoon	0	0	0	0	0	0
31	MF	(Israel) (Portugal) Neta Lavi	12+2	0	5+1	0	20	0
34	MF	(Japan) Futa Tokumura	5+5	0	1+1	0	12	0
38	MF	(Japan) Tenshiro Takasaki	0	0	0	0	0	0
39	MF	(Chile) (Japan) Byron Vásquez	0+2	0	0	0	2	0
44	GK	(Japan) Yoshiaki Arai	0	0	0	0	0	0
49	MF	(Japan) Kanji Kuwayama	0+8	0	1+2	0	11	0
50	DF	(Japan) Daihachi Okamura	17	0	6+1	0	24	0
55	GK	(Japan) (United States) Anton Burns	0	0	0	0	0	0
77	DF	(Japan) Takumi Narasaka	0	0	0	0	0	0
88	DF	(Japan) Hotaka Nakamura	16+1	2	6	0	23	2
99	FW	(Australia) (South Sudan) (England) Tete Yengi	12+3	3	6+1	3	22	6
Players featured on a match for the team, but left the club mid-season, either permanently or on loan transfer
