= 2026 AFC Champions League Elite final =

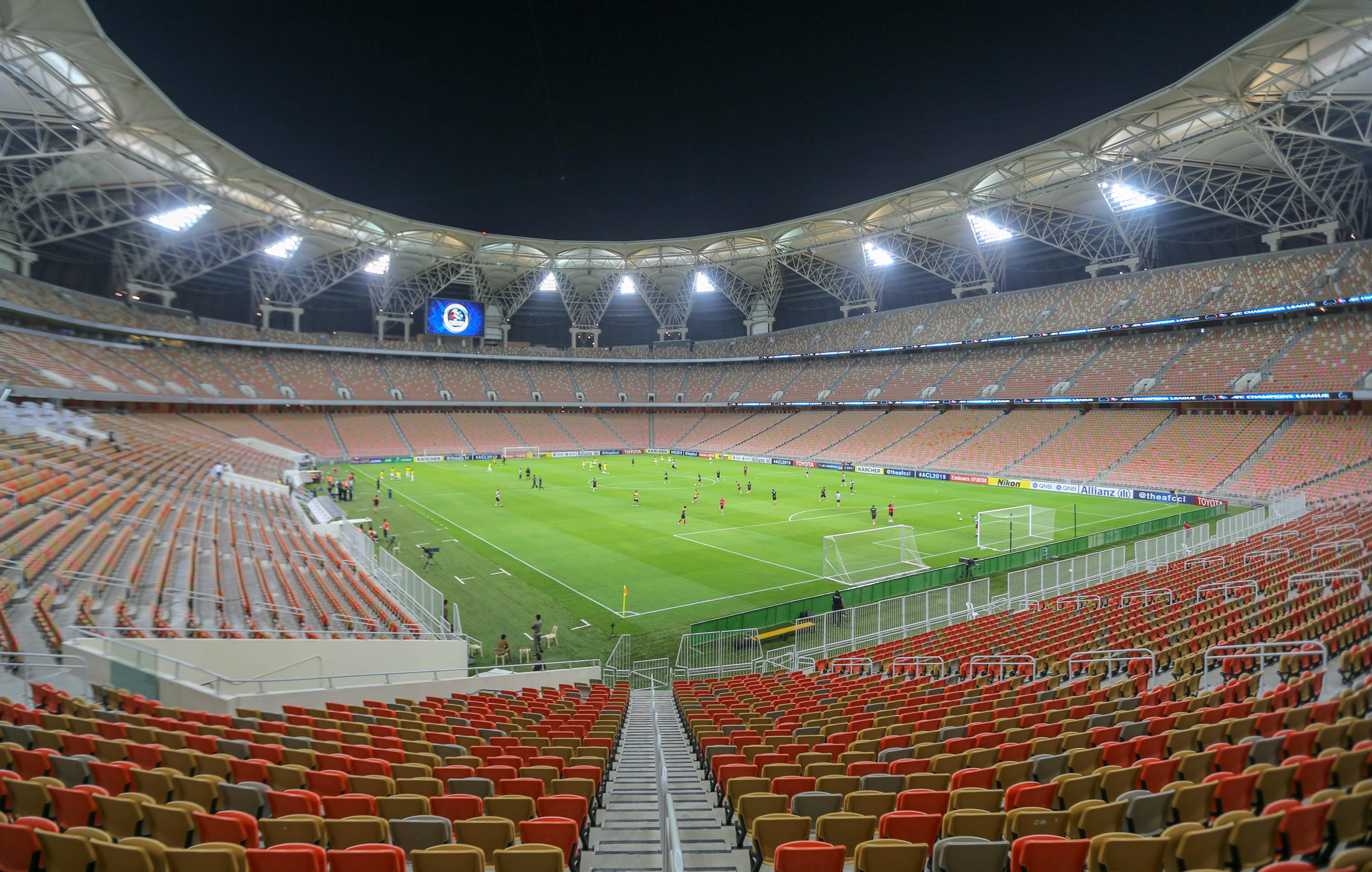
- The King Abdullah Sports City Stadium in Jeddah hosted the final.
- Event: Champions League Elite
Al-Ahli	Machida Zelvia
(Saudi Arabia)	(Japan)
1	0
- After extra time
- Date: 25 April 2026
- Venue: King Abdullah Sports City Stadium, Jeddah
- Referee: Ilgiz Tantashev (Uzbekistan)
- Attendance: 58,984

The 2026 AFC Champions League Elite final was the final match of the 2025–26 AFC Champions League Elite, the 44th season of Asia's premier club football tournament organised by the Asian Football Confederation (AFC), and the second since it was rebranded as the AFC Champions League Elite. It was played at King Abdullah Sports City Stadium in Jeddah, Saudi Arabia, on 25 April 2026 between defending champions and finals hosts Al-Ahli and Japanese club Machida Zelvia, in their first continental final.

Al-Ahli won 1–0 after extra time, making it the first final since 2011 to go to extra time, and claimed their second Champions League title.

== Teams ==
In the following table, the finals until 2002 were in the Asian Club Championship era, and from 2003 to 2024 were in the AFC Champions League era.

Team	Region (Federation)	Previous finals appearances (bold indicates winners)
(Saudi Arabia) Al-Ahli	West (WAFF)	3 (1985–86, 2012, **2025**)
(Japan) Machida Zelvia	East (EAFF)	None

== Road to the final ==
Note: In all results below, the score of the finalist is given first. (H: home; A: away; N: neutral).

(Saudi Arabia) Al-Ahli		Round	(Japan) Machida Zelvia	
Opponents	Results	League stage	Opponents	Results
(Uzbekistan) Nasaf	4–2 (H)	Match 1	(South Korea) FC Seoul	1–1 (H)
(Qatar) Al-Duhail	2–2 (A)	Match 2	(Malaysia) Johor Darul Ta'zim	0–0 (A)
(Qatar) Al-Gharafa	4–0 (H)	Match 3	(China) Shanghai Port	2–0 (A)
(Qatar) Al Sadd	2–1 (A)	Match 4	(Australia) Melbourne City	1–2 (H)
(United Arab Emirates) Sharjah	0–1 (H)	Match 5	(South Korea) Gangwon FC	3–1 (A)
(Iraq) Al-Shorta	5–0 (A)	Match 6	(South Korea) Ulsan HD	3–1 (H)
(United Arab Emirates) Al Wahda	0–0 (A)	Match 7	(China) Shanghai Shenhua	2–0 (A)
(United Arab Emirates) Shabab Al Ahli	4–3 (H)	Match 8	(China) Chengdu Rongcheng	3–2 (H)
**West region, 2nd place**: Pos / Team / Pld / Pts; 1 / (Saudi Arabia) Al Hilal / 8 / **22**; **2** / (Saudi Arabia) Al-Ahli / **8** / **17**; 3 / (Iran) Tractor / 8 / **17**; 4 / (Saudi Arabia) Al-Ittihad / 8 / **15**; 5 / (United Arab Emirates) Al Wahda / 8 / **14**; Source: AFC		Final standings	**East Region, 1st place**: Pos / Team / Pld / Pts; **1** / (Japan) Machida Zelvia / **8** / **17**; 2 / (Japan) Vissel Kobe / 8 / **16**; 3 / (Japan) Sanfrecce Hiroshima / 8 / **15**; 4 / (Thailand) Buriram United / 8 / **14**; 5 / (Australia) Melbourne City / 8 / **14**; Source: AFC	
Opponents	Results	Knockout stage	Opponents	Results
(Qatar) Al-Duhail	1–0 (a.e.t.) (H)	Round of 16	(South Korea) Gangwon FC	1–0 (0–0, 1–0) (A, H)
(Malaysia) Johor Darul Ta'zim	2–1 (A)	Quarter-finals	(Saudi Arabia) Al-Ittihad	1–0 (A)
(Japan) Vissel Kobe	2–1 (H)	Semi-finals	(United Arab Emirates) Shabab Al Ahli	1–0 (N)

== Match ==
=== Details ===
25 April 2026
19:15 UTC+3

Al-Ahli (Saudi Arabia)	1–0 (a.e.t.)	(Japan) Machida Zelvia
Al-Buraikan 96'	Report

King Abdullah Sports City Stadium, Jeddah
Attendance: 58,984
Referee: Ilgiz Tantashev (Uzbekistan)

**Al-Ahli**	**Machida Zelvia**

GK	16	(Senegal) Édouard Mendy (c)	(yellow card) 118'
RB	46	(Saudi Arabia) Rayan Hamed		(substituted off) 111'
CB	28	(Turkey) Merih Demiral
CB	3	(Brazil) Roger Ibañez
LB	2	(Saudi Arabia) Zakaria Hawsawi	(red card) 68'
CM	6	(France) Valentin Atangana
CM	79	(Ivory Coast) Franck Kessié
RW	7	(Algeria) Riyad Mahrez		(substituted off) 114'
AM	10	(France) Enzo Millot	(yellow card) 57'	(substituted off) 62'
LW	13	(Brazil) Galeno
CF	17	(England) Ivan Toney		(substituted off) 120+1'
Substitutes:
GK	1	(Saudi Arabia) Abdulrahman Al-Sanbi
GK	62	(Saudi Arabia) Abdullah Abdoh
DF	5	(Saudi Arabia) Mohammed Sulaiman		(substituted on) 111'
DF	29	(Saudi Arabia) Mohammed Abdulrahman	(red card) 90+5'
DF	32	(Belgium) Matteo Dams
DF	60	(Saudi Arabia) Yazan Madani
MF	14	(Saudi Arabia) Eid Al-Muwallad
MF	20	(Brazil) Matee
MF	30	(Saudi Arabia) Ziyad Al-Johani		(substituted on) 114'
MF	47	(Saudi Arabia) Saleh Abu Al-Shamat
FW	9	(Saudi Arabia) Firas Al-Buraikan		(substituted on) 62'
FW	77	(Brazil) Ricardo Mathias		(substituted on) 120+1'
Manager:
(Germany) Matthias Jaissle

GK	1	(Japan) Kōsei Tani
CB	3	(Japan) Gen Shoji (c)		(substituted off) 105'
CB	50	(Japan) Daihachi Okamura
CB	19	(Japan) Yūta Nakayama		(substituted off) 90+7'
RM	88	(Japan) Hotaka Nakamura		(substituted off) 99'
CM	16	(Japan) Hiroyuki Mae
CM	31	(Israel) Neta Lavi		(substituted off) 89'
LM	26	(Japan) Kotaro Hayashi
AM	99	(Australia) Tete Yengi	(yellow card) 70'	(substituted off) 89'
CF	27	(Brazil) Erik		(substituted off) 62'
CF	7	(Japan) Yūki Sōma
Substitutes:
GK	13	(Japan) Tatsuya Morita
GK	44	(Japan) Yoshiaki Arai
DF	5	(Kosovo) Ibrahim Drešević		(substituted on) 90+7'
DF	6	(Japan) Henry Heroki Mochizuki		(substituted on) 99'
MF	8	(Japan) Keiya Sento		(substituted on) 105'
MF	11	(Japan) Asahi Masuyama
MF	18	(Japan) Hokuto Shimoda		(substituted on) 89'
MF	23	(Japan) Ryohei Shirasaki
FW	9	(Japan) Shōta Fujio		(substituted on) 89'
FW	10	(South Korea) Na Sang-ho		(substituted on) 62'
FW	34	(Japan) Futa Tokumura
FW	49	(Japan) Kanji Kuwayama
Manager:
(Japan) Go Kuroda

Assistant referees:
Andrey Tsapenko (Uzbekistan)
Zhou Fei (China)
Fourth official:
Ma Ning (China)
Reserve assistant referee:
Mohammad Al-Kalaf (Jordan)
Video assistant referee:
Muhammad Taqi (Singapore)
Assistant video assistant referee:
Firdaus Nosafarov (Uzbekistan)
Support video assistant referee:
Subkhiddin Mohd Salleh (Malaysia)

**Match rules**

- 90 minutes
- 30 minutes of extra time if necessary
- Penalty shoot-out if scores still level
- Maximum of twelve named substitutes
- Maximum of five substitutions, with a sixth allowed in extra time
- Maximum of three substitution opportunities, with a fourth allowed in extra time

== See also ==
- 2026 AFC Champions League Two final
- 2026 AFC Challenge League final
- 2026 AFC Women's Champions League final
- 2026 Al-Ahli Saudi FC season
- 2026 FC Machida Zelvia season
