= Ibrahim Drešević =

Footballer (born 1997)

Personal information
- Date of birth: 24 January 1997 (age 29)
- Place of birth: Fuxerna, Sweden
- Height: 1.86 m (6 ft 1 in)
- Position: Centre-back

Team information
- Current team: Machida Zelvia
- Number: 5

Youth career
- 2010–2011: Norrby
- 2011–2016: Elfsborg

Senior career*
Years	Team	Apps	(Gls)
2016–2019	Elfsborg	31	(0)
2019–2022	Heerenveen	89	(2)
2022–2024	Fatih Karagümrük	48	(1)
2024–	Machida Zelvia	78	(5)

International career^{‡}
2014	Sweden U17	2	(0)
2014–2017	Sweden U19	11	(1)
2019–	Kosovo	25	(0)
- * Club domestic league appearances and goals as of 6 June 2026 ‡ National team caps and goals as of 12 September 2023

Ibrahim Drešević (Albanian: Ibrahim Dreshaj; born 24 January 1997) is a professional footballer who plays as a centre-back for J1 League club Machida Zelvia. Born in Sweden, he represented that nation at youth international levels but in 2019 switched to play for Kosovo national team.

== Club career ==
=== Elfsborg ===
His debut with Elfsborg came on 25 August 2016 in a 0–7 biggest away win in the second round of 2016–17 Svenska Cupen against IK Gauthiod after coming on as a substitute in the 61st minute in place of Joakim Nilsson. Drešević made his first Allsvenskan appearance on 10 September after being named in the starting line-up in a 1–1 home draw against Kalmar.

=== Heerenveen ===
On 31 January 2019, Drešević signed a three-and-a-half-year contract with Eredivisie club Heerenveen. His debut with Heerenveen came sixteen days later in a 2–2 home draw against PSV after coming on as a substitute in the 79th minute in place of Jizz Hornkamp.

=== Fatih Karagümrük ===
On 24 June 2022, Drešević signed a two-year contract with Süper Lig club Fatih Karagümrük. His debut with Fatih Karagümrük came on 21 August in a 4–1 away defeat against Beşiktaş after being named in the starting line-up.

=== Machida Zelvia ===
On 18 January 2024, Drešević was announced at Machida Zelvia.

== International career ==
=== Youth ===
From 2014, until 2017, Drešević has been part of Sweden at youth international level, respectively has been part of the U17 and U19 teams and he with these teams played thirteen matches and scored one goal.

=== Senior ===
On 22 May 2019, Drešević received a call-up from Kosovo for the UEFA Euro 2020 qualifying matches against Montenegro and Bulgaria, but he was not available for these matches after FIFA did not permit him to play for Kosovo due to problems with his documentation. On 23 August 2019, FIFA gave permission for Drešević to play for Kosovo. His debut with Kosovo came on 10 October 2019 in a friendly match against Gibraltar after being named in the starting line-up.

== Personal life ==
Drešević was born in Fuxerna, Lilla Edet, Sweden, to Albanian parents from Tuzi, Montenegro.

== Career statistics ==
=== Club ===
As of match played 6 June 2026

Appearances and goals by club, season and competition
Club	Season	League			Cup		League cup		Continental		Other		Total	
Club	Season	Division	Apps	Goals	Apps	Goals	Apps	Goals	Apps	Goals	Apps	Goals	Apps	Goals
Elfsborg	2016	Allsvenskan	2	0	1	0	—		—		—		3	0
Elfsborg	2017	Allsvenskan	6	0	2	1	—		—		—		8	1
Elfsborg	2018	Allsvenskan	23	0	0	0	—		—		—		23	0
Elfsborg	Total		31	0	3	1	—		—		—		34	1
Heerenveen	2018–19	Eredivisie	6	0	0	0	—		—		4 (Note: Appearance(s) with Heerenveen U21)	0	10	0
Heerenveen	2019–20	Eredivisie	26	2	4	0	—		—		—		30	2
Heerenveen	2020–21	Eredivisie	30	0	4	0	—		—		—		34	0
Heerenveen	2021–22	Eredivisie	27	0	3	0	—		—		2 (Note: Appearance(s) in the European play-offs of 2021–22 Eredivisie)	0	32	0
Heerenveen	Total		89	2	11	0	—		—		6	0	106	2
Fatih Karagümrük	2022–23	Süper Lig	32	1	3	0	—		—		—		35	1
Fatih Karagümrük	2023–24	Süper Lig	16	0	1	1	—		—		—		17	1
Fatih Karagümrük	Total		48	1	4	1	—		—		—		52	2
Machida Zelvia	2024	J1 League	31	3	0	0	5	0	—		—		36	3
Machida Zelvia	2025	J1 League	33	1	5	0	2	0	5 (Note: Appearance(s) in AFC Champions League Elite)	0	—		45	1
Machida Zelvia	2026	J1 (100)	14	1	—		—		3	0	—		17	1
Machida Zelvia	Total		78	5	5	0	7	0	8	0	—		98	5
Career total			246	8	23	2	7	0	8	0	6	0	290	10

=== International ===
As of 12 September 2023

Appearances and goals by national team and year
National team	Year	Apps	Goals
Kosovo
Kosovo	2019	2	0
Kosovo	2020	5	0
Kosovo	2021	7	0
Kosovo	2022	7	0
Kosovo	2023	4	0
Total		25	0

== Honours ==
=== Club ===
Machida Zelvia

- Emperor's Cup: 2025
