= Kazuki Fujimoto =

Japanese footballer

Kazuki Fujimoto 藤本 一輝
Personal information
- Date of birth: 29 July 1998 (age 28)
- Place of birth: Fukuoka, Fukuoka, Japan
- Height: 1.79 m (5 ft 10 in)
- Position: Forward

Team information
- Current team: Avispa Fukuoka
- Number: 22

Youth career
- Aburayama Camellia FC
- 2011–2013: Sagan Tosu
- 2014–2016: Fujieda Meisei High School

College career
Years	Team	Apps	(Gls)
2017–2020	NIFS Kanoya		

Senior career*
Years	Team	Apps	(Gls)
2020–2023	Oita Trinita	77	(10)
2024	FC Machida Zelvia	36	(3)
2025–	Avispa Fukuoka	49	(2)
- * Club domestic league appearances and goals as of 12 August 2026

Kazuki Fujimoto (藤本 一輝, Fujimoto Kazuki; born 29 July 1998) is a Japanese footballer currently playing as a forward for J1 League club Avispa Fukuoka.

== Career statistics ==
=== Club ===
As of end of 2024 season.

Appearances and goals by club, season and competition
Club	Season	League			National Cup		League Cup		Other		Total	
Club	Season	Division	Apps	Goals	Apps	Goals	Apps	Goals	Apps	Goals	Apps	Goals
Japan			League		Emperor's Cup		J. League Cup		Other		Total	
NIFS Kanoya	2019	–			3	1	–		–		3	1
NIFS Kanoya	2020	–			3	0	–		–		3	0
NIFS Kanoya	Total		0	0	6	1	0	0	0	0	6	1
Oita Trinita	2020	J1 League	5	0	0	0	1	0	–		6	0
Oita Trinita	2021	J1 League	10	0	4	1	5	1	–		19	2
Oita Trinita	2022	J2 League	23	4	1	0	4	0	1 (Note: Appearance in J1/J2 playoffs)	0	29	4
Oita Trinita	2023	J2 League	39	6	1	0	–		–		40	6
Oita Trinita	Total		77	10	6	1	10	1	1	0	94	12
Machida Zelvia	2024	J1 League	36	3	1	0	5	0	–		42	3
Career total			113	13	13	2	15	1	1	0	142	16
