= Kōki Fukui =

Japanese footballer

Kōki Fukui 福井 光輝
Personal information
- Full name: Kōki Fukui
- Date of birth: 4 November 1995 (age 31)
- Place of birth: Fujisawa, Kanagawa, Japan
- Height: 1.84 m (6 ft 1/2 in)
- Position: Goalkeeper

Team information
- Current team: Urawa Red Diamonds
- Number: 23

Youth career
- Meiji Freebirds SSS
- –2010: Shonan Bellmare
- 2011–2013: Shonan IT High School

College career
Years	Team	Apps	(Gls)
2014–2017	Nippon Sport Science University		

Senior career*
Years	Team	Apps	(Gls)
2018–2024	Machida Zelvia	129	(0)
2025–2026	Cerezo Osaka	30	(0)
2026–	Urawa Red Diamonds	0	(0)
- * Club domestic league appearances and goals as of 10 August 2026

Kōki Fukui (福井 光輝, Fukui Kōki; born November 4, 1995) is a Japanese professional footballer who plays as a goalkeeper for J1 League club Urawa Red Diamonds.

== Career ==
After attending Nippon Sport Science University, Fukui joined FC Machida Zelvia first as a special designated player and then as a top team member in 2018.

On 28 December 2024, Fukui was announced at J1 club Cerezo Osaka from the 2025 season.

== Career statistics ==
=== Club ===
As of match played 6 December 2025.

Appearances and goals by club, season and competition
Club	Season	League			Emperor's Cup		J.League Cup		Total	
Club	Season	Division	Apps	Goals	Apps	Goals	Apps	Goals	Apps	Goals
Machida Zelvia	2018	J2 League	29	0	0	0	—		29	0
Machida Zelvia	2019	J2 League	4	0	1	0	—		5	0
Machida Zelvia	2020	J2 League	13	0	0	0	—		13	0
Machida Zelvia	2021	J2 League	42	0	0	0	—		42	0
Machida Zelvia	2022	J2 League	28	0	1	0	—		29	0
Machida Zelvia	2023	J2 League	11	0	3	0	—		14	0
Machida Zelvia	2024	J1 League	2	0	0	0	5	0	7	0
Machida Zelvia	Total		129	0	5	0	5	0	139	0
Cerezo Osaka	2025	J1 League	30	0	0	0	1	0	31	0
Cerezo Osaka	2026	J1 (100)	0	0	—		—		0	0
Cerezo Osaka	Total		30	0	0	0	1	0	31	0
Urawa Red Diamonds	2026–27	J1 League	0	0	0	0	0	0	0	0
Career total			159	0	5	0	6	0	170	0

== Honours ==
FC Machida Zelvia

- J2 League: 2023
