= Byron Vásquez =

Chilean footballer (born 2000)

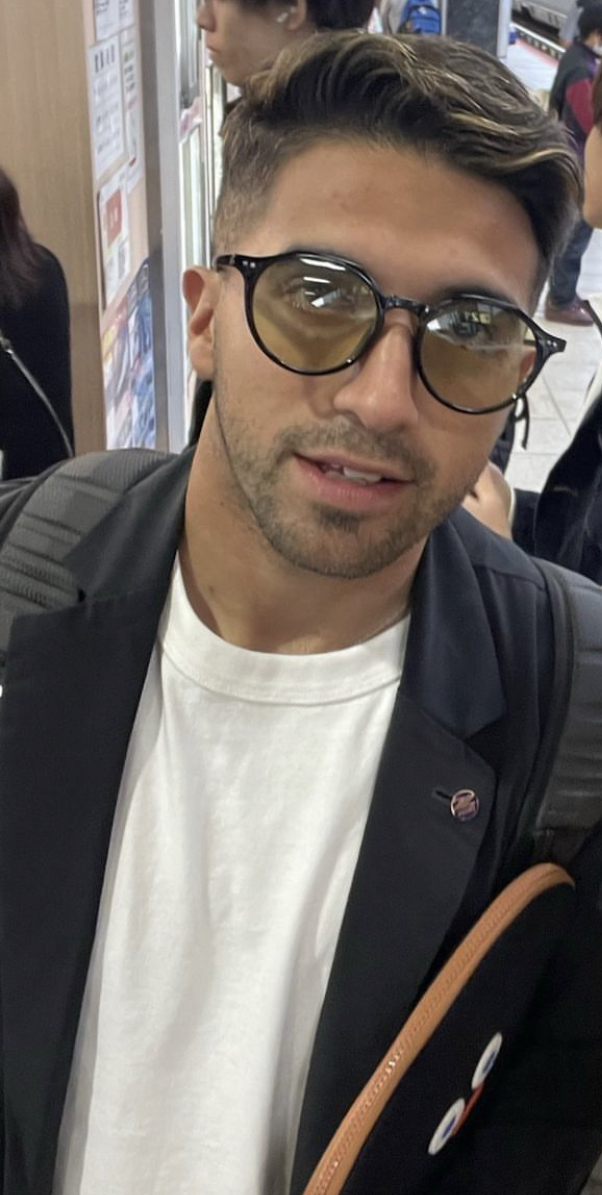
- 2024

Personal information
- Full name: Byron Gustavo Andrés Vásquez Maragaño
- Date of birth: 16 May 2000 (age 26)
- Place of birth: San Miguel, Chile
- Height: 1.75 m (5 ft 9 in)
- Position: Forward

Team information
- Current team: Tochigi City FC(on loan from Machida Zelvia)
- Number: 11

Youth career
- Shinmei Club
- –2015: Higashimatsuyama Pelenia
- 2016–2018: Aomori Yamada High School

Senior career*
Years	Team	Apps	(Gls)
2019–2021	Iwaki FC	24	(6)
2020	→ Universidad Católica (loan)	0	(0)
2022–2023	Tokyo Verdy	50	(6)
2023–	Machida Zelvia	31	(1)
2025	→ Tochigi City FC (loan)	14	(6)
2026–	→ Tochigi City FC (loan)	0	(0)
- * Club domestic league appearances and goals as of 16 August 2026

Byron Gustavo Andrés Vásquez Maragaño (born 16 May 2000), also known as Byron Vásquez, is a Chilean footballer who plays as a forward for Tochigi City FC, on loan from J1 League club Machida Zelvia.

== Career ==
Vásquez started his first career with Iwaki FC in 2019 after graduation from high school in two years, but returned in 2021 after loan to Chilean club.

In 2020, Vasquez loan to Chilean club, Universidad Catolica but he left the club after a season at Chile.

On 5 December 2021, he brought his club promotion to the J3 League as well as JFL champions for the first time in their respective history. 24 days later at same month and year, Vasquez signed to J2 club, Tokyo Verdy from Iwaki FC for upcoming 2022 season.

On 6 July 2023, Vasquez announcement officially permanent transfer to Machida Zelvia, where his high school teacher Go Kuroda is the manager.

On 21 August 2025, Vasquez announce official loan transfer to J3 League club, Tochigi City FC.

== Personal life ==
Vásquez was born in Chile but moved to Japan at an early age. On 16 May 2022, he announced his intention to acquire Japanese nationality through naturalization.

== Career statistics ==
=== Club ===
As of 25 March 2026.

Appearances and goals by club, season and competition
Club	Season	League			Cup		League Cup		Other		Total	
Club	Season	Division	Apps	Goals	Apps	Goals	Apps	Goals	Apps	Goals	Apps	Goals
Iwaki FC	2019	Tohoku Soccer League	10	5	0	0	–		11 (Note: Five appearances and two goals in the Shakaijin Cup, six appearances and three goals in the Japanese Regional Football League Competition)	5	21	10
Iwaki FC	2020	JFL	5	0	0	0	–				5	0
Iwaki FC	2021	JFL	9	1	1 (Note: Appearances in the Emperor's Cup)	0	–				10	1
Iwaki FC	Total		24	6	1	0	0	0	11	5	36	11
Universidad Católica (loan)	2020	Chilean Primera División	0	0	0	0	–				0	0
Tokyo Verdy	2022	J2 League	28	4	3	0	–				31	4
Tokyo Verdy	2023	J2 League	22	2	0	0	–				22	2
Tokyo Verdy	Total		50	6	3	0	0	0	0	0	53	6
Machida Zelvia	2023	J2 League	16	1	–						16	1
Machida Zelvia	2024	J1 League	13	0	1	0	6	1	–		20	1
Machida Zelvia	2025	J1 League	0	0	1	0	1	0	–		2	0
Machida Zelvia	Total		29	1	2	0	7	1	0	0	38	2
Tochigi City FC (loan)	2025	J3 League	14	6	–		–		–		14	6
Career total			117	19	6	0	7	1	11	5	141	25

== Honours ==
Iwaki

- Japanese Regional Football Champions League : 2019
- Japan Football League : 2021

Machida Zelvia

- J2 League: 2023
