= Takaya Numata =

Japanese footballer

Personal information
- Date of birth: 19 April 1999 (age 27)
- Place of birth: Takatsuki, Osaka, Japan
- Height: 1.73 m (5 ft 8 in)
- Position: Forward

Team information
- Current team: Fujieda MYFC
- Number: 18

Youth career
- 2015–2017: Settsu High School

College career
Years	Team	Apps	(Gls)
2018–2021	Kansai University		

Senior career*
Years	Team	Apps	(Gls)
2022	Renofa Yamaguchi	41	(7)
2023–2026	FC Machida Zelvia	46	(3)
2024	→ Kagoshima United FC (loan)	10	(0)
2026–	Fujieda MYFC	0	(0)
- * Club domestic league appearances and goals as of 13 August 2026

Takaya Numata (沼田 駿也, Numata Takaya; born 19 April 1999) is a Japanese footballer currently playing as a forward for Fujieda MYFC.

== Career statistics ==
=== Club ===
As of 20 February 2022.

Club	Season	League			National Cup		League Cup		Other		Total	
Club	Season	Division	Apps	Goals	Apps	Goals	Apps	Goals	Apps	Goals	Apps	Goals
Renofa Yamaguchi	2022	J2 League	1	0	0	0	0	0	0	0	1	0
Career total			1	0	0	0	0	0	0	0	1	0
