= Kai Shibato =

Japanese footballer (born 1995)

Kai Shibato 柴戸 海
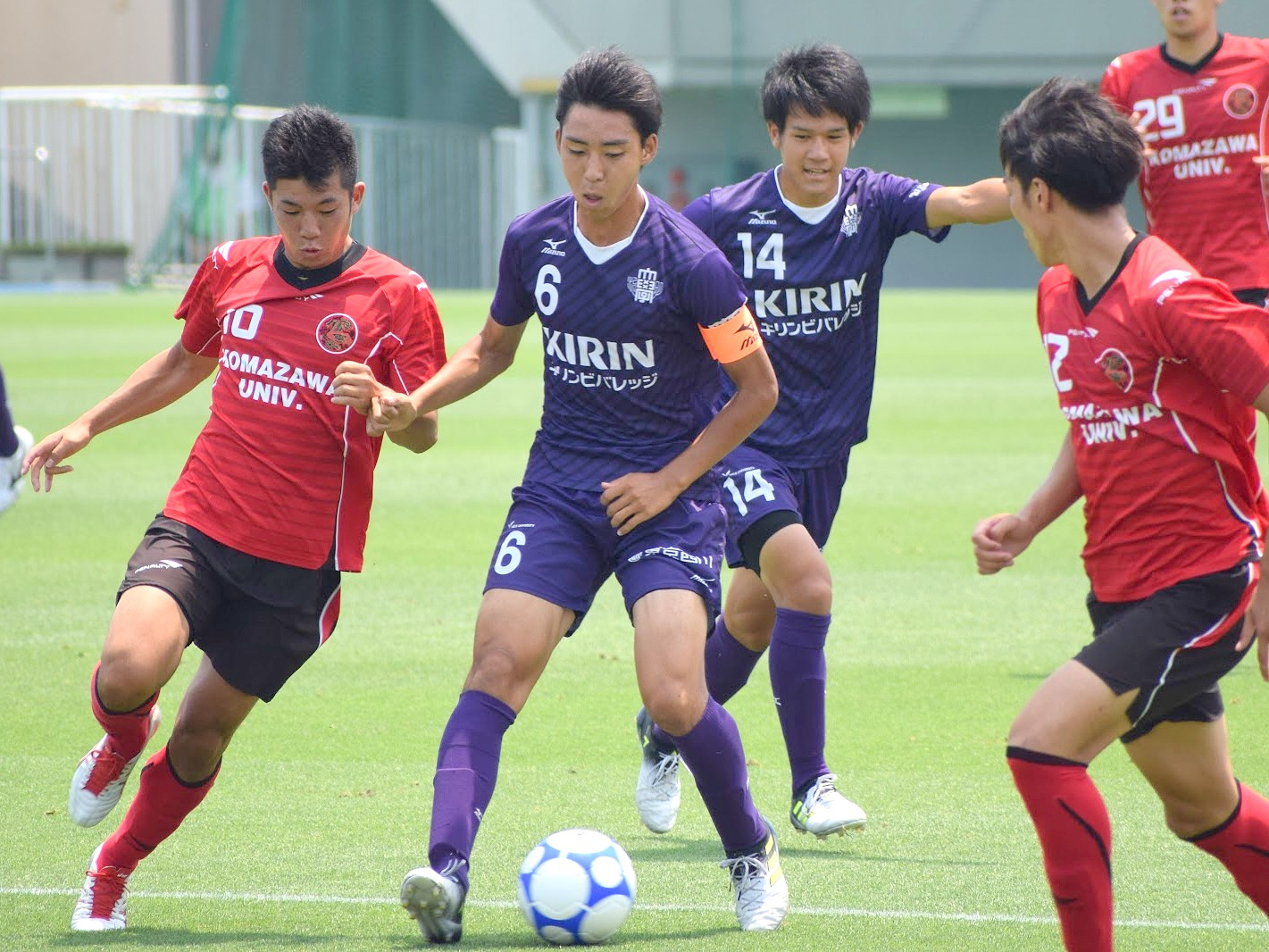

Personal information
- Full name: Kai Shibato
- Date of birth: 24 November 1995 (age 30)
- Place of birth: Kanagawa, Japan
- Height: 1.80 m (5 ft 11 in)
- Position: Defensive midfielder

Team information
- Current team: Tokyo Verdy
- Number: 2

Youth career
- 2011–2013: Ichiritsu Funabashi High School

College career
Years	Team	Apps	(Gls)
2014–2017	Meiji University		

Senior career*
Years	Team	Apps	(Gls)
2018–2026	Urawa Red Diamonds	139	(5)
2024	→ Machida Zelvia (loan)	22	(1)
2026–	Tokyo Verdy	0	(0)

International career
2017	Japan	2	(0)
Medal record
Urawa Reds
Winner	Emperor's Cup	2018
Runner-up	AFC Champions League	2019
Winner	Emperor's Cup	2021
Winner	AFC Champions League	2022
Winner	Japanese Super Cup	2022
- * Club domestic league appearances and goals as of 8 August 2026

Kai Shibato (柴戸 海, Shibato Kai; born 24 November 1995) is a Japanese professional footballer who plays as a defensive midfielder for J1 League club Tokyo Verdy. He has 2 caps for the Japan national football team.

== Career ==
After attending Meiji University and even getting picked for All Japan University XI, Shibato joined Urawa Red Diamonds in May 2017.

In January 2024, Shibato moved on loan to newly promoted J1 League club Machida Zelvia, ahead of the 2024 season.

== Career statistics ==
=== Club ===
As of 12 April 2024.

Appearances and goals by club, season and competition
Club	Season	League			National Cup		League Cup		Continental		Other		Total	
Club	Season	Division	Apps	Goals	Apps	Goals	Apps	Goals	Apps	Goals	Apps	Goals	Apps	Goals
Japan			League		Emperor's Cup		J.League Cup		AFC		Other		Total	
Urawa Red Diamonds	2018	J1 League	9	1	4	0	2	0	–		–		15	1
Urawa Red Diamonds	2019	J1 League	20	0	3	0	1	0	8	0	1 (Note: Appearances in the Japanese Super Cup)	0	33	0
Urawa Red Diamonds	2020	J1 League	25	1	0	0	2	0	–		–		27	1
Urawa Red Diamonds	2021	J1 League	30	1	5	0	8	0	–		–		43	1
Urawa Red Diamonds	2022	J1 League	24	2	0	0	2	0	6	0	1	0	33	2
Urawa Red Diamonds	2023	J1 League	8	0	2	0	8	0	5	0	1 (Note: Appearance in the FIFA Club World Cup)	0	24	0
Urawa Red Diamonds	Total		116	5	14	0	23	0	19	0	3	0	175	5
Machida Zelvia (loan)	2024	J1 League	7	0	0	0	0	0	–		–		7	0
Career total			123	5	14	0	23	0	19	0	3	0	182	5

=== International ===
As of match played 16 December 2017

Japan national team
Year	Apps	Goals
2017	2	0
Total	2	0

== Honours ==
=== Club ===
Urawa Red Diamonds

- Emperor's Cup: 2018, 2021
- AFC Champions League: 2022
- AFC Champions League runner-up: 2019
- Japanese Super Cup: 2022
