= Shōta Fujio =

Japanese footballer (born 2001)

Shōta Fujio 藤尾 翔太
Personal information
- Full name: Shōta Fujio
- Date of birth: 2 May 2001 (age 25)
- Place of birth: Osaka, Japan
- Height: 1.84 m (6 ft 0 in)
- Position: Forward

Team information
- Current team: Kashiwa Reysol
- Number: 15

Youth career
- –2016: Rip Ace SC
- 2017–2019: Cerezo Osaka

Senior career*
Years	Team	Apps	(Gls)
2018–2023	Cerezo Osaka	5	(1)
2018–2020	Cerezo Osaka U-23	42	(10)
2021	→ Mito HollyHock (loan)	22	(8)
2022	→ Tokushima Vortis (loan)	30	(10)
2023	→ Machida Zelvia (loan)	33	(8)
2024–2026	Machida Zelvia	85	(13)
2026–	Kashiwa Reysol	3	(0)

International career
2017	Japan U-16	1	(0)
2019	Japan U-18	5	(1)
2021−	Japan U-23	7	(2)
Medal record
Men's football
Representing Japan
AFC U-23 Asian Cup
Bronze medal – third place	2022 Uzbekistan	Team
Gold medal – first place	2024 Qatar	Team
- * Club domestic league appearances and goals as of 9 August 2026

Shōta Fujio (藤尾 翔太, Fujio Shōta; born May 2, 2001) is a Japanese professional footballer who plays as a forward for J1 League club Kashiwa Reysol.

== Career ==
Fujio scored a last minute goal against Urawa Red Diamonds on his senior team debut after coming on as a substitute in the 86' minute.

== International career ==
Fujio has international caps at youth level (U-16, U-18 and U-21), as well as U-23 for Japan. He scored 2 goals at the group stage match against Paraguay in the 2024 Summer Olympics.

On 4 April 2024, Fujio was called up to the Japan U23 squad for the 2024 AFC U-23 Asian Cup.

== Career statistics ==
As of 5 October 2026

Appearances and goals by club, season and competition
Club	Season	League			National cup (Note: Includes Emperor's Cup)		League cup (Note: Includes J.League Cup)		Continental		Total	
Club	Season	Division	Apps	Goals	Apps	Goals	Apps	Goals	Apps	Goals	Apps	Goals
Cerezo Osaka	2020	J1 League	4	1	0	0	0	0	–		4	1
Cerezo Osaka	2021	J1 League	1	0	0	0	0	0	–		1	0
Cerezo Osaka	Total		5	1	0	0	0	0	0	0	5	1
Cerezo Osaka U-23 (loan)	2018	J3 League	5	0	–		–		–		5	0
Cerezo Osaka U-23 (loan)	2019	J3 League	11	2	–		–		–		11	2
Cerezo Osaka U-23 (loan)	2020	J3 League	26	8	–		–		–		26	8
Cerezo Osaka U-23 (loan)	Total		42	10	0	0	0	0	0	0	42	10
Mito HollyHock (loan)	2021	J2 League	22	8	–		–		–		22	8
Tokushima Vortis (loan)	2022	J2 League	30	10	0	0	2	0	–		32	10
Machida Zelvia (loan)	2023	J2 League	33	8	2	0	0	0	0	0	35	8
Machida Zelvia	2024	J1 League	31	9	0	0	2	0	0	0	33	9
Machida Zelvia	2025	J1 League	35	3	6	5	2	1	12 (Note: Appearances in AFC Champions League Elite)	1	55	10
Machida Zelvia	2026	J1 (100)	17	1	–		–		0	0	17	1
Machida Zelvia	2026–27	J1 League	2	0	0	0	0	0	0	0	2	0
Machida Zelvia	Total		85	13	6	5	4	1	12	1	107	20
Kashiwa Reysol	2026–27	J1 League	3	0	0	0	1	2	0	0	4	2
Career total			220	50	8	5	7	3	12	1	247	59

== Honours ==
Machida Zelvia

- J2 League: 2023
- Emperor's Cup: 2025

Japan U-23

- AFC U-23 Asian Cup: 2024
