= Yoshiaki Arai =

Japanese footballer

Yoshiaki Arai 新井栄聡
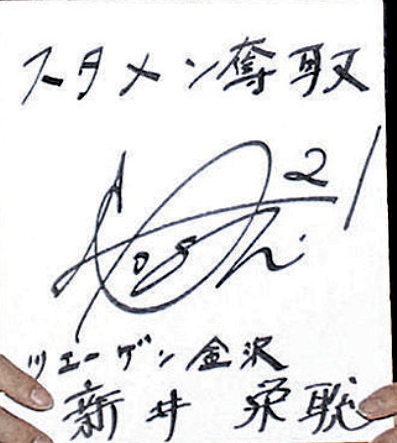

Personal information
- Full name: Yoshiaki Arai
- Date of birth: September 27, 1995 (age 31)
- Place of birth: Sakado, Saitama, Japan
- Height: 1.87 m (6 ft 1 1/2 in)
- Position: Goalkeeper

Team information
- Current team: Urawa Red Diamonds
- Number: 44

Youth career
- Kobe Kangaroo
- Kobe Diplomats
- 2011–2013: Seibudai High School

College career
Years	Team	Apps	(Gls)
2014–2017	Ryutsu Keizai University		

Senior career*
Years	Team	Apps	(Gls)
2015–2016	RKD Ryūgasaki	15	(0)
2018–2020	Shimizu S-Pulse	0	(0)
2019	→Zweigen Kanazawa (loan)	0	(0)
2021–2022	Blaublitz Akita	15	(0)
2023–2024	Oita Trinita	0	(0)
2024–2026	Machida Zelvia	0	(0)
2026–	Urawa Red Diamonds	0	(0)
- * Club domestic league appearances and goals as of 09:27, 7 October 2026 (UTC)

Yoshiaki Arai (新井栄聡, Arai Yoshiaki; born September 27, 1995) is a Japanese professional footballer who plays as a goalkeeper for J1 League club Urawa Red Diamonds.

== Career ==
After attending Ryutsu Keizai University, Arai joined Shimizu S-Pulse in January 2018.

== Career statistics ==
=== Club ===
As of 7 October 2026

Appearances and goals by club, season and competition
Club	Season	League			National cup (Note: Includes Emperor's Cup)		Total	
Club	Season	Division	Apps	Goals	Apps	Goals	Apps	Goals
RKD Ryūgasaki	2015	JFL	8	0	–		8	0
RKD Ryūgasaki	2016	JFL	7	0	–		7	0
RKD Ryūgasaki	Total		15	0	0	0	15	0
Shimizu S-Pulse	2018	J1 League	0	0	0	0	0	0
Shimizu S-Pulse	2020	J1 League	0	0	0	0	0	0
Shimizu S-Pulse	Total		0	0	0	0	0	0
Zweigen Kanazawa (loan)	2019	J2 League	0	0	0	0	0	0
Blaublitz Akita	2021	J2 League	5	0	1	0	6	0
Blaublitz Akita	2022	J2 League	10	0	1	0	11	0
Blaublitz Akita	Total		15	0	2	0	17	0
Oita Trinita	2023	J2 League	0	0	0	0	0	0
Oita Trinita	2024	J2 League	0	0	0	0	0	0
Oita Trinita	Total		0	0	0	0	0	0
Machida Zelvia	2024	J1 League	0	0	0	0	0	0
Machida Zelvia	2025	J1 League	0	0	0	0	0	0
Machida Zelvia	2026	J1 (100)	0	0	–		0	0
Machida Zelvia	Total		0	0	0	0	0	0
Urawa Red Diamonds	2026–27	J1 League	0	0	0	0	0	0
Career total			30	0	2	0	32	0

== Honours ==
=== Club ===
Machida Zelvia

- Emperor's Cup: 2025

=== Individual ===
- Best Goalkeeper Award (All Japan University Football Championship): 2017
