= Henry Heroki Mochizuki =

Japanese footballer

Henry Heroki Mochizuki 望月 ヘンリー 海輝
Personal information
- Full name: Henry Heroki Mochizuki
- Date of birth: 20 September 2001 (age 25)
- Place of birth: Fujimino, Japan
- Height: 1.92 m (6 ft 4 in)
- Position: Defender

Team information
- Current team: Machida Zelvia
- Number: 6

Youth career
- Kamifukuoka Thunders
- –2013: Omiya Ardija
- 2014–2019: Mitsubishi Yowa

College career
Years	Team	Apps	(Gls)
2020–2023	Kokushikan University		

Senior career*
Years	Team	Apps	(Gls)
2024–	Machida Zelvia	68	(2)

International career^{‡}
2025–	Japan	5	(1)
- * Club domestic league appearances and goals as of 9 August 2026 ‡ National team caps and goals as of 14 October 2025

Henry Heroki Mochizuki (望月 ヘンリー 海輝, Mochizuki Henrī Hiroki; born 20 September 2001) is a Japanese professional footballer who plays as a defender for J.League club Machida Zelvia and the Japan national team.

== Early life ==
Mochizuki was born in 2001 and has a Nigerian father and a Japanese mother. He began playing football at a young age under the influence of his father, who was a football fan and particularly admired Ronaldinho. As a child, Mochizuki often played football with his father rather than simply watching matches on television.

He joined the youth system of Omiya Ardija during elementary school and primarily played on the flank, including as a wing-back and full-back. Although he already possessed good physical ability, he did not initially stand out technically and was not promoted to Omiya's junior-youth team. He subsequently joined Mitsubishi Yowa Sports Club, where he continued his development through junior-high and high school football.

Mochizuki has described his time at Kokushikan University as a turning point in his career. Seeing talented older players struggle to secure professional contracts made him realise that natural ability alone would not be enough. He began taking individual training and strength training much more seriously and became more conscious of what he needed to do to become a professional footballer.

== Club career ==
On 10 May 2023, it was announced that Mochizuki would join Machida Zelvia from the 2024 season.

== Playing style ==
Mochizuki is a physically imposing right-back and right wing-back, standing at 1.92 metres (6 ft 4 in). Despite his unusual height for a full-back, he possesses considerable pace and acceleration, allowing him to make repeated forward runs and recover quickly when defending. His long reach and physical strength also make him effective in one-on-one situations and aerial duels.

Mochizuki's playing style is characterised by his ability to combine the physical qualities of a much taller defender with the mobility of a modern wide defender. In possession, he is capable of carrying the ball forward at speed and making overlapping runs down the right flank. He has also been used higher up the pitch as a right wing-back, where his pace allows him to attack space behind the opposition defence. Defensively, his speed enables him to cover large areas, while his height and reach give him an advantage when challenging opponents for the ball.

== International career ==
Born in Japan, Mochizuki is of Nigerian descent through his father. He was called up to the senior Japan national team for a set of 2026 FIFA World Cup qualification matches in September 2024.

== International goals ==
No.	Date	Venue	Opponent	Score	Result	Competition
1	12 July 2025	Yongin Mireu Stadium, Yongin, South Korea	China	2–0	2–0	2025 EAFF E-1 Football Championship

== Honours ==
Machida Zelvia

- Emperor's Cup: 2025

Japan

- EAFF Championship: 2025
