= Hokuto Shimoda =

Japanese footballer (born 1991)

Hokuto Shimoda 下田 北斗
Personal information
- Full name: Hokuto Shimoda
- Date of birth: 7 November 1991 (age 34)
- Place of birth: Hiratsuka, Kanagawa, Japan
- Height: 1.71 m (5 ft 7 in)
- Position: Midfielder

Team information
- Current team: FC Machida Zelvia
- Number: 18

Youth career
- 2004–2006: Koyo Junior High School
- 2007–2009: Oshimizu High School

College career
Years	Team	Apps	(Gls)
2010–2013	Senshu University		

Senior career*
Years	Team	Apps	(Gls)
2014–2015	Ventforet Kofu	39	(0)
2016–2017	Shonan Bellmare	43	(2)
2018–2020	Kawasaki Frontale	34	(1)
2021–2022	Oita Trinita	67	(4)
2023–	FC Machida Zelvia	108	(13)
Medal record
Kawasaki Frontale
Winner	J1 League	2018
Winner	J1 League	2020
- * Club domestic league appearances and goals as of 9 August 2026

Hokuto Shimoda (下田 北斗, Shimoda Hokuto; 7 November 1991) is a Japanese footballer who plays for FC Machida Zelvia.

== Career ==
Shimoda play a great part in Senshu University's success in football, as he was named MVP of Kanto University Football Association in 2013, just before joining Ventforet Kofu for the incoming season of 2014.

After two season in Yamanashi Prefecture, he signed for Shonan Bellmare for 2016, coming back to his home town.

== Club statistics ==
As of match played 8 December 2024.

Appearances and goals by club, season and competition
Club	Season	League			Cup		League Cup		Continental		Other		Total	
Club	Season	Division	Apps	Goals	Apps	Goals	Apps	Goals	Apps	Goals	Apps	Goals	Apps	Goals
Japan			League		Emperor's Cup		League Cup		AFC		Other		Total	
Ventforet Kofu	2014	J1 League	11	0	2	0	4	0	—		—		17	0
Ventforet Kofu	2015	J1 League	22	2	3	0	5	0	—		—		30	2
Ventforet Kofu	Total		33	2	5	0	9	0	—		—		47	2
Shonan Bellmare	2016	J1 League	23	2	1	3	4	0	—		—		28	5
Shonan Bellmare	2017	J2 League	10	0	2	0	—		—		—		12	0
Shonan Bellmare	Total		33	2	3	3	4	0	—		—		40	5
Kawasaki Frontale	2018	J1 League	5	1	2	0	0	0	1	0	—		8	1
Kawasaki Frontale	2019	J1 League	15	0	3	0	4	1	0	0	0	0	22	1
Kawasaki Frontale	2020	J1 League	14	0	—		2	0	—		—		16	0
Kawasaki Frontale	Total		34	1	5	0	6	1	1	0	0	0	46	2
Oita Trinita	2021	J1 League	32	1	3	0	3	0	—		—		38	1
Oita Trinita	2022	J2 League	35	3	1	0	0	0	—		0	0	36	3
Oita Trinita	Total		67	4	4	0	3	0	—		0	0	74	4
Machida Zelvia	2023	J2 League	31	5	1	0	—		—		—		32	5
Machida Zelvia	2024	J1 League	30	5	0	0	6	2	—		—		36	7
Machida Zelvia	Total		61	10	1	0	6	2	—		—		68	12
Career total			228	19	18	3	28	3	1	0	0	0	275	25

== Honours ==
Kawasaki Frontale

- J1 League: 2018, 2020
- J.League Cup: 2019
- Emperor's Cup: 2020

Machida Zelvia

- J2 League: 2023
- Emperor's Cup: 2025
