= Na Sang-ho =

South Korean footballer (born 1996)

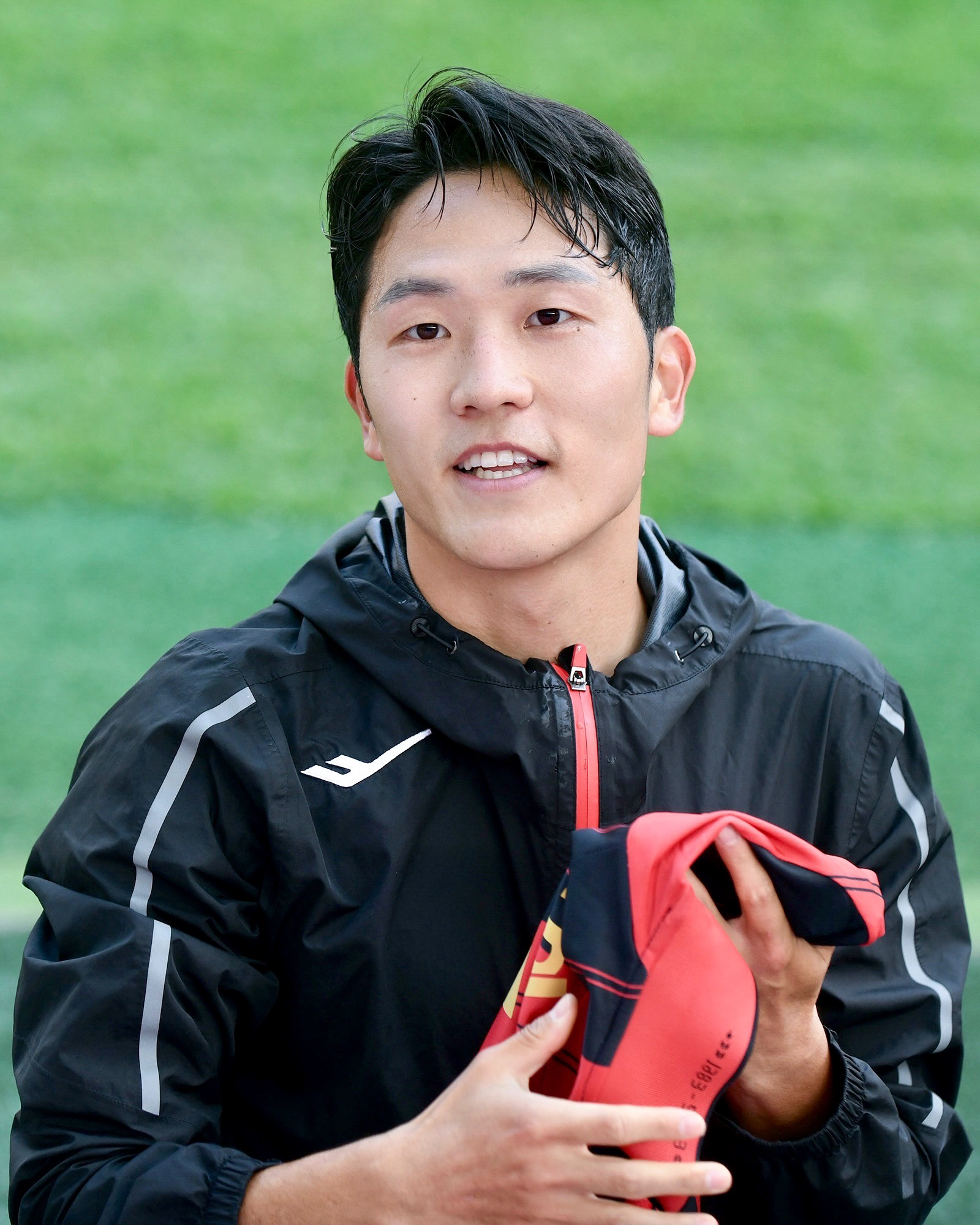
- Na in 2023

Personal information
- Date of birth: 12 August 1996 (age 30)
- Place of birth: Damyang, Jeonnam, South Korea
- Height: 1.73 m (5 ft 8 in)
- Position: Winger

Team information
- Current team: Fagiano Okayama
- Number: 10

Youth career
- 2012–2014: Gwangju FC (Note: Played for Kumho High School, which was an academy of Gwangju FC.)

College career
Years	Team	Apps	(Gls)
2015–2016	Dankook University		

Senior career*
Years	Team	Apps	(Gls)
2017–2018	Gwangju FC	49	(18)
2019–2020	FC Tokyo	25	(2)
2019	FC Tokyo U-23	1	(0)
2020	→ Seongnam FC (loan)	19	(7)
2021–2023	FC Seoul	104	(29)
2024–2026	Machida Zelvia	57	(9)
2026–	Fagiano Okayama	1	(0)

International career^{‡}
2014	South Korea U20	3 (Note: Includes one appearance against regional team.)	(0)
2018	South Korea U23	6	(1)
2018–	South Korea	30	(2)
Medal record
Men's football
Representing South Korea
Asian Games
Gold medal – first place	2018 Jakarta-Palembang
EAFF Championship
Winner	2019 South Korea
Runner-up	2022 Japan
Runner-up	2025 South Korea
- * Club domestic league appearances and goals as of 12 August 2026 ‡ National team caps and goals as of 15 July 2025

- Na Sang-ho
- Hangul: 나상호
- Hanja: 羅相浩
- RR: Na Sangho
- MR: Na Sangho

Na Sang-ho (Korean: 나상호; born 12 August 1996) is a South Korean professional footballer who plays as a winger for J1 League club Fagiano Okayama and the South Korea national team.

== Club career ==
In 2015, Na graduated from Kumho High School, which had a youth football club of K League club Gwangju FC, and then entered Dankook University's football team. After playing for Dankook University for two years, in 2017, Na returned to Gwangju FC, joining their senior team. He experienced relegation in his first professional season, but became the Most Valuable Player and the top goalscorer at the K League 2 the next year.

Prior to the 2019 season, he joined J1 League club FC Tokyo. In the first half of the season, he played as a substitute, playing for 339 minutes in 13 matches. He was expected to become one of main players after teammate Takefusa Kubo left for Spain in June, but his status at Tokyo was not improved until the end of the season.

On 8 June 2020, he was loaned to K League 1 club Seongnam FC. He joined Seongnam in the middle of the season, but became the club's top scorer. He performed a key role in avoiding Seongnam's relegation.

Since 2021, Na joined another K League 1 club FC Seoul, playing as a main winger for them. He captained the club since the second half of the 2022 season, and received the K League Player of the Month award twice during the 2023 season. However, he failed to lead his team to the top six at the league for three years, and had to face Seoul fans' criticisms along with his teammates.

On 4 January 2024, Na joined newly-promoted J1 League club Machida Zelvia on a permanent deal. On 22 November 2025, he came on as a 65th-minute substitute in the 2025 Emperor's Cup final against Vissel Kobe, and defended the club's 3–1 lead until the end of the match.

== International career ==
Na won a gold medal with the South Korea under-23 national team at the 2018 Asian Games.

After becoming a gold medalist at the Asian Games, Na started to be used at the senior national team under manager Paulo Bento. He scored his first senior international goal in a World Cup qualifier against Turkmenistan on 10 September 2019, and won the 2019 EAFF E-1 Football Championship. He could not participate at the 2019 AFC Asian Cup due to an injury, but left good impressions at the national team in 2019.

However, Na underperformed in matches prior to the 2022 FIFA World Cup, bringing Korean fans anxieties. Bento called him up for the tournament, trusting him continuously despite the criticisms. He showed energetic movements against Uruguay and Ghana, getting a good press at the tournament.

== Career statistics ==
=== Club ===
As of match played 6 June 2026

Appearances and goals by club, season and competition
Club	Season	League			National cup		League cup		Continental		Other		Total	
Club	Season	Division	Apps	Goals	Apps	Goals	Apps	Goals	Apps	Goals	Apps	Goals	Apps	Goals
Gwangju FC	2017	K League 1	18	2	3	0	—		—		—		21	2
Gwangju FC	2018	K League 2	31	16	0	0	—		—		—		31	16
Gwangju FC	Total		49	18	3	0	—		—		—		52	18
FC Tokyo	2019	J1 League	25	2	1	0	7	1	—		—		33	3
FC Tokyo U-23	2019	J3 League	1	0	—		—		—		—		1	0
Seongnam FC (loan)	2020	K League 1	19	7	3	0	—		—		—		22	7
FC Seoul	2021	K League 1	34	9	1	0	—		—		—		35	9
FC Seoul	2022	K League 1	32	8	4	1	—		—		—		36	9
FC Seoul	2023	K League 1	38	12	0	0	—		—		—		38	12
FC Seoul	Total		104	29	5	1	—		—		—		109	30
Machida Zelvia	2024	J1 League	24	3	1	0	5	2	—		—		30	5
Machida Zelvia	2025	J1 League	33	6	5	0	0	0	5 (Note: Appearances in AFC Champions League Elite)	0	—		43	6
Machida Zelvia	2026–27	J1 League	—		—		—		6	0	18 (Note: Appearances in J1 100 Year Vision League)	3	24	3
Machida Zelvia	Total		57	9	6	0	5	2	11	0	18	3	97	14
Fagiano Okayama	2026–27	J1 League	0	0	0	0	0	0	—		—		0	0
Career total			255	65	18	1	12	3	11	0	18	3	314	72

=== International ===
As of match played 15 July 2025

Appearances and goals by national team and year
National team	Year	Apps	Goals
South Korea	2018	2	0
South Korea	2019	11	2
South Korea	2021	3	0
South Korea	2022	10	0
South Korea	2023	2	0
South Korea	2025	2	0
Total		30	2

Scores and results list South Korea's goal tally first, score column indicates score after each Na goal.

List of international goals scored by Na Sang-ho
No.	Date	Venue	Opponent	Score	Result	Competition
1	10 September 2019	Köpetdag Stadium, Ashgabat, Turkmenistan	Turkmenistan	1–0	2–0	2022 FIFA World Cup qualification
2	11 December 2019	Busan Asiad Main Stadium, Busan, South Korea	Hong Kong	2–0	2–0	2019 EAFF Championship

== Honours ==
Machida Zelvia

- Emperor's Cup: 2025
- AFC Champions League Elite runner-up: 2025–26

South Korea U23

- Asian Games: 2018

South Korea

- EAFF Championship: 2019

Individual

- K League 2 Most Valuable Player: 2018
- K League 2 top goalscorer: 2018
- K League 2 Best XI: 2018
- K League Player of the Month: April 2023, July 2023
- K League Goal of the Month: April 2023
