= 2026–27 FC Machida Zelvia season =

Machida Zelvia
2025 season
- Manager: Go Kuroda
- Stadium: Machida GION Stadium
Home colours	Away colours
- All statistics correct as of 14 June 2026.

The 2026–27 FC Machida Zelvia season is the club's 39th season in history. They will also play in the 2026–27 AFC Champions League Two after winning the 2025 Emperor Cup.

== Squad ==
=== Season squad ===
Squad no.	Name	Nationality	Date of birth	Previous Team
Goalkeepers
1	Kosei Tani	(Japan)	22 November 2000 (age 25)	(Belgium) Dender
13	Tatsuya Morita	(Japan)	3 August 1990 (age 36)	(Japan) Kashiwa Reysol
66	Aki Koch	(Japan) (Germany)	18 March 2004 (age 22)	(Germany) Karlsruher SC
89	Nicholas Guimarães	(Philippines) (Japan)	9 August 2006 (age 20)	(Japan) Ichikawa Soccer Club
Defenders
2	Thomas Ouwejan	(Netherlands)	30 September 1996 (age 30)	(Netherlands) NEC Nijmegen
3	Gen Shoji (c)	(Japan)	11 December 1992 (age 33)	(Japan) Kashima Antlers
5	Ibrahim Drešević	(Kosovo) (Sweden)	24 January 1997 (age 29)	(Turkey) Fatih Karagümrük
6	Henry Hiroki Mochizuki	(Japan) (Nigeria)	20 September 2001 (age 25)	(Japan) Kokushikan University
24	Kim Min-tae	(South Korea)	26 November 1993 (age 32)	(Japan) Shimizu S-Pulse
33	Takahiro Akimoto	(Japan)	31 January 1998 (age 28)	(Belgium) OH Leuven
50	Daihachi Okamura	(Japan)	15 February 1997 (age 29)	(Japan) Hokkaido Consadole Sapporo
88	Hotaka Nakamura	(Japan)	12 August 1997 (age 29)	(Japan) FC Tokyo
	Futo Nishikawa	(Japan)	28 April 2004 (age 22)	(Japan) Ryutsu Keizai University
Midfielders
4	Ryuho Kikuchi	(Japan)	9 December 1996 (age 29)	(Japan) Vissel Kobe
8	Keiya Sento	(Japan)	29 December 1994 (age 31)	(Japan) Kashiwa Reysol
16	Hiroyuki Mae	(Japan)	1 August 1995 (age 31)	(Japan) Avispa Fukuoka
18	Hokuto Shimoda	(Japan)	7 November 1991 (age 35)	(Japan) Oita Trinita
23	Ryōhei Shirasaki	(Japan)	18 May 1993 (age 33)	(Japan) Shimizu S-Pulse
28	Cha Je-hoon	(South Korea)	3 May 2006 (age 20)	(South Korea) Jungkyung High School
31	Neta Lavi	(Israel) (Portugal)	25 August 1996 (age 30)	(Japan) Gamba Osaka
34	Futa Tokumura	(Japan)	26 November 2007 (age 18)	(Japan) Kamigaku High School
37	Kosei Ashibe	(Japan)	5 April 2001 (age 25)	(Japan) Fukushima United
79	Kessman Egbus Mikuni	(Japan) (Nigeria)	28 September 2008 (age 18)	Youth Team
Forwards
7	Yuki Soma	(Japan)	25 February 1997 (age 29)	(Portugal) Casa Pia
9	Kōki Ogawa	(Japan)	8 August 1997 (age 29)	(Netherlands) NEC Nijmegen
14	Yūsuke Matsuo	(Japan)	23 July 1997 (age 29)	(Belgium) KVC Westerlo
15	Mitchell Duke	(Australia)	18 January 1991 (age 35)	(Australia) Macarthur FC
20	Takuma Nishimura	(Japan)	22 October 1996 (age 30)	(Japan) Yokohama F. Marinos
99	Tete Yengi	(Australia) (South Sudan) (England)	28 November 2000 (age 25)	(Scotland) Livingston
Players loaned out
11	Asahi Masuyama	(Japan)	29 January 1997 (age 29)	(Japan) V-Varen Nagasaki
17	Kaung Zan Mara	(Japan) (Myanmar)	11 June 2002 (age 24)	(Japan) Sanno University
39	Byron Vásquez	(Chile) (Japan)	16 May 2000 (age 26)	(Japan) Tochigi City
49	Kanji Kuwayama	(Japan)	28 November 2002 (age 23)	(Japan) Tokai University
55	Anton Burns	(Japan) (United States)	1 October 2003 (age 23)	(Japan) Gainare Tottori
60	Mayaka Chui Hiromu (M)	(Japan) (Nigeria)	11 August 2006 (age 20)	Youth Team
77	Takumi Narasaka	(Japan)	6 July 2002 (age 24)	(Japan) Giravanz Kitakyushu
Players left during season
9	Shōta Fujio	(Japan)	2 May 2001 (age 25)	(Japan) Cerezo Osaka
19	Yūta Nakayama	(Japan)	16 February 1997 (age 29)	(England) Huddersfield Town
27	Erik	(Brazil)	18 July 1994 (age 32)	(Japan) Vissel Kobe
38	Tenshiro Takasaki	(Japan)	13 February 2006 (age 20)	(Japan) Quon Football Academy

Last updated: 19 August 2024.
Source: FC Machida Zelvia website

== Transfers ==
=== In ===
Pre-season

Date	Position	Player	Transferred from	Ref
Permanent Transfer
31 May 2026	DF	(Japan) Takumi Narasaka	(Japan) Giravanz Kitakyushu	End of loan
31 May 2026	MF	(Japan) Kosei Ashibe	(Japan) Fukushima United	End of loan
31 May 2026	FW	(South Korea) Oh Se-hun	(Japan) Shimizu S-Pulse	End of loan
7 June 2026	GK	(Japan) (Germany) Aki Koch	(Germany) Karlsruhe SC	Free
2 July 2026	GK	(Philippines) (Japan) Nicholas Guimarães	(Japan) Ichikawa Soccer Club	Free
3 July 2026	FW	(Japan) Yūsuke Matsuo	(Japan) Urawa Red Diamonds	Undisclosed
3 July 2026	FW	(Australia) Mitchell Duke	(Australia) Macarthur FC	Free
9 July 2026	DF	(Japan) Takahiro Akimoto	(Belgium) OH Leuven	Undisclosed
14 July 2026	FW	(Australia) (South Sudan) (England) Tete Yengi	(Scotland) Livingston	Undisclosed
17 July 2026	DF	(Japan) Futo Nishikawa	(Japan) Ryutsu Keizai University	Free
24 August 2026	FW	(Japan) Kōki Ogawa	(Netherlands) NEC Nijmegen	Undisclosed
1 September 2026	DF	(Netherlands) Thomas Ouwejan	(Netherlands) NEC Nijmegen	Free
Loan Transfer

=== Out ===
Pre-season

Date	Position	Player	Transferred from	Ref
Permanent Transfer
31 May 2026	FW	(Australia) (South Sudan) (England) Tete Yengi	(Scotland) Livingston	End of loan
17 June 2026	FW	(Japan) Takaya Numata	(Japan) Fujieda MYFC	Free
23 June 2026	GK	(Japan) Yoshiaki Arai	(Japan) Urawa Red Diamonds	Free
27 June 2026	FW	(South Korea) Oh Se-hun	(Japan) Shimizu S-Pulse	Free
1 July 2026	DF	(Japan) Kotaro Hayashi	(Japan) Urawa Red Diamonds	Free
3 July 2026	DF	(Japan) Tomoki Imai	(Japan)	Free
3 July 2026	FW	(South Korea) Na Sang-ho	(Japan) Fagiano Okayama	Free
25 August 2026	FW	(Japan) Shōta Fujio	(Japan) Kashiwa Reysol	Undisclosed
28 August 2026	DF	(Japan) Yuta Nakayama	(Serbia) Red Star Belgrade	€1.1 million
9 September 2026	FW	(Brazil) Erik	(Japan) Vissel Kobe	Undisclosed
Loan Transfer
5 January 2026	GK	(Japan) (United States) Anton Burns	(Japan) Gainare Tottori	Season loan till Jan-27
17 June 2026	MF	(Japan) (Nigeria) Mayaka Chui Hiromu	(Japan) Shibuya City FC	Season loan
20 June 2026	MF	(Chile) (Japan) Byron Vásquez	(Japan) Tochigi City FC	Season loan
25 June 2026	FW	(Japan) Kanji Kuwayama	(Japan) Albirex Niigata	Season loan
27 June 2026	DF	(Japan) Takumi Narasaka	(Japan) Giravanz Kitakyushu	Season loan
28 June 2026	GK	(Japan) (Myanmar) Kaung Zan Mara	(Japan) Vanraure Hachinohe	Season loan
12 September 2026	MF	(Japan) Tenshiro Takasaki	(Brazil) Grêmio U20	Season loan
16 September 2026	MF	(Japan) Asahi Masuyama	(Japan) V-Varen Nagasaki	Season loan

== Pre-season and friendlies ==
=== Tour of Aomori (5 - 11 July) ===
11 July 1	Machida Zelvia	1–2	Vanraure Hachinohe	Aomori
		Report		Stadium: Kakuhilo Group Athletic Stadium

=== Tour of Okinawa (14 - 24 July) ===
18 July 2	Machida Zelvia	2–0	Thespa Gunma	Okinawa
		Report		Stadium: Gushikami Soccer Field

18 July 3	Machida Zelvia	3–1	Fujieda MYFC	Okinawa
		Report		Stadium: Gushikami Soccer Field

== Competitions ==
=== J1 League ===
==== Matches ====
The matches were unveiled on 13 June.

Pos	Team	Pld	W	D	L	GF	GA	GD	Pts	Qualification or relegation
2	Kashiwa Reysol	14	10	1	3	31	20	+11	31	Qualification for the AFC Champions League Elite league stage
3	Sanfrecce Hiroshima	14	9	3	2	32	10	+22	30	Qualification for the AFC Champions League Elite league stage
4	Machida Zelvia	14	8	5	1	30	10	+20	29	Qualification for the AFC Champions League Elite playoff round
5	Vissel Kobe	14	8	3	3	23	14	+9	27	
6	Kashima Antlers	14	7	2	5	29	24	+5	23	

Updated to match(es) played on 8 November 2026. Source: JLeague.jp,
Rules for classification: 1) Points; 2) Goal difference; 3) Goals scored; 4) Head-to-head points; 5) Head-to-head goal difference; 6) Head-to-head goals scored; 7) Fewer disciplinary points.

8 August 1	FC Tokyo	1–5	Machida Zelvia	Chōfu
	Marcelo Ryan 5'; Kento Hashimoto (red card) 38'; Kein Sato (yellow card) 88'	Report	Mitchell Duke 27'; Takahiro Akimoto 45+2'; Yuki Soma 51'; Tete Yengi 65'; Daihachi Okamura 80' (yellow card) 5'	Stadium: Ajinomoto Stadium; Attendance: 36,336; Referee: Hayato Shimizu

15 August 2	JEF United Chiba	0–4	Machida Zelvia	Chiba
	Takumi Tsukui (yellow card) 45+4'; Dan Hall (yellow card) 56'; Erison (yellow card) 89'	Report	Yūta Nakayama 17'; Tete Yengi 34'; Takuma Nishimura 70'; Hotaka Nakamura 82'	Stadium: Fukuda Denshi Arena; Attendance: 16,884; Referee: Koei Koya

23 August 3	Machida Zelvia	3–1	Urawa Red Diamonds	Tokyo
	Hotaka Nakamura 8'; Takuma Nishimura 54'; Neta Lavi 61'	Report	Ryoma Watanabe 45'; Yoichi Naganuma (yellow card) 83'	Stadium: MUFG Stadium; Attendance: 47,781; Referee: Hiroki Kasahara

29 August 4	Mito HollyHock	1–1	Machida Zelvia	Mito
	Arata Watanabe 27'	Report	Yuki Soma 33'; Kōki Ogawa (yellow card) 90+5'	Stadium: K's denki Stadium Mito; Attendance: 6,746; Referee: Yusuke Ohashi

2 September 5	Machida Zelvia	2–1	Kawasaki Frontale	Tokyo
	Kōki Ogawa 75', 81'	Report	Yasuto Wakizaka 59'	Stadium: Machida GION Stadium; Attendance: 9,021; Referee: Fu Ming (China)

6 September 6	Nagoya Grampus	1–3	Machida Zelvia	Toyota
	Henry Heroki Mochizuki 55' (o.g.); Ryuji Izumi (yellow card) 43'; Tomoki Takamine (yellow card) 83'	Report	Ryohei Shirasaki 45+7'; Takahiro Akimoto 74' (yellow card) 46'; Yusuke Matsuo 90+7'	Stadium: Toyota Stadium; Attendance: 27,049; Referee: Atsushi Kamimura

12 September 7	Machida Zelvia	1–1	Yokohama F. Marinos	Tokyo
	Henry Mochizuki 84'; Hotaka Nakamura (yellow card) 20'; Ryohei Shirasaki (yellow card) 45+4'; Takahiro Akimoto (yellow card) 72' (yellow-red card)	Report	Kaina Tanimura 12'; Tomoki Kondo (yellow card) 67'	Stadium: Machida GION Stadium; Attendance: 48,623; Referee: Koji Takasaki

20 September 8	Machida Zelvia	2–4	Kashiwa Reysol	Tokyo
	Yuki Soma 38'; Kōki Ogawa 90+1'; Hokuto Shimoda (red card) 62'	Report	Yusuke Segawa 53', 88'; Keita Endō 58'; Yoshio Koizumi 65'; Koki Kumasaka (yellow card) 76'; Seiya Baba (yellow card) 85'; Riki Harakawa (yellow card) 90'	Stadium: Machida GION Stadium; Attendance: 12,703; Referee: Takafumi Mikuriya

10 October 9	Kyoto Sanga	0–1	Machida Zelvia	Kyoto
	Everton Maceió (yellow card) 70'	Report	Takahiro Akimoto 86'; Tete Yengi (yellow card) 24'	Stadium: Sanga Stadium by Kyocera; Attendance: 16,287; Referee: Koki Nagamine

18 October 10 (Rescheduled)	Machida Zelvia	3–0	Avispa Fukuoka	Tokyo
	Tete Yengi 22'; Hiroyuki Mae 73'; Henry Mochizuki 76'; Daihachi Okamura (yellow card) 54'; Gen Shoji (yellow card) 60'	Report		Stadium: Machida GION Stadium; Attendance: 10,336; Referee: Jumpei Iida

21 October 11	Shimizu S-Pulse	0–5	Machida Zelvia	Shizuoka
	Yuki Honda (yellow card) 17'; Kai Matsuzaki (yellow card) 32' (yellow-red card)	Report	Neta Lavi 36'; Koki Ogawa 50'; Takuma Nishimura 60', 77', 82'	Stadium: IAI Stadium Nihondaira; Attendance: 10,750; Referee: Yuzo Sutani

24 October 12	Vissel Kobe	0–0	Machida Zelvia	Kobe
	Diego (yellow card) 90'	Report	Takuma Nishimura (yellow card) 16'; Hiroyuki Mae (yellow card) 71'	Stadium: Noevir Stadium Kobe; Attendance: 22,238; Referee: Akihiko Ikeuchi

1 November 13 (Rescheduled)	Machida Zelvia	0–0	Gamba Osaka	Tokyo
	Kim Min-Tae (yellow card) 83'	Report	Takeru Kishimoto (yellow card) 11'	Stadium: Machida GION Stadium; Attendance: 10,044; Referee: Ryo Tanimoto

8 November 14	Machida Zelvia	0–0	Sanfrecce Hiroshima	Tokyo
	Thomas Ouwejan (yellow card) 45+6'	Report	Yotaro Nakajima (yellow card) 45+5'	Stadium: Machida GION Stadium; Attendance: 12,388; Referee: Masuya Ueda

21 November 15	Machida Zelvia	0–0	V-Varen Nagasaki	Tokyo
		Report	Norman Campbell (yellow card) 27'; Kanta Doi (yellow card) 53'; Matheus Jesus (yellow card) 90+1'	Stadium: Machida GION Stadium; Attendance: 10,574; Referee: Atsushi Kamimura

16 December 16 (Rescheduled)	Kashima Antlers	–	Machida Zelvia	Tokyo
		Report		Stadium: Japan National Stadium

28 November 17	Machida Zelvia	–	Tokyo Verdy	Tokyo
		Report		Stadium: Machida GION Stadium

6 December 18	Machida Zelvia	–	Fagiano Okayama	Tokyo
		Report		Stadium: Machida GION Stadium

12 December 19	Cerezo Osaka	–	Machida Zelvia	Osaka
		Report		Stadium: Yodoko Sakura Stadium

19 December 20	Gamba Osaka	–	Machida Zelvia	Osaka
		Report		Stadium: Suita City Football Stadium

13 February 21	Machida Zelvia	–	JEF United Chiba	Tokyo
		Report		Stadium: Machida GION Stadium

20 February 22	Yokohama F. Marinos	–	Machida Zelvia	Yokohama
		Report		Stadium: Nissan Stadium

27 February 23	Kawasaki Frontale	–	Machida Zelvia	Tokyo
		Report		Stadium: Japan National Stadium

6 March 24	Machida Zelvia	–	Shimizu S-Pulse	Tokyo
		Report		Stadium: Machida GION Stadium

10 March 25	Machida Zelvia	–	Kashima Antlers	Tokyo
		Report		Stadium: Machida GION Stadium

13 March 26	Machida Zelvia	–	Nagoya Grampus	Tokyo
		Report		Stadium: Machida GION Stadium

20 March 27	Machida Zelvia	–	Mito HollyHock	Tokyo
		Report		Stadium: Machida GION Stadium

3 April 28	Tokyo Verdy	–	Machida Zelvia	Chōfu
		Report		Stadium: Ajinomoto Stadium

10 April 29	Machida Zelvia	–	Vissel Kobe	Tokyo
		Report		Stadium: Machida GION Stadium

17 April 30	Avispa Fukuoka	–	Machida Zelvia	Fukuoka
		Report		Stadium: Best Denki Stadium

24 April 31	Sanfrecce Hiroshima	–	Machida Zelvia	Hiroshima
		Report		Stadium: Edion Peace Wing Hiroshima

29 April 32	Urawa Red Diamonds	–	Machida Zelvia	Saitama
		Report		Stadium: Saitama Stadium 2002

3 May 33	Machida Zelvia	–	Kyoto Sanga	Tokyo
		Report		Stadium: Machida GION Stadium

9 May 34	Kashiwa Reysol	–	Machida Zelvia	Chiba
		Report		Stadium: Sankyo Frontier Kashiwa Stadium

15 May 35	Machida Zelvia	–	FC Tokyo	Tokyo
		Report		Stadium: Machida GION Stadium

22 May 36	Fagiano Okayama	–	Machida Zelvia	Okayama
		Report		Stadium: City Light Stadium

29 May 37	V-Varen Nagasaki	–	Machida Zelvia	Nagasaki
		Report		Stadium: Peace Stadium Connected by SoftBank

6 June 38	Machida Zelvia	–	Cerezo Osaka	Tokyo
		Report		Stadium: Machida GION Stadium

=== Emperor's Cup ===
26 August Rd 2	Machida Zelvia	3–0	Iwate Grulla Morioka	Tokyo
	Yūsuke Matsuo 37'; Tete Yengi 69'; Hotaka Nakamura 84'		Yoo Se-geun (red card) 80'	Stadium: Machida GION Stadium; Attendance: 2,515; Referee: Yusuke Araki

23 September Rd 3	Machida Zelvia	2–1	Tochigi City	Tokyo
	Mitch Duke 22'; Kōki Ogawa 70' (yellow card) 90'	Report	Yuta Koike 69'; Joe Kato (yellow card) 25'	Stadium: Machida GION Stadium; Attendance: 3,003; Referee: Masuya Ueda

9 December Rd of 16	Machida Zelvia	–	Tokyo Verdy	Tokyo
				Stadium: Machida GION Stadium

=== J.League Cup ===
3 October Rd 4	Machida Zelvia	0–0 (a.e.t.) (5–3 p)	Kyoto Sanga	Tokyo
	Gen Shoji (yellow card) 39'	Report	Yoshinori Suzuki (yellow card) 59'; Rafael Elias (yellow card) 65'	Stadium: Machida GION Stadium; Attendance: 4,437; Referee: Futoshi Nakamura
	Penalties
	Ibrahim Drešević (penalty scored); Hokuto Shimoda (penalty scored); Kosei Tani (penalty scored); Thomas Ouwejan (penalty scored); Ryōhei Shirasaki (penalty scored)		Marco Túlio (penalty scored); Yoon Sung-jun (penalty missed); Haruki Arai (penalty scored); Kyo Sato (penalty scored)

11 November Prime Rd QF Leg 1	Vissel Kobe	0–1	Machida Zelvia	Kobe
	Mitchell Duke 85'; Kim Min Tae (yellow card) 37'	Report	Erik (yellow card) 45+1'; Matheus Thuler (yellow card) 63'	Stadium: Noevir Stadium Kobe; Attendance: 5,695; Referee: Koichiro Fukushima

15 November Prime Rd QF Leg 2	Machida Zelvia	1–1	Vissel Kobe	Tokyo
	Kessman Egbus Mikuni 81'; Kim Min Tae (yellow card) 35'; Kosei Tani (yellow card) 89'	Report	Ren Komatsu 85'; Erik (yellow card) 40'; Yoshinori Muto (yellow card) 80'	Stadium: Machida GION Stadium; Attendance: 3,803; Referee: Futoshi Nakamura

Machida Zelvia won 2–1 on aggregate.

24 March Semi Final Leg 1	Urawa Red Diamonds	–	Machida Zelvia	Saitama
				Stadium: Saitama Stadium 2002

28 March Semi Final Leg 2	Machida Zelvia	–	Urawa Red Diamonds	Tokyo
				Stadium: Machida GION Stadium

=== AFC Champions League ===
Pos	Team	Pld	W	D	L	GF	GA	GD	Pts	Qualification	MCZ	PKR	SHS	TAM
1	(Japan) Machida Zelvia (A)	4	4	0	0	6	1	+5	12	Advance to round of 16	—	2–0	2–1	–
2	(Cambodia) PKR Svay Rieng	4	2	1	1	7	3	+4	7	Advance to round of 16	–	—	0–0	2–0
3	(China) Shanghai Shenhua	4	1	1	2	3	4	−1	4		0–1	–	—	2–1
4	(Singapore) Tampines Rovers (E)	4	0	0	4	2	10	−8	0		0–1	1–5	–	—

Updated to match(es) played on 5 November 2026. Source: ACL2
Rules for classification: Tiebreakers
(A) Advance to a further round; (E) Eliminated

17 September 2026 1	Machida Zelvia (Japan)	2–0	(Cambodia) PKR Svay Rieng	Machida, Japan
	Mitch Duke 20'; Tete Yengi 60'; Takahiro Akimoto (yellow card) 78'	Report	Faris Hammouti (yellow card) 25'	Stadium: Machida Stadium; Attendance: 2,753; Referee: Ammar Abo Alo (Syria)

15 October 2026 2	Tampines Rovers (Singapore)	0–1	(Japan) Machida Zelvia	Jalan Besar, Singapore
	Koya Kazama (yellow card) 39'	Report	Irfan Fandi 90+4' (o.g.); Hokuto Shimoda (yellow card) 84'	Stadium: Jalan Besar Stadium; Attendance: 947; Referee: Hussain Al-Showaikh (Bahrain)

29 October 2026 3	Shanghai Shenhua (China)	0–1	(Japan) Machida Zelvia	Shanghai, China
	Xie Pengfei (yellow card) 77'	Report	Ryōhei Shirasaki 28'	Stadium: Shanghai Stadium; Attendance: 20,698; Referee: Payam Heydari (Iran)

5 November 2026 4	Machida Zelvia (Japan)	2–1	(China) Shanghai Shenhua	Machida, Japan
	Hokuto Shimoda 29'; Keiya Sento 78'; Takahiro Akimoto 65'; Mitch Duke (yellow card) 21'	Report	Rafael Ratão 59'; Luís Asué (yellow card) 48'; Xu Haoyang (yellow card) 90+4'	Stadium: Machida Stadium; Attendance: 3,474; Referee: Qasim Al-Hatmi (Oman)

26 November 2026 5	PKR Svay Rieng (Cambodia)	–	(Japan) Machida Zelvia	Phnom Penh, Cambodia
		Report		Stadium: Morodok Techo National Stadium

3 December 2026 6	Machida Zelvia (Japan)	–	(Singapore) Tampines Rovers	Machida, Japan
		Report		Stadium: Machida Stadium

== Team statistics ==
=== Appearances and goals ===
As of 21 Nov 2026

No.	Pos.	Player	J1 League		Emperor's Cup		J.League Cup		2026/27 AFC Champions League Two		Total	
No.	Pos.	Player	Apps.	Goals	Apps.	Goals	Apps.	Goals	Apps.	Goals	Apps.	Goals
1	GK	(Japan) Kosei Tani	15	0	1	0	3	0	2	0	21	0
2	DF	(Netherlands) Thomas Ouwejan	6+1	0	1	0	1+1	0	1+1	0	12	0
3	DF	(Japan) Gen Shoji	15	0	1	0	2+1	0	1	0	20	0
4	MF	(Japan) Ryuho Kikuchi	3	0	1	0	0	0	0	0	4	0
5	DF	(Kosovo) (Sweden) Ibrahim Drešević	2+5	0	1	0	2+1	0	4	0	14	0
6	DF	(Japan) (Nigeria) Henry Hiroki Mochizuki	8+4	2	1+1	0	2+1	0	2+2	0	21	2
7	MF	(Japan) Yuki Soma	15	3	0+1	0	0	0	0+4	0	19	3
8	MF	(Japan) Keiya Sento	1+4	0	2	0	3	0	4	1	14	1
9	FW	(Japan) Kōki Ogawa	10+2	4	0+1	1	1	0	0+4	0	18	5
13	GK	(Japan) Tatsuya Morita	0	0	1	0	0	0	2	0	3	0
14	FW	(Japan) Yūsuke Matsuo	0+6	1	2	1	0	0	1	0	9	2
15	FW	(Australia) Mitch Duke	4+7	1	1+1	1	2+1	1	4	1	20	4
16	MF	(Japan) Hiroyuki Mae	15	1	0+1	0	3	0	0+1	0	20	1
17	GK	(Japan) (Myanmar) Kaung Zan Mara	0	0	0	0	0	0	0	0	0	0
18	MF	(Japan) Hokuto Shimoda	1+6	0	2	0	2+1	0	4	1	16	1
20	FW	(Japan) Takuma Nishimura	8+6	5	2	0	2+1	0	4	0	23	5
23	MF	(Japan) Ryōhei Shirasaki	3+8	1	1	0	1+2	0	3	1	18	2
24	DF	(South Korea) Kim Min-tae	3+2	0	1	0	2	0	3+1	0	12	0
28	MF	(South Korea) Cha Je-hoon	0	0	0	0	0	0	0	0	0	0
31	MF	(Israel) (Portugal) Neta Lavi	10+2	2	0	0	1+1	0	0	0	14	2
33	DF	(Japan) Takahiro Akimoto	13+1	3	1	0	3	0	1+3	0	22	3
34	MF	(Japan) Futa Tokumura	0+4	0	0+1	0	0+1	0	4	0	10	0
38	MF	(Japan) Tenshiro Takasaki	0	0	0	0	0	0	0	0	0	0
50	DF	(Japan) Daihachi Okamura	11+1	1	1+1	0	1	0	1+1	0	17	1
55	GK	(Japan) (United States) Anton Burns	0	0	0	0	0	0	0	0	0	0
77	DF	(Japan) Takumi Narasaka	0	0	0	0	0	0	0	0	0	0
79	MF	(Japan) (Nigeria) Kessman Egbus Mikuni	0	0	0	0	0+2	1	0	0	2	1
88	DF	(Japan) Hotaka Nakamura	10+4	2	1+1	1	2	0	3	0	21	3
99	FW	(Australia) (South Sudan) (England) Tete Yengi	9+4	3	0+1	1	0+1	0	0+3	1	18	5
Players featured on a match for the team, but left the club mid-season permanently
9	FW	(Japan) Shōta Fujio	0+2	0	0	0	0	0	0	0	2	0
19	DF	(Japan) Yūta Nakayama	3	1	0	0	0	0	0	0	3	1
27	FW	(Brazil) Erik	0	0	0	0	0	0	0	0	0	0
Players featured on a match for the team, but left the club mid-season on loan transfer
11	MF	(Japan) Asahi Masuyama	0	0	1	0	0	0	0	0	1	0
39	MF	(Chile) (Japan) Byron Vásquez	0	0	0	0	0	0	0	0	0	0
49	MF	(Japan) Kanji Kuwayama	0	0	0	0	0	0	0	0	0	0
