= Aba Annaýew =

- Born: Yzgant, Russian Turkestan
- Relatives: Berdimuhamed (brother) Mälikguly (nephew) Gurbanguly (great-nephew)

Aba Annaýew (1900-1970) was the great-uncle of Gurbanguly Berdimuhamedow, the second president of Turkmenistan. Being part of the current presidential family of Turkmenistan, he is an important figure in the official narrative and, consequently, in the national narrative.

== Official narrative ==
As mentioned in Ruhnama, a treaty about the Turkmen national identity written by Saparmyrat Nyýazow, first president of Turkmenistan, taking care of horses is a virtue of the Turkmen people. During the presidency of Gurbanguly Berdimuhamedow, the importance of this virtue greatly increased within the national narrative and was embodied by Aba Annaýew, the president's great-uncle.

Little is known about his life. Current officials portray Aba Annaýew as a jockey and "master breeder" of Ahalteke horses. It is said that he actively preserved the "purity" of the species, contributed to developing Turkmen equestrian art, and transmitted it by forming new generations of breeders.

== Legacy ==
Although the truthfulness of Aba Annaýew's contribution to the Turkmen people is questionable, his name was given to several places throughout the country, mostly around Aşgabat and places of power:

- Aba Annaýew, previously known as Çüli or Gökdere, a village then a town (since 2023) in Kärizek District near Arkadag.
- Aba Annaýew International Horse Breeding Academy, a research center in Arkadag.
- Streets in Aşgabat, in Arkadag.

As an equestrian center was unveiled in 2016 in the village named after Aba Annaýew, RFE/RL for Turkmenistan asked: "Does anyone know anything about Aba Annaýew and his contribution to equestrian disciplines?" Geldi Kärizow, former head of the Turkmenistan Equestrian State Association, notes there are "more worthy jockeys."
