= 2026–27 AFC Champions League Two =

Tournament details
- Dates: Qualifying: 12–31 August 2026; Competition proper: 15 September 2026 – 15 May 2027
- Teams: Competition proper: 32; Total: 35 (from 24 associations)

Tournament statistics
- Matches played: 64
- Goals scored: 165 (2.58 per match)
- Attendance: 292,588 (4,572 per match)
- Top scorer(s): (Brazil) Malcom (Bosnia and Herzegovina) Marin Jurina (4 goals each)
- All statistics correct as of 5 November 2026.

The 2026–27 AFC Champions League Two is the 23rd edition of the Asia's second-tier club football tournament, organized by the Asian Football Confederation (AFC), and the third under the AFC Champions League Two title.

The tournament features 32 teams in the group stage. The winner will qualify for the preliminary stage of the 2027–28 AFC Champions League Elite, if they have not already qualified through their domestic performance.

Gamba Osaka were the reigning champions. They were unable to defend their title as they advanced to participate in the AFC Champions League Elite league stage.

== Association team allocation ==
The associations are allocated slots according to their club competitions ranking which was published after the 2024–25 competitions were completed.

Participation for 2025–2026 AFC Champions League Two
Participating
Not participating

West Region (4 groups)
Rank		Member association	Points	Slots	
Rank		Member association	Points	Group stage	Preliminary stage
Zone	AFC	Member association	Points	Group stage	Preliminary stage
1	1	Saudi Arabia	119.957	1	0
2	4	United Arab Emirates	74.466	1 (+1 ACLE)	0
3	5	Qatar	69.326	1	0
4	6	Iran	68.907	1	0
5	9	Uzbekistan	49.821	1	0
6	12	Iraq	39.280	1	0
7	13	Jordan	36.905	1 (+1 ACLE)	0
8	16	Bahrain	27.233	2	0
9	17	Oman	26.069	2	0
10	18	India	24.958	0	2
11	20	Turkmenistan	24.211	0	1
12	21	Kuwait	21.260	0 (+1 ACGL)	1
Total		Participating associations: 12		14	4
Total		Participating associations: 12		18	

East Region (4 groups)
Rank		Member association	Points	Slots	
Rank		Member association	Points	Group stage	Preliminary stage
Zone	AFC	Member association	Points	Group stage	Preliminary stage
1	2	Japan	107.663	1	0
2	3	South Korea	90.982	1 (+1 ACLE)	0
3	7	Thailand	54.873	1	0
4	8	China	54.682	1	0
5	10	Australia	40.420	1 (+1 ACLE)	0
6	11	Malaysia	40.039	1	0
7	14	Vietnam	35.038	1	0
8	15	Singapore	29.405	2	0
9	19	Hong Kong	24.436	2	0
10	23	Cambodia	20.112	2	0
11	25	Indonesia	18.653	0	1
12	27	Philippines	16.706	0	1
Total		Participating associations: 12		15	2
Total		Participating associations: 12		17	

Notes

1. India (IND): The AFC granted India a one-season exemption from the mandatory 24-match league requirement for play-off slot.
2. AFC Slots (AFC): The indirect slot received a bye to the Group Stage in accordance with the relevant Competition Regulations.

== Teams ==
Qualified teams for the 2026–27 AFC Champions League Two
Entry round	West Region			East Region		
Group stage	Team	Qualifying method	App. (last)	Team	Qualifying method	App. (last)
Group stage	(United Arab Emirates) Al-Jazira	2026–27 AFC Champions League Elite preliminary stage losers	1st	(Australia) Adelaide United	2026–27 AFC Champions League Elite preliminary stage losers	1st
Group stage	(Jordan) Al-Hussein	2026–27 AFC Champions League Elite preliminary stage losers	4th (2025–26)	(South Korea) Gangwon FC	2026–27 AFC Champions League Elite preliminary stage losers	1st
Group stage	(Saudi Arabia) Al Taawoun	2025–26 Saudi Pro League sixth place	2nd (2024–25)	(Japan) Machida Zelvia	2025 Emperor's Cup winners	1st
Group stage	(United Arab Emirates) Al Wahda	2025–26 UAE Pro League fifth place	1st	(South Korea) FC Seoul	2025 K League 1 sixth place	1st
Group stage	(Qatar) Al-Rayyan	2025–26 Qatar Stars League third place	2nd (2010)	(Thailand) BG Pathum United	2025–26 Thai League 1 fourth place	2nd (2025–26)
Group stage	(Iran) Gol Gohar	2025-26 Persian Gulf Pro League fourth place	1st	(China) Shanghai Shenhua	2025 Chinese Super League runners-up	1st
Group stage	(Uzbekistan) Nasaf	2025 Uzbekistan Super League third place	5th (2024–25)	(Australia) Melbourne Victory	2025–26 A-League Men fourth place	1st
Group stage	(Iraq) Al-Shorta	2025–26 Iraq Stars League runners-up	3rd (2015)	(Malaysia) Kuching City	2025–26 Malaysia Super League runners-up	1st
Group stage	(Jordan) Al-Faisaly	2025–26 Jordanian Pro League runners-up	12th (2021)	(Vietnam) Thể Công–Viettel	2025–26 V.League 1 runners-up	2nd (2022)
Group stage	(Bahrain) Al-Muharraq	2025–26 Bahraini Premier League champions	9th (2025–26)	(Singapore) Lion City Sailors	2025–26 Singapore Premier League champions	13th (2025–26)
Group stage	(Bahrain) Al-Khaldiya	2025–26 Bahraini Premier League runners-up	4th (2025–26)	(Singapore) Tampines Rovers	2025–26 Singapore Premier League runners-up	17th (2025–26)
Group stage	(Oman) Al-Seeb	2025–26 Oman Professional League champions	3rd (2025–26)	(Hong Kong) Kitchee	2025–26 Hong Kong Premier League champions	9th (2020)
Group stage	(Oman) Al-Nahda	2025–26 Sultan Qaboos Cup winners	5th (2023–24)	(Hong Kong) Tai Po	2025–26 Hong Kong FA Cup winners	4th (2025–26)
Group stage	Al-Kuwait	2025–26 AFC Challenge League winners	14th (2024–25)	(Cambodia) PKR Svay Rieng	2025–26 Cambodian Premier League champions	2nd (2020)
Group stage				(Cambodia) Phnom Penh Crown	2025–26 Cambodian Premier League runners-up	4th (2023–24)
Preliminary stage	(India) East Bengal	2025–26 Indian Super League champions	10th (2024–25)	(Indonesia) Persib	2025–26 Indonesia Super League champions	4th (2025–26)
Preliminary stage	(India) Goa	2025–26 AIFF Super Cup winners	2nd (2025–26)	(Philippines) Manila Digger	2025–26 Philippines Football League champions	2nd (2025–26)
Preliminary stage	(Turkmenistan) Arkadag	2025 Ýokary Liga champions	2nd (2025–26)			
Preliminary stage	(Kuwait) Al-Arabi	2025–26 Kuwaiti Premier League runners-up	4th (2023)			

Notes

1. Australia (AUS): As 2025 Australia Cup winners Newcastle Jets qualified for the Champions League Elite via their league position, the spot reserved for the Australia Cup winners was transferred to the next highest Australian team in the 2025–26 A-League Men not already qualified for continental football.
2. Bahrain (BHR): Al-Muharraq qualified as the 2025–26 Bahraini King's Cup winners.
3. Iran (IRN): The 2025–26 Persian Gulf Pro League was left unfinished due to the 2026 Iran war, as well as the presence of the Iran national team at the 2026 World Cup, and most teams opposed continuing the league. Also, continuing the 2025–26 Hazfi Cup, which had previously been supposed to determine Iran's representative in the AFC Champions League Two, was not possible. Therefore, the Football Federation of Iran had to choose Iran's representative from the unfinished league table. Sepahan (the third-placed team) did not qualify due to failing to obtain a professional license, and another team had to be substituted. Before any final decision, the Secretary General of the Football Federation introduced Gol Gohar as Iran's representative to the AFC, and this selection was registered. However, Gol Gohar had played one more match than its rivals, and the small points difference between the fourth to sixth teams caused the Football Federation to stipulate that if Gol Gohar's complaint case against Chadormalu was handled by June 21, this selection would be final. But due to Persepolis's objection and the failure to issue a ruling within the stipulated deadline, a three-team playoff tournament was held to determine Iran's representative in Asia among Gol Gohar, Chadormalu, and Persepolis, in which Chadormalu emerged victorious. After the playoff, the Football Federation, through numerous follow-ups, sought to replace Gol Gohar with Chadormalu, but the AFC opposed this replacement, citing the Secretary General's initial letter. Subsequently, the Disciplinary Committee confirmed the presence of an ineligible player in Chadormalu's lineup in the previous match (which Chadormalu had won 5–1) and changed the result to a 3–0 victory for Gol Gohar, which, after being upheld on appeal, confirmed Gol Gohar's fourth-place position and selection.
4. Iraq (IRQ): As the 2025–26 Iraq FA Cup was cancelled due to scheduling constraints, their AFC Champions League Two group stage spot was passed to the 2025–26 Iraq Stars League runners-up.
5. Jordan (JOR): Al-Faisaly qualified as the 2025–26 Jordanian Pro League runners-up because both finalists of the 2025–26 Jordan FA Cup could not take the reserved spot: Al-Hussein already qualified for the 2026–27 AFC Champions League Elite, and Al-Ramtha failed to obtain an AFC license.
6. Kuwait (KUW): As Al-Kuwait won the 2025–26 Kuwaiti Premier League main league and qualified to group stage as 2025–26 AFC Challenge League champions, the spot reserved for the league champions was transferred to the second-placed team in the league.
7. Malaysia (MAS): As 2025 Malaysia FA Cup winners Johor Darul Ta'zim qualified for the Champions League Elite via their league position, the spot reserved for the Malaysia FA Cup winners was transferred to the runners-up of the 2025–26 Malaysia Super League.
8. Saudi Arabia (KSA): As the 2025–26 Saudi King's Cup winners Al Hilal qualified for the AFC Champions League Elite via league position, the spot reserved for the King's Cup was transferred to the 6th place team.
9. Singapore (SGP): As 2025–26 Singapore Cup winners Lion City Sailors qualified for the Champions League Two via their league position, the spot reserved for the Singapore Cup winners was transferred to the runners-up in the 2025–26 Singapore Premier League.
10. United Arab Emirates (UAE): As Al Ain won the 2025–26 UAE President's Cup final, the spot reserved for the UAE fourth placed team was transferred to the fifth placed team in the league.
11. BYE: Received a bye to the Group Stage in accordance with the relevant Competition Regulations

== Schedule ==
The schedule of the competition is expected to be as follows.

Schedule for 2026–27 AFC Champions League Two
Stage	Round	Draw date	West region	East region
Preliminary stage		No draw (Note: Pre-determined format)	12 August 2026	31 August 2026
Group stage	Matchday 1	18 August 2026	15–16 September 2026	16–17 September 2026
Group stage	Matchday 2	18 August 2026	13–14 October 2026	14–15 October 2026
Group stage	Matchday 3	18 August 2026	27–28 October 2026	28–29 October 2026
Group stage	Matchday 4	18 August 2026	3–4 November 2026	4–5 November 2026
Group stage	Matchday 5	18 August 2026	24–25 November 2026	25–26 November 2026
Group stage	Matchday 6	18 August 2026	8–9 December 2026	2–3 December 2026
Knockout stage	Round of 16	17 December 2026	9–10 and 16–17 February 2027	10–11 and 17–18 February 2027
Knockout stage	Quarter-finals	17 December 2026	2–3 and 16–17 March 2027	10–11 and 17–18 March 2027
Knockout stage	Semi-finals	17 December 2026	6 and 13 April 2027	7 and 14 April 2027
Knockout stage	Final	17 December 2026	15 May 2027	

== Preliminary stage ==
The three winners of the preliminary stage (two from West Region and one from East Region) advanced to the group stage to join the 29 direct entrants. The losers of the qualifying play-offs will enter the group stage of the 2026–27 AFC Challenge League.

Team 1	Score	Team 2
West Region
East Bengal (India)	4–1 (a.e.t.)	(Kuwait) Al-Arabi
Arkadag (Turkmenistan)	3–0	(India) Goa
East Region
Persib (Indonesia)	1–0	(Philippines) Manila Digger

=== West Region ===
12 August 2026
19:00 UTC+5:30

East Bengal (India)	4–1 (a.e.t.)	(Kuwait) Al-Arabi
Gupta 90'; Rashid 108'; Lalhlansanga 117'; Danu 120'	AFC Report; GSA Report	Iwuala 76' (pen.)

Salt Lake Stadium, Kolkata
Attendance: 17,567
Referee: Sadullo Gulmurodi (Tajikistan)

12 August 2026
20:00 UTC+5

Arkadag (Turkmenistan)	3–0	(India) Goa
Diniýew 61'; Myratberdiýew 65'; Sapargulýyew 75'	AFC Report; GSA Report

Arkadag Stadium, Arkadag
Attendance: 10,000
Referee: Abdullah Jamali (Kuwait)

=== East Region ===
31 August 2026
19:00 UTC+7

Persib (Indonesia)	1–0	(Philippines) Manila Digger
Peralta 89'	AFC Report; GSA Report

Si Jalak Harupat Stadium, Soreang (Note: Persib played their preliminary stage match at the Si Jalak Harupat Stadium in Soreang, instead of their regular home ground, Gelora Bandung Lautan Api Stadium in Bandung, which was undergoing major pitch works.)
Attendance: 30
Referee: Alex King (Australia)

== Group stage ==
Location of the clubs participating in the group stage.
Brown: Group A; Cyan: Group B; Orange: Group C; Yellow: Group D; Pink: Group E;
Green: Group F; Blue: Group G; Red: Group H
Location of the 2026–27 AFC Champions League Two group stage teams in the Persian Gulf area and surrounding region.
Locations of the 2026–27 AFC Champions League Two teams in China, Japan and South Korea.

=== West Region ===
==== Group A ====
Pos	Team	Pld	W	D	L	GF	GA	GD	Pts	Qualification	WAH	KSC	NAS	KHA
1	(United Arab Emirates) Al Wahda	4	3	0	1	8	6	+2	9	Advance to round of 16	—	3–2	–	1–2
2	Al-Kuwait	4	2	0	2	8	7	+1	6	Advance to round of 16	–	—	2–3	3–1
3	(Uzbekistan) Nasaf	4	1	1	2	4	5	−1	4		1–2	0–1	—	–
4	(Bahrain) Al-Khaldiya	4	1	1	2	4	6	−2	4		1–2	–	0–0	—

Updated to match(es) played on 4 November 2026. Source: ACL2
Rules for classification: Tiebreakers

==== Group B ====
Pos	Team	Pld	W	D	L	GF	GA	GD	Pts	Qualification	JAZ	ARK	MUH	GOL
1	(United Arab Emirates) Al Jazira (A)	4	3	1	0	9	3	+6	10	Advance to round of 16	—	2–1	4–2	–
2	(Turkmenistan) Arkadag	4	2	1	1	3	2	+1	7	Advance to round of 16	–	—	1–0	1–0
3	(Bahrain) Al-Muharraq	4	1	0	3	4	8	−4	3		0–3	–	—	2–0
4	(Iran) Gol Gohar	4	0	2	2	0	3	−3	2		0–0	0–0	–	—

Updated to match(es) played on 4 November 2026. Source: ACL2
Rules for classification: Tiebreakers
(A) Advance to a further round

==== Group C ====
Pos	Team	Pld	W	D	L	GF	GA	GD	Pts	Qualification	TAW	RAY	FAI	NAH
1	(Saudi Arabia) Al Taawoun (A)	4	3	1	0	8	3	+5	10	Advance to round of 16	—	2–1	3–1	–
2	(Qatar) Al-Rayyan	4	3	0	1	11	6	+5	9	Advance to round of 16	–	—	4–3	2–0
3	(Jordan) Al-Faisaly	4	1	0	3	6	9	−3	3		0–2	–	—	2–0
4	(Oman) Al-Nahda (E)	4	0	1	3	2	9	−7	1		1–1	1–4	–	—

Updated to match(es) played on 4 November 2026. Source: ACL2
Rules for classification: Tiebreakers
(A) Advance to a further round; (E) Eliminated

==== Group D ====
Pos	Team	Pld	W	D	L	GF	GA	GD	Pts	Qualification	SHO	HUS	SEE	EBG
1	(Iraq) Al-Shorta (A)	4	3	1	0	8	3	+5	10	Advance to round of 16	—	1–1	1–0	–
2	(Jordan) Al-Hussein	4	1	2	1	6	6	0	5	Advance to round of 16	0–3	—	–	2–2
3	(Oman) Al-Seeb	4	1	1	2	2	4	−2	4		–	0–3	—	0–0
4	(India) East Bengal	4	0	2	2	4	7	−3	2		2–3	–	0–2	—

Updated to match(es) played on 3 November 2026. Source: ACL2
Rules for classification: Tiebreakers
(A) Advance to a further round

=== East Region ===
==== Group E ====
Pos	Team	Pld	W	D	L	GF	GA	GD	Pts	Qualification	SIB	SEO	MVC	TCV
1	(Indonesia) Persib (A)	4	4	0	0	6	1	+5	12	Advance to round of 16	—	–	2–0	1–0
2	(South Korea) FC Seoul	4	2	0	2	8	4	+4	6	Advance to round of 16	0–1	—	–	3–0
3	(Australia) Melbourne Victory	4	1	1	2	5	5	0	4		1–2	3–0	—	–
4	(Vietnam) Thể Công–Viettel	4	0	1	3	1	10	−9	1		–	0–5	1–1	—

Updated to match(es) played on 4 November 2026. Source: ACL2
Rules for classification: Tiebreakers
(A) Advance to a further round

==== Group F ====
Pos	Team	Pld	W	D	L	GF	GA	GD	Pts	Qualification	LCS	BGP	ADE	TPF
1	(Singapore) Lion City Sailors	4	3	1	0	9	1	+8	10	Advance to round of 16	—	1–1	5–0	–
2	(Thailand) BG Pathum United	4	2	1	1	9	4	+5	7	Advance to round of 16	–	—	1–2	4–1
3	(Australia) Adelaide United	4	2	0	2	5	8	−3	6		0–2	–	—	3–0
4	(Hong Kong) Tai Po (E)	4	0	0	4	1	11	−10	0		0–1	0–3	–	—

Updated to match(es) played on 5 November 2026. Source: ACL2
Rules for classification: Tiebreakers
(E) Eliminated

==== Group G ====
Pos	Team	Pld	W	D	L	GF	GA	GD	Pts	Qualification	MCZ	PKR	SHS	TAM
1	(Japan) Machida Zelvia (A)	4	4	0	0	6	1	+5	12	Advance to round of 16	—	2–0	2–1	–
2	(Cambodia) PKR Svay Rieng	4	2	1	1	7	3	+4	7	Advance to round of 16	–	—	0–0	2–0
3	(China) Shanghai Shenhua	4	1	1	2	3	4	−1	4		0–1	–	—	2–1
4	(Singapore) Tampines Rovers (E)	4	0	0	4	2	10	−8	0		0–1	1–5	–	—

Updated to match(es) played on 5 November 2026. Source: ACL2
Rules for classification: Tiebreakers
(A) Advance to a further round; (E) Eliminated

==== Group H ====
Pos	Team	Pld	W	D	L	GF	GA	GD	Pts	Qualification	PPC	KIT	KUC	GWN
1	(Cambodia) Phnom Penh Crown	4	3	0	1	7	4	+3	9	Advance to round of 16	—	2–0	2–1	–
2	(Hong Kong) Kitchee	4	1	2	1	3	4	−1	5	Advance to round of 16	2–1	—	–	0–0
3	(Malaysia) Kuching City	4	1	1	2	4	4	0	4		–	1–1	—	2–0
4	(South Korea) Gangwon FC	4	1	1	2	2	4	−2	4		1–2	–	1–0	—

Updated to match(es) played on 5 November 2026. Source: ACL2
Rules for classification: Tiebreakers

== Knockout stage ==
In the knockout stage, 16 teams will play a single-elimination tournament. Each tie will be played on a home-and-away two-legged basis, except the final which will be played as a single match. Extra time and penalty shoot-out will be used to decide the winners if necessary (Regulations Article 10). The order of matches (home vs away) will be determined at the draw, except for the final. The final venue was pre-determined on a rotation basis, with the match hosted by the team from the East region. The draw for the knockout stage is scheduled to be held on 17 December 2026. Teams from the same group cannot be drawn against each other.

=== Bracket ===
Round of 16
East Region
West Region

Quarter-finals

Semi-finals

Final
15 May – TBC

=== Round of 16 ===
The first legs will be played between 9 and 10 February, and the second legs between 17 and 18 February 2027.

Team 1	Agg.	Team 2	1st leg	2nd leg

== Top scorers ==
Team eliminated for this round / inactive for this round / Matches voided by AFC / Player left the team

Rank	Player	Team	MD1	MD2	MD3	MD4	MD5	MD6	R16-1	R16-2	QF1	QF2	SF1	SF2	F	Total
1	(Brazil) Malcom	(United Arab Emirates) Al Jazira		1	3											4
1	(Bosnia and Herzegovina) Marin Jurina	(Thailand) BG Pathum United		1		3										4
3	(Jordan) Aref Al-Haj	(Jordan) Al-Hussein		3												3
3	(New Zealand) Moses Dyer	(Cambodia) Phnom Penh Crown	2	1												3
3	(Argentina) Facundo Kruspzky	(United Arab Emirates) Al Wahda		2	1											3
3	(Nigeria) Kingsley Kuku	(Iraq) Al-Shorta		1		2										3
3	(Montenegro) Balša Sekulić	(Indonesia) Persib			2	1										3
3	(Brazil) Gleison	(Bahrain) Al-Khaldiya		1	1	1										3
3	(Portugal) Tiago Alves	(Cambodia) PKR Svay Rieng			2	1										3
3	(Guadeloupe) Matthias Phaëton	(Singapore) Lion City Sailors		1		2										3
3	(Uzbekistan) Bobur Abdikholikov	(Uzbekistan) Nasaf		1		2										3

Note

- Goals scored in the qualifying play-offs and matches voided by AFC are not counted when determining top scorer (Regulations Article 64.4)

== See also ==
- 2026–27 AFC Champions League Elite
- 2026–27 AFC Challenge League
- 2026–27 AFC Women's Champions League
