= 2026–27 AFC Champions League Two group stage =

Football tournament group stage

The 2026–27 AFC Champions League Two league stage is being played from 15 September and will end on 9 December 2026. The top two teams from each group will qualify for the knockout stage.

== Draw ==
The draw for the group stage was held on 18 August 2026 in Kuala Lumpur, Malaysia. The 32 teams were drawn into eight groups of four: four groups each in the West Region (Groups A–D) and the East Region (Groups E–H).

=== Seeding ===
For each region, teams were seeded into four pots and drawn into the relevant positions within each group, based on their association ranking and their seeding within their association. Teams from the same association could not be drawn into the same group.

Region	Groups	Pot 1	Pot 2	Pot 3	Pot 4
West Region	A–D	(United Arab Emirates) Al Jazira^{ACLE}	(Qatar) Al-Rayyan	(Jordan) Al-Faisaly	(Bahrain) Al-Khaldiya
West Region	A–D	(Jordan) Al-Hussein^{ACLE}	(Iran) Gol Gohar	(Bahrain) Al-Muharraq	(Oman) Al-Nahda
West Region	A–D	(Saudi Arabia) Al Taawoun	(Uzbekistan) Nasaf	(Oman) Al-Seeb	(India) East Bengal^{PS}
West Region	A–D	(United Arab Emirates) Al Wahda	(Iraq) Al-Shorta	Al-Kuwait	(Turkmenistan) Arkadag^{PS}
East Region	E–H	(South Korea) Gangwon FC^{ACLE}	(Thailand) BG Pathum United	(Vietnam) Thể Công–Viettel	(Singapore) Tampines Rovers
East Region	E–H	(Australia) Adelaide United^{ACLE}	(China) Shanghai Shenhua	(Singapore) Lion City Sailors	(Hong Kong) Tai Po
East Region	E–H	(Japan) Machida Zelvia	(Australia) Melbourne Victory	(Hong Kong) Kitchee	(Cambodia) Phnom Penh Crown
East Region	E–H	(South Korea) FC Seoul	(Malaysia) Kuching City	(Cambodia) PKR Svay Rieng	(Indonesia) Persib^{PS}

Legend

- ACLE: AFC Champions League Elite qualifying play-off losers
- PS: Preliminary stage winners

== Schedule ==
The schedule of the league stage is as follows:

Round	Dates (West region)	Dates (East region)
Matchday 1	15–16 September 2026	16–17 September 2026
Matchday 2	13–14 October 2026	14–15 October 2026
Matchday 3	27–28 October 2026	28–29 October 2026
Matchday 4	3–4 November 2026	4–5 November 2026
Matchday 5	24–25 November 2026	25–26 November 2026
Matchday 6	8–9 December 2026	2–3 December 2026

== Groups ==
=== West Region ===
==== Group A ====
Pos	Team	Pld	W	D	L	GF	GA	GD	Pts	Qualification	WAH	KSC	NAS	KHA
1	(United Arab Emirates) Al Wahda	4	3	0	1	8	6	+2	9	Advance to round of 16	—	3–2	–	1–2
2	Al-Kuwait	4	2	0	2	8	7	+1	6	Advance to round of 16	–	—	2–3	3–1
3	(Uzbekistan) Nasaf	4	1	1	2	4	5	−1	4		1–2	0–1	—	–
4	(Bahrain) Al-Khaldiya	4	1	1	2	4	6	−2	4		1–2	–	0–0	—

Updated to match(es) played on 4 November 2026. Source: ACL2
Rules for classification: Tiebreakers
16 September 2026
20:00 UTC+4

Al Wahda (United Arab Emirates)	3–2	Al-Kuwait
B. Diarra 23'; Rivas 87'; Benteke 90+7'	Report	Khenissi 5'; O. Gonzalez 8'

Al Nahyan Stadium, Abu Dhabi
Attendance: 608
Referee: Ryo Tanimoto (Japan)
16 September 2026
19:00 UTC+3

Al-Khaldiya (Bahrain)	0–0	(Uzbekistan) Nasaf
	Report

Bahrain National Stadium, Riffa
Attendance: 540
Referee: Wiwat Jumpaoon (Thailand)

14 October 2026
18:45 UTC+5

Nasaf (Uzbekistan)	1–2	(United Arab Emirates) Al Wahda
Abdikholikov 47'	Report	Kruspzky 23', 39'

Markaziy Stadium, Qarshi
Attendance: 12,210
Referee: Ahmad Yacoub Ibrahim (Jordan)
14 October 2026
19:00 UTC+3

Al-Kuwait	3–1	(Bahrain) Al-Khaldiya
Zayid 45+1'; Nasser 65' (pen.), 90+6'	Report	Gleison 80'

Jaber Al-Mubarak Al-Hamad Stadium, Sulaibikhat
Attendance: 920
Referee: Thoriq Alkatiri (Indonesia)

28 October 2026
18:45 UTC+5

Nasaf (Uzbekistan)	0–1	Al-Kuwait
	Report	Daham 40'

Markaziy Stadium, Qarshi
Attendance: 4,610
Referee: Abdulhadi Al-Ruaile (Qatar)
28 October 2026
21:15 UTC+3

Al-Khaldiya (Bahrain)	1–2	(United Arab Emirates) Al Wahda
Gleison 65'	Report	Kruspzky 43'; Zhir 74'

Bahrain National Stadium, Riffa
Attendance: 327
Referee: Shen Yinhao (China)

4 November 2026
20:00 UTC+4

Al Wahda (United Arab Emirates)	1–2	(Bahrain) Al-Khaldiya
Benteke 55'	Report	Gleison 67'; Bouhra 72'

Al Nahyan Stadium, Abu Dhabi
Attendance: 334
Referee: Sadullo Gulmurodi (Tajikistan)
4 November 2026
19:00 UTC+3

Al-Kuwait	2–3	(Uzbekistan) Nasaf
Khenissi 31' (pen.); Frieh 34'	Report	Abdikholikov 57', 67'; Rustamov 81'

Jaber Al-Mubarak Al-Hamad Stadium, Sulaibikhat
Attendance: 800
Referee: Resul Mämmedow (Turkmenistan)

25 November 2026
18:45 UTC+5

Nasaf (Uzbekistan)	v	(Bahrain) Al-Khaldiya

Markaziy Stadium, Qarshi
25 November 2026
19:00 UTC+3

Al-Kuwait	v	(United Arab Emirates) Al Wahda

Jaber Al-Mubarak Al-Hamad Stadium, Sulaibikhat

9 December 2026
19:00 UTC+3

Al-Khaldiya (Bahrain)	v	Al-Kuwait

Bahrain National Stadium, Riffa
9 December 2026
20:00 UTC+4

Al Wahda (United Arab Emirates)	v	(Uzbekistan) Nasaf

Al Nahyan Stadium, Abu Dhabi

==== Group B ====
Pos	Team	Pld	W	D	L	GF	GA	GD	Pts	Qualification	JAZ	ARK	MUH	GOL
1	(United Arab Emirates) Al Jazira (A)	4	3	1	0	9	3	+6	10	Advance to round of 16	—	2–1	4–2	–
2	(Turkmenistan) Arkadag	4	2	1	1	3	2	+1	7	Advance to round of 16	–	—	1–0	1–0
3	(Bahrain) Al-Muharraq	4	1	0	3	4	8	−4	3		0–3	–	—	2–0
4	(Iran) Gol Gohar	4	0	2	2	0	3	−3	2		0–0	0–0	–	—

Updated to match(es) played on 4 November 2026. Source: ACL2
Rules for classification: Tiebreakers
(A) Advance to a further round
15 September 2026
18:45 UTC+5

Gol Gohar (Iran)	0–0	(United Arab Emirates) Al Jazira
	Report

Hisor Central Stadium, Hisor (Tajikistan) (Note: Gol Gohar played their home matches at the Hisor Central Stadium in Hisor, Tajikistan, instead of their regular home ground, the Gol Gohar Sport Complex in Sirjan, Iran, due to the 2025–2026 Iranian protesters massacres and 2026 Iran war.)
Attendance: 740
Referee: Rustam Lutfullin (Uzbekistan)
15 September 2026
18:45 UTC+5

Arkadag (Turkmenistan)	1–0	(Bahrain) Al-Muharraq
Saparow 52'	Report

Arkadag Stadium, Arkadag
Attendance: 10,000
Referee: Nivon Robesh Gamini (Sri Lanka)

14 October 2026
20:00 UTC+4

Al Jazira (United Arab Emirates)	2–1	(Turkmenistan) Arkadag
Malcom 55' (pen.); Mujkić 90+6'	Report	Bäşimow 66'

Mohammed bin Zayed Stadium, Abu Dhabi
Attendance: 1,620
Referee: Abdullah Jamali (Kuwait)
14 October 2026
19:00 UTC+3

Al-Muharraq (Bahrain)	2–0	(Iran) Gol Gohar
Rezende 48' (pen.); Tobares 90+4'	Report

Al-Seeb Stadium, Seeb (Oman) (Note: Due to the ban on Iranian citizens entering Bahrain, Al-Muharraq played their home match at Al-Seeb Stadium, Seeb (Oman) instead of Bahrain National Stadium, Riffa)
Attendance: 300
Referee: Ngô Duy Lân (Vietnam)

28 October 2026
18:45 UTC+5

Gol Gohar (Iran)	0–0	(Turkmenistan) Arkadag
	Report

Hisor Central Stadium, Hisor (Tajikistan)
Attendance: 250
Referee: Nasrullo Kabirov (Tajikistan)
28 October 2026
20:00 UTC+4

Al Jazira (United Arab Emirates)	4–2	(Bahrain) Al-Muharraq
Malcom 52' (pen.), 56', 72'; Bruno 68'	Report	Al-Malood 3', 33'

Mohammed bin Zayed Stadium, Abu Dhabi
Attendance: 1,860
Referee: Mohammed Al-Hoish (Saudi Arabia)

4 November 2026
18:45 UTC+5

Arkadag (Turkmenistan)	1–0	(Iran) Gol Gohar
Ataýew 77'	Report

Arkadag Stadium, Arkadag
Attendance: 10,000
Referee: Razlan Joffri Ali (Malaysia)
4 November 2026
21:15 UTC+3

Al-Muharraq (Bahrain)	0–3	(United Arab Emirates) Al Jazira
	Report	Mello 63'; Bruno 69'; Serrote 90+4'

Bahrain National Stadium, Riffa
Attendance: 3,167
Referee: Ryo Tanimoto (Japan)

25 November 2026
20:00 UTC+4

Al Jazira (United Arab Emirates)	v	(Iran) Gol Gohar

Mohammed bin Zayed Stadium, Abu Dhabi
25 November 2026
19:00 UTC+3

Al-Muharraq (Bahrain)	v	(Turkmenistan) Arkadag

Bahrain National Stadium, Riffa

9 December 2026
18:45 UTC+5

Gol Gohar (Iran)	v	(Bahrain) Al-Muharraq

Hisor Central Stadium, Hisor (Tajikistan)
9 December 2026
18:45 UTC+5

Arkadag (Turkmenistan)	v	(United Arab Emirates) Al Jazira

Arkadag Stadium, Arkadag
Attendance: 10,000

==== Group C ====
Pos	Team	Pld	W	D	L	GF	GA	GD	Pts	Qualification	TAW	RAY	FAI	NAH
1	(Saudi Arabia) Al Taawoun (A)	4	3	1	0	8	3	+5	10	Advance to round of 16	—	2–1	3–1	–
2	(Qatar) Al-Rayyan	4	3	0	1	11	6	+5	9	Advance to round of 16	–	—	4–3	2–0
3	(Jordan) Al-Faisaly	4	1	0	3	6	9	−3	3		0–2	–	—	2–0
4	(Oman) Al-Nahda (E)	4	0	1	3	2	9	−7	1		1–1	1–4	–	—

Updated to match(es) played on 4 November 2026. Source: ACL2
Rules for classification: Tiebreakers
(A) Advance to a further round; (E) Eliminated
16 September 2026
20:00 UTC+4

Al-Nahda (Oman)	1–1	(Saudi Arabia) Al Taawoun
Boumal 81'	Report	Al-Tulayhi 60'

Sultan Qaboos Sports Complex, Muscat
Attendance: 1,087
Referee: Clifford Daypuyat (Philippines)
16 September 2026
21:15 UTC+3

Al-Rayyan (Qatar)	4–3	(Jordan) Al-Faisaly
D. García 6'; Guedes 22'; Alaaeldin 41'; Shehata 73'	Report	Simporé 45+1'; Haddad 78'; Ersan 84'

Ahmad bin Ali Stadium, Al Rayyan
Attendance: 4,312
Referee: Yahya Al-Mulla (United Arab Emirates)

14 October 2026
19:00 UTC+3

Al Taawoun (Saudi Arabia)	2–1	(Qatar) Al-Rayyan
Al-Kuwaykibi 19'; El Bahraoui 38'	Report	Al-Ganehi 32'

Al-Taawoun Stadium, Buraydah
Attendance: 2,573
Referee: Sadullo Gulmurodi (Tajikistan)
14 October 2026
21:15 UTC+3

Al-Faisaly (Jordan)	2–0	(Oman) Al-Nahda
Ahoua 30'; Ersan 76'	Report

Amman International Stadium, Amman
Attendance: 6,995
Referee: Venkatesh Ramachandran (India)

28 October 2026
20:00 UTC+4

Al-Nahda (Oman)	1–4	(Qatar) Al-Rayyan
Al-Ghafri 59' (pen.)	Report	Wesley 3'; Aymen 19'; G. Pereira 64'; Al-Hassan 87'

Sultan Qaboos Sports Complex, Muscat
Attendance: 686
Referee: Ahmad Alaeddin (Lebanon)
28 October 2026
21:15 UTC+3

Al-Faisaly (Jordan)	0–2	(Saudi Arabia) Al Taawoun
	Report	Guiagon 52'; Al-Ghamdi 77'

Amman International Stadium, Amman
Attendance: 8,087
Referee: Ahmed Eisa Darwish (United Arab Emirates)

4 November 2026
19:00 UTC+3

Al-Rayyan (Qatar)	2–0	(Oman) Al-Nahda
Mitrović 78'; Guedes 86'	Report

Ahmad bin Ali Stadium, Al Rayyan
Attendance: 1,013
Referee: Zaid Thamer Mohammed (Iraq)
4 November 2026
21:15 UTC+3

Al Taawoun (Saudi Arabia)	3–1	(Jordan) Al-Faisaly
Guiagon 43'; Hamdallah 48' (pen.), 70'	Report	M. Al-Saedi 58' (o.g.)

Al-Taawoun Stadium, Buraydah
Attendance: 3,338
Referee: Mooud Bonyadifard (Iran)

25 November 2026
19:00 UTC+3

Al-Faisaly (Jordan)	v	(Qatar) Al-Rayyan

Amman International Stadium, Amman
25 November 2026
21:15 UTC+3

Al Taawoun (Saudi Arabia)	v	(Oman) Al-Nahda

Buraydah Stadium, Buraydah

9 December 2026
20:00 UTC+4

Al-Nahda (Oman)	v	(Jordan) Al-Faisaly

Sultan Qaboos Sports Complex, Muscat
9 December 2026
19:00 UTC+3

Al-Rayyan (Qatar)	v	(Saudi Arabia) Al Taawoun

Ahmad bin Ali Stadium, Al Rayyan

==== Group D ====
Pos	Team	Pld	W	D	L	GF	GA	GD	Pts	Qualification	SHO	HUS	SEE	EBG
1	(Iraq) Al-Shorta (A)	4	3	1	0	8	3	+5	10	Advance to round of 16	—	1–1	1–0	–
2	(Jordan) Al-Hussein	4	1	2	1	6	6	0	5	Advance to round of 16	0–3	—	–	2–2
3	(Oman) Al-Seeb	4	1	1	2	2	4	−2	4		–	0–3	—	0–0
4	(India) East Bengal	4	0	2	2	4	7	−3	2		2–3	–	0–2	—

Updated to match(es) played on 3 November 2026. Source: ACL2
Rules for classification: Tiebreakers
(A) Advance to a further round
16 September 2026
19:00 UTC+3

Al-Hussein (Jordan)	2–2	(India) East Bengal
Al-Mardi 61'; Assaf 87'	Report	Ramírez 9'; A. Ali 40'

Amman International Stadium, Amman
Attendance: 1,645
Referee: Ahmad Alaeddin (Lebanon)
16 September 2026
21:15 UTC+3

Al-Shorta (Iraq)	1–0	(Oman) Al-Seeb
Al-Saedi 51'	Report

Al-Zawraa Stadium, Baghdad
Attendance: 3,723
Referee: Zayniddin Alimov (Kyrgyzstan)

13 October 2026
19:15 UTC+5:30

East Bengal (India)	2–3	(Iraq) Al-Shorta
Lalhlansanga 8', 40'	Report	Yahya 14'; Al-Saedi 51'; Kuku 53'

Salt Lake Stadium, Kolkata
Attendance: 12,765
Referee: Majed Al-Shamrani (Saudi Arabia)
13 October 2026
20:00 UTC+4

Al-Seeb (Oman)	0–3	(Jordan) Al-Hussein
	Report	Al-Haj 42', 55', 82'

Al-Seeb Stadium, Seeb
Attendance: 2,350
Referee: Ahmad A'Qashah (Singapore)

27 October 2026
20:00 UTC+4

Al-Seeb (Oman)	0–0	(India) East Bengal
	Report

Al-Seeb Stadium, Seeb
Attendance: 1,120
Referee: Alex King (Australia)
27 October 2026
21:15 UTC+3

Al-Shorta (Iraq)	1–1	(Jordan) Al-Hussein
Barco 90+5' (pen.)	Report	Nasib 29'

Al-Zawraa Stadium, Baghdad
Attendance: 4,137
Referee: Asker Nadjafaliev (Uzbekistan)

3 November 2026
19:15 UTC+5:30

East Bengal (India)	0–2	(Oman) Al-Seeb
	Report	Méyé 85'; Al-Aghbari 90+1'

Salt Lake Stadium, Kolkata
Attendance: 11,735
Referee: Thoriq Alkatiri (Indonesia)
3 November 2026
19:00 UTC+3

Al-Hussein (Jordan)	0–3	(Iraq) Al-Shorta
	Report	Kuku 14', 59'; M. Ali 90+3'

Amman International Stadium, Amman
Attendance: 2,113
Referee: Yahya Al-Mulla (United Arab Emirates)

24 November 2026
19:15 UTC+5:30

East Bengal (India)	v	(Jordan) Al-Hussein

Salt Lake Stadium, Kolkata
24 November 2026
20:00 UTC+4

Al-Seeb (Oman)	v	(Iraq) Al-Shorta

Al-Seeb Stadium, Seeb

8 December 2026
19:00 UTC+3

Al-Hussein (Jordan)	v	(Oman) Al-Seeb

Amman International Stadium, Amman
8 December 2026
19:00 UTC+3

Al-Shorta (Iraq)	v	(India) East Bengal

Al-Zawraa Stadium, Baghdad

=== East Region ===
==== Group E ====
Pos	Team	Pld	W	D	L	GF	GA	GD	Pts	Qualification	SIB	SEO	MVC	TCV
1	(Indonesia) Persib (A)	4	4	0	0	6	1	+5	12	Advance to round of 16	—	–	2–0	1–0
2	(South Korea) FC Seoul	4	2	0	2	8	4	+4	6	Advance to round of 16	0–1	—	–	3–0
3	(Australia) Melbourne Victory	4	1	1	2	5	5	0	4		1–2	3–0	—	–
4	(Vietnam) Thể Công–Viettel	4	0	1	3	1	10	−9	1		–	0–5	1–1	—

Updated to match(es) played on 4 November 2026. Source: ACL2
Rules for classification: Tiebreakers
(A) Advance to a further round
16 September 2026
19:00 UTC+9

FC Seoul (South Korea)	0–1	(Indonesia) Persib
	Report	César 5'

Seoul World Cup Stadium, Seoul
Attendance: 5,385
Referee: Faisal Al-Balawi (Saudi Arabia)
16 September 2026
19:15 UTC+7

Thể Công–Viettel (Vietnam)	1–1	(Australia) Melbourne Victory
Ribamar 62'	Report	Santos 58'

Hàng Đẫy Stadium, Hanoi (Note: Thể Công–Viettel played their home match at the Hàng Đẫy Stadium in Hanoi, instead of their regular home ground, the Mỹ Đình Stadium in Hanoi.)
Attendance: 4,800
Referee: Ismaeel Habib Ali (Bahrain)

14 October 2026
18:45 UTC+11

Melbourne Victory (Australia)	3–0	(South Korea) FC Seoul
May 63'; Santos 73'; Valadon 84'	Report

Melbourne Rectangular Stadium, Melbourne
Attendance: 2,198
Referee: Clifford Daypuyat (Philippines)
14 October 2026
19:15 UTC+7

Persib (Indonesia)	1–0	(Vietnam) Thể Công–Viettel
Peralta 45' (pen.)	Report

Si Jalak Harupat Stadium, Soreang
Attendance: 12,739
Referee: Ahmed Eisa Darwish (United Arab Emirates)

28 October 2026
19:15 UTC+7

Thể Công–Viettel (Vietnam)	0–5	(South Korea) FC Seoul
	Report	Moon Seon-min 8'; A. Oliveira 21'; Hwang Do-yun 29'; Cho Young-wook 34'; Acevedo 54'

Hàng Đẫy Stadium, Hanoi
Attendance: 6,200
Referee: Yoshimi Yamashita (Japan)
28 October 2026
19:15 UTC+7

Persib (Indonesia)	2–0	(Australia) Melbourne Victory
Sekulić 47', 67'	Report

Si Jalak Harupat Stadium, Soreang
Attendance: 15,496
Referee: Sami Al-Ismail (Saudi Arabia)

4 November 2026
18:45 UTC+11

Melbourne Victory (Australia)	1–2	(Indonesia) Persib
César 71' (o.g.)	Report	Menalo 85'; Sekulić 90'

Melbourne Rectangular Stadium, Melbourne
Attendance: 3,000
Referee: Clifford Daypuyat (Philippines)
4 November 2026
19:00 UTC+9

FC Seoul (South Korea)	3–0	(Vietnam) Thể Công–Viettel
Moon Seon-min 68'; A. Oliveira 79'; L. Alves 90' (o.g.)	Report

Seoul World Cup Stadium, Seoul
Attendance: 3,504
Referee: Ammar Abo Alo (Syria)

25 November 2026
18:45 UTC+11

Melbourne Victory (Australia)	v	(Vietnam) Thể Công–Viettel

Kardinia Park, Geelong (Note: Melbourne Victory played their Matchday 5 game at the Kardinia Park in Geelong, instead of their regular home ground, the Melbourne Rectangular Stadium in Melbourne.)
25 November 2026
19:15 UTC+7

Persib (Indonesia)	v	(South Korea) FC Seoul

Gelora Bandung Lautan Api Stadium, Bandung

2 December 2026
17:00 UTC+7

Thể Công–Viettel (Vietnam)	v	(Indonesia) Persib

Hàng Đẫy Stadium, Hanoi
2 December 2026
19:00 UTC+9

FC Seoul (South Korea)	v	(Australia) Melbourne Victory

Seoul World Cup Stadium, Seoul

==== Group F ====
Pos	Team	Pld	W	D	L	GF	GA	GD	Pts	Qualification	LCS	BGP	ADE	TPF
1	(Singapore) Lion City Sailors	4	3	1	0	9	1	+8	10	Advance to round of 16	—	1–1	5–0	–
2	(Thailand) BG Pathum United	4	2	1	1	9	4	+5	7	Advance to round of 16	–	—	1–2	4–1
3	(Australia) Adelaide United	4	2	0	2	5	8	−3	6		0–2	–	—	3–0
4	(Hong Kong) Tai Po (E)	4	0	0	4	1	11	−10	0		0–1	0–3	–	—

Updated to match(es) played on 5 November 2026. Source: ACL2
Rules for classification: Tiebreakers
(E) Eliminated
17 September 2026
18:00 UTC+8

Lion City Sailors (Singapore)	1–1	(Thailand) BG Pathum United
Nikolić 25' (o.g.)	Report	Gustavsson 51'

Jalan Besar Stadium, Singapore
Attendance: 1,853
Referee: Resul Mämmedow (Turkmenistan)
17 September 2026
19:30 UTC+9:30

Adelaide United (Australia)	3–0	(Hong Kong) Tai Po
Alagich 19'; Muñiz 48'; Goodwin 75'	Report

Hindmarsh Stadium, Adelaide
Attendance: 3,417
Referee: Ammar Mahfoodh (Bahrain)

15 October 2026
18:00 UTC+8

Tai Po (Hong Kong)	0–1	(Singapore) Lion City Sailors
	Report	Phaëton 48'

Mong Kok Stadium, Hong Kong
Attendance: 976
Referee: Chae Sang-hyeop (South Korea)
15 October 2026
19:15 UTC+7

BG Pathum United (Thailand)	1–2	(Australia) Adelaide United
Jurina 2'	Report	Goodwin 10'; Alagich 77'

True BG Stadium, Pathum Thani
Attendance: 4,317
Referee: Mohammed Al-Shammari (Qatar)

29 October 2026
18:15 UTC+10:30

Adelaide United (Australia)	0–2	(Singapore) Lion City Sailors
	Report	Gomes 80'; L. Thy 90+3'

Hindmarsh Stadium, Adelaide
Attendance: 3,762
Referee: Clifford Daypuyat (Philippines)
29 October 2026
20:15 UTC+8

Tai Po (Hong Kong)	0–3	(Thailand) BG Pathum United
	Report	Belmonte 27'; Rama 32'; Ratthasat 42'

Mong Kok Stadium, Hong Kong
Attendance: 1,502
Referee: Meder Tayçiev (Kyrgyzstan)

5 November 2026
19:30 UTC+8

Lion City Sailors (Singapore)	5–0	(Australia) Adelaide United
Phaëton 8', 75'; Wright 17'; Nakamura 41'; Fandi 71'	Report

Jalan Besar Stadium, Singapore
Attendance: 1,847
Referee: Sanzhar Zhakypbekov (Kyrgyzstan)
5 November 2026
19:15 UTC+7

BG Pathum United (Thailand)	4–1	(Hong Kong) Tai Po
Jurina 14', 37', 57'; M. Costa 63'	Report	Wallisson 70'

True BG Stadium, Pathum Thani
Attendance: 4,963
Referee: Baraa Aisha (Palestine)

26 November 2026
19:15 UTC+7

BG Pathum United (Thailand)	v	(Singapore) Lion City Sailors

True BG Stadium, Pathum Thani
26 November 2026
20:15 UTC+8

Tai Po (Hong Kong)	v	(Australia) Adelaide United

Mong Kok Stadium, Hong Kong

3 December 2026
18:00 UTC+8

Lion City Sailors (Singapore)	v	(Hong Kong) Tai Po

Jalan Besar Stadium, Singapore
3 December 2026
20:30 UTC+10:30

Adelaide United (Australia)	v	(Thailand) BG Pathum United

Hindmarsh Stadium, Adelaide

==== Group G ====
Pos	Team	Pld	W	D	L	GF	GA	GD	Pts	Qualification	MCZ	PKR	SHS	TAM
1	(Japan) Machida Zelvia (A)	4	4	0	0	6	1	+5	12	Advance to round of 16	—	2–0	2–1	–
2	(Cambodia) PKR Svay Rieng	4	2	1	1	7	3	+4	7	Advance to round of 16	–	—	0–0	2–0
3	(China) Shanghai Shenhua	4	1	1	2	3	4	−1	4		0–1	–	—	2–1
4	(Singapore) Tampines Rovers (E)	4	0	0	4	2	10	−8	0		0–1	1–5	–	—

Updated to match(es) played on 5 November 2026. Source: ACL2
Rules for classification: Tiebreakers
(A) Advance to a further round; (E) Eliminated
17 September 2026
19:00 UTC+9

Machida Zelvia (Japan)	2–0	(Cambodia) PKR Svay Rieng
Duke 21'; Yengi 60'	Report

Machida GION Stadium, Machida
Attendance: 2,753
Referee: Ammar Abo Alo (Syria)
17 September 2026
20:15 UTC+8

Shanghai Shenhua (China)	2–1	(Singapore) Tampines Rovers
Xu Haoyang 19'; Yang Shuai 62'	Report	F. Ramli 33'

Shanghai Stadium, Shanghai
Attendance: 24,024
Referee: Mooud Bonyadifard (Iran)

15 October 2026
19:15 UTC+7

PKR Svay Rieng (Cambodia)	0–0	(China) Shanghai Shenhua
	Report

Morodok Techo National Stadium, Phnom Penh (Note: Svay Rieng played their home match at the Morodok Techo National Stadium in Phnom Penh, instead of their regular home ground, the Svay Rieng Stadium in Svay Rieng, which was undergoing major renovations.)
Attendance: 6,274
Referee: Ali Al Ashkar (Lebanon)
15 October 2026
20:15 UTC+8

Tampines Rovers (Singapore)	0–1	(Japan) Machida Zelvia
	Report	Mochizuki 90+4'

Jalan Besar Stadium, Singapore (Note: Tampines Rovers played their home match at the Jalan Besar Stadium in Singapore, instead of their regular home ground, the Our Tampines Hub in Singapore, which did not meet AFC requirements.)
Attendance: 947
Referee: Hussain Al-Showaikh (Bahrain)

29 October 2026
18:00 UTC+8

Tampines Rovers (Singapore)	1–5	(Cambodia) PKR Svay Rieng
R. Suhaimi 90'	Report	M. Júnior 9'; Alves 15', 24'; Peprah 42'; Ibeh 69'

Jalan Besar Stadium, Singapore
Attendance: 573
Referee: Yahya Al-Mulla (United Arab Emirates)
29 October 2026
20:15 UTC+8

Shanghai Shenhua (China)	0–1	(Japan) Machida Zelvia
	Report	Shirasaki 28'

Shanghai Stadium, Shanghai
Attendance: 20,698
Referee: Payam Heydari (Iran)

5 November 2026
19:00 UTC+9

Machida Zelvia (Japan)	2–1	(China) Shanghai Shenhua
Shimoda 29'; Sento 78'	Report	Ratão 59'

Machida GION Stadium, Machida
Attendance: 3,474
Referee: Qasim Al-Hatmi (Oman)
5 November 2026
19:15 UTC+7

PKR Svay Rieng (Cambodia)	2–0	(Singapore) Tampines Rovers
Alves 32'; Tartarotti 78'	Report

Morodok Techo National Stadium, Phnom Penh
Attendance: 4,669
Referee: Sami Al-Ismail (Saudi Arabia)

26 November 2026
18:00 UTC+8

Tampines Rovers (Singapore)	v	(China) Shanghai Shenhua

Jalan Besar Stadium, Singapore
26 November 2026
19:15 UTC+7

PKR Svay Rieng (Cambodia)	v	(Japan) Machida Zelvia

Morodok Techo National Stadium, Phnom Penh

3 December 2026
19:00 UTC+9

Machida Zelvia (Japan)	v	(Singapore) Tampines Rovers

Machida GION Stadium, Machida
3 December 2026
18:00 UTC+8

Shanghai Shenhua (China)	v	(Cambodia) PKR Svay Rieng

Kunshan Olympic Sports Centre Stadium, Kunshan

==== Group H ====
Pos	Team	Pld	W	D	L	GF	GA	GD	Pts	Qualification	PPC	KIT	KUC	GWN
1	(Cambodia) Phnom Penh Crown	4	3	0	1	7	4	+3	9	Advance to round of 16	—	2–0	2–1	–
2	(Hong Kong) Kitchee	4	1	2	1	3	4	−1	5	Advance to round of 16	2–1	—	–	0–0
3	(Malaysia) Kuching City	4	1	1	2	4	4	0	4		–	1–1	—	2–0
4	(South Korea) Gangwon FC	4	1	1	2	2	4	−2	4		1–2	–	1–0	—

Updated to match(es) played on 5 November 2026. Source: ACL2
Rules for classification: Tiebreakers
17 September 2026
20:15 UTC+8

Kitchee (Hong Kong)	0–0	(South Korea) Gangwon FC
	Report

Mong Kok Stadium, Hong Kong
Attendance: 2,899
Referee: Ahmad Yacoub Ibrahim (Jordan)
17 September 2026
19:15 UTC+7

Phnom Penh Crown (Cambodia)	2–1	(Malaysia) Kuching City
Dyer 55', 90+1'	Report	Mujagić 73'

Morodok Techo National Stadium, Phnom Penh (Note: Phnom Penh Crown played their home match at the Morodok Techo National Stadium in Phnom Penh, instead of their regular home ground, the Phnom Penh Crown Stadium in Phnom Penh, which did not meet AFC requirements.)
Attendance: 6,378
Referee: Baraa Aisha (Palestine)

15 October 2026
19:00 UTC+9

Gangwon FC (South Korea)	1–2	(Cambodia) Phnom Penh Crown
Hleihel 61' (pen.)	Report	Mijland 44'; Dyer 78' (pen.)

Gangneung HIGH1 ARENA, Gangneung
Attendance: 2,207
Referee: Zaid Thamer Mohammed (Iraq)
15 October 2026
20:15 UTC+8

Kuching City (Malaysia)	1–1	(Hong Kong) Kitchee
Pong 2' (o.g.)	Report	Camargo 14'

Taha Ariffin Stadium, Kuching
Attendance: 5,545
Referee: Ahmed Kadhim Gatea (Iraq)

29 October 2026
19:00 UTC+9

Gangwon FC (South Korea)	1–0	(Malaysia) Kuching City
Choe Byeong-chan 28'	Report

Gangneung HIGH1 ARENA, Gangneung
Attendance: 1,517
Referee: Du Jianxin (China)
29 October 2026
19:15 UTC+7

Phnom Penh Crown (Cambodia)	2–0	(Hong Kong) Kitchee
Ty 89'; Bareš 90+3'	Report

Morodok Techo National Stadium, Phnom Penh
Attendance: 3,948
Referee: Naufal Adya Fairuski (Indonesia)

5 November 2026
18:00 UTC+8

Kitchee (Hong Kong)	2–1	(Cambodia) Phnom Penh Crown
Mingazow 2'; Kendy 90+1'	Report	Mijland 86'

Mong Kok Stadium, Hong Kong
Attendance: 1,542
Referee: Wiwat Jumpaoon (Thailand)
5 November 2026
20:15 UTC+8

Kuching City (Malaysia)	2–0	(South Korea) Gangwon FC
Safawi 13', 20'	Report

Taha Ariffin Stadium, Kuching
Attendance: 3,216
Referee: Mahmoud Al-Sawalmeh (Jordan)

26 November 2026
19:00 UTC+9

Gangwon FC (South Korea)	v	(Hong Kong) Kitchee

Gangneung HIGH1 ARENA, Gangneung
26 November 2026
18:00 UTC+8

Kuching City (Malaysia)	v	(Cambodia) Phnom Penh Crown

Taha Ariffin Stadium, Kuching

3 December 2026
20:15 UTC+8

Kitchee (Hong Kong)	v	(Malaysia) Kuching City

Mong Kok Stadium, Hong Kong
3 December 2026
19:15 UTC+7

Phnom Penh Crown (Cambodia)	v	(South Korea) Gangwon FC

Morodok Techo National Stadium, Phnom Penh

== See also ==
- 2026–27 AFC Champions League Elite league stage
- 2026–27 AFC Challenge League group stage
