= Aba Annaýew, Kärizek =

Aba Annaýew Aba Annaýew şäherçesi
- Town
- Location in Turkmenistan
- Coordinates: 38°02′47″N 58°02′06″E
- Country: Turkmenistan
- Province: Ahal Province
- City: Arkadag
- Borough: Kärizek District
- Establishment: 8 November 2014
- Township: 10 May 2023
- Time zone: UTC+5

Aba Annaýew, previously known as Çüli (in Russian: Чули) then Gökdere, is a town within the city of Arkadag, Ahal Province, Turkmenistan.

== Etymology ==
The town was named after Aba Annaýew, great-uncle of former president Gurbanguly Berdimuhamedow and, officially, an important figure of equestrian arts in Turkmenistan.

The village was briefly named Gökdere, which in Turkmen is a compound of two words: "Gök" and "Dere," which mean "Blue" and "Valley" or "Stream" respectively.

== History ==
Under Russian and Soviet rule, before the township was established, the village of Çüli was the seat of an uchastok, a police prefecture. After the independence of Turkmenistan, it was listed as a village.

As of 15 August 2009, the village of Çüli was renamed Gökdere. On 27 April 2014, the construction of a new equestrian facility started in the presence of President Berdimuhamedow. On 8 November 2014, the village of Aba Annaýew was established within the Rural Council of Gorjaw. On 12 January 2016, the rural council of Kärizek was established and Aba Annaýew was used as its seat. Between 2017 and 2018, the settlement located where lay Gökdere was completely destroyed and rebuilt.

As the construction of Arkadag started in 2022, less than a kilometer away, the village was briefly abolished on 20 December 2022 and transferred from Gökdepe District to Arkadag. It was re-established as a town and seat of Kärizek District on 10 May 2023. The town consists of 57 houses housing 114 families.

== Reactions ==
In 2016, as the new equestrian facility was inaugurated, RFL/RL, about the name of the new settlement, questions: "Does anyone know anything about Aba Annaýew and his contribution to equestrian disciplines?" Geldi Kärizow, former head of the Turkmenistan Equestrian State Association, notes there are "more worthy jockeys" than Aba Annaýew.

On the other hand, Turkmen medias, state-owned, highlighted foreign medias' good reactions to "modern infrastructures" and "excellent living conditions for residents."

== See also ==
- Aba Annaýew
- List of municipalities in Ahal Province
- Towns of Turkmenistan
