= International Equestrian Sports Complex =

Largest horse racing hippodrome in Turkmenistan

Coordinates: 38°02′43″N 58°02′34″E

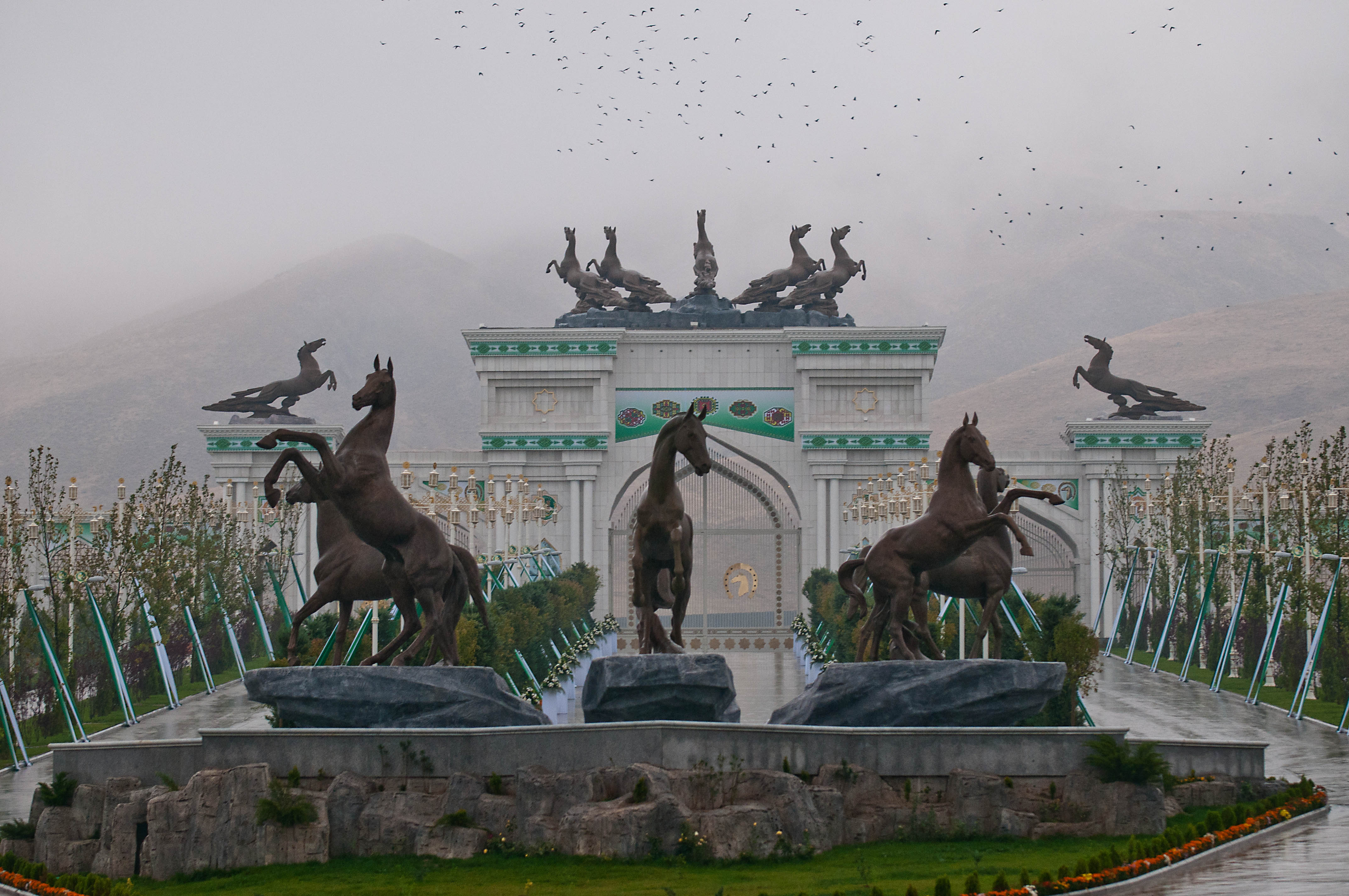
- Location: Arkadag, Turkmenistan
- Date opened: 2011
- Race type: Akhal-Teke - Flat racing
- Notable races: Turkmenistan Championship

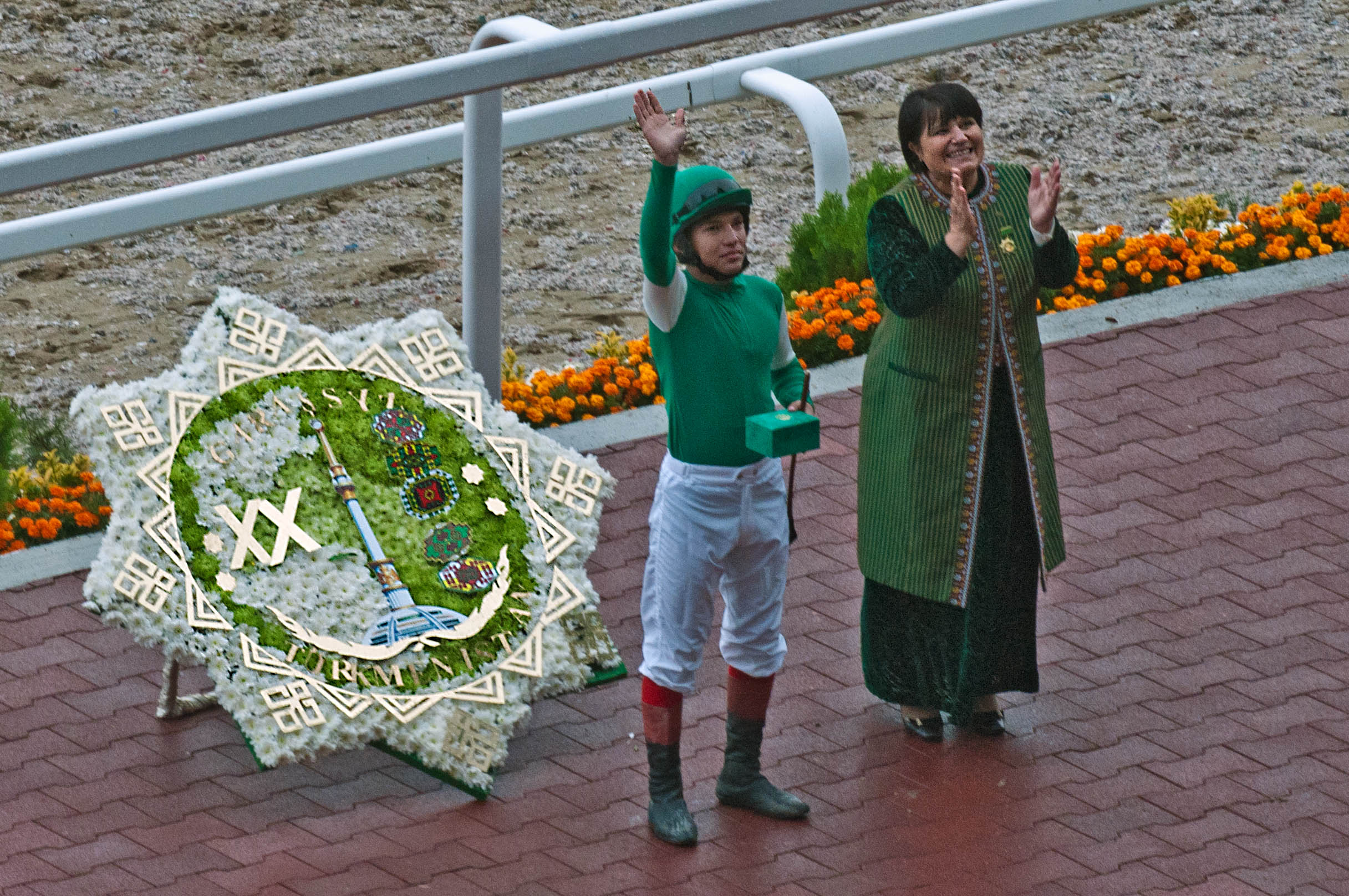
Opening of International Equestrian Sports Complex by Akja Nurberdiýewa in 2011

The International Equestrian Sports Complex (Turkmen: Halkara atçylyk sport toplumy) is the largest horse racing hippodrome in Turkmenistan. The total area of the complex is 90 hectares. The complex was opened on 29 October 2011, at a cost of US$106,800,000. The hippodrome was constructed by the Turkish company Etkin.

The circuit allows both jumps and races to take place. It is located in Arkadag on Kopetdag Avenue, situated near the National Museum of Wildlife of Turkmenistan. It has stables for 600 horses. Along with the race track and stables, there are also 57 two-storied cottages and two family houses for 114 owners, kindergarten for 160 children, 2 markets, a playground and sports fields, as well as a social-cultural center.

With the completion of the development of the equestrian village in April 2016, the International Equestrian Sports Complex has been renamed the International Akhalteke Equestrian Complex.

== History ==
The facility was constructed within two years and was officially inaugurated in honor of Turkmenistan's Independence Day on October 29, 2011.

== Overview ==
The primary race track spans 2,000 meters, while the smaller track measures 1,800 meters. Additionally, there is a grass track of 1,900 meters and a concrete track of 1,800 meters.

The spectator grandstands have a capacity of 7,000 people. On the first floor beneath the stands, there are utility, administrative, and office spaces. The second floor houses viewing boxes and a café serving traditional Turkmen cuisine. The third floor features a hotel with 52 rooms and a CIP grandstand. The fourth floor is reserved for the VIP grandstand. The complex also includes a restaurant, guest yurts, open-air cafeterias, and an amphitheater.

Near the spectator grandstands is a circus building with 500 seats, hosting equestrian performances. Additionally, there is a facility for equestrian games with a seating capacity of 800, which includes both open-air and indoor show-jumping arenas.

The complex includes 10 stables, 5 houses for jockeys and grooms, a quarantine facility for 20 horses, a laboratory, a training pool for horses, and a preparation facility for races that can accommodate 80 horses. Additionally, there is a garage for equipment, a workshop, a forge, and storage barns for hay and concentrated feed.
