= Dian Wirengjurit =

Indonesian diplomat (born 1957)

Ambassador of Indonesia to Iran and Turkmenistan
- In office 21 December 2011 – 2015
- President: Susilo Bambang Yudhoyono; Joko Widodo
- Preceded by: Iwan Wiranataatmadja
- Succeeded by: Octavino Alimudin

Personal details
- Born: May 8, 1957 (age 69) Bandung, West Java, Indonesia
- Education: University of Indonesia (Drs.)
- Occupation: Diplomat

Dian Wirengjurit (born 8 May 1957) is a retired Indonesian diplomat who last served as Indonesia's ambassador to Iran and Turkmenistan, with residence in Tehran, from 2012 to 2016. Prior to his ambassadorial posting, Dian was the deputy chief of mission at the embassy in Moscow and director of America and Europe interregional cooperation.

== Early life and education ==
Born on 8 May 1957, in Bandung, West Java, Wirengjurit was raised in a Muslim family. He completed his higher education in political science at the University of Indonesia in 1984. He then entered the foreign ministry in March 1985 and completed basic diplomatic education the next year.

== Diplomatic career ==
Dian's diplomatic career began in 1986 as a staff member at the Research and Development Center for Economic, Social, and Cultural Foreign Relations. Following this four-year tenure, he received his first major international assignment as a staff within the 1st Political Section for the permanent mission in New York from 1990 to 1994. Upon his return to Jakarta, he served as staff to Nana Sutresna, the chief of the executive agency of the Non-Aligned Movement for a year, before being appointed the chief of ideology affairs section at the Directorate of International Organizations from 1995 to 1997. He completed his mid-level diplomatic education in 1997 before being posted to the permanent mission in Geneva as the head of Political Sub-section I between 1997 and 2001. After a brief return to Indonesia to serve as the Head of Administration for the Directorate of Europe from 2001 to 2002 and subsequently the deputy director (chief of subdirectorate) for Intra-Regional Cooperation from 2002 to 2003, he returned to Geneva to serve as the chief of political affairs at the mission from 2003 to 2007. A year prior, in 2002, he completed his senior diplomatic education. In 2007, he was promoted to leadership role as the director of America and Europe interregional cooperation. During his tenure, Dian was involved in organizing Indonesia's presence at the Asia–Europe Meeting summits and handled Indonesia's presence on the European Union flight ban list.

In late 2010, Dian took up office as deputy chief of mission at the embassy in Moscow, serving under ambassador Hamid Awaluddin. Following Hamid's departure in 2011, Dian became the embassy's chargé d'affaires ad interim. During his ad interim tenure, there were reports of the embassy charging unlicensed administration fees for Indonesian students, which was denied by Dian. Dian accused the student of slander and stated that the student had previously committed fait accompli on him by using a fake letter header to obtain job recommendation from the embassy.

Dian was nominated by president Susilo Bambang Yudhoyono as Indonesia's ambassador to Iran and Turkmenistan. He passed an assessment conducted by the House of Representative's first commission in August 2011. Dianwas sworn in on 21 December 2011 and presented his letters of credence to president of Iran Mahmoud Ahmadinejad on 18 March 2012. Ahmadinejad expressed his hope for an "all-out" bilateral relations within all sectors. Several months later, on 13 July 2012 Dian presented his credentials to the Chairman of the Assembly of Turkmenistan Akja Nurberdiýewa on 13 July 2012, with similar discussions regarding bilateral cooperation. In a lecture at the Qeshm Island in September 2012, Dian acknowledged misunderstanding as an impetus to deepen relations between the two nations, admitting that he envisioned Iran as an isolated and backward nation prior to his posting there.

Regarding international sanctions against Iran during his ambassadorial tenure, Dian stated that Indonesia would not comply and would continue to cooperate with Iran in all fields. In a meeting with Indonesian businesspeople in 2014, Dian urged investors to fill in the market gaps left by Western trading partners.

As ambassador, Dian introduced Indonesia through cultural diplomacy, such as holding an Indonesian cultural festival in 2013, and photo exhibitions. His first exhibition was organized in collaboration with the Bosnian ambassador Emir Hadikadunic in 2013, while his second one involved Iranian photographer Frieda Saedi in 2014. On 11 June 2015, Dian launched a photobook titled Iran: Lovely People, which documents rural life in Iran. For his efforts in cultural diplomacy, Dian received an award from the Iran Culture and Relations Organization at the end of his term on 16 August 2015.

After he concluded his term as ambassador, in August 2021 Dian was nominated as secretary general of the Colombo Plan.
