= Yūta Nakayama =

Japanese footballer (born 1997)

Yūta Nakayama 中山 雄太
Personal information
- Full name: Yūta Nakayama
- Date of birth: 16 February 1997 (age 29)
- Place of birth: Ryūgasaki, Ibaraki, Japan
- Height: 1.81 m (5 ft 11 in)
- Positions: Centre back; left back; defensive midfielder

Team information
- Current team: Red Star Belgrade
- Number: 3

Youth career
- 2003–2008: Kitamonma SSS
- 2009–2010: Atago Junior High School
- 2011–2014: Kashiwa Reysol

Senior career*
Years	Team	Apps	(Gls)
2015–2018	Kashiwa Reysol	76	(6)
2015	→ J. League U-22 (loan)	12	(0)
2019–2022	PEC Zwolle	79	(5)
2022–2024	Huddersfield Town	37	(2)
2024–2026	Machida Zelvia	58	(5)
2026–	Red Star Belgrade	8	(0)

International career^{‡}
2015–2017	Japan U-20	30	(0)
2018–2021	Japan U-23	18	(4)
2019–2024	Japan	22	(0)
Medal record
Representing Japan
AFC U-19 Championship
Gold medal – first place	2016 Bahrain
- * Club domestic league appearances and goals as of 21 November 2026 ‡ National team caps and goals as of 31 January 2024

Yūta Nakayama (中山 雄太, Nakayama Yūta; born 16 February 1997) is a Japanese professional footballer who plays for Serbian SuperLiga club Red Star Belgrade. He can play centre back, left back, or defensive midfielder.

== Club career ==
=== Early club career in Japan ===
Nakayama was born in Ibaraki, Japan. He made his official debut for Kashiwa Reysol in the J. League Division 1, AFC Champions League on 6 May 2015 against the Vietnamese Binh Duong F.C in Go Dau Stadium in Thu Dau Mot, Vietnam. He started and played the full match, receiving a yellow card in the 83rd minute. Nakayama and his club lost the match 1–0. In 2017, Nakayama was named J.League Rookie of the Year.

=== Playing abroad ===
On 15 January 2019, Nakayama joined Eredivisie team PEC Zwolle on a three-and-a-half–year contract. The same year on 31 March, he made his league debut with the club in a 3–0 home victory against FC Emmen. The following year, on 17 January 2020, Nakayama scored his first goal with PEC Zwolle in a 3–3 draw against Utrecht.

On 15 July 2022, following PEC Zwolle's relegation from the Eredivisie, Nakayama joined EFL Championship club Huddersfield Town on a two-year deal. He scored his first league goal in his third appearance for Huddersfield, a 3–1 victory against Stoke City on 13 August of the same year.

On 14 August 2024, Nakayama was announced at Machida Zelvia. On 24 August, he returned to play abroad, signing for Serbian Superliga club Red Star Belgrade.

== International career ==
In May 2017, Nakayama was elected Japan U-20 national team for 2017 U-20 World Cup. At this tournament, he played full time in all four matches as center-back. On 17 June 2019, Nakayama debuted for the Japan national team as a starter in a 2019 Copa América match against Chile. He was selected for the 2022 FIFA World Cup, but forced to withdraw from the official squad list due to an achilles injury.

== Career statistics ==
=== Club ===
As of match played 15 October 2026

Appearances and goals by club, season and competition
Club	Season	League			National cup		League cup		Continental		Other		Total	
Club	Season	Division	Apps	Goals	Apps	Goals	Apps	Goals	Apps	Goals	Apps	Goals	Apps	Goals
Kashiwa Reysol	2015	J1 League	1	0	0	0	1	0	2 (Note: Appearances in AFC Champions League Elite)	0	—		4	0
Kashiwa Reysol	2016	J1 League	26	2	2	0	4	0	—		—		32	2
Kashiwa Reysol	2017	J1 League	30	1	4	0	4	0	—		—		38	1
Kashiwa Reysol	2018	J1 League	19	3	0	0	2	0	4	0	—		25	3
Kashiwa Reysol	Total		76	6	6	0	11	0	6	0	0	0	99	6
J.League U-22 Selection (loan)	2015	J3 League	12	0	—		—		—		—		12	0
PEC Zwolle	2018–19	Eredivisie	4	0	0	0	—		—		—		4	0
PEC Zwolle	2019–20	Eredivisie	14	2	1	0	—		—		—		15	2
PEC Zwolle	2020–21	Eredivisie	32	2	1	0	—		—		—		33	2
PEC Zwolle	2021–22	Eredivisie	29	1	3	1	—		—		—		32	2
PEC Zwolle	Total		79	5	5	1	0	0	0	0	0	0	84	6
Huddersfield Town	2022–23	Championship	14	2	0	0	1	0	—		—		15	2
Huddersfield Town	2023–24	Championship	23	0	0	0	1	0	—		—		24	0
Huddersfield Town	Total		37	2	0	0	2	0	—		—		39	2
Machida Zelvia	2024	J1 League	6	1	0	0	0	0	—		—		6	1
Machida Zelvia	2025	J1 League	32	1	5	0	1	0	6	0	—		44	1
Machida Zelvia	2026	J1 (100)	17	2	0	0	0	0	7	0	—		24	2
Machida Zelvia	2026–27	J1 League	3	1	0	0	0	0	0	0	—		3	1
Machida Zelvia	Total		58	5	5	0	1	0	13	0	—		77	5
Red Star Belgrade	2026–27	Serbian SuperLiga	5	0	0	0	—		1 (Note: Appearances in UEFA Conference League)	0	—		6	0
Career total			262	18	16	1	21	0	13	0	0	0	312	19

=== International ===
As of match played 31 January 2024

National team	Year	Apps	Goals
Japan	2019	1	0
Japan	2020	4	0
Japan	2021	4	0
Japan	2022	8	0
Japan	2023	3	0
Japan	2024	2	0
Total		22	0

== Honors ==
- Machida Zelvia: 2025 Emperor's Cup
