= Nicholas Guimarães =

Filipino footballer (born 2006)

Personal information
- Full name: Nicholas Rodriguez Guimarães
- Date of birth: 9 August 2006 (age 20)
- Place of birth: Narashino, Japan
- Height: 1.83 m (6 ft 0 in)
- Position: Goalkeeper

Team information
- Current team: Machida Zelvia
- Number: 89

Youth career
- –2024: Funabashi Municipal High School

College career
Years	Team	Apps	(Gls)
2025–	Juntendo University		

Senior career*
Years	Team	Apps	(Gls)
–2026	Ichikawa SC		
2026–	Machida Zelvia	0	(0)

International career^{‡}
2022	Philippines U17	4	(0)
2025–	Philippines U22	4	(0)
2025–	Philippines U23	11	(0)
- * Club domestic league appearances and goals as of 8 December 2025 ‡ National team caps and goals as of 22 September 2026

Nicholas Rodriguez Guimarães (Japanese: ギマラエス ニコラス; born 9 August 2006) is a professional footballer who plays as a goalkeeper for J1 League club Machida Zelvia. Born in Japan, he represents the Philippines internationally.

== Early life ==
Guimarães was born on 9 August 2006 in Narashino, Japan to a Brazilian father and a Filipina mother and is the twin brother of Filipino footballer Gabriel Guimarães. At the age of two, he started playing football.

Growing up, he attended Funabashi Municipal High School in Japan. Following his stint there, he attended Juntendo University in Japan.

== Club career ==
While still in university, he also played football for Ichikawa SC alongside his brother. In July 2026, J1 League side Machida Zelvia announced the acquisition of Guimarães on a permanent transfer, signing a contract at only 19 years old.

== International career ==
Guimarães is a Philippines youth international. During the summer of 2025, he played for the Philippines national under-23 football team at the 2025 ASEAN U-23 Championship. The same year, he played for the Philippines national under-22 football team at the 2025 SEA Games.

== Career statistics ==
As of match played 5 November 2026

Appearances and goals by club, season and competition
Club	Season	League			Emperor's Cup		AFC Champions League Two		Total	
Club	Season	Division	Apps	Goals	Apps	Goals	Apps	Goals	Apps	Goals
Ichikawa SC	2025	—			—		—		—	
Machida Zelvia	2026–27	J1 League	0	0	0	0	0	0	0	0
Career total			0	0	0	0	0	0	0	0
