= Ahmad Assaf =

Jordanian footballer born in 1999

Personal information
- Full name: Ahmad Assaf
- Date of birth: 21 July 1999 (age 27)
- Place of birth: Munich, Germany
- Height: 1.75 m (5 ft 9 in)
- Position: Right-back

Team information
- Current team: Al-Hussein
- Number: 66

Senior career*
Years	Team	Apps	(Gls)
2019–2020	SpVgg Landshut		
2020	Mladost		
2020–2021	VfB Eichstätt		
2021–2022	FC Eilenburg	18	(0)
2022–2023	Türkgücü München	5	(0)
2023	Zvijezda Gradačac	13	(0)
2024–2025	Bremer SV	8	(0)
2025	US Rumelange	7	(0)
2025–	Al-Hussein	15	(0)

International career^{‡}
	Jordan U23	2	(0)
2025–	Jordan	2	(0)
- * Club domestic league appearances and goals as of 8 May 2026 ‡ National team caps and goals as of 16 July 2025

Ahmad Assaf (Arabic: أحمد عساف; born 21 July 1999) is a professional footballer who plays as a full-back for Jordanian Pro League club Al-Hussein. Born in Germany, he plays for the Jordan national team.

== Club career ==
=== FC Eilenburg ===
On 27 August 2021, Assaf joined FC Eilenburg.

=== Türkgücü München ===
On 11 July 2022, Assaf joined Regionalliga side Türkgücü München from FC Eilenburg.

== International career ==
Assaf was noted for making two appearances with the Jordan national under-23 football team.

Assaf received his first senior call-up to the Jordan national football team on 10 January 2025, for a set of training camps in Amman and Doha. He made his unofficial debut for the senior team against Uzbekistan.

On 8 March 2025, Assaf received another call up to the Jordan national football team for the 2026 FIFA World Cup qualification matches against Palestine and South Korea.
