= Kärizek District =

Borough of City of Arkadag, Turkmenistan

Kärizek District Kärizek etraby
- District
- Interactive map of Kärizek District
- Coordinates: 38°03′16″N 58°05′39″E
- Country: Turkmenistan
- Region: Arkadag
- Established: 18.03.2023
- Seat: Aba Annaýew

Government
  - häkim: Mekan Doglotov
- Time zone: UTC+5 (+5)

Kärizek District (Turkmen: Kärizek etraby) is a borough of the city of Arkadag, Turkmenistan. The borough is headed by a presidentially appointed mayor (Turkmen: häkim).

== History ==
Kärizek Borough formed on 18 March 2023, in accordance with a decree of the Assembly of Turkmenistan. On 11 April 2023, Mekan Doglotov was appointed mayor of Kärizek Borough.

In May 2023 the Turkmenistan parliament designated the community of Aba Annaýew, constructed to house equestrians and support staff for the nearby hippodrome, a town, subordinate to the city of Arkadag and part of Kärizek Borough.
