= Anton Burns =

American soccer player (born 2003)

Anton Burns アントン・バーンズ
Personal information
- Full name: Anton Burns
- Date of birth: October 1, 2003 (age 23)
- Place of birth: Los Angeles, California, United States
- Height: 1.87 m (6 ft 1 1/2 in)
- Position: Goalkeeper

Team information
- Current team: Gainare Tottori (on loan from FC Machida Zelvia)
- Number: 88

Youth career
- K4SC
- –2018: Tripletta Jr. Youth
- 2019–2021: Taisei High School

Senior career*
Years	Team	Apps	(Gls)
2022–	Machida Zelvia	0	(0)
2025–2026	→ Roasso Kumamoto (loan)	0	(0)
2026–	→ Gainare Tottori (loan)	5	(0)
- * Club domestic league appearances and goals as of August 24, 2026

Anton Burns (バーンズ アントン, Bānzu Anton; born October 1, 2003) is an American soccer player who plays as a goalkeeper for J3 League club Gainare Tottori, on loan from J1 League club FC Machida Zelvia.

== Club career ==
He encountered soccer in the second grade of elementary school and became a goalkeeper starting in sixth grade.

While attending Taisei High School, he began regularly participating in Machida Zelvia training sessions starting late 2020. In February 2021, it was announced he had secured a provisional contract to join Machida for the 2022 season and received special designated player approval.

For the 2025 season, he was urgently loaned on a developmental loan to Roasso Kumamoto, which had suffered a series of injuries to its goalkeepers, but did not see any playing time.

For the 2026 season, he was loaned to Gainare Tottori on a temporary transfer.

== International career ==
Born in Los Angeles in the United States, Burns was eligible to represent the US national team and the Japan national team.

Burns has trained with Japan's under-18 and under-19 youth national teams but has never made an appearance.

== Personal life ==
Burns was born in the United States to an American father and Japanese mother, and moved to Japan at an early age. He has dual citizenship.

== Career statistics ==
=== Club ===
As of match played February 7, 2026

Appearances and goals by club, season and competition
Club	Season	League			Cup		Europe		Other		Total	
Club	Season	League	Apps	Goals	Apps	Goals	Apps	Goals	Apps	Goals	Apps	Goals
Gainare Tottori	2025–26	J3 League	1	0	—		—		—		1	0
Career total			1	0	0	0	0	0	0	0	1	0

== Honors ==
Machida Zelvia

- J2 League: 2023
