= Gurbannazar Ezizow =

Turkmen poet

- Ezizow
- Born: 1 March 1940; Büzmeýin, Turkmen SSR, USSR (now Turkmenistan)
- Died: 20 September 1975 (aged 35); Gazanjyk, Turkmen SSR, USSR (now Turkmenistan)
- Occupation: Poet

Gurbannazar Ezizov or Gurbannazar Ezizow (1 March 1940 – 20 September 1975) was a Turkmen poet and winner of the Magtymguly State Prize of Turkmenistan.

== Biography ==
Gurbannazar Ezizow was born on 1 March 1940 in Büzmeýin. He began attending school in 1948 and graduated from School No. 29 in Ashkhabad in 1959. In that same year he entered the Faculty of Philology of Turkmen State University. He graduated from the university in 1964 and was assigned to the editorial board of the United Children's Literature Publishing House. That same year he was called up for military service. Following discharge in 1965, he served as director of the poetry section of Edebiýat we sungat ("Literature and Art") newspaper until 1970. From 1972 to the end of his life he worked as a literary consultant in the Writers' Union of Turkmenistan. Archived poems have also been preserved in Ezizow's own reading.

Gurbannazar Ezizow died, shot dead by a Soviet soldier, on a highway near Gazanjyk on 20 September 1975, following an all-Union meeting of young writers and poets in Turkmenbashy.

== Collaboration with Nury Halmammedov ==
Turkmen composer Nury Halmammedov put Ezizow's poetry to music, most notably in the composition Türkmen sähra ("Turkmen Steppe").

== Personal life ==
Gurbannazar was born into a family of jewelers and was taught the art of jewelry by his father Abdyleziz. That is why amongst Turkmen nation Ezizow is known as “zergär şahyr”, translated as “jeweler poet”. Later on, after the death of his father, his mother Gulnabat kept all the handmade jewelry which is still passing from generation to generation as inheritance.

Ezizow got married in 1966, at the age of 26. He had four daughters (Yazgul, Arzygul, Sahragul, Ogulabat) and a son (Serdar). His wife, Halsoltan, was a housekeeper until her husband died and she had to take care of their daughters and a newborn son.

Ezizow’s mother, Gulnabat, died on April 25, 2017, at the age of 97. His father, Abdyleziz, died shortly after the poet’s death.

Poet’s widow and children are all currently living in Turkmenistan.
