= Kaung Zan Mara =

Japanese footballer (born 2002)

Personal information
- Date of birth: 11 June 2002 (age 24)
- Place of birth: Tokyo, Japan
- Height: 1.90 m (6 ft 3 in)
- Position: Goalkeeper

Team information
- Current team: Vanraure Hachinohe (on loan from Machida Zelvia
- Number: 77

Youth career
- Buddy SC Koto
- –2021: Tokyo Verdy

College career
| Years | Team | Apps | (Gls) |
| 2021–2024 | Sanno University | | |

Senior career*
| Years | Team | Apps | (Gls) |
| 2025– | Machida Zelvia | 0 | (0) |
| 2026– | → Vanraure Hachinohe (loan) | 0 | (0) |
- * Club domestic league appearances and goals

Kaung Zan Mara (Japanese: カウンゼン マラ; Burmese: ကောင်းဇံမြ - အသံထွက်(ကောင်းဇံမရ); born 11 June 2002) is a Japanese professional footballer who plays as a goalkeeper for J2 League club Vanraure Hachinohe, on loan from FC Machida Zelvia.

== Early life ==
Kaung was born on 11 June 2002 in Tokyo, Japan to Rakhine parents, later gaining recognition from the Japanese governments as a stateless refugee. The son of Burmese volleyball player Maung Myat Thu, he is the older brother of Japanese volleyball player Yee Mon Myat. As a goalkeeper, he has regarded Brazil international Ederson and Japanese footballer Park Il-gyu as his football idols.

== Career ==
As a youth player, he joined the youth academy of Buddy SC Koto. Subsequently, he joined the youth academy of Tokyo Verdy. In 2021, he started playing for the Sanno University team. Four years later, he signed for Machida Zelvia.

In June 2026, Kaung joined J2 League club Vanraure Hachinohe on loan ahead of the 2026–27 season.

== Style of play ==
Kaung plays as a goalkeeper. Left-footed, he is known for his height and passing ability.
