= 2026–27 AFC Champions League Two knockout stage =

Knockout stage of Asia's secondary club football tournament

The knockout stage of the 2026–27 AFC Champions League Two is scheduled to be played from 9 February to 15 May 2027. A total of 16 teams will be competing in the knockout stage.

== Qualified teams ==
The following teams have advanced from the group stage.

Region	Group	Winners	Runners-up	Qualified (Position TBD)
West Region	A			
West Region	B			(United Arab Emirates) Al Jazira
West Region	C			(Saudi Arabia) Al Taawoun
West Region	D			(Iraq) Al-Shorta
East Region	E			(Indonesia) Persib
East Region	F			
East Region	G			(Japan) Machida Zelvia
East Region	H			

== Format ==
In the knockout stage, 16 teams will play a single-elimination tournament. Each tie will be played on a home-and-away two-legged basis, except the final which will be played as a single match. Extra time and penalty shoot-out will be used to decide the winners if necessary (Regulations Article 10). The order of matches (home vs away) will be determined at the draw, except for the final. The final venue was pre-determined on a rotation basis, with the match hosted by the team from the East region. The draw for the knockout stage is scheduled to be held on 17 December 2026. Teams from the same group cannot be drawn against each other.

== Schedule ==
The schedule of the competition is as follows.

Stage	Round	Draw date	First leg	Second leg
Knockout stage	Round of 16	17 December 2026	9–10 and 16–17 February 2027	10–11 and 17–18 February 2027
Knockout stage	Quarter-finals	17 December 2026	2–3 and 16–17 March 2027	10–11 and 17–18 March 2027
Knockout stage	Semi-finals	17 December 2026	6 and 13 April 2027	7 and 14 April 2027
Knockout stage	Final	17 December 2026	15 May 2027	

== Bracket ==
Round of 16
East Region
West Region

Quarter-finals

Semi-finals

Final
15 May – TBC

== Round of 16 ==
The first legs will be played between 9 and 10 February, and the second legs between 17 and 18 February 2027.

Team 1	Agg.	Team 2	1st leg	2nd leg

== See also ==
- 2026–27 AFC Champions League Elite knockout stage
- 2026–27 AFC Challenge League knockout stage
