= Takumi Narasaka =

Japanese footballer

Takumi Narasaka 奈良坂 巧
Personal information
- Date of birth: 6 July 2002 (age 24)
- Place of birth: Kanagawa, Japan
- Height: 1.87 m (6 ft 2 in)
- Position: Defender

Team information
- Current team: Giravanz Kitakyushu (on loan from Machida Zelvia)
- Number: 5

Youth career
- Yokohama Sumire SC
- JFC Futuro
- Club Teatro
- 2018–2020: Toko Gakuen High School

Senior career*
Years	Team	Apps	(Gls)
2020–	Machida Zelvia	3	(0)
2023–2024	→ Kamatamare Sanuki (loan)	43	(0)
2026–	→ Giravanz Kitakyushu (loan)	17	(1)
- * Club domestic league appearances and goals as of 24 August 2026

Takumi Narasaka (奈良坂 巧, Narasaka Takumi; born 6 July 2002) is a Japanese footballer currently playing as a defender for J3 League club Giravanz Kitakyushu, on loan from Machida Zelvia.

== Club career ==
Narasaka made his professional debut in a 0–2 Emperor's Cup loss against Tochigi SC.

== Career statistics ==
=== Club ===
As of 25 March 2026.

Appearances and goals by club, season and competition
Club	Season	League			National cup (Note: Includes Emperors Cup)		Total	
Club	Season	Division	Apps	Goals	Apps	Goals	Apps	Goals
FC Machida Zelvia	2021	J2 League	2	0	1	0	3	0
FC Machida Zelvia	2022	J2 League	1	0	0	0	1	0
FC Machida Zelvia	2024	J1 League	0	0	0	0	0	0
FC Machida Zelvia	2025	J1 League	0	0	1	0	1	0
FC Machida Zelvia	Total		3	0	2	0	5	0
Kamatamare Sanuki (loan)	2023	J3 League	33	0	2	0	35	0
Kamatamare Sanuki (loan)	2024	J3 League	10	0	2	0	12	0
Kamatamare Sanuki (loan)	Total		43	0	4	0	47	0
Giravanz Kitakyushu (loan)	2026	J2/J3 (100)	6	0	–		6	0
Career total			52	0	6	0	58	0
