= Arkadag =

Capital of Ahal Province, Turkmenistan

Arkadag Arkadag şäheri
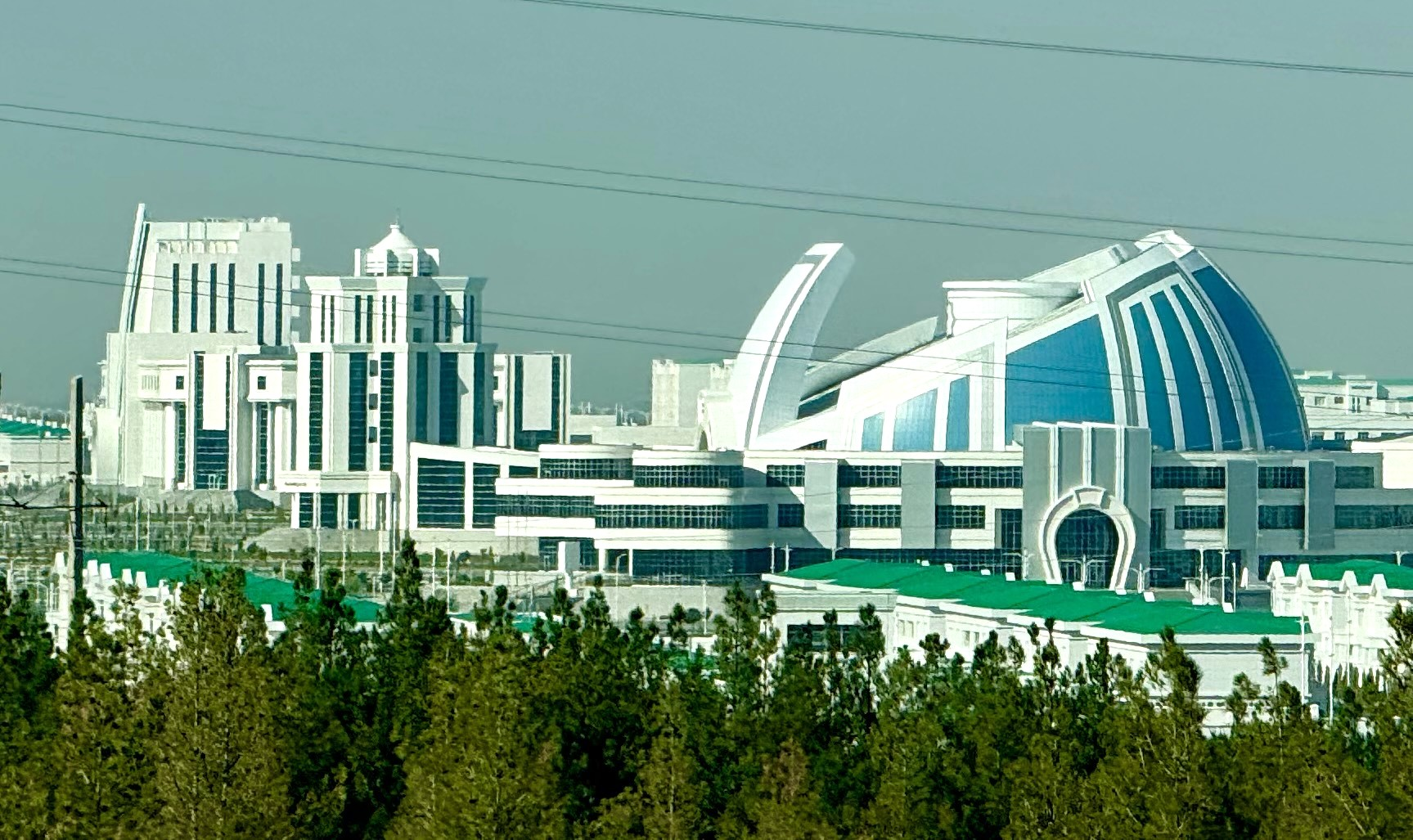
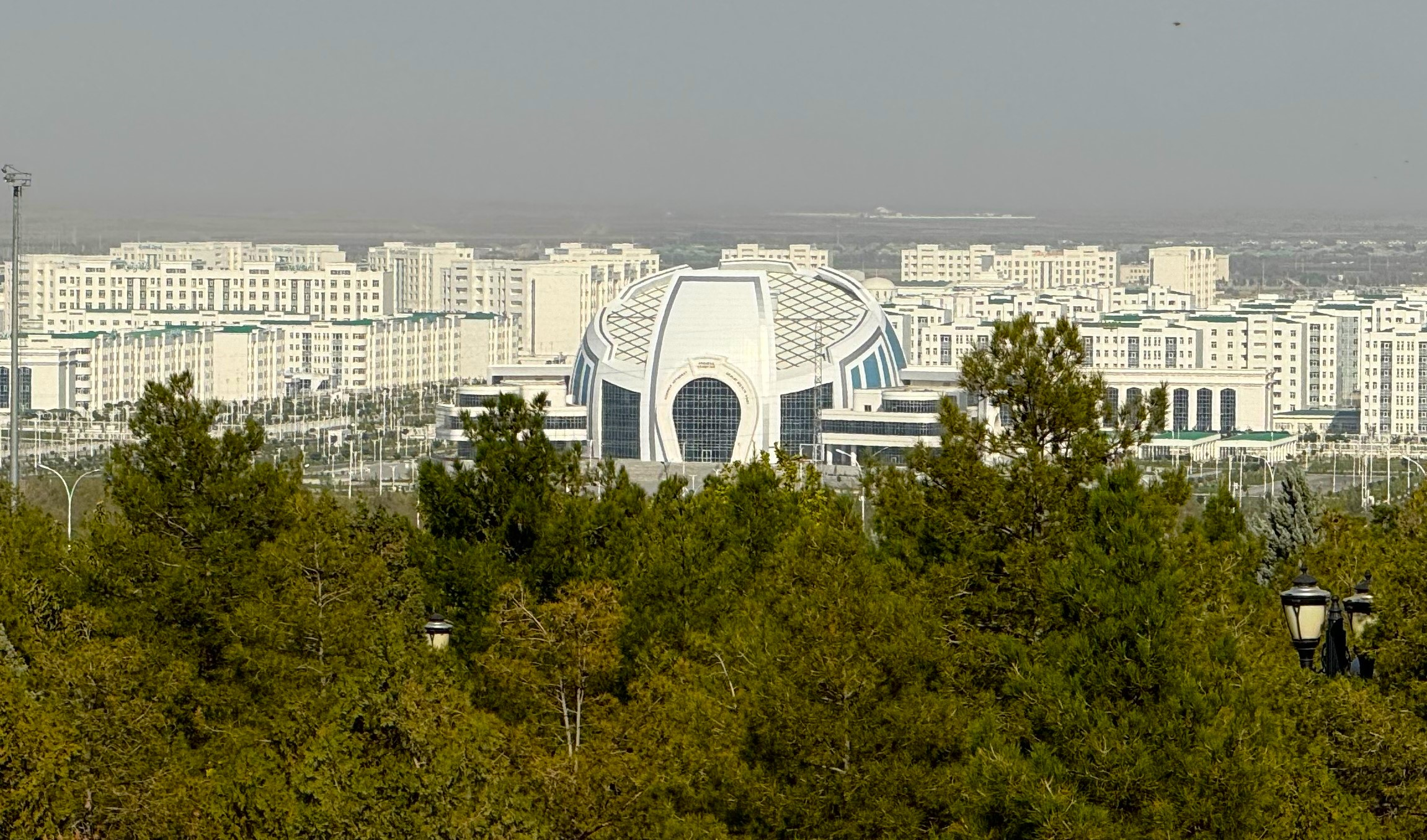

- Location in Turkmenistan
- Coordinates: 38°4′N 58°4′E
- Country: Turkmenistan
- Province: Ahal Province
- Established: 20 December 2022
- Named for: Gurbanguly Berdimuhamedow

Government
  - Mayor (Häkim): Gülşat Mämmedowa

Area
  - Total: 11.21 km^{2} (4.33 sq mi)

Population (2022)
  - Total: 40,524
- Time zone: UTC+5
- Postcode: 745700
- Area code: (+993) 12
- Vehicle registration: AK
- International Airports: Ashgabat International Airport
- Website: arkadag-shaheri.gov.tm

Arkadag (Turkmen arka "behind" + dag "mountain", connoting "protector") is a smart city in southern Turkmenistan. It became the regional capital of Ahal Province effective 20 December 2022. It is a largely greenfield development started in 2019 with an initial budget of $1.5 billion. The city was named in honor of former president Gurbanguly Berdimuhamedow, father of sitting president Serdar Berdimuhamedow, who is officially entitled Arkadag. Uniquely among Turkmen cities, Arkadag is by law designated a "city of state importance".

== Geography ==
The city is situated on a plain due west of the city limit of Turkmenistan's capital city, Ashgabat, and east of the neighboring city of Gökdepe at latitude 38.0659 degrees north and longitude 58.0727 degrees east. By parliamentary decree of 18 March 2023 the city was divided into two districts (Turkmen: etraplar, singular etrap), named Kärizek and Gorjaw. As of 30 March 2023, the districts were upgraded to boroughs, each with a presidentially appointed mayor.

Kärizek Borough includes the town of Aba Annaýew, constructed to house equestrians and support staff for the nearby hippodrome. Aba Annaýew was granted township on 10 May 2023.

Decrees of the Turkmenistan Parliament have periodically transferred land from both Ahal Province and the city of Ashgabat to Arkadag, amending its borders.

== History ==
In November 2018, then-President Gurbanguly Berdimuhamedow began reviewing project proposals for construction of a new capital for Ahal Province. On 4 March 2019, Berdimuhamedow issued a decree ordering construction to begin. Construction began with a ceremonial laying of the cornerstone of the new provincial administration building on 10 April 2019. Although earlier project proposals had planned for the city's area to cover no more than 880 hectares, the approved project was for 1002 hectares.

By parliamentary decree of 20 December 2022, the city was named Arkadag in honor of Berdimuhamedow, the seat of Ahal Province was moved from Anau to Arkadag, and the nearby village of Aba Annaýew was annexed to the city. Local media reported,

With the goals of improving living conditions of the population in the framework of the first phase of construction 258 2-, 5-, 7- and 9-story apartment buildings will be built. In addition, 19 retail stores, 3 repair centers, a hotel, a shopping mall and a leisure park are being built.

On 23 January 2023 the municipal court and prosecutor were created by presidential decree. A law passed in March 2023 on the city's status designated it a "city of national importance" (Turkmen: döwlet ähmiýetli şäher).

In July 2023 opposition media reported that demolition had begun of the village of Gorjaw to allow completion of the new city of Arkadag. State-controlled media reported in October 2023 that the second phase of construction is scheduled to be completed by September 2026. This announcement clarified an earlier report of March 2023 that the second phase of construction was to be completed by 2026.

In November 2023, Arkadag's land area was expanded by another 119 hectares, 102 from neighboring Gökdepe District and 17 from the city of Ashgabat.

=== Cost of construction ===
Opposition media reported in February 2023 that imported construction materials for the second phase of construction would cost an estimated $1.296 billion, in addition to the presumed original cost of phase one construction of $1.466 billion, implying a total cost of city construction in excess of $2.76 billion. In March 2023, however, a Turkmen construction official reported that the first phase would cost an estimated $3.3 billion and the second phase an estimated $1.5 billion, for a total of $4.8 billion.

=== Planned amenities ===
Phase two construction is reported to include

...five secondary schools for 720 pupils each, nine kindergartens for 320 children, a polyclinic, fire station...administrative buildings of the mayor of Arkadag, a museum, a square, a shopping center and a household goods store in one building, 36 five-storey apartment buildings with 30 apartments each, 36 five-storey apartment buildings with 40 apartments each, twenty-four 42-apartment seven-storey building, 14 nine-storey buildings of 54 apartments each...a railway station, a bus depot and a taxi dispatcher station, a bus station of Ahal Province.

In June 2023 President Serdar Berdimuhamedow decreed that the city include a seismological station for monitoring seismic activity. He also decreed that Arkadag city should feature factories for production of "food, industrial, pharmaceutical and medical products". In January 2024, President Berdimuhamedow approved a contract with Goetzpartners Emerging Markets GmbH, a German firm, for consulting services related to construction of facilities for producing food, pharmaceutical, medical, and other industrial goods.

=== City inauguration celebrations ===
President Serdar Berdimuhamedow ordered the Cabinet of Ministers to prepare celebrations in honor of the city's opening for 2023, including a military parade and concert on the Main Square. The cornerstone of the mosque was laid 20 January 2023. By presidential decree the city's formal opening was set for 29 June 2023, which coincided with the birthday of former President Gurbanguly Berdimuhamedow.

== Architecture ==
=== Buildings ===
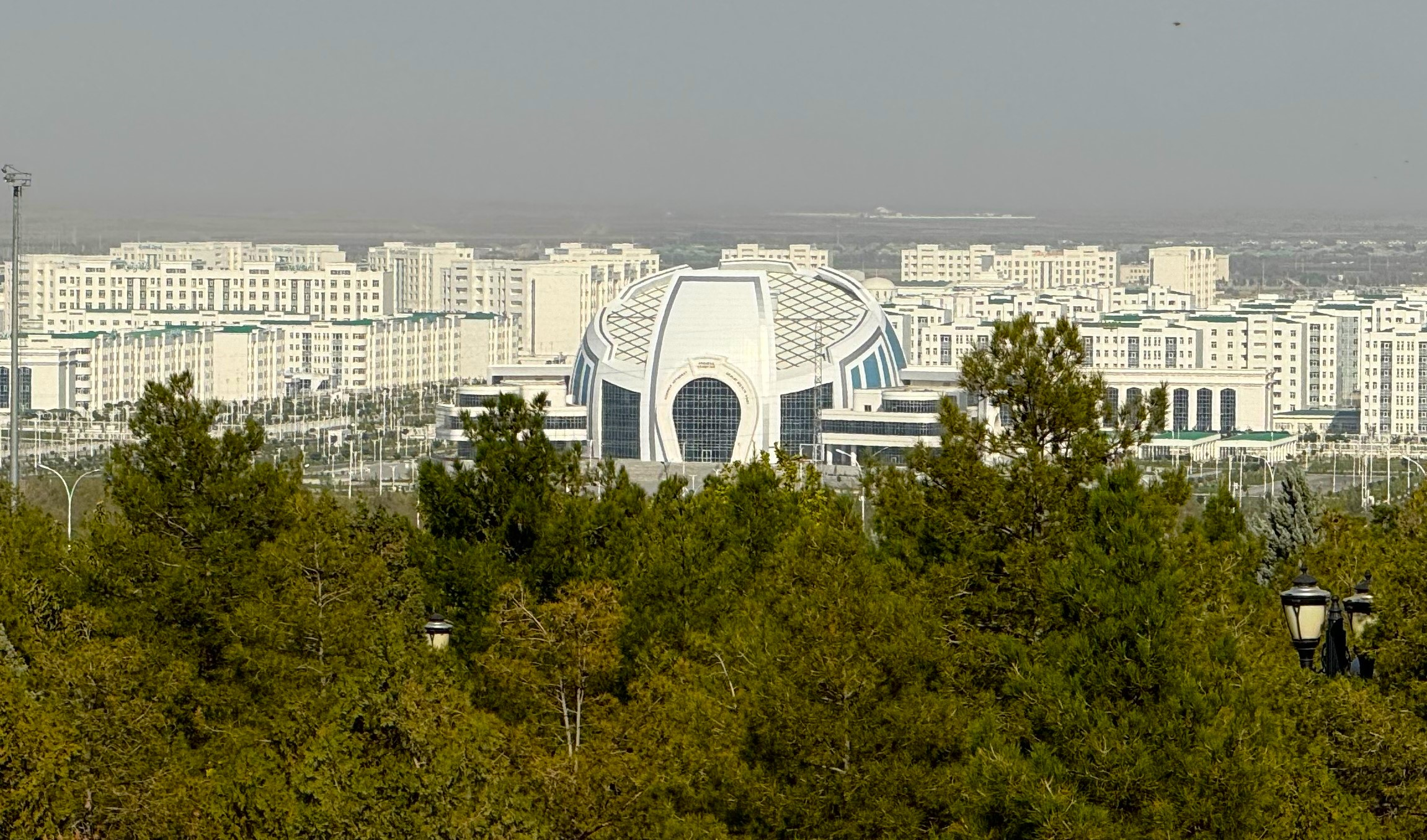
Görogly State Equestrian Circus

The city was built based on a centralized architectural plan following a design competition involving five separate submissions. All buildings are faced with white marble along symmetrically laid out streets. The following facilities will be named as follows:

- Arkadag Monument
- Aba Annaýew International Academy of Horse Breeding
- Berdimuhamed Annayev Ahal Velayat Pedagogical Secondary Vocational School
- Sachly Dursunova Ahal Velayat Medical Secondary Vocational School
- Görogly State Equestrian Circus
- Döwletmämmet Azady Ahal Velayat Library
- Aman Gulmammedov State Drama Theater
- Sahy Jepbarov Specialized Art School of Ahal Velayat
- Shukur Bagshy Children's Art School

All residential buildings, except for the two-story cottages, are equipped with modern elevators able to serve as cargo elevators.

==== Medical institutions ====
- Gurbanguly Berdimuhamedow Health and Rehabilitation Center
- Ahal Region Health Department
- General hospital with 350 beds
- Oncology center with 150 beds,
- Maternal and child health center with 150 beds
- Ambulance center

=== Smart city ===
Arkadag is intended to be Turkmenistan's first "smart city".

== Economy ==
=== Industry ===
It is planned to create an industrial cluster in the city focused on the production of certain types of products from the medical and pharmaceutical industries and baby food. The German company Goetzpartners will provide consulting services for the construction of facilities in the industrial zone of the city of Arkadag for the production of food, industrial, pharmaceutical and medical products.

=== Banking ===
Banking is important for the city. The city has branches of Halkbank, Turkmenistan Bank, Daýhanbank and Senagatbank.

== Street names ==
People's Council of Turkmenistan Chairperson and former President of Turkmenistan Berdimuhamedov has proposed naming Arkadag's streets after "great personages, who left their undimmed impact on national culture, art, literature, and history," and in particular named Berdi Kerbabayev, Kerim Gurbannepesow, Gurbannazar Ezizow, Alty Garlyyev, and Maya Kuliyeva, among others.

== Districts ==
As of 30 March 2023 Arkadag includes two boroughs: Kärizek etraby and Gorjaw etraby, (Turkmen: etraplar), each with a presidentially appointed mayor (Turkmen: häkim).

The former village of Aba Annaýew was upgraded to town status, and is included in Kärizek District.

== Transportation ==
The city is connected to Ashgabat by Kopetdag Avenue and the M37 highway.

The largest nearby airport is Ashgabat International Airport, which offers domestic and international flights.

=== Railway ===
A railway station will be built in the city. There are plans to launch express passenger rail service on the Arkadag-Ashgabat route with a speed of up to 140 km/hour. The travel time of the electric train from Ashgabat to Arkadag will be 18 minutes. It is expected that the project will be implemented by Russian Railways.

A high-speed railroad also is planned from Arkadag to Avaza.

=== Automobile transport ===
The city plans to introduce ground-based public electric transport, including Chinese Yutong electric buses and Jac J7 cars.

Electric vehicles Runhorse Jinma are used to deliver groceries throughout the city.

=== Cycleways ===
The city will include 15 km of bicycle paths. A first mass cycling rally was held in April 2023.

=== Roads ===
The city is equipped with smart traffic lights. They are equipped with special buttons and sound signals so that visually- and hearing-impaired people can easily cross streets. The traffic lights will change their operating mode depending on traffic congestion on the streets and intersections. Computer servers analyze images from street cameras and send signals to the traffic lights.

Sidewalks are paved with tactile sidewalk tiles.

Pedestrian overpasses in the city are equipped with elevators or escalators.

== Media ==
The city launched its own Arkadag television channel and Arkadag newspaper.

As of 2025, the city receives radio 4 FM stations: Owaz, Char Tarapdan, Miras and Watan.

== Telecommunication ==
2G, 3G and LTE networks from Altyn Asyr are available in the city.

On February 22, 2025, high-speed Internet 4G+ was launched.

The official launch of the first 5G city in Turkmenistan was in Arkadag at June 2025. Preparations for the implementation was carried out by the Türkmenaragatnaşyk Agency from February 2025. Huawei base stations is installed. The technology is launched using the TürkmenÄlem 52°E satellite.

Optical GPON network was put into operation in the city. Each apartment was connected to a fiber optic network, which allows you to simultaneously use Internet, IPTV and telephony. The network has covered fixed numbers and provides access to 235 local and international TV channels.

There is a Turkmenpochta office in the city with postal code 745700.

== Sports ==
The city's professional football club, FC Arkadag, plays in the Ýokary Liga, the top league of Turkmenistan. Team play their home games at the Arkadag Stadium. Stadium can accommodate 10,000 spectators. The club having won 2024–25 AFC Challenge League title. Domestically, club have won two league titles and two Turkmenistan Cup, once Turkmenistan Super Cup.

The city has a International Equestrian Sports Complex, which was built in 2011 (at that time in the Gökdepe District of the Ahal Region).

== Education ==
=== Higher education ===
The International horse breeding Academy is located in the city. It provides higher education to specialists in the horse breeding industry. Academy offers specialist and bachelor’s degree programs in the following fields: horse breeding, veterinary medicine, horse training, veterinary-sanitary expertise, national equestrian sports, circus arts, agricultural economics and management, accounting and auditing in agriculture, as well as equestrian sport and tourism (taught in English).

== Twin towns and sister cities ==
Arkadag is twinned with:

- (Russia) Kazan (Tatarstan), since 2023
- (Georgia (country)) Telavi (Georgia), since 2023
- Maisons-Laffitte (France), since 2023
- Füzuli (Azerbaijan), since 2025

== See also ==
- List of places named after people
