= Arkadag Stadium =

Stadium in Turkmenistan

Arkadag Stadium Arkadag Stadiony
- Interactive map of Arkadag Stadium; Arkadag Stadiony
- Location: Arkadag, Turkmenistan
- Coordinates: 38.0601°N 58.0810°E
- Owner: Arkadag City Administration
- Capacity: 10,000
- Surface: Grass
- Scoreboard: Yes

Construction
- Opened: 1 July 2023

Tenant
- FK Arkadag (2023–present)

Arkadag Stadium (Turkmen: Arkadag Stadiony) is a multi-purpose stadium in Arkadag, Turkmenistan. It primarily serves as the home stadium of FK Arkadag. The stadium has a capacity of 10,000 spectators.

== History ==
The Arkadag Stadiony was constructed between December 2019 and February 2023. Situated at 30 Magtymguly Pyragy Street in the city of Arkadag, is a sports facility designed to support the practice of weightlifting, table tennis, boxing, archery, athletics, and football, offering conditions for training and competition across a wide range of disciplines.

On July 1, 2023, the newly built stadium hosted its first football match as the local team Arkadag defeated the reigning champion of Turkmenistan Ahal FK by 3–0. The match, played in front of a full 10,000 crowd, marked the start of a new chapter for Arkadag, with goals scored by Begmyrat Baýow, Şanazar Tirkişow, and Orazberdi Myradow. Arkadag Stadium hosted the 2023 Turkmenistan Cup final. The AFC Challenge League was the first international tournament hosted at the stadium.

== Overview ==
The total area of the complex is 16.98 hectares, with the administrative building covering 36.66 m². The stadium structure stands at a height of 22.10 meters and includes two floors along with a basement level. Designed to accommodate 10,000 spectators, the stadium consists of seven interconnected blocks. The main football field covers an area of 7,844 m², while the total sports field space amounts to 1,057.12 m².

== See also ==
- List of football stadiums in Turkmenistan
- Football in Turkmenistan
- Nusaý Stadium
