= 2023 FC Machida Zelvia season =

FC Machida Zelvia
2023 season
- Manager: Go Kuroda
- Stadium: Machida GION Stadium
- J2 League: 1st (Promoted; Champions)
- Emperor's Cup: Fourth round
- Top goalscorer: League: Erik (14 Goals); All: Erik (18 goals)
- Biggest win: 0–6 (vs V-Varen Nagasaki
- Biggest defeat: 1–3 JEF United Chiba
Home colours	Away colours

The 2023 season was FC Machida Zelvia's 34th season in existence and the club's eighth consecutive season in the second division of Japanese football. In addition to the domestic league, FC Machida Zelvia also participated in this season's edition of the Emperor's Cup.

== Players ==
=== Season squad ===
As of 8 September 2023.

Note: Flags indicate national team as defined under FIFA eligibility rules; some limited exceptions apply. Players may hold more than one non-FIFA nationality.

No.	Pos.	Nation	Player
1	GK	SRB	Nedeljko Stojišić
2	DF	JPN	Masayuki Okuyama
3	DF	JPN	Kai Miki
4	DF	JPN	Jurato Ikeda
6	DF	JPN	Kosuke Ota
7	FW	JPN	Shunta Araki (on loan from Sagan Tosu)
9	FW	JPN	Takaya Numata
10	MF	JPN	Daigo Takahashi
11	FW	BRA	Erik
14	DF	KOR	Jang Min-gyu
15	FW	AUS	Mitchell Duke
16	MF	JPN	Zento Uno
18	MF	JPN	Hokuto Shimoda
19	MF	JPN	Shuto Inaba
22	MF	JPN	Hijiri Onaga
23	GK	JPN	William Popp
24	DF	JPN	Mizuki Uchida

No.	Pos.	Nation	Player
25	FW	JPN	Shota Fujio (on loan from Cerezo Osaka)
27	FW	JPN	Yu Hirakawa
28	MF	JPN	Yohei Okuyama
29	FW	BRA	Ademilson
30	FW	JPN	Yuki Nakashima
31	FW	JPN	Yuya Takazawa
33	MF	JPN	Renji Matsui (on loan from Kawasaki Frontale)
34	DF	JPN	Yudai Fujiwara (on loan from Urawa Red Diamonds)
37	FW	JPN	Kohei Ashibe ^{DSP}
38	MF	JPN	Tenshiro Takasaki ^{DSP}
39	FW	CHI	Byron Vásquez
40	MF	JPN	Sho Fuseya
41	MF	JPN	Takuya Yasui
42	GK	JPN	Koki Fukui
43	DF	JPN	Junya Suzuki
47	DF	JPN	Daisuke Matsumoto (on loan from Sagan Tosu)
50	GK	JPN	Anton Burns

=== Out on loan ===
Note: Flags indicate national team as defined under FIFA eligibility rules; some limited exceptions apply. Players may hold more than one non-FIFA nationality.

No.	Pos.	Nation	Player
46	MF	JPN	Ken Higuchi (on loan at Okinawa SV)
—	DF	JPN	Shohei Takahashi (on loan at Vissel Kobe)
—	DF	JPN	Soichiro Fukaminato (on loan at Kamatamare Sanuki)
—	DF	JPN	Takumi Narasaka (on loan at Kamatamare Sanuki)

No.	Pos.	Nation	Player
—	DF	JPN	Yoshitaka Aoki (on loan at ReinMeer Aomori)
—	MF	JPN	Atsushi Kurokawa (on loan at Omiya Ardija)
—	FW	JPN	Daiki Sato (on loan at YSCC Yokohama)

== Transfers ==
=== Arrivals ===
Date	Position	Player	From	Type	Source
25 November 2022	MF	(Japan) Shuto Inaba	(Japan) Blaublitz Akita	Full	
7 December 2022	DF	(Japan) Jurato Ikeda	(Japan) Blaublitz Akita	Full	
7 December 2022	DF	(South Korea) Jang Min-gyu	(Japan) JEF United Chiba	Full	
9 December 2022	FW	(Japan) Takaya Numata	(Japan) Renofa Yamaguchi	Full	
15 December 2022	FW	(Japan) Shunta Araki	(Japan) Sagan Tosu	Loan	
16 December 2022	MF	(Japan) Yohei Okuyama	(Japan) Iwate Grulla Morioka	Full	
19 December 2022	MF	(Japan) Atsushi Kurokawa	(Japan) Júbilo Iwata	Full	
19 December 2022	DF	(Japan) Yudai Fujiwara	(Japan) Urawa Red Diamonds	Loan	
24 December 2022	MF	(Japan) Hokuto Shimoda	(Japan) Oita Trinita	Full	
25 December 2022	DF	(Spain) Carlos Gutiérrez	(Japan) Tochigi SC	Full	
26 December 2022	MF	(Japan) Daigo Takahashi	(Japan) Shimizu S-Pulse	Full	
31 December 2022	FW	(Australia) Mitchell Duke	(Japan) Fagiano Okayama	Full	
1 January 2023	FW	(Brazil) Erik	(China) Changchun Yatai	Full	
3 January 2023	MF	(Japan) Sho Fuseya	(Japan) Kokushikan University	Full	
3 January 2023	DF	(Japan) Mizuki Uchida	(Japan) Kamatamare Sanuki	Full	
6 January 2023	FW	(Japan) Yuya Takazawa	(Japan) Oita Trinita	Full	
9 January 2023	GK	(Serbia) Nedeljko Stojišić	(Japan) Vegalta Sendai	Full	
1 February 2023	FW	(Japan) Yu Hirakawa	(Japan) Yamanashi Gakuin University	Full	
1 February 2023	DF	(Japan) Soichiro Fukaminato	(Japan) Rissho University	Full	
6 March 2023	FW	(Japan) Shota Fujio	(Japan) Cerezo Osaka	Loan	
21 April 2023	MF	(Japan) Tenshiro Takasaki	(Japan) Quon Football Development	Type 2	
6 July 2023	MF	(Chile) Byron Vásquez	(Japan) Tokyo Verdy	Full	
11 July 2023	DF	(Japan) Junya Suzuki	(Japan) FC Tokyo	Full	
3 August 2023	DF	(Japan) Daisuke Matsumoto	(Japan) Sagan Tosu	Full	
5 September 2023	FW	(Brazil) Ademilson	(China) Wuhan Three Towns	Full	

=== Departures ===
Date	Position	Player	To	Type	Source
End of 2022 season	MF	(Japan) Shunya Suganuma		Contract expiration	
28 October 2022	FW	(North Korea) Jong Tae-se		Retired	
1 November 2022	FW	(Brazil) Vinícius Araújo		Contract expiration	
3 November 2022	MF	(Japan) Ariajasuru Hasegawa		Contract expiration	
29 November 2022	DF	(Japan) Jun Okano	(Japan) V-Varen Nagasaki	Full	
7 December 2022	MF	(Japan) Taiki Hirato	(Japan) Kyoto Sanga	Full	
13 December 2022	FW	(Japan) Shusuke Ota	(Japan) Albirex Niigata	Full	
21 December 2022	MF	(Japan) Kaishu Sano	(Japan) Kashima Antlers	Full	
3 January 2023	DF	(Japan) Takumi Narasaka	(Japan) Kamatamare Sanuki	Loan	
6 January 2023	FW	(Brazil) Dudu	(Japan) FC Imabari	Full	
16 March 2023	DF	(Japan) Shohei Takahashi	(Japan) Vissel Kobe	Loan	
28 June 2023	DF	(Japan) Soichiro Fukaminato	(Japan) Kamatamare Sanuki	Loan	
4 July 2023	MF	(Japan) Atsushi Kurokawa	(Japan) Omiya Ardija	Loan	
18 July 2023	MF	(Japan) Leo Takae	(Japan) Montedio Yamagata	Full	
27 July 2023	MF	(Japan) Kota Fukatsu	(Japan) Iwate Grulla Morioka	Full	
6 August 2023	MF	(Japan) Ken Higuchi	(Japan) Okinawa SV	Full	
8 August 2023	DF	(Spain) Carlos Gutiérrez	(Japan) V-Varen Nagasaki	Full	
18 August 2023	MF	(Japan) Kazuma Yamaguchi	(Japan) Montedio Yamagata	Loan return	

== Competitions ==
=== Overview ===
Competition	First match	Last match	Starting round	Final position	Record							
Competition	First match	Last match	Starting round	Final position	Pld	W	D	L	GF	GA	GD	Win %
J2 League	18 February 2023	12 November 2023	Matchday 1	Winners	42	26	9	7	79	35	+44	61.90
Emperor's Cup	7 June 2023	2 August 2023	Second round	Round of 16	3	2	0	1	7	4	+3	66.67
Total					45	28	9	8	86	39	+47	62.22

Source: Competitions

=== J2 League ===
==== League table ====
Pos	Team	Pld	W	D	L	GF	GA	GD	Pts	Promotion or relegation
1	Machida Zelvia (C, P)	42	26	9	7	79	35	+44	87	Promotion to the J1 League
2	Júbilo Iwata (P)	42	21	12	9	74	44	+30	75	Promotion to the J1 League
3	Tokyo Verdy (O, P)	42	21	12	9	57	31	+26	75	Qualification for the promotion play-offs
4	Shimizu S-Pulse	42	20	14	8	78	34	+44	74	Qualification for the promotion play-offs
5	Montedio Yamagata	42	21	4	17	64	54	+10	67	Qualification for the promotion play-offs

Source: Meiji Yasuda J2 League, J.League Data Site
Rules for classification: 1) Points; 2) Goal difference; 3) Goals scored; 4) Head-to-head points; 5) Head-to-head goal difference; 6) Head-to-head goal scored; 7) Fair-play points.
(C) Champions; (O) Play-off winners; (P) Promoted

==== Results summary ====
Overall								Home						Away					
Pld	W	D	L	GF	GA	GD	Pts	W	D	L	GF	GA	GD	W	D	L	GF	GA	GD
42	26	9	7	79	35	+44	87	13	4	4	41	22	+19	13	5	3	38	13	+25

Source: Worldfootball

==== Results by round ====
Round	1	2	3	4	5	6	7	8	9	10	11	12	13	14	15	16	17	18	19	20	21	22	23	24	25	26	27	28	29	30	31	32	33	34	35	36	37	38	39	40	41	42
Ground	H	H	A	H	A	A	H	H	A	H	A	H	A	H	A	H	H	A	A	H	A	A	H	A	H	H	H	A	H	A	H	A	H	A	A	H	H	A	A	H	A	A
Result	D	W	W	W	W	W	W	L	D	W	L	W	W	D	W	W	W	L	W	W	D	D	W	W	D	L	W	W	W	L	W	D	L	D	W	L	D	W	W	W	W	W
Position	10	4	2	1	1	1	1	1	2	1	1	1	1	1	1	1	1	1	1	1	1	1	1	1	1	1	1	1	1	1	1	1	1	1	1	1	1	1	1	1	1	1

Source: Worldfootball
A = Away; H = Home; W = Win; D = Draw; L = Loss

==== Matches ====
The league fixtures were announced on 20 January 2023.

19 February 1	Machida Zelvia	0–0	Vegalta Sendai	Machida
14:00		Report		Stadium: Machida GION Stadium; Attendance: 8,055; Referee: Yosuke Kubota

26 February 2	Machida Zelvia	2–0	Thespakusatsu Gunma	Machida
14:00	Ikeda 38'; Onaga 84'	Report		Stadium: Machida GION Stadium; Attendance: 3,160; Referee: Shuhei Shimizu

5 March 3	Zweigen Kanazawa	1–2	Machida Zelvia	Kanazawa
14:00	Hayashi 90+8'	Report	Hirakawa 11'; Araki 90+1'	Stadium: Ishikawa Kanazawa Stadium; Attendance: 6,218; Referee: Atsushi Kamimura

12 March 4	Machida Zelvia	3–0	Mito HollyHock	Machida
14:00	Erik 14'; Takahashi 64'; Araki 76'	Report		Stadium: Machida GION Stadium; Attendance: 3,882; Referee: Koei Koya

19 March 5	Montedio Yamagata	0–3	Machida Zelvia	Tendo
14:00		Report	Erik 24', 52'; Araki 82'	Stadium: ND Soft Stadium Yamagata; Attendance: 11,855; Referee: Toru Kakinuma

26 March 6	Iwaki FC	0–1	Machida Zelvia	Iwaki
14:00		Report	Kurokawa 87'	Stadium: Iwaki Greenfield Stadium; Attendance: 2,022; Referee: Hirokazu Otsubo

2 April 7	Machida Zelvia	1–0	Fujieda MYFC	Machida
14:00	Duke 5'	Report		Stadium: Machida GION Stadium; Attendance: 3,571; Referee: Hiroyoshi Takayama

8 April 8	Machida Zelvia	0–1	Blaublitz Akita	Machida
14:00		Report	Abe 84'	Stadium: Machida GION Stadium; Attendance: 3,219; Referee: Yudai Yamamoto

12 April 9	Júbilo Iwata	1–1	Machida Zelvia	Iwata
19:00	K. Suzuki (yellow card) 3'; Kaneko 45+2'; Kanuma 69'; Y. Suzuki (yellow card) 82'; Dudu (yellow card) 82'; Yamada (yellow card) 90'	Report	Hirakawa 11' (yellow card) 38'; Popp (yellow card) 50'; Fujiwara (red card) 82'; Carlos (yellow card) 90+4'	Stadium: Yamaha Stadium; Attendance: 5,158; Referee: Yosuke Kubota

16 April 10	Machida Zelvia	3–1	Oita Trinita	Machida
14:00	Araki 23', 33'; Erik 39'	Report	Utsumoto 75'	Stadium: Machida GION Stadium; Attendance: 6,215; Referee: Hiroyuki Kimura

22 April 11	Ventforet Kofu	1–0	Machida Zelvia	Kofu
14:00	Utaka 41'; Sugai (yellow card) 57'; Matsumoto (yellow card) 90+2'	Report	Takae (yellow card) 55'	Stadium: JIT Recycle Ink Stadium; Attendance: 6,494; Referee: Koji Takasaki

29 April 12	Machida Zelvia	2–1	Roasso Kumamoto	Machida
14:00	Okuyama 8'; Erik 63' (pen.); Fujio (yellow card) 71'	Report	Ishikawa 88'	Stadium: Machida GION Stadium; Attendance: 4,020; Referee: Atsushi Kamimura

3 May 13	Omiya Ardija	0–1	Machida Zelvia	Saitama
14:00	Rodrigo (yellow card) 28', (penalty missed) 72'	Report	Onaga 16'; Popp (yellow card) 70'	Stadium: NACK5 Stadium Omiya; Attendance: 6,973; Referee: Kazuyoshi Enomoto

7 May 14	Machida Zelvia	1–1	Fagiano Okayama	Machida
14:00	Hirakawa 55'	Report	Tiago Alves 16'; Suzuki (yellow card) 72'; Kawai (yellow card) 90'	Stadium: Machida GION Stadium; Attendance: 3,477; Referee: Keigo Sendachi

13 May 15	Tokyo Verdy	0–1	Machida Zelvia	Tokyo
15:00		Report	Erik 45+1'	Stadium: Ajinomoto Stadium; Attendance: 7,477; Referee: Reo Tanaka

17 May 16	Machida Zelvia	2–0	Renofa Yamaguchi	Machida
19:03	Duke 14'; Shimoda 83'	Report		Stadium: Machida GION Stadium; Attendance: 2,903; Referee: Hiroyoshi Takayama

21 May 17	Machida Zelvia	2–1	Shimizu S-Pulse	Machida
14:03	Hirakawa 31'; Jang 90+6'	Report	Nakayama 42'	Stadium: Machida GION Stadium; Attendance: 10,444; Referee: Tetsuro Yoshida

28 May 18	Tokushima Vortis	2–1	Machida Zelvia	Naruto
14:03	Mori 74'; Kakitani 80'	Report	Erik 43'; Hirakawa (yellow card) 34' (yellow-red card) 62'	Stadium: Pocarisweat Stadium; Attendance: 5,884; Referee: Ryo Tanimoto

3 June 19	JEF United Chiba	0–2	Machida Zelvia	Chiba
18:03		Report	Numata 90+1'; Fujio 90+6'	Stadium: Fukuda Denshi Arena; Attendance: 6,831; Referee: Shu Kawamata

11 June 20	Machida Zelvia	4–1	V-Varen Nagasaki	Machida
14:03	Duke 30', 58'; Erik 43', 64'	Report	Juanma 84'	Stadium: Machida GION Stadium; Attendance: 3,983; Referee: Dai Matsumoto

18 June 21	Tochigi SC	1–1	Machida Zelvia	Utsunomiya
18:00	Miyazaki 27'	Report	Erik 78'	Stadium: Kanseki Stadium Tochigi; Attendance: 4,737; Referee: Yoshimi Yamashita

24 June 22	Mito HollyHock	1–1	Machida Zelvia	Mito
18:03	Umeda 65'	Report	Erik 47'	Stadium: K's denki Stadium Mito; Attendance: 4,013; Referee: Yuzo Sutani

1 July 23	Machida Zelvia	3–2	Omiya Ardija	Machida
18:03	Erik 39', 79'; Fujio 88'	Report	Nakano 7'; Shibayama 36'	Stadium: Machida GION Stadium; Attendance: 5,845; Referee: Tomokazu Sato

5 July 24	Oita Trinita	0–3	Machida Zelvia	Ōita
19:03		Report	Jang 38'; Erik 63'; Onaga 87'	Stadium: Resonac Dome Oita; Attendance: 6,425; Referee: Koei Koya

9 July 25	Machida Zelvia	2–2	Tokyo Verdy	Tokyo
18:04	Fujio 2'; Yasui 38'	Report	Someno 73', 83'	Stadium: Japan National Stadium; Attendance: 38,402; Referee: Hayato Shimizu

22 July 26	Machida Zelvia	1–3	JEF United Chiba	Machida
18:03	Duke 72'	Report	Suzuki 10'; Komori 28' (pen.); Miki 73'	Stadium: Machida GION Stadium; Attendance: 5,225; Referee: Toru Kakinuma
Note: Matchweek 27. Matchweek 26 was eventually played on 14 October.

29 July 27	Machida Zelvia	2–1	Tokushima Vortis	Machida
18:03	Erik 32'; Elsinho 68' (o.g.)	Report	Elsinho 35'	Stadium: Machida GION Stadium; Attendance: 3,561; Referee: Kazuyoshi Enomoto
Note: Matchweek 28

5 August 28	Fagiano Okayama	1–3	Machida Zelvia	Okayama
19:03	Tanaka 6'	Report	Jang 39'; Erik 47'; Hirakawa 71'	Stadium: City Light Stadium; Attendance: 10,164; Referee: Hiroki Kasahara
Note: Matchweek 29

12 August 29	Machida Zelvia	2–1	Júbilo Iwata	Machida
18:04	Erik 45' (pen.); Fujio 56' (pen.)	Report	Matsubara 90+4'	Stadium: Machida GION Stadium; Attendance: 11,918; Referee: Yusuke Araki
Note: Matchweek 30

19 August 30	Shimizu S-Pulse	3–2	Machida Zelvia	Shizuoka
18:03	Carlinhos Júnior 44'; Inui 61'; Santana 84'	Report	Takahashi 4'; Lima 23'	Stadium: IAI Stadium Nihondaira, Shizuoka; Attendance: 17,989; Referee: Keigo Sendachi
Note: Matchweek 31

26 August 31	Machida Zelvia	5–0	Montedio Yamagata	Machida
18:04	Fujio 19' (pen.), 84'; Numata 31'; Duke 37'; Vásquez 74'	Report		Stadium: Machida GION Stadium; Attendance: 6,575; Referee: Koji Takasaki
Note: Matchweek 32

3 September 32	Thespakusatsu Gunma	0–0	Machida Zelvia	Maebashi
19:03		Report		Stadium: Shoda Shoyu Stadium Gunma; Attendance: 4,051; Referee: Yuzo Sutani
Note: Matchweek 33

9 September 33	Machida Zelvia	0–1	Tochigi SC	Machida
18:04	Jang 54' (o.g.)	Report		Stadium: Machida GION Stadium; Attendance: 5,577; Referee: Tetsuro Yoshida
Note: Matchweek 34

17 September 34	Fujieda MYFC	0–0	Machida Zelvia	Fujieda
18:03		Report		Stadium: Fujieda Soccer Stadium; Attendance: 4,566; Referee: Yosuke Kubota
Note: Matchweek 35

23 September 35	V-Varen Nagasaki	0–6	Machida Zelvia	Isahaya
17:04	Nakamura (yellow card) (red card) 21'	Report	Duke 36'; Suzuki 45+6'; Fujio 73'; Matsui 78'; Shimoda 85'; Yasui 88'	Stadium: Transcosmos Stadium Nagasaki; Attendance: 6,223; Referee: Tetsuro Yoshida
Note: Matchweek 36

1 October 36	Machida Zelvia	2–3	Iwaki FC	Machida
14:03	Jang 51'; Duke 85'	Report	Yamashita 31'; Tanimura 41'; Endo 46'	Stadium: Machida GION Stadium; Attendance: 6,417; Referee: Toru Kakinuma
Note: Matchweek 37

8 October 37	Machida Zelvia	3–3	Ventforet Kofu	Machida
14:04	Fujio 37'; Uno 41', 90+7'	Report	Iijima 26'; Sekiguchi 82'; Getúlio 90+2'	Stadium: Machida GION Stadium; Attendance: 8,326; Referee: Keigo Sendachi
Note: Matchweek 38

14 October 38	Blaublitz Akita	1–2	Machida Zelvia	Akita
14:03	R. Saito 41'	Report	Araki 11'; Shimoda 45+6'	Stadium: Soyu Stadium; Attendance: 3,004; Referee: Takuto Okabe
Note: Matchweek 26

22 October 39	Roasso Kumamoto	0–3	Machida Zelvia	Kumamoto
13:05		Report	Uno 44'; Takahashi 52'; Shimoda 61'	Stadium: Egao Kenko Stadium; Attendance: 9,895; Referee: Tomokazu Sato

29 October 40	Machida Zelvia	1–0	Zweigen Kanazawa	Machida
14:03	Hirakawa 3'	Report		Stadium: Machida GION Stadium; Attendance: 11,181; Referee: Keisuke Nobori

5 November 41	Renofa Yamaguchi	0–2	Machida Zelvia	Yamaguchi
13:08		Report	Shimoda 54'; Duke 68'	Stadium: Ishin Me-Life Stadium; Attendance: 7,022; Referee: Koji Takasaki

12 November 42	Vegalta Sendai	1–3	Machida Zelvia	Sendai
13:03	Ryunosuke Sugawara 66'	Report	Koide 47' (o.g.); Duke 55'; Ademilson 88'	Stadium: Yurtec Stadium Sendai; Attendance: 13,138; Referee: Hiroyoshi Takayama

=== Emperor's Cup ===
7 June Second round	Zweigen Kanazawa	2–3	Machida Zelvia	Kanazawa
19:00 JST	Toyoda 23'; Nagamine 88'	Report; Report	Matsui 38'; Kurokawa 43'; Nakashima 79'	Stadium: Ishikawa Athletics Stadium; Attendance: 1,177; Referee: Reo Tanaka

12 July Third round	Yokohama F. Marinos	1–4	Machida Zelvia	Machida
18:33 JST	Inoue 84'	Report; Report	Duke 5'; Fuseya 45+4'; Hirakawa 66', 78'	Stadium: Machida GION Stadium; Attendance: 6,361; Referee: Yuichi Nishimura

2 August Round of 16	Machida Zelvia	0–1	Albirex Niigata	Machida
18:30 JST		Report; Report	Komi 90'	Stadium: Machida GION Stadium; Attendance: 3,436; Referee: Yoshiro Imamura
