= 2023 Renofa Yamaguchi FC season =

Renofa Yamaguchi
2023 season
- Chairman: Takashi Kawamura
- Manager: Yoshihiro Natsuka
- Stadium: Ishin Me-Life Stadium
- J2 League: 18th
- Emperor's Cup: Second round
Home colours	Away colours
- All statistics correct as of 13 May 2023.

The 2023 season was Renofa Yamaguchi's 74th season in existence and the club's eighth consecutive season in the second division of Japanese football. In addition to the domestic league, Renofa Yamaguchi participated in this season's edition of the Emperor's Cup.

== Players ==
=== First-team squad ===
As of 6 January 2023.

Note: Flags indicate national team as defined under FIFA eligibility rules; some limited exceptions apply. Players may hold more than one non-FIFA nationality.

No.	Pos.	Nation	Player
1	GK	KOR	Choi Hyun-chan
2	DF	JPN	Hidenori Takahashi
3	DF	BRA	Renan
4	MF	JPN	Riku Kamigaki
5	DF	JPN	Daisuke Matsumoto
6	MF	JPN	Shinya Yajima
7	MF	JPN	Hiroto Ishikawa
8	MF	JPN	Kensuke Sato
9	FW	JPN	Yusuke Minagawa
10	MF	JPN	Joji Ikegami
11	MF	JPN	Toshiya Tanaka
13	FW	JPN	Shuhei Otsuki
14	DF	JPN	Keigo Numata
15	DF	JPN	Takayuki Mae
16	MF	JPN	Masakazu Yoshioka

No.	Pos.	Nation	Player
17	GK	JPN	Daisuke Yoshimitsu
18	FW	JPN	Daisuke Takagi
19	MF	JPN	Yuan Matsuhashi (On loan from Tokyo Verdy)
20	FW	JPN	Kota Kawano
21	GK	JPN	Kentaro Seki
22	DF	JPN	Jin Ikoma
24	FW	JPN	Tsubasa Umeki
26	FW	JPN	Kazuya Noyori
28	MF	JPN	Seigo Kobayashi
31	GK	JPN	Riku Terakado (On loan from Yokohama F. Marinos)
32	FW	JPN	Taiyo Igarashi (On loan from Kawasaki Frontale)
33	MF	JPN	Koji Yamase
41	DF	JPN	Reo Kunimoto
47	DF	JPN	Ginta Uemoto

=== Out on loan ===
Note: Flags indicate national team as defined under FIFA eligibility rules; some limited exceptions apply. Players may hold more than one non-FIFA nationality.

No.	Pos.	Nation	Player
—	GK	JPN	Genki Yamada (On loan at Kataller Toyama)
—	DF	JPN	Kaili Shimbo (On loan at Iwate Grulla Morioka)

No.	Pos.	Nation	Player
—	MF	JPN	Kento Hashimoto (On loan at Yokohama FC)

== Transfers ==
Transfers in
Join on	Pos.	Player	Moving from	Transfer type
Pre-season	GK	(South Korea) Choi Hyun-chan	(South Korea) Sunmoon University	Free transfer
Pre-season	DF	(Japan) Keigo Numata	(Japan) FC Ryukyu	Free transfer
Pre-season	DF	(Japan) Daisuke Matsumoto	(Japan) Sagan Tosu	Loan transfer
Pre-season	DF	(Japan) Reo Kunimoto	(Singapore) Albirex Niigata (S)	Loan return
Pre-season	MF	(Japan) Seigo Kobayashi	(Japan) Oita Trinita	Full transfer
Pre-season	MF	(Japan) Shinya Yajima	(Japan) Omiya Ardija	Full transfer
Pre-season	MF	(Japan) Toshiya Tanaka	(Japan) Thespakusatsu Gunma	Full transfer
Pre-season	FW	(Japan) Yusuke Minagawa	(Japan) Vegalta Sendai	Full transfer
Pre-season	FW	(Japan) Kazuya Noyori	(Japan) Osaka University HSS	Free transfer
Pre-season	FW	(Japan) Taiyo Igarashi	(Japan) Kawasaki Frontale	Loan transfer
Pre-season	FW	(Japan) Yuan Matsuhashi	(Japan) Tokyo Verdy	Loan transfer

Transfers out
Leave on	Pos.	Player	Moving to	Transfer type
Pre-season	GK	(Japan) Genki Yamada	(Japan) Blaublitz Akita	Free transfer
Pre-season	GK	(Japan) Akira Fantini	(Japan) Fukushima United	Loan expiration
Pre-season	DF	(Japan) Ryosuke Ito	(Japan) Fukui United	Free transfer
Pre-season	DF	(Japan) Kaili Shimbo	(Japan) Iwate Grulla Morioka	Loan transfer
Pre-season	DF	(Japan) Kaito Kuwahara	(Japan) Avispa Fukuoka	Loan expiration
Pre-season	DF	(Japan) Wataru Tanaka	(Japan) Vegalta Sendai	Loan expiration
Pre-season	DF	(Japan) Hirofumi Watanabe	–	Retirement
Pre-season	DF	(Japan) Kaito Oki	–	Retirement
Pre-season	DF	(Japan) Kosuke Kikuchi	–	Retirement
Pre-season	MF	(Japan) Kazuma Takai	(Japan) Yokohama FC	Full transfer
Pre-season	MF	(Japan) Hikaru Manabe	(Japan) Tegevajaro Miyazaki	Free transfer
Pre-season	MF	(Japan) Yatsunori Shimaya	(Japan) Sonio Takamatsu	Free transfer
Pre-season	MF	(Japan) Kento Hashimoto	(Japan) Yokohama FC	Loan transfer
Pre-season	MF	(Japan) Hikaru Naruoka	(Japan) Shimizu S-Pulse	Loan expiration
Pre-season	MF	(Japan) Kentaro Sato	–	Retirement
Pre-season	FW	(Japan) Takaya Numata	(Japan) Machida Zelvia	Full transfer
Pre-season	FW	(Japan) Kazuhito Kishida	(Japan) Baleine Shimonoseki	Free transfer
Pre-season	FW	(Japan) Reoto Kodama	(Japan) Sagan Tosu	Loan expiration

== Competitions ==
=== Overview ===
Competition	First match	Last match	Starting round	Record							
Competition	First match	Last match	Starting round	Pld	W	D	L	GF	GA	GD	Win %
J2 League	18 February 2023	12 November 2023	Matchday 1	15	3	6	6	15	29	−14	20.00
Emperor's Cup	7 June 2023		Second round	0	0	0	0	0	0	+0	—
Total				15	3	6	6	15	29	−14	20.00

Last updated: 13 May 2023
Source: Soccerway

=== J2 League ===
==== League table ====
Pos	Team	Pld	W	D	L	GF	GA	GD	Pts	Promotion or relegation
18	Iwaki FC	42	12	11	19	45	69	−24	47	
19	Tochigi SC	42	10	14	18	39	47	−8	44	
20	Renofa Yamaguchi	42	10	14	18	37	67	−30	44	
21	Omiya Ardija (R)	42	11	6	25	37	71	−34	39	Relegation to J3 League
22	Zweigen Kanazawa (R)	42	9	8	25	41	70	−29	35	Relegation to J3 League

Source: Meiji Yasuda J2 League, J.League Data Site
Rules for classification: 1) Points; 2) Goal difference; 3) Goals scored; 4) Head-to-head points; 5) Head-to-head goal difference; 6) Head-to-head goal scored; 7) Fair-play points.
(R) Relegated

==== Results summary ====
Overall								Home						Away					
Pld	W	D	L	GF	GA	GD	Pts	W	D	L	GF	GA	GD	W	D	L	GF	GA	GD
15	3	6	6	15	29	−14	15	1	4	3	7	17	−10	2	2	3	8	12	−4

Last updated: 13 May 2023.
Source: Worldfootball

==== Results by round ====
Round	1	2	3	4	5	6	7	8	9	10	11	12	13	14	15	16	17	18	19	20	21
Ground	H	H	A	H	A	H	A	H	A	H	A	A	H	A	H	A	H	A	H	A	
Result	W	D	W	L	L	L	W	D	L	L	D	D	D	L	D						
Position	5	6	3	7	10	15	9	13	15	17	18	17	17	18	18						

Updated to match(es) played on 13 May 2023. Source: Worldfootball
A = Away; H = Home; W = Win; D = Draw; L = Loss

==== Matches ====
The league fixtures were announced on 20 January 2023.

18 February 2023 1	Renofa Yamaguchi	1–0	Omiya Ardija	Yamaguchi
13:00	Yajima 72'	Report		Stadium: Ishin Me-Life Stadium; Attendance: 4,596; Referee: Takao Nishiyama

26 February 2023 2	Renofa Yamaguchi	1–1	Júbilo Iwata	Yamaguchi
12:15		Report		Stadium: Ishin Me-Life Stadium

5 March 2023 3	Iwaki FC	0–1	Renofa Yamaguchi	Iwaki
12:00		Report		Stadium: Iwaki Greenfield Stadium

11 March 2023 4	Renofa Yamaguchi	1–3	Roasso Kumamoto	Yamaguchi
13:00		Report		Stadium: Ishin Me-Life Stadium

19 March 2023 5	Zweigen Kanazawa	5–2	Renofa Yamaguchi	Kanazawa
13:00		Report		Stadium: Ishikawa Athletics Stadium

26 March 2023 6	Renofa Yamaguchi	0–3	Fujieda MYFC	Yamaguchi
13:00		Report		Stadium: Ishin Me-Life Stadium

1 April 2023 7	Blaublitz Akita	0–1	Renofa Yamaguchi	Akita
13:00		Report		Stadium: Soyu Stadium; Attendance: 2,506; Referee: Yosuke Kubota

8 April 2023 8	Renofa Yamaguchi	1–1	Tochigi SC	Yamaguchi
13:00		Report		Stadium: Ishin Me-Life Stadium; Attendance: 2,831; Referee: Takafumi Mikuriya

12 April 2023 9	Oita Trinita	3–1	Renofa Yamaguchi	Ōita
18:00		Report		Stadium: Resonac Dome Oita; Referee: Koichiro Fukushima

16 April 2023 10	Renofa Yamaguchi	0–6	Shimizu S-Pulse	Yamaguchi
14:00		Report		Stadium: Ishin Me-Life Stadium

22 April 2023 11	Fagiano Okayama	1–1	Renofa Yamaguchi	Okayama
14:00		Report		Stadium: City Light Stadium

29 April 2023 12	Montedio Yamagata	1–1	Renofa Yamaguchi	Tendo
14:00		Report		Stadium: ND Soft Stadium Yamagata

3 May 2023 13	Renofa Yamaguchi	1–1	JEF United Chiba	Yamaguchi
14:00		Report		Stadium: Ishin Me-Life Stadium

7 May 2023 14	Thespakusatsu Gunma	2–1	Renofa Yamaguchi	Maebashi
14:00		Report		Stadium: Shoda Shoyu Stadium Gunma

13 May 2023 15	Renofa Yamaguchi	2–2	Tokushima Vortis	Yamaguchi
01:15	Ikegami 61'; Renan 88'	Report	Mori 27'; Kakitani 40'	Stadium: Ishin Me-Life Stadium; Attendance: 3,775; Referee: Koji Takasaki

17 May 2023 16	Machida Zelvia	v	Renofa Yamaguchi	Machida
19:00		Report		Stadium: Machida GION Stadium

21 May 2023 17	Renofa Yamaguchi	v	Tokyo Verdy	Yamaguchi
14:00		Report		Stadium: Ishin Me-Life Stadium

28 May 2023 18	Mito HollyHock	v	Renofa Yamaguchi	Mito
15:00		Report		Stadium: K's denki Stadium Mito

3 June 2023 19	Renofa Yamaguchi	v	V-Varen Nagasaki	Yamaguchi
14:00		Report		Stadium: Ishin Me-Life Stadium

11 June 2023 20	Ventforet Kofu	v	Renofa Yamaguchi	Kofu
16:00		Report		Stadium: JIT Recycle Ink Stadium

18 June 2023 21	Renofa Yamaguchi	v	Vegalta Sendai	Yamaguchi
14:00		Report		Stadium: Ishin Me-Life Stadium

24 June 2023 22	Tochigi SC	v	Renofa Yamaguchi	Utsunomiya
18:00		Report		Stadium: Tochigi Green Stadium

=== Emperor's Cup ===
7 June 2023 Second round	Mito HollyHock	v	Renofa Yamaguchi	Mito
19:00				Stadium: K's denki Stadium Mito
