= Yoneda =

Yoneda (よねだ, ヨネダ, 米田) is a Japanese surname. Notable people with the surname include:

- Isao Yoneda (米田 功, born 1977), gymnast
- Karl Yoneda (米田 剛三, Yoneda Gōzō, 1906–1999), Japanese-American activist and author
- Nobuo Yoneda (米田 信夫, 1930–1996), mathematician and computer scientist
- Shunya Yoneda (米田 隼也, born 1995), Japanese footballer
- Tetsuya Yoneda (米田 哲也, born 1938), baseball pitcher
