= Yū Hirakawa =

Japanese footballer (born 2001)

Yū Hirakawa 平河 悠
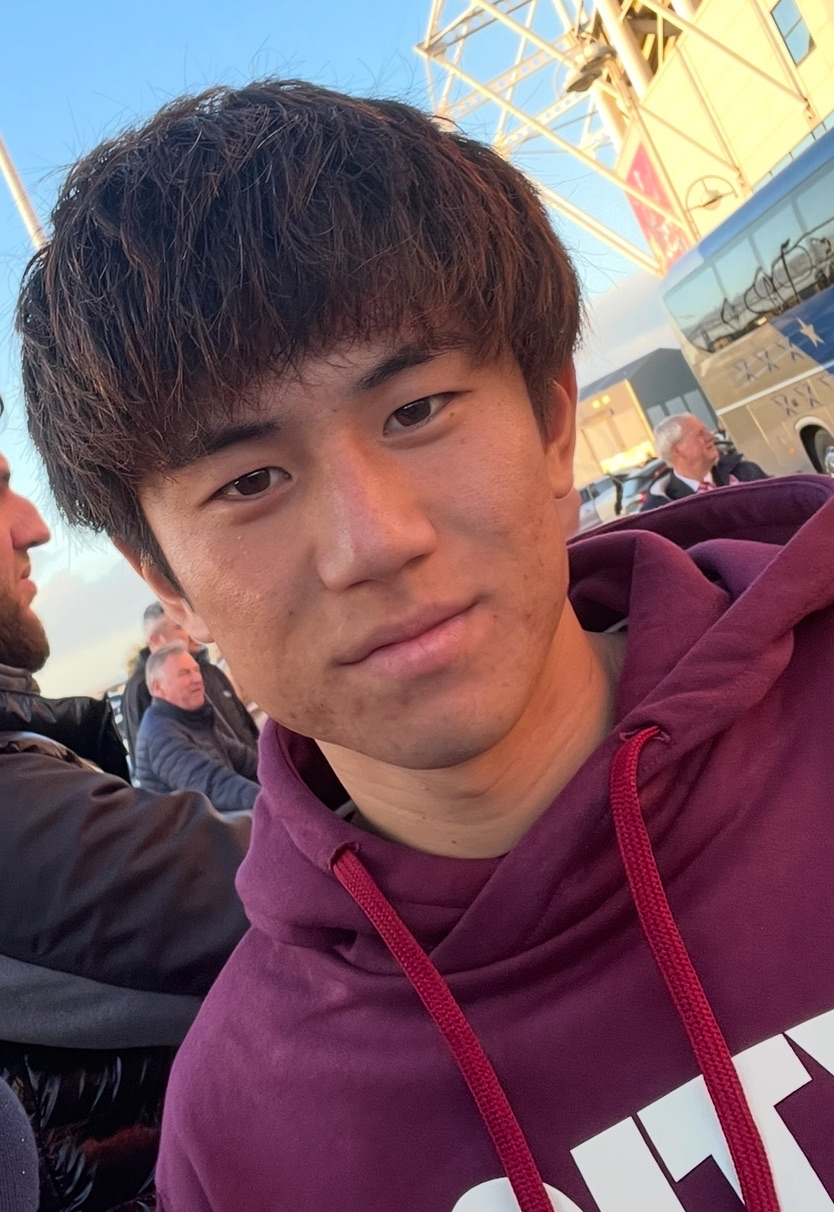
- Yū Hirakawa in 2024.

Personal information
- Full name: Yū Hirakawa
- Date of birth: 3 January 2001 (age 25)
- Place of birth: Kashima, Saga, Japan
- Height: 1.72 m (5 ft 8 in)
- Position: Forward

Team information
- Current team: Bristol City
- Number: 7

Youth career
- Meirin JSC
- –2015: FC Revona
- 2016–2018: Saga Higashi High School

College career
Years	Team	Apps	(Gls)
2019–2022	Yamanashi Gakuin University		

Senior career*
Years	Team	Apps	(Gls)
2021–2025	Machida Zelvia	70	(10)
2024–2025	→ Bristol City (loan)	36	(3)
2025–	Bristol City	26	(3)
2026	→ Hull City (loan)	7	(0)

International career^{‡}
2023	Japan U22	2	(0)
2023–	Japan U23	9	(1)
2025–	Japan	1	(0)
Medal record
Men's football
Representing Japan
AFC U-23 Asian Cup
Gold medal – first place	2024	Team
- * Club domestic league appearances and goals as of 17:40, 23 August 2026 (UTC) ‡ National team caps and goals as of 23:14, 5 June 2025 (UTC)

Yū Hirakawa (平河 悠, Hirakawa Yū; born 3 January 2001) is a Japanese footballer who plays as a forward for EFL Championship club Bristol City and the Japan national team.

== Early life ==
Hirakawa was born in Kashima, Saga. He played youth football for Meirin JSC, FC Revona and Saga Higashi High School. He played university football for Yamanashi Gakuin University.

== Career ==
=== Machida Zelvia ===
In September 2021, it was announced that Hirakawa would join J2 League club Machida Zelvia as a designated special player, whilst playing for the football team of Yamanashi Gakuin University. He made his debut for Machida on 5 December 2021 against Albirex Niigata. He scored his first goal for the club on 13 March 2022, scoring in the 20th minute against Fagiano Okayama. He was part of the Machida team that won the 2023 J2 League.

In April 2024, Hirakawa won his first Monthly MVP award for his performances at the start of the 2024 J1 League season.

=== Bristol City ===
On 9 July 2024, Hirakawa joined EFL Championship club Bristol City on a season-long loan.

On 24 February 2025, Hirakawa joined City on a permanent deal until June 2028. On 9 August, he made his debut for the club in a 4–1 win against Sheffield United in the league.

==== Hull City (loan) ====
On 19 January 2026, Hirakawa joined fellow Championship club Hull City on loan until the end of the season. He made his debut the following day, in the 3–0 win away to Preston North End.

On 23 May 2026, Hirakawa's deflected cross was converted by Oli McBurnie to secure promotion for Hull City to the Premier League.

== International career ==
On 4 April 2024, Hirakawa was called up to the Japan U23 squad for the 2024 AFC U-23 Asian Cup.

== Career statistics ==
=== Club ===
As of 05 September 2026

Appearances and goals by club, season and competition
Club	Season	League			National cup (Note: Includes Emperor's Cup, FA Cup)		League cup (Note: Includes J.League Cup, EFL Cup)		Other		Total	
Club	Season	Division	Apps	Goals	Apps	Goals	Apps	Goals	Apps	Goals	Apps	Goals
Machida Zelvia	2021	J2 League	1	0	0	0	—		—		1	0
Machida Zelvia	2022	J2 League	16	2	0	0	—		—		16	2
Machida Zelvia	2023	J2 League	35	6	2	2	—		—		37	8
Machida Zelvia	2024	J1 League	18	2	0	0	1	0	—		19	2
Machida Zelvia	Total		70	10	2	2	1	0	—		73	12
Bristol City	2024–25	EFL Championship	36	2	1	0	0	0	2 (Note: Appearances in EFL Championship play-offs)	0	39	2
Bristol City	2025-26	EFL Championship	24	1	1	0	2	1	-	-	27	2
Bristol City	2026-27	EFL Championship	5	1	-	-	1	0	—		6	1
Bristol City	Total		65	4	3	0	2	1	2	0	72	5
Hull City (loan)	2025–26	EFL Championship	7	0	1	0	—		2	0	10	0
Career total			142	14	6	2	3	1	4	0	155	17

== Honours ==
Machida Zelvia

- J2 League: 2023

Japan U23

- AFC U-23 Asian Cup: 2024

Hull City

- EFL Championship play-offs: 2026

Individual

- J1 League Monthly MVP: February/March 2024
