= Daisuke Matsumoto =

Daisuke Matsumoto may refer to:

- Daisuke Matsumoto (politician)
- Daisuke Matsumoto (footballer)
