= Toshiya Tanaka (footballer, born 1997) =

Japanese footballer

Toshiya Tanaka 田中 稔也
Personal information
- Full name: Toshiya Tanaka
- Date of birth: December 2, 1997 (age 28)
- Place of birth: Gunma, Japan
- Height: 1.75 m (5 ft 9 in)
- Position: Midfielder

Team information
- Current team: Kagoshima United
- Number: 73

Youth career
- Numata SC
- –2012: FC Krilo
- 2013–2015: Kashima Antlers

Senior career*
| Years | Team | Apps | (Gls) |
| 2016–2018 | Kashima Antlers | 4 | (0) |
| 2019–2022 | Thespakusatsu Gunma | 105 | (14) |
| 2023–2024 | Renofa Yamaguchi | 35 | (1) |
| 2025– | Kagoshima United | 30 | (3) |
Medal record
Kashima Antlers
| Winner | AFC Champions League | 2018 |
| Winner | J1 League | 2016 |
| Runner-up | J1 League | 2017 |
| Winner | Emperor's Cup | 2016 |
- * Club domestic league appearances and goals as of 1 January 2026

Toshiya Tanaka (田中 稔也, Tanaka Toshiya; born December 2, 1997) is a Japanese football player who plays as a midfielder for Kagoshima United.

== Career ==
Toshiya Tanaka joined J1 League club Kashima Antlers in 2016. On 5 June 2016, he made his debut in the J.League Cup against Omiya Ardija.

Tanaka signed with Thespakusatsu Gunma for the 2019 season. He made his league debut against SC Sagamihara on 17 March 2019. Tanaka scored his first league goal against Nagano Parceiro on 16 June 2019, scoring in the 90th+4th minute.

On 27 December 2022, Tanaka was announced at Renofa Yamaguchi. He made his league debut against Omiya Ardija on 18 February 2023.

On 16 December 2024, Tanaka was announced at Kagoshima United.

== Club statistics ==
Updated to 23 February 2018.

| Club performance | | | League | | Cup | | League Cup | | Continental | | Other | | Total | |
| Season | Club | League | Apps | Goals | Apps | Goals | Apps | Goals | Apps | Goals | Apps | Goals | Apps | Goals |
| Japan | | | League | | Emperor's Cup | | J. League Cup | | AFC | | Other^{1} | | Total | |
|---|---|---|---|---|---|---|---|---|---|---|---|---|---|---|
| 2016 | Kashima Antlers | J1 League | 0 | 0 | 0 | 0 | 1 | 0 | – | | 0 | 0 | 1 | 0 |
| 2016 | Kashima Antlers | J1 League | 0 | 0 | 1 | 1 | 0 | 0 | 0 | 0 | – | | 1 | 1 |
| Total | | | 0 | 0 | 1 | 1 | 1 | 0 | – | | 0 | 0 | 2 | 1 |

^{1}Includes Japanese Super Cup, J. League Championship and FIFA Club World Cup.
