= Jurato Ikeda =

Japanese footballer

Jurato Ikeda 池田 樹雷人
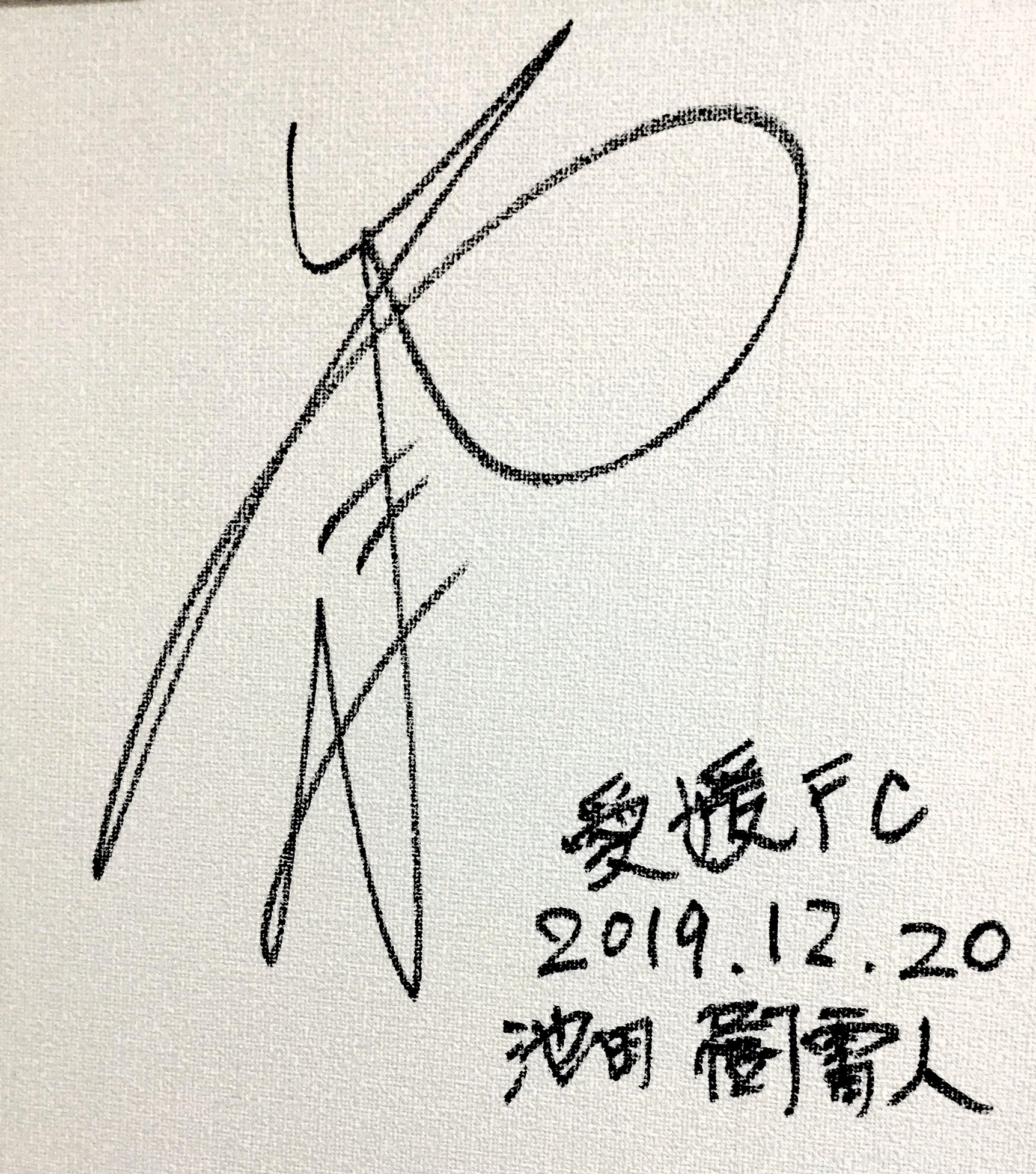

Personal information
- Full name: Jurato Ikeda
- Date of birth: 17 September 1996 (age 30)
- Place of birth: Higashimurayama, Tokyo, Japan
- Height: 1.87 m (6 ft 2 in)
- Position: Defender

Team information
- Current team: Kagoshima United
- Number: 36

Youth career
- Mitsubishi Yowa

Senior career*
Years	Team	Apps	(Gls)
2015–2017	Cerezo Osaka	0	(0)
2016	→ Cerezo Osaka U-23 (loan)	11	(0)
2017	→ Bangkok Glass (loan)	24	(0)
2018–2021	Ehime FC	37	(2)
2019	→ AC Nagano Parceiro	8	(0)
2022	Blaublitz Akita	34	(2)
2023–2025	FC Machida Zelvia	23	(1)
2024	→ Avispa Fukuoka (loan)	1	(0)
2025–2026	Avispa Fukuoka	2	(0)
2026–	Kagoshima United	0	(0)
- * Club domestic league appearances and goals as of 21:47, 6 August 2026 (UTC)

Jurato Ikeda (池田 樹雷人, Ikeda, Jurato; born 17 September 1996 in Tokyo) is a Japanese footballer who plays as a defender for J3 League club Kagoshima United.

== Club statistics ==
As of 6 August 2026.

Appearances and goals by club, season and competition
Club	Season	League			National cup (Note: Includes Emperors Cup and Thai FA Cup)		League cup (Note: Includes J.League Cup)		Total	
Club	Season	Division	Apps	Goals	Apps	Goals	Apps	Goals	Apps	Goals
Cerezo Osaka	2015	J2 League	0	0	–		–		0	0
Cerezo Osaka U-23 (loan)	2016	J3 League	11	0	–		–		11	0
Bangkok Glass (loan)	2017	Thai League 1	24	0	2	1	–		26	1
Ehime FC	2018	J2 League	7	1	1	0	–		8	1
Ehime FC	2020	J2 League	10	1	0	0	–		10	1
Ehime FC	2021	J2 League	20	0	1	0	–		21	0
Ehime FC	Total		37	2	2	0	0	0	39	2
AC Nagano Parceiro (loan)	2019	J3 League	8	0	–		–		8	0
Blaublitz Akita	2022	J2 League	34	2	–		–		34	2
Machida Zelvia	2023	J2 League	23	1	1	0	0	0	24	1
Machida Zelvia	2024	J1 League	0	0	1	0	4	0	5	0
Machida Zelvia	Total		23	1	2	0	4	0	29	1
Avispa Fukuoka (loan)	2024	J1 League	1	0	–		–		1	0
Avispa Fukuoka	2025	J1 League	2	0	–		–		2	0
Career total			140	5	6	1	4	0	150	6
