= Ratko Stevović =

Montenegrin football manager (born 1956)

Personal information
- Full name: Ratko Stevović
- Date of birth: 24 October 1956 (age 70)
- Place of birth: Nikšić, FPR Yugoslavia

Managerial career
- Years: Team
- 1987–1989: Zmaj Zemun
- 1991–1992: Mitsubishi Motors
- 1992–1994: Toho Titanium
- 1995–1997: Liaison Kusatsu
- 2000–2001: Thespa Kusatsu
- 2002–2003: Greece Premier League
- 2006–2007: Mornar
- 2011–2012: Bratstvo Cijevna
- 2012–2013: Bokelj
- 2014: Berane
- 2016: Iskra Danilovgrad

Ratko Stevović (born 24 October 1956) is a Montenegrin football manager.

== Managerial career ==
=== Zmaj Zemun ===
Head coach of the Zmaj Zemun youth from 1987 to 1989.

=== Mitsubishi Motors ===
Head coach of the Mitsubishi Motors from 1991 to 1992.

=== Tohoch Titan ===
Head coach of the Toho Titanium from 1992 to 1994.

=== Liaison Kusatsu ===
Head coach of the Liaison Kusatsu from 1995 to 1997.

=== Thespa Kusatsu ===
Head coach of the Thespa Kusatsu from 2000 to 2001.

=== Greece Premier League ===
Head coach in the Greece Premier League from 2002 to 2003.

=== Mornar ===
Head coach of the FK Mornar from 2006 to 2007.

=== Bratstvo ===
Head coach of the FK Bratstvo Cijevna from 2011 to 2012.

=== Bokelj ===
Head coach of the FK Bokelj from 2012 to 2013.

=== Berane ===
Head coach of the FK Berane from 2014.

=== Iskra ===
Head coach of the FK Iskra Danilovgrad from 2016.
