= William Popp (footballer) =

Japanese footballer (born 1994)

William Popp ポープ・ウィリアム
Personal information
- Full name: William Popp
- Date of birth: 21 October 1994 (age 32)
- Place of birth: Hino, Tokyo, Japan
- Height: 1.91 m (6 ft 3 in)
- Position: Goalkeeper

Team information
- Current team: Beerschot (on loan from Shonan Bellmare)
- Number: 13

Youth career
- 2002–2006: Ohwada SC
- 2007–2012: Tokyo Verdy

Senior career*
Years	Team	Apps	(Gls)
2013–2017	Tokyo Verdy	1	(0)
2016	→ FC Gifu (loan)	4	(0)
2017	→ Kawasaki Frontale (loan)	0	(0)
2018–2020	Kawasaki Frontale	0	(0)
2019	→ Oita Trinita (loan)	0	(0)
2020	→ Fagiano Okayama (loan)	40	(0)
2021	Oita Trinita	14	(0)
2022–2023	Machida Zelvia	48	(0)
2024–2025	Yokohama F. Marinos	10	(0)
2025–	Shonan Bellmare	7	(0)
2026–	→ Beerschot (loan)	0	(0)

International career
2014	Japan U23	1	(0)
Medal record
Kawasaki Frontale
Winner	J1 League	2017
Winner	J1 League	2018
Runner-up	J.League Cup	2017
- * Club domestic league appearances and goals as of 19 April 2026

William Popp (ポープ・ウィリアム, Pōpu Uiriamu; born 21 October 1994) is a Japanese professional footballer who plays as a goalkeeper for Belgian club Beerschot, J1 League club Shonan Bellmare.

== Career ==
On 30 December 2021, Popp officially transferred to J2 club Machida Zelvia for the 2022 season.

Popp was a key player in helping Machida Zelvia gain promotion to the J1 League in the 2023 season. In January 2024, it was announced that Popp would be joining Yokohama F. Marinos.

On 10 February 2026, Popp joined Belgian Challenger Pro League side Beerschot on a loan-deal until the end of the season.

== Personal life ==
Popp was born in Japan; his father is American while his mother is Japanese.

== Career statistics ==
=== Club ===
Updated to the end of 2023 season.

Club performance			League		Cup		League Cup		Total	
Season	Club	League	Apps	Goals	Apps	Goals	Apps	Goals	Apps	Goals
Japan			League		Emperor's Cup		Emperor's Cup		Total	
2013	Tokyo Verdy	J2 League	0	0	0	0	–		0	0
2014	Tokyo Verdy	J2 League	1	0	0	0	–		1	0
2015	Tokyo Verdy	J2 League	0	0	0	0	–		0	0
2016	FC Gifu	J2 League	4	0	0	0	–		4	0
2017	Kawasaki Frontale	J1 League	0	0	0	0	0	0	0	0
2018	Kawasaki Frontale	J1 League	0	0	0	0	0	0	0	0
2019	Oita Trinita	J1 League	0	0	2	0	4	0	6	0
2020	Fagiano Okayama	J2 League	40	0	0	0	0	0	40	0
2021	Oita Trinita	J1 League	14	0	1	0	4	0	19	0
2022	Machida Zelvia	J2 League	17	0	0	0	0	0	17	0
2023	Machida Zelvia	J2 League	31	0	0	0	0	0	31	0
Career total			107	0	3	0	8	0	118	0

== Honours ==
Kawasaki Frontale

- J1 League: 2017, 2018

Machida Zelvia

- J2 League: 2023
