= Joji Ikegami =

Japanese footballer (born 1994)

Joji Ikegami 池上 丈二
Personal information
- Full name: Joji Ikegami
- Date of birth: November 6, 1994 (age 32)
- Place of birth: Nagasu, Kumamoto, Japan
- Height: 1.65 m (5 ft 5 in)
- Position: Midfielder

Team information
- Current team: Renofa Yamaguchi
- Number: 10

Youth career
- Baleia SC
- Kunimi High School
- –2012: Aomori Yamada High School

College career
Years	Team	Apps	(Gls)
2013–2016	Osaka University of H&SS		

Senior career*
Years	Team	Apps	(Gls)
2017–	Renofa Yamaguchi	226	(17)
- * Club domestic league appearances and goals as of 1 January 2026

Joji Ikegami (池上 丈二, Ikegami Joji; born November 6, 1994) is a Japanese football player who plays for Renofa Yamaguchi.

== Career ==
Joji Ikegami joined J2 League club Renofa Yamaguchi in 2017.

== Club statistics ==
Updated to end of 2018 season.

Club performance			League		Cup		Total	
Season	Club	League	Apps	Goals	Apps	Goals	Apps	Goals
Japan			League		Emperor's Cup		Total	
2017	Renofa Yamaguchi	J2 League	20	1	1	0	21	1
2018	Renofa Yamaguchi	J2 League	20	0	1	0	21	0
Total			40	1	2	0	42	1
