= Dudu (footballer, born 21 April 1990) =

Brazilian footballer

Personal information
- Full name: Luiz Eduardo dos Santos Gonzaga
- Date of birth: April 21, 1990 (age 36)
- Place of birth: Itanhaém, Brazil
- Height: 1.88 m (6 ft 2 in)
- Position: Forward

Team information
- Current team: FC Gifu
- Number: 9

Senior career*
Years	Team	Apps	(Gls)
2011	Batatais	0	(0)
2011	Ferroviária		
2011	Barretos		
2012–2013	Mogi Mirim	9	(0)
2013	→ Linense (loan)	15	(0)
2013	Bragantino	20	(1)
2014–2016	Figueirense	42	(7)
2014	→ Kashiwa Reysol (loan)	14	(5)
2016–2020	Ventforet Kofu	94	(26)
2018	→ Avispa Fukuoka (loan)	36	(10)
2021–2022	Machida Zelvia	56	(12)
2023	FC Imabari	16	(8)
2023–2024	JEF United Chiba	46	(13)
2025–	FC Gifu	21	(1)
- * Club domestic league appearances and goals as of 1 January 2026

Luiz Eduardo dos Santos Gonzaga (born 21 April 1990), commonly known as Dudu (ドゥドゥ), is a Brazilian footballer who plays as a forward. He currently play for FC Gifu.

== Career ==
In August 2014, he signed for Kashiwa Reysol in J. League Division 1.

On 6 January 2023, Dudu signed to J3 club, FC Imabari for upcoming 2023 season.

== Career statistics ==
As of the start from 2023 season.

=== Club ===
Club performance			League		Cup		League Cup		Total	
Season	Club	League	Apps	Goals	Apps	Goals	Apps	Goals	Apps	Goals
Japan			League		Emperor's Cup		J. League Cup		Total	
2014	Kashiwa Reysol (loan)	J1 League	14	5	0	0	2	0	16	5
2016	Ventforet Kofu	J1 League	11	4	1	0	–		12	4
2017	Ventforet Kofu	J1 League	29	5	0	0	1	0	30	5
2019	Ventforet Kofu	J2 League	27	7	0	0	0	0	27	7
2020	Ventforet Kofu	J2 League	27	10	0	0	0	0	27	10
2018	Avispa Fukuoka (loan)	J2 League	36	10	1	0	–		37	10
2021	Machida Zelvia	J2 League	27	4	0	0	–		27	4
2022	Machida Zelvia	J2 League	29	8	1	0	–		30	8
2023	FC Imabari	J3 League	16	8	1	0	–		17	8
2023	JEF United Chiba	J2 League	2	1	–		–		2	1
Career total			218	62	5	0	3	0	226	62
