= Renan (footballer, born 1996) =

Brazilian footballer

Personal information
- Full name: Renan dos Santos Paixao
- Date of birth: July 28, 1996 (age 30)
- Place of birth: São Paulo, Brazil
- Height: 1.83 m (6 ft 0 in)
- Position: Defender

Team information
- Current team: Kagoshima United
- Number: 27

Senior career*
Years	Team	Apps	(Gls)
2011–2013	Red Bull Bragantino II		
2014–2016	Palmeiras		
2016	→ Joseense (loan)	6	(0)
2017	→ Monte Azul (loan)	10	(0)
2018–2024	Renofa Yamaguchi	159	(8)
2025–	Kagoshima United	10	(0)
- * Club domestic league appearances and goals as of 1 January 2026

Renan dos Santos Paixao (born July 28, 1996) is a Brazilian football player who plays as a defender and currently play for Kagoshima United.

== Career ==
Renan made his league debut for Joseense against Sertãozinho on 6 February 2016.

Renan made his league debut for Monte Azul against Joseense on 29 January 2017. He scored his first league goal against CA Taboão da Serra on 8 April 2017, scoring in the 60th minute.

On 26 February 2018, Renan was announced at Renofa Yamaguchi. He made his league debut against Zweigen Kanazawa on 21 March 2018. Renan scored his first league goal against FC Ryukyu on 18 July 2020, scoring in the 57th minute. On 16 November 2024, it was announced that the club would not be renewing his contract for the 2025 season. Renan left the club with 159 league appearances and 8 goals.

On 27 December 2024, Renan was announced at Kagoshima United.

== Career statistics (Japan only) ==
=== Club ===
As of the start from 2025 season.

Club performance			League		Cup		League Cup		Total	
Season	Club	League	Apps	Goals	Apps	Goals	Apps	Goals	Apps	Goals
Japan			League		Cup		League Cup		Total	
2018	Renofa Yamaguchi	J2 League	20	0	1	0	–		21	0
2019	Renofa Yamaguchi	J2 League	1	0	0	0	–		1	0
2020	Renofa Yamaguchi	J2 League	31	4	–		–		31	4
2021	Renofa Yamaguchi	J2 League	22	1	–		–		22	1
2022	Renofa Yamaguchi	J2 League	25	0	1	0	–		26	0
2023	Renofa Yamaguchi	J2 League	28	1	–		–		28	1
2024	Renofa Yamaguchi	J2 League	32	2	1	0	1	0	34	2
2025	Kagoshima United	J3 League	0	0	0	0	0	0	0	0
Career Total			159	8	3	0	1	0	163	8
