= Kaili Shimbo =

Japanese footballer (born 2002)

Kaili Ali Shimbo
Personal information
- Date of birth: 16 August 2002 (age 24)
- Place of birth: Tokyo, Japan
- Height: 1.73 m (5 ft 8 in)
- Position: Winger

Team information
- Current team: Yokohama FC
- Number: 48

Youth career
- –2017: Kashiwa Reysol
- 2018–2020: Cerezo Osaka

Senior career*
Years	Team	Apps	(Gls)
2020	Cerezo Osaka U-23	23	(1)
2021–2024	Renofa Yamaguchi	40	(1)
2022	→ Tegevajaro Miyazaki (loan)	27	(1)
2023	→ Iwate Grulla Morioka (loan)	37	(1)
2025–	Yokohama FC	54	(0)
- * Club domestic league appearances and goals as of 14 August 2026

Kaili Shimbo (新保 海鈴, Shimbo Kaili; born 16 August 2002) is a Japanese footballer currently playing as a winger for Yokohama FC. He is the son of the former Japanese international defender, Hayuma Tanaka and Japan-Lebanese fashion model, Malia.

== Career statistics ==
=== Club ===
As of 6 March 2021.

Club	Season	League			National Cup		League Cup		Other		Total	
Club	Season	Division	Apps	Goals	Apps	Goals	Apps	Goals	Apps	Goals	Apps	Goals
Cerezo Osaka U-23	2020	J3 League	23	1	–		–		0	0	23	1
Renofa Yamaguchi	2021	J2 League	1	0	0	0	0	0	0	0	1	0
Career total			24	1	0	0	0	0	0	0	24	1
