= Riku Kamigaki =

Japanese footballer

Personal information
- Date of birth: 14 July 1998 (age 28)
- Place of birth: Gunma, Japan
- Height: 1.78 m (5 ft 10 in)
- Position: Midfielder

Team information
- Current team: Thespa Gunma
- Number: 8

Youth career
- –2013: Maebashi FC
- 2014–2016: Shoshi High School

College career
Years	Team	Apps	(Gls)
2017–2020	Toin University of Yokohama		

Senior career*
Years	Team	Apps	(Gls)
2019	Toin University of Yokohama FC	2	(0)
2021–2024	Renofa Yamaguchi	81	(1)
2024–2025	Nara Club	68	(4)
2026–	Thespa Gunma	12	(0)
- * Club domestic league appearances and goals as of 25 August 2026

Riku Kamigaki (神垣 陸, Kamigaki Riku; born 14 July 1998) is a Japanese footballer currently playing as a midfielder for Thespa Gunma.

== Career statistics ==
=== Club ===
As of 13 March 2021.

Club	Season	League			National Cup		League Cup		Other		Total	
Club	Season	Division	Apps	Goals	Apps	Goals	Apps	Goals	Apps	Goals	Apps	Goals
Toin University of Yokohama FC	2019	Kantō Soccer League	2	0	0	0	–		0	0	2	0
Toin University of Yokohama	2020	–			2 (Note: Appearances in the Emperor's Cup)	0	–		0	0	2	0
Renofa Yamaguchi	2021	J2 League	1	0	0	0	0	0	0	0	1	0
Career total			3	0	2	0	0	0	0	0	5	0
