= Junya Suzuki (footballer, born January 1996) =

Japanese footballer

Junya Suzuki 鈴木 準弥
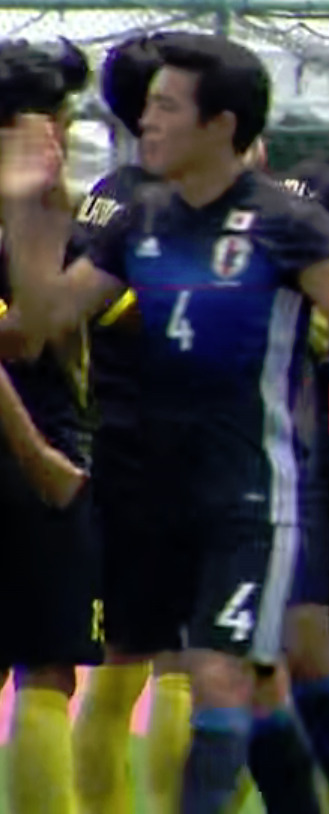

Personal information
- Date of birth: 7 January 1996 (age 30)
- Place of birth: Numazu, Shizuoka, Japan
- Height: 1.76 m (5 ft 9 in)
- Position: Right-back

Team information
- Current team: Renofa Yamaguchi FC (on loan from Yokohama FC)
- Number: 43

Youth career
- –2013: Shimizu S-Pulse

College career
Years	Team	Apps	(Gls)
2014–2017	Waseda University		

Senior career*
Years	Team	Apps	(Gls)
2018	VfR Aalen	2	(0)
2019	Fujieda MYFC	29	(3)
2020–2021	Blaublitz Akita	53	(3)
2021–2023	FC Tokyo	13	(0)
2023–2024	Machida Zelvia	41	(2)
2025–	Yokohama FC	22	(0)
2026–	→ Renofa Yamaguchi FC (loan)	2	(0)

International career
2012–2013	Japan U16/U17		
Medal record
Men's football
Representing Japan
Summer Universiade
Gold medal – first place	2017 Taipei	Japan
- * Club domestic league appearances and goals as of 21 August 2026

Junya Suzuki (鈴木 準弥, Suzuki Junya; born 7 January 1996) is a Japanese footballer who plays as a right-back for Renofa Yamaguchi FC, on loan from J2 League club Yokohama FC.

== Career ==
Suzuki signed for Fujieda MYFC on 10 December 2018.

On 11 July 2023, Suzuki signed to J2 club, Machida Zelvia for mid 2023 season. After the transfer, he played in 17 games. The club also won the J2 League champions and was promoted to J1 League for the first time in their history from next season.

On 17 December 2024, Suzuki was announce official transfer to J1 promoted club, Yokohama FC from 2025 season.

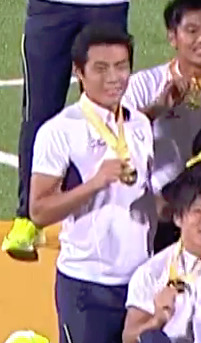
Universiade Gold Medalist Suzuki

== Career statistics ==
=== Club ===
As of the start for 2025 season

Appearances and goals by club, season and competition
Club	Season	League			National cup (Note: Includes DFB-Pokal, Emperor's Cup.)		League cup (Note: Includes J. League Cup.)		Continental		Total	
Club	Season	Division	Apps	Goals	Apps	Goals	Apps	Goals	Apps	Goals	Apps	Goals
VfR Aalen	2017-18	3. Liga	2	0	–		–		–		2	0
Waseda University	2016											
Fujieda MYFC	2019	J3 League	29	3	–		–		–		29	3
Blaublitz Akita	2020	J3 League	33	2	2	0	–		–		35	2
Blaublitz Akita	2021	J2 League	20	1	1	0	–		–		21	1
FC Tokyo	2021	J1 League	8	0	0	0	2	0	–		10	0
FC Tokyo	2022	J1 League	4	0	5	0	0	0	–		9	0
FC Tokyo	2023	J1 League	1	0	1	0	2	0	–		4	0
Machida Zelvia	2023	J2 League	17	1	–		–		–		17	1
Machida Zelvia	2024	J1 League	24	1	1	0	2	0	–		27	1
Yokohama FC	2025	J1 League	0	0	0	0	0	0	–		0	0
Career total			126	8	11	0	6	0	0	0	143	8

== Honours ==
Blaublitz Akita

- J3 League: 2020

Machida Zelvia

- J2 League: 2023
