= Masayuki Okuyama =

Japanese footballer

Masayuki Okuyama 奧山 政幸
Personal information
- Full name: Masayuki Okuyama
- Date of birth: 28 July 1993 (age 33)
- Place of birth: Toyota, Aichi, Japan
- Height: 1.73 m (5 ft 8 in)
- Position: Defender

Team information
- Current team: Vegalta Sendai
- Number: 3

Youth career
- –2011: Nagoya Grampus

College career
Years	Team	Apps	(Gls)
2012–2015	Waseda University		

Senior career*
Years	Team	Apps	(Gls)
2016	Renofa Yamaguchi FC	5	(0)
2017–2024	FC Machida Zelvia	264	(6)
2024–	Vegalta Sendai	49	(0)
- * Club domestic league appearances and goals as of 17 August 2026

Masayuki Okuyama (奧山 政幸, Okuyama, Masayuki; born 28 July 1993 in Toyota, Aichi) is a Japanese footballer who plays for J2 League club Vegalta Sendai.

== Club statistics ==
As of 4 October 2026.

Appearances and goals by club, season and competition
Club	Season	League			National cup (Note: Includes Emperor's Cup)		League cup (Note: Includes J.League Cup)		Other		Total	
Club	Season	Division	Apps	Goals	Apps	Goals	Apps	Goals	Apps	Goals	Apps	Goals
Renofa Yamaguchi	2016	J2 League	5	0	1	0	–		–		6	0
Machida Zelvia	2017	J2 League	25	0	1	0	0	0	–		26	0
Machida Zelvia	2018	J2 League	40	0	2	0	0	0	–		42	0
Machida Zelvia	2019	J2 League	42	0	0	0	0	0	–		42	0
Machida Zelvia	2020	J2 League	41	1	0	0	0	0	–		41	1
Machida Zelvia	2021	J2 League	38	2	0	0	0	0	–		38	2
Machida Zelvia	2022	J2 League	40	2	1	0	0	0	–		41	2
Machida Zelvia	2023	J2 League	34	1	1	0	0	0	–		35	1
Machida Zelvia	2024	J1 League	4	0	1	0	3	0	–		8	0
Machida Zelvia	Total		264	6	6	0	3	0	0	0	273	6
Vegalta Sendai	2024	J2 League	10	0	0	0	0	0	2 (Note: Appearance in J1/J2 play-offs)	0	12	0
Vegalta Sendai	2025	J2 League	24	0	0	0	1	0	0	0	25	0
Vegalta Sendai	2026	J2/J3 (100)	10	0	–		–		0	0	10	0
Vegalta Sendai	2026–27	J2 League	5	0	0	0	0	0	0	0	5	0
Vegalta Sendai	Total		49	0	0	0	1	0	2	0	52	0
Career total			318	6	7	0	4	0	2	0	331	6
