= Juanma (footballer, born 1990) =

Spanish footballer

Personal information
- Full name: Juan Manuel Delgado Lloria
- Date of birth: 17 November 1990 (age 35)
- Place of birth: Valencia, Spain
- Height: 1.88 m (6 ft 2 in)
- Position: Forward

Team information
- Current team: Kagoshima United
- Number: 99

Youth career
- 2006–2009: Levante

Senior career*
Years	Team	Apps	(Gls)
2009–2011	Jove Español	41	(8)
2011–2012	Dénia	26	(2)
2012–2013	Alavés	23	(7)
2013–2014	Asteras Tripolis	30	(5)
2014–2015	Kalloni	26	(7)
2015–2017	Hearts	33	(12)
2016–2017	→ UCAM Murcia (loan)	10	(2)
2017–2018	V-Varen Nagasaki	63	(17)
2019	Omiya Ardija	40	(13)
2020–2022	Avispa Fukuoka	92	(17)
2023–2025	V-Varen Nagasaki	89	(43)
2026–	Kagoshima United	1	(0)
- * Club domestic league appearances and goals as of 07:57, 4 September 2026 (UTC)

Juan Manuel Delgado Lloria (Spanish pronunciation: [ˈxwam maˈnwel delˈɣaðo ˈʎoɾja]; born 17 November 1990), commonly known as Juanma [ˈxwamma], is a Spanish professional footballer who plays as a forward for J3 League club Kagoshima United.

He spent the vast majority of his career in Spain in the lower leagues, his Segunda División input consisting of ten matches with UCAM Murcia. He represented clubs in Greece (Asteras Tripolis and Kalloni), Scotland (Heart of Midlothian) and Japan (V-Varen Nagasaki, Omiya Ardija, Avispa Fukuoka and Kagoshima United).

== Career ==
=== Early career ===
Born in Valencia, Juanma started out at Jove Español San Vicente in the Tercera División. He then moved to Segunda División B, where he represented Dénia and Alavés. He scored and was sent off – after having already been replaced – in his competitive debut for the latter on 17 October 2012, a 2–1 away win against Huracán Valencia in the third round of the Copa del Rey.

=== Greece ===
In the summer of 2013, Juanma joined Greek club Asteras Tripolis. He played his first game as a professional on 15 September of that year, featuring six minutes in a 1–1 Super League draw at OFI Crete. His first goal came on 12 January 2014, when he contributed to a 3–0 home victory over Platanias.

After featuring in 36 games in all competitions and leaving by mutual consent, Juanma spent the 2014–15 season with Kalloni in the same league. He scored his first goal for his new team on 9 November 2014, in a 2–0 away defeat of Panionios. He netted twice on 9 February of the following year, helping to a 2–2 home draw against Skoda Xanthi and an eventual 11th-place finish; subsequently, he signed a new contract.

=== Hearts ===
Juanma signed for Heart of Midlothian on a three-year deal in June 2015, with Kalloni being entitled to 20% of any future transfer. On 2 August, in his Scottish Premiership debut, he capitalised on a Brad McKay mistake to score the opener at home against St Johnstone, in an eventual 4–3 win. Six days later, in a 2–1 victory at Dundee, he netted twice in five minutes, starting with a penalty. On 19 December, against the same opponent, he received a straight red card in a goalless draw for headbutting David Wotherspoon, and manager Robbie Neilson attributed it to frustration at Scottish referees being more lenient on fouls against strikers than their Spanish counterparts.

On 31 August 2016, Juanma was loaned to UCAM Murcia for one year, making his professional debut in the Spanish league system on 21 September when he came on as a 35th-minute substitute and scored once in a 4–0 home win over Almería in the Segunda División.

=== Japan ===
Juanma agreed to a permanent contract with Japanese club V-Varen Nagasaki in January 2017. He spent the following years in the same country (in both the J2 League and the J1 League), with Omiya Ardija and Avispa Fukuoka.

On 14 December 2022, the 32-year-old Juanma returned to V-Varen. In the first season of his second spell, he scored a career-best 26 goals to lead all players in that department; he achieved top-flight promotion at the end of his third.

Juanma moved to J3 League side Kagoshima United on 6 August 2026.

== Career statistics ==
As of 24 August 2025

Appearances and goals by club, season and competition
Club	Season	League			National cup		League cup		Continental		Other		Total	
Club	Season	Division	Apps	Goals	Apps	Goals	Apps	Goals	Apps	Goals	Apps	Goals	Apps	Goals
Jove Español	2009–10	Tercera División	16	3	—		—		—		—		16	3
Jove Español	2010–11	Tercera División	25	5	—		—		—		—		25	5
Jove Español	Total		41	8	—		—		—		—		41	8
Dénia	2011–12	Segunda División B	26	2	0	0	—		—		—		26	2
Alavés	2012–13	Segunda División B	23	7	1	1	—		—		4 (Note: Appearances in Segunda División B play-offs)	0	28	8
Asteras Tripolis	2013–14	Super League Greece	30	5	4	0	—		2 (Note: Appearances in UEFA Europa League)	0	—		36	5
Kalloni	2014–15	Super League Greece	26	7	0	0	—		—		—		26	7
Hearts	2015–16	Scottish Premiership	33	12	6	1	—		—		—		39	13
Hearts	2016–17	Scottish Premiership	0	0	0	0	—		4	0	—		4	0
Hearts	Total		33	12	6	1	—		4	0	—		43	13
UCAM Murcia (loan)	2016–17	Segunda División	10	2	3	0	—		—		—		13	2
V-Varen Nagasaki	2017	J2 League	32	11	0	0	—		—		—		32	11
V-Varen Nagasaki	2018	J1 League	31	6	1	0	1	1	—		—		33	7
V-Varen Nagasaki	Total		63	17	1	0	1	1	—		—		65	18
Omiya Ardija	2019	J2 League	40	13	1	0	—		—		1 (Note: Appearances in J2 League play-offs)	0	42	13
Avispa Fukuoka	2020	J2 League	34	8	—		—		—		—		34	8
Avispa Fukuoka	2021	J1 League	27	5	2	0	3	1	—		—		32	6
Avispa Fukuoka	2022	J1 League	31	4	1	1	11	3	—		—		43	8
Avispa Fukuoka	Total		92	17	3	1	14	4	—		—		151	35
V-Varen Nagasaki	2023	J2 League	36	26	0	0	—		—		—		36	26
V-Varen Nagasaki	2024	J2 League	34	10	3	4	5	2	—		—		42	16
V-Varen Nagasaki	2025	J2 League	19	7	1	0	0	0	—		—		20	7
Career total			473	133	23	7	20	7	6	0	5	0	527	147

== Honours ==
Individual

- J2 League top scorer: 2023
- J2 League Best XI: 2023
