= Erik (footballer, born 1994) =

Brazilian footballer

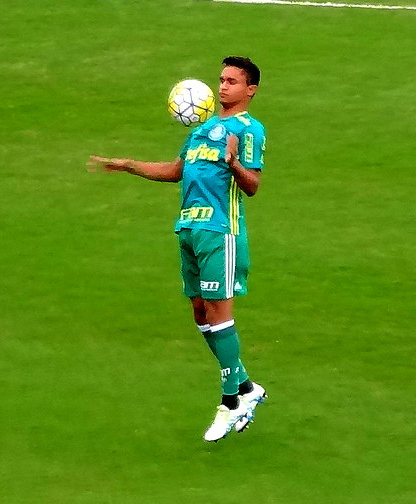
- Erik warming up for Palmeiras in 2016

Personal information
- Full name: Erik Nascimento de Lima
- Date of birth: 18 July 1994 (age 32)
- Place of birth: Novo Repartimento, Pará, Brazil
- Height: 1.70 m (5 ft 7 in)
- Position: Forward

Team information
- Current team: Vissel Kobe
- Number: 94

Youth career
- 2004–2014: Goiás

Senior career*
Years	Team	Apps	(Gls)
2013–2015	Goiás	64	(22)
2016–2021	Palmeiras	25	(3)
2018	→ Atlético Mineiro (loan)	5	(0)
2018–2019	→ Botafogo (loan)	27	(6)
2019–2020	→ Yokohama F. Marinos (loan)	41	(21)
2021–2022	Changchun Yatai	48	(15)
2023–2026	Machida Zelvia	74	(29)
2025	→ Vissel Kobe (loan)	29	(9)
2026–	Vissel Kobe	2	(1)

International career
2013	Brazil U20	1	(1)
2015	Brazil U23	2	(0)
Medal record
Representing Brazil
Men's Football
Pan American Games
Bronze medal – third place	2015 Toronto	Team
- * Club domestic league appearances and goals as of 12:06, 7 October 2026 (UTC)

Erik Nascimento de Lima (born 18 July 1994), simply known as Erik, is a Brazilian professional footballer who plays as a forward for J1 League club Vissel Kobe.

He began his career at Goiás in 2013, scoring 36 goals in 103 matches across all competitions and winning the Best Newcomer Award in the 2014 Campeonato Brasileiro Série A. In 2015, he transferred to Palmeiras for €3 million.

== Club career ==
=== Goiás ===
Born in Novo Repartimento, Pará, Erik joined Goiás's youth setup in 2004, aged 10, after impressing on a trial when visiting family in Goiânia. In February 2013, after impressing with the under-20s in Copa São Paulo de Futebol Júnior, he was promoted to the main squad.

On 7 March 2013, Erik renewed his link with the Esmeraldino, signing until December 2016. He made his senior debut on the 27th, coming on as a second-half substitute for David in a 2–0 home win against CRAC for the Campeonato Goiano championship; he appeared in only one further match in the competition, as his side finished second.

On 7 July 2013, Erik made his Série A debut, starting in a 1–0 home win against Vitória. He only appeared rarely during the campaign, with his side finishing in an unexpected sixth position.

Erik scored his first goal as a senior on 26 February 2014, netting the first in a 2–1 home win against Anápolis. He subsequently overtook veteran Araújo and Rychely during the year.

Erik started the first league game of the campaign, a 1–0 away win against Atlético Mineiro on 4 May. He scored his first goal in the competition on the 23rd, netting the last in a 2–2 home draw against Santos, and subsequently was an ever-present figure for the club, scoring a hat-trick against Atlético Paranaense on 31 August, and also adding braces against Bahia and Chapecoense. After finishing the campaign with 12 goals, he was named Best Newcomer.

After being strongly linked to a move, Erik remained with Goiás for 2015. In the year's Goiano he scored two braces, against Atlético Goianiense and Grêmio Anápolis, as his team won the state title. In the year's national tournament, Erik recorded 10 goals from 26 games, including two-goal hauls in 3–0 wins over São Paulo, Vasco da Gama and Joinville in the middle of the campaign; the latter two teams were relegated alongside Goiás.

=== Palmeiras ===
Amid interest from Turkey's Fenerbahçe, Erik signed a five-year contract for Palmeiras on 23 December 2015; the Verdão purchased 60% of his economic rights for a fee of €3 million.

He made his debut on 19 January in the first match of the new Campeonato Paulista season, replacing Gabriel Jesus for the final 16 minutes of a 2–0 win at Botafogo (SP). Regularly a substitute, he did not score in his first campaign. His national league debut came on 29 May, again in place of Gabriel Jesus in a 1–0 loss at city rivals São Paulo. In his next game, a start on 4 July, he scored his first Palmeiras goal in his 14th game, opening a 3–1 win at Sport Recife.

On 14 December 2017, Atlético Mineiro announced the acquisition of Erik on a year-long loan deal for the 2018 season. However, after a string of poor performances, he was demoted to the reserve team. Subsequently, he left the side and joined Botafogo on loan on 17 August for the remainder of the season.

=== Asia ===
On 26 July 2019, Erik moved abroad for the first time when he joined Yokohama F. Marinos of Japan's J1 League on an 18-month loan.

Erik joined Chinese Super League club Changchun Yatai in mid-2021 season.

On 1 January 2023, Erik returned to Japan for the first time in three years and signed for J2 League club Machida Zelvia for the upcoming season.

== International career ==
On 8 May 2013, Erik was called up to Brazil under-20 team, for the year's Toulon Tournament. A backup to Giovanni and Vinícius Araújo, he only appeared against Nigeria on 4 June, scoring the first in a 1–1 draw; his side was eventually crowned champions shortly after.

On 6 March 2015, Erik was called up to the under-23s, making his debut in a 4–1 home routing over Paraguay on 27 March.

== Career statistics ==
=== Club ===
As of 7 October 2026.

Appearances and goals by club, season and competition
Club	Season	League			State League		National cup		League cup		Continental		Other		Total	
Club	Season	Division	Apps	Goals	Apps	Goals	Apps	Goals	Apps	Goals	Apps	Goals	Apps	Goals	Apps	Goals
Goiás	2013	Série A	4	0	2	0	2	0	—		—		—		8	0
Goiás	2014	Série A	34	12	8	2	1	0	—		4 (Note: Appearance(s) in Copa Sudamericana)	3	—		47	17
Goiás	2015	Série A	26	10	16	6	5	3	—		1	0	—		48	19
Goiás	Total		64	22	26	8	8	3	—		5	3	—		103	36
Palmeiras	2016	Série A	16	3	10	0	2	0	—		2 (Note: Appearance(s) in Copa Libertadores)	0	—		30	3
Palmeiras	2017	Série A	9	0	4	0	1	0	—		0	0	—		14	0
Palmeiras	Total		25	3	14	0	3	0	—		2	0	—		44	3
Atlético Mineiro (loan)	2018	Série A	5	0	12	0	6	2	—		2	0	—		25	2
Botafogo (loan)	2018	Série A	17	5	—		—		—		—		—		17	5
Botafogo (loan)	2019	Série A	10	1	10	1	4	3	—		5	4	—		29	9
Botafogo (loan)	Total		27	6	10	1	4	3	—		5	4	—		46	14
Yokohama F. Marinos (loan)	2019	J1 League	12	8	—		1	1	0	0	—		—		13	9
Yokohama F. Marinos (loan)	2020	J1 League	29	13	—		—		2	0	3 (Note: Appearance(s) in AFC Champions League)	1	1 (Note: Appearance(s) in Japanese Super Cup)	1	35	15
Yokohama F. Marinos (loan)	Total		41	21	—		1	1	2	0	3	1	1	1	48	24
Changchun Yatai	2021	Chinese Super League	22	7	—		2	1	—		—		—		24	8
Changchun Yatai	2022	Chinese Super League	26	8	—		0	0	—		—		—		26	8
Changchun Yatai	Total		48	15	—		2	1	—		—		—		50	16
Machida Zelvia	2023	J2 League	30	18	—		0	0	—		—		—		30	18
Machida Zelvia	2024	J1 League	26	3	—		1	0	5	1	—		—		32	4
Machida Zelvia	2026	J1 (100)	18	8	—		—		—		3 (Note: Appearance(s) in AFC Champions League Elite)	0	—		21	8
Machida Zelvia	Total		74	29	—		1	0	5	1	3	0	—		83	30
Vissel Kobe (loan)	2025	J1 League	29	9	—		4	2	2	0	4	1	—		39	11
Vissel Kobe	2026–27	J1 League	2	1	—		1	1	0	0	1	0	–		4	2
Career total			315	106	62	9	30	13	9	1	23	9	1	1	440	138

== Honours ==
Palmeiras

- Campeonato Brasileiro Série A: 2016

Yokohama F. Marinos

- J1 League: 2019

Machida Zelvia

- J2 League: 2023
- AFC Champions League Elite runner-up: 2025–26

Brazil U20

- Toulon Tournament: 2013

Individual

- Campeonato Brasileiro Série A Best Newcomer: 2014
- J2 League Best XI: 2023
