= Yuta Koide =

Japanese footballer (born 1994)

Yuta Koide 小出 悠太
Personal information
- Full name: Yuta Koide
- Date of birth: October 20, 1994 (age 32)
- Place of birth: Chiba, Japan
- Height: 1.78 m (5 ft 10 in)
- Position: Centre back

Team information
- Current team: Ventforet Kofu
- Number: 22

Youth career
- –2006: Ichinomiya Wings FC
- 2007–2009: JEF United Chiba
- 2010–2012: Ichiritsu Funabashi High School

College career
Years	Team	Apps	(Gls)
2013–2016	Meiji University		

Senior career*
Years	Team	Apps	(Gls)
2017–2019	Ventforet Kofu	79	(1)
2020–2022	Oita Trinita	48	(1)
2023-2024	Vegalta Sendai	67	(0)
2025–	Ventforet Kofu	27	(0)
- * Club domestic league appearances and goals as of 17 August 2026

Yuta Koide (小出 悠太, Koide Yuta; born October 20, 1994) is a Japanese football player. He plays for Ventforet Kofu.

== Club statistics ==
Updated to 17 November 2022.

Club	Season	League			National Cup		League Cup		Other^{1}		Total	
Club	Season	Division	Apps	Goals	Apps	Goals	Apps	Goals	Apps	Goals	Apps	Goals
Meiji University	2016	ー			1	0	ー		ー		1	0
Ventforet Kofu	2017	J1 League	10	0	1	0	1	0	ー		12	0
Ventforet Kofu	2018	J2 League	33	1	1	0	6	0	ー		40	1
Ventforet Kofu	2019	J2 League	36	0	1	0	ー		1	0	38	0
Ventforet Kofu	Total		79	1	4	0	7	0	1	0	91	1
Oita Trinita	2020	J1 League	14	0	ー		0	0	ー		14	0
Oita Trinita	2021	J1 League	24	1	4	0	4	0	ー		32	1
Oita Trinita	2022	J2 League	10	0	2	0	5	1	1	0	18	1
Oita Trinita	Total		48	1	6	0	9	1	1	0	64	2
Vegalta Sendai	2023	J2 League	ー	ー	ー	ー	ー		ー		ー	ー
Vegalta Sendai	Total		ー	ー	ー	ー	ー	ー	ー	ー	ー	ー
Career total			127	2	10	0	16	1	2	0	155	3
