= Reoto Kodama =

Japanese footballer (born 2002)

Reoto Kodama 兒玉 澪王斗
Personal information
- Date of birth: 24 April 2002 (age 24)
- Place of birth: Kagoshima, Japan
- Height: 1.78 m (5 ft 10 in)
- Position: Winger

Team information
- Current team: Fafe
- Number: 9

Youth career
- –2020: Sagan Tosu

Senior career*
Years	Team	Apps	(Gls)
2020–2023	Sagan Tosu	0	(0)
2021–2022	→ Sagamihara (loan)	16	(2)
2022	→ Renofa Yamaguchi (loan)	22	(1)
2023	→ Suzuka PG (loan)	12	(2)
2023–	Fafe	42	(3)
- * Club domestic league appearances and goals as of 25 June 2025

Reoto Kodama (兒玉 澪王斗, Kodama Reoto; born 24 April 2002) is a Japanese professional footballer who plays as a winger for Portuguese Liga 3 club AD Fafe.

== Career ==
On 18 January 2023, Kodama was loaned to JFL club Suzuka Point Getters ahead of the 2023 season.

On 29 August 2023, Sagan Tosu announced that Kodama's loan at Suzuka Point Getters had been cancelled and that he would join Portuguese Liga 3 side AD Fafe on a permanent deal. Later that day, Fafe confirmed the transfer, announcing the player had signed a one-year contract.

== Career statistics ==
=== Club ===
As of match played 23 July 2023.

Club	Season	League			National cup		League cup		Total	
Club	Season	Division	Apps	Goals	Apps	Goals	Apps	Goals	Apps	Goals
Sagan Tosu	2020	J1 League	0	0	0	0	1	0	1	0
Sagan Tosu	2021	J1 League	0	0	0	0	4	0	4	0
Sagan Tosu	Total		0	0	0	0	5	0	5	0
Sagamihara (loan)	2021	J2 League	16	2	0	0	—		16	2
Renofa Yamaguchi (loan)	2022	J2 League	22	1	0	0	—		22	1
Suzuka PG (loan)	2023	JFL	12	2	0	0	—		12	2
Fafe	2023–24	Liga 3	0	0	0	0	—		0	0
Career total			50	5	0	0	5	0	55	5
