= Akira Fantini =

Japanese footballer (born 1998)

Akira Fantini ファンティーニ 燦
Personal information
- Date of birth: 24 May 1998 (age 28)
- Place of birth: Ichikawa, Chiba, Japan
- Height: 1.82 m (6 ft 0 in)
- Position: Goalkeeper

Team information
- Current team: Kyoto Sanga
- Number: 36

Youth career
- 2010–2016: Cesena

Senior career*
Years	Team	Apps	(Gls)
2016–2017	Cesena	0	(0)
2017–2018	Sagan Tosu	0	(0)
2020–2024	Fukushima United	21	(0)
2022	→ Renofa Yamaguchi (loan)	0	(0)
2024–	Kyoto Sanga	0	(0)
- * Club domestic league appearances and goals as of 01:07, 30 August 2023 (UTC)

Akira Fantini (ファンティーニ 燦, Fantini Akira; born 24 May 1998) is a Japanese professional footballer who plays as a goalkeeper for Kyoto Sanga FC.

== Career ==
On 11 January 2023, Fantini returned to Fukushima United for the upcoming 2023 season after a loan at Renofa Yamaguchi, during a season which he did not play for the club.

== Personal life ==
Fantini was born in Ichikawa, Chiba to an Italian father and Japanese mother.

== Career statistics ==
=== Club ===
As of the start from 2023 season.

Club	Season	League			National Cup		League Cup		Other		Total	
Club	Season	Division	Apps	Goals	Apps	Goals	Apps	Goals	Apps	Goals	Apps	Goals
Fukushima United	2020	J3 League	19	0	0	0	–		0	0	19	0
Fukushima United	2021	J3 League	2	0	0	0	–		0	0	2	0
2021	0	0	0	0	–		0	0	0	0		
Renofa Yamaguchi (loan)	2022	J2 League	0	0	0	0	–		0	0	0	0
Career total			21	0	0	0	0	0	0	0	21	0
