= Hijiri Onaga =

Japanese footballer

Hijiri Onaga 翁長 聖
Personal information
- Full name: Hijiri Onaga
- Date of birth: February 23, 1995 (age 31)
- Place of birth: Hyogo, Japan
- Height: 1.71 m (5 ft 7 1/2 in)
- Position: Midfielder

Team information
- Current team: V-Varen Nagasaki
- Number: 22

Youth career
- Kakogawa Kanno SC
- Kanno SC
- 2010–2012: Teikyo Daisan High School

College career
Years	Team	Apps	(Gls)
2013–2016	Chuo University		

Senior career*
Years	Team	Apps	(Gls)
2017–2019	V-Varen Nagasaki	96	(6)
2020–2021	Omiya Ardija	60	(2)
2022–2023	FC Machida Zelvia	81	(3)
2024–2025	Tokyo Verdy	61	(4)
2025–	V-Varen Nagasaki	36	(2)
- * Club domestic league appearances and goals as of 11 August 2026

Hijiri Onaga (翁長 聖, Onaga Hijiri; born February 23, 1995) is a Japanese football player. He plays for V-Varen Nagasaki.

== Career ==
Hijiri Onaga joined J2 League club V-Varen Nagasaki in 2017. After three seasons, he joined Omiya Ardija.

== Career statistics ==
Updated to 1 January 2020.

Appearances and goals by club, season and competition
Club	Season	League			Emperor's Cup		J.League Cup		Total	
Club	Season	Division	Apps	Goals	Apps	Goals	Apps	Goals	Apps	Goals
V-Varen Nagasaki	2017	J2 League	38	4	0	0	—		38	4
V-Varen Nagasaki	2018	J1 League	34	2	2	0	0	0	36	2
V-Varen Nagasaki	2019	J2 League	24	0	4	0	7	1	35	1
Career total			96	6	6	0	7	1	109	7
