= Jang Min-gyu =

South Korean footballer (born 1999)

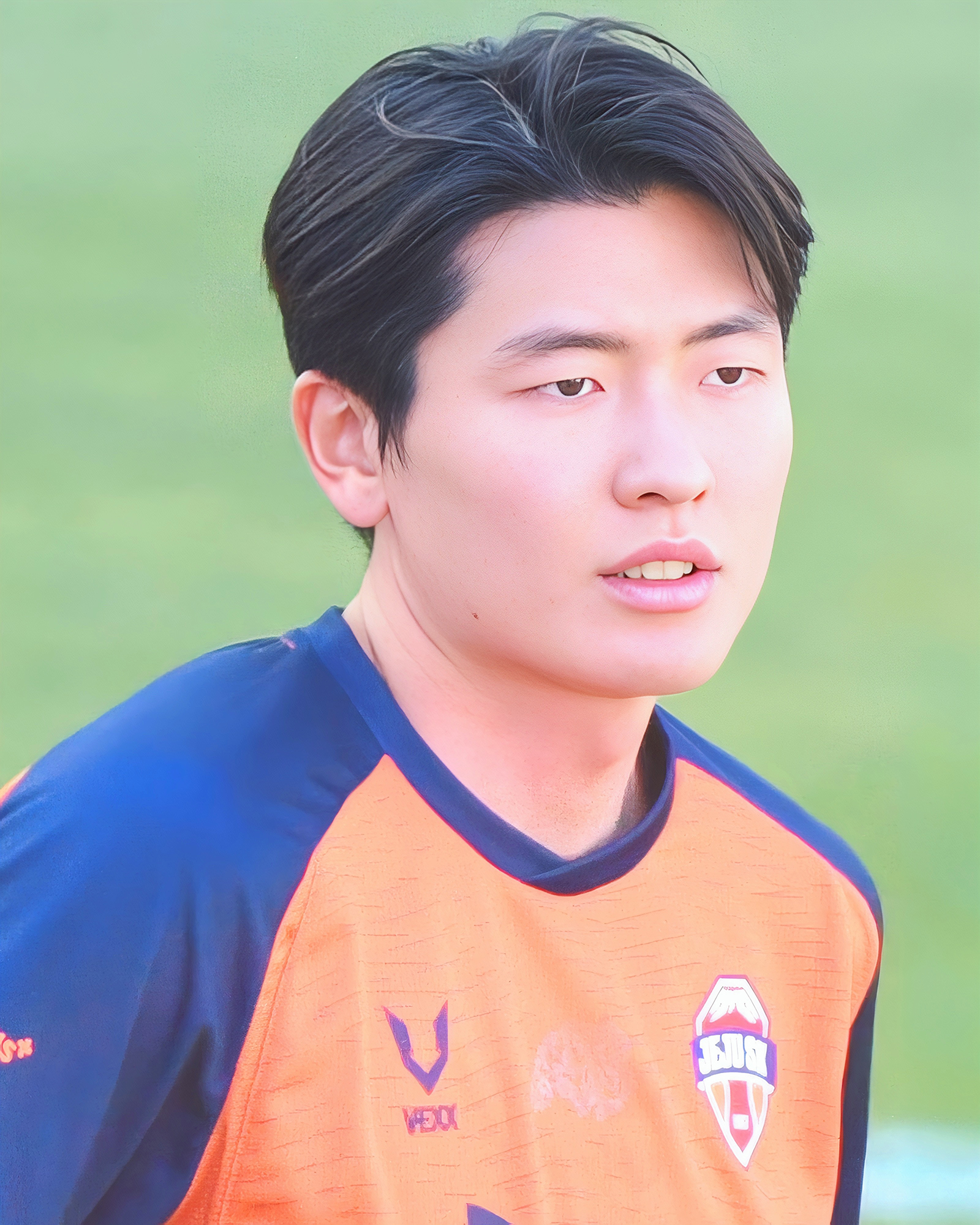
- Jang in 2026

Personal information
- Date of birth: 6 March 1999 (age 27)
- Place of birth: Gangseo District, Seoul, South Korea
- Height: 1.85 m (6 ft 1 in)
- Position: Defender

Team information
- Current team: Jeju SK
- Number: 20

Youth career
- 2015–2017: Bupyeong High School

College career
Years	Team	Apps	(Gls)
2018–2019	Hanyang University		

Senior career*
Years	Team	Apps	(Gls)
2020–2022	JEF United Chiba	101	(3)
2023–2024	Machida Zelvia	53	(4)
2025–	Jeju SK	53	(1)
Korean name
Hangul	장민규
Hanja	張敏圭
RR	Jang Mingyu
MR	Chang Min'gyu
- * Club domestic league appearances and goals as of 3 August 2026

Jang Min-gyu (Korean: 장민규; born 6 March 1999) is a South Korean footballer who plays as a defender and currently plays for K League 1 club, Jeju SK.

== Career ==
Jang Min-gyu was born in Gangseo District, Seoul. Jang Min-gyu begin first youth career with Bupyeong High School, when entered to Hanyang University. In 2019, he was selected for the first time to the South Korea national under-23 football team, which is aiming to qualify for the 2020 Olympics in Tokyo.

On 18 December 2019, Jang Min-gyu was abroad to Japan for the first time and begin first professional career with JEF United Chiba from the 2020 season. He leave from the club in 2022 after three years at Chiba. On 7 December 2022, Jang Min-gyu officially transfer to J2 club, Machida Zelvia for upcoming 2023 season. On 8 January 2025, Machida announce that would be leaving the team to complete procedures and preparations for transferring to an overseas club. Eight days later in same year, Jang Min-gyu announcement officially return to South Korea and transfer to K League 1 club, Jeju SK for the 2025 season.

== Career statistics ==
=== Club ===
As of the end 2025 season.

Club	Season	League			National Cup		League Cup		Other		Total	
Club	Season	Division	Apps	Goals	Apps	Goals	Apps	Goals	Apps	Goals	Apps	Goals
Hanyang University	2018	–			1	0	–				1	0
Hanyang University	Total		–		1	0	–				1	0
JEF United Chiba	2020	J2 League	31	0	0	0	0	0	0	0	31	0
JEF United Chiba	2021	J2 League	36	1	2	1	0	0	0	0	38	2
JEF United Chiba	2022	J2 League	34	2	1	0	0	0	0	0	35	2
JEF United Chiba	Total		101	3	3	1	0	0	0	0	104	4
Machida Zelvia	2023	J2 League	37	4	1	0	0	0	0	0	38	4
Machida Zelvia	2024	J1 League	16	0	1	0	0	0	0	0	17	0
Machida Zelvia	Total		53	4	2	0	0	0	0	0	55	4
Jeju SK	2025	K League 1	31	0	1	0	–		6 (Note: Includes K League 1 Final Round B and Relegation Play-off.)	0	38	0
Jeju SK	Total		31	0	1	0	–		6	0	38	0
Career total			185	7	7	1	0	0	6	0	198	8

== Honours ==
Machida Zelvia

- J2 League: 2023
