= Nedeljko Stojišić =

Serbian association football player

Personal information
- Date of birth: 25 September 1997 (age 29)
- Place of birth: Belgrade, FR Yugoslavia
- Height: 2.02 m (6 ft 8 in)
- Position: Goalkeeper

Team information
- Current team: OFK Beograd
- Number: 97

Youth career
- –2016: Voždovac
- 2016–2018: BASK
- 2018–2020: Portimonense

Senior career*
Years	Team	Apps	(Gls)
2018–2020	Portimonense	0	(0)
2021–2022	Vegalta Sendai	8	(0)
2023	Machida Zelvia	0	(0)
2024–	OFK Beograd	2	(0)
- * Club domestic league appearances and goals as of 12 June 2026

Nedeljko Stojišić (Serbian Cyrillic: Недељко Стојишић; born 25 September 1997) is a Serbian footballer who plays as a goalkeeper for OFK Beograd.

== Career ==
Stojišić started his career in the youth academies of Voždovac and BASK. He signed his first professional contract in July 2018 with Portuguese club Portimonense in the Primeira Liga. He made 35 appearances for the club's under-23 team, leaving the club after the expiry of his contract in July 2020. On 20 January 2021, he signed with Japanese club Vegalta Sendai in the J1 League. He made his professional debut on 20 June 2021 against Kashima Antlers in a 1–1 draw.

On 9 January 2023, he moved to J2 League side Machida Zelvia. He left the club at the end of the season without having made an appearance.

On 13 September 2024, he signed with Serbian SuperLiga club OFK Beograd.

== Career statistics ==
As of 2023 season.

Club	Season	League			National Cup		League Cup		Other		Total	
Club	Season	Division	Apps	Goals	Apps	Goals	Apps	Goals	Apps	Goals	Apps	Goals
Vegalta Sendai	2021	J1 League	1	0	0	0	1 (Note: Appearances in the J.League Cup)	0	—		2	0
Vegalta Sendai	2022	J2 League	7	0	0	0	—		—		7	0
Machida Zelvia	2023	J2 League	0	0	0	0	—		—		0	0
Career total			8	0	0	0	1	0	0	0	9	0

== Honours ==
Machida Zelvia

- J2 League: 2023
