= Shunya Yoneda =

Japanese footballer

Personal information
- Date of birth: 5 November 1995 (age 31)
- Place of birth: Fukuoka, Japan
- Height: 1.73 m (5 ft 8 in)
- Position: Left winger

Team information
- Current team: V-Varen Nagasaki
- Number: 23

Youth career
- Nakai SSS
- –2010: FC.Neo
- 2011–2013: Shizuoka Gakuen High School

College career
Years	Team	Apps	(Gls)
2014–2017	Juntendo University		

Senior career*
Years	Team	Apps	(Gls)
2018–	V-Varen Nagasaki	246	(17)
- * Club domestic league appearances and goals as of 11 August 2026

Shunya Yoneda (米田 隼也, Yoneda Shun'ya; born 5 November 1995) is a Japanese professional footballer who plays as a left winger for V-Varen Nagasaki.
