= Daisuke Matsumoto (footballer) =

Japanese footballer

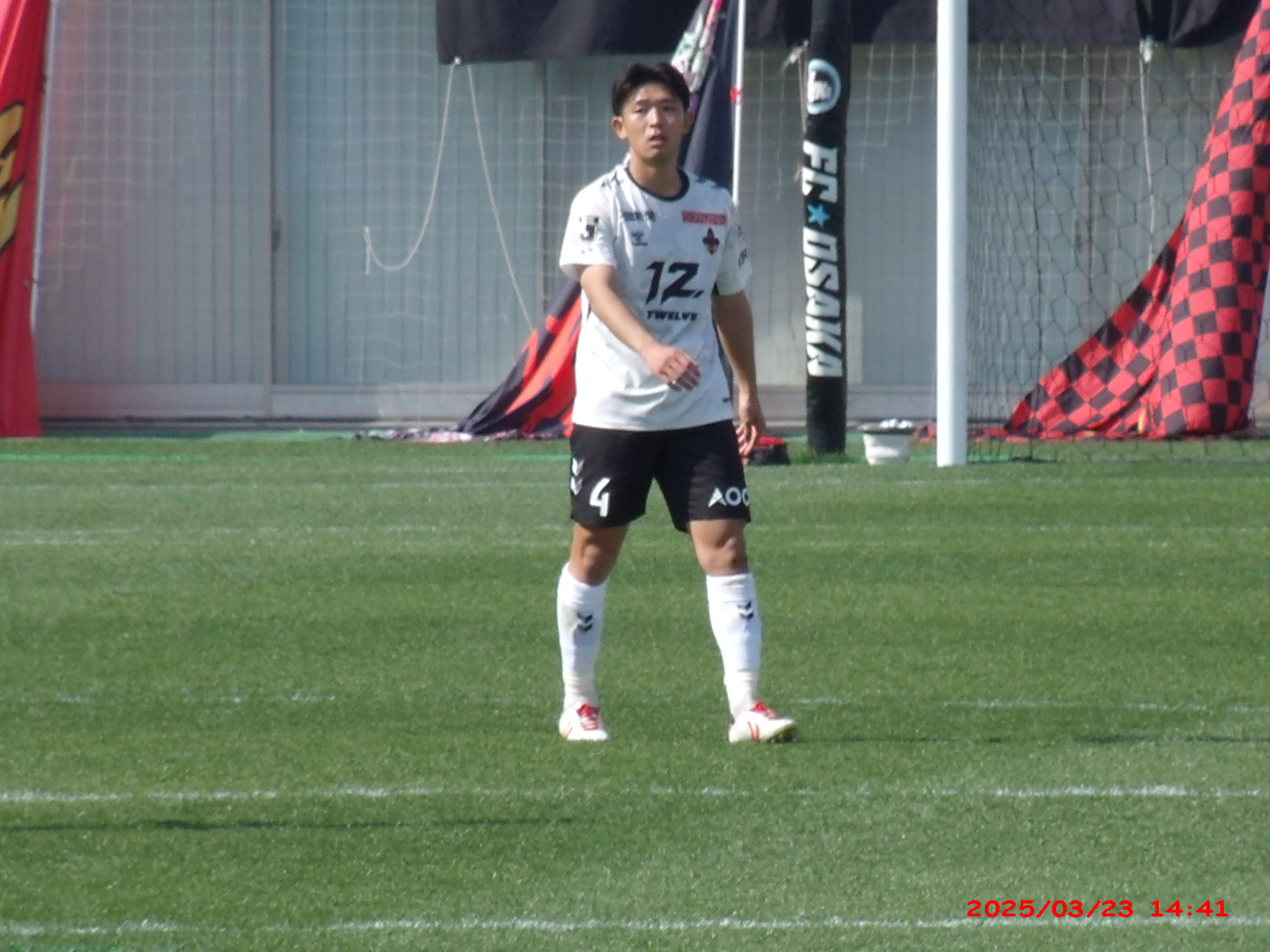

Personal information
- Date of birth: 10 September 1998 (age 28)
- Height: 1.83 m (6 ft 0 in)
- Position: Centre back

Team information
- Current team: Zweigen Kanazawa
- Number: 55

Youth career
- Minowa West FC
- 2014–2016: Teikyo Daisan High School

College career
Years	Team	Apps	(Gls)
2017–2020	Chuo University		

Senior career*
Years	Team	Apps	(Gls)
2020–2021	Sagan Tosu	2	(0)
2022	Zweigen Kanazawa	20	(0)
2023	Renofa Yamaguchi FC	14	(0)
2023-2024	FC Machida Zelvia	4	(0)
2025-	Zweigen Kanazawa	47	(2)
- * Club domestic league appearances and goals as of 21 August 2026

Daisuke Matsumoto (松本 大輔, Matsumoto Daisuke; born 10 September 1998) is a Japanese footballer currently playing as a centre back for Zweigen Kanazawa.

== Career statistics ==
=== Club ===
As of 3 March 2021.

Club	Season	League			National Cup		League Cup		Other		Total	
Club	Season	Division	Apps	Goals	Apps	Goals	Apps	Goals	Apps	Goals	Apps	Goals
Sagan Tosu	2020	J1 League	0	0	0	0	0	0	0	0	0	0
Sagan Tosu	2021	J1 League	0	0	0	0	1 (Note: Appearances in the J.League Cup)	0	0	0	1	0
Career total			0	0	0	0	1	0	0	0	1	0
