= Thespa Gunma =

Japanese football club

Thespa Gunma ザスパ群馬
- Nicknames: Thespa (ザスパ, Zasupa)
- Founded: 1995; 31 years ago (as Liaison Kusatsu)
- Ground: Shoda Shoyu Stadium Gunma; Maebashi, Gunma
- Capacity: 15,253
- Owner: Kusatsu Onsen Football Club
- Chairman: Hajime Hosogai
- Manager: Mitsumasa Yoda
- League: J3 League
- 2025: J3 League, 14th of 20
- Website: thespa.co.jp
Home colours	Away colours

Thespa Gunma (ザスパ群馬, Zasupa Gunma), formerly Thespakusatsu Gunma (ザスパクサツ群馬, Zasupakusatsu Gunma) is a professional football (soccer) club based in Maebashi, Gunma Prefecture in Japan. The club currently play in the J3 League, the third tier of Japanese professional football.

== History ==
The club was founded in 1995 in Kusatsu, one of the most well-known spa resorts in Japan, as Liaison Kusatsu Football Club. The players were students of the specialized training college Higashi Nihon Soccer Academy. When the school closed in 1999 due to financial difficulties, the players decided to stay in Kusatsu and keep the club alive. In 2002, the club was incorporated as K.K. Kusatsu Onsen Football Club with a future promotion to the J. League in mind and adopted the new team name Thespa Kusatsu (ザスパ草津, zasupa kusatsu), meaning "The Spa, Kusatsu".

Because of J. League restrictions on stadiums, they play at Shoda Shoyu Stadium Gunma (Shikishima Athletics Stadium) in nearby Maebashi, the prefectural capital since the club were promoted to J. League Division 2 in the 2005 season.

From 1 February 2013, the club adopted the new name "Thespakusatsu Gunma", to give the impression of the club as a representative of the entire Gunma Prefecture, while still leaving the name "Kusatsu" in it, as well as the logo of the club as it is.

After 12 years spent in the J2 League, Thespakusatsu Gunma were relegated to the J3 League for the first time in their history, having finished in last place in the 2017 J2 League. Gunma returned to the J2 League ahead of the 2020 season after being promoted back to J2 after two years spent in J3.

On 5 October 2023, Thespakusatsu Gunma announced officially, a change of name and logo to Thespa Gunma commencing from the 2024 season, dropping the "Kusatsu" which was included in the name since 2005.

On 29 September 2024, Thespa Gunma were officially relegated to J3 for the second time in their history, for the 2025 season after a defeat by Roasso Kumamoto 2–3 at home, which ended four years in second tier with five games remaining.

== Stadium and training ground ==
The home stadium is Shoda Shoyu Stadium Gunma, Maebashi, Gunma. The capacity of the stadium is 15,253. The training ground is GCC The Park in Maebashi.

== Record as J. League member ==
Champions	Runners-up	Third place	Promoted	Relegated

League													J. League Cup	Emperor's Cup
Season	Div.	Teams	Pos.	P	W	D	L	F	A	GD	Pts	Attendance/G	J. League Cup	Emperor's Cup
As Thespa Kusatsu
2004	JFL	16	3rd	30	19	5	6	63	35	28	62	4,948	Not eligible	Quartferfinals
2005	J2	12	12th	44	5	8	31	26	82	-56	23	3,959	Not eligible	4th round
2006	J2	13	12th	48	9	15	24	54	86	-32	42	3,736	Not eligible	4th round
2007	J2	13	11th	48	7	21	20	42	71	-29	42	3,808	Not eligible	4th round
2008	J2	15	9th	42	13	14	15	45	52	-7	53	4,215	Not eligible	3rd round
2009	J2	18	10th	51	18	11	22	64	76	-12	65	4,330	Not eligible	3rd round
2010	J2	19	12th	36	14	6	16	36	48	-12	48	4,424	Not eligible	2nd round
2011	J2	20	9th	38	16	9	13	51	51	0	57	3,211	Not eligible	2nd round
2012	J2	22	17th	42	12	11	19	31	15	-14	47	3,341	Not eligible	2nd round
As Thespakusatsu Gunma
2013	J2	22	20th	42	9	13	20	43	61	-18	40	3,571	Not eligible	2nd round
2014	J2	22	18th	42	14	7	21	45	54	-9	49	3,689	Not eligible	4th round
2015	J2	22	18th	42	13	9	20	34	56	-22	48	4,099	Not eligible	1st round
2016	J2	22	17th	42	11	12	19	52	66	-14	45	4,744	Not eligible	2nd round
2017	J2	22	22nd	42	5	5	32	32	88	-56	20	3,832	Not eligible	3rd round
2018	J3	17	5th	32	15	7	10	37	35	2	52	3,346	Not eligible	2nd round
2019	J3	18	2nd	34	18	9	7	59	34	25	63	3,594	Not eligible	2nd round
2020 †	J2	22	20th	42	15	4	23	40	62	-22	49	1,709	Not eligible	Did not qualify
2021 †	J2	22	18th	42	9	14	19	35	56	-21	41	2,082	Not eligible	4th round
2022	J2	22	20th	42	11	9	22	36	57	-21	42	3,076	Not eligible	Round of 16
2023	J2	22	11th	42	14	15	13	44	44	0	57	4,116	Not eligible	2nd round
As Thespa Gunma
2024	J2	20	20th	38	3	9	26	24	62	-38	18	3,988	2nd round	2nd round
2025	J3	20	14th	38	12	10	16	56	59	-3	46	3,555	1st round	2nd round
2026	J3	40	24th	18	6	4	8	26	36	-10	23	3,424	N/A	N/A
2026–27	J3	20	TBD	38									TBD	TBD

Key

- Pos. = Position in league; P = Games played; W = Games won; D = Games drawn; L = Games lost; F = Goals scored; A = Goals conceded; GD = Goals difference; Pts = Points gained
- Attendance/G = Average home league attendance
- † 2020 & 2021 seasons attendances reduced by COVID-19 worldwide pandemic
- Source: J. League Data Site

== Honours ==
Thespa Gunma honours
Honour	No.	Years	Notes
Gunma Prefecture Division 4	1	1995	as Liaison Kusatsu
Gunma Prefecture Division 3	1	1996	as Liaison Kusatsu
Gunma Prefecture 2nd Division A	1	1997	as Liaison Kusatsu
Gunma Prefecture Division 2 B	1	2001	as Liaison Kusatsu
Gunma Prefecture Division 1	1	2002	as Thespa Kusatsu
Kantō Division 2	1	2003	as Thespa Kusatsu
Gunma Prefectural Football Association President's Cup Soccer Tournament	4	2003, 2018, 2019, 2025	as Thespa Kusatsu

== Current squad ==
As of 1 August 2026

Note: Flags indicate national team as defined under FIFA eligibility rules; some limited exceptions apply. Players may hold more than one non-FIFA nationality.

No.	Pos.	Nation	Player
1	GK	JPN	Kazuki Yamada
2	DF	JPN	Ryo Nakamura (on loan from Fujieda MYFC)
3	DF	JPN	Ryuya Ohata
4	MF	JPN	Taishi Tamashiro
5	DF	KOR	Kim Gunil
6	MF	JPN	Shusuke Yonehara
7	FW	JPN	Hiroto Konishi
8	MF	JPN	Riku Kamigaki
9	FW	JPN	Shota Aoki
10	MF	JPN	Kazuma Yamaguchi
11	FW	JPN	Toi Kagami
13	GK	JPN	Issei Kondo
14	MF	JPN	Ayahi Sakurai
15	MF	JPN	Koki Kazama
16	DF	JPN	Kotaro Yamahara (on loan from Ehime FC)
17	FW	JPN	Manato Hyakuda
18	FW	JPN	Shota Tanaka
19	MF	JPN	Mohammad Farzan Sana (on loan from Kashiwa Reysol)
20	MF	JPN	Taiyo Shimokawa
21	MF	NED	Yuya Ikeshita

No.	Pos.	Nation	Player
22	DF	JPN	Masato Nuki
23	DF	FRA	Sylvain Deslandes
25	DF	JPN	Rikiru Nakano
27	MF	JPN	Ren Fujimura
28	DF	JPN	Junya Nodake
29	FW	JPN	Kosei Matsumoto
30	DF	JPN	Tatsushi Koyanagi
36	MF	JPN	Shuto Adachi (on loan from Vissel Kobe)
37	MF	JPN	Gijo Sehata
39	MF	JPN	Rinya Sato
42	MF	JPN	Takatora Harada
44	MF	JPN	Shun Koga
52	DF	JPN	Jo Soma
69	FW	JPN	Shido Izuma (on loan from Consadole Sapporo)
77	MF	JPN	Sean Kotake (on loan from Shimizu S-Pulse)
78	GK	JPN	Shinji Okada
88	GK	KOR	Kim Je-hee
90	FW	SGP	Ikhsan Fandi
97	MF	KOR	Song Min-seob
99	FW	JPN	Taika Nakashima

=== Out on loan ===
Note: Flags indicate national team as defined under FIFA eligibility rules; some limited exceptions apply. Players may hold more than one non-FIFA nationality.

No.	Pos.	Nation	Player
26	DF	JPN	Ryusei Akimoto (at ReinMeer Aomori)
—	DF	JPN	Muku Arae (at Coedo Kawagoe)

No.	Pos.	Nation	Player
—	FW	JPN	Toranosuke Onozeki (at Basara Hyogo)

== Coaching staff ==
As of 18 September 2026

Position	Name
Manager	(Japan) Mitsumasa Yoda
Coach	(Japan) Kazunari Okayama
Coach	(Japan) Tadayo Fukuo
Coach	(South Korea) Kim Song-yong
Coach	(Japan) Keita Goto
Goalkeeping coach	(Japan) Hiroki Mizuhara
Physical coach	(Japan) Haruki Nishimura
Executive officer	(Japan) Hajime Hosogai
Operations officer	(Japan) Toshihiro Akimoto
Press officer	(Japan) Kanako Ideguchi

== Managerial history ==
Manager	Nationality	Tenure	
Manager	Nationality	Start	Finish
Ratko Stevović	Montenegro	1995	1997
Naoki Kimura	Japan	1998	1999
Ratko Stevović	Montenegro	2000	2001
Ryōsuke Okuno	Japan	1 February 2002	31 January 2004
Satoshi Tezuka	Japan	1 January 2005	31 December 2005
Shigeharu Ueki	Japan	1 February 2006	31 January 2009
Tōru Sano	Japan	1 February 2009	31 January 2010
Hiroshi Soejima	Japan	1 February 2010	31 January 2013
Tadahiro Akiba	Japan	1 February 2013	31 January 2015
Hiroki Hattori	Japan	1 January 2015	31 December 2016
Hitoshi Morishita	Japan	1 February 2017	31 January 2018
Keiichirō Nuno	Japan	1 February 2018	31 January 2020
Ryōsuke Okuno	Japan	1 February 2020	4 July 2021
Kiyokazu Kudō	Japan	5 July 2021	31 January 2022
Tsuyoshi Otsuki	Japan	1 February 2022	8 May 2024
Akira Muto	Japan	9 May 2024	31 January 2025
Masaru Okita	Japan	1 February 2025	14 September 2026
Mitsumasa Yoda	Japan	14 September 2026	present

== Kit evolution ==
Home kits - 1st
2003 - 2004	2005	2006 - 2007	2008	2009
2010	2011	2012	2013	2014
2015	2016	2017	2018	2019
2020	2021	2022	2023	2024
2025 -

Away kits - 2nd
2003 - 2004	2005	2006 - 2007	2008	2009
2010	2011	2012	2013	2014
2015	2016	2017	2018	2019
2020	2021	2022	2023	2024
2025 -				
