= 2023 J2 League =

25th season of J2 League

J2 League
- Season: 2023
- Dates: 18 February – 12 November
- Champions: Machida Zelvia
- Promoted: Machida Zelvia; Júbilo Iwata; Tokyo Verdy
- Relegated: Omiya Ardija; Zweigen Kanazawa
- Matches: 462
- Goals: 1,179 (2.55 per match)
- Top goalscorer: Juanma (26 goals)
- Biggest home win: Shimizu S-Pulse 9–1 Iwaki FC (7 May)
- Biggest away win: Renofa Yamaguchi 0–6 Shimizu S-Pulse (16 April); V-Varen Nagasaki 0–6 Machida Zelvia (23 September); Iwaki FC 1–7 Shimizu S-Pulse (21 October)
- Highest scoring: Shimizu S-Pulse 9–1 Iwaki FC (7 May)
- Longest winning run: JEF United Chiba (7 matches)
- Longest unbeaten run: Shimizu S-Pulse (13 matches)
- Longest winless run: Omiya Ardija (15 matches)
- Longest losing run: Montedio Yamagata (8 matches)
- Highest attendance: 47,628; Shimizu S-Pulse 2–2 JEF United Chiba (16 July)
- Lowest attendance: 1,493; Thespakusatsu Gunma 1–1 Roasso Kumamoto (5 July)
- Total attendance: 3,189,482
- Average attendance: 6,904

The 2023 J2 League, also known as the 2023 Meiji Yasuda J2 League (Japanese: 2023 明治安田生命J2リーグ, Hepburn: 2023 Meiji Yasuda Seimei J2 Rīgu) for sponsorship reasons, was the 25th season of the J2 League, the second-tier Japanese professional league for association football clubs, since its establishment in 1999.

== Overview ==
This was the last season to be played with 22 participating clubs, as the number of clubs was reduced to 20 from the 2024 season.

FC Ryukyu and Iwate Grulla Morioka were relegated to the 2023 J3 League, finishing the previous J2 League season as 21st and 22nd-placed team, respectively.

Relegated from J1, both Shimizu S-Pulse and Júbilo Iwata were the only Shizuoka-based J1 teams last season. Now, they return to J2 after spending six and one season, respectively, at the top flight.

J3 winners Iwaki FC and runners-up Fujieda MYFC were both promoted from the J3 League. Both teams make their debut in J2 League, with Iwaki being promoted to the J2 just a season after being promoted to J3.

For the first time ever since the 2004 season, three teams from the same prefecture participate in the J2 League, as Shimizu S-Pulse, Júbilo Iwata and Fujieda MYFC are all based on Shizuoka Prefecture.

== Participating clubs ==
Locations of the 2023 J2 League teams
Greater Tokyo Area J2 League teams
Shizuoka Prefecture J2 League teams

Club name	Hometown	Stadium	Capacity	Previous season rank	License
Blaublitz Akita	Akita	Soyu Stadium	20,125	J2 (12th)	J1
Fagiano Okayama	All cities/towns in Okayama (Note: centering on Okayama, Kurashiki, Tsuyama)	City Light Stadium	20,000	J2 (3rd)	J1
Fujieda MYFC	Cities/towns in Shizuoka Prefecture	Fujieda Soccer Stadium	13,000	J3 (2nd)	J1
Iwaki FC	Iwaki and Futaba District, Fukushima	Iwaki Green Field	5,600	J3 (1st)	J1
JEF United Chiba	Chiba & Ichihara, Chiba	Fukuda Denshi Arena	18,500	J2 (10th)	J1
Júbilo Iwata	Iwata, Shizuoka	Yamaha Stadium	15,156	J1 (18th)	J1
Machida Zelvia	Machida, Tokyo	Machida Athletic Stadium	10,600	J2 (15th)	J1
Mito HollyHock	All cities/towns in central and northern Ibaraki (Note: Mito, Hitachi, Hitachinaka, Kasama, Naka, Omitama, Hitachiota, Kitaibaraki, Hitachiomiya, Takahagi, Ibaraki, Shirosato, Oarai, Daigo, Tokai)	K's denki Stadium Mito	12,000	J2 (13th)	J1
Montedio Yamagata	All cities/towns in Yamagata (Note: centering on Yamagata, Tendo, Tsuruoka)	ND Soft Stadium	20,315	J2 (6th)	J1
Oita Trinita	Ōita Prefecture	Showa Denko Dome Oita	40,000	J2 (5th)	J1
Omiya Ardija	Saitama, Saitama	NACK5 Stadium Omiya	15,500	J2 (19th)	J1
Renofa Yamaguchi	All cities/towns in Yamaguchi	Yamaguchi Ishin Park Stadium	20,000	J2 (16th)	J1
Roasso Kumamoto	Kumamoto, Kumamoto	Egao Kenko Stadium	32,000	J2 (4th)	J1
Shimizu S-Pulse	Shizuoka	IAI Stadium Nihondaira	20,339	J1 (17th)	J1
Thespakusatsu Gunma	All cities/towns in Gunma (Note: centering on Kusatsu and Maebashi)	Shoda Shoyu Stadium Gunma	15,253	J2 (20th)	J1
Tochigi SC	Utsunomiya, Tochigi	Kanseki Stadium Tochigi	25,244	J2 (17th)	J1
Tokushima Vortis	Tokushima Prefecture	Pocarisweat Stadium	20,441	J2 (8th)	J1
Tokyo Verdy	All cities/towns in Tokyo	Ajinomoto Stadium	49,970	J2 (9th)	J1
V-Varen Nagasaki	All cities/towns in Nagasaki Prefecture (Note: centering on Nagasaki and Isahaya)	Nagasaki Athletic Stadium	20,246	J2 (11th)	J1
Vegalta Sendai	Miyagi Prefecture	Yurtec Stadium Sendai	19,694	J2 (7th)	J1
Ventforet Kofu	All cities/towns in Yamanashi Prefecture (Note: centering on Kofu and Nirasaki)	Yamanashi Chuo Bank Stadium	17,000	J2 (18th)	J1
Zweigen Kanazawa	All cities/towns in Ishikawa (Note: centering on Kanazawa, Nonoichi, Kahoku, Tsubata, Tsubata)	Ishikawa Kanazawa Stadium	20,000	J2 (14th)	J1

=== Personnel and kits ===
Club	Manager	Captain	Kit manufacturer	Main shirt sponsor
Blaublitz Akita	(Japan) Ken Yoshida	(Japan) Ryutaro Iio	(Brazil) Athleta	TDK
Fagiano Okayama	(Japan) Takashi Kiyama	(Japan) Yasutaka Takagi	(Brazil) Penalty	GROP
Fujieda MYFC	(Japan) Daisuke Sudo	(Japan) Masahiko Sugita	(Japan) Gol.	Seikan Kensa Center
Iwaki FC	(Japan) Yuzo Tamura	(Japan) Yuto Yamashita	(United States) Under Armour	BHC
JEF United Chiba	(Japan) Yoshiyuki Kobayashi	(Japan) Daisuke Suzuki	(Denmark) Hummel	Fuji Electric
Júbilo Iwata	(Japan) Akinobu Yokouchi	(Japan) Yuto Suzuki	(England) Admiral	Yamaha
Machida Zelvia	(Japan) Go Kuroda	(Japan) Masayuki Okuyama	(Germany) Adidas	CyberAgent
Mito HollyHock	(Japan) Yoshimi Hamasaki	(Japan) Takumi Kusumoto	(Japan) soccer junky	K's Holdings
Montedio Yamagata	(Japan) Susumu Watanabe	(Japan) Shuto Minami	(Brazil) Penalty	ABeam
Oita Trinita	(Japan) Takahiro Shimotaira	(Japan) Tsukasa Umesaki	(Germany) Puma	Daihatsu Kyushu
Omiya Ardija	(Japan) Masato Harasaki	(Japan) Yutaro Hakamata	(United States) Under Armour	NTT Docomo
Renofa Yamaguchi	(Argentina) Juan Esnáider	(Japan) Kensuke Sato	(Brazil) Finta	upr
Roasso Kumamoto	(Japan) Takeshi Oki	(Japan) Rei Hirakawa	(Germany) Puma	Hirata
Shimizu S-Pulse	(Japan) Tadahiro Akiba	(Japan) Yoshinori Suzuki	(Germany) Puma	Suzuyo
Thespakusatsu Gunma	(Japan) Tsuyoshi Otsuki	(Japan) Hajime Hosogai	(Spain) Kelme	Cainz
Tochigi SC	(Japan) Yu Tokisaki	(Japan) Sho Sato	(Brazil) Athleta	TKC
Tokushima Vortis	(Japan) Tatsuma Yoshida	(Japan) Yoichiro Kakitani	(Japan) Mizuno	Otsuka Pharmaceutical (Pocari Sweat)
Tokyo Verdy	(Japan) Hiroshi Jofuku	(Japan) Koki Morita	(Brazil) Athleta	Nicigas
V-Varen Nagasaki	(Brazil) Fábio Carille	(Japan) Shunya Yoneda	(England) Umbro	Japanet
Vegalta Sendai	(Japan) Takafumi Hori	(Japan) Yuta Koide	(Germany) Adidas	Iris Ohyama
Ventforet Kofu	(Japan) Yoshiyuki Shinoda	(Japan) Hidehiro Sugai	(Japan) Mizuno	Hakubaku
Zweigen Kanazawa	(Japan) Masaaki Yanagishita	(Japan) Yuto Shirai	(Denmark) Hummel	Hokkoku Shimbun

=== Managerial changes ===
Team	Outgoing	Manner	Exit date		Position in table	Incoming	Incoming date		Ref.
Team	Outgoing	Manner	Announced on	Departed on	Position in table	Incoming	Announced on	Arrived on	Ref.
Shimizu S-Pulse	Zé Ricardo	Sacked	3 April 2023		19th	Tadahiro Akiba	4 April 2023		
Montedio Yamagata	Peter Cklamovski	Sacked	4 April 2023		18th	Susumu Watanabe	5 April 2023		
Renofa Yamaguchi	Yoshihiro Natsuka	Resigned	9 May 2023		18th	Genki Nakayama (interim)	10 May 2023		
Omiya Ardija	Naoki Soma	Resigned	19 May 2023		22nd	Masato Harasaki	20 May 2023		
Renofa Yamaguchi	Genki Nakayama	End of interim spell	29 May 2023	7 June 2023	19th	Juan Esnáider	29 May 2023	8 June 2023	
Iwaki FC	Hiromasa Suguri	Sacked	14 June 2023		21st	Yuzo Tamura	15 June 2023		
Vegalta Sendai	Akira Ito	Sacked	12 July 2023		13th	Takafumi Hori	13 July 2023		
Tokushima Vortis	Beñat Labaien	Sacked	22 August 2023		19th	Tatsuma Yoshida	23 August 2023		

== Foreign players ==
As of the 2023 season, there are no more restrictions on a number of signed foreign players, but clubs can only register up to five foreign players for a single match-day squad. Players from J.League partner nations (Thailand, Vietnam, Myanmar, Malaysia, Cambodia, Singapore, Indonesia and Qatar) are exempt from these restrictions.

- Players name in **bold** indicates the player is registered during the midseason transfer window.
- Player's name in italics indicates the player has Japanese nationality in addition to their FIFA nationality, or is exempt from being treated as a foreign player due to having been born in Japan and being enrolled in, or having graduated from school in the country.

Club	Player 1	Player 2	Player 3	Player 4	Player 5	Player 6	Player 7	Player 8	Left mid-season
Blaublitz Akita									
Fagiano Okayama	(Brazil) Lucão	(Brazil) Tiago Alves	(South Korea) Han Eui-kwon	(Australia) Stefan Mauk	(Netherlands) Jordy Buijs				
Fujieda MYFC	(Brazil) Kauan	(Brazil) Pedro Henrique	(Brazil) Anderson Chaves	(Brazil) **Naldinho**					
Iwaki FC	(Brazil) **Nélson Machado**								
JEF United Chiba	(Brazil) Mendes	(Brazil) **Dudu**							
Júbilo Iwata	(Brazil) Ricardo Graça	(Brazil) Dudu Pacheco	(Colombia) Fabián González	(North Korea) **Ri Kyong-su**					
Machida Zelvia	(Brazil) Erik	(Brazil) **Ademilson**	(Australia) Mitchell Duke	(South Korea) Jang Min-gyu	(Serbia) Nedeljko Stojišić	(Chile) **Byron Vásquez**			
Mito HollyHock	(Philippines) Jefferson Tabinas								
Montedio Yamagata	(Brazil) Dellatorre	(Portugal) Tiago Alves							
Oita Trinita	(Brazil) Matheus Pereira	(Brazil) Matheus Teixeira	(Brazil) Derlan	(Brazil) Samuel					
Omiya Ardija	(Brazil) Rodrigo Angelotti	(Brazil) **Kaique**	(Poland) **Jakub Świerczok**						
Renofa Yamaguchi	(Brazil) Renan	(Brazil) **Sílvio**	(South Korea) Choi Hyun-chan	(South Korea) **Kim Byeom-yong**					
Roasso Kumamoto									
Shimizu S-Pulse	(Brazil) Carlinhos Júnior	(Brazil) Thiago Santana	(Brazil) Renato Augusto	(Brazil) Ronaldo	(Kosovo) Benjamin Kololli	(South Korea) Oh Se-hun			
Thespakusatsu Gunma									
Tochigi SC	(Brazil) Juninho	(Brazil) **Rafael Costa**	(Brazil) **Leandro Pereira**	(Nigeria) **Origbaajo Ismaila**					
Tokushima Vortis	(Brazil) Elsinho	(Spain) José Aurelio Suárez	(Dominican Republic) Luismi Quezada	(South Korea) Hyon Rio					(Brazil) Cacá (Nigeria) Oriola Sunday
Tokyo Verdy	(Brazil) Matheus Vidotto	(Indonesia) Pratama Arhan							(Chile) Byron Vásquez (Germany) Mario Engels
V-Varen Nagasaki	(Brazil) Caio César	(Brazil) Edigar Junio	(Brazil) Valdo	(Brazil) **Marcos Guilherme**	(Brazil) **Matheus Jesus**	(Spain) Juanma	(Spain) Carlos Gutiérrez	(Serbia) Luka Radotić	(Brazil) Clayson (Brazil) Kaique (Brazil) Cristiano
Vegalta Sendai	(Brazil) Foguinho	(Brazil) Ewerton	(South Korea) Kim Tae-hyeon	(South Korea) Heo Yong-joon	(North Korea) Ryang Yong-gi				
Ventforet Kofu	(Brazil) Eduardo Mancha	(Brazil) **Cristiano**	(Brazil) **Lucas Macedo**	(Nigeria) Peter Utaka	(New Zealand) **Michael Woud**				(Brazil) Getúlio
Zweigen Kanazawa	(Brazil) Léo Bahia	(Brazil) Jefferson Baiano	(South Korea) Park Jun-seo	(South Korea) Taiga Son					

== League table ==
Pos	Team	Pld	W	D	L	GF	GA	GD	Pts	Promotion or relegation
1	Machida Zelvia (C, P)	42	26	9	7	79	35	+44	87	Promotion to the J1 League
2	Júbilo Iwata (P)	42	21	12	9	74	44	+30	75	Promotion to the J1 League
3	Tokyo Verdy (O, P)	42	21	12	9	57	31	+26	75	Qualification for the promotion play-offs
4	Shimizu S-Pulse	42	20	14	8	78	34	+44	74	Qualification for the promotion play-offs
5	Montedio Yamagata	42	21	4	17	64	54	+10	67	Qualification for the promotion play-offs
6	JEF United Chiba	42	19	10	13	61	53	+8	67	Qualification for the promotion play-offs
7	V-Varen Nagasaki	42	18	11	13	70	56	+14	65	
8	Ventforet Kofu	42	18	10	14	60	50	+10	64	
9	Oita Trinita	42	17	11	14	54	56	−2	62	
10	Fagiano Okayama	42	13	19	10	49	49	0	58	
11	Thespakusatsu Gunma	42	14	15	13	44	44	0	57	
12	Fujieda MYFC	42	14	10	18	61	72	−11	52	
13	Blaublitz Akita	42	12	15	15	37	44	−7	51	
14	Roasso Kumamoto	42	13	10	19	52	53	−1	49	
15	Tokushima Vortis	42	10	19	13	43	53	−10	49	
16	Vegalta Sendai	42	12	12	18	48	61	−13	48	
17	Mito HollyHock	42	11	14	17	49	66	−17	47	
18	Iwaki FC	42	12	11	19	45	69	−24	47	
19	Tochigi SC	42	10	14	18	39	47	−8	44	
20	Renofa Yamaguchi	42	10	14	18	37	67	−30	44	
21	Omiya Ardija (R)	42	11	6	25	37	71	−34	39	Relegation to J3 League
22	Zweigen Kanazawa (R)	42	9	8	25	41	70	−29	35	Relegation to J3 League

Source: Meiji Yasuda J2 League, J.League Data Site
Rules for classification: 1) Points; 2) Goal difference; 3) Goals scored; 4) Head-to-head points; 5) Head-to-head goal difference; 6) Head-to-head goal scored; 7) Fair-play points.
(C) Champions; (O) Play-off winners; (P) Promoted; (R) Relegated

== Play-offs ==
The usual format was applied in the 2023 season. Promotion play-offs, officially called the 2023 J.League Road To J1 Play-offs (Japanese: 2023 J1昇格プレーオフ), was held from the semi-finals, where the match-ups were previously semi-determined. Based on the J2 placements at the end of the regular season, the third-placed team played against the sixth-placed, while the fourth-placed team played against the fifth-placed. The winners of the semi-finals played the final, with the winners promoted to the J1.

If a match was tied in the play-offs, the team with the higher rank won. The rank order was: J2's third, fourth, fifth, and sixth-placed teams.

For the 2023 season, three teams were to be promoted to the 2024 J1 League with no relegation playoffs between the leagues.

Semi-finals
3	Tokyo Verdy	2
6	JEF United Chiba	1
4	Shimizu S-Pulse	0
5	Montedio Yamagata	0

Final
3	Tokyo Verdy	1
4	Shimizu S-Pulse	1

=== Semi-finals ===
25 November 2023
13:03

Shimizu S-Pulse	0–0	Montedio Yamagata
	Report

IAI Stadium Nihondaira, Shimizu
Attendance: 15,742
Referee: Takuto Okabe

26 November 2023
15:03

Tokyo Verdy	2–1	JEF United Chiba
Nakahara 34'; Morita 44'	Report	Komori 78'

Ajinomoto Stadium, Chōfu
Attendance: 25,150
Referee: Hajime Matsuo

=== Final ===
2 December 2023
14:05

Tokyo Verdy	1–1	Shimizu S-Pulse
Someno 90+6' (pen.)	Report	Thiago Santana 63' (pen.)

Japan National Stadium, Tokyo
Attendance: 53,264
Referee: Akihiko Ikeuchi

== Season statistics ==
=== Goal contributions ===
==== Top scorers ====
Rank	Player	Club	Goals
1	(Spain) Juanma Delgado	V-Varen Nagasaki	26
2	(Brazil) Erik	Machida Zelvia	18
3	(Brazil) Carlinhos Júnior	Shimizu S-Pulse	15
4	(Japan) Hiiro Komori	JEF United Chiba	13
4	(Japan) Kaito Mori	Tokushima Vortis	13
4	(Portugal) Tiago Alves	Montedio Yamagata	13
4	(Japan) Ryo Watanabe	Fujieda MYFC	13

==== Top assists ====
Rank	Player	Club	Assists
1	(Japan) Takashi Inui	Shimizu S-Pulse	10
1	(Japan) Yuto Suzuki	Júbilo Iwata	10
3	(Japan) Rei Hirakawa	Roasso Kumamoto	9
3	(Japan) Ryo Sato	Thespakusatsu Gunma	9
3	(Japan) Hidetoshi Takeda	Mito HollyHock	9

==== Clean sheets ====
Rank	Player	Club	Clean sheets
1	(Brazil) Matheus Vidotto	Tokyo Verdy	23
2	(Japan) Shuichi Gonda	Shimizu S-Pulse	19
3	(Japan) Masatoshi Kushibiki	Thespakusatsu Gunma	16
4	(Japan) Kentaro Kakoi	Blaublitz Akita	14
5	(Japan) Go Hatano	V-Varen Nagasaki	11
5	(Japan) William Popp	Machida Zelvia	11
5	(Spain) José Aurelio Suárez	Tokushima Vortis	11

=== Discipline ===
==== Player ====
- Most yellow cards: 11
  - (Spain) Juanma Delgado (V-Varen Nagasaki)
- Most red cards: 2
  - (Japan) Ryo Endo (Iwaki FC)
  - (Japan) So Nakagawa (Fujieda MYFC)
  - (Brazil) Pereira (Oita Trinita)
  - (Japan) Kotaro Yamahara (Fujieda MYFC)

==== Club ====
- Most yellow cards: 69 (V-Varen Nagasaki)
- Most red cards: 7 (Fujieda MYFC)

== Awards ==
=== Monthly awards ===
Month	Manager of the Month		Monthly MVP		Goal of the Month		Refs.
Month	Manager	Club	Player	Club	Player	Club	Refs.
February/March	(Japan) Go Kuroda	Machida Zelvia	(Brazil) Erik	Machida Zelvia	(Japan) Akira Silvano Disaro	Shimizu S-Pulse	
April	(Brazil) Fábio Carille	V-Varen Nagasaki	(Spain) Juanma Delgado	V-Varen Nagasaki	(Japan) Shunta Araki	Machida Zelvia	
May	(Japan) Go Kuroda	Machida Zelvia	(Japan) Kaito Mori	Tokushima Vortis	(Japan) Shunya Yoneda	V-Varen Nagasaki	
June	(Japan) Akinobu Yokouchi	Júbilo Iwata	(Brazil) Erik	Machida Zelvia	(Japan) Kaito Umeda	Mito HollyHock	
July	(Japan) Yuzo Tamura	Iwaki FC	(Japan) Hiroto Iwabuchi	Iwaki FC	(Japan) Takashi Inui	Shimizu S-Pulse	
August	(Japan) Tadahiro Akiba	Shimizu S-Pulse	(Japan) Yoshinori Suzuki	Shimizu S-Pulse	(Japan) Keita Nakamura	V-Varen Nagasaki	
September	(Japan) Yoshiyuki Kobayashi	JEF United Chiba	(Japan) Taishi Taguchi	JEF United Chiba	(Japan) Junya Suzuki	Machida Zelvia	
October	(Japan) Hiroshi Jofuku	Tokyo Verdy	(Japan) Zento Uno	Machida Zelvia	(Japan) Kazaki Nakagawa	Fujieda MYFC	
November	(Japan) Akinobu Yokouchi	Júbilo Iwata	(Japan) Masaya Matsumoto	Júbilo Iwata	(Japan) Hikaru Nakahara	Tokyo Verdy	

== Attendances ==
#	Football club	Home games	Average attendance
1	Shimizu S-Pulse	21	12,083
2	Vegalta Sendai	21	9,495
3	Júbilo Iwata	21	9,447
4	JEF United	21	8,675
5	Oita Trinita	21	8,083
6	Tokyo Verdy	21	8,070
7	Montedio Yamagata	21	7,490
8	Machida Zelvia	21	7,478
9	Fagiano Okayama	21	7,248
10	Ventforet Kofu	21	7,045
11	V-Varen Nagasaki	21	6,760
12	Omiya Ardija	21	6,675
13	Tochigi SC	21	6,282
14	Roasso Kumamoto	21	6,251
15	Tokushima Vortis	21	6,002
16	Mito HollyHock	21	5,262
17	Zweigen Kanazawa	21	5,235
18	Renofa Yamaguchi	21	5,214
19	Fujieda MYFC	21	5,062
20	Iwaki FC	21	4,878
21	Thespakusatsu Gunma	21	4,876
22	Blaublitz Akita	21	4,388

== See also ==
National association

- Japan Football Association (JFA)

League

- Japanese association football league system
  - J.League
    - 2023 J1 League
    - 2023 J3 League
  - 2023 Japan Football League

Cup

- 2023 Emperor's Cup (national open cup)
