= 2025–26 AFC Champions League Elite league stage =

Club football tournament results

The 2025–26 AFC Champions League Elite league stage was played from 15 September 2025 to 18 February 2026.

== Draw ==
The draw for the league stage was held on 15 August 2025, 17:00 MYT (UTC+8), in Kuala Lumpur, Malaysia.

=== Seeding ===
For each region, the title holder or the highest seeded team from each member association involved were allocated into Pot 1, while the remaining teams were allocated into Pot 2.

Region	Pot 1	Pot 2
West Region	(Saudi Arabia) Al-Ahli (ACL); (United Arab Emirates) Shabab Al Ahli (UAE 1); (Qatar) Al Sadd (QAT 1); (Iran) Tractor (IRN 1); (Uzbekistan) Nasaf (UZB 1); (Iraq) Al-Shorta (IRQ 1)	(Saudi Arabia) Al-Ittihad (KSA 2); (United Arab Emirates) Sharjah (UAE 2); (Qatar) Al-Gharafa (QAT 2); (Saudi Arabia) Al-Hilal (KSA 3); (United Arab Emirates) Al Wahda (UAE 3); (Qatar) Al-Duhail (QAT 3)
East Region	(Japan) Vissel Kobe (JPN 1); (South Korea) Ulsan HD (KOR 1); (China) Shanghai Port (CHN 1); (Thailand) Buriram United (THA 1); (Australia) Melbourne City (AUS 1); (Malaysia) Johor Darul Ta'zim (MAS 1)	(Japan) Sanfrecce Hiroshima (JPN 2); (South Korea) Gangwon FC (KOR 2); (China) Shanghai Shenhua (CHN 2); (Japan) Machida Zelvia (JPN 3); (South Korea) FC Seoul (KOR 3); (China) Chengdu Rongcheng (CHN 3)

=== Grid result ===
Each team was drawn a position in the draw grid for their region: column A–C for West and D–F for East. Teams from Pot 1 were drawn into positions 1 or 2 while teams from Pot 2 were drawn into positions 3 or 4.

Each position had pre-determined matchups as part of a pairings grid. Teams in each column played matches with the other columns in each region.

Column	A	B	C	D	E	F
Number	West Region			East Region		
1	(Qatar) Al Sadd	(United Arab Emirates) Shabab Al Ahli	(Iran) Tractor	(China) Shanghai Port	(South Korea) Ulsan HD	(Thailand) Buriram United
2	(Uzbekistan) Nasaf	(Iraq) Al-Shorta	(Saudi Arabia) Al-Ahli	(Australia) Melbourne City	(Malaysia) Johor Darul Ta'zim	(Japan) Vissel Kobe
3	(Qatar) Al-Duhail	(United Arab Emirates) Sharjah	(Saudi Arabia) Al-Hilal	(China) Shanghai Shenhua	(South Korea) FC Seoul	(Japan) Sanfrecce Hiroshima
4	(Qatar) Al-Gharafa	(United Arab Emirates) Al Wahda	(Saudi Arabia) Al-Ittihad	(China) Chengdu Rongcheng	(South Korea) Gangwon FC	(Japan) Machida Zelvia

== Schedule ==
The schedule of the league stage is as follows:

Round	Dates (West region)	Dates (East region)
Matchday 1	15–16 September 2025	16–17 September 2025
Matchday 2	29–30 September 2025	30 September–1 October 2025
Matchday 3	20–21 October 2025	21–22 October 2025
Matchday 4	3–4 November 2025	4–5 November 2025
Matchday 5	24–25 November 2025	25–26 November 2025
Matchday 6	22–23 December 2025	9–10 December 2025
Matchday 7	9–10 February 2026	10–11 February 2026
Matchday 8	16–17 February 2026	17–18 February 2026

== League stage ==
=== West Region ===
Pos	Team	Pld	W	D	L	GF	GA	GD	Pts	Qualification
1	(Saudi Arabia) Al Hilal	8	7	1	0	17	6	+11	22	Advance to round of 16
2	(Saudi Arabia) Al-Ahli	8	5	2	1	21	9	+12	17	Advance to round of 16
3	(Iran) Tractor	8	5	2	1	12	4	+8	17	Advance to round of 16
4	(Saudi Arabia) Al-Ittihad	8	5	0	3	22	9	+13	15	Advance to round of 16
5	(United Arab Emirates) Al Wahda	8	4	2	2	11	7	+4	14	Advance to round of 16
6	(United Arab Emirates) Shabab Al Ahli	8	3	2	3	14	14	0	11	Advance to round of 16
7	(Qatar) Al-Duhail	8	2	2	4	16	16	0	8	Advance to round of 16
8	(Qatar) Al Sadd	8	2	2	4	12	16	−4	8	Advance to round of 16
9	(United Arab Emirates) Sharjah	8	2	2	4	8	16	−8	8	
10	(Qatar) Al-Gharafa	8	2	0	6	7	21	−14	6	
11	(Iraq) Al-Shorta	8	1	2	5	6	20	−14	5	
12	(Uzbekistan) Nasaf	8	1	1	6	9	17	−8	4	

Source: AFC
Rules for classification: 1) points; 2) goal difference; 3) number of goals scored; 4) number of matches won; 5) penalty shoot-out if only two teams remain tied and played each other on the final matchday 6) fair play ranking; 7) drawing of lots

==== Results summary ====
Matchday 1
Home team	Score	Away team
Sharjah (United Arab Emirates)	4–3	(Qatar) Al-Gharafa
Al Wahda (United Arab Emirates)	2–1	(Saudi Arabia) Al-Ittihad
Al-Ahli (Saudi Arabia)	4–2	(Uzbekistan) Nasaf
Al-Shorta (Iraq)	1–1	(Qatar) Al Sadd
Shabab Al Ahli (United Arab Emirates)	1–1	(Iran) Tractor
Al-Hilal (Saudi Arabia)	2–1	(Qatar) Al-Duhail

Matchday 2
Home team	Score	Away team
Nasaf (Uzbekistan)	2–3	(Saudi Arabia) Al-Hilal
Al-Gharafa (Qatar)	2–0	(Iraq) Al-Shorta
Tractor (Iran)	0–0	(United Arab Emirates) Al Wahda
Al-Duhail (Qatar)	2–2	(Saudi Arabia) Al-Ahli
Al Sadd (Qatar)	1–1	(United Arab Emirates) Sharjah
Al-Ittihad (Saudi Arabia)	0–1	(United Arab Emirates) Shabab Al Ahli

Matchday 3
Home team	Score	Away team
Al Wahda (United Arab Emirates)	3–1	(Qatar) Al-Duhail
Sharjah (United Arab Emirates)	0–5	(Iran) Tractor
Al-Shorta (Iraq)	1–4	(Saudi Arabia) Al-Ittihad
Al-Ahli (Saudi Arabia)	4–0	(Qatar) Al-Gharafa
Shabab Al Ahli (United Arab Emirates)	4–1	(Uzbekistan) Nasaf
Al-Hilal (Saudi Arabia)	3–1	(Qatar) Al Sadd

Matchday 4
Home team	Score	Away team
Nasaf (Uzbekistan)	1–2	(United Arab Emirates) Al Wahda
Tractor (Iran)	1–0	(Iraq) Al-Shorta
Al-Duhail (Qatar)	4–1	(United Arab Emirates) Shabab Al Ahli
Al-Gharafa (Qatar)	1–2	(Saudi Arabia) Al-Hilal
Al Sadd (Qatar)	1–2	(Saudi Arabia) Al-Ahli
Al-Ittihad (Saudi Arabia)	3–0	(United Arab Emirates) Sharjah

Matchday 5
Home team	Score	Away team
Nasaf (Uzbekistan)	0–1	(Iran) Tractor
Shabab Al Ahli (United Arab Emirates)	2–0	(Qatar) Al-Gharafa
Al-Duhail (Qatar)	4–2	(Saudi Arabia) Al-Ittihad
Al-Ahli (Saudi Arabia)	0–1	(United Arab Emirates) Sharjah
Al Wahda (United Arab Emirates)	3–1	(Qatar) Al Sadd
Al-Hilal (Saudi Arabia)	4–0	(Iraq) Al-Shorta

Matchday 6
Home team	Score	Away team
Sharjah (United Arab Emirates)	0–1	(Saudi Arabia) Al-Hilal
Tractor (Iran)	2–1	(Qatar) Al-Duhail
Al-Shorta (Iraq)	0–5	(Saudi Arabia) Al-Ahli
Al-Gharafa (Qatar)	1–0	(United Arab Emirates) Al Wahda
Al Sadd (Qatar)	4–2	(United Arab Emirates) Shabab Al Ahli
Al-Ittihad (Saudi Arabia)	1–0	(Uzbekistan) Nasaf

Matchday 7
Home team	Score	Away team
Nasaf (Uzbekistan)	1–1	(Iraq) Al-Shorta
Al Wahda (United Arab Emirates)	0–0	(Saudi Arabia) Al-Ahli
Shabab Al Ahli (United Arab Emirates)	0–0	(Saudi Arabia) Al-Hilal
Al-Duhail (Qatar)	1–1	(United Arab Emirates) Sharjah
Tractor (Iran)	0–2	(Qatar) Al Sadd
Al-Ittihad (Saudi Arabia)	7–0	(Qatar) Al-Gharafa

Matchday 8
Home team	Score	Away team
Sharjah (United Arab Emirates)	1–2	(Uzbekistan) Nasaf
Al-Ahli (Saudi Arabia)	4–3	(United Arab Emirates) Shabab Al Ahli
Al-Hilal (Saudi Arabia)	2–1	(United Arab Emirates) Al Wahda
Al-Shorta (Iraq)	3–2	(Qatar) Al-Duhail
Al Sadd (Qatar)	1–4	(Saudi Arabia) Al-Ittihad
Al-Gharafa (Qatar)	0–2	(Iran) Tractor

==== Matches ====
===== Matchday 1 =====
15 September 2025
17:45 UTC+4

Sharjah (United Arab Emirates)	4–3	(Qatar) Al-Gharafa
Manaj 60', 90+1'; O. Camara 62'; Coronado 90+10'	Report	Brahimi 33' (pen.); Joselu 45+4', 73' (pen.)

Sharjah Stadium, Sharjah
Attendance: 1,214
Referee: Majed Al-Shamrani (Saudi Arabia)

15 September 2025
20:00 UTC+4

Al Wahda (United Arab Emirates)	2–1	(Saudi Arabia) Al-Ittihad
Canedo 62'; Pimenta 90+8'	Report	Bergwijn 21'

Al Nahyan Stadium, Abu Dhabi
Attendance: 12,131
Referee: Salman Falahi (Qatar)

15 September 2025
21:15 UTC+3

Al-Shorta (Iraq)	1–1	(Qatar) Al Sadd
D. Mendy 28'	Report	Al-Haydos 62'

Al Zawraa Stadium, Baghdad
Attendance: 16,117
Referee: Qasim Al-Hatmi (Oman)

15 September 2025
21:15 UTC+3

Al-Ahli (Saudi Arabia)	4–2	(Uzbekistan) Nasaf
Millot 65', 68'; Mahrez 90+4'; Sulaiman 90+15'	Report	Norchaev 34', 41'

King Abdullah Sports City Stadium, Jeddah
Attendance: 20,666
Referee: Ryo Tanimoto (Japan)

16 September 2025
20:00 UTC+4

Shabab Al Ahli (United Arab Emirates)	1–1	(Iran) Tractor
Bala 65'	Report	Štrkalj 14'

Rashid Stadium, Dubai
Attendance: 3,010
Referee: Ma Ning (China)

16 September 2025
21:15 UTC+3

Al-Hilal (Saudi Arabia)	2–1	(Qatar) Al-Duhail
Núñez 57'; Hernández 67'	Report	Boulbina 37'

Kingdom Arena, Riyadh
Attendance: 18,802
Referee: Shaun Evans (Australia)

===== Matchday 2 =====
29 September 2025
18:45 UTC+5

Nasaf (Uzbekistan)	2–3	(Saudi Arabia) Al-Hilal
Bakhromov 27'; Sidikov 60'	Report	Milinković-Savić 21'; Hernández 45+2'; Leonardo 79'

Markaziy Stadium, Qarshi
Attendance: 17,120
Referee: Ahmad Al-Ali (Kuwait)

29 September 2025
19:00 UTC+3

Al-Gharafa (Qatar)	2–0	(Iraq) Al-Shorta
Joselu 48'; Sassi 54'	Report

Khalifa International Stadium, Al Rayyan
Attendance: 2,008
Referee: Sadullo Gulmurodi (Tajikistan)

29 September 2025
19:30 UTC+3:30

Tractor (Iran)	0–0	(United Arab Emirates) Al Wahda
	Report

Sahand Stadium, Tabriz
Attendance: 49,403
Referee: Mohammed Al-Hoaish (Saudi Arabia)

29 September 2025
21:15 UTC+3

Al-Duhail (Qatar)	2–2	(Saudi Arabia) Al-Ahli
Ed. Junior 25'; Piątek 48'	Report	Gonçalves 42'; Mahrez 45+1'

Abdullah Bin Khalifa Stadium, Doha
Attendance: 5,731
Referee: Omar Al-Ali (United Arab Emirates)

30 September 2025
19:00 UTC+3

Al Sadd (Qatar)	1–1	(United Arab Emirates) Sharjah
Afif 18'	Report	Lucas 73'

Jassim bin Hamad Stadium, Doha
Attendance: 6,891
Referee: Zaid Thamer Mohammed (Iraq)

30 September 2025
21:15 UTC+3

Al-Ittihad (Saudi Arabia)	0–1	(United Arab Emirates) Shabab Al Ahli
	Report	Ezatolahi 40'

King Abdullah Sports City Stadium, Jeddah
Attendance: 24,179
Referee: Adham Makhadmeh (Jordan)

===== Matchday 3 =====
20 October 2025
17:45 UTC+4

Al Wahda (United Arab Emirates)	3–1	(Qatar) Al-Duhail
Khribin 35' (pen.); B. Diarra 45+2'; Zouhir 67'	Report	Piątek 20'

Al Nahyan Stadium, Abu Dhabi
Attendance: 7,362
Referee: Sadullo Gulmurodi (Tajikistan)

20 October 2025
20:00 UTC+4

Sharjah (United Arab Emirates)	0–5	(Iran) Tractor
	Report	Lushkja 8', 11'; Hashemnejad 40'; Esmaeilifar 45+3'; Kazemayn 84'

Sharjah Stadium, Sharjah
Attendance: 966
Referee: Kim Jong-hyeok (South Korea)

20 October 2025
19:00 UTC+3

Al-Shorta (Iraq)	1–4	(Saudi Arabia) Al-Ittihad
Shakir 5'	Report	Diaby 17'; Fabinho 29'; Aouar 60', 76'

Al-Madina International Stadium, Baghdad
Attendance: 30,647
Referee: Omar Al Ali (United Arab Emirates)

20 October 2025
21:15 UTC+3

Al-Ahli (Saudi Arabia)	4–0	(Qatar) Al-Gharafa
Millot 32'; Kessié 38', 41'; Abu Al-Shamat 76'	Report

King Abdullah Sports City Stadium, Jeddah
Attendance: 8,484
Referee: Ma Ning (China)

21 October 2025
20:00 UTC+4

Shabab Al Ahli (United Arab Emirates)	4–1	(Uzbekistan) Nasaf
Cartabia 8'; Renan 27'; Mateusão 41'; Breno 90+5'	Report	Abdurakhmatov 10'

Rashid Stadium, Dubai
Attendance: 987
Referee: Shen Yinhao (China)

21 October 2025
21:15 UTC+3

Al-Hilal (Saudi Arabia)	3–1	(Qatar) Al Sadd
Akçiçek 25'; Koulibaly 40'; Milinkovic-Savic 84'	Report	Firmino 67'

Kingdom Arena, Riyadh
Attendance: 25,083
Referee: Ilgiz Tantashev (Uzbekistan)

===== Matchday 4 =====
3 November 2025
18:45 UTC+5

Nasaf (Uzbekistan)	1–2	(United Arab Emirates) Al Wahda
Bakhromov 42'	Report	Ogbu 52'; Canedo 89'

Markaziy Stadium, Qarshi
Attendance: 3,255
Referee: Khalid Al-Turais (Saudi Arabia)

3 November 2025
19:30 UTC+3:30

Tractor (Iran)	1–0	(Iraq) Al-Shorta
Torabi 26'	Report

Sahand Stadium, Tabriz
Attendance: 32,650
Referee: Abdulhadi Al-Ruaile (Qatar)

3 November 2025
19:00 UTC+3

Al-Duhail (Qatar)	4–1	(United Arab Emirates) Shabab Al Ahli
Ed. Junior 2'; Bourigeaud 39'; Boulbina 57'; Alberto 90+2'	Report	Breno 42'

Abdullah Bin Khalifa Stadium, Doha
Attendance: 1,900
Referee: Ko Hyung-jin (South Korea)

3 November 2025
21:15 UTC+3

Al-Gharafa (Qatar)	1–2	(Saudi Arabia) Al-Hilal
Al-Alwi 90+8'	Report	S. Al-Dawsari 9'; Kaio César 66'

Thani bin Jassim Stadium, Al Rayyan
Attendance: 7,429
Referee: Yusuke Araki (Japan)

4 November 2025
19:00 UTC+3

Al Sadd (Qatar)	1–2	(Saudi Arabia) Al-Ahli
Claudinho 63'	Report	Mahrez 34'; Gonçalves 68'

Jassim Bin Hamad Stadium, Doha
Attendance: 13,038
Referee: Shaun Evans (Australia)

4 November 2025
21:15 UTC+3

Al-Ittihad (Saudi Arabia)	3–0	(United Arab Emirates) Sharjah
Bergwijn 8'; Benzema 66'; R. Fernandes 90+4'	Report

King Abdullah Sports City Stadium, Jeddah
Attendance: 20,541
Referee: Ahmed Al-Kaf (Oman)

===== Matchday 5 =====
24 November 2025
18:45 UTC+5

Nasaf (Uzbekistan)	0–1	(Iran) Tractor
	Report	Lushkja 17'

Markaziy Stadium, Qarshi
Attendance: 5,283
Referee: Nazmi Nasaruddin (Malaysia)

24 November 2025
20:00 UTC+4

Shabab Al Ahli (United Arab Emirates)	2–0	(Qatar) Al-Gharafa
Kauan 9'; Bala 28'	Report

Rashid Stadium, Dubai
Attendance: 1,015
Referee: Muhammad Taqi (Singapore)

24 November 2025
19:00 UTC+3

Al-Duhail (Qatar)	4–2	(Saudi Arabia) Al-Ittihad
Boulbina 5', 33', 53'; Piątek 74'	Report	Benzema 76', 83'

Abdullah Bin Khalifa Stadium, Doha
Attendance: 6,384
Referee: Alireza Faghani (Australia)

24 November 2025
21:15 UTC+3

Al-Ahli (Saudi Arabia)	0–1	(United Arab Emirates) Sharjah
	Report	O. Camara 81'

King Abdullah Sports City Stadium, Jeddah
Attendance: 18,117
Referee: Ilgiz Tantashev (Uzbekistan)

25 November 2025
20:00 UTC+4

Al Wahda (United Arab Emirates)	3–1	(Qatar) Al Sadd
Tadić 55', 66'; Canedo 87'	Report	Claudinho 45+3' (pen.)

Al Nahyan Stadium, Abu Dhabi
Attendance: 7,319
Referee: Ryo Tanimoto (Japan)

25 November 2025
21:15 UTC+3

Al-Hilal (Saudi Arabia)	4–0	(Iraq) Al-Shorta
Leonardo 45', 72'; Milinković-Savić 63'; Cancelo 90+3'	Report

Kingdom Arena, Riyadh
Attendance: 23,637
Referee: Qasim Al-Hatmi (Oman)

===== Matchday 6 =====
22 December 2025
20:00 UTC+4

Sharjah (United Arab Emirates)	0–1	(Saudi Arabia) Al-Hilal
	Report	Malcom 81'

Sharjah Stadium, Sharjah
Attendance: 7,763
Referee: Salman Falahi (Qatar)

22 December 2025
19:30 UTC+3:30

Tractor (Iran)	2–1	(Qatar) Al-Duhail
Khalilzadeh 51'; Hosseinzadeh 90+2'	Report	Bourigeaud 35' (pen.)

Sahand Stadium, Tabriz
Attendance: 26,203
Referee: Ryo Tanimoto (Japan)

22 December 2025
21:15 UTC+3

Al-Shorta (Iraq)	0–5	(Saudi Arabia) Al-Ahli
	Report	Ibañez 30'; Toney 56'; Galeno 72'; Abu Al-Shamat 81'; Al-Johani 86'

Al Zawraa Stadium, Baghdad
Attendance: 4,864
Referee: Adel Al-Naqbi (United Arab Emirates)

22 December 2025
21:15 UTC+3

Al-Gharafa (Qatar)	1–0	(United Arab Emirates) Al Wahda
Sano 87'	Report

Thani bin Jassim Stadium, Al Rayyan
Attendance: 2,967
Referee: Qasim Al-Hatmi (Oman)

23 December 2025
19:00 UTC+3

Al Sadd (Qatar)	4–2	(United Arab Emirates) Shabab Al Ahli
Mújica 75', 90+11', 90+13'; Salman 90+5'	Report	Cartabia 47'; Al-Ghassani 70' (pen.)

Jassim bin Hamad Stadium, Doha
Attendance: 4,937
Referee: Alireza Faghani (Australia)

23 December 2025
21:15 UTC+3

Al-Ittihad (Saudi Arabia)	1–0	(Uzbekistan) Nasaf
Benzema 57'	Report

King Abdullah Sports City Stadium, Jeddah
Attendance: 14,829
Referee: Kim Jong-hyeok (South Korea)

===== Matchday 7 =====
9 February 2026
18:45 UTC+5

Nasaf (Uzbekistan)	1–1	(Iraq) Al-Shorta
Rakhmatov 8'	Report	Sh. Abdul-Kadhim 68'

Istiqlol Stadium, Fergana
Attendance: 1,321
Referee: Khalid Al-Turais (Saudi Arabia)

9 February 2026
17:45 UTC+4

Al Wahda (United Arab Emirates)	0–0	(Saudi Arabia) Al-Ahli
	Report

Al Nahyan Stadium, Abu Dhabi
Attendance: 2,233
Referee: Alireza Faghani (Australia)

9 February 2026
20:00 UTC+4

Shabab Al Ahli (United Arab Emirates)	0–0	(Saudi Arabia) Al-Hilal
	Report

Rashid Stadium, Dubai
Attendance: 2,855
Referee: Ilgiz Tantashev (Uzbekistan)

9 February 2026
19:00 UTC+3

Al-Duhail (Qatar)	1–1	(United Arab Emirates) Sharjah
Boulbina 81' (pen.)	Report	Coronado 41' (pen.)

Abdullah Bin Khalifa Stadium, Doha
Attendance: 2,843
Referee: Kim Jong-hyeok (South Korea)

10 February 2026
19:00 UTC+3

Tractor (Iran)	0–2	(Qatar) Al Sadd
	Report	Mújica 61'; Firmino 89'

Jassim bin Hamad Stadium, Doha (Qatar) (Note: Tractor were required to play their home matches at neutral venues instead of their regular home stadium, Sahand Stadium, Tabriz, due to security concerns relating to the 2026 Iran massacres.)
Attendance: 10,834
Referee: Mohammed Al-Hoaish (Saudi Arabia)

10 February 2026
21:15 UTC+3

Al-Ittihad (Saudi Arabia)	7–0	(Qatar) Al-Gharafa
En-Nesyri 3'; Aouar 20', 58', 79'; R. Fernandes 49', 62'; D. Pereira 51'	Report

King Abdullah Sports City Stadium, Jeddah
Attendance: 43,610
Referee: Adham Makhadmeh (Jordan)

===== Matchday 8 =====
16 February 2026
20:00 UTC+4

Sharjah (United Arab Emirates)	1–2	(Uzbekistan) Nasaf
Lucas 80' (pen.)	Report	Ibrahim 30' (o.g.); Abdunazarov 87'

Sharjah Stadium, Sharjah
Attendance: 852
Referee: Ahmed Al-Kaf (Oman)

16 February 2026
19:00 UTC+3

Al-Ahli (Saudi Arabia)	4–3	(United Arab Emirates) Shabab Al Ahli
Al-Buraikan 12'; Planić 35' (o.g.); Millot 45+3'; Abu Al-Shamat 52'	Report	Breno 66', 78'; Juma 90+5'

Prince Abdullah Al-Faisal Sports City Stadium, Jeddah
Attendance: 6,166
Referee: Ahmad Al-Ali (Kuwait)

16 February 2026
21:15 UTC+3

Al-Hilal (Saudi Arabia)	2–1	(United Arab Emirates) Al Wahda
Núñez 19', 77'	Report	B. Diarra 32'

Kingdom Arena, Riyadh
Attendance: 10,070
Referee: Ma Ning (China)

16 February 2026
21:15 UTC+3

Al-Shorta (Iraq)	3–2	(Qatar) Al-Duhail
Shakir 19'; Sambou 57', 58'	Report	Piątek 10'; Bourigeaud 45+2'

Al Zawraa Stadium, Baghdad
Attendance: 3,452
Referee: Nazmi Nasaruddin (Malaysia)

17 February 2026
19:00 UTC+3

Al Sadd (Qatar)	1–4	(Saudi Arabia) Al-Ittihad
Mújica 38'	Report	Aouar 10'; En-Nesyri 18'; Miguel 33' (o.g.); Keller 63'

Jassim bin Hamad Stadium, Doha
Attendance: 12,763
Referee: Yusuke Araki (Japan)

17 February 2026
19:00 UTC+3

Al-Gharafa (Qatar)	0–2	(Iran) Tractor
	Report	Hashemnejad 61'; Hosseinzadeh 81'

Thani bin Jassim Stadium, Al Rayyan
Attendance: 1,003
Referee: Kim Jong-hyeok (South Korea)

=== East Region ===
Pos	Team	Pld	W	D	L	GF	GA	GD	Pts	Qualification
1	(Japan) Machida Zelvia	8	5	2	1	15	7	+8	17	Advance to round of 16
2	(Japan) Vissel Kobe	8	5	1	2	14	7	+7	16	Advance to round of 16
3	(Japan) Sanfrecce Hiroshima	8	4	3	1	10	6	+4	15	Advance to round of 16
4	(Thailand) Buriram United	8	4	2	2	10	8	+2	14	Advance to round of 16
5	(Australia) Melbourne City	8	4	2	2	9	7	+2	14	Advance to round of 16
6	(Malaysia) Johor Darul Ta'zim	8	3	2	3	8	7	+1	11	Advance to round of 16
7	(South Korea) FC Seoul	8	2	4	2	10	9	+1	10	Advance to round of 16
8	(South Korea) Gangwon FC	8	2	3	3	9	11	−2	9	Advance to round of 16
9	(South Korea) Ulsan HD	8	2	3	3	6	8	−2	9	
10	(China) Chengdu Rongcheng	8	1	3	4	7	11	−4	6	
11	(China) Shanghai Shenhua	8	1	1	6	5	13	−8	4	
12	(China) Shanghai Port	8	0	4	4	2	11	−9	4	

Source: AFC
Rules for classification: 1) points; 2) goal difference; 3) number of goals scored; 4) number of matches won; 5) penalty shoot-out if only two teams remain tied and played each other on the final matchday 6) fair play ranking; 7) drawing of lots

==== Results summary ====
Matchday 1
Home team	Score	Away team
Melbourne City (Australia)	0–2	(Japan) Sanfrecce Hiroshima
Gangwon FC (South Korea)	2–1	(China) Shanghai Shenhua
Machida Zelvia (Japan)	1–1	(South Korea) FC Seoul
Buriram United (Thailand)	2–1	(Malaysia) Johor Darul Ta'zim
Ulsan HD (South Korea)	2–1	(China) Chengdu Rongcheng
Shanghai Port (China)	0–3	(Japan) Vissel Kobe

Matchday 2
Home team	Score	Away team
Sanfrecce Hiroshima (Japan)	1–1	(China) Shanghai Port
FC Seoul (South Korea)	3–0	(Thailand) Buriram United
Chengdu Rongcheng (China)	1–0	(South Korea) Gangwon FC
Johor Darul Ta'zim (Malaysia)	0–0	(Japan) Machida Zelvia
Vissel Kobe (Japan)	1–0	(Australia) Melbourne City
Shanghai Shenhua (China)	1–1	(South Korea) Ulsan HD

Matchday 3
Home team	Score	Away team
Melbourne City (Australia)	2–1	(Thailand) Buriram United
Ulsan HD (South Korea)	1–0	(Japan) Sanfrecce Hiroshima
Chengdu Rongcheng (China)	0–2	(Malaysia) Johor Darul Ta'zim
Shanghai Port (China)	0–2	(Japan) Machida Zelvia
Gangwon FC (South Korea)	4–3	(Japan) Vissel Kobe
Shanghai Shenhua (China)	2–0	(South Korea) FC Seoul

Matchday 4
Home team	Score	Away team
Sanfrecce Hiroshima (Japan)	1–0	(South Korea) Gangwon FC
Machida Zelvia (Japan)	1–2	(Australia) Melbourne City
FC Seoul (South Korea)	0–0	(China) Chengdu Rongcheng
Buriram United (Thailand)	2–0	(China) Shanghai Port
Vissel Kobe (Japan)	1–0	(South Korea) Ulsan HD
Johor Darul Ta'zim (Malaysia)	3–1	(China) Shanghai Shenhua

Matchday 5
Home team	Score	Away team
Melbourne City (Australia)	2–0	(Malaysia) Johor Darul Ta'zim
Gangwon FC (South Korea)	1–3	(Japan) Machida Zelvia
Shanghai Port (China)	1–3	(South Korea) FC Seoul
Chengdu Rongcheng (China)	1–1	(Japan) Sanfrecce Hiroshima
Ulsan HD (South Korea)	0–0	(Thailand) Buriram United
Shanghai Shenhua (China)	0–2	(Japan) Vissel Kobe

Matchday 6
Home team	Score	Away team
Vissel Kobe (Japan)	2–2	(China) Chengdu Rongcheng
Machida Zelvia (Japan)	3–1	(South Korea) Ulsan HD
Buriram United (Thailand)	2–2	(South Korea) Gangwon FC
Johor Darul Ta'zim (Malaysia)	0–0	(China) Shanghai Port
Sanfrecce Hiroshima (Japan)	1–0	(China) Shanghai Shenhua
FC Seoul (South Korea)	1–1	(Australia) Melbourne City

Matchday 7
Home team	Score	Away team
Vissel Kobe (Japan)	2–0	(South Korea) FC Seoul
Sanfrecce Hiroshima (Japan)	2–1	(Malaysia) Johor Darul Ta'zim
Shanghai Shenhua (China)	0–2	(Japan) Machida Zelvia
Chengdu Rongcheng (China)	0–1	(Thailand) Buriram United
Ulsan HD (South Korea)	1–2	(Australia) Melbourne City
Gangwon FC (South Korea)	0–0	(China) Shanghai Port

Matchday 8
Home team	Score	Away team
Machida Zelvia (Japan)	3–2	(China) Chengdu Rongcheng
FC Seoul (South Korea)	2–2	(Japan) Sanfrecce Hiroshima
Buriram United (Thailand)	2–0	(China) Shanghai Shenhua
Johor Darul Ta'zim (Malaysia)	1–0	(Japan) Vissel Kobe
Shanghai Port (China)	0–0	(South Korea) Ulsan HD
Melbourne City (Australia)	0–0	(South Korea) Gangwon FC

==== Matches ====
===== Matchday 1 =====
16 September 2025
17:45 UTC+10

Melbourne City (Australia)	0–2	(Japan) Sanfrecce Hiroshima
	Report	M. Júnior 52' (pen.); Nakajima 81'

Melbourne Rectangular Stadium, Melbourne
Attendance: 1,423
Referee: Payam Heydari (Iran)

16 September 2025
19:00 UTC+9

Gangwon FC (South Korea)	2–1	(China) Shanghai Shenhua
Hong Chul 54'; Goo Bon-cheul 63'	Report	Teixeira 45+1'

Chuncheon Songam Sports Town Stadium, Chuncheon
Attendance: 4,091
Referee: Ammar Mahfoodh (Bahrain)

16 September 2025
19:00 UTC+9

Machida Zelvia (Japan)	1–1	(South Korea) FC Seoul
Mochizuki 80'	Report	Dugandžić 59'

Machida City Nozuta Park Stadium, Machida
Attendance: 4,798
Referee: Asker Nadjafaliev (Uzbekistan)

16 September 2025
19:15 UTC+7

Buriram United (Thailand)	2–1	(Malaysia) Johor Darul Ta'zim
Suphanat 50'; R. Žulj 54'	Report	Glauder 28'

Buriram Stadium, Buriram
Attendance: 21,937
Referee: Alireza Faghani (Australia)

17 September 2025
19:00 UTC+9

Ulsan HD (South Korea)	2–1	(China) Chengdu Rongcheng
Um Won-sang 76'; Heo Yool 90+5'	Report	Delgado 44'

Ulsan Munsu Football Stadium, Ulsan
Attendance: 3,111
Referee: Ilgiz Tantashev (Uzbekistan)

17 September 2025
20:15 UTC+8

Shanghai Port (China)	0–3	(Japan) Vissel Kobe
	Report	Erik 20'; Miyashiro 41'; Osako 45'

Pudong Football Stadium, Shanghai
Attendance: 12,966
Referee: Choi Hyun-jai (South Korea)

===== Matchday 2 =====
30 September 2025
19:00 UTC+9

Sanfrecce Hiroshima (Japan)	1–1	(China) Shanghai Port
Araki 19'	Report	Gabrielzinho 83'

Hiroshima Soccer Stadium, Hiroshima
Attendance: 7,819
Referee: Alex King (Australia)

30 September 2025
19:00 UTC+9

FC Seoul (South Korea)	3–0	(Thailand) Buriram United
Choi Jun 38'; Jeong Seung-won 45+3'; Lucas 68'	Report

Seoul World Cup Stadium, Seoul
Attendance: 6,443
Referee: Abdulrahman Al-Jassim (Qatar)

30 September 2025
20:15 UTC+8

Chengdu Rongcheng (China)	1–0	(South Korea) Gangwon FC
Chow 35'	Report

Phoenix Hill Sports Park Football Stadium, Chengdu
Attendance: 41,463
Referee: Adel Al-Naqbi (United Arab Emirates)

30 September 2025
20:15 UTC+8

Johor Darul Ta'zim (Malaysia)	0–0	(Japan) Machida Zelvia
	Report

Sultan Ibrahim Stadium, Iskandar Puteri
Attendance: 28,915
Referee: Kim Jong-hyeok (South Korea)

1 October 2025
19:00 UTC+9

Vissel Kobe (Japan)	1–0	(Australia) Melbourne City
Yuruki 90+4'	Report

Kobe City Misaki Park Stadium, Kobe
Attendance: 5,119
Referee: Rustam Lutfullin (Uzbekistan)

1 October 2025
20:15 UTC+8

Shanghai Shenhua (China)	1–1	(South Korea) Ulsan HD
Asué 48'	Report	Ludwigson 62'

Shanghai Stadium, Shanghai
Attendance: 30,645
Referee: Yusuke Araki (Japan)

===== Matchday 3 =====
21 October 2025
18:45 UTC+11

Melbourne City (Australia)	2–1	(Thailand) Buriram United
Rashani 84'; Caputo 90+7'	Report	Čaušić 72'

Melbourne Rectangular Stadium, Melbourne
Attendance: 2,018
Referee: Yoshimi Yamashita (Japan)

21 October 2025
19:00 UTC+9

Ulsan HD (South Korea)	1–0	(Japan) Sanfrecce Hiroshima
Kim Min-hyeok 12'	Report

Ulsan Munsu Football Stadium, Ulsan
Attendance: 2,966
Referee: Majed Al-Shamrani (Saudi Arabia)

21 October 2025
18:00 UTC+8

Chengdu Rongcheng (China)	0–2	(Malaysia) Johor Darul Ta'zim
	Report	Arribas 5'; Méndez 62'

Phoenix Hill Sports Park Football Stadium, Chengdu
Attendance: 39,093
Referee: Abdulrahman Al-Jassim (Qatar)

21 October 2025
20:15 UTC+8

Shanghai Port (China)	0–2	(Japan) Machida Zelvia
	Report	Fu Huan 12' (o.g.); Sōma 25'

Pudong Football Stadium, Shanghai
Attendance: 10,197
Referee: Ahmed Eisa Darwish (United Arab Emirates)

22 October 2025
19:00 UTC+9

Gangwon FC (South Korea)	4–3	(Japan) Vissel Kobe
Lee Sang-heon 7'; Mo Jae-hyeon 21'; Song Jun-seok 43'; Kim Gun-hee 90+5'	Report	Miyashiro 48', 89'; Patric 50'

Chuncheon Songam Sports Town Stadium, Chuncheon
Attendance: 4,158
Referee: Mooud Bonyadifard (Iran)

22 October 2025
20:15 UTC+8

Shanghai Shenhua (China)	2–0	(South Korea) FC Seoul
Asué 57'; A. Luis 89'	Report

Shanghai Stadium, Shanghai
Attendance: 20,427
Referee: Abdullah Jamali (Kuwait)

===== Matchday 4 =====
4 November 2025
19:00 UTC+9

Sanfrecce Hiroshima (Japan)	1–0	(South Korea) Gangwon FC
Kato 63'	Report

Hiroshima Soccer Stadium, Hiroshima
Attendance: 8,924
Referee: Casey Reibelt (Australia)

4 November 2025
19:00 UTC+9

Machida Zelvia (Japan)	1–2	(Australia) Melbourne City
Mochizuki 24'	Report	Shoji 1' (o.g.); Nabbout 90+4'

Machida City Nozuta Park Stadium, Machida
Attendance: 4,401
Referee: Abdulla Al-Marri (Qatar)

4 November 2025
19:00 UTC+9

FC Seoul (South Korea)	0–0	(China) Chengdu Rongcheng
	Report

Seoul World Cup Stadium, Seoul
Attendance: 6,279
Referee: Nazmi Nasaruddin (Malaysia)

4 November 2025
19:15 UTC+7

Buriram United (Thailand)	2–0	(China) Shanghai Port
Supachai 15'; Good 65'	Report

Buriram Stadium, Buriram
Attendance: 14,161
Referee: Asker Nadjafaliev (Uzbekistan)

5 November 2025
19:00 UTC+9

Vissel Kobe (Japan)	1–0	(South Korea) Ulsan HD
Patric 58'	Report

Kobe City Misaki Park Stadium, Kobe
Attendance: 7,117
Referee: Muhammad Taqi (Singapore)

5 November 2025
20:15 UTC+8

Johor Darul Ta'zim (Malaysia)	3–1	(China) Shanghai Shenhua
J. Silva 48', 88'; Arribas 63'	Report	Mineiro 71' (pen.)

Sultan Ibrahim Stadium, Iskandar Puteri
Attendance: 20,218
Referee: Adham Makhadmeh (Jordan)

===== Matchday 5 =====
25 November 2025
18:45 UTC+11

Melbourne City (Australia)	2–0	(Malaysia) Johor Darul Ta'zim
Caputo 3'; Memeti 90+2'	Report

Melbourne Rectangular Stadium, Melbourne
Attendance: 2,165
Referee: Adel Al-Naqbi (United Arab Emirates)

25 November 2025
19:00 UTC+9

Gangwon FC (South Korea)	1–3	(Japan) Machida Zelvia
Park Ho-young 55'	Report	Sento 24'; Shimoda 28'; Oh Se-hun 39'

Chuncheon Songam Sports Town Stadium, Chuncheon
Attendance: 3,502
Referee: Khalid Al-Turais (Saudi Arabia)

25 November 2025
18:00 UTC+8

Shanghai Port (China)	1–3	(South Korea) FC Seoul
Vital 57'	Report	Lingard 48', 77'; Lucas 61'

Pudong Football Stadium, Shanghai
Attendance: 11,501
Referee: Mohammed Al-Hoish (Saudi Arabia)

25 November 2025
20:15 UTC+8

Chengdu Rongcheng (China)	1–1	(Japan) Sanfrecce Hiroshima
Felipe 54' (pen.)	Report	Kato 63'

Phoenix Hill Sports Park Football Stadium, Chengdu
Attendance: 27,836
Referee: Abdulla Al-Marri (Qatar)

26 November 2025
19:00 UTC+9

Ulsan HD (South Korea)	0–0	(Thailand) Buriram United
	Report

Ulsan Munsu Football Stadium, Ulsan
Attendance: 2,598
Referee: Ahmed Al-Ali (Kuwait)

26 November 2025
20:15 UTC+8

Shanghai Shenhua (China)	0–2	(Japan) Vissel Kobe
	Report	Ideguchi 31'; Yamakawa 39'

Shanghai Stadium, Shanghai
Attendance: 12,487
Referee: Kim Jong-hyeok (South Korea)

===== Matchday 6 =====
9 December 2025
19:00 UTC+9

Vissel Kobe (Japan)	2–2	(China) Chengdu Rongcheng
Muto 18'; D. Sasaki 90' (pen.)	Report	Felipe 45+1', 77' (pen.)

Kobe City Misaki Park Stadium, Kobe
Attendance: 8,718
Referee: Mohammed Al-Hoaish (Saudi Arabia)

9 December 2025
19:00 UTC+9

Machida Zelvia (Japan)	3–1	(South Korea) Ulsan HD
Masuyama 6'; Nishimura 21'; Oh Se-hun 47'	Report	Um Won-sang 55'

Machida City Nozuta Park Stadium, Machida
Attendance: 4,345
Referee: Nazmi Nasaruddin (Malaysia)

9 December 2025
19:15 UTC+7

Buriram United (Thailand)	2–2	(South Korea) Gangwon FC
Ko Myeong-seok 58'; Suphanat 65'	Report	Mo Jae-hyeon 33'; Kim Dae-won 74' (pen.)

Buriram Stadium, Buriram
Attendance: 15,329
Referee: Omar Al-Ali (United Arab Emirates)

9 December 2025
20:15 UTC+8

Johor Darul Ta'zim (Malaysia)	0–0	(China) Shanghai Port
	Report

Sultan Ibrahim Stadium, Iskandar Puteri
Attendance: 19,760
Referee: Shaun Evans (Australia)

10 December 2025
19:00 UTC+9

Sanfrecce Hiroshima (Japan)	1–0	(China) Shanghai Shenhua
Araki 78'	Report

Hiroshima Soccer Stadium, Hiroshima
Attendance: 13,240
Referee: Ahmad Al-Ali (Kuwait)

10 December 2025
19:00 UTC+9

FC Seoul (South Korea)	1–1	(Australia) Melbourne City
Lingard 31'	Report	Kanamori 74'

Seoul World Cup Stadium, Seoul
Attendance: 8,106
Referee: Mohanad Qasim Sarray (Iraq)

===== Matchday 7 =====
10 February 2026
19:00 UTC+9

Vissel Kobe (Japan)	2–0	(South Korea) FC Seoul
Muto 69'; G. Sakai 73'	Report

Kobe City Misaki Park Stadium, Kobe
Attendance: 7,159
Referee: Nazmi Nasaruddin (Malaysia)

10 February 2026
19:00 UTC+9

Sanfrecce Hiroshima (Japan)	2–1	(Malaysia) Johor Darul Ta'zim
A. Suzuki 18' (pen.), 47'	Report	M. Guilherme 3'

Hiroshima Soccer Stadium, Hiroshima
Attendance: 10,132
Referee: Ma Ning (China)

10 February 2026
20:15 UTC+8

Shanghai Shenhua (China)	0–2	(Japan) Machida Zelvia
	Report	Sōma 3' (pen.), 88'

Shanghai Stadium, Shanghai
Attendance: 16,158
Referee: Omar Al-Ali (United Arab Emirates)

10 February 2026
20:15 UTC+8

Chengdu Rongcheng (China)	0–1	(Thailand) Buriram United
	Report	Bissoli 50'

Phoenix Hill Sports Park Football Stadium, Chengdu
Attendance: 40,676
Referee: Yusuke Araki (Japan)

11 February 2026
19:00 UTC+9

Ulsan HD (South Korea)	1–2	(Australia) Melbourne City
Bojanic 80'	Report	Caputo 36'; Younis 90+3'

Ulsan Munsu Football Stadium, Ulsan
Attendance: 3,750
Referee: Ahmed Al-Kaf (Oman)

11 February 2026
19:00 UTC+9

Gangwon FC (South Korea)	0–0	(China) Shanghai Port
	Report

Chuncheon Songam Sports Town Stadium, Chuncheon
Attendance: 2,527
Referee: Ahmad Al-Ali (Kuwait)

===== Matchday 8 =====
17 February 2026
19:00 UTC+9

Machida Zelvia (Japan)	3–2	(China) Chengdu Rongcheng
T. Yengi 7', 55'; Shirasaki 25'	Report	Shihao 32'; Felipe 90'

Machida City Nozuta Park Stadium, Machida
Attendance: 3,653
Referee: Alireza Faghani (Australia)

17 February 2026
19:00 UTC+9

FC Seoul (South Korea)	2–2	(Japan) Sanfrecce Hiroshima
Klimala 10' (pen.); Arai 27' (o.g.)	Report	Germain 90+3'; Kinoshita 90+6'

Mokdong Stadium, Seoul (Note: FC Seoul played their home matches at Mokdong Stadium, Seoul, instead of their regular home stadium Seoul World Cup Stadium, Seoul.)
Attendance: 7,441
Referee: Khalid Al-Turais (Saudi Arabia)

17 February 2026
19:15 UTC+7

Buriram United (Thailand)	2–0	(China) Shanghai Shenhua
Good 11'; Suphanat 22'	Report

Buriram Stadium, Buriram
Attendance: 15,971
Referee: Abdulrahman Al-Jassim (Qatar)

17 February 2026
20:15 UTC+8

Johor Darul Ta'zim (Malaysia)	1–0	(Japan) Vissel Kobe
M. Guilherme 74'	Report

Sultan Ibrahim Stadium, Iskandar Puteri
Attendance: 31,673
Referee: Ilgiz Tantashev (Uzbekistan)

18 February 2026
18:00 UTC+8

Shanghai Port (China)	0–0	(South Korea) Ulsan HD
	Report

Pudong Football Stadium, Shanghai
Attendance: 15,103
Referee: Adel Al-Naqbi (United Arab Emirates)

18 February 2026
21:00 UTC+11

Melbourne City (Australia)	0–0	(South Korea) Gangwon FC
	Report

Melbourne Rectangular Stadium, Melbourne
Attendance: 936
Referee: Mohammed Al-Shammari (Qatar)

== See also ==
- 2025–26 AFC Champions League Two group stage
- 2025–26 AFC Challenge League group stage
