= 2025–26 AFC Champions League Elite knockout stage =

Asia premier club football tournament

The 2025–26 AFC Champions League Elite knockout stage began in the East region on 3 March with the round of 16, and ended on 25 April 2026 with the final to decide the champions of the 2025–26 AFC Champions League Elite. A total of 16 teams competed in the knockout stage.

The tournament winner qualified for the 2029 FIFA Club World Cup and 2026 FIFA Intercontinental Cup. Additionally, the winner entered the league stage of the 2026–27 AFC Champions League Elite, if they have not already qualified through their domestic performance.

== Qualified teams ==
The top eight teams in the league stage from each region advanced to the round of 16, with eight teams each from West Region and East Region.

West Region
Pos.	Team
1	(Saudi Arabia) Al Hilal
2	(Saudi Arabia) Al-Ahli
3	(Iran) Tractor
4	(Saudi Arabia) Al-Ittihad
5	(United Arab Emirates) Al Wahda
6	(United Arab Emirates) Shabab Al Ahli
7	(Qatar) Al-Duhail
8	(Qatar) Al Sadd

East Region
Pos.	Team
1	(Japan) Machida Zelvia
2	(Japan) Vissel Kobe
3	(Japan) Sanfrecce Hiroshima
4	(Thailand) Buriram United
5	(Australia) Melbourne City
6	(Malaysia) Johor Darul Ta'zim
7	(South Korea) FC Seoul
8	(South Korea) Gangwon FC

== Format ==
In the knockout stage, the 16 teams played a single-elimination tournament. The round of 16 saw each team play against team from its region, with cross-regional pairings made for the quarter-finals. Each tie was played as a single match, except the round of 16 which was played on a home-and-away two-legged basis. Extra time and a penalty shoot-out were used to decide the winner if necessary (Regulations Article 10). The match-ups for the quarter-finals, semi-finals, and final were determined at a single draw event.

== Schedule ==
The round of 16 for the West Region was postponed due to the impacts from the 2026 Iran war. On 24 March, the AFC announced that all West Region round of 16 ties would be changed to single-leg ties at a centralised venue.

The schedule of the competition was as follows.

Schedule for 2025–26 AFC Champions League Elite
Stage	Round	Draw date	East Region	West Region
Knockout stage	Round of 16	No draw (Note: Pre-determined format)	3 March 2026 (first leg); 10 March 2026 (second leg)	13–14 April 2026
Knockout stage	Quarter-finals	25 March	16–18 April 2026	
Knockout stage	Semi-finals	25 March	20–21 April 2026	
Knockout stage	Final	25 March	25 April 2026	

== Bracket ==
Round of 16
13 April – Jeddah (Al-Faisal)
W1	(Saudi Arabia) Al Hilal	3 (2)
W8	(Qatar) Al Sadd (p)	3 (4)
E7	(South Korea) FC Seoul	0	1	1
E2	(Japan) Vissel Kobe	1	2	3
13 April – Jeddah (King Abdullah)
W2	(Saudi Arabia) Al-Ahli (a.e.t.)	1
W7	(Qatar) Al-Duhail	0
E6	(Malaysia) Johor Darul Ta'zim	3	0	3
E3	(Japan) Sanfrecce Hiroshima	1	1	2
E8	(South Korea) Gangwon FC	0	0	0
E1	(Japan) Machida Zelvia	0	1	1
14 April – Jeddah (King Abdullah)
W4	(Saudi Arabia) Al-Ittihad (a.e.t.)	1
W5	(United Arab Emirates) Al Wahda	0
E5	(Australia) Melbourne City	1	0	1 (2)
E4	(Thailand) Buriram United (p)	1	0	1 (4)
14 April – Jeddah (Al-Faisal)
W3	(Iran) Tractor	0
W6	(United Arab Emirates) Shabab Al Ahli	3

Quarter-finals
16 April – Jeddah (Al-Faisal)
W8	(Qatar) Al Sadd	3 (4)
E2	(Japan) Vissel Kobe (p)	3 (5)
17 April – Jeddah (King Abdullah)
W2	(Saudi Arabia) Al-Ahli	2
E6	(Malaysia) Johor Darul Ta'zim	1
17 April – Jeddah (Al-Faisal)
E1	(Japan) Machida Zelvia	1
W4	(Saudi Arabia) Al-Ittihad	0
18 April – Jeddah (Al-Faisal)
E4	(Thailand) Buriram United	2
W6	(United Arab Emirates) Shabab Al Ahli (a.e.t.)	3

Semi-finals
20 April – Jeddah (King Abdullah)
E2	(Japan) Vissel Kobe	1
W2	(Saudi Arabia) Al-Ahli	2
21 April – Jeddah (Al-Faisal)
E1	(Japan) Machida Zelvia	1
W6	(United Arab Emirates) Shabab Al Ahli	0

Final
25 April – Jeddah (King Abdullah)
W2	(Saudi Arabia) Al-Ahli (a.e.t.)	1
E1	(Japan) Machida Zelvia	0

== Round of 16 ==
=== Summary ===
The first legs for the East Region were played on 3 and 4 March, with the second legs played on 10 and 11 March.

The West Region round of 16 fixtures (originally scheduled for March 2026) were postponed by the AFC due to the impacts from the 2026 Iran war. The format changed to single-leg ties, held on 13 and 14 April in Jeddah, Saudi Arabia.

Team 1	Score	Team 2
West Region
Al Hilal (Saudi Arabia)	3–3 (a.e.t.) (2–4 p)	(Qatar) Al Sadd
Al-Ahli (Saudi Arabia)	1–0 (a.e.t.)	(Qatar) Al-Duhail
Tractor (Iran)	0–3	(United Arab Emirates) Shabab Al Ahli
Al-Ittihad (Saudi Arabia)	1–0 (a.e.t.)	(United Arab Emirates) Al Wahda

Team 1	Agg.	Team 2	1st leg	2nd leg
East Region
Gangwon FC (South Korea)	0–1	(Japan) Machida Zelvia	0–0	0–1
FC Seoul (South Korea)	1–3	(Japan) Vissel Kobe	0–1	1–2
Johor Darul Ta'zim (Malaysia)	3–2	(Japan) Sanfrecce Hiroshima	3–1	0–1
Melbourne City (Australia)	1–1 (2–4 p)	(Thailand) Buriram United	1–1	0–0 (a.e.t.)

==== West Region ====
13 April 2026
17:45 UTC+3

Al-Ahli (Saudi Arabia)	1–0 (a.e.t.)	(Qatar) Al-Duhail
Mahrez 117'	Report

King Abdullah Sports City Stadium, Jeddah (Note: Due to the impacts from the 2026 Iran war, the AFC decided to play a one-legged tie.)
Attendance: 25,355
Referee: Ma Ning (China)

13 April 2026
21:00 UTC+3

Al-Hilal (Saudi Arabia)	3–3 (a.e.t.)	(Qatar) Al Sadd
Milinković-Savić 29'; S. Al-Dawsari 55'; Marcos Leonardo 67'	Report	Claudinho 36'; Mújica 58'; Firmino 70'
Penalties
Neves (penalty scored); Marcos Leonardo (penalty scored); Benzema (penalty missed); Bouabré (penalty missed)	2–4	(penalty missed) Firmino; (penalty scored) Soria; (penalty scored) Claudinho; (penalty scored) Mújica; (penalty scored) Afif

Prince Abdullah Al-Faisal Sports City Stadium, Jeddah
Attendance: 16,602
Referee: Shaun Evans (Australia)

14 April 2026
17:45 UTC+3

Tractor (Iran)	0–3	(United Arab Emirates) Shabab Al Ahli
	Report	Yuri César 65' (pen.); Ezatolahi 80'; Mateusão 90+8'

Prince Abdullah Al-Faisal Sports City Stadium, Jeddah
Attendance: 175
Referee: Yusuke Araki (Japan)

14 April 2026
21:00 UTC+3

Al-Ittihad (Saudi Arabia)	1–0 (a.e.t.)	(United Arab Emirates) Al Wahda
Fabinho 120+10' (pen.)	Report

King Abdullah Sports City Stadium, Jeddah
Attendance: 25,355
Referee: Ilgiz Tantashev (Uzbekistan)

==== East Region ====
3 March 2026
19:00 UTC+9

Gangwon FC (South Korea)	0–0	(Japan) Machida Zelvia
	Report

Chuncheon Songam Sports Town Stadium, Chuncheon
Attendance: 2,675
Referee: Ahmad A'Qashah (Singapore)
10 March 2026
19:00 UTC+9

Machida Zelvia (Japan)	1–0	(South Korea) Gangwon FC
Nakamura 25'	Report

Machida City Nozuta Park Stadium, Machida
Attendance: 4,345
Referee: Rustam Lutfullin (Uzbekistan)

Machida Zelvia won 1–0 on aggregate.

4 March 2026
19:00 UTC+9

FC Seoul (South Korea)	0–1	(Japan) Vissel Kobe
	Report	Thuler 23'

Seoul World Cup Stadium, Seoul
Attendance: 6,508
Referee: Mohammed Al-Hoaish (Saudi Arabia)
11 March 2026
19:00 UTC+9

Vissel Kobe (Japan)	2–1	(South Korea) FC Seoul
Osako 78'; Ideguchi 89'	Report	Klimala 20'

Kobe City Misaki Park Stadium, Kobe
Attendance: 14,750
Referee: Alireza Faghani (Australia)

Vissel Kobe won 3–1 on aggregate.

4 March 2026
20:15 UTC+8

Johor Darul Ta'zim (Malaysia)	3–1	(Japan) Sanfrecce Hiroshima
Aketxe 52'; Bérgson 63'; M. Guilherme 85'	Report	Nené 86' (o.g.)

Sultan Ibrahim Stadium, Johor Bahru
Attendance: 31,225
Referee: Shaun Evans (Australia)
11 March 2026
19:00 UTC+9

Sanfrecce Hiroshima (Japan)	1–0	(Malaysia) Johor Darul Ta'zim
Kinoshita 90' (pen.)	Report

Hiroshima Soccer Stadium, Hiroshima
Attendance: 11,128
Referee: Mohammed Al-Hoaish (Saudi Arabia)

Johor Darul Ta'zim won 3–2 on aggregate.

3 March 2026
18:45 UTC+11

Melbourne City (Australia)	1–1	(Thailand) Buriram United
Mazzeo 90+5'	Report	Bissoli 37'

Melbourne Rectangular Stadium, Melbourne
Attendance: 1,478
Referee: Khalid Al-Turais (Saudi Arabia)
10 March 2026
19:15 UTC+7

Buriram United (Thailand)	0–0 (a.e.t.)	(Australia) Melbourne City
	Report
Penalties
Čaušić (penalty scored); Schindler (penalty scored); P. Žulj (penalty scored); Dougall (penalty scored)	4–2	(penalty scored) Caputo; (penalty missed) Teague; (penalty missed) Behich; (penalty scored) Younis

Buriram Stadium, Buriram
Attendance: 22,950
Referee: Kim Jong-hyeok (South Korea)

1–1 on aggregate, Buriram United won 4–2 on penalties.

== Finals ==
The eight winners from the West and East Regions in the round of 16 advanced to the quarter-finals. The quarter-finals, semi-finals and final were held in Jeddah, Saudi Arabia from 17 to 25 April 2026.

The draw for the quarter-finals took place on 25 March 2026. As the West Region round of 16 fixtures were postponed by the AFC due to the impacts of the 2026 Iran war, participating clubs from the West Region had not yet been determined at the time of the draw. The AFC allocated placeholders for the West Region based on the results of the higher-seeded team in each round of 16 fixture, which meant if the team with the lower coefficient advanced, it simply took the seeding of its opponent.

Based on the league stage results, the two highest-ranked teams overall based on merit (i.e. all first-placed teams in each region are ranked above all second-placed teams, etc.), the winner of the tie between Al Hilal and Al Sadd from West Region and Machida Zelvia from the East region were allocated positions on opposite sides of the tournament bracket, with the draw determining the positions of the other six teams. The team with the highest overall ranking (Note: If the rank between the highest-seeded clubs overall by each region was equal, the club with the better overall result in the league stage was the highest-ranked team.) played in the first quarter-final, while the team with the second-highest overall ranking played in the third quarter-final. The remaining quarter-final fixtures were determined by an open draw, with each fixture featuring a team from the West and East Regions. The match pairings of the semi-finals and final were pre-determined.

Rank	Team	Grp	Pos	Pld	W	D	L	GF	GA	GD	Pts
1	(Japan) Machida Zelvia	E	1	8	5	2	1	15	7	+8	17
2	(Saudi Arabia) Al-Ahli	W	2	8	5	2	1	21	9	+12	17
3	(Japan) Vissel Kobe	E	2	8	5	1	2	14	7	+7	16
4	(Saudi Arabia) Al-Ittihad	W	4	8	5	0	3	22	9	+13	15
5	(Thailand) Buriram United	E	4	8	4	2	2	9	7	+2	14
6	(Malaysia) Johor Darul Ta'zim	E	6	8	3	2	3	9	8	+1	11
7	(United Arab Emirates) Shabab Al Ahli	W	6	8	3	2	3	14	14	0	11
8	(Qatar) Al-Sadd	W	8	8	2	2	4	12	16	−4	8

All times are local (AST).

=== Venues ===
The matches were played in two stadiums in the city of Jeddah.

Location of the venues of the 2026 AFC Champions League Elite Finals.

Jeddah
King Abdullah; Sports City Stadium	Prince Abdullah; Al-Faisal Sports City Stadium
Capacity: 62,345	Capacity: 27,000

=== Matches ===
==== Quarter-finals ====
16 April 2026
19:15

Al Sadd (Qatar)	3–3 (a.e.t.)	(Japan) Vissel Kobe
Mújica 6', 61'; Firmino 65'	Report	Osako 24'; Ideguchi 74'; Muto 90+3'
Penalties
Firmino (penalty scored); Soria (penalty scored); Claudinho (penalty missed); Khoukhi (penalty scored); Afif (penalty scored)	4–5	(penalty scored) Osako; (penalty scored) Muto; (penalty scored) Hidaka; (penalty scored) Nagato; (penalty scored) Jean Patric

Prince Abdullah Al-Faisal Sports City Stadium, Jeddah
Attendance: 1,212
Referee: Omar Al-Ali (United Arab Emirates)

17 April 2026
17:45

Al-Ahli (Saudi Arabia)	2–1	(Malaysia) Johor Darul Ta'zim
Kessié 45+3'; Galeno 54'	Report	Majrashi 19' (o.g.)

King Abdullah Sports City Stadium, Jeddah
Attendance: 40,506
Referee: Adham Makhadmeh (Jordan)

17 April 2026
21:00

Machida Zelvia (Japan)	1–0	(Saudi Arabia) Al-Ittihad
Yengi 31'	Report

Prince Abdullah Al-Faisal Sports City Stadium, Jeddah
Attendance: 16,917
Referee: Ma Ning (China)

18 April 2026
19:15

Buriram United (Thailand)	2–3 (a.e.t.)	(United Arab Emirates) Shabab Al Ahli
Bissoli 65'; P. Žulj 71'	Report	P. Žulj 14' (o.g.); Ezatolahi 50'; Renan 94'

Prince Abdullah Al-Faisal Sports City Stadium, Jeddah
Attendance: 227
Referee: Abdulrahman Al-Jassim (Qatar)

==== Semi-finals ====
20 April 2026
19:15

Vissel Kobe (Japan)	1–2	(Saudi Arabia) Al-Ahli
Muto 31'	Report	Galeno 62'; Toney 70'

King Abdullah Sports City Stadium, Jeddah
Attendance: 44,716
Referee: Ilgiz Tantashev (Uzbekistan)

21 April 2026
19:15

Machida Zelvia (Japan)	1–0	(United Arab Emirates) Shabab Al Ahli
Sōma 13'	Report

Prince Abdullah Al-Faisal Sports City Stadium, Jeddah
Attendance: 395
Referee: Shaun Evans (Australia)

==== Final ====
25 April 2026
19:15

Al-Ahli (Saudi Arabia)	1–0 (a.e.t.)	(Japan) Machida Zelvia
Al-Buraikan 96'	Report

King Abdullah Sports City Stadium, Jeddah
Attendance: 58,984
Referee: Ilgiz Tantashev (Uzbekistan)
