= 2025–26 AFC Champions League Elite =

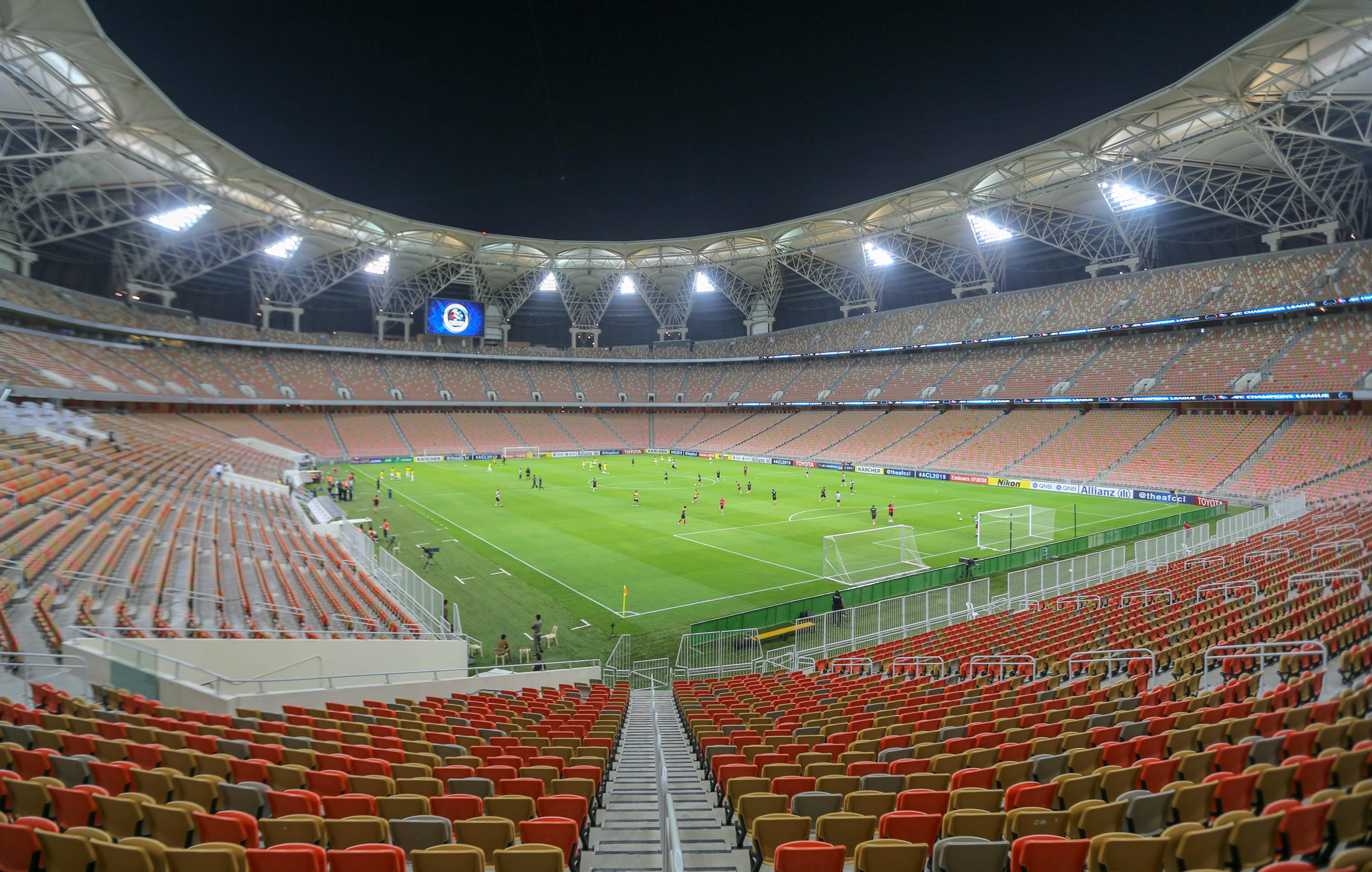
- The King Abdullah Sports City Stadium in Jeddah hosted the final

Tournament details
- Dates: Qualifying: 12 August 2025; Competition proper: 15 September 2025 – 25 April 2026
- Teams: Competition proper: 24 (from 12 associations)

Final positions
- Champions: (Saudi Arabia) Al-Ahli (2nd title)
- Runners-up: (Japan) Machida Zelvia

Tournament statistics
- Matches played: 115
- Goals scored: 303 (2.63 per match)
- Attendance: 1,461,893 (12,712 per match)
- Top scorer(s): Rafa Mújica (8 goals)
- Best player: Franck Kessié
- Best goalkeeper: Kōsei Tani

The 2025–26 AFC Champions League Elite (ACL Elite) was the 44th edition of Asia's premier club football tournament, organized by the Asian Football Confederation (AFC), and the second under the AFC Champions League Elite title.

The round of 16 for the West region (Note: Postponed and changed to single-leg format due to the impacts from the 2026 Iran War.) and the quarter-finals onwards were played as single-match knockout ties in Jeddah, Saudi Arabia (King Abdullah Sports City Stadium and Prince Abdullah Al-Faisal Sports City Stadium) from 13 to 25 April. The tournament winner qualified for the 2026 FIFA Intercontinental Cup and 2029 FIFA Club World Cup. Additionally, the winner entered the league stage of the 2026–27 AFC Champions League Elite, if not already qualified through their domestic performance.

Al-Ahli were the defending champions, having won their first title in the 2024–25 season. They successfully defended their title following a 1–0 victory after extra time against Machida Zelvia in the final.

== Association team allocation ==
The associations were allocated slots according to their club competitions ranking, which was published after the 2023–24 competitions were completed. Slots were subject to later re-balancing based on the 2024–25 competition results.

Participation for 2025–26 AFC Champions League Elite
Participating
Not participating

West Region (12 teams)
Rank		Member association	Points	Slots	
Rank		Member association	Points	League stage	Play-off
Region	AFC	Member association	Points	League stage	Play-off
1	1	Saudi Arabia	103.148	2 (+1 ACLE)	0
2	4	United Arab Emirates	74.873	2 (+1 ACL2)	0
3	5	Qatar	70.330	2	1
4	6	Iran	68.640	1	1
5	9	Uzbekistan	47.259	1	0
6	10	Iraq	37.118	1	0
Total		Participating associations: 6		11	2
Total		Participating associations: 6		13	

East Region (12 teams)
Rank		Member association	Points	Slots	
Rank		Member association	Points	League stage	Play-off
Region	AFC	Member association	Points	League stage	Play-off
1	2	Japan	96.999	3	0
2	3	South Korea	93.600	3	0
3	7	China	57.764	2	1
4	8	Thailand	49.546	1	1
5	11	Australia	34.703	1	0
6	12	Malaysia	31.331	1	0
Total		Participating associations: 6		11	2
Total		Participating associations: 6		13	

== Teams ==
In the following table, the number of appearances and last appearance count since the 2002–03 season, when the competition was rebranded as the AFC Champions League.

Entry round	West Region			East Region		
League stage	Team	Qualifying method	App. (last)	Team	Qualifying method	App. (last)
League stage	(Saudi Arabia) Al-Ahli	2024–25 AFC Champions League Elite winners	15th (2024–25)	(Japan) Vissel Kobe	2024 J1 League champions and 2024 Emperor's Cup winners	4th (2024–25)
League stage	(Saudi Arabia) Al-Ittihad	2024–25 Saudi Pro League champions and 2024–25 King's Cup winners	13th (2023–24)	(Japan) Sanfrecce Hiroshima	2024 J1 League runners-up	6th (2019)
League stage	(Saudi Arabia) Al-Hilal	2024–25 Saudi Pro League runners-up	21st (2024–25)	(Japan) Machida Zelvia	2024 J1 League third place	1st
League stage	(United Arab Emirates) Shabab Al Ahli	2024–25 UAE Pro League champions and 2024–25 UAE President's Cup winners	13th (2024–25)	(South Korea) Ulsan HD	2024 K League 1 champions	13th (2024–25)
League stage	(United Arab Emirates) Sharjah	2024–25 UAE Pro League runners-up 2024–25 AFC Champions League Two title holder	7th (2023–24)	(South Korea) Gangwon FC	2024 K League 1 runners-up	1st
League stage	(United Arab Emirates) Al Wahda	2024–25 UAE Pro League third place	13th (2021)	(South Korea) FC Seoul	2024 K League 1 fourth place	9th (2020)
League stage	(Qatar) Al Sadd	2024–25 Qatar Stars League champions	20th (2024–25)	(China) Shanghai Port	2024 Chinese Super League champions and 2024 Chinese FA Cup winners	9th (2024–25)
League stage	(Qatar) Al-Gharafa	2025 Emir of Qatar Cup winners	14th (2024–25)	(China) Shanghai Shenhua	2024 Chinese Super League runners-up	11th (2024–25)
League stage	(Iran) Tractor	2024–25 Persian Gulf Pro League champions	7th (2021)	(Thailand) Buriram United	2024–25 Thai League 1 champions 2024–25 Thai FA Cup champions	13th (2024–25)
League stage	(Uzbekistan) Nasaf	2024 Uzbekistan Super League champions	9th (2023–24)	(Australia) Melbourne City	2024–25 A-League Men regular season runners-up	3rd (2023–24)
League stage	(Iraq) Al-Shorta	2024–25 Iraq Stars League champions	7th (2024–25)	(Malaysia) Johor Darul Ta'zim	2024–25 Malaysia Super League champions	11th (2024–25)
Qualifying play-off participants	(Qatar) Al-Duhail	2024–25 Qatar Stars League runners-up	12th (2023–24)	(China) Chengdu Rongcheng	2024 Chinese Super League third place	1st
Qualifying play-off participants	(Iran) Sepahan	2024–25 Persian Gulf Pro League runners-up	16th (2024–25)	(Thailand) Bangkok United	2024–25 Thai League 1 runners-up	6th (2024–25)

Notes.

1. AFC Champions League Elite (ACLE): Al-Ahli qualified as the winners of the 2024–25 AFC Champions League Elite. They replaced the third-placed team in the 2024–25 Saudi Pro League.
2. Australia (AUS): As the 2024–25 A-League Men regular season champions were Auckland FC, a team from New Zealand, and therefore ineligible to participate in AFC club competitions, the spot reserved for the A-League Men regular season champions was transferred to the runners-up in the league, Melbourne City.
3. China (CHN): As the 2024 Chinese FA Cup winners Shanghai Port qualified for the Champions League Elite via their league position, the spot reserved for the Chinese FA Cup winners was transferred to the third-placed team in the 2024 Chinese Super League, Chengdu Rongcheng.
4. Japan (JPN): As the 2024 Emperor's Cup winners Vissel Kobe qualified for the Champions League Elite via their league position, the spot reserved for the Emperor's Cup winners was transferred to the third-placed team in the 2024 J1 League, Machida Zelvia.
5. South Korea (KOR): As the 2024 K League 1 third-placed team, Gimcheon Sangmu, were ineligible to qualify for AFC competitions, the spot was transferred to the fourth-placed team, FC Seoul.
6. Thailand (THA): As 2024–25 Thai FA Cup champions Buriram United qualified for the Champions League Elite via their league position, the spot reserved for the Thai FA Cup winners was transferred to the runners-up team in the 2024–25 Thai League 1, Bangkok United.

== Schedule ==
The quarter-finals for the West region were postponed due to the impacts from the 2026 Iran War.

The schedule of the competition was as follows.

Schedule for 2025–26 AFC Champions League Elite
Stage	Round	Draw date	West region	East region
Preliminary stage	Preliminary round	No draw	12 August 2025	
League stage	Matchday 1	15 August 2025	15–16 September 2025	16–17 September 2025
League stage	Matchday 2	15 August 2025	29–30 September 2025	30 September–1 October 2025
League stage	Matchday 3	15 August 2025	20–21 October 2025	21–22 October 2025
League stage	Matchday 4	15 August 2025	3–4 November 2025	4–5 November 2025
League stage	Matchday 5	15 August 2025	24–25 November 2025	25–26 November 2025
League stage	Matchday 6	15 August 2025	22–23 December 2025	9–10 December 2025
League stage	Matchday 7	15 August 2025	9–10 February 2026	10–11 February 2026
League stage	Matchday 8	15 August 2025	16–17 February 2026	17–18 February 2026
Round of 16		No draw (Note: Pre-determined format)	13–14 April 2026	3–11 March 2026
Finals	Quarter-finals	18 March 2026	16–18 April 2026	
Finals	Semi-finals	18 March 2026	20–21 April 2026	
Finals	Final	18 March 2026	25 April 2026 at King Abdullah Sports City Stadium, Jeddah	

== Qualifying play-offs ==
The two winners of the play-off round (one from West Region and one from East Region) advanced to the league stage to join the 22 direct entrants. The losers of the qualifying play-offs entered the group stage of the 2025–26 AFC Champions League Two.

Team 1	Score	Team 2
West Region
Al-Duhail (Qatar)	3–2	(Iran) Sepahan
East Region
Chengdu Rongcheng (China)	3–0	(Thailand) Bangkok United

=== West Region ===
12 August 2025
19:00 UTC+3

Al-Duhail (Qatar)	3–2	(Iran) Sepahan
Bamba 11'; Boulbina 24'; Piątek 33'	AFC Report; GSA Report	Hazbavi 3'; Zakipour 90+3'

Khalifa International Stadium, Al Rayyan
Attendance: 2,936
Referee: Abdullah Jamali (Kuwait)

=== East Region ===
12 August 2025
19:35 UTC+8

Chengdu Rongcheng (China)	3–0	(Thailand) Bangkok United
Yang Mingyang 68'; Felipe 71', 83'	AFC Report; GSA Report

Phoenix Hill Football Stadium, Chengdu
Attendance: 41,713
Referee: Alex King (Australia)

== League stage ==
The league phase draw took place on 15 August 2025 (at 17:00 UTC+8), in Kuala Lumpur, Malaysia.

Location of the 2025–26 AFC Champions League Elite league stage teams
Orange: East Region; Blue: West Region

Location of the 2025–26 AFC Champions League Elite league stage teams in Qatar and the United Arab Emirates.
Locations of the 2025–26 AFC Champions League Elite teams in Japan and South Korea.

=== West Region ===
Pos	Team	Pld	W	D	L	GF	GA	GD	Pts	Qualification
1	(Saudi Arabia) Al Hilal	8	7	1	0	17	6	+11	22	Advance to round of 16
2	(Saudi Arabia) Al-Ahli	8	5	2	1	21	9	+12	17	Advance to round of 16
3	(Iran) Tractor	8	5	2	1	12	4	+8	17	Advance to round of 16
4	(Saudi Arabia) Al-Ittihad	8	5	0	3	22	9	+13	15	Advance to round of 16
5	(United Arab Emirates) Al Wahda	8	4	2	2	11	7	+4	14	Advance to round of 16
6	(United Arab Emirates) Shabab Al Ahli	8	3	2	3	14	14	0	11	Advance to round of 16
7	(Qatar) Al-Duhail	8	2	2	4	16	16	0	8	Advance to round of 16
8	(Qatar) Al Sadd	8	2	2	4	12	16	−4	8	Advance to round of 16
9	(United Arab Emirates) Sharjah	8	2	2	4	8	16	−8	8	
10	(Qatar) Al-Gharafa	8	2	0	6	7	21	−14	6	
11	(Iraq) Al-Shorta	8	1	2	5	6	20	−14	5	
12	(Uzbekistan) Nasaf	8	1	1	6	9	17	−8	4	

Source: AFC
Rules for classification: 1) points; 2) goal difference; 3) number of goals scored; 4) number of matches won; 5) penalty shoot-out if only two teams remain tied and played each other on the final matchday 6) fair play ranking; 7) drawing of lots

Matchday 1
Home team	Score	Away team
Sharjah (United Arab Emirates)	4–3	(Qatar) Al-Gharafa
Al Wahda (United Arab Emirates)	2–1	(Saudi Arabia) Al-Ittihad
Al-Ahli (Saudi Arabia)	4–2	(Uzbekistan) Nasaf
Al-Shorta (Iraq)	1–1	(Qatar) Al Sadd
Shabab Al Ahli (United Arab Emirates)	1–1	(Iran) Tractor
Al-Hilal (Saudi Arabia)	2–1	(Qatar) Al-Duhail

Matchday 2
Home team	Score	Away team
Nasaf (Uzbekistan)	2–3	(Saudi Arabia) Al-Hilal
Al-Gharafa (Qatar)	2–0	(Iraq) Al-Shorta
Tractor (Iran)	0–0	(United Arab Emirates) Al Wahda
Al-Duhail (Qatar)	2–2	(Saudi Arabia) Al-Ahli
Al Sadd (Qatar)	1–1	(United Arab Emirates) Sharjah
Al-Ittihad (Saudi Arabia)	0–1	(United Arab Emirates) Shabab Al Ahli

Matchday 3
Home team	Score	Away team
Al Wahda (United Arab Emirates)	3–1	(Qatar) Al-Duhail
Sharjah (United Arab Emirates)	0–5	(Iran) Tractor
Al-Shorta (Iraq)	1–4	(Saudi Arabia) Al-Ittihad
Al-Ahli (Saudi Arabia)	4–0	(Qatar) Al-Gharafa
Shabab Al Ahli (United Arab Emirates)	4–1	(Uzbekistan) Nasaf
Al-Hilal (Saudi Arabia)	3–1	(Qatar) Al Sadd

Matchday 4
Home team	Score	Away team
Nasaf (Uzbekistan)	1–2	(United Arab Emirates) Al Wahda
Tractor (Iran)	1–0	(Iraq) Al-Shorta
Al-Duhail (Qatar)	4–1	(United Arab Emirates) Shabab Al Ahli
Al-Gharafa (Qatar)	1–2	(Saudi Arabia) Al-Hilal
Al Sadd (Qatar)	1–2	(Saudi Arabia) Al-Ahli
Al-Ittihad (Saudi Arabia)	3–0	(United Arab Emirates) Sharjah

Matchday 5
Home team	Score	Away team
Nasaf (Uzbekistan)	0–1	(Iran) Tractor
Shabab Al Ahli (United Arab Emirates)	2–0	(Qatar) Al-Gharafa
Al-Duhail (Qatar)	4–2	(Saudi Arabia) Al-Ittihad
Al-Ahli (Saudi Arabia)	0–1	(United Arab Emirates) Sharjah
Al Wahda (United Arab Emirates)	3–1	(Qatar) Al Sadd
Al-Hilal (Saudi Arabia)	4–0	(Iraq) Al-Shorta

Matchday 6
Home team	Score	Away team
Sharjah (United Arab Emirates)	0–1	(Saudi Arabia) Al-Hilal
Tractor (Iran)	2–1	(Qatar) Al-Duhail
Al-Shorta (Iraq)	0–5	(Saudi Arabia) Al-Ahli
Al-Gharafa (Qatar)	1–0	(United Arab Emirates) Al Wahda
Al Sadd (Qatar)	4–2	(United Arab Emirates) Shabab Al Ahli
Al-Ittihad (Saudi Arabia)	1–0	(Uzbekistan) Nasaf

Matchday 7
Home team	Score	Away team
Nasaf (Uzbekistan)	1–1	(Iraq) Al-Shorta
Al Wahda (United Arab Emirates)	0–0	(Saudi Arabia) Al-Ahli
Shabab Al Ahli (United Arab Emirates)	0–0	(Saudi Arabia) Al-Hilal
Al-Duhail (Qatar)	1–1	(United Arab Emirates) Sharjah
Tractor (Iran)	0–2	(Qatar) Al Sadd
Al-Ittihad (Saudi Arabia)	7–0	(Qatar) Al-Gharafa

Matchday 8
Home team	Score	Away team
Sharjah (United Arab Emirates)	1–2	(Uzbekistan) Nasaf
Al-Ahli (Saudi Arabia)	4–3	(United Arab Emirates) Shabab Al Ahli
Al-Hilal (Saudi Arabia)	2–1	(United Arab Emirates) Al Wahda
Al-Shorta (Iraq)	3–2	(Qatar) Al-Duhail
Al Sadd (Qatar)	1–4	(Saudi Arabia) Al-Ittihad
Al-Gharafa (Qatar)	0–2	(Iran) Tractor

=== East Region ===
Pos	Team	Pld	W	D	L	GF	GA	GD	Pts	Qualification
1	(Japan) Machida Zelvia	8	5	2	1	15	7	+8	17	Advance to round of 16
2	(Japan) Vissel Kobe	8	5	1	2	14	7	+7	16	Advance to round of 16
3	(Japan) Sanfrecce Hiroshima	8	4	3	1	10	6	+4	15	Advance to round of 16
4	(Thailand) Buriram United	8	4	2	2	10	8	+2	14	Advance to round of 16
5	(Australia) Melbourne City	8	4	2	2	9	7	+2	14	Advance to round of 16
6	(Malaysia) Johor Darul Ta'zim	8	3	2	3	8	7	+1	11	Advance to round of 16
7	(South Korea) FC Seoul	8	2	4	2	10	9	+1	10	Advance to round of 16
8	(South Korea) Gangwon FC	8	2	3	3	9	11	−2	9	Advance to round of 16
9	(South Korea) Ulsan HD	8	2	3	3	6	8	−2	9	
10	(China) Chengdu Rongcheng	8	1	3	4	7	11	−4	6	
11	(China) Shanghai Shenhua	8	1	1	6	5	13	−8	4	
12	(China) Shanghai Port	8	0	4	4	2	11	−9	4	

Source: AFC
Rules for classification: 1) points; 2) goal difference; 3) number of goals scored; 4) number of matches won; 5) penalty shoot-out if only two teams remain tied and played each other on the final matchday 6) fair play ranking; 7) drawing of lots

Matchday 1
Home team	Score	Away team
Melbourne City (Australia)	0–2	(Japan) Sanfrecce Hiroshima
Gangwon FC (South Korea)	2–1	(China) Shanghai Shenhua
Machida Zelvia (Japan)	1–1	(South Korea) FC Seoul
Buriram United (Thailand)	2–1	(Malaysia) Johor Darul Ta'zim
Ulsan HD (South Korea)	2–1	(China) Chengdu Rongcheng
Shanghai Port (China)	0–3	(Japan) Vissel Kobe

Matchday 2
Home team	Score	Away team
Sanfrecce Hiroshima (Japan)	1–1	(China) Shanghai Port
FC Seoul (South Korea)	3–0	(Thailand) Buriram United
Chengdu Rongcheng (China)	1–0	(South Korea) Gangwon FC
Johor Darul Ta'zim (Malaysia)	0–0	(Japan) Machida Zelvia
Vissel Kobe (Japan)	1–0	(Australia) Melbourne City
Shanghai Shenhua (China)	1–1	(South Korea) Ulsan HD

Matchday 3
Home team	Score	Away team
Melbourne City (Australia)	2–1	(Thailand) Buriram United
Ulsan HD (South Korea)	1–0	(Japan) Sanfrecce Hiroshima
Chengdu Rongcheng (China)	0–2	(Malaysia) Johor Darul Ta'zim
Shanghai Port (China)	0–2	(Japan) Machida Zelvia
Gangwon FC (South Korea)	4–3	(Japan) Vissel Kobe
Shanghai Shenhua (China)	2–0	(South Korea) FC Seoul

Matchday 4
Home team	Score	Away team
Sanfrecce Hiroshima (Japan)	1–0	(South Korea) Gangwon FC
Machida Zelvia (Japan)	1–2	(Australia) Melbourne City
FC Seoul (South Korea)	0–0	(China) Chengdu Rongcheng
Buriram United (Thailand)	2–0	(China) Shanghai Port
Vissel Kobe (Japan)	1–0	(South Korea) Ulsan HD
Johor Darul Ta'zim (Malaysia)	3–1	(China) Shanghai Shenhua

Matchday 5
Home team	Score	Away team
Melbourne City (Australia)	2–0	(Malaysia) Johor Darul Ta'zim
Gangwon FC (South Korea)	1–3	(Japan) Machida Zelvia
Shanghai Port (China)	1–3	(South Korea) FC Seoul
Chengdu Rongcheng (China)	1–1	(Japan) Sanfrecce Hiroshima
Ulsan HD (South Korea)	0–0	(Thailand) Buriram United
Shanghai Shenhua (China)	0–2	(Japan) Vissel Kobe

Matchday 6
Home team	Score	Away team
Vissel Kobe (Japan)	2–2	(China) Chengdu Rongcheng
Machida Zelvia (Japan)	3–1	(South Korea) Ulsan HD
Buriram United (Thailand)	2–2	(South Korea) Gangwon FC
Johor Darul Ta'zim (Malaysia)	0–0	(China) Shanghai Port
Sanfrecce Hiroshima (Japan)	1–0	(China) Shanghai Shenhua
FC Seoul (South Korea)	1–1	(Australia) Melbourne City

Matchday 7
Home team	Score	Away team
Vissel Kobe (Japan)	2–0	(South Korea) FC Seoul
Sanfrecce Hiroshima (Japan)	2–1	(Malaysia) Johor Darul Ta'zim
Shanghai Shenhua (China)	0–2	(Japan) Machida Zelvia
Chengdu Rongcheng (China)	0–1	(Thailand) Buriram United
Ulsan HD (South Korea)	1–2	(Australia) Melbourne City
Gangwon FC (South Korea)	0–0	(China) Shanghai Port

Matchday 8
Home team	Score	Away team
Machida Zelvia (Japan)	3–2	(China) Chengdu Rongcheng
FC Seoul (South Korea)	2–2	(Japan) Sanfrecce Hiroshima
Buriram United (Thailand)	2–0	(China) Shanghai Shenhua
Johor Darul Ta'zim (Malaysia)	1–0	(Japan) Vissel Kobe
Shanghai Port (China)	0–0	(South Korea) Ulsan HD
Melbourne City (Australia)	0–0	(South Korea) Gangwon FC

== Knockout stage ==
=== Bracket ===
Round of 16
13 April – Jeddah (Al-Faisal)
W1	(Saudi Arabia) Al Hilal	3 (2)
W8	(Qatar) Al Sadd (p)	3 (4)
E7	(South Korea) FC Seoul	0	1	1
E2	(Japan) Vissel Kobe	1	2	3
13 April – Jeddah (King Abdullah)
W2	(Saudi Arabia) Al-Ahli (a.e.t.)	1
W7	(Qatar) Al-Duhail	0
E6	(Malaysia) Johor Darul Ta'zim	3	0	3
E3	(Japan) Sanfrecce Hiroshima	1	1	2
E8	(South Korea) Gangwon FC	0	0	0
E1	(Japan) Machida Zelvia	0	1	1
14 April – Jeddah (King Abdullah)
W4	(Saudi Arabia) Al-Ittihad (a.e.t.)	1
W5	(United Arab Emirates) Al Wahda	0
E5	(Australia) Melbourne City	1	0	1 (2)
E4	(Thailand) Buriram United (p)	1	0	1 (4)
14 April – Jeddah (Al-Faisal)
W3	(Iran) Tractor	0
W6	(United Arab Emirates) Shabab Al Ahli	3

Quarter-finals
16 April – Jeddah (Al-Faisal)
W8	(Qatar) Al Sadd	3 (4)
E2	(Japan) Vissel Kobe (p)	3 (5)
17 April – Jeddah (King Abdullah)
W2	(Saudi Arabia) Al-Ahli	2
E6	(Malaysia) Johor Darul Ta'zim	1
17 April – Jeddah (Al-Faisal)
E1	(Japan) Machida Zelvia	1
W4	(Saudi Arabia) Al-Ittihad	0
18 April – Jeddah (Al-Faisal)
E4	(Thailand) Buriram United	2
W6	(United Arab Emirates) Shabab Al Ahli (a.e.t.)	3

Semi-finals
20 April – Jeddah (King Abdullah)
E2	(Japan) Vissel Kobe	1
W2	(Saudi Arabia) Al-Ahli	2
21 April – Jeddah (Al-Faisal)
E1	(Japan) Machida Zelvia	1
W6	(United Arab Emirates) Shabab Al Ahli	0

Final
25 April – Jeddah (King Abdullah)
W2	(Saudi Arabia) Al-Ahli (a.e.t.)	1
E1	(Japan) Machida Zelvia	0

=== Round of 16 ===
The first legs for the East Region were played on 3 and 4 March, with the second legs played on 10 and 11 March.

The West Region round of 16 fixtures (originally scheduled for March 2026) were postponed by the AFC due to the impacts from the 2026 Iran war. The format changed to single-leg ties, held on 13 and 14 April in Jeddah, Saudi Arabia.

Team 1	Score	Team 2
West Region
Al Hilal (Saudi Arabia)	3–3 (a.e.t.) (2–4 p)	(Qatar) Al Sadd
Al-Ahli (Saudi Arabia)	1–0 (a.e.t.)	(Qatar) Al-Duhail
Tractor (Iran)	0–3	(United Arab Emirates) Shabab Al Ahli
Al-Ittihad (Saudi Arabia)	1–0 (a.e.t.)	(United Arab Emirates) Al Wahda

Team 1	Agg.	Team 2	1st leg	2nd leg
East Region
Gangwon FC (South Korea)	0–1	(Japan) Machida Zelvia	0–0	0–1
FC Seoul (South Korea)	1–3	(Japan) Vissel Kobe	0–1	1–2
Johor Darul Ta'zim (Malaysia)	3–2	(Japan) Sanfrecce Hiroshima	3–1	0–1
Melbourne City (Australia)	1–1 (2–4 p)	(Thailand) Buriram United	1–1	0–0 (a.e.t.)

=== Finals ===
The quarter-finals, semi-finals and final, all as single-legged ties, are being held in Jeddah, Saudi Arabia between 16 and 25 April 2026.

==== Quarter-finals ====
16 April 2026
19:15

Al Sadd (Qatar)	3–3 (a.e.t.)	(Japan) Vissel Kobe
Mújica 6', 61'; Firmino 65'	Report	Osako 24'; Ideguchi 74'; Muto 90+3'
Penalties
Firmino (penalty scored); Soria (penalty scored); Claudinho (penalty missed); Khoukhi (penalty scored); Afif (penalty scored)	4–5	(penalty scored) Osako; (penalty scored) Muto; (penalty scored) Hidaka; (penalty scored) Nagato; (penalty scored) Jean Patric

Prince Abdullah Al-Faisal Sports City Stadium, Jeddah
Attendance: 1,212
Referee: Omar Al-Ali (United Arab Emirates)

17 April 2026
17:45

Al-Ahli (Saudi Arabia)	2–1	(Malaysia) Johor Darul Ta'zim
Kessié 45+3'; Galeno 54'	Report	Majrashi 19' (o.g.)

King Abdullah Sports City Stadium, Jeddah
Attendance: 40,506
Referee: Adham Makhadmeh (Jordan)

17 April 2026
21:00

Machida Zelvia (Japan)	1–0	(Saudi Arabia) Al-Ittihad
Yengi 31'	Report

Prince Abdullah Al-Faisal Sports City Stadium, Jeddah
Attendance: 16,917
Referee: Ma Ning (China)

18 April 2026
19:15

Buriram United (Thailand)	2–3 (a.e.t.)	(United Arab Emirates) Shabab Al Ahli
Bissoli 65'; P. Žulj 71'	Report	P. Žulj 14' (o.g.); Ezatolahi 50'; Renan 94'

Prince Abdullah Al-Faisal Sports City Stadium, Jeddah
Attendance: 227
Referee: Abdulrahman Al-Jassim (Qatar)

==== Semi-finals ====
20 April 2026
19:15

Vissel Kobe (Japan)	1–2	(Saudi Arabia) Al-Ahli
Muto 31'	Report	Galeno 62'; Toney 70'

King Abdullah Sports City Stadium, Jeddah
Attendance: 44,716
Referee: Ilgiz Tantashev (Uzbekistan)

21 April 2026
19:15

Machida Zelvia (Japan)	1–0	(United Arab Emirates) Shabab Al Ahli
Sōma 13'	Report

Prince Abdullah Al-Faisal Sports City Stadium, Jeddah
Attendance: 395
Referee: Shaun Evans (Australia)

==== Final ====
25 April 2026
19:15

Al-Ahli (Saudi Arabia)	1–0 (a.e.t.)	(Japan) Machida Zelvia
Al-Buraikan 96'	Report

King Abdullah Sports City Stadium, Jeddah
Attendance: 58,984
Referee: Ilgiz Tantashev (Uzbekistan)

== Top scorers ==
Team eliminated for this round / inactive for this round / Matches voided by AFC / Player left the team

Rank	Player	Team	MD1	MD2	MD3	MD4	MD5	MD6	MD7	MD8	R16-1	R16-2	QF	SF	F	Total
1	(Spain) Rafa Mújica	(Qatar) Al Sadd						3	1	1	1		2			8
2	(Algeria) Adil Boulbina	(Qatar) Al-Duhail	1			1	3		1							6
2	(Algeria) Houssem Aouar	(Saudi Arabia) Al-Ittihad			2				3	1						6
4	(France) Karim Benzema	(Saudi Arabia) Al-Ittihad / (Saudi Arabia) Al Hilal				1	2	1								4
4	(Serbia) Sergej Milinković-Savić	(Saudi Arabia) Al Hilal		1	1		1				1					4
4	(Brazil) Marcos Leonardo	(Saudi Arabia) Al Hilal		1			2				1					4
4	(France) Enzo Millot	(Saudi Arabia) Al-Ahli	2		1					1						4
4	(Algeria) Riyad Mahrez	(Saudi Arabia) Al-Ahli	1	1		1					1					4
4	(Brazil) Roberto Firmino	(Qatar) Al Sadd			1				1		1		1			4
4	(Poland) Krzysztof Piątek	(Qatar) Al-Duhail		1	1		1			1						4
4	(Brazil) Breno Cascardo	(United Arab Emirates) Shabab Al Ahli			1	1				2						4
4	(Brazil) Felipe	(China) Chengdu Rongcheng					1	2		1						4
4	(Japan) Yoshinori Muto	(Japan) Vissel Kobe						1	1				1	1		4
4	(Japan) Yuki Soma	(Japan) Machida Zelvia			1				2					1		4

Note

- Goals scored in the qualifying play-offs and matches voided by AFC are not counted when determining top scorer (Regulations Article 64.4)

== See also ==
- 2025–26 AFC Champions League Two
- 2025–26 AFC Challenge League
- 2025–26 AFC Women's Champions League
