= Edion Peace Wing Hiroshima =

Football stadium, home of Sanfrecce Hiroshima

Hiroshima Soccer Stadium Edion Peace Wing Hiroshima
- エディオンピースウイング広島
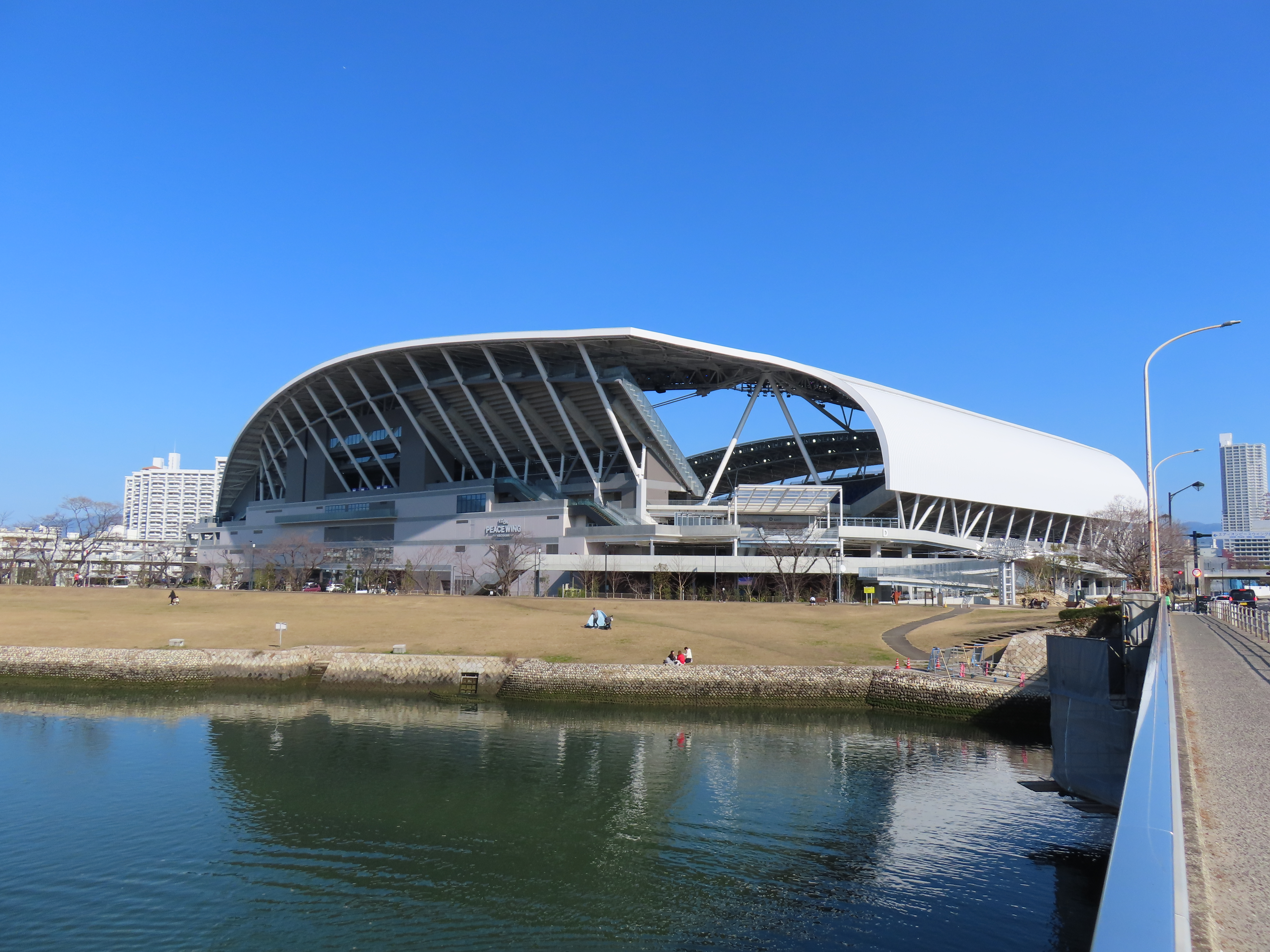
- The stadium viewed from Sorazaya Bridge (February 2024)
- Interactive map of Hiroshima Soccer Stadium; Edion Peace Wing Hiroshima
- Address: Motomachi, Naka-ku, Hiroshima, 730-0011
- Location: Hiroshima, Japan
- Coordinates: 34°24′6″N 132°27′14″E
- Owner: Hiroshima City
- Operator: Sanfrecce Hiroshima Co. Ltd.
- Seating type: Stadium seating
- Capacity: 28,520
- Type: Stadium
- Event: Sporting events
- Surface: Grass
- Record attendance: 27,624 (Sanfrecce Hiroshima–JEF United Chiba, 8 August 2026)
- Field size: 105 by 68 metres (114.8 yd × 74.4 yd)
- Public transit: JR West: R Sanyo Main Line; B Kabe Line at Shin-Hakushima Station, Yokogawa Station or Hiroshima Station; Hiroshima Rapid Transit: Astram Line at Shin-Hakushima and Kenchō-mae Station; Hiroshima Electric Railway: Kamiya-cho-nishi Station; Genbaku Dome-mae Station

Construction
- Built: February 2022–December 2023
- Opened: 1 February 2024
- Cost: ¥27.1 billion (US$171.18 million)
- Main contractor: A consortium led by Taisei Corporation

Tenants
- Sanfrecce Hiroshima; Sanfrecce Hiroshima Regina

Website
- Edion Peace Wing website

The Hiroshima Soccer Stadium (広島サッカースタジアム, Hiroshima Sakkā Sutajiamu), currently known as Edion Peace Wing Hiroshima (エディオンピースウイング広島, Edion Pīsu Uingu Hiroshima) for sponsorship reasons, is a football stadium in Hiroshima, Japan, which has a seating capacity of 28,520. It has been the home of Sanfrecce Hiroshima and Sanfrecce Hiroshima Regina since 2024.

== History ==
Sanfrecce Hiroshima had played their home games at the multi-purpose Hiroshima Big Arch stadium since 1992, but there had been ideas for a new, football-specific stadium to be built since the early 2000s. In February 2003, Mayor Tadatoshi Akiba promised that a stadium would be built, however nothing initially came to fruition.

Following the success of the football team in the early 2010s, winning the 2012, 2013 and 2015 J1 League titles, plans to build a new stadium were once again brought to the fore. In August 2012, Sanfrecce Hiroshima and their supporters association submitted a request to Hiroshima Prefecture and Hiroshima City for the construction of a new stadium. This was followed in January 2013 by approximately 370,000 people signing a petition supporting the cause.

In September 2013, a list of nine potential locations for a new stadium was drawn up by the review committee.

1. Central Park Freedom/Lawn Square (Naka Ward)
2. Former Hiroshima Municipal Stadium site (Naka Ward)
3. Hiroshima Minato Park (Minami Ward)
4. Dejima Higashi No. 2 open storage area (Minami Ward)
5. Prefectural Hiroshima Nishi Air Base site (Nishi Ward)
6. Prefectural General Ground (Nishi Ward)
7. Hiroshima Regional Park (Asaminami Ward)
8. Itsukaichi Landfill (Saeki Ward)
9. Presentation of site for exchange facilities such as trade fairs and conventions (Minami Ward)

In March 2016, Sanfrecce Hiroshima announced its own plan to build a stadium on the Hiroshima Municipal Stadium site, but Hiroshima City and the club agreed to reconsider later in the year. In February 2019, it was decided that the stadium would be built in the central park, within walking distance of the A-Bomb Dome and adjacent to Hiroshima Castle.

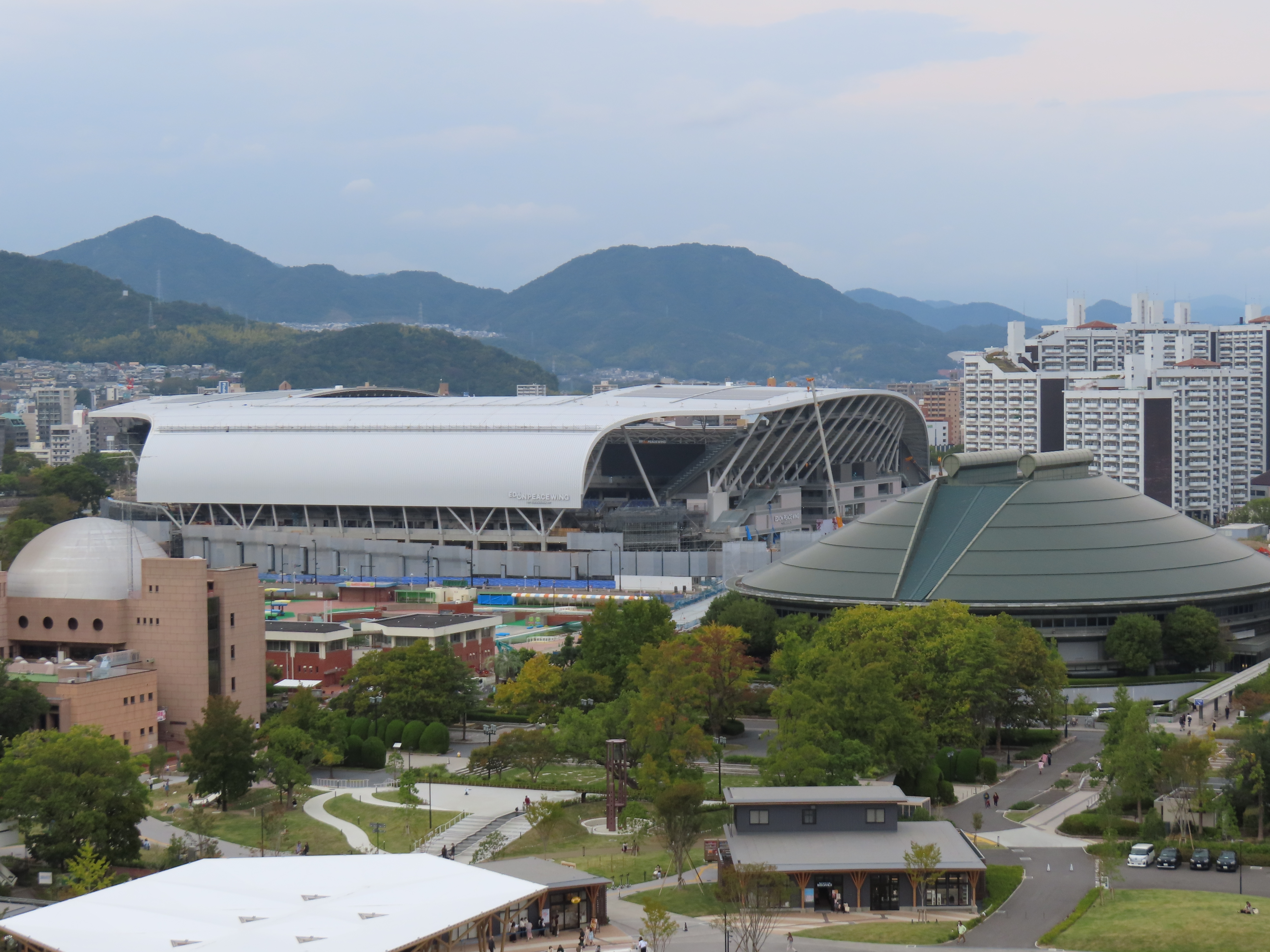
Stadium under construction in October 2023

In March 2021, a consortium of eight entities led by Taisei Corporation was selected as the contractors and work got underway in February 2022. The site was officially opened on 1 February 2024 with a small ceremony at the stadium. The construction cost is estimated at ¥27.1 billion.

The inaugural game was a club friendly between Sanfrecce Hiroshima and Gamba Osaka on 10 February 2024, which the home team lost 1–2. The first competitive game was played on 23 February 2024 against Urawa Red Diamonds, with the hosts winning 2–0 and Yuki Ohashi scoring the first goal in the new stadium. Sanfrecce Hiroshima Regina played their first match at the new stadium on 3 March 2024, in a 2–1 league defeat to Albirex Niigata Ladies. The match had an attendance of over 4,600, the highest attendance of a home game for Regina in their history.

== Structure and facilities ==
Edion Peace Wing Hiroshima has a site area of approximately 49,900 square metres, with the stadium itself having a capacity of 28,520. The building is approximately 42 metres high and is constructed of steel reinforced concrete and some steel frame construction. The stadium has a football-specific layout, with only about 8 metres separating the pitch and stands. For comparison, Sanfrecce's previous stadium's pitch was 30 to 40 metres away. The stadium's white saddle roof arches high over the south stand and slopes down to the north stand opposite. It has indentations in the corners on the south side and a pronounced depression in the north part, which was inspired by the "wings of hope" that symbolises Hiroshima.

=== Stands ===
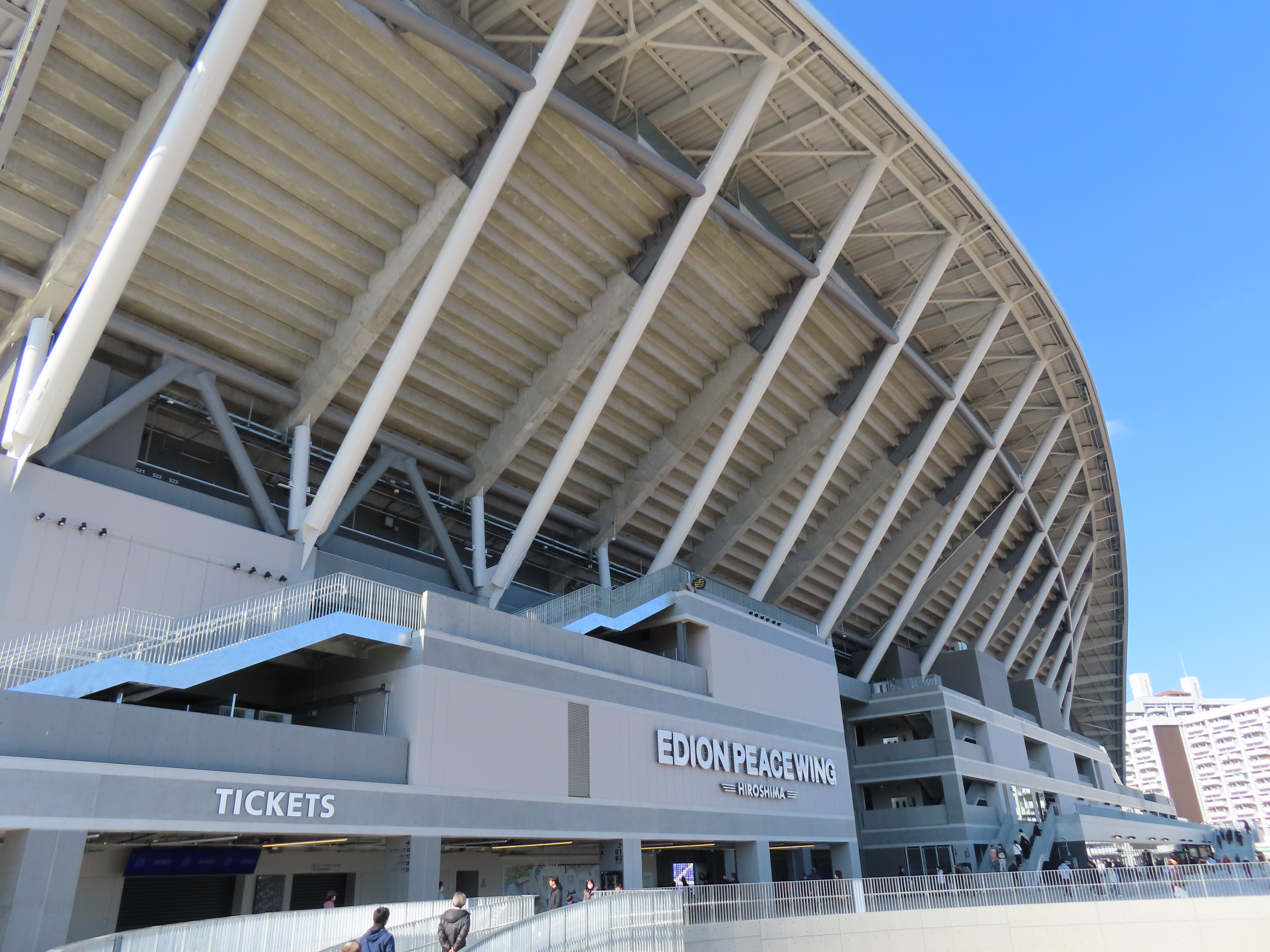
Edion Peace Wing Hiroshima East Stand

There are four stands in the north, south, east, and west, each with a different design, that surround the pitch on all sides. Along the sides, the stands consist of two tiers, with a narrow tier in-between. A tall, single-tier stand is located behind the south goal and is dedicated to the home fans, with a capacity of 6,200. The north stand, which has municipal housing in the background, is for visitors and has a limited capacity of 2,200 in consideration of noise. The seats are irregularly arranged in colours of ultramarine, blue, and grey. They were provided by manufacturer Iris Ohyama. A large 9 by 32 metre screen is installed on the north stand, which is the same size as the Japan National Stadium. The south side has a clock and timing device measuring 9 by 16 metres. There is also a 380 metre long belt shaped screen in front of the fourth-floor seating around the stadium.

=== Pitch ===
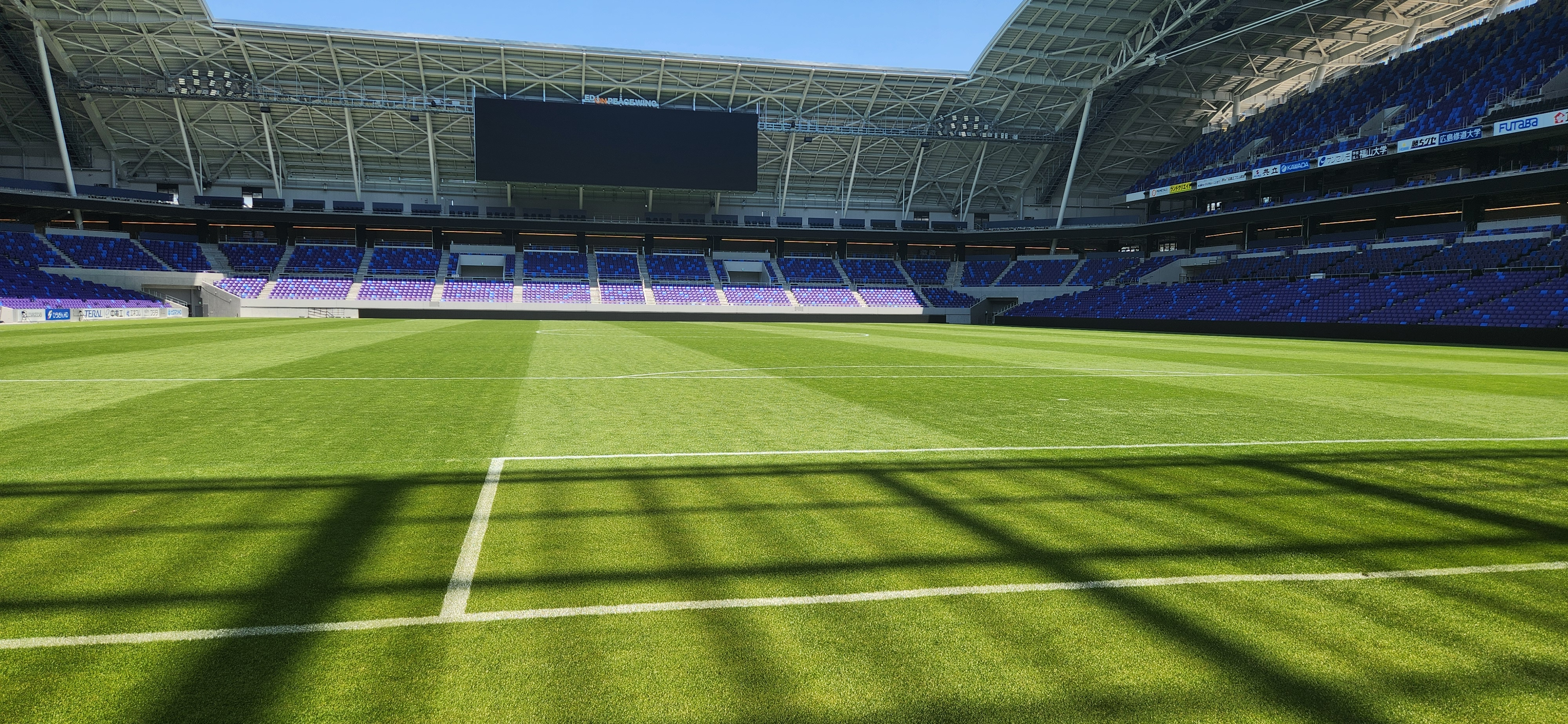
Pitch at Edion Peace Wing Hiroshima

The entire field is 121 by 84 metres, with a natural grass area of 110 by 71 metres. The pitch itself measures 105 by 68 metres and is located on a north–south axis.

=== Facilities ===
The venue has VIP boxes, business seats, catering facilities as well as a museum, restaurants and shops to attract visitors outside of match days. The area to the east of the stadium is to be equipped with green spaces, trees and fountains. It retains its recreational function and is accessible to all residents. The project also includes the construction of pedestrian bridges over the adjacent streets and the creation of a small marina on the nearby arm of the Ōta River. Additionally, there is an 8 by 2 metre mural called 'Peace Wall', drawn by Yoichi Takahashi, the original author of Captain Tsubasa.

== Naming rights ==
The name of the stadium according to the ordinance is Hiroshima Soccer Stadium. In order to secure funding, the naming rights were put out to tender in March 2020 for companies that have a head office, branch office, or equivalent business office in Hiroshima prefecture. Electronics retailer EDION Corporation acquired the naming rights for a fee of ¥100 million per year. The agreement runs for 10 years, starting on 1 February 2024 and ending on 31 January 2034.

== Transport ==
=== Train ===
- Approximately 15 minutes walk from Shin-Hakushima Station, approximately 20 minutes walk from Yokogawa Station, and approximately 30 minutes walk from Hiroshima Station, all on the JR West Sanyo Main Line (Hiroshima Station also being a stop for the Sanyo Shinkansen Line).
- Approximately 10 minutes walk from Kenchō-mae Station on the Hiroshima Rapid Transit Astram Line, approximately 15 minutes walk from Shin-Hakushima Station.
- 10 minutes walk from Hiroshima Electric Railway Genbaku Dome-mae Station tram stop, 10 minutes walk from Kamiya-cho-nishi Station tram stop.

=== Bus ===
- Approximately 10 minutes walk from Hiroshima Bus Center

=== Car ===
- Approximately 20 minutes from San'yō Expressway Hiroshima Interchange

== See also ==
- Lists of stadiums
- List of football stadiums in Japan
- List of stadiums in Japan
