= Agustín Soria =

Uruguayan footballer (born 2004)

Personal information
- Full name: Agustín Nicolas Soría Silvera
- Date of birth: 30 November 2004 (age 21)
- Place of birth: Montevideo, Uruguay
- Height: 1.74 m (5 ft 9 in)
- Position: Midfielder

Team information
- Current team: Al Sadd
- Number: 80

Youth career
- –2023: Defensor Sporting

Senior career*
Years	Team	Apps	(Gls)
2023–2025	Defensor Sporting	47	(3)
2025–	Al Sadd	11	(1)
- * Club domestic league appearances and goals as of 17 January 2026

Agustín Nicolas Soría Silvera (born 30 November 2004) is a Uruguayan professional footballer who plays as a midfielder for Qatar Stars League club Al Sadd.

== Early life ==
Soría was born on 30 November 2004. Born in Montevideo, Uruguay, he has an older brother and a younger brother.

== Career ==
As a youth player, he joined the youth academy of Uruguayan side Defensor Sporting, where he played in the U-20 Copa Libertadores, and was promoted to the club's senior team ahead of the 2024 season, where he made forty-seven league appearances and scored three goals and helped them win the 2023 Copa Uruguay and the 2024 Copa Uruguay. Uruguayan newspaper El País wrote in 2024 that he was a "mainstay for the violet team" while playing for them. Following his stint there, he signed for Qatari side Al Sadd during the summer of 2025.
