= Breno (footballer, born 2003) =

Brazilian footballer (born 2003)

Personal information
- Full name: Breno Cascardo Lemos
- Date of birth: 25 September 2003 (age 23)
- Place of birth: Rio de Janeiro, Brazil
- Height: 1.83 m (6 ft 0 in)
- Position: Defensive midfielder

Team information
- Current team: Shabab Al Ahli
- Number: 80

Youth career
- 2018–2022: Palmeiras
- 2021–2022: → Ibrachina (loan)
- 2022–2023: América Mineiro

Senior career*
Years	Team	Apps	(Gls)
2023–2024	América Mineiro	24	(1)
2024–	Shabab Al Ahli	39	(2)
- * Club domestic league appearances and goals as of 13:58, 1 August 2024 (UTC)

Breno Cascardo Lemos (born 25 September 2003), simply known as Breno, is a Brazilian professional footballer who plays as a defensive midfielder for Shabab Al Ahli.

== Career ==
Born in Rio de Janeiro, Breno joined Palmeiras' youth categories in 2018, aged 15. In August 2021, he was loaned to Ibrachina, being regularly used in their under-20 side; on 4 November, his loan was extended until the following January.

Upon returning to Palmeiras in January 2022, Breno was released in July, and signed a contract with América Mineiro in August. On 30 January 2023, he renewed his link with the latter until the end of 2025.

Breno made his first team debut for Coelho on 17 May 2023, starting in a 2–0 home win over Internacional, in that year's Copa do Brasil. He scored on his Série A debut three days later, netting the opener in a 2–1 home success over Fortaleza.

== Career statistics ==
As of 26 September 2023

Club	Season	League			State League		Cup		Continental		Other		Total	
Club	Season	Division	Apps	Goals	Apps	Goals	Apps	Goals	Apps	Goals	Apps	Goals	Apps	Goals
América Mineiro	2023	Série A	16	1	0	0	2	0	6 (Note: Appearance(s) in Copa Sudamericana)	2	—		24	3
Career total			16	1	0	0	2	0	6	2	0	0	24	3
