= Omar Al Ali =

Emirati football referee (born 1988)

- Born: 16 February 1988 (age 38); Sharjah, United Arab Emirates

Domestic
Years	League	Role
2014–present	UAE Pro League	Referee

International
Years	League	Role
2015–present	FIFA listed	Referee

Omar Al Ali (Arabic: عمر العلي; born 16 February 1988) is an Emirati football referee. He has been affiliated with FIFA and the Asian Football Confederation since 2015. He has also officiated matches in the UAE Pro League since 2014.

== Career ==
On 11 May 2014, Al Ali officiated his first match in the UAE Pro League. During the match between Al Dhafra and Al Ahli (1–5), he issued five yellow cards and one red card.

On 19 January 2015, he officiated his first international match, when Sweden lost 0–1 to the Finland in a friendly match through a goal scored by Roope Riski. During the match, Al Ali issued two yellow cards, one to Sweden's Ludwig Augustinsson and the other to Finland's Joni Mårtensson.

Al Ali was selected as a referee for the postponed 2023 AFC Asian Cup. During the tournament, he officiated one group-stage match. He was also included on the list of referees for the 2026 FIFA World Cup.
