= 2024 Yokohama F. Marinos season =

Yokohama F. Marinos
2024 season
- Chairman: Akihiro Nakayama
- Manager: Harry Kewell (until 16 July 2024); John Hutchinson (interim)
- Stadium: Nissan Stadium
- J1 League: 9th
- Emperor's Cup: Semi-final
- J.League Cup: Semi-final
- 2023–24 AFC Champions League: Runners-up
- 2024–25 AFC Champions League Elite: League stage
- Top goalscorer: League: Anderson Lopes (21); All: Anderson Lopes (33)
- Average home league attendance: 24,843
Home colours	Away colours
- All statistics correct as of 23:06, 20 November 2023 (UTC).

The 2024 Yokohama F. Marinos season was the club's 52nd season in existence and the 42nd consecutive season in the top flight of Japanese football. In addition to the domestic league, in which they were the defending champions, Yokohama F. Marinos participated in this season's editions of the Emperor's Cup, the J.League Cup and the AFC Champions League Elite.

== Players ==
No.	Name	Nationality	Date of birth (age)	Previous club	Contract since	Contract end
Goalkeepers
1	William Popp	(Japan) (United States)	21 October 1994 (age 31)	(Japan) FC Machida Zelvia	2024	2024
21	Hiroki Iikura	(Japan)	1 June 1986 (age 39)	(Japan) Vissel Kobe	2023	2024
31	Fuma Shirasaka	(Japan)	5 December 1996 (age 29)	(Japan) Kagoshima United	2021	2024
41	Riku Terakado	(Japan)	23 November 2002 (age 23)	(Japan) Renofa Yamaguchi	2021	2024
Defenders
2	Katsuya Nagato	(Japan)	15 January 1995 (age 31)	(Japan) Kashima Antlers	2022	
4	Shinnosuke Hatanaka	(Japan)	25 August 1995 (age 30)	(Japan) Tokyo Verdy	2018	
5	Eduardo	(Brazil)	27 April 1993 (age 33)	(Japan) Sagan Tosu	2022	
13	Ryuta Koike	(Japan)	29 August 1995 (age 30)	(Belgium) Lokeren	2020	
15	Takumi Kamijima	(Japan)	5 February 1997 (age 29)	(Japan) Kashiwa Reysol	2023	
16	Ren Kato	(Japan)	28 December 1999 (age 26)	(Japan) Tokyo Verdy	2024	
24	Hijiri Kato	(Japan)	16 September 2001 (age 24)	(Japan) V-Varen Nagasaki	2023	
26	Yuta Koike	(Japan)	6 November 1996 (age 29)	(Japan) Cerezo Osaka	2022	
27	Ken Matsubara	(Japan)	6 February 1993 (age 33)	(Japan) Albirex Niigata	2017	
39	Taiki Watanabe	(Japan)	22 April 1999 (age 27)	(Japan) Albirex Niigata	2024	
47	Kazuya Yamamura	(Japan)	2 December 1989 (age 36)	(Japan) Kawasaki Frontale	2024	
49	Justin Homma	(Japan) (United States)	26 August 2005 (age 20)	(Japan) Vissel Kobe	2024	2024
Midfielders
8	Takuya Kida	(Japan)	23 August 1994 (age 31)	Youth Team	2012	
17	Kenta Inoue	(Japan)	23 July 1998 (age 27)	(Japan) Oita Trinita	2023	
18	Kota Mizunuma	(Japan)	22 February 1990 (age 36)	(Japan) Cerezo Osaka	2020	
20	Jun Amano	(Japan)	19 July 1991 (age 34)	(South Korea) Jeonbuk Hyundai Motors	2014	
28	Riku Yamane	(Japan)	24 August 2003 (age 22)	Youth Team	2022	
35	Keigo Sakakibara	(Japan)	9 October 2000 (age 25)	(Japan) ReinMeer Aomori	2023	
45	Jean Claude	(Togo)	14 December 2003 (age 22)	(Saudi Arabia) Al Nassr FC	2024	2026
46	Hiroto Asada	(Japan)	16 January 2008 (age 18)	Youth Team	2023	
Strikers
7	Élber	(Brazil)	27 May 1992 (age 33)	(Brazil) Bahia	2021	
9	Takuma Nishimura	(Japan)	22 October 1996 (age 29)	(Switzerland) Servette FC	2022	
10	Anderson Lopes	(Brazil)	15 September 1993 (age 32)	(China) Wuhan	2023	
11	Yan Matheus	(Brazil)	4 September 1998 (age 27)	(Brazil) Palmeiras	2022	
14	Asahi Uenaka	(Japan)	1 November 2001 (age 24)	(Japan) V-Varen Nagasaki	2023	
23	Ryo Miyaichi	(Japan)	14 December 1992 (age 33)	(Germany) FC St. Pauli	2021	
42	Kohei Mochizuki	(Japan)	7 June 2006 (age 19)	Youth Team	2023	
Players who are on loan to other club
	Kaina Yoshio	(Japan)	28 June 1998 (age 27)	(Japan) FC Machida Zelvia		
34	Takuto Kimura	(Japan)	3 July 1991 (age 34)	(Japan) Ehime FC	2023	2024
43	Eitaro Matsuda	(Japan)	20 May 2001 (age 24)	(Japan) Albirex Niigata	2021	2025
48	Keita Ueda	(Japan)	3 September 2002 (age 23)	(Japan) Tochigi	2021	2024
Players who left during mid-season
37	Kento Shiogai	(Japan)	26 March 2005 (age 21)	(Japan) Keio University	2024	2024
14	Nam Tae-hee	(South Korea)	3 July 1991 (age 34)	(Qatar) Al-Duhail	2023	2024

== Transfers ==
=== Pre-season ===
==== In ====
Transfers in

Position	Player	Transferred from	Fee
GK	(Japan) (United States) William Popp	(Japan) FC Machida Zelvia	Free
DF	(Japan) Kazuya Yamamura	(Japan) Kawasaki Frontale	Free
DF	(Japan) Taiki Watanabe	(Japan) Albirex Niigata	Free
DF	(Japan) Ren Kato	(Japan) Tokyo Verdy	Free
DF	(Japan) Manato Yoshida	(Japan) N.I.F.S. Kanoya	Free
FW	(Japan) Kento Shiogai	(Japan) Keio University	Free

Loan in

Position	Player	Transferred from	Fee
DF	(Japan) (United States) Justin Homma	(Japan) Vissel Kobe	Season loan

Loan return

Position	Player	Transferred from	Fee
GK	(Japan) Riku Terakado	(Japan) Renofa Yamaguchi	End of loan
MF	(Japan) Shunsuke Hirai	(Japan) Reilac Shiga	Free (Note: Shunsuke Hirai left the club to join Reilac Shiga permanently as his contract expired.)
MF	(Japan) Takuto Minami	(Japan) Iwate Morioka	End of loan (Note: Takuto Minami left the club to join Reilac Shiga permanently.)
MF	(Japan) Jun Amano	(South Korea) Jeonbuk Hyundai Motors	End of loan

==== Out ====
Transfers out

Position	Player	Transferred to	Fee
GK	(Japan) Jun Ichimori	(Japan) Gamba Osaka	End of loan
GK	(Japan) (Nigeria) Powell Obinna Obi	(Japan) Vissel Kobe	Free
DF	(Japan) Ryotaro Tsunoda	(England) Cardiff City	Free
MF	(Japan) Shunsuke Hirai	(Japan) Reilac Shiga	Free
MF	(Japan) Takuto Minami	(Japan) Reilac Shiga	Free
FW	(Japan) Takumi Tsukui	(Japan) Azul Claro Numazu	Free
FW	(Japan) Kenyu Sugimoto	(Japan) Júbilo Iwata	End of loan
FW	(Japan) Kento Shiogai	(Netherlands) NEC	Undisclosed

Loan out

Position	Player	Transferred from	Fee
DF	(Japan) Eitaro Matsuda	(Japan) Albirex Niigata	Season loan
MF	(Japan) Takuto Kimura	(Japan) Ventforet Kofu	Season loan
FW	(Japan) Takuma Nishimura	(Switzerland) Servette FC	Season loan

=== Mid-season ===
==== In ====
Transfers in

Position	Player	Transferred from	Fee
MF	(Togo) Jean Claude	(Saudi Arabia) Al Nassr FC	Undisclosed

Loan in

Position	Player	Transferred from	Fee

Loan return

Position	Player	Transferred from	Fee
FW	(Japan) Takuma Nishimura	(Switzerland) Servette FC	End of loan

==== Out ====
Transfers out

Position	Player	Transferred to	Fee
FW	(South Korea) Nam Tae-hee	(South Korea) Jeju United	Free

Loan out

Position	Player	Transferred to	Fee
DF	(Japan) Manato Yoshida	(Japan) Oita Trinita	Season loan
DF	(Japan) Yuki Saneto	(Japan) Vegalta Sendai	Season loan
MF	(Japan) Keita Ueda	(Japan) SC Sagamihara	Season loan
FW	(Japan) Kaina Yoshio	(South Korea) Jeju United	Season loan

== Competitions ==
=== J1 League ===
Pos	Team	Pld	W	D	L	GF	GA	GD	Pts
7	FC Tokyo	38	15	9	14	53	51	+2	54
8	Kawasaki Frontale	38	13	13	12	66	57	+9	52
9	Yokohama F. Marinos	38	15	7	16	61	62	−1	52
10	Cerezo Osaka	38	13	13	12	43	48	−5	52
11	Nagoya Grampus	38	15	5	18	44	47	−3	50

Source: JLeague.co, JLeague.jp, J.League Data Site
Rules for classification: 1) Points; 2) Goal difference; 3) Goals scored; 4) Head-to-head points; 5) Head-to-head goal difference; 6) Head-to-head goals scored; 7) Fewer disciplinary points.

==== Matches ====
The full league fixtures were released on 23 January 2024.

25 February 1	Tokyo Verdy	1–2	Yokohama F. Marinos	Chōfu
14:00 JST	Fuki Yamada 7'; Goki Yamada (yellow card) 76'	Report	Anderson Lopes 89'; Ken Matsubara 90+3'; William Popp (yellow card) 3'; Takumi Kamijima (yellow card) 86'	Stadium: Ajinomoto Stadium; Attendance: 53,026; Referee: Hiroyuki Kimura

1 Mar 2	Yokohama F. Marinos	0–1	Avispa Fukuoka	Yokohama
18:33 JST	Eduardo (yellow card) 45+1'	Report	Kazuya Konno 52'	Stadium: Nissan Stadium; Attendance: 19,487; Referee: Ryo Tanimoto

10 April 3 (Rescheduled)	Yokohama F. Marinos	2–0	Gamba Osaka	Yokohama
18:33 JST	Anderson Lopes 53'; Asahi Uenaka 90+9' (yellow card) 90'; Katsuya Nagato (yellow card) 61'	Report	Ryotaro Meshino (yellow card) 61'	Stadium: Nissan Stadium; Attendance: 15,528; Referee: Jumpei Iida

17 March 4	Kyoto Sanga	2–3	Yokohama F. Marinos	Kyoto
14:00 JST	Kyo Sota 45'; Sota Kawasaki 45+3'; Hisashi Appiah Tawiah (red card) 8'; Shimpei Fukuoka (yellow card) 89'	Report	Kota Mizunuma 5'; Anderson Lopes 33', 52' (yellow card) 73'; van Wermeskerken (yellow card) 31'; William Popp (red card) 64'	Stadium: Sanga Stadium by Kyocera; Attendance: 12,937; Referee: Shu Kawamata

30 March 5	Nagoya Grampus	2–1	Yokohama F. Marinos	Toyota
16:03 JST	Tsukasa Morishima 77' (yellow card) 33'; Yamanaka 90+2'	Report	Nagato 54'; Anderson (yellow card) 25'; Uenaka (yellow card) 62'; Kamijima (yellow card) 83'	Stadium: Toyota Stadium; Attendance: 31,844; Referee: Hayato Shimizu

3 April 6	Yokohama F. Marinos	0–0	Kawasaki Frontale	Yokohama
18:33 JST	Kota Takai (yellow card) 22'; Kento Tachibanada (yellow card) 45+5'; Akihiro Ienaga (yellow card) 56'; Asahi Sasaki (yellow card) 61'; Marcinho (red card) 73'	Report		Stadium: Nissan Stadium; Attendance: 26,031; Referee: Hiroyuki Kimura

7 April 7	Vissel Kobe	1–2	Yokohama F. Marinos	Kobe
14:03 JST	Miyashiro 66'; Matheus Thuler (yellow card) 59'; Maekawa (red card)	Report	Anderson Lopes 47' (yellow card) 90+6'; Yan Matheus 83'; Ren Kato (yellow card) 14'; Taiki Watanabe (yellow card) 19'	Stadium: Noevir Stadium Kobe; Attendance: 23,456; Referee: Akihiko Ikeuchi

13 April 8	Yokohama F. Marinos	2–2	Shonan Bellmare	Yokohama
18:33 JST	Kento Shiogai 21'; Nam Tae-hee 48'; Taiki Watanabe (yellow card) 15'; Riku Yamane (yellow card) 78'	Report	Taiyo Hiraoka 41'; Sho Fukuda 80'; Masaki Ikeda (yellow card) 27'; Kazuki Oiwa (red card) 76'	Stadium: Nissan Stadium; Attendance: 23,437; Referee: Atsushi Kamimura

29 May 9 (Rescheduled)	Yokohama F. Marinos	4–0	Kashiwa Reysol	Yokohama
18:33 JST	Kento Shiogai 21'; Anderson Lopes 11', 65', 90+6'; Eduardo (yellow card) 32'; Ren Kato (yellow card) 51'	Report	Taiyo Koga (yellow card) 9'; Diego (yellow card) 38'; Kazuki Kumasawa (yellow card) 80'; Takumi Tsuchiya (yellow card) 87'	Stadium: Nissan Stadium; Attendance: 23,437; Referee: Atsushi Kamimura

27 April 10	Cerezo Osaka	2–2	Yokohama F. Marinos	Osaka
15:03 UTC+9	Léo Ceará 45+8', 68'	Report	Kota Mizunuma 17'; Keigo Sakakibara 60'; William Popp (yellow card) 45'; Hijiri Kato (yellow card) 65'; Yan 75'; Taiki Watanabe (yellow card) 79'	Stadium: Yodoko Sakura Stadium; Attendance: 23,437; Referee: Atsushi Kamimura

3 May 11	Yokohama F. Marinos	1–1	Júbilo Iwata	Yokohama
18:33 JST	Anderson Lopes 64' (yellow card) 28'; Elber (yellow card) 53'; Eduardo (yellow card) 90+6'	Report	Matheus Peixoto 85'; Naoki Kanuma (yellow card) 76'	Stadium: Nissan Stadium; Attendance: 38,945; Referee: Koei Koya

6 May 12	Urawa Red Diamonds	2–1	Yokohama F. Marinos	Saitama
15:03 JST	Atsuki Ito 42', 66'; Hirokazu Ishihara (yellow card) 33'; Alexander Scholz (yellow card) 37'; Bryan Linssen (yellow card) 87'	Report	Hijiri Kato 86'	Stadium: Saitama Stadium 2002; Attendance: 40,579; Referee: Futoshi Nakamura

19 June 13 (Rescheduled)	Yokohama F. Marinos	3–2	Sanfrecce Hiroshima	Yokohama
18:33 JST	Yan Matheus 27', 90'; Anderson Lopes 87'	Report	Mutsuki Kato 2'; Yuki Ohashi 78'; Makoto Mitsuta (yellow card) 21' (yellow-red card) 52'	Stadium: Nissan Stadium; Attendance: 11,110; Referee: Akihiko Ikeuchi

15 May 14	Albirex Niigata	3–1	Yokohama F. Marinos	Niigata
19:03 UTC+9	Koji Suzuki 51'; Kaito Taniguchi 53'; Jin Okumura 82'	Report	Kota Watanabe 25'; Ken Matsubara (yellow card) 63'	Stadium: Denka Big Swan Stadium; Attendance: 15,065; Referee: Koichiro Fukushima

19 May 15	FC Tokyo	1–1	Yokohama F. Marinos	Chofu
15:00 JST	Bangnagande (yellow card) 18'; Nagatomo (yellow card) 49' (goal) 55'; Henrique Trevisan (yellow card) 90+3'	Report	Kida (yellow card) 13'; Nam Tae-hee 25'; Élber (yellow card) 59'; Uenaka (yellow card) 89'	Stadium: Ajinomoto Stadium; Attendance: 30,411; Referee: Sascha Stegemann (Germany)

3 July 16 (Rescheduled)	Yokohama F. Marinos	0–1	Sagan Tosu	Yokohama
19:00 UTC+9		Report	Yokoyama 53'; Taichi Kikuchi (yellow card) 71'	Stadium: NHK Spring Mitsuzawa Football Stadium; Attendance: 8,504; Referee: Yuichi Nishimura

1 June 17	Kashima Antlers	3–2	Yokohama F. Marinos	Tokyo
15:03 JST	Suzuki 57'; Nono 74'; Sekigawa 84'; Hayato Nakama (yellow card) 17'; Shu Morooka (yellow card) 45+3'	Report	Anderson Lopes 10' (yellow card) 71'; Uenaka 90+4'; Takuya Kida (yellow card) 56'; Eduardo (yellow card) 72'; Harry Kewell (yellow card)	Stadium: Japan National Stadium; Attendance: 52,860; Referee: Hiroyuki Kimura

15 June 18	Yokohama F. Marinos	1–3	Machida Zelvia	Yokohama
16:03 UTC+9	Miyaichi 14'	Report	Shoji 43'; Fujio 57'; Shimoda 61'; Erik Nascimento Lima (yellow card) 38'	Stadium: Nissan Stadium; Attendance: 37,396; Referee: Ryo Tanimoto

23 June 19	Hokkaido Consadole Sapporo	0–1	Yokohama F. Marinos	Kawasaki
15:03 JST	Yuki Kobayashi (yellow card) 73'	Report	Anderson Lopes 63'; Hijiri Kato (yellow card) 81'	Stadium: Kawasaki Todoroki Stadium; Attendance: 26,677; Referee: Atsushi Kamimura

26 June 20	Avispa Fukuoka	2–1	Yokohama F. Marinos	Fukuoka
15:03 JST	Shahab Zahedi 20'; Wellington 70'; Itsuki Oda (yellow card) 29'	Report	Jun Amano 83'; Takumi Kamijima (yellow card) 34'; Ryo Miyachi (yellow card) 74'	Stadium: Best Denki Stadium; Attendance: 6,953; Referee: Koei Koya

29 June 21	Yokohama F. Marinos	1–2	Tokyo Verdy	Yokohama
16:03 UTC+9	Miyaichi 45+5'; Ken Matsubara (yellow card) 45'; Takuya Kida (yellow card) 65'	Report	Hiroto Yamami 12'; Takumi Kamijima 22' (o.g.)	Stadium: Nissan Stadium; Attendance: 26,134; Referee: Futoshi Nakamura

6 July 22	Gamba Osaka	4–0	Yokohama F. Marinos	Yokohama
14:03 JST	Juan Alano 4' (yellow card) 50'; Dawhan 45+3'; Takashi Usami 70'; Issam Jebali 88'	Report	Yan (yellow card) 65'	Stadium: Nissan Stadium; Attendance: 37,396; Referee: Ryo Tanimoto

14 July 23	Yokohama F. Marinos	4–1	Kashima Antlers	Yokohama
19:33 JST	Amano 45+3'; Eduardo 52'; Élber 71'; Uenaka 90+6'; Eduardo (yellow card) 42'; Takuma Nishimura (yellow card) 59'; Yan Matheus (yellow card) 73'	Report	Chinen 29'	Stadium: Nissan Stadium; Attendance: 31,463; Referee: Shu Kawamata

20 July 24	Machida Zelvia	1–2	Yokohama F. Marinos	Tokyo
18:03 UTC+9	Duke 85'; Erik Nascimento Lima (yellow card) 19'; Gen Shoji (yellow card) 58'	Report	Anderson Lopes 33' (pen.); Amano 43' (yellow card) 38'; Takuma Nishimura (yellow card) 85'; Hijiri Kato (yellow card) 90+5'	Stadium: Japan National Stadium; Attendance: 46,401; Referee: Takafumi Mikuriya

7 August 25	Yokohama F. Marinos	3–2	Hokkaido Consadole Sapporo	Yokohama
18:33 JST	Elber 4'; Yan 31'; Anderson Lopes 51'; Takuya Kida (yellow card) 20'; Takuma Nishimura (yellow card) 46'	Report	Yuya Osano 13'; Daiki Suga 58'; Leo Osaki (yellow card) 23'	Stadium: Nissan Stadium; Attendance: 18,574; Referee: Koji Takasaki

11 August 26	Yokohama F. Marinos	1–2	Vissel Kobe	Yokohama
18:33 JST	Eduardo 42'; Takuya Kida (yellow card) 20'	Report	Muto 45', 65'; Takahiro Ogihara (yellow card) 34'	Stadium: Nissan Stadium; Attendance: 30,419; Referee: Hiroyuki Kimura

17 August 27	Kawasaki Frontale	1–3	Yokohama F. Marinos	Kawasaki
15:03 JST	Erison 89'; Kota Takai (yellow card) 63'	Report	Anderson Lopes 58'; Takuma Nishimura 60'; Shinnosuke Hatanaka 78'; Elber (yellow card) 90+2'	Stadium: Kawasaki Todoroki Stadium; Attendance: 22,850; Referee: Koichiro Fukushima

24 August 28	Yokohama F. Marinos	4–0	Cerezo Osaka	Yokohama
18:33 JST	Anderson Lopes 49', 83'; Reo Kato 73'; Jun Amano 90+5'; Ken Matsubara (yellow card) 63'	Report	Shinji Kagawa (yellow card) 77'	Stadium: Nissan Stadium; Attendance: 47,926; Referee: Yudai Yamamoto

16 November 29 (Rescheduled)	Júbilo Iwata	3–4	Yokohama F. Marinos	Iwata
15:03 JST	Jordy Croux 4'; Ryo Germain 83', 90+3'; Léo Gomes (yellow card) 59'		Anderson Lopes 45+4', 64', 71'; Takuma Nishimura 47' (yellow card) 45+2'	Stadium: Yamaha Stadium

13 September 30	Yokohama F. Marinos	1–2	Kyoto Sanga	Yokohama
18:33 JST	Yoshinori Suzuki 38' (o.g.); Takuma Nishimura (red card) 9'; Elber (yellow card) 27'; Anderson Lopes (yellow card) 34'	Report	Rafael Elias 23' (yellow card) 86'; Taichi Hara 53'; Marco Túlio (yellow card) 32'	Stadium: Nissan Stadium; Attendance: 10,679; Referee: Yuichi Nishimura

22 September 31	Sanfrecce Hiroshima	6–2	Yokohama F. Marinos	Kawasaki
18:33 JST	Mutsuki Kato 3'; Tolgay Arslan 22', 40'; Naoto Arai 48'; Shunki Higashi 83'; Pieros Sotiriou 90+3'	Report	Kenta Inoue 19'; Anderson Lopes 45+1'	Stadium: Uvance Todoroki Stadium by Fujitsu; Attendance: 25,814; Referee: César Arturo Ramos

28 September 32	Yokohama F. Marinos	1–3	FC Tokyo	Yokohama
17:00 JST	Anderson Lopes 5'	Report	Oka 19'; Tawaratsumida 60'; Nakagawa 89'; Ryotaro Araki (yellow card) 24'	Stadium: Nissan Stadium; Attendance: 28,601; Referee: Shu Kawamata

5 October 33	Kashiwa Reysol	1–0	Yokohama F. Marinos	Kashiwa
15:03 JST	Matheus Sávio 9'		Anderson Lopes (yellow card) 9'; Ren Kato (yellow card) 57'	Stadium: Sankyo Frontier Kashiwa Stadium; Attendance: 12,914; Referee: Jumpei Iida

18 October 34	Yokohama F. Marinos	0–0	Albirex Niigata	Yokohama
17:00 JST	Riku Yamane (yellow card) 64'	Report	Motoki Hasegawa (yellow card) 59'; Jin Okumura (yellow card) 84'	Stadium: Nissan Stadium; Attendance: 18,781; Referee: Ryo Tanimoto

30 October 35	Yokohama F. Marinos	0–0	Urawa Red Diamonds	Yokohama
17:00 JST		Report		Stadium: Nissan Stadium; Attendance: 21,397; Referee: Akihiko Ikeuchi

9 November 36	Sagan Tosu	1–2	Yokohama F. Marinos	Tosu
13:00 UTC+9	Wataru Harada 33' (yellow card) 33'; Kento Nishiya (yellow card) 20'	Report	Takuma Nishimura 45+3'; Anderson 80'; Taichi Kikuchi (yellow card) 17'	Stadium: Ekimae Real Estate Stadium; Attendance: 9,479; Referee: Jumpei Iida

30 November 37	Shonan Bellmare	2–3	Yokohama F. Marinos	Hiratsuka
15:03 JST	Akito Suzuki 27'; Sho Fukuda 67'; Kim Min-tae (yellow card) 49'	Report	Anderson 53'; Jun Amano 89'; Yan Matheus 90+3'	Stadium: Lemon Gas Stadium Hiratsuka; Attendance: 13,192; Referee: Yuichi Nishimura

8 December 38	Yokohama F. Marinos	0–2	Nagoya Grampus	Yokohama
17:00 JST	Takuma Nishimura (yellow card) 49'	Report	Ryuji Izumi 24'; Yuya Yamagishi 70'	Stadium: Nissan Stadium; Attendance: 42,866; Referee: Ryo Tanimoto

=== J.League Cup ===
The 2024 J.League Cup was expanded so that all 60 J.League clubs would participate.

9 October 2024 Semi-final first leg	Yokohama F. Marinos	1–3	Nagoya Grampus	Yokohama
19:03 JST (UTC+9)	Anderson Lopes 31' (yellow card) 71'; Watanabe (yellow card) 36'	Report	Shiihashi 3'; Mikuni 15'; Nagai (yellow card) 58'; Yamagishi 76'	Stadium: Nissan Stadium; Attendance: 10,529; Referee: Futoshi Nakamura

13 October 2024 Semi-final second leg	Nagoya Grampus	1–2 (4–3 agg.)	Yokohama F. Marinos	Toyota
15:03 JST (UTC+9)	Nakayama (yellow card) 29'; Yamagishi 46'; Nogami (yellow card) 58'	Report	Nishimura 33'; Uenaka 82' (yellow card) 90+3'; Inoue (yellow card) 88'; Yan (yellow card) 90+6'	Stadium: Toyota Stadium; Attendance: 29,081; Referee: Yuichi Nishimura

=== Emperor's Cup ===
12 June Second round	Yokohama F. Marinos	2–2 (a.e.t.) (5–4 p)	FC Gifu	Gifu
19:00	Uenaka 81' (yellow card) 90+4'; Inoue 90+6'	Report	Arakaki 83'; Taguchi 89'; Yuki Wada (yellow card) 107'	Stadium: Gifu Nagaragawa Meadow; Attendance: 3,515; Referee: Shu Kawamata
	Penalties
	Uenaka (penalty scored); Yamane (penalty scored); Murakami (penalty scored); Koike (penalty scored); Eduardo (penalty scored)		(penalty scored) Yamauchi; (penalty scored) Taguchi; (penalty scored) Kita; (penalty scored) Arakaki; (penalty missed) Kai

10 July Third round	Yokohama F. Marinos	2–2 (a.e.t.) (5–4 p)	Mito HollyHock	Mito
19:00	Inoue 35'; Uenaka 84'	Report	Nose 10'; Kusano 14'	Stadium: K's denki Stadium Mito; Attendance: 2,739; Referee: Ryo Tanimoto
	Penalties
	Uenaka (penalty scored); Koike (penalty scored); Watanabe (penalty scored); Amano (penalty scored); Eduardo (penalty scored)		(penalty missed) Kubo; (penalty scored) Arai; (penalty scored) Ikari; (penalty scored) Nagai; (penalty scored) Saito

21 August Round of 16	V-Varen Nagasaki	2–3	Yokohama F. Marinos	Isahaya
19:03	Juanma 58'; Matheus Jesus 90+2'	Report	Amano 67'; Nishimura 90+8'; Uenaka 90+10'	Stadium: Transcosmos Stadium Nagasaki; Attendance: 5,135; Referee: Akihiko Ikeuchi

25 September Quarter-final	Yokohama F. Marinos	5–1	Renofa Yamaguchi	Yokohama
18:30	Yamane 16'; Élber 51'; Yan Matheus 71'; Mizunuma 77'; Anderson Lopes 86'	Report	Okuyama 23'	Stadium: Nissan Stadium; Attendance: 6,201; Referee: Koei Koya

27 October Semi-final	Yokohama F.Marinos	2–3 (a.e.t.)	Gamba Osaka	Suita
13:05	Yan Matheus 37'; Matsubara 88'	Report	Yamada 26'; Nakatani 90+3'; Sakamoto 120+5'	Stadium: Panasonic Stadium Suita; Attendance: 20,311; Referee: Hiroyuki Kimura

=== 2023–24 AFC Champions League ===
==== Knockout stage ====
14 February 2024 Round of 16 first leg	Bangkok United (Thailand)	2–2	(Japan) Yokohama F. Marinos	Pathum Thani, Thailand
19.00 UTC+7	Nitipong 35'; Mahmoud 90+2'; Vander (yellow card) 90+7'	Report	Élber 18'; Watanabe 24'; Kida (yellow card) 45'; Eduardo (yellow card) 60'; Matsubara (red card) 90+6'	Stadium: Thammasat Stadium; Attendance: 8,387; Referee: Mohammed Khled Al Hoish (Saudi Arabia)

21 February 2024 Round of 16 second leg	Yokohama F. Marinos (Japan)	1–0 (a.e.t.) (3–2 agg.)	(Thailand) Bangkok United	Yokohama, Japan
20.00 UTC+9	Anderson Lopes 120+2' (pen.), (yellow card) 120+3'	Report	Patiwat (yellow card) 76'; Vander (yellow card) 90+3'; Everton (yellow card) 108'	Stadium: Yokohama International Stadium; Attendance: 8,343; Referee: Ilgiz Tanyashev (Uzbekistan)

6 March 2024 Quarter-final first leg	Shandong Taishan (China)	1–2	(Japan) Yokohama F. Marinos	Jinan, China
20:00 UTC+8	Chen Pu 90+1'; Peng Xinli (yellow card) 51'; Jadson (yellow card) 57'; Li Yuanyi (yellow card) 64'; Gao Zhunyi (yellow card) 64'	Report	Anderson Lopes 7'; Yan Matheus 69'; Kota Watanabe (yellow card) 52'	Stadium: Jinan Olympic Sports Center Stadium; Attendance: 47,667; Referee: Adham Makhadmeh (Jordan)

13 March 2024 Quarter-final second leg	Yokohama F. Marinos (Japan)	1–0 (3–1 agg.)	(China) Shandong Taishan	Yokohama, Japan
20:00 UTC+8	Anderson Lopes 75'; Takuya Kida (yellow card) 30'; Katsuya Nagato (yellow card) 44' (yellow-red card) 47'	Report	Fei Nanduo (yellow card) 23'; Liu Yang (yellow card) 38'; Bi Jinhao (yellow card) 71'; Gao Zhunyi (red card) 83'	Stadium: Yokohama International Stadium; Attendance: 12,887; Referee: Nazmi Nasaruddin (Malaysia)

17 April 2024 Semi-final first leg	Ulsan HD (South Korea)	1–0	(Japan) Yokohama F. Marinos	Ulsan, South Korea
19:00 UTC+9	Lee Dong-gyeong 19'; Joo Min-Kyu (yellow card) 34'	Report	Jun Amano (yellow card) 85'; Ken Matsubara (yellow card) 88'	Stadium: Ulsan Munsu Football Stadium; Attendance: 9,558; Referee: Ahmed Al-Kaf (Oman)

24 April 2024 Semi-final second leg	Yokohama F. Marinos (Japan)	3–2 (a.e.t.) (3–3 agg.) (5–4 p)	(South Korea) Ulsan HD	Yokohama, Japan
19:00 UTC+9	Uenaka 13', 30'; Anderson Lopes 21'; Takumi Kamijima (red card) 39'	Report	Matheus Sales 35'; Bojanić 42' (pen.)	Stadium: Nissan Stadium; Attendance: 16,098; Referee: Alireza Faghani (Australia)
	Penalties
	Anderson Lopes (penalty scored); Mizunuma (penalty scored); Matsubara (penalty scored); Amano (penalty scored); Eduardo (penalty scored)		(penalty scored) Ádám; (penalty scored) Kelvin; (penalty scored) Ko Seung-beom; (penalty scored) Lee Chung-yong; (penalty missed) Kim Min-woo

11 May 2024 Final first leg	Yokohama F. Marinos (Japan)	2–1	(United Arab Emirates) Al Ain	Yokohama, Japan
19:00 UTC+9	Uenaka 72' (yellow card) 73'; Watanabe 84'; Katsuya Nagato (yellow card) 90+3'	Report	Abbas 12'; Park Yong-Woo (yellow card) 90+5'	Stadium: Yokohama International Stadium; Attendance: 53,704; Referee: Salman Falahi (Qatar)

25 May 2024 Final second leg	Al Ain (United Arab Emirates)	5–1 (6–3 agg.)	(Japan) Yokohama F. Marinos	Al Ain, UAE
20:00 UTC+4	Rahimi 8', 67' (yellow card) 69'; Kaku 33' (pen.) (yellow card) 90+9'; Laba 90+1', 90+5'	Report	Yan Matheus 40'; William Popp (red card) 45+10'	Stadium: Hazza bin Zayed Stadium; Attendance: 24,826; Referee: Ilgiz Tantashev (Uzbekistan)

=== 2024–25 AFC Champions League Elite ===
Pos	Team	Pld	W	D	L	GF	GA	GD	Pts	Qualification
1	(Japan) Yokohama F. Marinos	7	6	0	1	21	7	+14	18	Advance to round of 16
2	(Japan) Kawasaki Frontale	7	5	0	2	13	4	+9	15	Advance to round of 16
3	(Malaysia) Johor Darul Ta'zim	7	4	2	1	16	8	+8	14	Advance to round of 16
4	(South Korea) Gwangju	7	4	2	1	15	9	+6	14	Advance to round of 16
5	(Japan) Vissel Kobe	7	4	1	2	14	9	+5	13	Advance to round of 16

Source: Asian Football Confederation
Rules for classification: 1) points; 2) goal difference; 3) number of goals scored; 4) number of matches won; 5) penalty shoot-out if only two teams remain tied and played each other on the final matchday 6) fair play ranking; 7) drawing of lots

Win Draw Loss

==== League stage ====
17 September 2024 Matchday 1	Gwangju (South Korea)	7–3	(Japan) Yokohama F. Marinos	Gwangju, South Korea
19:00 UTC+9	Asani 2', 55', 90+2' (yellow card) 64'; Oh Hu-seong 15' (yellow card) 58'; Mikeltadze 69'; Lee Heui-kyun 72' (yellow card) 72'; Gabriel 75'; Kim Gyeong-Jae (yellow card) 44'; Byeon Jun-Soo (yellow card) 64'; Jeong Ho-Yeon (yellow card) 90+6'	Report	Élber 34', 59'; Takuma Nishimura 85'; Eduardo (red card) 78'	Stadium: Gwangju World Cup Stadium; Attendance: 7,126; Referee: Alireza Faghani (Iran)

2 October 2024 Matchday 2	Yokohama F. Marinos (Japan)	4–0	(South Korea) Ulsan HD	Yokohama, Japan
19:00 UTC+9	Watanabe 4' (pen.); Nishimura 44'; Lopes 83'; Mizunuma 90+2'; Ken Matsubara (yellow card) 16'; Takumi Kamijima (yellow card) 51'	Report	Hwang Seok-Ho (yellow card) 15'; Kim Min-Woo (yellow card) 22'	Stadium: International Stadium Yokohama; Attendance: 8,153; Referee: Mohammed Al Hoaish (Saudi Arabia)

22 October 2024 Matchday 3	Shandong Taishan (China)	Voided (2–2)	(Japan) Yokohama F. Marinos	Jinan, China
20:00 UTC+8	Cryzan 43' (yellow card) 13'; Zheng Zheng 90+2'; Liu Yang (yellow card) 37'	Report	Lopes 54'; Matheus 87'; Ryuta Koike (yellow card) 23'; Jun Amano (yellow card) 83'	Stadium: Jinan Olympic Sports Center Stadium; Attendance: 24,796; Referee: Omar Mohamed Al-Ali (United Arab Emirates)

6 November 2024 Matchday 4	Yokohama F. Marinos (Japan)	5–0	(Thailand) Buriram United	Yokohama, Japan
19:00 UTC+9	Kenta Inoue 11'; Anderson Lopes 45+1' (pen.), 57'; Neil Etheridge 45+3' (o.g.); Asahi Uenaka 66'	Report	Sasalak Haiprakhon (red card) 27'; Dion Cools (yellow card) 68'	Stadium: International Stadium Yokohama; Attendance: 8,144; Referee: Ali Saeed Al Naqbi (United Arab Emirates)

27 November 2024 Matchday 5	Yokohama F. Marinos (Japan)	2–0	(South Korea) Pohang Steelers	Yokohama, Japan
	Yan Matheus 41'; Anderson Lopes 90+5'; Eduardo (yellow card) 45+4'	Report	Kim Myeong-Jun (penalty missed) 90+9; Kang Hyeon-Je (yellow card) 76'; Lee Dong-Hyeop (yellow card) 90+4'	Stadium: International Stadium Yokohama; Attendance: 8,932; Referee: Abdulrahman Al-Jassim (Qatar)

3 December 2024 Matchday 6	Central Coast Mariners (Australia)	0–4	(Japan) Yokohama F. Marinos	Gosford, Australia
18:30 UTC+11	Christian Theoharous (yellow card) 46'	Report	Inoue 6', 30'; Lopes 36'; Amano 70'; Takumi Kamijima (yellow card) 40'; Katsuya Nagato (yellow card) 55'; Ryuta Koike (yellow card) 75'	Stadium: Central Coast Stadium; Attendance: 1,864; Referee: Rustam Luftullin (Uzbekistan)

== Team statistics ==
=== Appearances and goals ===
As of 8 Dec 2024

No.	Pos.	Player	J1 League		J.League Cup		Emperor's Cup		2023–24 ACL		2024–25 ACL		Total	
No.	Pos.	Player	Apps	Goals	Apps	Goals	Apps	Goals	Apps	Goals	Apps	Goals	Apps	Goals
1	GK	(Japan) (United States) William Popp	25	0	0	0	1	0	8	0	0	0	34	0
2	DF	(Japan) Katsuya Nagato	18	2	2	0	1	0	4+2	0	3	0	30	2
4	DF	(Japan) Shinnosuke Hatanaka	13+1	1	1	0	1	0	4	0	0	0	19	1
5	DF	(Brazil) Eduardo	23+4	2	0	0	1+2	0	5+2	0	4+1	0	42	2
6	MF	(Japan) Kota Watanabe	27+2	1	2	0	1+1	0	5+1	2	2+1	1	42	4
7	FW	(Brazil) Élber	22+4	2	2	0	2	1	7	1	3	2	40	6
8	MF	(Japan) Takuya Kida	25	0	0	0	0+2	0	6	0	0	0	33	0
9	FW	(Japan) Takuma Nishimura	7+13	2	2	1	1+2	1	0	0	3+2	2	30	6
10	FW	(Brazil) Anderson Lopes	34+2	21	3	1	2	1	8	4	5	6	54	33
11	FW	(Brazil) Yan Matheus	26+8	5	2	0	1+1	2	8	2	5	2	51	11
13	DF	(Japan) Ryuta Koike	3+3	0	0+1	0	2	0	0+1	0	3+1	0	14	0
14	FW	(Japan) Asahi Uenaka	10+23	3	0+2	1	4	3	6+1	3	3+3	1	52	11
15	DF	(Japan) Takumi Kamijima	26	0	2	0	4	0	7	0	6	0	45	0
16	DF	(Japan) Ren Kato	14+13	1	0	0	2+3	0	3+1	0	2	0	38	1
17	MF	(Japan) Kenta Inoue	11+14	1	0+2	0	3+2	2	0+1	0	3+3	3	39	6
18	MF	(Japan) Kota Mizunuma	7+10	2	0+1	0	2+2	1	0+4	0	1+4	1	31	5
20	MF	(Japan) Jun Amano	19+15	5	1+1	0	2+2	1	1+4	0	1+4	1	50	7
21	GK	(Japan) Hiroki Iikura	10+1	0	2	0	4	0	0	0	5	0	22	0
23	FW	(Japan) Ryo Miyaichi	7+24	2	0+1	0	0+3	0	1+7	0	0+4	0	47	2
24	DF	(Japan) Hijiri Kato	8+5	1	0	0	3+1	0	0	0	3+1	0	21	1
26	DF	(Japan) Yuta Koike	1	0	0	0	1+2	0	0	0	0	0	4	0
27	DF	(Japan) Ken Matsubara	28	1	2	0	1	1	6	0	3+2	0	42	2
28	MF	(Japan) Riku Yamane	10+17	0	1	0	5	1	0+7	0	6	0	46	1
31	GK	(Japan) Fuma Shirasaka	2+1	0	0	0	0	0	0+1	0	0	0	4	0
35	MF	(Japan) Keigo Sakakibara	4+5	1	0	0	2	0	2+3	0	0+2	0	18	1
38	FW	(Japan) Yuhi Murakami	2+2	0	0	0	1	0	0+2	0	0	0	7	0
39	DF	(Japan) Taiki Watanabe	13+6	1	1	0	1+1	0	3+3	0	2+1	0	31	1
41	GK	(Japan) Riku Terakado	0	0	0	0	0	0	0	0	1	0	1	0
42	FW	(Japan) Kohei Mochizuki	0	0	0	0	0	0	0	0	0+1	0	1	0
43	DF	(Japan) Reno Noguchi	0	0	0	0	0	0	0	0	0	0	0	0
45	MF	(Togo) Jean Claude	1+2	0	0	0	2	0	0	0	1	0	6	0
46	MF	(Japan) Hiroto Asada	0	0	0	0	0	0	0	0	0+1	0	1	0
47	DF	(Japan) Kazuya Yamamura	1+2	0	0	0	2+1	0	0	0	0	0	6	0
49	DF	(Japan) (United States) Justin Homma	0	0	0	0	0	0	0	0	0	0	0	0
Players featured on a match for the team, but left the club mid-season, either permanently or on loan transfer
19	DF	(Japan) Yuki Saneto	1	0	0	0	1	0	0	0	0	0	2	0
25	MF	(Japan) Kaina Yoshio	0	0	0	0	1	0	0	0	0	0	1	0
29	MF	(South Korea) Nam Tae-Hee	8+3	2	0	0	1	0	4+2	0	0	0	18	2
37	MF	(Japan) Kento Shiogai	2+5	1	0	0	0	0	0	0	0	0	7	1
44	DF	(Japan) Manato Yoshida	0+1	0	0	0	0+1	0	0	0	0	0	2	0
48	MF	(Japan) Keita Ueda	0	0	0	0	0+1	0	0	0	0	0	1	0
