= 2026 Yokohama F. Marinos season =

Yokohama F. Marinos
2026 season
- Chairman: Akihiro Nakayama
- Manager: (Japan) Fumitake Miura
- Stadium: Nissan Stadium
- Average home league attendance: 26,177
Home colours	Away colours
- All statistics correct as of 19 April 2025.

The 2026 Yokohama F. Marinos season is the club's 53rd season in existence.

== Players ==
No.	Name	Nationality	Date of birth (age)	Previous club	Contract since	Contract end
Goalkeepers
1	Park Il-gyu	(Japan) (South Korea)	22 December 1989 (age 36)	(Japan) Sagan Tosu	2025	2027
20	Yuya Tsuboi	(Japan)	23 August 1999 (age 27)	(Japan) Omiya Ardija	2026	2027
21	Hiroki Iikura	(Japan)	1 June 1986 (age 40)	(Japan) Vissel Kobe	2023	2024
31	Ryoya Kimura	(Japan)	10 June 2003 (age 23)	(Japan) Nihon University	2025	2027
Defenders
2	Ren Kato	(Japan)	28 December 1999 (age 26)	(Japan) Tokyo Verdy	2024	
13	Taisei Inoue	(Japan)	1 October 2002 (age 24)	(Japan) Sagan Tosu	2026	2027
15	Taiki Watanabe	(Japan)	22 April 1999 (age 27)	(Japan) Albirex Niigata	2024	
17	Jeison Quiñónes	(Colombia)	17 August 1997 (age 29)	(Colombia) Águilas Doradas	2025	
22	Ryotaro Tsunoda	(Japan)	27 June 1999 (age 27)	(England) Cardiff City	2025	2027
27	Ken Matsubara	(Japan)	6 February 1993 (age 33)	(Japan) Albirex Niigata	2017	
33	Kosei Suwama	(Japan)	6 June 2003 (age 23)	(Japan) Tsukuba University	2025	2027
35	Kanta Sekitomi	(Japan)	23 October 2005 (age 21)	(Japan) Toin University	2025	
44	Thomas Deng	(Australia) (Kenya)	20 March 1997 (age 29)	(Japan) Albirex Niigata	2025	
49	Kei Murakami	(Japan)	11 April 2007 (age 19)	(Japan) Kumamoto Ozu High School	2026	2027
Midfielders
6	Kota Watanabe	(Japan)	18 October 1998 (age 28)	(Japan) Tokyo Verdy	2019	2027
8	Takuya Kida	(Japan)	23 August 1994 (age 32)	Youth Team	2012	
25	Toichi Suzuki	(Japan)	30 May 2000 (age 26)	(Japan) Kyoto Sanga	2025	
28	Riku Yamane	(Japan)	24 August 2003 (age 23)	Youth Team	2022	2027
29	Aruto Higuchi	(Japan)	10 March 2005 (age 21)	(Japan) Chubu University	2025	
32	Yuta Tanaka	(Japan)	11 October 2002 (age 24)	(Japan) Keio University	2025	
34	Takuto Kimura	(Japan)	3 July 1991 (age 35)	(Japan) Ehime FC	2023	2024
40	Jun Amano	(Japan)	19 July 1991 (age 35)	(South Korea) Jeonbuk Hyundai Motors	2014	2027
41	Kosuke Matsumura	(Japan)	2 May 2004 (age 22)	(Japan) Hosei University	2025	
Strikers
7	Daiya Tono	(Japan)	14 March 1999 (age 27)	(Japan) Kawasaki Frontale	2025	2027
9	Kaina Tanimura	(Japan)	5 March 1998 (age 28)	(Japan) Iwaki FC	2025	
11	Jordy Croux	(Belgium)	15 January 1994 (age 32)	(Japan) Júbilo Iwata	2025	2027
18	George Onaiwu	(Japan) (Nigeria)	11 November 2000 (age 25)	(Japan) Vegalta Sendai	2025	
19	Tevis Gabriel	(Brazil)	28 January 2006 (age 20)	(Brazil) Cruzeiro	2026	2026
23	Ryo Miyaichi	(Japan)	14 December 1992 (age 33)	(Germany) FC St. Pauli	2021	
24	Tomoki Kondo	(Japan)	21 March 2001 (age 25)	(Japan) Hokkaido Consadole Sapporo	2026	2027
26	Dean David	(Israel)	14 March 1996 (age 30)	(Israel) Maccabi Haifa	2025	2027
30	Yuri Araujo	(Brazil)	13 April 1996 (age 30)	(Portugal) Viseu	2025	2028
46	Hiroto Asada	(Japan)	16 January 2008 (age 18)	Youth Team	2023	2027
Players who are on loan to other club
42	Kohei Mochizuki	(Japan)	7 June 2006 (age 20)	Youth Team	2023	
43	Reno Noguchi	(Japan)	30 May 2006 (age 20)	Youth Team	2025	
45	Kodjo Aziangbe	(Togo)	14 December 2003 (age 22)	(Saudi Arabia) Al Nassr FC	2024	2026
Players who left during mid-season

== Club official ==
Position	Name
Manager	(Japan) Fumitake Miura
Assistant manager	(Japan) Ryo Adachi (Japan) Hideo Oshima (Australia) Patrick Kisnorbo
Fitness coach	(Japan) Tomoo Tsukoshi
Goalkeeper coach	(Japan) Shigetatsu Matsunaga
Assistant goalkeeper coach	(Japan) Tetsuya Enomoto
Conditioning coach	(Japan) Yusuke Tanaka
Chief analyst	(Japan) Satoru Okada
Analyst	(Japan) Jun Yamaguchi
Performance data analyst	(Japan) Yuki Masui

== Transfers ==
=== In ===
Pre-season

Date	Position	Player	Transferred from	Ref
Permanent Transfer
19 December 2025	GK	(Japan) Yuya Tsuboi	(Japan) Vissel Kobe	Free
23 December 2025	DF	(Japan) Eitaro Matsuda	(Japan) Sagan Tosu	End of loan
24 December 2025	MF	(Japan) Tomoki Kondo	(Japan) Hokkaido Consadole Sapporo	Free
25 December 2025	DF	(Japan) Manato Yoshida	(Japan) Oita Trinita	End of loan
25 December 2025	DF	(Japan) Taisei Inoue	(Japan) Sagan Tosu	Free
31 December 2025	GK	(Japan) Tomoki Tagawa	(Japan) Kataller Toyama	End of loan
4 January 2026	MF	(Japan) Kohei Mochizuki	(Japan) Tegevajaro Miyazaki	End of loan
January 2026	MF	(Brazil) Rezende	(Brazil) Bahia	Free
Loan Transfer
9 January 2026	FW	(Brazil) Tevis Gabriel	(Brazil) Cruzeiro	Loan till Dec-26

Post-season

Date	Position	Player	Transferred from	Ref
Permanent Transfer
17 June 2026	FW	(Japan) Kei Chinen	(Japan) Kashima Antlers	Undisclosed
30 June 2026	GK	(Japan) Tomoki Tagawa	(Japan) Hokkaido Consadole Sapporo	End of loan
30 June 2026	MF	(Japan) Kohei Mochizuki	(Japan) Tegevajaro Miyazaki	End of loan
30 June 2026	DF	(Japan) Reno Noguchi	(Japan) Azul Claro Numazu	End of loan
June 2026	GK	(Spain) Ruben Blanco	(Spain) Girona	Undisclosed
Loan Transfer

=== Out ===
Pre-season

Date	Position	Player	Transferred To	Ref
Permanent Transfer
20 December 2025	FW	(Japan) Asahi Uenaka	(Japan) Gamba Osaka	Free
21 December 2025	FW	(Japan) Yuhi Murakami	(Japan) Kamatamare Sanuki	Free
24 December 2025	DF	(Japan) Eitaro Matsuda	(Japan) Roasso Kumamoto	Free
25 December 2025	DF	(Japan) Manato Yoshida	(Japan) Oita Trinita	Free
25 December 2025	MF	(Japan) Kenta Inoue	(Japan) Shimizu S-Pulse	Free
Loan Transfer
26 December 2025	GK	(Japan) Tomoki Tagawa	(Japan) Hokkaido Consadole Sapporo	Season loan
5 January 2026	MF	(Japan) Kohei Mochizuki	(Japan) Tegevajaro Miyazaki	Season loan
9 January 2026	DF	(Japan) Reno Noguchi	(Japan) Azul Claro Numazu	Season loan
9 January 2026	MF	(Togo) Kodjo Aziangbe	(China) Shanghai Port	Season loan

Post-season

Date	Position	Player	Transferred from	Ref
Permanent Transfer
June 2026	FW	(Japan) Kōta Watanabe	(Japan) Vissel Kobe	Undisclosed
Loan Transfer
9 January 2026	MF	(Togo) Kodjo Aziangbe	(China) Shanghai Port	Season loan
17 June 2026	GK	(Japan) Tomoki Tagawa	(Japan) Hokkaido Consadole Sapporo	Season loan

== Friendly & Pre-season ==
Win Draw Loss

=== Tour of Miyazaki (19 Jan - 29 Jan) ===
22 January 1	Zweigen Kanazawa	1–0	Yokohama F.Marinos	Miyazaki
		Report	Goal	Stadium: Amino Vital Training Center Miyazaki

25 January 2	Yokohama FC	1–3	Yokohama F.Marinos	Miyazaki
	83'	Report	Jordi Crux 79'; Ryotaro Tsunoda 95'; Yuri Araujo 101'	Stadium: Amino Vital Training Center Miyazaki

== Competitions ==
=== J1 League ===
Pos	Team	Pld	W	PKW	PKL	L	GF	GA	GD	Pts	Qualification
1	Kashima Antlers	18	13	2	2	1	29	9	+20	45	Final
2	FC Tokyo	18	9	4	2	3	28	16	+12	37	3rd–4th place playoff
3	Machida Zelvia	18	8	5	3	2	23	19	+4	37	5th–6th place playoff
4	Kawasaki Frontale	18	7	3	1	7	23	27	−4	28	7th–8th place playoff
5	Tokyo Verdy	18	7	3	1	7	19	25	−6	28	9th–10th place playoff
6	Urawa Red Diamonds	18	7	0	4	7	25	18	+7	25	11th–12th place playoff
7	Yokohama F. Marinos	18	6	0	2	10	28	29	−1	20	13th–14th place playoff
8	Kashiwa Reysol	18	6	1	0	11	21	24	−3	20	15th–16th place playoff
9	Mito HollyHock	18	2	4	4	8	19	35	−16	18	17th–18th place playoff
10	JEF United Chiba	18	3	0	3	12	18	31	−13	12	19th–20th place playoff

Source: JLeague.co, J.League Data Site
Rules for classification: 1) Points; 2) Goal difference; 3) Goals scored; 4) Head-to-head.

==== Matches ====
6 February 1	Yokohama F. Marinos	2–3	Machida Zelvia	Yokohama
	Daiya Tōno 16' (pen.); Jordy Croux 67'; Ryo Miyaichi (yellow card) 47'	Report	Yuki Soma 45+2'; Erik 8', 17'	Stadium: Nissan Stadium; Attendance: 30,529; Referee: Yusuke Araki

14 February 2	Kashima Antlers	1–0	Yokohama F. Marinos	Tokyo
	Léo Ceará 76'; Kei Chinen (yellow card) 61'	Report	Jeisson Quinones (yellow card) 19'	Stadium: Japan National Stadium; Attendance: 31,091; Referee: Akihiko Ikeuchi

21 February 3	Yokohama F. Marinos	0–2	Urawa Red Diamonds	Yokohama
	Riku Yamane (yellow card) 33'	Report	Takahiro Sekine 55' (yellow card) 10'; Jumpei Hayakawa 84'; Matheus Sávio (yellow card) 63'	Stadium: Nissan Stadium; Attendance: 27,391; Referee: Masuya Ueda

28 February 4	Yokohama F. Marinos	3–2	Tokyo Verdy	Yokohama
	Kaina Tanimura 45+4'; Daiya Tōno 47'; Riku Yamane 49' (yellow card) 58'	Report	Itsuki Someno 69' (yellow card) 73'; Taiju Yoshida 90+2'; Yosuke Uchida (yellow card) 26'; Yuta Arai (yellow card) 62'	Stadium: Nissan Stadium; Attendance: 21,122; Referee: Koichiro Fukushima

7 March 5	FC Tokyo	3–0	Yokohama F. Marinos	Chōfu
	Motoki Nagakura 1'; Ryūnosuke Satō 21'; Marcelo Ryan 46'	Report	Takuya Kiya (yellow card) 38'; Takuto Kimura (yellow card) 65'	Stadium: Ajinomoto Stadium; Referee: Koei Koya

14 March 6	Yokohama F. Marinos	2–0	JEF United Chiba	Yokohama
	Daiya Tōno 52'; Kaina Tanimura 74'; Jeisson Quinones (yellow card) 40'; Kota Watanabe (yellow card) 72'	Report		Stadium: Nissan Stadium; Attendance: 24,596; Referee: Daichi Shiino

18 March 7	Mito HollyHock	1–0	Yokohama F. Marinos	Ibaraki
	Keisuke Tada 62'; Sho Omori (yellow card) 48'	Report		Stadium: K's denki Stadium Mito; Attendance: 7,122; Referee: Hayato Shimizu

22 March 8	Kawasaki Frontale	0–5	Yokohama F. Marinos	Kawasaki
		Report	Kaina Tanimura 30'; Jun Amano 53', 62'; Yuri Araujo 72'; Jeisson Quinones 78'; Daiya Tōno (yellow card) 45+2'	Stadium: Kawasaki Todoroki Stadium; Attendance: 50,275; Referee: Akihiko Ikeuchi

5 April 9	Kashiwa Reysol	3–0	Yokohama F. Marinos	Chiba
	Yōta Komi 19' (pen.); Koya Yuruki 81'; Hayato Nakama 83'; Tomoaki Ōkubo (yellow card) 88'	Report	Jeisson Quinones (red card) 13'	Stadium: Sankyo Frontier Kashiwa Stadium; Attendance: 13,515; Referee: Yusuke Ohashi

11 April 10	Yokohama F. Marinos	1–3	FC Tokyo	Yokohama
	Ren Kato 75'	Report	Kein Sato 45'; Marcelo Ryan 65'; Hiroto Asada 79' (o.g.); Sei Muroya (yellow card) 50'; Kei Koizumi (yellow card) 83'	Stadium: Nissan Stadium; Attendance: 23,570; Referee: Koichiro Fukushima

18 April 11	Yokohama F. Marinos	1–2	Kawasaki Frontale	Yokohama
	Jun Amano 45+2'; Jordy Croux (yellow card) 17'	Report	Lazar Romanić 15'; Erison 90+8' (yellow card) 90+9'	Stadium: Nissan Stadium; Attendance: 26,084; Referee: Atsushi Kamimura

25 April 12	Urawa Red Diamonds	2–3	Yokohama F. Marinos	Saitama
	Takuro Kaneko 29'; Jeisson Quinones 90' (o.g.); Kai Shibato (yellow card) 90+2'	Report	Riku Yamane 21'; Kota Watanabe 63'; Jun Amano 79'; Kaina Tanimura (yellow card) 5'	Stadium: Saitama Stadium 2002; Attendance: 32,797; Referee: Koei Koya

29 April 13	JEF United Chiba	2–3	Yokohama F. Marinos	Chiba
	Carlinhos Junior 19' (pen.); Hiroto Goya 90+8'	Report	Kaina Tanimura 48', 58'; Taisei Inoue 63'	Stadium: Fukuda Denshi Arena; Attendance: 16,168; Referee: Koji Takasaki

2 May 14	Yokohama F. Marinos	1–1 (1–3 p)	Mito HollyHock	Yokohama
	Kaina Tanimura 5'; Kosei Suwama (yellow card) 73'	Report	Arata Watanabe 27'; Danilo Cardoso (yellow card) 33'	Stadium: Nissan Stadium; Attendance: 23,997; Referee: Hayato Shimizu
	Penalties
	Jordy Croux (penalty missed); Dean David (penalty scored); Jun Amano (penalty missed); Jeisson Quinones (penalty missed)		Koshi Osaki (penalty scored); Ryo Nemoto (penalty scored); Sho Omori (penalty scored)

6 May 15	Machida Zelvia	2–0	Yokohama F. Marinos	Tokyo
	Erik 54'; Shota Fujio 67'; Daihachi Okamura (yellow card) 40'	Report		Stadium: Machida GION Stadium; Attendance: 13,616; Referee: Hiroyuki Kimura

10 May 16	Yokohama F. Marinos	1–1 (2–4 p)	Kashima Antlers	Yokohama
	Kaina Tanimura 58'	Report	Léo Ceará 90+5'	Stadium: Nissan Stadium; Attendance: 32,182; Referee: Yuzo Sutani
	Penalties
	Taisei Inoue (penalty scored); Dean David (penalty scored); Ryo Miyachi (penalty missed); Kota Watanabe (penalty missed)		Aleksandar Čavrić (penalty scored); Yuma Suzuki (penalty scored); Léo Ceará (penalty scored); Naomichi Ueda (penalty scored)

16 May 17	Yokohama F. Marinos	0–1	Kashiwa Reysol	Yokohama
	Ryotaro Tsunoda (yellow card) 46'; Ren Kato (yellow card) 83'	Report	Koya Yuruki 41'; Hiromu Mitsumaru (yellow card) 79'	Stadium: Nissan Stadium; Attendance: 26,122; Referee: Atsushi Kamimura

24 May 18	Tokyo Verdy	0–6	Yokohama F. Marinos	Chōfu
		Report	Tomoki Kondo 25'; Kaina Tanimura 36', 46' (yellow card) 67'; Yuri Araujo 46', 58'; Tevis Gabriel 90' (yellow card) 90+1'	Stadium: Ajinomoto Stadium; Attendance: 20,736; Referee: Yusuke Araki

31 May Placement Leg 1	Shimizu S-Pulse	1–1	Yokohama F. Marinos	Shizuoka
	Kazuki Kozuka 56'; Mateus Brunetti (yellow card) 61'	Report	Kaina Tanimura 72'	Stadium: IAI Stadium Nihondaira; Attendance: 13,948; Referee: Koei Koya

6 June Placement Leg 2	Yokohama F. Marinos	3–0 (4–1 agg.)	Shimizu S-Pulse	Yokohama
	Jun Amano 29', 66'; Taisei Inoue 89'	Report	Yuki Honda (yellow card) 45+4'; Capixaba (yellow card) 76'	Stadium: Nissan Stadium; Attendance: 27,856; Referee: Yuzo Sutani

== Team statistics ==
=== Appearances and goals ===
As of 6 June 2026

No.	Pos.	Player	J1 League		Total	
No.	Pos.	Player	Apps	Goals	Apps	Goals
1	GK	(South Korea) Park Il-gyu	11+1	0	12	0
2	DF	(Japan) Ren Kato	20	1	20	1
6	MF	(Japan) Kota Watanabe	15+2	1	17	1
7	FW	(Japan) Daiya Tono	7	3	7	3
8	MF	(Japan) Takuya Kida	2+6	0	8	0
9	FW	(Japan) Kaina Tanimura	17+2	10	19	10
11	FW	(Belgium) Jordy Croux	13+8	1	21	1
13	DF	(Japan) Taisei Inoue	17+1	1	18	1
15	DF	(Japan) Taiki Watanabe	0	0	0	0
17	DF	(Colombia) Jeison Quiñónes	17+1	1	18	1
18	FW	(Japan) (Nigeria) George Onaiwu	4	0	4	0
19	FW	(Brazil) Tevis Gabriel	2+12	1	14	1
20	GK	(Japan) Yuya Tsuboi	0	0	0	0
21	GK	(Japan) Hiroki Iikura	1	0	1	0
22	DF	(Japan) Ryotaro Tsunoda	13	0	13	0
23	FW	(Japan) Ryo Miyaichi	2+12	0	14	0
24	FW	(Japan) Tomoki Kondo	9+8	1	17	1
25	MF	(Japan) Toichi Suzuki	0	0	0	0
26	FW	(Israel) Dean David	3+9	0	12	0
27	DF	(Japan) Ken Matsubara	0	0	0	0
28	MF	(Japan) Riku Yamane	20	2	20	2
29	MF	(Japan) Aruto Higuchi	1+6	0	7	0
30	FW	(Brazil) Yuri Araujo	12+1	3	13	3
31	GK	(Japan) Ryoya Kimura	8+1	0	9	0
32	MF	(Japan) Yuta Tanaka	0	0	0	0
33	DF	(Japan) Kosei Suwama	4+3	0	7	0
34	MF	(Japan) Takuto Kimura	4+6	0	10	0
35	DF	(Japan) Kanta Sekitomi	4+3	0	7	0
40	MF	(Japan) Jun Amano	10+9	5	19	5
41	MF	(Japan) Kosuke Matsumura	0	0	0	0
44	DF	(Australia) (Kenya) Thomas Deng	3+1	0	4	0
46	FW	(Japan) Hiroto Asada	1+9	0	10	0
49	DF	(Japan) Kei Murakami	0	0	0	0
