= 2024 AFC Champions League final =

- Event: 2023–24 AFC Champions League
Yokohama F. Marinos	Al Ain
(Japan)	(United Arab Emirates)
3	6
- on aggregate

First leg
Yokohama F. Marinos	Al Ain
2	1
- Date: 11 May 2024
- Venue: Nissan Stadium, Yokohama
- Referee: Salman Falahi (Qatar)
- Attendance: 53,704

Second leg
Al Ain	Yokohama F. Marinos
5	1
- Date: 25 May 2024
- Venue: Hazza bin Zayed Stadium, Al Ain
- Referee: Ilgiz Tantashev (Uzbekistan)
- Attendance: 24,826

The 2024 AFC Champions League final was the final of the 2023–24 AFC Champions League, the 42nd edition of the top-level Asian club football tournament organized by the Asian Football Confederation (AFC), and the 21st edition under the AFC Champions League title.

The final was contested in two-legged home-and-away format between Yokohama F. Marinos from Japan and Al Ain from the United Arab Emirates. The winners earned the final Asian berth at the 2025 FIFA Club World Cup in the United States.

This final was the second for Yokohama F. Marinos after 1990, and the fourth for Al Ain, with their most recent in 2016.

== Teams ==
In the following table, the finals until 2002 were in the Asian Club Championship era, and since 2003 in the AFC Champions League era.

Team	Region (Federation)	Previous finals appearances (bold indicates winners)
(Japan) Yokohama F. Marinos	East (EAFF)	1 (1990)
(United Arab Emirates) Al Ain	West (WAFF)	3 (**2003**, 2005, 2016)

== Road to the final ==
Note: In all results below, the score of the finalist is given first. (H: home; A: away).

(Japan) Yokohama F. Marinos				Round	(United Arab Emirates) Al Ain			
Opponent	Result			Group stage	Opponent	Result		
(South Korea) Incheon United	2–4 (H)			Matchday 1	(Uzbekistan) Pakhtakor	3–0 (A)		
(China) Shandong Taishan	1–0 (A)			Matchday 2	(Turkmenistan) Ahal	4–2 (H)		
(Philippines) Kaya–Iloilo	3–0 (H)			Matchday 3	(Saudi Arabia) Al-Fayha	4–1 (H)		
(Philippines) Kaya–Iloilo	2–1 (A)			Matchday 4	(Saudi Arabia) Al-Fayha	3–2 (A)		
(South Korea) Incheon United	1–2 (A)			Matchday 5	(Uzbekistan) Pakhtakor	1–3 (H)		
(China) Shandong Taishan	3–0 (H)			Matchday 6	(Turkmenistan) Ahal	3–1 (A)		
**Group G winner**: Pos / Team / Pld / Pts; **1** / (Japan) Yokohama F. Marinos / **6** / **12**; 2 / (China) Shandong Taishan / 6 / **12**; 3 / (South Korea) Incheon United / 6 / **12**; 4 / (Philippines) Kaya–Iloilo / 6 / **0**; Source: AFC				Final standings	**Group A winner**: Pos / Team / Pld / Pts; **1** / (United Arab Emirates) Al-Ain / **6** / **15**; 2 / (Saudi Arabia) Al-Fayha / 6 / **9**; 3 / (Uzbekistan) Pakhtakor / 6 / **7**; 4 / (Turkmenistan) Ahal / 6 / **4**; Source: AFC			
Opponent	Agg.	1st leg	2nd leg	Knockout stage	Opponent	Agg.	1st leg	2nd leg
(Thailand) Bangkok United	3–2 (a.e.t.)	2–2 (A)	1–0 (H)	Round of 16	(Uzbekistan) Nasaf	2–1	0–0 (A)	2–1 (H)
(China) Shandong Taishan	3–1	2–1 (A)	1–0 (H)	Quarter-finals	(Saudi Arabia) Al Nassr	4–4 (a.e.t.) (3–1 p)	1–0 (H)	3–4 (A)
(South Korea) Ulsan HD	3–3 (a.e.t.) (5–4 p)	0–1 (A)	3–2 (H)	Semi-finals	(Saudi Arabia) Al Hilal	5–4	4–2 (H)	1–2 (A)

== Format ==
The final was played over two legs. If the aggregate score would be level after two legs, extra time and, if necessary, a penalty shoot-out would be used to decide the winning team.

== Matches ==
=== First leg ===
==== Details ====
11 May 2024
19:00 UTC+9

Yokohama F. Marinos (Japan)	2–1	(United Arab Emirates) Al Ain
Uenaka 72'; K. Watanabe 84'	Report	Abbas 12'

Nissan Stadium, Yokohama
Attendance: 53,704
Referee: Salman Falahi (Qatar)

**Yokohama F. Marinos**	**Al Ain**

GK	42	(Japan) William Popp
RB	27	(Japan) Ken Matsubara
CB	4	(Japan) Shinnosuke Hatanaka
CB	5	(Brazil) Eduardo		(substituted off) 37'
LB	2	(Japan) Katsuya Nagato	(yellow card) 90+3'
CM	14	(Japan) Asahi Uenaka	(yellow card) 75'	(substituted off) 77'
CM	8	(Japan) Takuya Kida (c)		(substituted off) 61'
CM	29	(South Korea) Nam Tae-hee		(substituted off) 77'
RF	20	(Brazil) Yan Matheus
CF	11	(Brazil) Anderson Lopes
LF	7	(Brazil) Élber		(substituted off) 61'
Substitutes:
GK	21	(Japan) Hiroki Iikura
GK	31	(Japan) Fuma Shirasaka
DF	16	(Japan) Ren Kato
DF	24	(Japan) Hijiri Kato
DF	39	(Japan) Taiki Watanabe		(substituted on) 37'
MF	6	(Japan) Kota Watanabe		(substituted on) 61'
MF	17	(Japan) Kenta Inoue
MF	18	(Japan) Kota Mizunuma
MF	28	(Japan) Riku Yamane		(substituted on) 77'
MF	35	(Japan) Keigo Sakakibara		(substituted on) 77'
MF	47	(Japan) Kazuya Yamamura
FW	23	(Japan) Ryo Miyaichi		(substituted on) 61'
Manager:
(Australia) Harry Kewell

GK	17	(United Arab Emirates) Khalid Eisa
RB	70	(Mali) Abdoul Karim Traoré
CB	16	(United Arab Emirates) Khalid Al-Hashemi
CB	3	(United Arab Emirates) Kouame Autonne
LB	11	(United Arab Emirates) Bandar Al-Ahbabi (c)
CM	8	(United Arab Emirates) Mohammed Abbas		(substituted off) 90+4'
CM	5	(South Korea) Park Yong-woo	(yellow card) 90+5'
CM	6	(United Arab Emirates) Yahia Nader
RF	10	(Paraguay) Kaku
CF	21	(Morocco) Soufiane Rahimi
LF	20	(Argentina) Matías Palacios
Substitutes:
GK	1	(United Arab Emirates) Mohammed Abo Sandah
GK	12	(United Arab Emirates) Sultan Al-Mantheri
DF	4	(United Arab Emirates) Mohammed Ali Shaker
DF	40	(United Arab Emirates) Khalid Ali Al-Baloushi
DF	44	(United Arab Emirates) Saeed Juma
DF	66	(United Arab Emirates) Mansour Al-Shamsi
MF	13	(United Arab Emirates) Ahmed Barman
MF	18	(United Arab Emirates) Khalid Al-Balochi
MF	22	(United Arab Emirates) Falah Waleed
MF	27	(United Arab Emirates) Sultan Al-Shamsi		(substituted on) 90+4'
MF	30	(United Arab Emirates) Hazem Mohammad
Manager:
(Argentina) Hernán Crespo

=== Second leg ===
==== Details ====
25 May 2024
18:00 UTC+4

Al Ain (United Arab Emirates)	5–1	(Japan) Yokohama F. Marinos
Rahimi 8', 67'; Kaku 33' (pen.); Laba 90+1', 90+5'	Report	Yan Matheus 40'

Hazza bin Zayed Stadium, Al-Ain
Attendance: 24,826
Referee: Ilgiz Tantashev (Uzbekistan)

**Al Ain**	**Yokohama F. Marinos**

GK	17	(United Arab Emirates) Khalid Eisa
RB	11	(United Arab Emirates) Bandar Al-Ahbabi (c)
CB	16	(United Arab Emirates) Khalid Al-Hashemi
CB	3	(United Arab Emirates) Kouame Autonne
LB	44	(United Arab Emirates) Saeed Juma		(substituted off) 58'
CM	6	(United Arab Emirates) Yahia Nader		(substituted off) 89'
CM	5	(South Korea) Park Yong-woo
CM	8	(United Arab Emirates) Mohammed Abbas		(substituted off) 84'
AM	10	(Paraguay) Kaku	(yellow card) 90+9'
CF	20	(Argentina) Matías Palacios
CF	21	(Morocco) Soufiane Rahimi	(yellow card) 68'
Substitutes:
GK	1	(United Arab Emirates) Mohammed Abo Sandah
GK	12	(United Arab Emirates) Sultan Al-Mantheri
DF	4	(United Arab Emirates) Mohammed Ali Shaker
DF	40	(United Arab Emirates) Khalid Ali Al-Baloushi
DF	66	(United Arab Emirates) Mansour Al-Shamsi
MF	13	(United Arab Emirates) Ahmed Barman		(substituted on) 84'
MF	18	(United Arab Emirates) Khalid Al-Balochi
MF	22	(United Arab Emirates) Falah Waleed		(substituted on) 89'
MF	27	(United Arab Emirates) Sultan Al-Shamsi
MF	30	(United Arab Emirates) Hazem Mohammad
FW	9	(Togo) Kodjo Laba		(substituted on) 58'
Manager:
(Argentina) Hernán Crespo

GK	42	(Japan) William Popp (red card) 45+10'
RB	27	(Japan) Ken Matsubara
CB	15	(Japan) Takumi Kamijima
CB	4	(Japan) Shinnosuke Hatanaka		(substituted off) 62'
LB	2	(Japan) Katsuya Nagato
CM	8	(Japan) Takuya Kida (c)		(substituted off) 63'
CM	6	(Japan) Kota Watanabe
RW	20	(Brazil) Yan Matheus		(substituted off) 78'
AM	14	(Japan) Asahi Uenaka		(substituted off) 46'
LW	7	(Brazil) Élber		(substituted off) 45+14'
CF	11	(Brazil) Anderson Lopes
Substitutes:
GK	21	(Japan) Hiroki Iikura
GK	31	(Japan) Fuma Shirasaka		(substituted on) 45+14'
DF	5	(Brazil) Eduardo		(substituted on) 62'
DF	16	(Japan) Ren Kato
DF	24	(Japan) Hijiri Kato
MF	17	(Japan) Kenta Inoue
MF	18	(Japan) Kota Mizunuma
MF	28	(Japan) Riku Yamane		(substituted on) 63'
MF	35	(Japan) Keigo Sakakibara		(substituted on) 46'
MF	40	(Japan) Jun Amano
MF	47	(Japan) Kazuya Yamamura
FW	23	(Japan) Ryo Miyaichi		(substituted on) 78'
Manager:
(Australia) Harry Kewell			(yellow card) 90+3'
