= 2026–27 Yokohama F. Marinos season =

Yokohama F. Marinos
2026–27 season
- Chairman: Akihiro Nakayama
- Manager: (Australia) Steve Corica
- Stadium: Nissan Stadium
Home colours	Away colours
- All statistics correct as of 19 April 2025.

The 2026–27 Yokohama F. Marinos season is the club's 54th season in existence.

== Players ==
No.	Name	Nationality	Date of birth (age)	Previous club	Contract since	Contract end
Goalkeepers
1	Park Il-gyu	(Japan) (South Korea)	22 December 1989 (age 36)	(Japan) Sagan Tosu	2025	2027
20	Yuya Tsuboi	(Japan)	23 August 1999 (age 27)	(Japan) Omiya Ardija	2026	2027
21	Hiroki Iikura	(Japan)	1 June 1986 (age 40)	(Japan) Vissel Kobe	2023	2024
36	Ruben Blanco	(Spain)	25 July 1995 (age 31)	(Spain) Girona	2026	2027
	Ryo Hirano	(Japan)	17 February 2008 (age 18)	Youth Team	2026	2027
Defenders
13	Taisei Inoue	(Japan)	1 October 2002 (age 24)	(Japan) Sagan Tosu	2026	2027
15	Taiki Watanabe	(Japan)	22 April 1999 (age 27)	(Japan) Albirex Niigata	2024	
17	Jeison Quiñónes	(Colombia)	17 August 1997 (age 29)	(Colombia) Águilas Doradas	2025	
22	Ryotaro Tsunoda	(Japan)	27 June 1999 (age 27)	(England) Cardiff City	2025	2027
27	Ken Matsubara	(Japan)	6 February 1993 (age 33)	(Japan) Albirex Niigata	2017	
33	Kosei Suwama	(Japan)	6 June 2003 (age 23)	(Japan) Tsukuba University	2025	2027
35	Kanta Sekitomi	(Japan)	23 October 2005 (age 21)	(Japan) Toin University	2025	
44	Thomas Deng	(Australia) (Kenya)	20 March 1997 (age 29)	(Japan) Albirex Niigata	2025	
54	Shota Fujii	(Japan)	11 August 2008 (age 18)	Youth Team	2026	2027
55	Kanata Hirano	(Japan) (Canada)	23 September 2008 (age 18)	Youth Team	2026	2027
Midfielders
8	Takuya Kida	(Japan)	23 August 1994 (age 32)	Youth Team	2012	
25	Toichi Suzuki	(Japan)	30 May 2000 (age 26)	(Japan) Kyoto Sanga	2025	
28	Riku Yamane	(Japan)	24 August 2003 (age 23)	Youth Team	2022	2027
32	Yuta Tanaka	(Japan)	11 October 2002 (age 24)	(Japan) Keio University	2025	
34	Takuto Kimura	(Japan)	3 July 1991 (age 35)	(Japan) Ehime FC	2023	2024
40	Jun Amano	(Japan)	19 July 1991 (age 35)	(South Korea) Jeonbuk Hyundai Motors	2014	2027
41	Kosuke Matsumura	(Japan)	2 May 2004 (age 22)	(Japan) Hosei University	2025	
Strikers
7	Daiya Tono	(Japan)	14 March 1999 (age 27)	(Japan) Kawasaki Frontale	2025	2027
9	Kaina Tanimura	(Japan)	5 March 1998 (age 28)	(Japan) Iwaki FC	2025	
11	Jordy Croux	(Belgium)	15 January 1994 (age 32)	(Japan) Júbilo Iwata	2025	2027
14	Kei Chinen	(Japan)	17 March 1995 (age 31)	(Japan) Kashima Antlers	2026	
18	George Onaiwu	(Japan) (Nigeria)	11 November 2000 (age 26)	(Japan) Vegalta Sendai	2025	
19	Tevis Gabriel	(Brazil)	28 January 2006 (age 20)	(Brazil) Cruzeiro	2026	2026
23	Ryo Miyaichi	(Japan)	14 December 1992 (age 33)	(Germany) FC St. Pauli	2021	
24	Tomoki Kondo	(Japan)	21 March 2001 (age 25)	(Japan) Hokkaido Consadole Sapporo	2026	2027
26	Dean David	(Israel)	14 March 1996 (age 30)	(Israel) Maccabi Haifa	2025	2027
30	Yuri Araujo	(Brazil)	13 April 1996 (age 30)	(Portugal) Viseu	2025	2028
43	Rio Nitta	(Japan)	10 April 2003 (age 23)	(Japan) Urawa Red Diamonds	2026	
46	Hiroto Asada	(Japan)	16 January 2008 (age 18)	Youth Team	2023	2027
47	Shin Miidera	(Japan)	2 April 2010 (age 16)	Youth Team	2026	2027
Players who are on loan to other club
29	Aruto Higuchi	(Japan)	10 March 2005 (age 21)	(Japan) Chubu University	2025	
31	Ryoya Kimura	(Japan)	10 June 2003 (age 23)	(Japan) Nihon University	2025	2027
42	Kohei Mochizuki	(Japan)	7 June 2006 (age 20)	(Japan) Tegevajaro Miyazaki	2023	
43	Reno Noguchi	(Japan)	30 May 2006 (age 20)	(Japan) Azul Claro Numazu	2025	
45	Kodjo Aziangbe	(Togo)	14 December 2003 (age 22)	(Saudi Arabia) Al Nassr FC	2024	2026
49	Kei Murakami	(Japan)	11 April 2007 (age 19)	(Japan) Kumamoto Ozu High School	2026	2027
Players who left during mid-season

== Club official ==
Position	Name
Manager	(Australia) Steve Corica
Assistant manager	(Japan) Ryo Adachi (Japan) Hideo Oshima (New Zealand) Danny Hay
Fitness coach	(Japan) Tomoo Tsukoshi
Goalkeeper coach	(Japan) Shigetatsu Matsunaga
Assistant goalkeeper coach	(Japan) Tetsuya Enomoto
Conditioning coach	(Japan) Yusuke Tanaka
Chief analyst	(Japan) Satoru Okada
Analyst	(Japan) Jun Yamaguchi
Performance data analyst	(Japan) Yuki Masui

== Transfers ==
=== In ===
Pre-season

Date	Position	Player	Transferred from	Ref
Permanent Transfer
17 June 2026	FW	(Japan) Kei Chinen	(Japan) Kashima Antlers	Undisclosed
30 June 2026	GK	(Japan) Tomoki Tagawa	(Japan) Hokkaido Consadole Sapporo	End of loan
30 June 2026	MF	(Japan) Kohei Mochizuki	(Japan) Tegevajaro Miyazaki	End of loan
30 June 2026	DF	(Japan) Reno Noguchi	(Japan) Azul Claro Numazu	End of loan
26 June 2026	GK	(Spain) Ruben Blanco	(Spain) Girona	Undisclosed
27 June 2026	FW	(Japan) Rio Nitta	(Japan) Urawa Red Diamonds	Undisclosed
Loan Transfer

=== Out ===
Pre-season

Date	Position	Player	Transferred to	Ref
Permanent Transfer
23 June 2026	FW	(Japan) Kōta Watanabe	(Japan) Vissel Kobe	Undisclosed
26 June 2026	DF	(Japan) Ren Kato	(Japan) Kyoto Sanga	Undisclosed
July 2026	DF	(Colombia) Jeison Quiñónes	(Colombia) Atlético Nacional	Undisclosed
Loan Transfer
9 January 2026	MF	(Togo) Kodjo Aziangbe	(China) Shanghai Port	Season loan
17 June 2026	GK	(Japan) Tomoki Tagawa	(Japan) Hokkaido Consadole Sapporo	Season loan
23 June 2026	DF	(Japan) Reno Noguchi	(Japan) Azul Claro Numazu	Season loan
23 June 2026	MF	(Japan) Kohei Mochizuki	(Japan) Zweigen Kanazawa	Season loan
26 June 2026	GK	(Japan) Ryoya Kimura	(Japan) Tegevajaro Miyazaki	Season loan
26 June 2026	DF	(Japan) Kei Murakami	(Japan) Matsumoto Yamaga	Season loan
11 September 2026	MF	(Japan) Aruto Higuchi	(Japan) Fukushima United	Season loan

== Friendly & Pre-season ==
Win Draw Loss

=== Tour of Miyazaki (12 - 25 July) ===
15 July 1	Yokohama F. Marinos	1–1	Tegevajaro Miyazaki	Miyazaki
	Jun Amano 45'	Report	90'	Stadium: Miyazaki Prefecture Outdoor Training Center

19 July 2	Yokohama F. Marinos	3–1	Roasso Kumamoto	Miyazaki
		Report		Stadium: Miyazaki Prefecture Outdoor Training Center

== Competitions ==
=== J1 League ===
Pos	Team	Pld	W	D	L	GF	GA	GD	Pts
5	Vissel Kobe	14	8	3	3	23	14	+9	27
6	Kashima Antlers	14	7	2	5	29	24	+5	23
7	Yokohama F. Marinos	14	5	7	2	21	15	+6	22
8	Kawasaki Frontale	14	6	4	4	28	24	+4	22
9	Urawa Red Diamonds	14	7	1	6	23	29	−6	22

Updated to match(es) played on 8 November 2026. Source: JLeague.jp,
Rules for classification: 1) Points; 2) Goal difference; 3) Goals scored; 4) Head-to-head points; 5) Head-to-head goal difference; 6) Head-to-head goals scored; 7) Fewer disciplinary points.

==== Matches ====
7 August 1	Yokohama F. Marinos	3–4	Kashima Antlers	Tokyo
	Shin Miidera 7'; Kaina Tanimura 18', 58'	Report	Léo Ceará 11', 81'; Aleksandar Čavrić 90+9' (pen.), 90+13'; Yuma Suzuki (yellow card) 25'	Stadium: MUFG Stadium; Attendance: 63,960; Referee: Hiroyuki Kimura

15 August 2	Shimizu S-Pulse	0–1	Yokohama F. Marinos	Shizuoka
	Ryo Germain (yellow card) 52'	Report	Taisei Inoue 79'	Stadium: IAI Stadium Nihondaira; Attendance: 19,077; Referee: Daichi Shiino

22 August 3	Yokohama F. Marinos	1–0	Vissel Kobe	Yokohama
	Shin Miidera 8' (yellow card) 48'; Ryotaro Tsunoda (yellow card) 36'; Kaina Tanimura (yellow card) 40'; Jun Amano (yellow card) 80'	Report	Yosuke Ideguchi (yellow card) 66'; Kota Watanabe (yellow card) 71'	Stadium: Nissan Stadium; Attendance: 36,601; Referee: Akihiko Ikeuchi

29 August 4	Urawa Red Diamonds	3–2	Yokohama F. Marinos	Saitama
	Matheus Savio 40'; Kenta Nemoto 64'; Harumi Minamino 71'; Ryoma Watanabe (yellow card) 90+3'	Report	Kaina Tanimura 38', 57'; Kosuke Matsumura (yellow card) 48'; Takuya Kida (yellow card) 81'; Jordy Croux (yellow card) 89'	Stadium: Saitama Stadium 2002; Attendance: 33,863; Referee: Harm Osmers (Germany)

2 September 5	Yokohama F. Marinos	1–1	Kyoto Sanga	Yokohama
	Kaina Tanimura 73' (pen.); Jeison Quinones (yellow card) 9'; Kosei Suwama (yellow card) 82'	Report	Ryuma Nakano 64'; Kyo Sato (yellow card) 72'	Stadium: Nissan Stadium; Attendance: 17,521; Referee: Jumpei Iida

6 September 6	Kashiwa Reysol	0–2	Yokohama F. Marinos	Chiba
	Keita Endo (yellow card) 43'	Report	Ryo Miyaichi 19'; Rio Nitta 48'; Kosei Suwama (yellow card) 38'	Stadium: Sankyo Frontier Kashiwa Stadium; Attendance: 10,694; Referee: Yusuke Ohasi

12 September 7	Machida Zelvia	1–1	Yokohama F. Marinos	Tokyo
	Henry Mochizuki 84'; Hotaka Nakamura (yellow card) 20'; Ryohei Shirasaki (yellow card) 45+4'; Takahiro Akimoto (yellow card) 72' (yellow-red card)	Report	Kaina Tanimura 12'; Tomoki Kondo (yellow card) 67'	Stadium: MUFG Stadium; Attendance: 48,623; Referee: Koji Takasaki

19 September 8	Yokohama F. Marinos	2–0	Mito HollyHock	Yokohama
	Jeison Quiñónes 8'; Riku Yamane 83'; Kei Chinen (yellow card) 24'; Takuya Kida (yellow card) 77'	Report	Yasuki Kimoto (yellow card) 25'; Jin Okumura (yellow card) 46'; Takumi Mase (yellow card) 82'	Stadium: Nissan Stadium; Attendance: 25,794; Referee: Koei Koya

10 October 9	Cerezo Osaka	0–0	Yokohama F. Marinos	Osaka
	Javi Hernandez (yellow card) 10'; Ayumu Ohata (yellow card) 28'; Jackson Irvine (yellow card) 50'	Report	Takuto Kimura (yellow card) 66'	Stadium: Yodoko Sakura Stadium; Attendance: 19,250; Referee: Koji Takasaki

17 October 10	JEF United Chiba	0–0	Yokohama F. Marinos	Chiba
	Takayuki Mae (yellow card) 68'; Boniface Nduka (yellow card) 75'; Erison (yellow card) 90+5'	Report	Tomoki Kondo (yellow card) 13'; Tōichi Suzuki (yellow card) 73'; Jordy Croux (yellow card) 90'	Stadium: Fukuda Denshi Arena; Attendance: 15,591; Referee: Futoshi Nakamura

21 October 11	Yokohama F. Marinos	2–2	Tokyo Verdy	Tokyo
	Ryo Miyaichi 23'; Daiya Tono 50'	Report	Kanya Fujimoto 73' (yellow card) 14'; Goki Yamada 90+3'; Kaito Suzuki (yellow card) 24'	Stadium: MUFG Stadium; Attendance: 40,765; Referee: Koei Koya

25 October 12	Nagoya Grampus	1–1	Yokohama F. Marinos	Toyota
	Yuya Yamagishi 73'; Takuya Uchida (yellow card) 53'	Report	Jordy Croux 13'; Takuto Kimura (yellow card) 55'	Stadium: Toyota Stadium; Attendance: 32,754; Referee: Koki Nagamine

1 November 13	Yokohama F. Marinos	4–2	Kawasaki Frontale	Yokohama
	Daiya Tono 12'; Tomoki Kondo 28'; Kaina Tanimura 42'; Jeison Quiñónes 56'; Hiroki Iikura (yellow card) 17'; Ryo Miyaichi (yellow card) 69'; Taisei Inoue (yellow card) 72'	Report	Filip Uremovic 33' (yellow card) 75'; Yuto Ozeki 90+3'	Stadium: Nissan Stadium; Attendance: 40,738; Referee: Daichi Shiino

7 November 14	Yokohama F. Marinos	1–1	Fagiano Okayama	Yokohama
	Tomoki Kondo 45+3'; Kosei Suwama (red card) 46'	Report	Noah Kenshin Browne 43' (yellow card) 44'; Yoshitake Suzuki (yellow card) 69'	Stadium: Nissan Stadium; Attendance: 24,544; Referee: Hiroyuki Kimura

21 November 15	Sanfrecce Hiroshima	2–2	Yokohama F. Marinos	Hiroshima
	Shun Ayukawa 29'; Daiki Suga 72'; Daiya Tono (yellow card) 32'	Report	Yuta Tanaka 66'; Rio Nitta 90+3'; Taishi Matsumoto (yellow card) 87'	Stadium: Edion Peace Wing Hiroshima; Attendance: 26,639; Referee: Koichiro Fukushima

25 November 16	Avispa Fukuoka	–	Yokohama F. Marinos	Fukuoka
		Report		Stadium: Best Denki Stadium

29 November 17	Yokohama F. Marinos	–	FC Tokyo	Yokohama
		Report		Stadium: Nissan Stadium

6 December 18	Gamba Osaka	–	Yokohama F. Marinos	Osaka
		Report		Stadium: Suita City Football Stadium

13 December 19	Yokohama F. Marinos	–	V-Varen Nagasaki	Yokohama
		Report		Stadium: Nissan Stadium

19 December 20	Vissel Kobe	–	Yokohama F. Marinos	Kobe
		Report		Stadium: Noevir Stadium Kobe

13-14 February 21	Kyoto Sanga	–	Yokohama F. Marinos	Kyoto
				Stadium: Sanga Stadium by Kyocera

20-21 February 22	Yokohama F. Marinos	–	Machida Zelvia	Yokohama
				Stadium: Nissan Stadium

27-28 February 23	Yokohama F. Marinos	–	Cerezo Osaka	Yokohama
				Stadium: Nissan Stadium

6 March 24	Tokyo Verdy	–	Yokohama F. Marinos	Chōfu
				Stadium: Ajinomoto Stadium

10 March 25	Fagiano Okayama	–	Yokohama F. Marinos	Okayama
				Stadium: City Light Stadium

13-14 March 26	Yokohama F. Marinos	–	Avispa Fukuoka	Yokohama
				Stadium: Nissan Stadium

20-21 March 27	Yokohama F. Marinos	–	Urawa Reds Diamonds	Yokohama
				Stadium: Nissan Stadium

3-4 April 28	Kashima Antlers	–	Yokohama F. Marinos	Kashima
				Stadium: Kashima Soccer Stadium

10-11 April 29	Yokohama F. Marinos	–	Sanfrecce Hiroshima	Yokohama
				Stadium: Nissan Stadium

17-18 April 30	Yokohama F. Marinos	–	Kashiwa Reysol	Yokohama
				Stadium: Nissan Stadium

24-25 March 31	FC Tokyo	–	Yokohama F. Marinos	Chōfu
				Stadium: Ajinomoto Stadium

29 April 32	Yokohama F. Marinos	–	Nagoya Grampus	Yokohama
				Stadium: Nissan Stadium

3-4 May 33	V-Varen Nagasaki	–	Yokohama F. Marinos	Nagasaki
				Stadium: Peace Stadium Connected by SoftBank

9 May 34	Yokohama F. Marinos	–	Gamba Osaka	Yokohama
				Stadium: Nissan Stadium

16 May 35	Kawasaki Frontale	–	Yokohama F. Marinos	Kawasaki
				Stadium: Kawasaki Todoroki Stadium

22-23 May 36	Yokohama F. Marinos	–	Shimizu S-Pulse	Yokohama
				Stadium: Nissan Stadium

29-30 May 37	Yokohama F. Marinos	–	JEF United Chiba	Yokohama
				Stadium: Nissan Stadium

6 June 38	Mito HollyHock	–	Yokohama F. Marinos	Mito
				Stadium: K's denki Stadium Mito

=== Emperor's Cup ===
26 August Rd 2	Yokohama F. Marinos	1–0	Fukushima United FC	Yokohama
	Kosei Suwama 35'	Report		Stadium: Nissan Stadium; Attendance: 7,327; Referee: Fu Ming (China)

7 October Rd 3	Yokohama F. Marinos	2–1	Kyoto Sangyo University	Yokohama
	Jordy Croux 61'; Jun Amano 68'	Report	Yuya Fukunaga 35' (yellow card) 28'; Narumu Ono (red card) 59'	Stadium: Nissan Stadium; Attendance: 5,107; Referee: Takahito Seta

9 December Rd of 16	Kawasaki Frontale	–	Yokohama F.Marinos	Kawasaki
				Stadium: Kawasaki Todoroki Stadium

=== J.League Cup ===
29 September Rd 2	Montedio Yamagata	1–2	Yokohama F. Marinos	Tendo
	Shummei Horikane 90+1'; Akira Silvano Disaro (yellow card) 12' (yellow-red card) 54'; Kiriya Sakamoto (yellow card) 45+2'; Hiroya Nodake (yellow card) 57'	Report	Rio Nitta 43'; Kosuke Matsumura 65'; Tomoki Kondo (yellow card) 60'; Takuto Kimura (yellow card) 73'	Stadium: ND Soft Stadium Yamagata; Attendance: 5,065; Referee: Hayato Shimizu

14 October Rd 3	Yokohama F. Marinos	2–1	Shimizu S-Pulse	Yokohama
	Kaina Tanimura 72'; Kei Chinen 81' (yellow card) 59'	Report	Tomoya Fujii 61'	Stadium: Nissan Stadium; Attendance: 8,879; Referee: Takafumi Mikuriya

28 October Rd 4	Yokohama F. Marinos	4–3	Sanfrecce Hiroshima	Yokohama
	Rio Nitta 53'; Kanata Hirano 59'; Rio Nitta 75'; Kim Ju-Sung 90+4' (o.g.); Yuta Tanaka (yellow card) 7'; Taisei Inoue (yellow card) 15'; Kanta Sekitomi (yellow card) 30'; Shin Midera (yellow card) 45'; Daiya Tono (yellow card) 78'; Tomoki Kondo (yellow card) 85'	Report	Hayato Araki 66'; Naoto Arai 74', 81'; Takuma Asano (yellow card) 50'	Stadium: NHK Spring Mitsuzawa Football Stadium; Attendance: 9,055; Referee: Akihiko Ikeuchi

11 November Prime Rd QF Leg 1	Yokohama F. Marinos	2–3	Kashima Antlers	Yokohama
	Rio Nitta 20'; Ryo Miyaichi 25' (red card) 31'; Tomoki Kondo (yellow card) 82'	Report	Yuma Suzuki 45+6', 82'; Gaku Shibasaki 65'; Léo Ceará (yellow card) 81'	Stadium: Nissan Stadium; Attendance: 11,593; Referee: Koei Koya

15 November Prime Rd QF Leg 2	Kashima Antlers	3–2	Yokohama F. Marinos	Kashima
	Yuta Matsumura 2'; Naomichi Ueda 56'; Rio Nitta 90+4'; Matheus Bueno (yellow card) 27'; Keisuke Tsukui (yellow card) 38'	Report	Jun Amano 47'; Rio Nitta 86'; Yuta Tanaka (yellow card) 28'; Kosei Suwana (yellow card) 40'	Stadium: Kashima Soccer Stadium; Attendance: 13,813; Referee: Jumpei Iida

Kashima Antlers won 6–4 on aggregate.

== Team statistics ==
=== Appearances and goals ===
As of 21 Nov 2026

No.	Pos.	Player	J1 League		Emperor's Cup		J.League Cup		Total	
No.	Pos.	Player	Apps	Goals	Apps	Goals	Apps	Goals	Apps	Goals
1	GK	(South Korea) Park Il-gyu	1	0	0	0	1	0	2	0
7	FW	(Japan) Daiya Tono	4+1	2	0+1	0	2+2	0	10	2
8	MF	(Japan) Takuya Kida	0+7	0	1+1	0	3+1	0	13	0
9	FW	(Japan) Kaina Tanimura	15	7	0+2	0	1+2	1	20	8
11	FW	(Belgium) Jordy Croux	2+8	1	1+1	1	1	0	13	2
13	DF	(Japan) Taisei Inoue	9+4	1	1+1	0	4+1	0	20	1
14	FW	(Japan) Kei Chinen	8+3	0	1	0	1	1	13	1
15	DF	(Japan) Taiki Watanabe	0	0	0	0	0	0	0	0
17	DF	(Colombia) Jeison Quiñónes	15	2	2	0	4	0	21	2
18	FW	(Japan) (Nigeria) George Onaiwu	0+4	0	0	0	3+1	1	8	1
19	FW	(Brazil) Tevis Gabriel	0+3	0	0	0	0+1	0	4	0
20	GK	(Japan) Yuya Tsuboi	0	0	0	0	0	0	0	0
21	GK	(Japan) Hiroki Iikura	10	0	1	0	4	0	15	0
22	DF	(Japan) Ryotaro Tsunoda	7+1	0	1	0	1+1	0	11	0
23	FW	(Japan) Ryo Miyaichi	9+4	2	2	0	2+1	1	18	3
24	FW	(Japan) Tomoki Kondo	13+4	2	1+1	0	2+2	0	23	2
25	MF	(Japan) Toichi Suzuki	7+4	0	0+2	0	1	0	14	0
26	FW	(Israel) Dean David	0+1	0	0	0	0+1	0	2	0
27	DF	(Japan) Ken Matsubara	0	0	0	0	0	0	0	0
28	MF	(Japan) Riku Yamane	8+3	1	2	0	2+1	0	16	1
30	FW	(Brazil) Yuri Araujo	0	0	0	0	0	0	0	0
32	MF	(Japan) Yuta Tanaka	1+1	1	0	0	2+1	0	5	1
33	DF	(Japan) Kosei Suwama	14	0	2	1	3+2	0	21	1
34	MF	(Japan) Takuto Kimura	7+2	0	1	0	2+2	0	14	0
35	DF	(Japan) Kanta Sekitomi	0+2	0	1	0	3	0	6	0
36	GK	(Spain) Ruben Blanco	4	0	1	0	0	0	5	0
40	MF	(Japan) Jun Amano	8+5	0	2	1	2+1	1	18	2
41	MF	(Japan) Kosuke Matsumura	15	0	0	0	2+2	1	19	1
43	FW	(Japan) Rio Nitta	2+8	2	2	0	4+1	4	16	6
44	DF	(Australia) (Kenya) Thomas Deng	0+1	0	0	0	1	0	2	0
46	FW	(Japan) Hiroto Asada	0	0	0	0	0	0	0	0
47	FW	(Japan) Shin Miidera	5+6	2	0+1	0	2+1	0	14	2
54	DF	(Japan) Shota Fujii	1	0	0	0	2+1	0	4	0
55	DF	(Japan) Kanata Hirano	0	0	0	0	0+1	1	1	0
