= Keita Ueda =

Japanese footballer

Keita Ueda 植田 啓太
Personal information
- Date of birth: 3 September 2002 (age 24)
- Place of birth: Kanagawa, Japan
- Height: 1.74 m (5 ft 9 in)
- Position: Defensive midfielder

Team information
- Current team: Kataller Toyama
- Number: 48

Youth career
- –2020: Yokohama F. Marinos

Senior career*
Years	Team	Apps	(Gls)
2021–2024	Yokohama F. Marinos	1	(0)
2021–2023	→ Tochigi SC (loan)	51	(3)
2024	→ SC Sagamihara (loan)	18	(2)
2025–	Kataller Toyama	29	(1)
- * Club domestic league appearances and goals as of 16 August 2026

Keita Ueda (植田 啓太, Ueda Keita; born 3 September 2002) is a Japanese footballer who plays as a defensive midfielder for J2 League club Kataller Toyama.

== Career statistics ==
=== Club ===
As of 4 March 2025.

Appearances and goals by club, season and competition
Club	Season	League			National Cup		League Cup		Total	
Club	Season	Division	Apps	Goals	Apps	Goals	Apps	Goals	Apps	Goals
Japan			League		Emperor's Cup		J. League Cup		Total	
Tochigi SC (loan)	2021	J2 League	7	0	2	0	–		9	0
Tochigi SC (loan)	2022	J2 League	25	3	2	0	–		27	3
Tochigi SC (loan)	2023	J2 League	12	0	3	0	–		15	0
Tochigi SC (loan)	Total		44	3	7	0	0	0	51	3
Yokohama F. Marinos	2024	J1 League	0	0	1	0	0	0	1	0
SC Sagamihara (loan)	2024	J3 League	18	2	0	0	0	0	18	2
Kataller Toyama	2025	J2 League	2	0	0	0	0	0	2	0
Career total			64	5	8	0	0	0	72	5

== Honours ==
Japan U16

- AFC U-16 Championship: 2018
