= Takuto Minami =

Japanese footballer

Personal information
- Date of birth: 9 May 2002 (age 24)
- Place of birth: Nabari, Mie, Japan
- Height: 1.75 m (5 ft 9 in)
- Positions: Winger; right back

Team information
- Current team: Reilac Shiga FC
- Number: 35

Youth career
- –2017: FC Familia
- 2018–2020: Kokoku High School

Senior career*
Years	Team	Apps	(Gls)
2021–2024	Yokohama F. Marinos	3	(0)
2022–2024	→ Iwate Grulla Morioka (on loan)	35	(0)
2024-	Reilac Shiga FC	29	(2)
- * Club domestic league appearances and goals as of 23 August 2026

Takuto Minami (南 拓都, Minami Takuto; born 9 May 2002) is a Japanese footballer currently playing as a winger or a right back for Reilac Shiga FC.

== Career statistics ==
=== Club ===
As of 25 June 2022.

Club	Season	League			National Cup		League Cup		Other		Total	
Club	Season	Division	Apps	Goals	Apps	Goals	Apps	Goals	Apps	Goals	Apps	Goals
Yokohama F. Marinos	2021	J1 League	0	0	0	0	3 (Note: Appearances in the J.League Cup)	0	0	0	3	0
Iwate Grulla Morioka (on loan)	2022	J2 League	6	0	2	0	−		0	0	8	0
Career total			6	0	2	0	3	0	0	0	11	0
