= Tōichi Suzuki =

Japanese association football player

Tōichi Suzuki 鈴木 冬一
Personal information
- Full name: Tōichi Suzuki
- Date of birth: 30 May 2000 (age 26)
- Place of birth: Higashiōsaka, Japan
- Height: 1.63 m (5 ft 4 in)
- Position: Left midfielder

Team information
- Current team: Yokohama F. Marinos
- Number: 25

Youth career
- 2010–2017: Cerezo Osaka
- 2018: Nagasaki IAS High School

Senior career*
Years	Team	Apps	(Gls)
2017	Cerezo Osaka U-23	3	(0)
2019–2020	Shonan Bellmare	36	(1)
2021–2023	Lausanne Sport	82	(6)
2024	Kyoto Sanga	15	(0)
2025–	Yokohama F. Marinos	23	(0)

International career
2015	Japan U15	10	(1)
2016	Japan U16	14	(4)
2017	Japan U17	10	(1)
2018	Japan U18	3	(0)
2019	Japan U20	6	(0)
2019–	Japan U23	1	(0)
- * Club domestic league appearances and goals as of 11 August 2026

Tōichi Suzuki (鈴木 冬一, Suzuki Tōichi; born 30 May 2000) is a Japanese professional footballer who plays as a left midfielder for J1 League club Yokohama F. Marinos.

== Club career ==
=== Early career ===
After playing in the youth teams of Cerezo Osaka, he joined the reserve club playing in J3 League. He made 3 appearances throughout the season 2017 as a substitute and played 11 minutes. He joined the Nagasaki Institute of Applied Science in March 2018.

=== Shonan Bellmare ===
Following the end of the 2018 season, J1 League side Shonan Bellmare signed Suzuki for the upcoming campaign. He made his debut for the club on March 6 in a J.League Cup group stage match against V-Varen Nagasaki. 3 days later, he made his J1 debut in a 1-0 loss against Kashima Antlers. Suzuki scored his first professional goal in the away J.League Cup match against V-Varen Nagasaki in a 1-0 win.

=== Lausanne-Sport ===
On 13 January 2021, Suzuku joined Swiss Super League club FC Lausanne-Sport on a permanent deal.

=== Kyoto Sanga ===
On 28 December 2023, it was announced that Suzuki would join J1 League club Kyoto Sanga on a permanent deal, starting from the 2024 season.

=== Yokohama F. Marinos ===
After one season with Kyoto Sanga, it was announced in December 2024 that Suzuki would be joining Yokohama F. Marinos for the 2025 season.
