= Eduardo (footballer, born 1993) =

Brazilian footballer

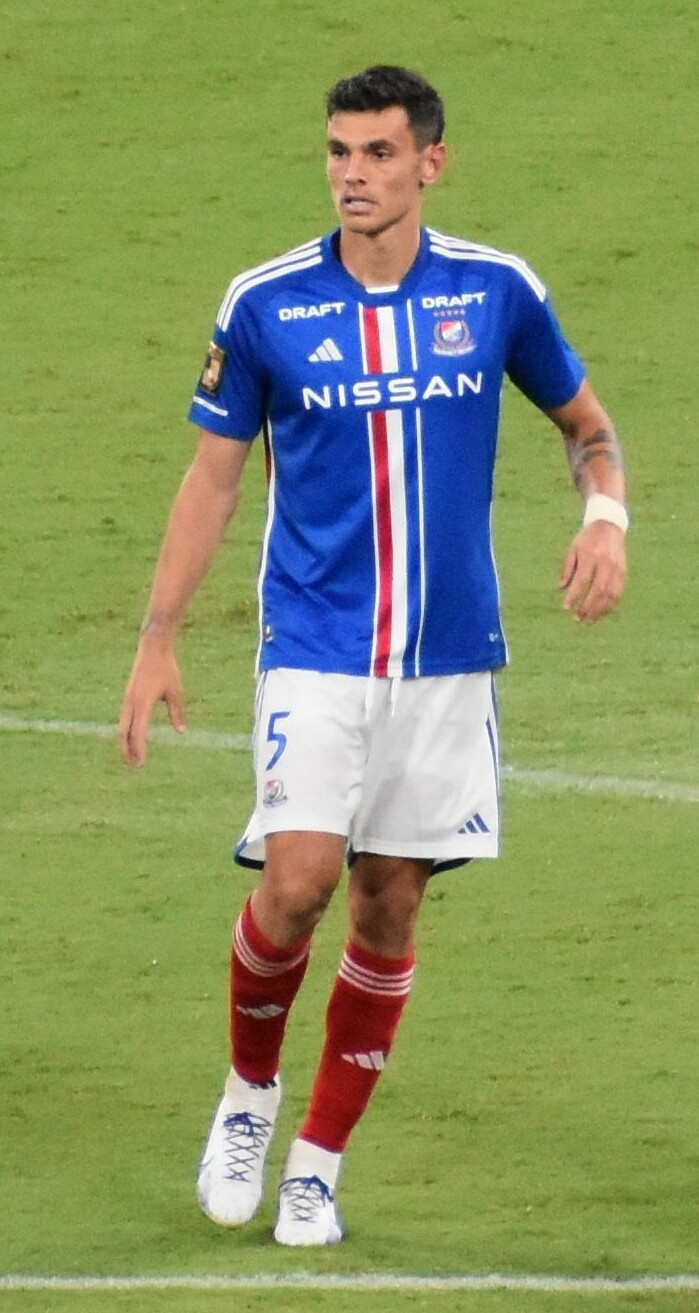

Personal information
- Full name: Carlos Eduardo Bendini Giusti
- Date of birth: 27 April 1993 (age 33)
- Place of birth: São Paulo, Brazil
- Height: 1.86 m (6 ft 1 in)
- Position: Centre back

Team information
- Current team: V-Varen Nagasaki
- Number: 4

Senior career*
Years	Team	Apps	(Gls)
2011–2016	Metropolitano	7	(0)
2012	→ FC Lustenau 07 (loan)	12	(2)
2013	→ Austria Lustenau (loan)	10	(0)
2013	→ Gainare Tottori (loan)	15	(2)
2014	→ Tochigi SC (loan)	19	(2)
2014–2016	→ Kashiwa Reysol (loan)	35	(3)
2016	→ Kawasaki Frontale (loan)	25	(0)
2017–2018	Kawasaki Frontale	17	(1)
2019	Matsumoto Yamaga	7	(0)
2020–2021	Sagan Tosu	57	(3)
2022–2024	Yokohama F. Marinos	77	(3)
2025–	V-Varen Nagasaki	26	(2)

International career
2014	Brazil U-23	1	(0)
- * Club domestic league appearances and goals as of 11 August 2026

Carlos Eduardo Bendini Giusti (born 27 April 1993), simply known as Eduardo (エドゥアルド) or formerly Dudu is a Brazilian professional footballer who plays as a centre back and currently play for V-Varen Nagasaki in J2 League.

== Club career ==
Dudu kicked off his career with Metropolitano in 2011. In 2012, he was loaned out to Austrian club FC Lustenau 07. During the loan spell, he played 12 matches and scored 2 goals. After the stint, he was loaned to archrivals Austria Lustenau. In July 2013, he joined Gainare Tottori of J2 League again on loan.

In 2014, Eduardo again joined a Japanese side on loan, this time with Tochigi. After the spell ended, on the deadline day of the summer transfer window, he was signed by J1 League side Kashiwa Reysol on loan.

On 8 January 2025, Eduardo announce official transfer to J2 club, V-Varen Nagasaki for 2025 season.

== Career statistics ==
=== Club ===
As of the start from 2025 season.

Appearances and goals by club, season and competition
Club	Season	League			Cup		League Cup		Continental		Other		Total	
Club	Season	Division	Apps	Goals	Apps	Goals	Apps	Goals	Apps	Goals	Apps	Goals	Apps	Goals
Metropolitano	2011	Série D	1	0	3	0	–		–		–		4	0
Metropolitano	2012	Série D	–		3	0	–		–		–		3	0
Metropolitano	Total		1	0	6	0	–		–		–		7	0
FC Lustenau 07 (loan)	2012–13	Austrian Football First League	12	2	2	0	–		–		–		14	2
Austria Lustenau (loan)	2012–13	Austrian Football First League	10	0	–		–		–		–		10	0
Gainare Tottori (loan)	2013	J.League Div 2	15	2	0	0	–		–		–		15	2
Tochigi SC (loan)	2014	J.League Div 2	19	2	0	0	–		–		–		19	2
Kashiwa Reysol (loan)	2014	J.League Div 1	6	1	0	0	3	1	–		–		9	2
Kashiwa Reysol (loan)	2015	J1 League	29	2	3	0	1	0	9	1	–		42	3
Kashiwa Reysol (loan)	Total		91	9	5	0	4	1	9	1	–		109	11
Kawasaki Frontale (loan)	2016	J1 League	25	0	5	2	5	0	–		1	0	36	2
Kawasaki Frontale	2017	J1 League	14	0	2	1	3	0	1	0	–		20	1
Kawasaki Frontale	2018	J1 League	3	1	1	0	0	0	3	0	0	0	7	1
Kawasaki Frontale	Total		42	1	8	3	8	0	4	0	1	0	63	4
Matsumoto Yamaga	2019	J1 League	7	0	0	0	4	1	–		–		13	1
Sagan Tosu	2020	J1 League	21	0	–		1	0	–		–		22	0
Sagan Tosu	2021	J1 League	36	3	3	0	0	0	–		–		39	3
Sagan Tosu	Total		57	3	3	0	5	1	–		–		61	4
Yokohama F. Marinos	2022	J1 League	23	1	1	0	0	0	2	0	–		26	1
Yokohama F. Marinos	2023	J1 League	26	0	1	1	7	0	10	0	0	0	44	1
Yokohama F. Marinos	2024	J1 League	28	2	3	0	1	0	0	0	0	0	32	2
Yokohama F. Marinos	Total		77	3	5	1	8	0	12	0	0	0	102	4
V-Varen Nagasaki	2025	J2 League	0	0	0	0	0	0	–				0	0
V-Varen Nagasaki	Total		0	0	0	0	0	0	–				0	0
Career Total			275	16	27	4	25	2	25	1	1	0	353	23

^{1}Includes J. League Championship.

== Honours ==
=== Club ===
Kawasaki Frontale

- J1 League: 2017, 2018

Yokohama F. Marinos

- J1 League: 2022
