= Takumi Kamijima =

Japanese footballer (born 1997)

Takumi Kamijima 上島 拓巳
Personal information
- Date of birth: 5 February 1997 (age 29)
- Place of birth: Chiba, Japan
- Height: 1.86 m (6 ft 1 in)
- Position: Centre-back

Team information
- Current team: Avispa Fukuoka
- Number: 5

Youth career
- 2002–2004: Yukarigaoka FC
- 2005–2014: Kashiwa Reysol

College career
Years	Team	Apps	(Gls)
2016–2018	Chuo University		

Senior career*
Years	Team	Apps	(Gls)
2018–2022	Kashiwa Reysol	56	(0)
2020	→ Avispa Fukuoka (loan)	41	(2)
2023–2024	Yokohama F. Marinos	47	(0)
2025–	Avispa Fukuoka	39	(1)
- * Club domestic league appearances and goals as of 12 August 2026

Takumi Kamijima (上島 拓巳, Kamijima Takumi; born 5 February 1997) is a Japanese professional footballer who plays as a centre-back for J1 League club Avispa Fukuoka.

== Career ==
During his time at Kashiwa Reysol U18s, Kamijima played with Yūta Nakayama. He started his professional career as a specially designated player for Kashiwa Reysol, from Chuo University in the 2018 J1 League season. Kamijima joined the team fully from the 2019 season.

At the end of his first full season at Kashiwa where he made 14 appearances across all competitions, Kamijima joined Avispa Fukuoka on loan for the 2020 season. He was named as the Meiji Yasuda J.League KONAMI Monthly MVP award winner for September 2020. He went on to make 41 appearances and he scored his first professional goal in a 1–0 league victory over Tokushima Vortis.

Kamijima returned to Kashiwa where he played for two more seasons in the J1 League, making a further 57 appearances for the club.

On 14 December 2022, it was announced Kamijima would be moving to J1 League champions Yokohama F. Marinos for the 2023 season. On 5 January 2024, Kamijima's contract was extended for the 2024 season.

On 12 December 2024, Kamijima was announced at Avispa Fukuoka.

== Career statistics ==
As of end of the 2024 season.

Appearances and goals by club, season and competition
Club	Season	League			Emperor's Cup		J.League Cup		Other		Total	
Club	Season	Division	Apps	Goals	Apps	Goals	Apps	Goals	Apps	Goals	Apps	Goals
Kashiwa Reysol	2018	J1 League	0	0	0	0	0	0	–		0	0
Kashiwa Reysol	2019	J2 League	10	0	0	0	4	0	–		14	0
Kashiwa Reysol	2021	J1 League	22	0	0	0	5	0	–		27	0
Kashiwa Reysol	2022	J1 League	24	0	2	0	4	0	–		30	0
Kashiwa Reysol	Total		56	0	2	0	13	0	0	0	71	0
Avispa Fukuoka (loan)	2020	J2 League	41	2	0	0	–		–		41	2
Yokohama F. Marinos	2023	J1 League	21	0	1	0	8	0	5 (Note: Four appearances in AFC Champions League; one appearance in Japanese Super Cup)	0	39	0
Yokohama F. Marinos	2024	J1 League	26	0	4	0	4	0	13 (Note: Appearances in AFC Champions League)	0	47	0
Yokohama F. Marinos	Total		47	0	5	0	12	0	18	0	86	0
Career total			144	2	7	0	25	0	18	0	198	2
