= Tomoki Kondo =

Japanese footballer

Tomoki Kondo 近藤 友喜
Personal information
- Date of birth: 21 March 2001 (age 25)
- Place of birth: Aichi, Japan
- Height: 1.72 m (5 ft 8 in)
- Position: Midfielder

Team information
- Current team: Yokohama F. Marinos
- Number: 24

Youth career
- 2007–2015: Nagoya Grampus
- 2016–2018: Maebashi Ikuei High School

College career
Years	Team	Apps	(Gls)
2019–2022	Nihon University		

Senior career*
Years	Team	Apps	(Gls)
2021–2023	Yokohama FC	41	(2)
2024–2025	Hokkaido Consadole Sapporo	61	(10)
2026–	Yokohama F. Marinos	18	(1)
- * Club domestic league appearances and goals as of 11 August 2026

Tomoki Kondo (近藤 友喜, Kondo Tomoki; born 21 March 2001) is a Japanese footballer currently playing as a midfielder for J1 League club Yokohama F. Marinos.

== Career ==
=== Yokohama FC ===
In June 2021, it was announced that Kondo would be joining Yokohama FC for the 2023 season. He was approved as a designated special player and made his J.League debut in a 5–0 defeat to Vissel Kobe. Kondo played as a designated special player for both the 2021 and 2022 seasons for Yokohama FC, before making 33 appearances and scoring 2 goals in his first professional season in 2023.

=== Hokkaido Consadole Sapporo ===
At the end of the 2023 season following the relegation of Yokohama FC, Kondo transferred to J1 League club Hokkaido Consadole Sapporo. He made his debut in a 0–0 league draw with Avispa Fukuoka and went on to make 30 appearances across all competitions, scoring 5 goals. Unfortunately, Hokkaido Consadole Sapporo were relegated at the end of the 2024 season, meaning back-to-back relegations for Kondo.

=== Yokohama F. Marinos ===
Ahead of the J1 100 Year Vision League, Kondo signed for Yokohama F. Marinos.

== Career statistics ==
=== Club ===
As of 22 March 2026.

Appearances and goals by club, season and competition
Club	Season	League			National cup (Note: Includes Emperors Cup)		League cup (Note: Includes J.League Cup)		Total	
Club	Season	Division	Apps	Goals	Apps	Goals	Apps	Goals	Apps	Goals
Yokohama FC	2021	J1 League	2	0	0	0	0	0	2	0
Yokohama FC	2022	J2 League	9	0	0	0	0	0	9	0
Yokohama FC	2023	J1 League	30	2	1	0	2	0	33	2
Yokohama FC	Total		41	2	1	0	2	0	44	2
Hokkaido Consadole Sapporo	2024	J1 League	29	5	–		1	0	30	5
Hokkaido Consadole Sapporo	2025	J2 League	32	5	–		0	0	32	5
Hokkaido Consadole Sapporo	Total		61	10	0	0	1	0	62	10
Yokohama F. Marinos	2026	J1 (100)	5	0	–		–		5	0
Career total			107	12	1	0	3	0	111	12
