= Yuri Araújo =

Brazilian footballer

Personal information
- Full name: Yuri Nascimento de Araujo
- Date of birth: 13 April 1996 (age 30)
- Place of birth: São Paulo, Brazil
- Height: 1.70 m (5 ft 7 in)
- Position: Winger

Team information
- Current team: Yokohama F. Marinos
- Number: 30

Youth career
- 2012–2013: Atlético Sorocaba

Senior career*
Years	Team	Apps	(Gls)
2014–2015	Lusitano	3	(0)
2015–2018	Académico de Viseu	67	(4)
2018–2020	Penafiel	36	(2)
2020–2025	Académico de Viseu	91	(15)
2025–	Yokohama F. Marinos	22	(3)
- * Club domestic league appearances and goals as of 11 August 2026

Yuri Nascimento de Araujo (born 13 April 1996), known as Yuri Araújo, is a Brazilian professional footballer who plays as a winger for Japanese J1 League club Yokohama F. Marinos.

== Career ==
Yuri Araújo joined Académico de Viseu from Lusitano FCV in 2015, and stayed with the club for ten years except for a stint with Penafiel. Yuri made his professional debut in the Segunda Liga for Académico de Viseu on 30 August 2015 in a game against Oriental. During the 2024–25 campaign, he achieved his personal highest goalscoring tally during one season. He left Viseu in 2025 for a career in the J.League.
