= Asahi Uenaka =

Japanese footballer (born 2001)

Asahi Uenaka 植中 朝日
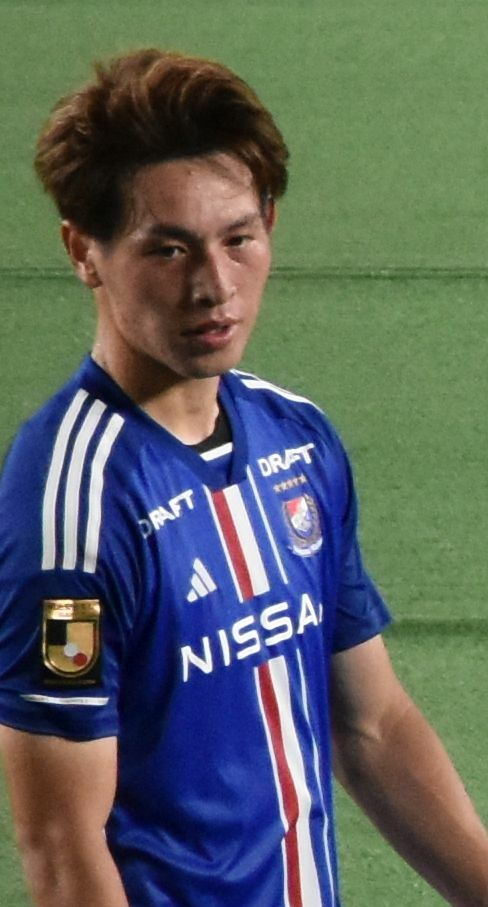
- Uenaka with Yokohama F. Marinos in 2023

Personal information
- Date of birth: 1 November 2001 (age 25)
- Place of birth: Fukuoka, Japan
- Height: 1.79 m (5 ft 10 in)
- Position: Forward

Team information
- Current team: Gamba Osaka
- Number: 14

Youth career
- 2008–2013: Kokura Minami FC
- 2014–2019: JFA Academy Fukushima

Senior career*
Years	Team	Apps	(Gls)
2020–2022	V-Varen Nagasaki	49	(15)
2023–2025	Yokohama F. Marinos	76	(14)
2026–	Gamba Osaka	0	(0)
- * Club domestic league appearances and goals as of 10:46, 23 March 2026 (UTC)

Asahi Uenaka (植中 朝日, Uenaka Asahi; born 1 November 2001) is a Japanese professional footballer who plays as a forward for J1 League club Gamba Osaka.

== Career statistics ==
=== Club ===
As of 23 March 2026.

Appearances and goals by club, season and competition
Club	Season	League			National cup (Note: Includes Emperors Cup)		League cup (Note: Includes J.League Cup)		Continental		Other		Total	
Club	Season	Division	Apps	Goals	Apps	Goals	Apps	Goals	Apps	Goals	Apps	Goals	Apps	Goals
V-Varen Nagasaki	2020	J2 League	2	0	0	0	–		–		–		2	0
V-Varen Nagasaki	2021	J2 League	19	10	3	1	–		–		–		22	11
V-Varen Nagasaki	2022	J2 League	28	5	1	0	–		–		–		29	5
V-Varen Nagasaki	Total		49	15	4	1	0	0	0	0	0	0	53	16
Yokohama F. Marinos	2023	J1 League	9	3	2	0	8	4	5 (Note: Appearances in AFC Champions League Elite)	0	1 (Note: Appearance in Japanese Super Cup)	0	25	7
Yokohama F. Marinos	2024	J1 League	34	3	4	3	4	3	13	4	0	0	55	13
Yokohama F. Marinos	2025	J1 League	33	8	0	0	2	1	5	1	0	0	40	10
Yokohama F. Marinos	Total		76	14	6	3	14	8	23	5	1	0	120	30
Career total			125	29	10	4	14	8	23	5	1	0	173	46
