= Taiki Watanabe =

Japanese footballer (born 1999)

Taiki Watanabe 渡邊 泰基
Personal information
- Full name: Taiki Watanabe
- Date of birth: 22 April 1999 (age 27)
- Place of birth: Niigata, Japan
- Height: 1.80 m (5 ft 11 in)
- Position: Left-back

Team information
- Current team: Yokohama F. Marinos
- Number: 39

Youth career
- 2009–2014: Albirex Niigata
- 2015–2017: Maebashi Ikuei High School

Senior career*
Years	Team	Apps	(Gls)
2018–2023	Albirex Niigata	64	(2)
2018–2020	→ Zweigen Kanazawa (loan)	64	(2)
2024–	Yokohama F. Marinos	29	(0)
- * Club domestic league appearances and goals as of 16 September 2025

Taiki Watanabe (渡邊 泰基, Watanabe Taiki; born 22 April 1999) is a Japanese professional footballer who plays as a left-back for J1 League club Yokohama F. Marinos.

== Club career ==
After attending Maebashi Ikuei High School, Taiki Watanabe joined back with Albirex Niigata for the 2018 season, debuting in a J. League Cup match against FC Tokyo.

Watanabe spent two years at Niigata before moving on loan to Zweigen Kanazawa mid-way through the 2020 season. After making 27 appearances for Zweigen Kanazawa in the second half of the season, his loan was extended for the whole of the 2021 season.

Watanabe scored his first professional goal in a 2-3 league defeat to Mito HollyHock in May 2021.

Watanabe returned to Albirex Niigata for the 2022 season, although he only played a handful of games in the season they were promoted to the J1 League. He made his J1 League debut in March 2023, in a 2–2 draw with Hokkaido Consadole Sapporo and went on to make 27 appearances across all competitions in the 2023 season.

In December 2023, it was announced that Watanabe would be joining Yokohama F. Marinos.

== Club statistics ==
As of 3 December 2023.

Appearances and goals by club, season and competition
Club	Season	League			National Cup		League Cup		Total	
Club	Season	Division	Apps	Goals	Apps	Goals	Apps	Goals	Apps	Goals
Japan			League		Emperor's Cup		J. League Cup		Total	
Albirex Niigata	2018	J2 League	21	0	1	0	5	0	27	0
Albirex Niigata	2019	J2 League	16	0	1	0	–		17	0
Albirex Niigata	2022	J2 League	6	0	1	0	–		7	0
Albirex Niigata	2023	J1 League	21	2	2	0	4	0	27	2
Albirex Niigata	Total		64	2	5	0	9	0	78	2
Zweigen Kanazawa (loan)	2020	J2 League	27	0	0	0	–		27	0
Zweigen Kanazawa (loan)	2021	J2 League	37	2	0	0	–		37	2
Zweigen Kanazawa (loan)	Total		64	2	0	0	0	0	64	2
Yokohama F. Marinos	2024	J1 League	0	0	0	0	0	0	0	0
Career total			128	4	5	0	9	0	142	4
