= Riku Yamane =

Japanese footballer

Riku Yamane 山根 陸
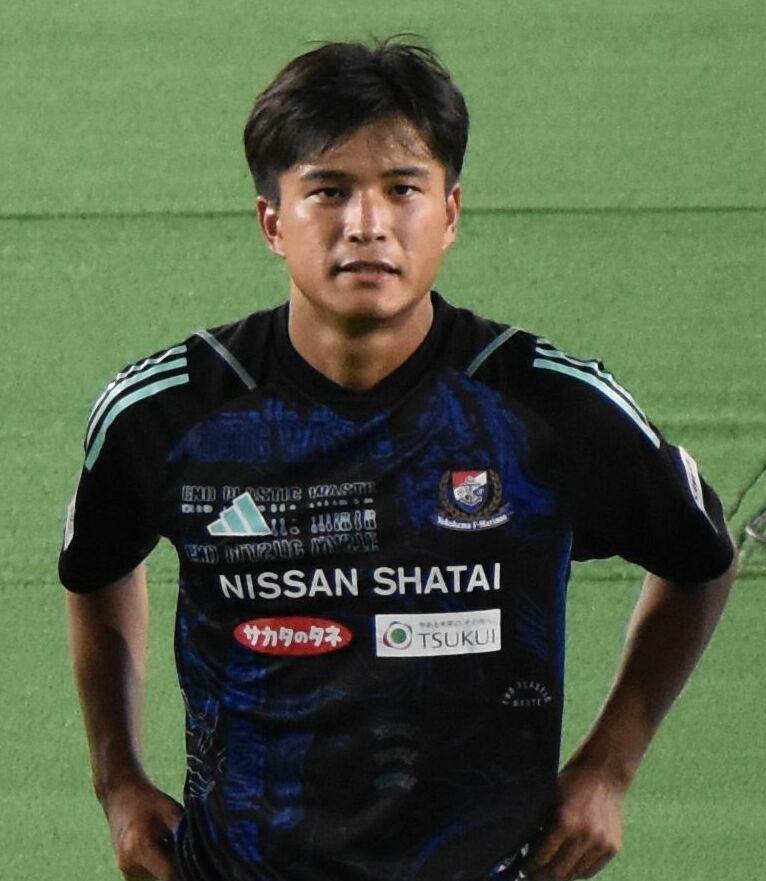

Personal information
- Full name: Riku Yamane
- Date of birth: 17 August 2003 (age 23)
- Place of birth: Kanagawa, Japan
- Height: 1.73 m (5 ft 8 in)
- Position: Midfielder

Team information
- Current team: Yokohama F. Marinos
- Number: 28

Youth career
- 2008–2009: Tsudayama FC
- 2010–2022: Yokohama F. Marinos

Senior career*
Years	Team	Apps	(Gls)
2022–	Yokohama F. Marinos	109	(3)

International career
2018–2019	Japan U16	5	(0)
2022	Japan U19	4	(0)
2023–	Japan U20	3	(1)
- * Club domestic league appearances and goals as of 11 August 2026

Riku Yamane (山根 陸, Yamane Riku; born 17 August 2003) is a Japanese footballer currently playing as a midfielder for Yokohama F. Marinos and the Japan national under-20 football team.

== Career ==
On 6 November 2020, Yamane was registered to the first team as a type 2 player. On 17 October 2021, he was promoted to the first team from the 2022 season. Yokohama F. Marinos would go on to win the 2022 J1 League.

== International career ==
Yamane was called up to the Japan U-20 squad for the 2023 FIFA U-20 World Cup.

== Career statistics ==
=== Club ===
As of 23 February 2022.

Club	Season	League			National Cup		League Cup		Other		Total	
Club	Season	Division	Apps	Goals	Apps	Goals	Apps	Goals	Apps	Goals	Apps	Goals
Yokohama F. Marinos	2022	J1 League	1	0	0	0	0	0	0	0	1	0
Career total			1	0	0	0	0	0	0	0	1	0

== Honours ==
=== Club ===
Yokohama F. Marinos

- J1 League: 2022
