= Kōta Watanabe (footballer) =

Japanese footballer (born 1998)

Kōta Watanabe 渡辺 皓太
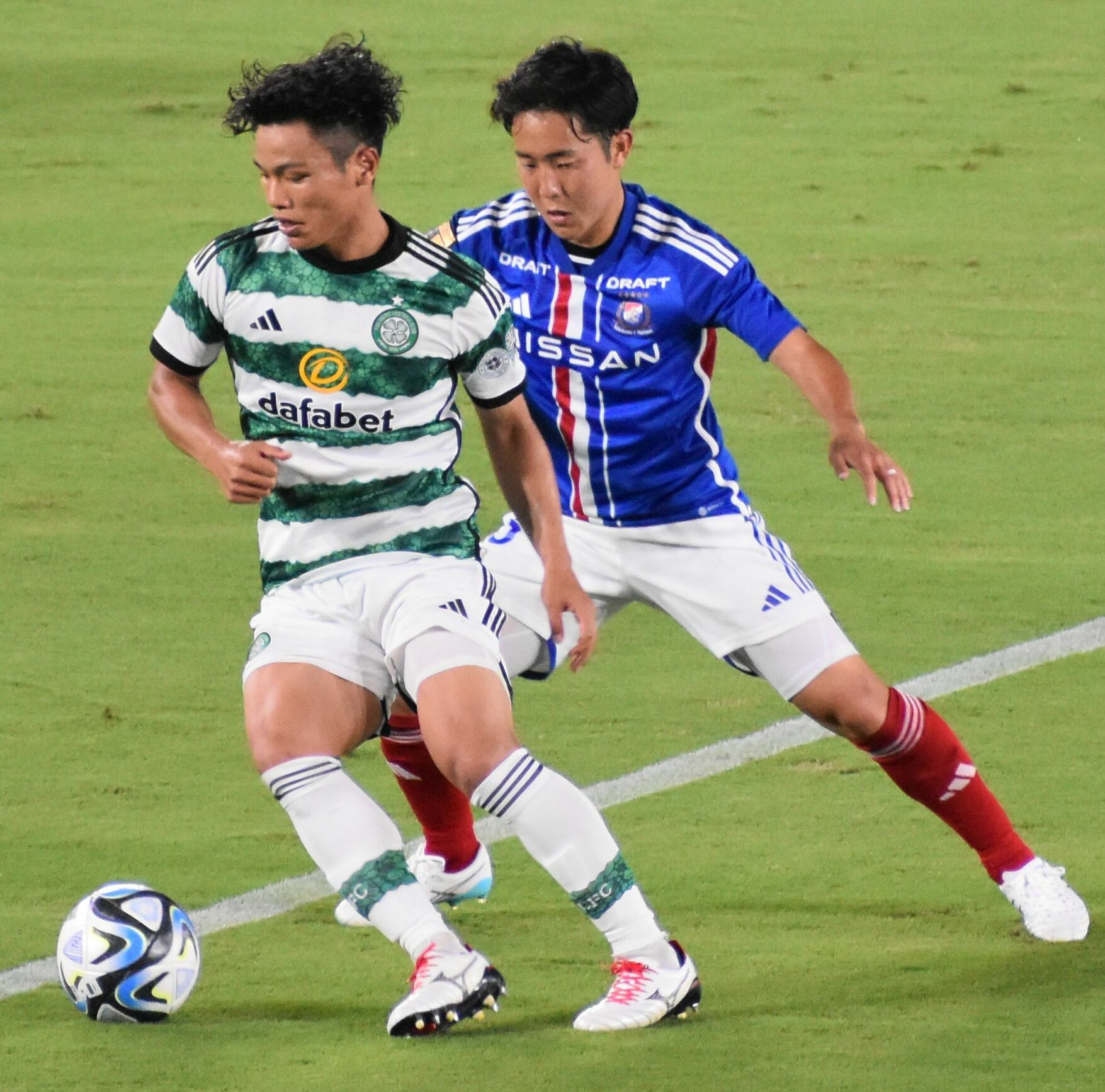
- Watanabe about to tackle Reo Hatate during a friendly match between Celtic and Yokohama F. Marinos.

Personal information
- Full name: Kōta Watanabe
- Date of birth: October 18, 1998 (age 28)
- Place of birth: Kawasaki, Kanagawa, Japan
- Height: 1.66 m (5 ft 5 1/2 in)
- Position: Midfielder

Team information
- Current team: Vissel Kobe
- Number: 20

Youth career
- 2005–2007: FF Vigore
- 2008–2016: Tokyo Verdy

Senior career*
Years	Team	Apps	(Gls)
2016–2019	Tokyo Verdy	90	(4)
2019–2026	Yokohama F. Marinos	190	(6)
2026–	Vissel Kobe	1	(0)

International career
2018	Japan U23	7	(0)
Medal record
Representing Japan
Asian Games
Silver medal – second place	2018 Jakarta-Palembang	Team
- * Club domestic league appearances and goals as of 10 August 2026

Kōta Watanabe (渡辺 皓太, Watanabe Kōta; born October 18, 1998) is a Japanese footballer who plays for J1 League club Vissel Kobe.

== Career ==
Kōta Watanabe joined J2 League club Tokyo Verdy in 2016.

== International career ==
On May 24, 2019, Watanabe has been called by Japan's head coach Hajime Moriyasu to feature in the Copa América played in Brazil. He's the only J2 League player to be called up for this competition.

== Club statistics ==
As of 4 October 2026.

Appearances and goals by club, season and competition
Club	Season	League			National cup (Note: Includes Emperor's Cup)		League cup (Note: Includes J.League Cup)		Continental		Other		Total	
Club	Season	Division	Apps	Goals	Apps	Goals	Apps	Goals	Apps	Goals	Apps	Goals	Apps	Goals
Tokyo Verdy	2016	J2 League	11	0	1	0	–		–		0	0	12	0
Tokyo Verdy	2017	J2 League	27	1	0	0	–		–		1 (Note: Appearance in J1/J2 play-offs)	0	28	1
Tokyo Verdy	2018	J2 League	36	2	0	0	–		–		3	0	39	2
Tokyo Verdy	2019	J2 League	16	1	0	0	–		–		0	0	16	1
Tokyo Verdy	Total		90	4	1	0	0	0	0	0	4	0	95	4
Yokohama F. Marinos	2019	J1 League	9	0	2	0	0	0	0	0	0	0	11	0
Yokohama F. Marinos	2020	J1 League	19	2	0	0	1	0	2 (Note: Appearances in AFC Champions League Elite)	0	0	0	22	2
Yokohama F. Marinos	2021	J1 League	26	0	0	0	7	0	0	0	0	0	33	0
Yokohama F. Marinos	2022	J1 League	24	0	2	0	2	0	3	0	0	0	31	0
Yokohama F. Marinos	2023	J1 League	34	2	0	0	7	0	12	2	1 (Note: Appearance in Japanese Super Cup)	0	54	4
Yokohama F. Marinos	2024	J1 League	30	1	2	0	3	0	8	2	0	0	43	3
Yokohama F. Marinos	2025	J1 League	31	0	1	0	2	0	0	0	0	0	34	0
Yokohama F. Marinos	2026	J1 (100)	17	1	–		–		0	0	0	0	17	1
Yokohama F. Marinos	Total		190	6	7	0	22	0	25	4	1	0	245	10
Vissel Kobe	2026–27	J1 League	1	0	2	0	–		0	0	–		3	0
Career total			281	10	10	0	22	0	25	4	5	0	343	14

== Honours ==
Yokohama F. Marinos

- J1 League: 2019, 2022
