= Takuya Kida =

Japanese footballer

Takuya Kida 喜田 拓也
Personal information
- Date of birth: 23 August 1994 (age 32)
- Place of birth: Kanagawa, Japan
- Height: 1.70 m (5 ft 7 in)
- Position: Defensive midfielder

Team information
- Current team: Yokohama F. Marinos
- Number: 8

Youth career
- 2001–2005: Kitakata FC
- 2006–2012: Yokohama F. Marinos

Senior career*
Years	Team	Apps	(Gls)
2012–	Yokohama F. Marinos	301	(5)
2014–2015	→ J.League U-22 Selection	10	(1)

International career
2011	Japan U-17	4	(0)
2014	Japan U-23	2	(0)
Medal record
Yokohama F. Marinos
Runner-up	J1 League	2013
Runner-up	J.League Cup	2018
Winner	Emperor's Cup	2013
Runner-up	Emperor's Cup	2017
- * Club domestic league appearances and goals as of 11 August 2026

Takuya Kida (喜田 拓也, born 23 August 1994 in Kanagawa, Japan) is a Japanese football player who has played defensive midfield for Yokohama F. Marinos in the J1 League since 2012. He also played for Japan in the 2011 FIFA U-17 World Cup in their run to the quarterfinals, and participated in the 2014 Asian Games where they lost 1-0 to South Korea in the quarterfinals.

== Club career statistics ==
As of 25 May 2024

Club performance			League		Cup		League Cup		Continental		Other		Total	
Season	Club	League	Apps	Goals	Apps	Goals	Apps	Goals	Apps	Goals	Apps	Goals	Apps	Goals
League					Emperor's Cup		J. League Cup		ACL		Other		Total	
2012	Yokohama F. Marinos	J1 League	0	0	0	0	2	0	-		-		2	0
2013	Yokohama F. Marinos	J1 League	0	0	0	0	0	0	-		-		0	0
2014	Yokohama F. Marinos	J1 League	2	0	2	0	1	0	-		-		5	0
2015	Yokohama F. Marinos	J1 League	24	0	2	0	1	0	-		-		27	0
2016	Yokohama F. Marinos	J1 League	27	1	2	0	4	0	-		-		33	1
2017	Yokohama F. Marinos	J1 League	23	0	3	1	0	0	-		-		26	1
2018	Yokohama F. Marinos	J1 League	22	1	2	1	5	0	-		-		29	2
2019	Yokohama F. Marinos	J1 League	33	0	1	0	1	0	-		-		35	0
2020	Yokohama F. Marinos	J1 League	30	0	-		2	0	7	0	1	0	40	0
2021	Yokohama F. Marinos	J1 League	29	0	0	0	1	0	-		-		30	0
2022	Yokohama F. Marinos	J1 League	23	0	0	0	0	0	7	0	-		30	0
2023	Yokohama F. Marinos	J1 League	29	1	1	0	7	0	5	0	1	0	43	1
2024	Yokohama F. Marinos	J1 League	10	0	0	0	0	0	5	0	-		15	0
Total			252	3	13	2	24	0	24	0	2	0	315	5

== FIFA U-17 World Cup statistics ==
Club performance			Tournament	
Season	Club	League	Apps	Goals
Tournament
2011	Japan	2011 FIFA U-17 World Cup	4	0
Total			4	0

== Asian Games statistics ==
Club performance			Tournament	
Season	Club	League	Apps	Goals
Tournament
2014	Japan	2014 Asian Games	2	0
Total			1	0

== Honours ==
=== Club ===
Yokohama F. Marinos

- Emperor's Cup: 2013
- J1 League: 2019, 2022

=== Individual ===
- J.League Best XI: 2019
