= Ken Matsubara =

Japanese footballer (born 1993)

Ken Matsubara 松原 健
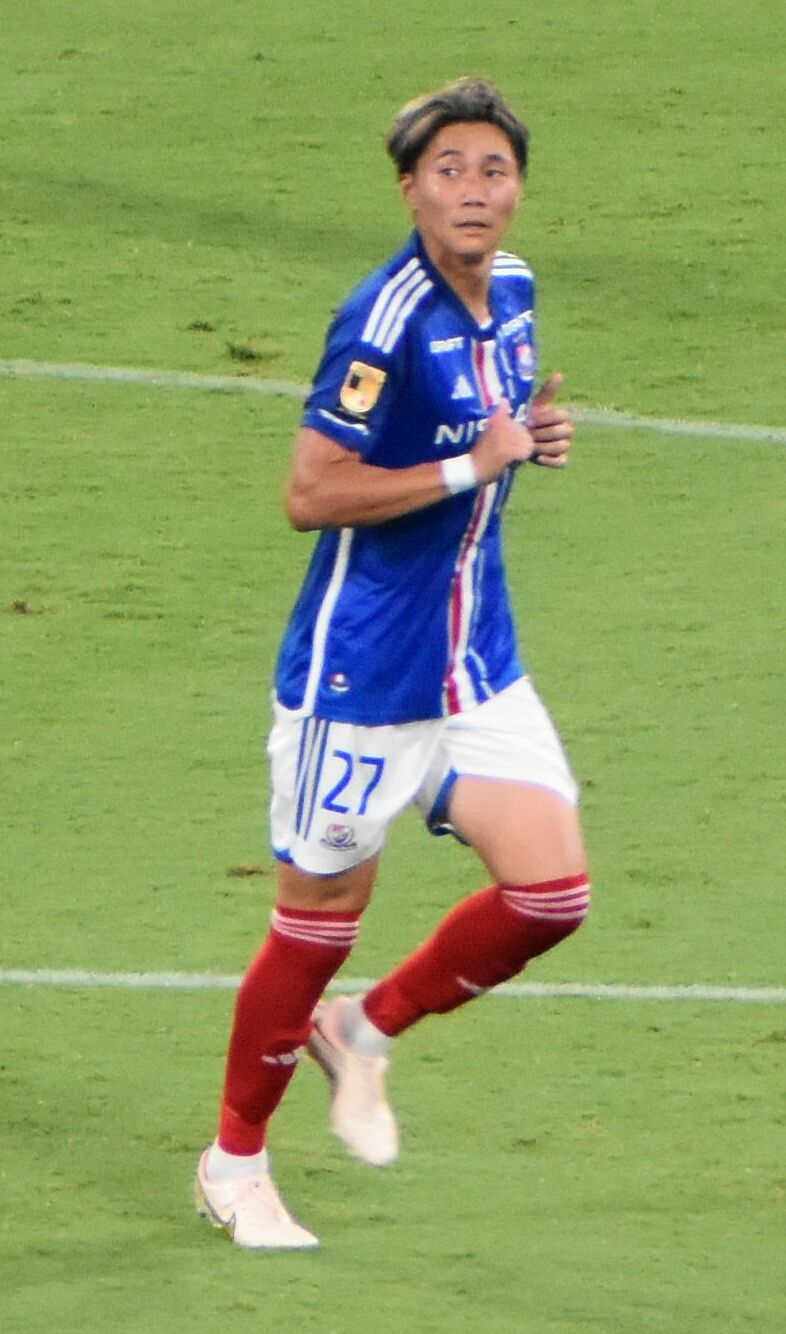
- Matsubara with Yokohama F. Marinos in 2023

Personal information
- Full name: Ken Matsubara
- Date of birth: 16 February 1993 (age 33)
- Place of birth: Usa, Ōita, Japan
- Height: 1.80 m (5 ft 11 in)
- Position: Right back

Team information
- Current team: Yokohama F. Marinos
- Number: 27

Youth career
- 1999–2004: Yokkaichi Minami SSC
- 2005–2007: FC Nakatsu
- 2008–2010: Oita Trinita

Senior career*
Years	Team	Apps	(Gls)
2010–2013	Oita Trinita	37	(0)
2014–2016	Albirex Niigata	48	(0)
2014–2015	→ J. League U-22 (loan)	1	(0)
2017–	Yokohama F. Marinos	208	(9)

International career^{‡}
2009	Japan U-17	3	(0)
2021–	Japan	1	(0)
Medal record
Yokohama F. Marinos
Runner-up	J.League Cup	2018
Runner-up	Emperor's Cup	2017
Representing Japan
AFC U-23 Championship
Gold medal – first place	2016 Qatar
- * Club domestic league appearances and goals as of 16 September 2025 ‡ National team caps and goals as of 30 March 2021

Ken Matsubara (松原 健, Matsubara Ken; born 16 February 1993) is a Japanese footballer currently playing for Yokohama F. Marinos.

== National team career ==
In October 2009, he was elected Japan U-17 national team for 2009 U-17 World Cup. He played full time in all 3 matches as a right back.

He made his debut for Japan national football team on 30 March 2021 in a World Cup qualifier against Mongolia.

== Career statistics ==
As of match played 8 December 2024.

Appearances and goals by club, season and competition
Club	Season	League			Cup		League Cup		Continental		Other		Total	
Club	Season	Division	Apps	Goals	Apps	Goals	Apps	Goals	Apps	Goals	Apps	Goals	Apps	Goals
Oita Trinita	2010	J2 League	9	0	1	0	—		—		—		10	0
Oita Trinita	2011	J2 League	10	0	2	0	—		—		—		12	0
Oita Trinita	2012	J2 League	10	0	1	0	—		—		—		11	0
Oita Trinita	2013	J1 League	8	0	1	0	4	0	—		—		13	0
Oita Trinita	Total		37	0	5	0	4	0	—		—		46	0
Albirex Niigata	2014	J1 League	31	0	2	0	5	0	—		—		38	0
Albirex Niigata	2015	J1 League	0	0	1	0	1	0	—		—		2	0
Albirex Niigata	2016	J1 League	17	0	2	0	1	0	—		—		20	0
Albirex Niigata	Total		48	0	5	0	7	0	—		—		60	0
Yokohama F. Marinos	2017	J1 League	26	1	6	0	0	0	—		—		32	1
Yokohama F. Marinos	2018	J1 League	29	1	1	0	9	0	—		—		39	1
Yokohama F. Marinos	2019	J1 League	14	1	1	0	3	1	—		—		18	2
Yokohama F. Marinos	2020	J1 League	20	1	—		1	0	6	0	1	0	28	1
Yokohama F. Marinos	2021	J1 League	22	1	1	0	3	0	—		—		26	1
Yokohama F. Marinos	2022	J1 League	21	1	2	0	2	0	4	0	—		29	1
Yokohama F. Marinos	2023	J1 League	26	2	0	0	7	1	6	0	0	0	39	3
Yokohama F. Marinos	2024	J1 League	29	1	1	1	3	0	10	0	—		43	2
Yokohama F. Marinos	Total		187	9	12	1	28	2	26	0	1	0	254	12
Career Total			272	9	22	1	39	2	26	0	1	0	360	12

== Appearances in major competitions ==
Team	Competition	Category	Appearances		Goals	Team record
Team	Competition	Category	Start	Sub	Goals	Team record
Japan	2009 FIFA U-17 World Cup	U-17	3	0	0	Group Stage

== Honours ==
=== Club ===
Yokohama F. Marinos

- J1 League: 2019, 2022
