= Jun Amano =

Japanese footballer (born 1991)

Jun Amano 天野 純
Personal information
- Full name: Jun Amano
- Date of birth: 19 July 1991 (age 35)
- Place of birth: Miura, Kanagawa, Japan
- Height: 1.75 m (5 ft 9 in)
- Position: Midfielder

Team information
- Current team: Yokohama F. Marinos
- Number: 20

Youth career
- Hasse FC
- Yokohama F. Marinos

College career
Years	Team	Apps	(Gls)
2010–2013	Juntendo University		

Senior career*
Years	Team	Apps	(Gls)
2014–	Yokohama F. Marinos	243	(32)
2019–2020	→ Lokeren (loan)	24	(3)
2022	→ Ulsan Hyundai (loan)	30	(9)
2023	→ Jeonbuk Hyundai Motors (loan)	25	(1)

International career
2018	Japan	1	(0)
Medal record
Yokohama F. Marinos
Runner-up	J.League Cup	2018
Runner-up	Emperor's Cup	2017
- * Club domestic league appearances and goals as of 11 August 2026

Jun Amano (天野 純, born 19 July 1991) is a Japanese professional footballer who plays for J.League 1 club Yokohama F. Marinos.

== Club career ==
Amano was born in Miura, Kanagawa, and spent his youth career in Yokohama F. Marinos' youth system. However, he was unable to join Yokohama's first team in 2010, and so instead joined Juntendo University to play university soccer.

On 24 December 2016, Yokohama FC advanced to the semi-finals of the 2016 Emperor's Cup after Amano scored a last minute winner against Gamba Osaka. He scored his first league goal for the club against FC Tokyo on 18 June 2017, scoring in the 88th minute.

In 2019, Amano was given the number 10 jersey, which was previously worn by Shunsuke Nakamura.

On 5 July 2019, Amano joined Belgian side Sporting Lokeren on a one year loan deal. However, the league was cut short due to the Covid-19 pandemic, and Lokeren declared bankruptcy in April 2020. Amano played in 24 league games and scored three goals.

On 8 January 2022, Amano joined South Korean side Ulsan HD FC on a season long loan. In July 2022, he was selected in the K League All-Star Team to play a friendly against Tottenham Hotspur, where he scored a direct free kick in the 71st minute.

On 5 January 2023, Amano joined fellow South Korean side Jeonbuk Hyundai Motors on a season long loan. On 28 December 2023, he returned from his loan spell.

== International career ==
Amano made his debut for the Japan national football team in 2018, coming on in a friendly match against Costa Rica.

== Style of play ==
Amano takes inspiration from David Silva, studying his game-planning and positioning. Amano has also been described as a powerful left-footed kicker.

== Career statistics ==
=== Club ===
Updated to 13 December 2023.

Club	Season	League			Cup		League Cup		Continental		Total	
Club	Season	Division	Apps	Goals	Apps	Goals	Apps	Goals	Apps	Goals	Apps	Goals
Yokohama F. Marinos	2014	J1 League	0	0	2	1	0	0	—		2	1
Yokohama F. Marinos	2015	J1 League	6	0	2	0	4	0	—		12	0
Yokohama F. Marinos	2016	J1 League	11	0	5	2	8	0	—		24	2
Yokohama F. Marinos	2017	J1 League	33	5	4	0	0	0	—		37	5
Yokohama F. Marinos	2018	J1 League	34	5	2	0	6	2	—		42	7
Yokohama F. Marinos	2019	J1 League	18	0	1	1	2	1	—		21	2
Yokohama F. Marinos	2020	J1 League	22	3	—		2	1	5	1	29	5
Yokohama F. Marinos	2021	J1 League	34	3	1	0	7	2	—		42	5
Yokohama F. Marinos	Total		158	16	17	4	29	6	5	1	209	27
Lokeren (loan)	2019–20	Belgian First Division B	24	3	2	1	—		—		26	4
Ulsan Hyundai (loan)	2022	K League 1	30	9	2	1	—		6	2	38	12
Jeonbuk Hyundai Motors (loan)	2023	K League 1	25	1	1	1	—		5	1	31	3
Career Total			237	29	22	7	29	6	16	4	304	46

=== National team ===
Japan national team
Year	Apps	Goals
2018	1	0
Total	1	0

== Honours ==
Yokohama F. Marinos

- Japanese Super Cup: 2014 Runners-Up

Ulsan Hyundai

- K League 1: 2022
