= 2023 Yokohama F. Marinos season =

Yokohama F. Marinos
2023 season
- Chairman: Akihiro Nakayama
- Manager: Kevin Muscat
- Stadium: Nissan Stadium
- J1 League: 2nd
- Emperor's Cup: Third round
- J.League Cup: Semi-finals
- AFC Champions League: Group stage
- Japanese Super Cup: Winners
- Top goalscorer: League: Anderson Lopes (21 goals); All: Anderson Lopes (24 goals)
- Highest home attendance: 42,772 (v. Kawasaki Frontale, J1 League, 15 July)
- Lowest home attendance: 4,287 (v. Briobecca Urayasu, Emperor's Cup, 7 June)
- Average home league attendance: 27,301
- Biggest win: 5–0 (v. Yokohama FC, J1 League, 8 April); 6–1 (v. Sagan Tosu, J.League Cup, 18 June)
- Biggest defeat: 4–1 (v. Yokohama FC, J1 League, 26 August)
Home colours	Away colours
- All statistics correct as of 23:06, 20 November 2023 (UTC).

The 2023 Yokohama F. Marinos season was the club's 51st season in existence and the 41st consecutive season in the top flight of Japanese football. In addition to the domestic league, in which they are the defending champions, Yokohama F. Marinos participates in this season's editions of the Emperor's Cup, the J.League Cup and the AFC Champions League.

The club officially started the 2023 season resuming training sessions on 10 January 2023. They unveiled the team for the 2023 season including new signings presentations, as well as new shirt number system, on 14 January 2023.

== Players ==
=== Current squad ===
As of 12 August 2023.

Note: Flags indicate national team as defined under FIFA eligibility rules; some limited exceptions apply. Players may hold more than one non-FIFA nationality.

No.	Pos.	Nation	Player
1	GK	JPN	Jun Ichimori (on loan from Gamba Osaka)
2	DF	JPN	Katsuya Nagato
4	DF	JPN	Shinnosuke Hatanaka
5	DF	BRA	Eduardo (vice-captain)
6	MF	JPN	Kota Watanabe
7	MF	BRA	Élber
8	MF	JPN	Takuya Kida (captain)
11	FW	BRA	Anderson Lopes
13	DF	JPN	Ryuta Koike (vice-captain)
14	FW	JPN	Asahi Uenaka
15	DF	JPN	Takumi Kamijima
17	MF	JPN	Kenta Inoue
18	MF	JPN	Kota Mizunuma (vice-captain)
19	DF	JPN	Yuki Saneto
20	MF	BRA	Yan Matheus
21	GK	JPN	Hiroki Iikura
23	FW	JPN	Ryo Miyaichi
24	DF	JPN	Hijiri Kato

No.	Pos.	Nation	Player
25	MF	JPN	Kaina Yoshio
26	DF	JPN	Yuta Koike
27	DF	JPN	Ken Matsubara
28	MF	JPN	Riku Yamane
29	MF	KOR	Nam Tae-hee
30	FW	JPN	Takuma Nishimura
31	GK	JPN	Fuma Shirasaka
33	DF	JPN	Ryotaro Tsunoda
35	MF	JPN	Keigo Sakakibara
36	FW	JPN	Yuhi Murakami
38	DF	JPN	Manato Yoshida ^{DSP}
41	FW	JPN	Kenyu Sugimoto (on loan from Júbilo Iwata)
42	MF	JPN	Shunta Ikeda ^{Type 2}
43	DF	JPN	Daisuke Funaki ^{Type 2}
44	DF	JPN	Yuma Hatano ^{Type 2}
45	MF	JPN	Kohei Mochizuki ^{Type 2}
46	MF	JPN	Kento Shirasu ^{Type 2}
50	GK	JPN	Powell Obinna Obi

=== Out on loan ===
Note: Flags indicate national team as defined under FIFA eligibility rules; some limited exceptions apply. Players may hold more than one non-FIFA nationality.

No.	Pos.	Nation	Player
—	GK	JPN	Riku Terakado (on loan to Renofa Yamaguchi)
—	GK	JPN	Tomoki Tagawa (on loan to Kataller Toyama)
—	DF	JPN	Yusuke Nishida (on loan to AC Nagano Parceiro)
—	MF	JPN	Eitaro Matsuda (on loan to Albirex Niigata)
—	MF	JPN	Jun Amano (on loan to Jeonbuk Hyundai Motors)

No.	Pos.	Nation	Player
—	MF	JPN	Keita Ueda (on loan to Tochigi SC)
—	MF	JPN	Shunsuke Hirai (on loan to Reilac Shiga)
—	MF	JPN	Takuto Kimura (on loan to Ehime FC)
—	MF	JPN	Takuto Minami (on loan to Iwate Grulla Morioka)
—	FW	JPN	Takumi Tsukui (on loan to Azul Claro Numazu)

== Transfers ==
Transfers in
Join on	Pos.	Player	Moving from	Transfer type
21 Mar	FW	(Japan) Kenyu Sugimoto	(Japan) Júbilo Iwata	Loan transfer
2 Mar	MF	(Japan) Manato Yoshida	(Japan) NIFS Kanoya	Loan transfer; 2023 DSP
22 Feb	GK	(Japan) Jun Ichimori	(Japan) Gamba Osaka	Loan transfer
Pre-season	GK	(Japan) Hiroki Iikura	(Japan) Vissel Kobe	Full transfer
Pre-season	GK	(Japan) Fuma Shirasaka	(Japan) Kagoshima United	Loan return
Pre-season	DF	(Japan) Takumi Kamijima	(Japan) Kashiwa Reysol	Full transfer
Pre-season	MF	(Japan) Kenta Inoue	(Japan) Oita Trinita	Full transfer
Pre-season	MF	(Japan) Takuto Kimura	(Japan) Meiji University	Full transfer
Pre-season	MF	(Japan) Yuhi Murakami	(Japan) Kanto Gakuen University	Full transfer
Pre-season	MF	(Japan) Keigo Sakakibara	(Japan) ReinMeer Aomori	Loan return
Pre-season	FW	(Japan) Asahi Uenaka	(Japan) V-Varen Nagasaki	Full transfer

Transfers out
Leave on	Pos.	Player	Moving to	Transfer type
Pre-season	GK	(Japan) Yohei Takaoka	(Canada) Vancouver Whitecaps	Full transfer
Pre-season	GK	(Japan) Hirotsugu Nakabayashi	(Japan) Nankatsu SC	Full transfer
Pre-season	DF	(Japan) Ko Ikeda	(Japan) Esperanza SC	Full transfer
Pre-season	DF	(Japan) Yusuke Nishida	(Japan) Nagano Parceiro	Loan transfer
Pre-season	MF	(Japan) Naoki Tsubaki	(Japan) JEF United Chiba	Full transfer
Pre-season	MF	(Japan) Tomoki Iwata	(Scotland) Celtic FC	Loan transfer
Pre-season	MF	(Japan) Jun Amano	(South Korea) Jeonbuk Hyundai Motors	Loan transfer
Pre-season	MF	(Japan) Takumi Tsukui	(Japan) Azul Claro Numazu	Loan transfer
Pre-season	MF	(Japan) Shunsuke Hirai	(Japan) Reilac Shiga	Loan transfer
Pre-season	FW	(Japan) Yushi Yamaya	(Singapore) Geylang International	Full transfer
Pre-season	FW	(Brazil) Léo Ceará	(Japan) Cerezo Osaka	Full transfer
Pre-season	FW	(Japan) Teruhito Nakagawa	(Japan) FC Tokyo	Full transfer
Pre-season	FW	(Japan) Ryonosuke Kabayama	(Japan) Sagan Tosu	Full transfer
Pre-season	FW	(Japan) Talla Ndao	(Japan) FC Osaka	Full transfer

== Pre-season friendlies ==
21 January Training match	Yokohama F. Marinos	3–0	(Japan) Verspah Oita	Miyazaki
11:30 JST	Uenaka 37'; Yan 55'; Anderson Lopes 83'	Report		Stadium: Seagaya Square 1
Note: The match was played with three halves of 30 minutes in each.

25 January Training match	Yokohama F. Marinos	5–1	(Japan) Zweigen Kanazawa	Miyazaki
11:00 JST	Anderson Lopes 23', 25'; Murakami 66'; Élber 98'; Uenaka 119'	Report	73'	Stadium: Seagaya Square 1
Note: The match was played with four halves of 30 minutes in each.

== Mid-season friendlies ==
19 July International friendly match	Yokohama F. Marinos	6–4	(Scotland) Celtic	Yokohama
19:03 JST	Lopes 4', 59'; Mizunuma 23'; Saneto 66'; Miyaichi 85', 88'	Report	Maeda 6', 21', 42'; Turnbull 90+2'	Stadium: Nissan Stadium; Attendance: 20,263; Referee: K. Fukushima

23 July International friendly match	Yokohama F. Marinos	3–5	(England) Manchester City	Tokyo
19:00 JST	Lopes 27'; Matsubara 37'; Inoue 86'		Stones 40'; Álvarez 43'; Haaland 52', 90+2'; Rodri 72'	Stadium: Japan National Stadium; Attendance: 61,618; Referee: Hiroki Kasahara

== Competitions ==
=== Overall record ===
Competition	First match	Last match	Starting round	Final position	Record							
Competition	First match	Last match	Starting round	Final position	Pld	W	D	L	GF	GA	GD	Win %
J1 League	17 February	--	Matchday 1	TBD	33	19	7	7	62	37	+25	57.58
Emperor's Cup	8 March	12 July	Second round	Third round	2	1	0	1	3	4	−1	50.00
J.League Cup	7 June	15 October	Group stage	Semi-final	10	7	0	3	20	10	+10	70.00
AFC Champions League	18 September	--	Group stage	TBD	4	3	0	1	8	5	+3	75.00
Super Cup	11 February 2023		Final	Winners	1	1	0	0	2	1	+1	100.00
Total					50	31	7	12	95	57	+38	62.00

Source: Soccerway

=== J1 League ===
Marinos is the current champions of the competition, winning the last season title on the last round after beating Vissel Kobe by 3–1. They stayed 2 points off Kawasaki Frontale, who also won their last league match against FC Tokyo, meaning that if Marinos had lost to Vissel, Frontale would be crowned J1 champions for a third consecutive season. With this title win, Marinos started the season as the second team with most J1 League titles, with 5 in total. They need 3 more titles to tie with 8-times J1 champions Kashima Antlers.

==== League table ====
Pos	Team	Pld	W	D	L	GF	GA	GD	Pts	Qualification or relegation
1	Vissel Kobe (C)	34	21	8	5	60	29	+31	71	Qualification for the AFC Champions League Elite league stage
2	Yokohama F. Marinos	34	19	7	8	63	40	+23	64	Qualification for the AFC Champions League Elite league stage
3	Sanfrecce Hiroshima	34	17	7	10	42	28	+14	58	Qualification for the AFC Champions League Two group stage
4	Urawa Red Diamonds	34	15	12	7	42	27	+15	57	
5	Kashima Antlers	34	14	10	10	43	34	+9	52	

Source: JLeague.jp, J.League Data Site
Rules for classification: 1) Points; 2) Goal difference; 3) Goals scored; 4) Head-to-head points; 5) Head-to-head goal difference; 6) Head-to-head goals scored; 7) Fewer disciplinary points.
(C) Champions

==== Results summary ====
Overall								Home						Away					
Pld	W	D	L	GF	GA	GD	Pts	W	D	L	GF	GA	GD	W	D	L	GF	GA	GD
33	19	7	7	62	37	+25	64	11	4	2	36	15	+21	8	3	5	26	22	+4

Last updated: 24 November 2023.
Source: worldfootball.net

==== Matches ====
The opening match was released by the J.League on 23 December 2022. The full league fixtures were released on 20 January 2023.

17 February 1	Kawasaki Frontale	1–2	Yokohama F. Marinos	Kawasaki
19:00 JST	Jesiel (red card) 87'; Tachibanada 90+1'; João Schmidt (yellow card) 90+5'	Report	Nishimura 4'; Élber 38'; Mizunuma (yellow card) 41'	Stadium: Kawasaki Todoroki Stadium; Attendance: 22,563; Referee: Yudai Yamamoto

25 February 2	Yokohama F. Marinos	2–0	Urawa Red Diamonds	Yokohama
14:00 JST	Anderson Lopes 18'; Yan Matheus 89'	Report	Sakai (yellow card) 68'; Akimoto (yellow card) 81'	Stadium: Nissan Stadium; Attendance: 34,035; Referee: Akihiko Ikeuchi

3 March 3	Yokohama F. Marinos	1–1	Sanfrecce Hiroshima	Yokohama
19:00 JST	Anderson Lopes 19'; Inoue (yellow card) 40'; Nagato (red card) 77'; Tsunoda (yellow card) 90+4'	Report	Higashi 4' (yellow card) 29'; Ben Khalifa (yellow card) 65'; Sotiriou (yellow card) 71'; Notsuda (yellow card) 74'	Stadium: Nippatsu Mitsuzawa Stadium; Attendance: 10,854; Referee: Futoshi Nakamura

12 March 4	Hokkaido Consadole Sapporo	2–0	Yokohama F. Marinos	Sapporo
15:00 JST	Ogashiwa 8'; Tanaka (yellow card) 34'; Kobayashi 77'	Report		Stadium: Sapporo Dome; Attendance: 17,509; Referee: Koichiro Fukushima

18 March 5	Yokohama F. Marinos	2–1	Kashima Antlers	Yokohama
14:00 JST	Nishimura (yellow card) 30'; Matsubara 56'; Tsunemoto 62' (o.g.); Watanabe (yellow card) 70'	Report	Suzuki 68' (yellow card) 70'; Anzai (yellow card) 90'; Diego Pituca (yellow card) 90+6' (yellow-red card) 90+7'	Stadium: Nissan Stadium; Attendance: 28,478; Referee: Ryo Tanimoto

1 April 6	Cerezo Osaka	2–1	Yokohama F. Marinos	Osaka
16:00 JST	Léo Ceará 16', 35'; Capixaba (yellow card) 86'	Report	T. Kida (yellow card) 58'; H. Kida 83' (o.g.)	Stadium: Yodoko Sakura Stadium; Attendance: 18,955; Referee: Jumpei Iida

8 April 7	Yokohama F. Marinos	5–0	Yokohama FC	Yokohama
19:00 JST	Watanabe (yellow card) 45+1'; Marcos Júnior 47'; Élber (yellow card) 56', (goal) 68', 73'; Lopes 62', 90'	Report	Yamashita (yellow card) 90+1'	Stadium: Nissan Stadium; Attendance: 25,238; Referee: Hiroyuki Kimura

15 April 8	Shonan Bellmare	1–1	Yokohama F. Marinos	Hiratsuka
15:00 JST	Elyounoussi (yellow card) 32'; Hata (yellow card) 69'; Suzuki 81'; Sugioka (yellow card) 90+1'	Report	Anderson Lopes 65'; Watanabe (yellow card) 68'	Stadium: Lemon Gas Stadium Hiratsuka; Attendance: 9,355; Referee: Masuya Ueda

22 April 9	Vissel Kobe	2–3	Yokohama F. Marinos	Kobe
19:00 JST	Yuruki 19'; Osako 28'; Saito (yellow card) 31'; Yamaguchi (yellow card) 66'	Report	Anderson Lopes 33', 82'; Watanabe 45+2'	Stadium: Noevir Stadium Kobe; Attendance: 22,164; Referee: Yoshiro Imamura

29 April 10	Yokohama F. Marinos	1–1	Nagoya Grampus	Yokohama
15:00 JST	Kida 72' (yellow card) 90+1'	Report	Mateus (yellow card) 13'; Nogami (yellow card) 39'; Morishita 41'	Stadium: Nissan Stadium; Attendance: 33,048; Referee: Yoshimi Yamashita

3 May 11	Sagan Tosu	1–3	Yokohama F. Marinos	Tosu
15:00 JST	Honda 3'	Report	Yan Matheus 11', 21'; Kida (yellow card) 54'; Élber 60'	Stadium: Ekimae Real Estate Stadium; Attendance: 11,354; Referee: Hayato Shimizu

7 May 12	Yokohama F. Marinos	4–1	Kyoto Sanga	Yokohama
14:00 JST	Nishimura 10'; Fujita (yellow card) 44'; Asada 49' (o.g.); Yan Matheus 64'; Mizunuma 86'	Report	Araki (yellow card) 12'; Toyokawa (yellow card) 29'; Patric (yellow card) 44'; Asada (yellow card) 90+4'; Misawa (yellow card) 90+5'	Stadium: Nissan Stadium; Attendance: 22,160; Referee: Masuya Ueda

14 May 13	Albirex Niigata	2–1	Yokohama F. Marinos	Niigata
13:30 JST	Ito 57'; Mito 67'	Report	Fujita 45+1'	Stadium: Denka Big Swan Stadium; Attendance: 24,501; Referee: Koichiro Fukushima

20 May 14	Gamba Osaka	0–2	Yokohama F. Marinos	Osaka
19:00 JST	Fukuoka (yellow card) 58'; Usami (yellow card) 78'	Report	Matsubara (yellow card) 11' (yellow-red card) 59'; Nishimura 37'; Hatanaka (yellow card) 51'; Lopes (yellow card) 71'; Nagato 79'; Iikura (yellow card) 90+5'	Stadium: Panasonic Stadium Suita; Attendance: 19,823; Referee: Hiroyuki Kimura

28 May 15	Yokohama F. Marinos	2–0	Avispa Fukuoka	Yokohama
14:00 JST	Anderson Lopes 8', 20'; Kamijima (yellow card) 51'; Eduardo (yellow card) 90+5'	Report	Douglas Grolli (yellow card) 64'	Stadium: Nissan Stadium; Attendance: 26,115; Referee: Yoshimi Yamashita

3 June 16	FC Tokyo	2–3	Yokohama F. Marinos	Tokyo
15:00 JST	Diego Oliveira 34', 44'; Nakagawa (yellow card) 57'; Matsuki (red card) 69'; Abe (yellow card) 90+9'	Report	Anderson Lopes 1', 62'; Marcos Júnior 89'	Stadium: Ajinomoto Stadium; Attendance: 28,553; Referee: Hayato Shimizu

10 June 17	Yokohama F. Marinos	4–3	Kashiwa Reysol	Yokohama
16:00 JST	Anderson Lopes 13' (pen.), 90+4'; Nishimura (yellow card) 39'; Élber 41'; Hatanaka (yellow card) 69'; Miyaichi 90+7'	Report	Eduardo 40' (o.g.); Toshima 46'; Katayama (yellow card) 64'; Grot 73'; Takamine (yellow card) 76'; Tatsuta (yellow card) 87' (yellow-red card) 87'; Muto (yellow card) FT	Stadium: Nissan Stadium; Attendance: 26,946; Referee: Akihiko Ikeuchi

24 June 18	Sanfrecce Hiroshima	0–1	Yokohama F. Marinos	Hiroshima
19:00 JST	Douglas Vieira (yellow card) 64'	Report	Élber 40'	Stadium: Edion Stadium Hiroshima; Attendance: 15,163; Referee: Jumpei Iida

2 July 19	Yokohama F. Marinos	4–1	Shonan Bellmare	Yokohama
19:00 JST	Matsubara 6'; Anderson Lopes 10', 51'; Uenaka 77'; Inoue (yellow card) 85'	Report	Ishihara (yellow card) 15'; Oiwa (yellow card) 45+3'; Machino 75' (pen.) (yellow card) 90+3'	Stadium: Nissan Stadium; Attendance: 21,160; Referee: Futoshi Nakamura

8 July 20	Nagoya Grampus	2–2	Yokohama F. Marinos	Toyota
18:03 JST	Nagai 8'; Junker 47'	Report	Élber 28'; Fujita 35'	Stadium: Toyota Stadium; Attendance: 29,743; Referee: Yusuke Araki

15 July 21	Yokohama F. Marinos	0–1	Kawasaki Frontale	Yokohama
19:04 JST		Report	Kurumaya 90+4'	Stadium: Nissan Stadium; Attendance: 42,772; Referee: Khamis Al-Marri

6 August 22	Urawa Red Diamonds	0–0	Yokohama F. Marinos	Saitama
19:00 JST		Report		Stadium: Saitama Stadium 2002; Attendance: 42,664; Referee: Hiroyuki Kimura

12 August 23	Yokohama F. Marinos	2–1	Gamba Osaka	Yokohama
19:33 JST	Yan 34'; Lopes 51' (pen.); Élber (yellow card) 45+4' (yellow-red card) 65'	Report	Meshino 44'	Stadium: Nissan Stadium; Attendance: 33,261; Referee: Akihiko Ikeuchi

19 August 24	Yokohama F. Marinos	2–1	FC Tokyo	Yokohama
19:30 JST	Nagato 12'; Watanabe 90+1'	Report	Oliveira 23'	Stadium: Nissan Stadium; Attendance: 33,701; Referee: Jumpei Iida

26 August 25	Yokohama FC	4–1	Yokohama F. Marinos	Yokohama
18:30 JST	Hayashi 36'; Ito 52'; Eduardo 62' (o.g.); Yoshino 90+3'	Report	Lopes 9'	Stadium: NHK Spring Mitsuzawa Football Stadium; Attendance: 13,321; Referee: Yuichi Nishimura

1 September 26	Kashiwa Reysol	2–0	Yokohama F. Marinos	Kashiwa
19:03 JST	Yamada 52'; Sávio 83' (pen.)	Report		Stadium: Sankyo Frontier Kashiwa Stadium; Attendance: 12,601; Referee: Yusuke Araki

15 September 27	Yokohama F. Marinos	1–1	Sagan Tosu	Yokohama
19:33 JST	Yoshio 90'	Report	Naganuma 87'	Stadium: NHK Spring Mitsuzawa Football Stadium; Attendance: 7,771; Referee: Masuya Ueda

24 September 28	Kashima Antlers	1–2	Yokohama F. Marinos	Kashima
15:04 JST	Suzuki 15'	Report	Lopes 34', 50'	Stadium: Kashima Soccer Stadium; Attendance: 27,463; Referee: Futoshi Nakamura

29 September 29	Yokohama F. Marinos	0–2	Vissel Kobe	Yokohama
19:03 JST		Report	Osako 23' (pen.); Muto 43'	Stadium: Nissan Stadium; Attendance: 30,800; Referee: Yuichi Nishimura

21 October 30	Yokohama F. Marinos	4–1	Hokkaido Consadole Sapporo	Yokohama
14:03 JST	Miyaichi 19'; Sugimoto 84'; Élber 90+1'; Uenaka 90+6'	Report	Tanaka 90+3'	Stadium: Nissan Stadium; Attendance: 23,286; Referee: Hayato Shimizu

28 October 31	Avispa Fukuoka	0–4	Yokohama F. Marinos	Fukuoka
14:03 JST		Report	Lopes 19', 25'; Uenaka 48'; Miyaichi 90+9'	Stadium: Best Denki Stadium; Attendance: 13,855; Referee: Koei Koya

12 November 32	Yokohama F. Marinos	2–0	Cerezo Osaka	Yokohama
14:03 JST	Yan 41'; Élber 45+1'	Report		Stadium: Nissan Stadium; Attendance: 37,204; Referee: Hiroyuki Kimura

24 November 33	Yokohama F. Marinos	0–0	Albirex Niigata	Yokohama
19:03 JST		Report		Stadium: Nissan Stadium; Attendance: 34,335; Referee: Koichiro Fukushima

2 December 34	Kyoto Sanga	v	Yokohama F. Marinos	Kyoto
--:-- JST				Stadium: Sanga Stadium by Kyocera

=== Emperor's Cup ===
As a J1 League club, Marinos starts the competition at the second round, not having to play prefectural qualifiers.

7 June Second round	Yokohama F. Marinos	2–0	Briobecca Urayasu	Yokohama
19:00	Inoue 26'; Eduardo 78'	Report	Ikawa (yellow card) 61'; Kawashima (yellow card) 77'	Stadium: NHK Spring Mitsuzawa Football Stadium; Attendance: 4,287; Referee: Koichiro Fukushima

12 July Third round	Yokohama F. Marinos	1-4	Machida Zelvia	Machida
19:00		Report		Stadium: Machida GION Stadium; Attendance: 6,361; Referee: Yuichi Nishimura

=== J.League Cup ===
As Marinos qualified for the AFC Champions League, the club would immediately be awarded a bye from the competition's group stage, entering it only in the quarter-finals. However, as the continental tournament only starts on September, instead of early in the year (as usual), Marinos had to play the group stage alongside the other 19 participating teams.

Pos	Team	Pld	W	D	L	GF	GA	GD	Pts	Qualification
1	Yokohama F. Marinos	6	5	0	1	14	5	+9	15	Advance to knockout stage
2	Hokkaido Consadole Sapporo	6	3	1	2	13	10	+3	10	Advance to knockout stage
3	Júbilo Iwata	6	2	0	4	8	9	−1	6	
4	Sagan Tosu	6	1	1	4	4	15	−11	4	

Source: JLeague.co (EN), JLeague.jp (JA)
Rules for classification: Tiebreakers

8 March	Yokohama F. Marinos	1–0	Júbilo Iwata	Yokohama
19:03	Suzuki 49' (o.g.)	Report		Stadium: Nissan Stadium; Attendance: 7,077; Referee: Yoshiro Imamura

26 March	Sagan Tosu	0–2	Yokohama F. Marinos	Tosu
15:03	Narahara (yellow card) 31'; Sakamoto (yellow card) 56'	Report	Uenaka 79'; Yoshio 86'	Stadium: Ekimae Real Estate Stadium; Attendance: 6,615; Referee: Yuichi Nishimura

5 April	Yokohama F. Marinos	2–1	Hokkaido Consadole Sapporo	Yokohama
19:03	Marcos Júnior 10'; Nishi 26' (o.g.); Murakami (yellow card) 89'	Report	Nakashima 6' (yellow card) 27'	Stadium: Nissan Stadium; Attendance: 6,269; Referee: Takuto Okabe

19 April	Júbilo Iwata	0–1	Yokohama F. Marinos	Iwata
19:03		Report	Yan Matheus 7'; Inoue (yellow card) 33'; Koike (yellow card) 81'	Stadium: Yamaha Stadium; Attendance: 3,526; Referee: Koei Koya

24 May	Hokkaido Consadole Sapporo	3–2	Yokohama F. Marinos	Sapporo
19:03	Nakamura (yellow card) 40'; Fukai (yellow card) 45+3'; Lucas Fernandes 57'; Tučić 65'; Aoki 84'	Report	Matsubara 49'; Sakakibara 76'	Stadium: Sapporo Dome; Attendance: 5,923; Referee: Ryo Tanimoto

18 June	Yokohama F. Marinos	6–1	Sagan Tosu	Yokohama
19:03	Nagato (yellow card) 14' (yellow-red card) 80'; Nishimura 24' (pen.), 49'; Yan Matheus (yellow card) 44'; Miyaichi 67'; Uenaka 68', 89'; Yoshio 72'	Report	Sakamoto (yellow card) 24'; Suzuki 90+3'	Stadium: Nissan Stadium; Attendance: 6,939; Referee: Koji Takasaki

==== Quarter-finals ====
6 September Leg 1	Hokkaido Consadole Sapporo	3–2	Yokohama F. Marinos	Sapporo
19:03	Okamura 27'; Ogashiwa 74', 90+5'	JLeague.co (EN); JLeague.jp (JA)	Uenaka 8'; Mizunuma 48'	Stadium: Sapporo Dome; Attendance: 7,566; Referee: Hajime Matsuo

10 September Leg 2	Yokohama F. Marinos	3–0	Hokkaido Consadole Sapporo	Yokohama
18:03	Mizunuma 32'; Anderson Lopes 48'; Nam Tae-hee 50'	JLeague.co (EN); JLeague.jp (JA)		Stadium: Nippatsu Mitsuzawa Stadium; Attendance: 10,423; Referee: Jumpei Iida

Yokohama F. Marinos won 5–3 on aggregate.

==== Semi-finals ====
11 October Leg 1	Yokohama F. Marinos	1–0	Urawa Red Diamonds	Yokohama
19:03	Anderson Lopes 61' (pen.)	JLeague.co (EN); JLeague.jp (JA)		Stadium: Nissan Stadium; Attendance: 13,337; Referee: Akihiko Ikeuchi

15 October Leg 2	Urawa Red Diamonds	2–0	Yokohama F. Marinos	Saitama
17:03	Scholz 63' (pen.), 90+1' (pen.)	JLeague.co (EN); JLeague.jp (JA)		Stadium: Saitama Stadium 2002; Attendance: 29,504; Referee: Ryu Tanimoto

Urawa Red Diamonds won 2–1 on aggregate.

=== Super Cup ===
11 February	Yokohama F. Marinos	2–1	Ventforet Kofu	Japan National Stadium
13:35 JST	Élber 30'; Nishimura 61'	Report	Utaka 44'	Attendance: 50,923; Referee: Yusuke Araki

=== AFC Champions League ===
Marinos qualified to play the 2023–24 AFC Champions League as 2022 J1 League champions. With the title, the club earned a direct entry to the competition's group stage. The group stage is planned by the AFC to start on 18 September 2023.

==== Group stage ====
Pos	Team	Pld	W	D	L	GF	GA	GD	Pts	Qualification
1	(Japan) Yokohama F. Marinos	6	4	0	2	12	7	+5	12 (Note: Head-to-head goal difference: Yokohama F. Marinos +1, Shandong Taishan 0, Incheon United −1.)	Advance to round of 16
2	(China) Shandong Taishan	6	4	0	2	14	7	+7	12	Advance to round of 16
3	(South Korea) Incheon United	6	4	0	2	14	9	+5	12	
4	(Philippines) Kaya–Iloilo	6	0	0	6	4	21	−17	0	

Source: AFC
Rules for classification: Tiebreakers
Notes:

19 September	Yokohama F. Marinos	2–4	(South Korea) Incheon United	Yokohama
19:00 UTC+9	Nishimura 17'; Miyaichi 43'	Report	Ichimori 8' (o.g.); Gerso Fernandes 37'; Hernandes 75', 79'	Stadium: Nissan Stadium; Attendance: 7,010; Referee: Khalid Saleh (Saudi Arabia)

3 October	Shandong Taishan (China)	0–1	Yokohama F. Marinos	Jinan
20:00 UTC+8		Report	Mizunuma 37'	Stadium: Jinan Olympic Sports Center Stadium; Attendance: 43,783; Referee: Ahmed Issa (United Arab Emirates)

25 October	Yokohama F. Marinos	3–0	(Philippines) Kaya–Iloilo	Yokohama
19:00 UTC+9	Mizunuma 35'; Sugimoto 72'; Anderson Lopes 90+5'	Report		Stadium: Nissan Stadium; Attendance: 7,524; Referee: Sadullo Gulmurodi (Tajikistan)

7 November	Kaya–Iloilo (Philippines)	1–2	Yokohama F. Marinos	Manila
20:00 UTC+8	Horikoshi 39'; Mendy (red card) 82'	Report	Murakami 26'; Yan Matheus 87'	Stadium: Rizal Memorial Stadium; Attendance: 956; Referee: Ammar Ashkanani (Kuwait)

28 November	Incheon United (South Korea)	2–1	Yokohama F. Marinos	Incheon
19:00 UTC+9	Hong Si-hoo 11'; Hernandes 69'	Report	Élber 83'	Stadium: Incheon Football Stadium; Referee: Ammar Ashkanani (Kuwait)

== Goalscorers ==
As of 20 November 2023

Rank	Pos.	No.	Player	J1 League	Emperor's Cup	J.League Cup	AFC CL	Super Cup	Total
1	FW	11	(Brazil) Anderson Lopes	21	0	2	1	0	24
2	MF	7	(Brazil) Élber	9	0	0	1	1	11
3	FW	20	(Brazil) Yan Matheus	6	0	1	1	0	8
4	FW	30	(Japan) Takuma Nishimura	3	0	2	1	1	7
4	FW	14	(Japan) Asahi Uenaka	3	0	4	0	0	7
6	MF	23	(Japan) Ryo Miyaichi	3	1	1	1	0	6
7	MF	18	(Japan) Kota Mizunuma	1	0	2	2	0	5
8	MF	10	(Brazil) Marcos Júnior	2	0	1	0	0	3
8	DF	27	(Japan) Ken Matsubara	2	0	1	0	0	3
8	MF	25	(Japan) Kaina Yoshio	1	0	2	0	0	3
8	–	–	Own goal	3	0	0	0	0	3
12	DF	2	(Japan) Katsuya Nagato	2	0	0	0	0	2
12	MF	6	(Japan) Kota Watanabe	2	0	0	0	0	2
12	MF	16	(Japan) Joel Chima Fujita	2	0	0	0	0	2
12	FW	31	(Japan) Kenyu Sugimoto	1	0	0	1	0	2
16	DF	5	(Brazil) Eduardo	0	1	0	0	0	1
16	MF	8	(Japan) Takuya Kida	1	0	0	0	0	1
16	MF	17	(Japan) Kenta Inoue	0	1	0	0	0	1
16	MF	35	(Japan) Keigo Sakakibara	0	0	1	0	0	1
16	FW	29	(South Korea) Nam Tae-hee	0	0	1	0	0	1
16	FW	36	(Japan) Yuhi Murakami	0	0	0	1	0	1
Total				62	3	18	9	2	94

Last updated: 28 November 2023.
Source: jleague.co, besoccer.com
