= 2025 Yokohama F. Marinos season =

Yokohama F. Marinos
2025 season
- Chairman: Akihiro Nakayama
- Manager: Steve Holland (until 18 Apr 2025); Patrick Kisnorbo (Interim until -)
- Stadium: Nissan Stadium
- J1 League: 15th
- Emperor's Cup: Second round
- J.League Cup: Quarter-finals
- 2024–25 AFC Champions League Elite: Quarter-finals
- Top goalscorer: League: Daiya Tōno (5 goals); All: Daiya Tōno (6 goals)
- Average home league attendance: 26,578
Home colours	Away colours	Third colours
- All statistics correct as of 19 April 2025.

The 2025 Yokohama F. Marinos season is the club's 52nd season in existence and the 43rd consecutive season in the top flight of Japanese football. In addition to the domestic league, Yokohama F. Marinos are participating in this season's editions of the Emperor's Cup, the J.League Cup and reached the quarter-finals of the AFC Champions League Elite.

== Players ==
No.	Name	Nationality	Date of birth (age)	Previous club	Contract since	Contract end
Goalkeepers
19	Park Il-gyu	(Japan) (South Korea)	22 December 1989 (age 36)	(Japan) Sagan Tosu	2025	2027
21	Hiroki Iikura	(Japan)	1 June 1986 (age 39)	(Japan) Vissel Kobe	2023	2024
31	Ryoya Kimura	(Japan)	10 June 2003 (age 22)	(Japan) Nihon University	2025	2027
Defenders
13	Jeison Quiñónes	(Colombia)	17 August 1997 (age 28)	(Colombia) Águilas Doradas	2025	
16	Ren Kato	(Japan)	28 December 1999 (age 26)	(Japan) Tokyo Verdy	2024	
22	Ryotaro Tsunoda	(Japan)	27 June 1999 (age 26)	(England) Cardiff City	2025	2027
27	Ken Matsubara	(Japan)	6 February 1993 (age 33)	(Japan) Albirex Niigata	2017	
33	Kosei Suwama	(Japan)	6 June 2003 (age 22)	(Japan) Tsukuba University	2025	
39	Taiki Watanabe	(Japan)	22 April 1999 (age 27)	(Japan) Albirex Niigata	2024	
43	Reno Noguchi	(Japan)	30 May 2006 (age 19)	Youth Team	2025	
44	Thomas Deng	(Australia) (Kenya)	20 March 1997 (age 29)	(Japan) Albirex Niigata	2025	
Midfielders
6	Kota Watanabe	(Japan)	18 October 1998 (age 27)	(Japan) Tokyo Verdy	2019	2027
8	Takuya Kida	(Japan)	23 August 1994 (age 31)	Youth Team	2012	
17	Kenta Inoue	(Japan)	23 July 1998 (age 27)	(Japan) Oita Trinita	2023	
18	George Onaiwu	(Japan)	11 November 2000 (age 25)	(Japan) Vegalta Sendai	2025	
20	Jun Amano	(Japan)	19 July 1991 (age 34)	(South Korea) Jeonbuk Hyundai Motors	2014	2027
25	Toichi Suzuki	(Japan)	30 May 2000 (age 25)	(Japan) Kyoto Sanga	2025	
28	Riku Yamane	(Japan)	24 August 2003 (age 22)	Youth Team	2022	
34	Takuto Kimura	(Japan)	3 July 1991 (age 34)	(Japan) Ehime FC	2023	2024
35	Kanta Sekitomi	(Japan)	23 October 2005 (age 20)	(Japan) Toin University	2025	
41	Kosuke Matsumura	(Japan)	2 May 2004 (age 22)	(Japan) Hosei University	2025	
45	Kodjo Aziangbe	(Togo)	14 December 2003 (age 22)	(Saudi Arabia) Al Nassr FC	2024	2026
Strikers
9	Daiya Tono	(Japan)	14 March 1999 (age 27)	(Japan) Kawasaki Frontale	2025	2027
14	Asahi Uenaka	(Japan)	1 November 2001 (age 24)	(Japan) Yokohama F. Marinos	2023	
23	Ryo Miyaichi	(Japan)	14 December 1992 (age 33)	(Germany) FC St. Pauli	2021	
26	Dean David	(Israel)	14 March 1996 (age 30)	(Israel) Maccabi Haifa	2025	
30	Yuri Araujo	(Brazil)	13 April 1996 (age 30)	(Portugal) Viseu	2025	
37	Jordy Croux	(Belgium)	15 January 1994 (age 32)	(Japan) Júbilo Iwata	2025	
46	Hiroto Asada	(Japan)	16 January 2008 (age 18)	Youth Team	2023	2027
48	Kaina Tanimura	(Japan)	5 March 1998 (age 28)	(Japan) Iwaki FC	2025	
Players who are on loan to other club
37	Eitaro Matsuda	(Japan)	20 May 2001 (age 24)	(Japan) Albirex Niigata	2021	2025
42	Kohei Mochizuki	(Japan)	7 June 2006 (age 19)	Youth Team	2023	
Players who left during mid-season
1	William Popp	(Japan) (United States)	21 October 1994 (age 31)	(Japan) FC Machida Zelvia	2024	2024
2	Katsuya Nagato	(Japan)	15 January 1995 (age 31)	(Japan) Kashima Antlers	2022	
7	Élber	(Brazil)	27 May 1992 (age 33)	(Brazil) Bahia	2021	
10	Anderson Lopes	(Brazil)	15 September 1993 (age 32)	(China) Wuhan	2023	
11	Yan Matheus	(Brazil)	4 September 1998 (age 27)	(Brazil) Palmeiras	2022	
15	Sandy Walsh	(Indonesia) (Belgium)	14 March 1995 (age 31)	(Belgium) KV Mechelen	2025	2027
47	Kazuya Yamamura	(Japan)	2 December 1989 (age 36)	(Japan) Kawasaki Frontale	2024	

== Club official ==
Position	Name
Manager	(England) Steve Holland
Assistant manager	(Japan) Ryo Adachi (Japan) Hideo Oshima (Australia) Patrick Kisnorbo
Fitness coach	(Japan) Tomoo Tsukoshi
Goalkeeper coach	(Japan) Shigetatsu Matsunaga
Assistant goalkeeper coach	(Japan) Tetsuya Enomoto
Conditioning coach	(Japan) Yusuke Tanaka
Chief analyst	(Japan) Satoru Okada
Analyst	(Japan) Jun Yamaguchi
Performance data analyst	(Japan) Yuki Masui

== Transfers ==
=== Pre-season ===
==== In ====
Transfers in

Date	Position	Player	Transferred from	Ref
Permanent Transfer
31 Dececmber 2024	DF	(Japan) Eitaro Matsuda	(Japan) Albirex Niigata	End of loan
31 Dececmber 2024	MF	(Japan) Takuto Kimura	(Japan) Ventforet Kofu	End of loan
31 Dececmber 2024	DF	(Japan) Manato Yoshida	(Japan) Oita Trinita	End of loan (Note: Manato Yoshida's loan extended for another season.)
31 Dececmber 2024	DF	(Japan) Yuki Saneto	(Japan) Vegalta Sendai	End of loan (Note: Yuki Saneto move to Vegalta Sendai permanently.)
31 Dececmber 2024	MF	(Japan) Yusuke Nishida	(Japan) Nagano Parceiro	End of loan (Note: Yusuke Nishida released after his contract ended.)
31 Dececmber 2024	MF	(Japan) Keita Ueda	(Japan) SC Sagamihara	End of loan (Note: Keita Ueda move to Kataller Toyama permanently.)
31 Dececmber 2024	FW	(Japan) Kaina Yoshio	(South Korea) Jeju United	End of loan (Note: Kaina Yoshio was released after returning to the club.)
31 Dececmber 2024	FW	(Japan) Yuhi Murakami	(Japan) Tokushima Vortis	End of loan (Note: Yuhi Murakami moved to Ehime FC on loan for new season.)
25 November 2024	GK	(Japan) Ryoya Kimura	(Japan) Nihon University	Free
13 Dececmber 2024	GK	(Japan) (South Korea) Park Il-gyu	(Japan) Sagan Tosu	Free
20 Dececmber 2024	FW	(Japan) Daiya Tono	(Japan) Kawasaki Frontale	Free
27 Dececmber 2024	MF	(Japan) Toichi Suzuki	(Japan) Kyoto Sanga	Free
11 January 2025	DF	(Colombia) Jason Quinones	(Colombia) Águilas Doradas	Free
21 January 2025	DF	(Australia) (Kenya) Thomas Deng	(Japan) Albirex Niigata	Free
30 January 2025	DF	(Japan) Kosei Suwama	(Japan) Tsukuba University	Free
9 February 2025	DF	(Indonesia) (Belgium) Sandy Walsh	(Belgium) K.V. Mechelen	Free
Loan Transfer

==== Out ====
Transfers out

Date	Position	Player	Transferred To	Ref
Permanent Transfer
12 December 2024	DF	(Japan) Takumi Kamijima	(Japan) Avispa Fukuoka	Free
18 December 2024	DF	(Japan) Ryuta Koike	(Japan) Kashima Antlers	Free
18 December 2024	DF	(Japan) Yuki Saneto	(Japan) Vegalta Sendai	Undisclosed
19 December 2024	MF	(Japan) Yusuke Nishida	(Japan) YSCC Yokohama	Free
23 December 2024	GK	(Japan) Fuma Shirasaka	(Japan) Ehime FC	Free
23 December 2024	GK	(Japan) Riku Terakado	(Japan) Montedio Yamagata	Free
23 December 2024	DF	(Brazil) Eduardo	(Japan) V-Varen Nagasaki	Free
23 December 2024	FW	(Japan) Kaina Yoshio	(Japan) Montedio Yamagata	Free
24 December 2024	DF	(Japan) Yuta Koike	(Japan) Vissel Kobe	Free
24 December 2024	MF	(Japan) Keita Ueda	(Japan) Kataller Toyama	Free
25 December 2024	FW	(Japan) Takuma Nishimura	(Japan) FC Machida Zelvia	Free
28 December 2024	DF	(Japan) Shinnosuke Hatanaka	(Japan) Cerezo Osaka	Free
31 Dececmber 2024	DF	(Japan) (United States) Justin Homma	(Japan) Vissel Kobe	End of loan
4 January 2025	MF	(Japan) Keigo Sakakibara	(Japan) Oita Trinita	Free
8 January 2025	DF	(Japan) Hijiri Kato	(Japan) Fagiano Okayama	Free
10 January 2025	MF	(Japan) Kota Mizunuma	(Australia) Newcastle Jets	Free
Loan Transfer
18 December 2024	FW	(Japan) Yuhi Murakami	(Japan) Ehime FC	Season loan
28 December 2024	DF	(Japan) Manato Yoshida	(Japan) Oita Trinita	Season loan
5 January 2025	GK	(Japan) Tomoki Tagawa	(Japan) Kataller Toyama	Season loan
14 March 2025	DF	(Japan) Eitaro Matsuda	(Japan) Sagan Tosu	Season loan till 31 Jan 2026

=== Mid-season ===
==== In ====
Transfers in

Date	Position	Player	Transferred from	Ref
Permanent Transfer
6 July 2025	FW	(Japan) Kaina Tanimura	(Japan) Iwaki FC	Undisclosed
8 July 2025	FW	(Brazil) Yuri Araujo	(Portugal) Viseu	Undisclosed
12 July 2025	FW	(Israel) Dean David	(Israel) Maccabi Haifa	Undisclosed
5 August 2025	DF	(Japan) Ryotaro Tsunoda	(England) Cardiff City	Undisclosed
20 August 2025	FW	(Belgium) Jordy Croux	(Japan) Júbilo Iwata	Undisclosed
20 August 2025	MF	(Japan) (Nigeria) George Onaiwu	(Japan) Vegalta Sendai	Undisclosed

==== Out ====
Transfers out

Date	Position	Player	Transferred To	Ref
Permanent Transfer
9 June 2025	DF	(Japan) Katsuya Nagato	(Japan) Vissel Kobe	Undisclosed
1 July 2025	GK	(Japan) (United States) William Popp	(Japan) Shonan Bellmare	Undisclosed
17 July 2025	FW	(Brazil) Anderson Lopes	(Singapore) Lion City Sailors	Undisclosed
12 August 2025	FW	(Brazil) Élber	(Japan) Kashima Antlers	Undisclosed
15 August 2025	DF	(Indonesia) (Belgium) Sandy Walsh	(Thailand) Buriram United	Free
28 August 2025	FW	(Brazil) Yan Matheus	Qatar SC	$5 million
1 September 2025	FW	(Japan) Kazuya Yamamura	(Australia) Wollongong Wolves	Free
Loan Transfer
26 July 2025	MF	(Japan) Kohei Mochizuki	(Japan) Tegevajaro Miyazaki	Season loan

== Friendly ==
=== Pre-season ===
Win Draw Loss

22 January 2025 1	Oita Trinita (Japan)	1–0	(Japan) Yokohama F. Marinos	Miyazaki, Japan
				Stadium: Amino Vital Training Center Miyazaki

26 January 2025 2	Roasso Kumamoto (Japan)	1–2	(Japan) Yokohama F. Marinos	Miyazaki, Japan
	35'		Tono Daiya 23'; Élber 89'	Stadium: Amino Vital Training Center Miyazaki

30 January 2025 3	Ventforet Kofu (Japan)	2–3	(Japan) Yokohama F. Marinos	Miyazaki, Japan
				Stadium: Amino Vital Training Center Miyazaki

=== Mid-season ===
30 July 2025 J.League World Challenge	Yokohama F. Marinos (Japan)	1–3	(England) Liverpool	Yokohama
	ᮅᮆᮔᮊ			Stadium: Nissan Stadium

== Competitions ==
=== J1 League ===
Pos	Team	Pld	W	D	L	GF	GA	GD	Pts
13	Fagiano Okayama	38	12	9	17	33	42	−9	45
14	Shimizu S-Pulse	38	11	11	16	41	51	−10	44
15	Yokohama F. Marinos	38	12	7	19	46	47	−1	43
16	Nagoya Grampus	38	11	10	17	44	56	−12	43
17	Tokyo Verdy	38	11	10	17	23	41	−18	43

Source: JLeague.co, JLeague.jp, J.League Data Site
Rules for classification: 1) Points; 2) Goal difference; 3) Goals scored; 4) Head-to-head points; 5) Head-to-head goal difference; 6) Head-to-head goals scored; 7) Fewer disciplinary points.

==== Matches ====
15 February 1	Yokohama F. Marinos	1–1	Albirex Niigata	Yokohama
	Anderson Lopes 77' (pen.)	Report	Shusuke Ota 26'; Ryuga Tashiro (yellow card) 71'	Stadium: Nissan Stadium; Attendance: 32,713; Referee: Koichiro Fukushima

23 February 2	Sanfrecce Hiroshima	1–0	Yokohama F. Marinos	Hiroshima
	Ryo Germain 49' (pen.); Hayao Kawabe (yellow card) 90+5'	Report	Steve Walsh (yellow card) 11'; Kodjo Aziangbe (yellow card) 19'	Stadium: Edion Peace Wing Hiroshima; Attendance: 27,123; Referee: Ryo Tanimoto

26 February 3	Yokohama F. Marinos	0–0	Yokohama FC	Yokohama
	Yan Matheus (yellow card) 74'; Kodjo Aziangbe (yellow card) 85'	Report	Yoshiaki Komai (yellow card) 23'; Akito Fukumori (yellow card) 49'	Stadium: Nissan Stadium; Attendance: 17,115; Referee: Yusuke Araki

1 March 4	Yokohama F. Marinos	1–1	Shonan Bellmare	Yokohama
	Asahi Uenaka 38'	Report	Hisatsugu Ishii 55'; Yuto Suzuki (yellow card) 16'; Tomoya Fujii (yellow card) 52'	Stadium: Nissan Stadium; Attendance: 25,561; Referee: Yoshiro Imamura

16 March 6	Yokohama F. Marinos	2–0	Gamba Osaka	Yokohama
	Daiya Tono 20'; Asahi Uenaka 75'; Park Il-gyu (yellow card) 68'; Kenta Inoue (yellow card) 88'	Report	Shu Kurata (yellow card) 35'	Stadium: Nissan Stadium; Attendance: 23,169; Referee: Nathan Verboomen (Belgium)

29 March 7	Fagiano Okayama	1–0	Yokohama F. Marinos	Okayama
	Lucão 67'	Report	Jeison Quiñónes (yellow card) 25'; Daiya Tono (yellow card) 82'	Stadium: City Light Stadium; Attendance: 14,892; Referee: Yusuke Ohashi

2 April 8	Nagoya Grampus	2–0	Yokohama F. Marinos	Toyota
	Akinari Kawazura 51'; Yota Sato 84'	Report		Stadium: Toyota Stadium; Attendance: 21,892; Referee: Koji Takasaki

5 April 9	Yokohama F. Marinos	0–0	Tokyo Verdy	Yokohama
	Kenta Inoue (yellow card) 45+4'; Jean Claude (yellow card) 69'	Report	Yuya Fukuda (yellow card) 3'; Kasuke Saito (yellow card) 17'; Rei Hirakawa (yellow card) 54'	Stadium: Nissan Stadium; Attendance: 24,170; Referee: Yudai Yamamoto

9 April 5 (Rescheduled)	Kawasaki Frontale	3–3	Yokohama F. Marinos	Kawasaki
	Yuto Ozeki 7' (yellow card) 76'; César Haydar 67'; Kota Takai 90+10'	Report	Yan Matheus 41', 90+2'; Jun Amano 89'; Jean Claude (yellow card) 79'	Stadium: Kawasaki Todoroki Stadium; Attendance: 21,478; Referee: Takafumi Mikuriya

12 April 10	Avispa Fukuoka	2–1	Yokohama F. Marinos	Fukuoka
	Kazuki Fujimoto 37'; Tomoya Miki 81'; Masaya Tashiro (yellow card) 24'	Report	Daiya Tono 11'; Ken Matsubara (yellow card) 42'	Stadium: Best Denki Stadium; Attendance: 8,255; Referee: Jumpei Iida

16 April 11	Yokohama F. Marinos	2–3	Shimizu S-Pulse	Yokohama
	Daiya Tono 29'; Asahi Uenaka 51'; Jun Amano 86'; Thomas Deng (yellow card) 90+1'	Report	Hikaru Nakahara 54'; Kodjo Aziangbe 70' (o.g.); Masaki Yumiba 88'; Capixaba (yellow card) 90+2'	Stadium: Nissan Stadium; Attendance: 16,785; Referee: Akihiko Ikeuchi

20 April 12	Urawa Red Diamonds	3–1	Yokohama F. Marinos	Saitama
	Matheus Sávio 45+8'; Ryoma Watanabe 46'; Kenta Inoue	Report	Riku Yamane 59'	Stadium: Saitama Stadium 2002; Attendance: 41,981; Referee: Futoshi Nakamura

11 May 13	Cerezo Osaka	1–0	Yokohama F. Marinos	Osaka
	Rafael Ratao 24'; Shinji Kagawa (yellow card) 41'; Kengo Furuyama (yellow card) 90+2'	Report	Kenta Inoue (yellow card) 8'; Asahi Uenaka (yellow card) 65'	Stadium: Yodoko Sakura Stadium; Attendance: 18,797; Referee: Hiroki Kasahara

14 May 14	Yokohama F. Marinos	0–2	Kashiwa Reysol	Yokohama
	Kosei Suwama (yellow card) 73'; Takuya Kida (yellow card) 90'	Report	Yoshio Koizumi 56'; Kosuke Kinoshita 90+1'	Stadium: Nissan Stadium; Attendance: 14,513; Referee: Koki Nagamine

17 May 15	Yokohama F. Marinos	0–3	Kyoto Sanga	Yokohama
	Jun Amano (yellow card) 54'; Anderson Lopes (yellow card) 69'	Report	Temma Matsuda 31'; Masaya Okugawa 67'; Shimpei Fukuoka 81' (yellow card) 54'; Kyo Sato (yellow card) 12'	Stadium: Nissan Stadium; Attendance: 20,786; Referee: Martin Petersen (Germany)

21 May 16	Yokohama F. Marinos	1–2	Vissel Kobe	Yokohama
	Takuya Kida 43' (yellow card) 68'	Report	Erik 19'; Yuya Osako 51'	Stadium: Nissan Stadium; Attendance: 15,373; Referee: Futoshi Nakamura

25 May 17	Yokohama F. Marinos	3–1	Kashima Antlers	Yokohama
	Katsuya Nagato 4'; Yan Matheus 13', 27'; Asahi Uenaka (yellow card) 25'; Toichi Suzuki (yellow card) 90+2'	Report	Leo Ceara 36'; Koki Anzai (yellow card) 69'	Stadium: Nissan Stadium; Attendance: 32,443; Referee: Koichiro Fukushima

31 May 18	Machida Zelvia	0–3	Yokohama F. Marinos	Tokyo
		Report	Daiya Tono 23', 27' (yellow card) 90+1'; Hiroyuki Mae 90+4' (o.g)	Stadium: Japan National Stadium; Attendance: 10,289; Referee: Fu Ming (China)

15 June 19	Albirex Niigata	1–0	Yokohama F. Marinos	Niigata
	Danilo Gomes 73'; Michael Fitzgerald (yellow card) 45+2'	Report	Daiya Tono (yellow card) 40'	Stadium: Denka Big Swan Stadium; Attendance: 30,474; Referee: Takafumi Mikuriya

21 June 20	Yokohama F. Marinos	0–1	Fagiano Okayama	Yokohama
		Report	Lucao 17'; Masaya Matsumoto (yellow card) 45+6'; Ryo Takeuchi (yellow card) 71'	Stadium: Nissan Stadium; Attendance: 29,282; Referee: Jumpei Iida

25 June 21	Yokohama F. Marinos	0–3	FC Tokyo	Yokohama
	Taiki Watanabe (yellow card) 55'; Takuya Kida (yellow card) 61'	Report	Leon Nozawa 51'; Kein Sato 68'; Motoki Nagakura 85'	Stadium: Nissan Stadium; Attendance: 19,244; Referee: Łukasz Kuźma (Poland)

28 June 22	Shonan Bellmare	1–1	Yokohama F. Marinos	Hiratsuka
	Taiyo Hiraoka 41'; Akito Suzuki (yellow card) 66'	Report	Elber 61'; Kento Inoue (yellow card) 67'; Toichi Suzuki (yellow card) 86'	Stadium: Lemon Gas Stadium Hiratsuka; Attendance: 13,031; Referee: Yoshimi Yamashita

5 July 23	Yokohama FC	0–1	Yokohama F. Marinos	Yokohama
	Solomon Sakuragawa (yellow card) 64'; Akinori Ichikawa (yellow card) 76'; Makito Ito (yellow card) 81'	Report	Anderson Lopes 77' (pen.); Elber (yellow card) 64'; Takuya Kida (yellow card) 67'	Stadium: Mitsuzawa Stadium; Attendance: 13,300; Referee: Hiroki Kasahara

20 July 24	Yokohama F. Marinos	3–0	Nagoya Grampus	Yokohama
	Kaina Tanimura 35'; Yan Matheus 45'; Asahi Uenaka 90+5'; Jeison Quiñónes (yellow card) 13'; Kodjo Aziangbe (yellow card) 63'; Tōichi Suzuki (yellow card) 90+6'	Report	Kasper Junker (yellow card) 86'	Stadium: Nissan Stadium; Attendance: 32,113; Referee: Masuya Ueda

9 August 25	Tokyo Verdy	1–0	Yokohama F. Marinos	Chōfu
	Hiroto Taniguchi 62'; Yuan Matsuhashi (yellow card) 54'	Report	Ken Matsubara (yellow card) 19'; Toichi Suzuki (yellow card) 37'; Kota Watanabe (yellow card) 73'	Stadium: Ajinomoto Stadium; Attendance: 26,902; Referee: Futoshi Nakamura

16 August 26	Shimizu S-Pulse	1–3	Yokohama F. Marinos	Shizuoka
	Koya Kitagawa 90'; Matheus Bueno (yellow card) 84'; Reon Yamahara (yellow card) 90+4'	Report	Ryotaro Tsunoda 16'; Dean David 29'; Kaina Tanimura 80'; Ryo Miyaichi (yellow card) 3'; Kota Watanabe (yellow card) 23'; Ren Kato (yellow card) 67'; Riku Yamane (yellow card) 70'; Kenta Inoue (yellow card) 84'	Stadium: IAI Stadium Nihondaira; Attendance: 18,198; Referee: Masuya Ueda

23 August 27	Yokohama F. Marinos	0–0	Machida Zelvia	Yokohama
	Asahi Uenaka (yellow card) 40'	Report	Mitchell Duke (yellow card) 57'; Yuki Soma (yellow card) 81'; Daihachi Okamura (yellow card) 90+5'	Stadium: Nissan Stadium; Attendance: 32,188; Referee: Takafumi Mikuriya

30 August 28	Vissel Kobe	1–0	Yokohama F. Marinos	Kobe
	Yoshinori Muto 37'; Erik (yellow card) 33'	Report	Ryo Miyaichi (yellow card) 22'; Takuya Kida (yellow card) 65'; Toichi Suzuki (yellow card) 72'	Stadium: Noevir Stadium Kobe; Attendance: 23,198; Referee: Yudai Yamamoto

13 September 29	Yokohama F. Marinos	0–3	Kawasaki Frontale	Yokohama
	Takuya Kida (yellow card) 28'; Ryotaro Tsunoda (yellow card) 53'; Tōichi Suzuki (red card) 60'; Ryō Miyaichi (yellow card) 82'	Report	Tatsuya Ito 4'; Erison 62' (pen.); Ten Miyagi 90+8'	Stadium: Nissan Stadium; Attendance: 41,221; Referee: Yūsuke Ōhashi

20 September 30	Yokohama F. Marinos	2–0	Avispa Fukuoka	Yokohama
	Dean David 21'; Ryotaro Tsunoda 42'; Kenta Inoue (yellow card) 69'	Report	Shahab Zahedi (yellow card) 26'; Masato Yusawa (yellow card) 63'; Nassim Ben Khalifa (yellow card) 84'	Stadium: Nissan Stadium; Attendance: 21,840; Referee: Hiroki Kasahara

23 September 31	Gamba Osaka	3–1	Yokohama F. Marinos	Osaka
	Makoto Mitsuta 65'; Deniz Hummet 70'; Takashi Usami 79'; Takanori Okai (yellow card) 75'	Report	Jun Amano 60'; Thomas Deng (yellow card) 90+1'	Stadium: Suita City Football Stadium; Attendance: 27,934; Referee: Keigo Sendachi

28 September 32	FC Tokyo	1–3	Yokohama F. Marinos	Chofu
	Takahiro Ko 89'; Yuto Nagamoto (yellow card) 65'; Keita Endo (yellow card) 80'	Report	Takuya Kida 51'; Kaina Tanimura 59', 62' (yellow card) 34'; Jordy Croux (yellow card) 20'	Stadium: Ajinomoto Stadium; Attendance: 33,460; Referee: Koei Koya

4 October 33	Kashiwa Reysol	1–0	Yokohama F. Marinos	Chiba
	Yoshio Koizumi 41'; Hayato Nakama (yellow card) 45+2'	Report		Stadium: Sankyo Frontier Kashiwa Stadium; Attendance: 13,884; Referee: Koji Takasaki

18 October 34	Yokohama F. Marinos	4–0	Urawa Red Diamonds	Yokohama
	Kaina Tanimura 6'; Jeison Quiñónes 34'; Jordy Croux 45' (pen.); Asahi Uenaka 45+5'; Jean Claude (yellow card) 88'	Report	Matheus Savio (yellow card) 48'; Ryoma Watanabe (yellow card) 58'; Danilo Boza (yellow card) 68'; Isaac Kiese Thelin (yellow card) 82'; Takuro Kaneko (red card) 90+1'; Hiroki Abe (yellow card) 90+2'	Stadium: Nissan Stadium; Attendance: 36,442; Referee: Hiroki Kasahara

25 October 35	Yokohama F. Marinos	3–0	Sanfrecce Hiroshima	Yokohama
	Asahi Uenaka 12'; Jun Amano 86'; Jeison Quiñónes 90+1' (yellow card) 72'; Yuri (yellow card) 80'; Toichi Suzuki (yellow card) 87'	Report		Stadium: Nissan Stadium; Attendance: Jumpei Iida; Referee: 27,356

9 November 36	Kyoto Sanga	0–3	Yokohama F. Marinos	Kyoto
		Report	Kaina Tanimura 36'; Jun Amano 72' (yellow card) 76'; Asahi Uenaka 90+2'; Jeison Quiñónes (yellow card) 90+2'; Jean Claude (yellow card) 12'; Toichi Suzuki (yellow card) 58'	Stadium: Sanga Stadium by Kyocera; Attendance: 19,828; Referee: Koki Nagamine

30 November 37	Yokohama F. Marinos	3–1	Cerezo Osaka	Yokohama
	Asahi Uenaka 26'; Dean David 90+6'; Ryoya Kimura (yellow card) 45+3'; Thomas Deng (yellow card) 68'; Jean Claude (yellow card) 90+5'	Report	Rafael Ratao 45+3' (pen.); Niko Takahashi (yellow card) 45+5' (yellow-red card)	Stadium: Nissan Stadium; Attendance: 42,665

6 December 38	Kashima Antlers	2–1	Yokohama F. Marinos	Tokyo
	Leo Ceara 20', 56' (yellow card) 58'; Yuma Suzuki (yellow card) 26'	Report	Jun Amano 90+1'; Jeison Quinones (yellow card) 26'; Asahi Uenaka (yellow card) 36'; Kanta Sekitomi (yellow card) 63'; Ryotaro Tsunoda (yellow card) 80'; Jordy Croux (yellow card) 90+5'	Stadium: Japan National Stadium; Attendance: 37,079; Referee: Hiroyuki Kimura

=== J.League Cup ===
The 2025 J.League Cup was expanded so that all 60 J.League clubs would participate.

3 September Prime round QF Leg 1	Yokohama F. Marinos	1–4	Kashiwa Reysol	Yokohama
	Asahi Uenaka 90+3'; Kenta Inoue (yellow card) 30'; Ren Kato (yellow card) 36'	Report	Diego 18'; Yusuke Segawa 53'; Yuki Kakita 70', 90+8'; Nobuteru Nakagawa (yellow card) 54'; Keita Inoue (yellow card) 68'	Stadium: Nissan Stadium; Attendance: 9,656; Referee: Akihiko Ikeuchi

7 September Prime round QF Leg 2	Kashiwa Reysol	1–0 (5–1 agg.)	Yokohama F. Marinos	Kashiwa
	Sachiro Toshima 90+3'; Nobuteru Nakagawa (yellow card) 68'; Hayato Nakata (yellow card) 84'	Report	Toichi Suzuki (yellow card) 5'; Riku Yamane (yellow card) 29'; eison Quiñónes (yellow card) 53'; Jun Amano (yellow card) 75'	Stadium: Sankyo Frontier Kashiwa Stadium; Attendance: 11,682; Referee: Futoshi Nakamura

=== Emperor's Cup ===
11 June Round 2	Yokohama F. Marinos	0–2	ReinMeer Aomori	Yokohama
	Kenta Inoue (yellow card) 72'	Report	Riku Hirosue 37'; Luiz Fernando da Silva 45+1'; Riku Tamura (yellow card) 58'	Stadium: Nissan Stadium; Attendance: 4,964; Referee: Shū Kawamata

=== 2024–25 AFC Champions League Elite ===
Pos	Team	Pld	W	D	L	GF	GA	GD	Pts	Qualification
1	(Japan) Yokohama F. Marinos	7	6	0	1	21	7	+14	18	Advance to round of 16
2	(Japan) Kawasaki Frontale	7	5	0	2	13	4	+9	15	Advance to round of 16
3	(Malaysia) Johor Darul Ta'zim	7	4	2	1	16	8	+8	14	Advance to round of 16
4	(South Korea) Gwangju	7	4	2	1	15	9	+6	14	Advance to round of 16
5	(Japan) Vissel Kobe	7	4	1	2	14	9	+5	13	Advance to round of 16

Source: Asian Football Confederation
Rules for classification: 1) points; 2) goal difference; 3) number of goals scored; 4) number of matches won; 5) penalty shoot-out if only two teams remain tied and played each other on the final matchday 6) fair play ranking; 7) drawing of lots

Win Draw Loss

==== League stage ====
8 February 2025 Matchday 7	Yokohama F. Marinos (Japan)	1–0	(China) Shanghai Shenhua	Yokohama, Japan
	Yan Matheus 20'; Asahi Uenaka (yellow card) 61'; Ken Matsubara (yellow card) 66'	Report	Ibrahim Amadou (yellow card) 26'	Stadium: International Stadium Yokohama; Attendance: 11,626; Referee: Mooud Bonyadifard (Iran)

19 February 2025 Matchday 8	Shanghai Port (China)	0–2	(Japan) Yokohama F. Marinos	Shanghai, China
19:00 UTC+9	Matheus Jussa (yellow card) 38'; Wang Zhen'ao (yellow card) 51'	Report	Asahi Uenaka 64'; Jun Amano 69'; Anderson Lopes (yellow card) 40'	Stadium: Pudong Football Stadium; Attendance: 12,398; Referee: Hanna Hattab (Syria)

==== Knockout stage ====
4 March 2025 R16 Leg 1	Shanghai Port (China)	0–1	(Japan) Yokohama F. Marinos	Shanghai, China
	Mateus Vital (yellow card) 14'; Li Ang (yellow card) 28'; Yang Shiyuan (yellow card) 41'; Ablahan Haliq (yellow card) 78'	Report	Anderson Lopes 30'	Stadium: Pudong Football Stadium; Attendance: 10,860; Referee: Kim Jong-hyeok (South Korea)

11 March 2025 R16 Leg 2	Yokohama F. Marinos (Japan)	4–1 (5–1 agg.)	(China) Shanghai Port	Yokohama, Japan
	Daiya Tono 3'; Anderson Lopes 30', 56'; Yan Matheus 44'; Jun Amano (yellow card) 82'; Ryo Miyaichi (yellow card) 84'	Report	Leonardo 35'; Matheus Jussa (yellow card) 45+2'; Xu Xin (yellow card) 48'; Feng Jin (yellow card) 90+1'	Stadium: International Stadium Yokohama; Referee: Khalid Saleh Al-Turais (Saudi Arabia)

26 April 2025 Quarter Final	Yokohama F. Marinos (Japan)	1–4	(Saudi Arabia) Al Nassr	Jeddah, Saudi Arabia
	Kota Watanabe 53' (yellow card) 15' (yellow-red card) 74'; Riku Yamane (yellow card) 57'	Report	Jhon Durán 27', 49'; Sadio Mané 31'; Cristiano Ronaldo 38'	Stadium: Prince Abdullah Al-Faisal Sports City; Referee: Adel Al-Naqbi (United Arab Emirates)

== Team statistics ==
=== Appearances and goals ===
As of 6 December 2025

No.	Pos.	Player	J1 League		Emperor's Cup		J.League Cup		2024–25 AFC Champions League Elite		Total	
No.	Pos.	Player	Apps	Goals	Apps	Goals	Apps	Goals	Apps	Goals	Apps	Goals
6	MF	(Japan) Kota Watanabe	19+10	0	1	0	1+1	0	0+5	1	37	1
8	MF	(Japan) Takuya Kida	23+2	1	0	0	1+1	0	1+1	0	29	1
9	FW	(Japan) Daiya Tono	16+4	5	0+1	0	0	0	3	1	24	6
13	DF	(Colombia) Jeison Quiñónes	22	2	0	0	1	0	4	0	27	2
14	FW	(Japan) Asahi Uenaka	26+6	8	0	0	1+1	1	5	1	38	10
16	DF	(Japan) Ren Kato	22+4	0	0+1	0	2	0	1	0	30	0
17	MF	(Japan) Kenta Inoue	15+13	0	1	0	2	0	1+4	0	36	0
18	MF	(Japan) (Nigeria) George Onaiwu	1+3	0	0	0	1	0	0	0	5	0
19	GK	(Japan) Park Il-gyu	27	0	1	0	0	0	5	0	33	0
20	MF	(Japan) Jun Amano	10+22	4	1	0	1+1	0	1+3	1	38	5
21	GK	(Japan) Hiroki Iikura	10	0	0	0	2	0	0+1	0	13	0
22	DF	(Japan) Ryotaro Tsunoda	9+1	2	0	0	0	0	0	0	10	2
23	FW	(Japan) Ryo Miyaichi	12+10	0	0	0	0+2	0	2	0	26	0
25	MF	(Japan) Toichi Suzuki	14+9	0	1	0	2	0	1	0	27	0
26	FW	(Israel) Dean David	3+6	3	0	0	2	0	0	0	11	3
27	DF	(Japan) Ken Matsubara	19+3	0	0+1	0	0	0	3	0	26	0
28	MF	(Japan) Riku Yamane	19+8	1	1	0	2	0	4+1	0	35	1
30	FW	(Brazil) Yuri Araujo	3+6	0	0	0	0+2	0	0	0	11	0
31	GK	(Japan) Ryoya Kimura	1	0	0	0	0	0	0	0	1	0
33	DF	(Japan) Kosei Suwama	9+3	0	0	0	2	0	1	0	15	0
34	MF	(Japan) Takuto Kimura	0+1	0	0	0	0	0	0+1	0	2	0
35	MF	(Japan) Kanta Sekitomi	3+1	0	0	0	0	0	0	0	4	0
37	FW	(Belgium) Jordy Croux	9+1	1	0	0	1+1	0	0	0	12	1
39	DF	(Japan) Taiki Watanabe	7+3	0	1	0	0	0	1	0	12	0
41	MF	(Japan) Kosuke Matsumura	0+7	0	0	0	1	0	0	0	8	0
43	DF	(Japan) Reno Noguchi	0	0	0	0	0	0	0	0	0	0
44	DF	(Australia) (Kenya) Thomas Deng	18+3	0	0+1	0	0	0	1	0	23	0
45	MF	(Togo) Kodjo Aziangbe	14+7	0	0	0	0	0	5	0	26	0
46	MF	(Japan) Hiroto Asada	0+1	0	0	0	0	0	0+1	0	2	0
48	FW	(Japan) Kaina Tanimura	10+3	4	0	0	0+1	0	0	0	14	4
49	MF	(Japan) Kaiki Kato	0	0	0+1	0	0	0	0	0	1	0
Players featured on a match for the team, but left the club mid-season, either permanently or on loan transfer
1	GK	(Japan) (United States) William Popp	0	0	0	0	0	0	0	0	0	0
2	DF	(Japan) Katsuya Nagato	15+2	1	0	0	0	0	4+1	0	22	1
7	FW	(Brazil) Élber	7+10	1	1	0	0	0	0+4	0	22	1
10	FW	(Brazil) Anderson Lopes	20	2	0	0	0	0	4+1	3	25	5
11	FW	(Brazil) Yan Matheus	20+4	4	0	0	0	0	5	2	29	6
15	DF	(Indonesia) (Belgium) Sandy Walsh	5+3	0	1	0	0	0	3	0	12	0
42	FW	(Japan) Kohei Mochizuki	0	0	1	0	0	0	0	0	1	0
47	DF	(Japan) Kazuya Yamamura	0+5	0	1	0	0	0	0	0	6	0
