= 2022 Yokohama F. Marinos season =

Yokohama F. Marinos
2022 season
- Chairman: Ryōji Kurosawa
- Manager: Kevin Muscat
- Stadium: Nissan Stadium
- J1 League: Champions (5th J1 title; 7th D1 title)
- Emperor's Cup: Third round
- J.League Cup: Quarter-finals
- AFC Champions League: Round of 16
- Top goalscorer: League: Léo Ceará (11); All: Léo Ceará (16)
- Highest home attendance: 32,516 (vs Gamba Osaka, 8 October 2022, J1 League)
- Lowest home attendance: 7,355 (vs Kyoto Sanga, 25 May 2022, J1 League)
- Average home league attendance: 19,940
- Biggest win: 5–3 (vs Shimizu S-Pulse (A), 2 July 2022, J1 League)
- Biggest defeat: 1–3 (vs Kashiwa Reysol (A), 27 February 2022, J1 League); 1–3 (vs Sanfrecce Hiroshima (A), 3 August 2022, J.League Cup)
| Home colours | Away colours |
- All statistics correct as of 12 October 2022.

The 2022 Yokohama F. Marinos season was the club's 50th season in existence and the 40th consecutive season in the top flight of Japanese football. In addition to the domestic league, Yokohama F. Marinos participated in this season's editions of the Emperor's Cup, the J.League Cup and the AFC Champions League.

== Players ==
=== First-team squad ===
As of 1 September 2022

Note: Flags indicate national team as defined under FIFA eligibility rules; some limited exceptions apply. Players may hold more than one non-FIFA nationality.

| No. | Pos. | Nation | Player |
|---|---|---|---|
| 1 | GK | JPN | Yohei Takaoka |
| 2 | DF | JPN | Katsuya Nagato |
| 4 | DF | JPN | Shinnosuke Hatanaka |
| 5 | DF | BRA | Eduardo |
| 6 | MF | JPN | Kota Watanabe |
| 7 | MF | BRA | Élber |
| 8 | MF | JPN | Takuya Kida (captain) |
| 9 | FW | BRA | Léo Ceará |
| 10 | MF | BRA | Marcos Júnior |
| 11 | FW | BRA | Anderson Lopes |
| 14 | MF | JPN | Kaina Yoshio |
| 16 | MF | JPN | Joel Chima Fujita |
| 17 | MF | JPN | Ryo Miyaichi |
| 18 | MF | JPN | Kota Mizunuma |
| 19 | DF | JPN | Yuki Saneto |
| 20 | MF | BRA | Yan Mateus |
| 23 | FW | JPN | Teruhito Nakagawa |

| No. | Pos. | Nation | Player |
|---|---|---|---|
| 24 | DF | JPN | Tomoki Iwata |
| 25 | DF | JPN | Ryuta Koike |
| 26 | DF | JPN | Yuta Koike |
| 27 | DF | JPN | Ken Matsubara |
| 28 | MF | JPN | Riku Yamane |
| 30 | FW | JPN | Takuma Nishimura |
| 32 | GK | JPN | Tomoki Tagawa |
| 33 | DF | JPN | Ryotaro Tsunoda |
| 34 | GK | JPN | Hirotsugu Nakabayashi |
| 36 | DF | JPN | Yusuke Nishida |
| 44 | MF | JPN | Takuto Kimura ^{DSP} |
| 45 | FW | JPN | Yuhi Murakami ^{DSP} |
| 46 | MF | JPN | Kosuke Matsumura ^{Type 2} |
| 47 | MF | JPN | Haruto Shimada ^{Type 2} |
| 48 | FW | JPN | Kotaro Uchino ^{Type 2} |
| 49 | DF | JPN | Yuma Hatano ^{Type 2} |
| 50 | GK | JPN | Powell Obinna Obi |

=== Out on loan ===
Note: Flags indicate national team as defined under FIFA eligibility rules; some limited exceptions apply. Players may hold more than one non-FIFA nationality.

| No. | Pos. | Nation | Player |
|---|---|---|---|
| 29 | DF | JPN | Ko Ikeda (on loan to Maruyasu Okazaki) |
| 35 | FW | JPN | Ryonosuke Kabayama (on loan to Montedio Yamagata) |
| 39 | FW | JPN | Talla Ndao (on loan to Maruyasu Okazaki) |
| — | GK | JPN | Riku Terakado (on loan to Renofa Yamaguchi) |
| — | GK | JPN | Shunsuke Hirai (on loan to ReinMeer Aomori) |
| — | MF | JPN | Eitaro Matsuda (on loan to Albirex Niigata) |
| — | MF | JPN | Keigo Sakakibara (on loan to ReinMeer Aomori) |

| No. | Pos. | Nation | Player |
|---|---|---|---|
| — | MF | JPN | Takuto Minami (on loan to Iwate Grulla Morioka) |
| — | MF | JPN | Jun Amano (on loan to Ulsan Hyundai) |
| — | MF | JPN | Naoki Tsubaki (on loan to Mito HollyHock) |
| — | MF | JPN | Keita Ueda (on loan to Tochigi SC) |
| — | FW | JPN | Takumi Tsukui (on loan to ReinMeer Aomori) |
| — | FW | JPN | Yushi Yamaya (on loan to Yokohama FC) |

== Pre-season and friendlies ==
Win Draw Loss Fixtures

| 28 November 2022 EuroJapan Cup | Yokohama F. Marinos (Japan) | 3–3 | (Italy) AS Roma | Tokyo |
| 19:30 JST (UTC+9) | Eduardo 9'; Nishimura 45'; Matsubara 72' | Report | Zaniolo 69'; Ibañez 84'; Shomurodov 90+2' | Stadium: Japan National Stadium |

== Competitions ==
=== Overall record ===
| Competition | First match | Last match | Starting round | Final position | Record | | | | | | | |
| Competition | First match | Last match | Starting round | Final position | Pld | W | D | L | GF | GA | GD | Win % |
|---|---|---|---|---|---|---|---|---|---|---|---|---|
| J1 League | 19 February 2022 | 5 November 2022 | Matchday 1 | Winners | 34 | 20 | 8 | 6 | 70 | 35 | +35 | 58.82 |
| Emperor's Cup | 1 June 2022 | 22 June 2022 | Second round | Third round | 2 | 1 | 0 | 1 | 3 | 2 | +1 | 50.00 |
| J.League Cup | 3 August 2022 | 10 August 2022 | Quarter-finals | Quarter-finals | 2 | 0 | 0 | 2 | 1 | 5 | −4 | 0.00 |
| AFC Champions League | 15 April 2022 | 18 August 2022 | Group stage | Round of 16 | 7 | 4 | 1 | 2 | 11 | 6 | +5 | 57.14 |
| Total | | | | | 45 | 25 | 9 | 11 | 85 | 48 | +37 | 55.56 |

Source: Soccerway

=== J1 League ===
==== League table ====
| Pos | Team | Pld | W | D | L | GF | GA | GD | Pts | Qualification or relegation |
|---|---|---|---|---|---|---|---|---|---|---|
| 1 | Yokohama F. Marinos (C) | 34 | 20 | 8 | 6 | 70 | 35 | +35 | 68 | Qualification for the AFC Champions League group stage |
| 2 | Kawasaki Frontale | 34 | 20 | 6 | 8 | 65 | 42 | +23 | 66 | Qualification for the AFC Champions League group stage |
| 3 | Sanfrecce Hiroshima | 34 | 15 | 10 | 9 | 52 | 41 | +11 | 55 | |
| 4 | Kashima Antlers | 34 | 13 | 13 | 8 | 47 | 42 | +5 | 52 | |
| 5 | Cerezo Osaka | 34 | 13 | 12 | 9 | 46 | 40 | +6 | 51 | |

Source: J.League Data Site
Rules for classification: 1) Points; 2) Goal difference; 3) Goals scored; 4) Head-to-head points; 5) Head-to-head goal difference; 6) Head-to-head goals scored; 7) Fewer disciplinary points.
(C) Champions

==== Results summary ====
| Overall | | | | | | | | Home | | | | | | Away | | | | | |
| Pld | W | D | L | GF | GA | GD | Pts | W | D | L | GF | GA | GD | W | D | L | GF | GA | GD |
|---|---|---|---|---|---|---|---|---|---|---|---|---|---|---|---|---|---|---|---|
| 34 | 20 | 8 | 6 | 67 | 34 | +33 | 68 | 12 | 3 | 2 | 33 | 10 | +23 | 8 | 5 | 4 | 34 | 24 | +10 |

Last updated: 5 November 2022.
Source: Soccerway

==== Results by round ====
| Round | 1 | 2 | 3 | 4 | 5 | 6 | 7 | 8 | 9 | 10 | 11 | 12 | 13 | 14 | 15 | 16 | 17 | 18 | 19 | 20 | 21 | 22 | 23 | 24 | 25 | 26 | 27 | 28 | 29 | 30 | 31 | 32 | 33 | 34 |
|---|---|---|---|---|---|---|---|---|---|---|---|---|---|---|---|---|---|---|---|---|---|---|---|---|---|---|---|---|---|---|---|---|---|---|
| Ground | H | A | H | A | H | H | A | A | H | H | A | H | A | A | H | A | A | H | A | H | A | A | H | A | H | A | H | A | H | H | A | H | H | A |
| Result | D | L | W | D | D | W | L | W | W | W | D | W | W | L | W | W | W | W | W | W | D | D | W | L | W | W | L | D | W | D | W | L | W | W |
| Position | 6 | 15 | 6 | 9 | 9 | 6 | 10 | 6 | 4 | 3 | 3 | 3 | 3 | 3 | 3 | 1 | 1 | 1 | 1 | 1 | 1 | 1 | 1 | 1 | 1 | 1 | 1 | 1 | 1 | 1 | 1 | 1 | 1 | 1 |

Updated to match(es) played on 5 November 2022. Source: Soccerway
A = Away; H = Home; W = Win; D = Draw; L = Loss

==== Matches ====
The league fixtures were announced on 21 January 2022.

| 19 February 2022 1 | Yokohama F. Marinos | 2–2 | Cerezo Osaka | Yokohama |
| 14:04 JST | Nakagawa 69'; Anderson Lopes 78' | Report | Shindo 40'; Kiyotake 90' | Stadium: Nissan Stadium; Attendance: 13,737; Referee: Yudai Yamamoto |

| 23 February 2022 9 | Yokohama F. Marinos | 4–2 | Kawasaki Frontale | Yokohama |
| 14:03 JST | Élber 57', 64'; Nakagawa 58', 78' | Report | Ienaga 32'; Chinen 73' | Stadium: Nissan Stadium; Attendance: 20,433; Referee: Yusuke Araki |

| 27 February 2022 2 | Kashiwa Reysol | 3–1 | Yokohama F. Marinos | Kashiwa |
| 15:03 JST | Hosoya 24'; Douglas 60'; Koyamatsu 90+2' | Report | Anderson Lopes 5' | Stadium: Sankyo Frontier Kashiwa Stadium; Attendance: 8,918; Referee: Ryuji Sato |

| 2 March 2022 10 | Yokohama F. Marinos | 2–0 | Vissel Kobe | Yokohama |
| 19:33 JST | Nishimura 38', 90+5' | Report | | Stadium: Nissan Stadium; Attendance: 13,801; Referee: Masuya Ueda |

| 6 March 2022 3 | Yokohama F. Marinos | 2–0 | Shimizu S-Pulse | Yokohama |
| 14:03 JST | R. Koike 32'; Yoshio 43' | Report | | Stadium: Nissan Stadium; Attendance: 14,752; Referee: Takafumi Mikuriya |

| 12 March 2022 4 | Consadole Sapporo | 1–1 | Yokohama F. Marinos | Sapporo |
| 14:03 JST | Suga 70' | Report | Saneto 90+5' | Stadium: Sapporo Dome; Attendance: 9,115; Referee: Hiroki Kasahara |

| 18 March 2022 5 | Yokohama F. Marinos | 0–0 | Sagan Tosu | Yokohama |
| 19:03 JST | | Report | | Stadium: NHK Spring Mitsuzawa Football Stadium; Attendance: 6,689; Referee: Hiroyuki Kimura |

| 2 April 2022 6 | Yokohama F. Marinos | 2–1 | FC Tokyo | Yokohama |
| 19:03 JST | Nishimura 8'; Anderson Lopes 47' | Report | Abe 12' | Stadium: Nissan Stadium; Attendance: 20,823; Referee: Yudai Yamamoto |

| 6 April 2022 7 | Sanfrecce Hiroshima | 2–0 | Yokohama F. Marinos | Hiroshima |
| 19:03 JST | Morishima 34', 58' | Report | | Stadium: Edion Stadium Hiroshima; Attendance: 3,998; Referee: Hajime Matsuo |

| 10 April 2022 8 | Kashima Antlers | 0–3 | Yokohama F. Marinos | Kashima |
| 15:03 JST | | Report | Anderson Lopes 82'; Nishimura 89'; Misao 90+4' (o.g.) | Stadium: Kashima Soccer Stadium; Attendance: 17,646; Referee: Yuichi Nishimura |

| 7 May 2022 12 | Yokohama F. Marinos | 2–1 | Nagoya Grampus | Yokohama |
| 15:03 JST | Élber 35'; Anderson Lopes 86' | Report | Nakatani 24' | Stadium: Nissan Stadium; Attendance: 22,178; Referee: Ryuji Sato |

| 14 May 2022 13 | Shonan Bellmare | 1–4 | Yokohama F. Marinos | Hiratsuka |
| 16:03 JST | Wellington 83' | Report | Mizunuma 14'; R. Koike 20'; Anderson Lopes 59'; Léo Ceará 90+1' | Stadium: Lemon Gas Stadium Hiratsuka; Attendance: 10,752; Referee: Ryo Tanimoto |

| 18 May 2022 11 | Urawa Red Diamonds | 3–3 | Yokohama F. Marinos | Saitama |
| 19:34 JST | Junker 47', 81', 89' | Report | Mizunuma 12'; Anderson Lopes 19'; Miyaichi 30' | Stadium: Saitama Stadium 2002; Attendance: 19,425; Referee: Yusuke Araki |

| 21 May 2022 14 | Avispa Fukuoka | 1–0 | Yokohama F. Marinos | Fukuoka |
| 19:03 JST | Croux 58' | Report | | Stadium: Best Denki Stadium; Attendance: 7,162; Referee: Hajime Matsuo |

| 25 May 2022 15 | Yokohama F. Marinos | 2–0 | Kyoto Sanga | Yokohama |
| 19:06 JST | R. Koike 41'; Matsubara 72' | Report | | Stadium: Nissan Stadium; Attendance: 7,335; Referee: Futoshi Nakamura |

| 29 May 2022 16 | Júbilo Iwata | 0–2 | Yokohama F. Marinos | Iwata |
| 16:04 JST | | Report | Nakagawa 55'; Léo Ceará 63' | Stadium: Yamaha Stadium; Attendance: 10,196; Referee: Koichiro Fukushima |

| 18 June 2022 17 | Gamba Osaka | 1–2 | Yokohama F. Marinos | Suita |
| 19:03 JST | Dawhan 7' | Report | Nishimura 56'; Mizunuma 61' | Stadium: Panasonic Stadium Suita; Attendance: 19,039; Referee: Akihiko Ikeuchi |

| 25 June 2022 18 | Yokohama F. Marinos | 4–0 | Kashiwa Reysol | Yokohama |
| 16:03 JST | Nishimura 17'; Léo Ceará 19', 47'; Mizunuma 28' | Report | | Stadium: Nissan Stadium; Attendance: 23,368; Referee: Jumpei Iida |

| 2 July 2022 19 | Shimizu S-Pulse | 3–5 | Yokohama F. Marinos | Tokyo |
| 19:03 JST | Kamiya 13'; Santana 47'; Katayama 90+6' | Report | Nishimura 10'; Léo Ceará 45+2', 49', 52'; Miyaichi 88' | Stadium: Japan National Stadium; Attendance: 56,131; Referee: Ryuji Sato |

| 6 July 2022 20 | Yokohama F. Marinos | 3–0 | Sanfrecce Hiroshima | Yokohama |
| 19:03 JST | Y. Koike 32'; Nishimura 58'; Miyaichi 90+1' | Report | | Stadium: Nissan Stadium; Attendance: 13,311; Referee: Hiroyuki Kimura |

| 10 July 2022 21 | Cerezo Osaka | 2–2 | Yokohama F. Marinos | Osaka |
| 19:03 JST | Kato 31'; Taggart 63' | Report | Léo Ceará 84' (pen.), 90+2' | Stadium: Yodoko Sakura Stadium; Attendance: 10,729; Referee: Yuichi Nishimura |

| 16 July 2022 22 | Sagan Tosu | 2–2 | Yokohama F. Marinos | Tosu |
| JST | Miyashiro 24'; Hwang Seok-ho 5' | Report | Léo Ceará 18' (pen.); Mizunuma 85' | Stadium: Ekimae Real Estate Stadium; Attendance: 8,540; Referee: Yoshiro Imamura |

| 30 July 2022 23 | Yokohama F. Marinos | 2–0 | Kashima Antlers | Yokohama |
| 19:04 JST | Élber 37'; Iwata 51' | Report | | Stadium: Nissan Stadium; Attendance: 31,599; Referee: Ryo Tanimoto |

| 7 August 2022 24 | Kawasaki Frontale | 2–1 | Yokohama F. Marinos | Kawasaki |
| 19:04 JST | Leandro Damião 25'; Jesiel 90+9' | Report | Nakagawa 45+3' | Stadium: Kawasaki Todoroki Stadium; Attendance: 20,704; Referee: Hiroyuki Kimura |

| 3 September 2022 28 | FC Tokyo | 2–2 | Yokohama F. Marinos | Tokyo |
| 19:08 JST | Tsukagawa 53', 63' | Report | Iwata 40'; Nakagawa 45' | Stadium: Ajinomoto Stadium; Attendance: 29,034; Referee: Hayato Shimizu |

| 7 September 2022 25 | Yokohama F. Marinos | 3–0 | Shonan Bellmare | Yokohama |
| 19:03 JST | Nishimura 56'; Anderson Lopes 70' (pen.); Yan Matheus 89' | Report | | Stadium: Nissan Stadium; Attendance: 11,388; Referee: Ryuji Sato |

| 10 September 2022 29 | Yokohama F. Marinos | 1–0 | Avispa Fukuoka | Yokohama |
| JST | Anderson Lopes 14' | Report | | Stadium: Nissan Stadium; Attendance: 17,631; Referee: Takafumi Mikuriya |

| 14 September 2022 26 | Kyoto Sanga | 1–2 | Yokohama F. Marinos | Kameoka |
| JST | Kaneko 87' | Report | Eduardo 25'; Élber 50' | Stadium: Sanga Stadium by Kyocera; Attendance: 9,129; Referee: Koei Koya |

| 18 September 2022 30 | Yokohama F. Marinos | 0–0 | Consadole Sapporo | Yokohama |
| 14:03 JST | | Report | | Stadium: Nissan Stadium; Attendance: 20,341; Referee: Koichiro Fukushima |

| 1 October 2022 31 | Nagoya Grampus | 0–4 | Yokohama F. Marinos | Toyota |
| 16:03 JST | | Report | Mizunuma 16', 43'; Léo Ceará 90'; Fujita 90+6' | Stadium: Toyota Stadium; Attendance: 24,906; Referee: Hajime Matsuo |

| 8 October 2022 32 | Yokohama F. Marinos | 0–2 | Gamba Osaka | Yokohama |
| 14:03 JST | | Report | Juan Alano 8'; Patric 79' | Stadium: Nissan Stadium; Attendance: 32,516; Referee: Ryo Tanimoto |

| 12 October 2022 27 | Yokohama F. Marinos | 0–1 | Júbilo Iwata | Yokohama |
| 19:03 JST | | Report | Furukawa 84' | Stadium: Nissan Stadium; Attendance: 20,943; Referee: Jumpei Iida |

| 29 October 2022 33 | Yokohama F. Marinos | 4–1 | Urawa Red Diamonds | Yokohama |
| 15:03 JST | Élber 17', 57'; Anderson Lopes 37', 65' | Report | Junker 67' | Stadium: Nissan Stadium; Attendance: 46,387; Referee: Ryuji Sato |

| 5 November 2022 34 | Vissel Kobe | 1–3 | Yokohama F. Marinos | Kobe |
| 14:03 JST | Muto 45+3' | Report | Élber 26'; Nishimura 53'; Nakagawa 73' | Stadium: Noevir Stadium Kobe; Attendance: 22,949; Referee: Futoshi Nakamura |

=== Emperor's Cup ===
| 1 June 2022 Second round | Yokohama F. Marinos | 3−0 | Suzuka Point Getters | Yokohama |
| 19:00 JST | Nishimura 9'; Koike 75'; Ceará 90+3' | Report | | Stadium: NHK Spring Mitsuzawa Football Stadium; Attendance: 4,009; Referee: Takafumi Mikuriya |

| 22 June 2022 Third round | Yokohama F. Marinos | 0−2 | Tochigi SC | Utsunomiya |
| 19:00 JST | | Report | Kambe 58'; Juninho 90+1' | Stadium: Kanseki Stadium Tochigi; Attendance: 3,923; Referee: Hiroki Kasahara |

=== J.League Cup ===
==== Quarter-finals ====
| 3 August 2022 First leg | Sanfrecce Hiroshima | 3–1 | Yokohama F. Marinos | Hiroshima |
| 19:03 | Kashiwa 14'; Araki 71'; Notsuda 90+8' | JLeague.co (EN); JLeague.jp (JA) | Léo Ceará 46' | Stadium: EDION Stadium Hiroshima; Attendance: 5,650; Referee: Koichiro Fukushima |

| 10 August 2022 Second leg | Yokohama F. Marinos | 1–2 | Sanfrecce Hiroshima | Yokohama |
| 19:03 | Ceará 22' | JLeague.co (EN); JLeague.jp (JA) | Ben Khalifa 8'; Nogami 37' | Stadium: NHK Spring Mitsuzawa Football Stadium; Attendance: 9,255; Referee: Hajime Matsuo |

=== AFC Champions League ===
==== Group stage ====
| Pos | Team | Pld | W | D | L | GF | GA | GD | Pts | Qualification | YFM | JBH | HOA | SYD |
|---|---|---|---|---|---|---|---|---|---|---|---|---|---|---|
| 1 | (Japan) Yokohama F. Marinos | 6 | 4 | 1 | 1 | 9 | 3 | +6 | 13 | Advance to Round of 16 | — | 0–1 | 2–0 | 3–0 |
| 2 | (South Korea) Jeonbuk Hyundai Motors | 6 | 3 | 3 | 0 | 7 | 4 | +3 | 12 | Advance to Round of 16 | 1–1 | — | 1–0 | 0–0 |
| 3 | (Vietnam) Hoang Anh Gia Lai (H) | 6 | 1 | 2 | 3 | 4 | 7 | −3 | 5 | | 1–2 | 1–1 | — | 1–0 |
| 4 | (Australia) Sydney FC | 6 | 0 | 2 | 4 | 3 | 9 | −6 | 2 | | 0–1 | 2–3 | 1–1 | — |

Source: AFC
Rules for classification: Tiebreakers
(H) Hosts

| 16 April 2022 1 | Hoàng Anh Gia Lai (Vietnam) | 1–2 | (Japan) Yokohama F. Marinos | Ho Chi Minh City, Vietnam |
| 18:00 UTC+7 | Kida 31' (o.g.) | Report | Léo Ceará 19', 25' | Stadium: Thống Nhất Stadium; Attendance: 11,200; Referee: Mongkolchai Pechsri (Thailand) |

| 19 April 2022 2 | Yokohama F. Marinos (Japan) | 0–1 | (South Korea) Jeonbuk Hyundai Motors | Ho Chi Minh City, Vietnam |
| 21:00 UTC+7 | | Report | Iljutcenko 31' (pen.) | Stadium: Thống Nhất Stadium; Attendance: 1,015; Referee: Abdulrahman Al-Jassim (Qatar) |

| 22 April 2022 3 | Sydney FC (Australia) | 0–1 | (Japan) Yokohama F. Marinos | Ho Chi Minh City, Vietnam |
| 21:00 UTC+7 | | Report | Tsunoda 80' | Stadium: Thống Nhất Stadium; Attendance: 1,025; Referee: Hassan Akrami (Iran) |

| 25 April 2022 4 | Yokohama F. Marinos (Japan) | 3–0 | (Australia) Sydney FC | Ho Chi Minh City, Vietnam |
| 18:00 UTC+7 | Saneto 6'; Nishimura 11'; Lopes 87' | Report | | Stadium: Thống Nhất Stadium; Attendance: 1,979; Referee: Mongkolchai Pechsri (Thailand) |

| 28 April 2022 5 | Yokohama F. Marinos (Japan) | 2–0 | (Vietnam) Hoàng Anh Gia Lai | Ho Chi Minh City, Vietnam |
| 18:00 UTC+7 | Júnior 36' (pen.); Hatanaka 83' | Report | | Stadium: Thống Nhất Stadium; Attendance: 7,268; Referee: Ammar Mahfoodh (Bahrain) |

| 1 May 2022 6 | Jeonbuk Hyundai Motors (South Korea) | 1–1 | (Japan) Yokohama F. Marinos | Ho Chi Minh City, Vietnam |
| 21:00 UTC+7 | Kim Bo-kyung 11' | Report | Lopes 4' | Stadium: Thống Nhất Stadium; Attendance: 1,239; Referee: Hassan Akrami (Iran) |

==== Knockout stage ====
| 18 August 2022 Round of 16 | Vissel Kobe (Japan) | 3–2 | (Japan) Yokohama F. Marinos | Saitama |
| 20:00 UTC+9 | Iino 7'; Sasaki 31' (pen.); Oda 80' | Report | Nishimura 9'; Lopes 89' | Stadium: Saitama Stadium 2002; Attendance: 11,528; Referee: Alireza Faghani (Iran) |

== Statistics ==
=== Appearances and goals ===
As of 5 November 2022

| No. | Pos | Nat | Player | Total | | J1 League | | Emperor's Cup | | J.League Cup | | AFC Champions League | |
| No. | Pos | Nat | Player | Apps | Goals | Apps | Goals | Apps | Goals | Apps | Goals | Apps | Goals |
Goalkeepers
| 1 | GK | (Japan) JPN | Yohei Takaoka | 42 | 0 | 34 | 0 | 0 | 0 | 1 | 0 | 7 | 0 |
| 50 | GK | (Japan) JPN | Powell Obinna Obi | 3 | 0 | 0 | 0 | 2 | 0 | 1 | 0 | 0 | 0 |
Defenders
| 2 | DF | (Japan) JPN | Katsuya Nagato | 33 | 0 | 24+2 | 0 | 0+2 | 0 | 0 | 0 | 4+1 | 0 |
| 4 | DF | (Japan) JPN | Shinnosuke Hatanaka | 24 | 1 | 11+5 | 0 | 1 | 0 | 2 | 0 | 4+1 | 1 |
| 5 | DF | (Brazil) BRA | Eduardo | 27 | 1 | 22+2 | 1 | 1 | 0 | 0 | 0 | 2 | 0 |
| 19 | DF | (Japan) JPN | Yuki Saneto | 10 | 2 | 5 | 1 | 0 | 0 | 0+1 | 0 | 4 | 1 |
| 24 | DF | (Japan) JPN | Tomoki Iwata | 40 | 2 | 31+1 | 2 | 1 | 0 | 0 | 0 | 6+1 | 0 |
| 25 | DF | (Japan) JPN | Ryuta Koike | 33 | 3 | 24+2 | 3 | 0 | 0 | 1+1 | 0 | 5 | 0 |
| 26 | DF | (Japan) JPN | Yuta Koike | 14 | 2 | 4+4 | 1 | 2 | 1 | 2 | 0 | 0+2 | 0 |
| 27 | DF | (Japan) JPN | Ken Matsubara | 29 | 1 | 18+3 | 1 | 2 | 0 | 1+1 | 0 | 3+1 | 0 |
| 33 | DF | (Japan) JPN | Ryotaro Tsunoda | 26 | 1 | 11+6 | 0 | 2 | 0 | 2 | 0 | 3+2 | 1 |
Midfielders
| 6 | MF | (Japan) JPN | Kota Watanabe | 31 | 0 | 17+7 | 0 | 2 | 0 | 2 | 0 | 2+1 | 0 |
| 7 | MF | (Brazil) BRA | Élber | 35 | 8 | 24+5 | 8 | 0 | 0 | 0+1 | 0 | 5 | 0 |
| 8 | MF | (Japan) JPN | Takuya Kida | 30 | 0 | 21+2 | 0 | 0 | 0 | 0 | 0 | 6+1 | 0 |
| 10 | MF | (Brazil) BRA | Marcos Júnior | 31 | 1 | 11+12 | 0 | 1 | 0 | 2 | 0 | 2+3 | 1 |
| 14 | MF | (Japan) JPN | Kaina Yoshio | 16 | 1 | 2+7 | 1 | 1+1 | 0 | 2 | 0 | 1+2 | 0 |
| 16 | MF | (Japan) JPN | Joel Chima Fujita | 39 | 1 | 14+15 | 1 | 0+1 | 0 | 2 | 0 | 2+5 | 0 |
| 17 | MF | (Japan) JPN | Ryo Miyaichi | 21 | 3 | 7+8 | 3 | 1+1 | 0 | 0 | 0 | 3+1 | 0 |
| 18 | MF | (Japan) JPN | Kota Mizunuma | 42 | 7 | 20+11 | 7 | 1+1 | 0 | 2 | 0 | 2+5 | 0 |
| 20 | MF | (Brazil) BRA | Yan Matheus | 5 | 1 | 0+5 | 1 | 0 | 0 | 0 | 0 | 0 | 0 |
| 28 | MF | (Japan) JPN | Riku Yamane | 16 | 0 | 4+7 | 0 | 1 | 0 | 0+2 | 0 | 1+1 | 0 |
Forwards
| 9 | FW | (Brazil) BRA | Léo Ceará | 39 | 16 | 14+17 | 11 | 1+1 | 1 | 2 | 2 | 4 | 2 |
| 11 | FW | (Brazil) BRA | Anderson Lopes | 34 | 14 | 20+8 | 11 | 0 | 0 | 0+2 | 0 | 3+1 | 3 |
| 23 | FW | (Japan) JPN | Teruhito Nakagawa | 38 | 7 | 15+16 | 7 | 0+1 | 0 | 0 | 0 | 4+2 | 0 |
| 30 | FW | (Japan) JPN | Takuma Nishimura | 37 | 13 | 21+6 | 10 | 1+1 | 1 | 0+1 | 0 | 4+3 | 2 |
| 45 | FW | (Japan) JPN | Yuhi Murakami | 1 | 0 | 0 | 0 | 0 | 0 | 0+1 | 0 | 0 | 0 |
Players loaned or transferred out during the season
| 35 | FW | (Japan) JPN | Ryonosuke Kabayama | 10 | 0 | 0+7 | 0 | 2 | 0 | 0 | 0 | 0+1 | 0 |
| 39 | FW | (Japan) JPN | Talla Ndao | 1 | 0 | 0+1 | 0 | 0 | 0 | 0 | 0 | 0 | 0 |
