= Yan Matheus =

Brazilian footballer (born 1998)

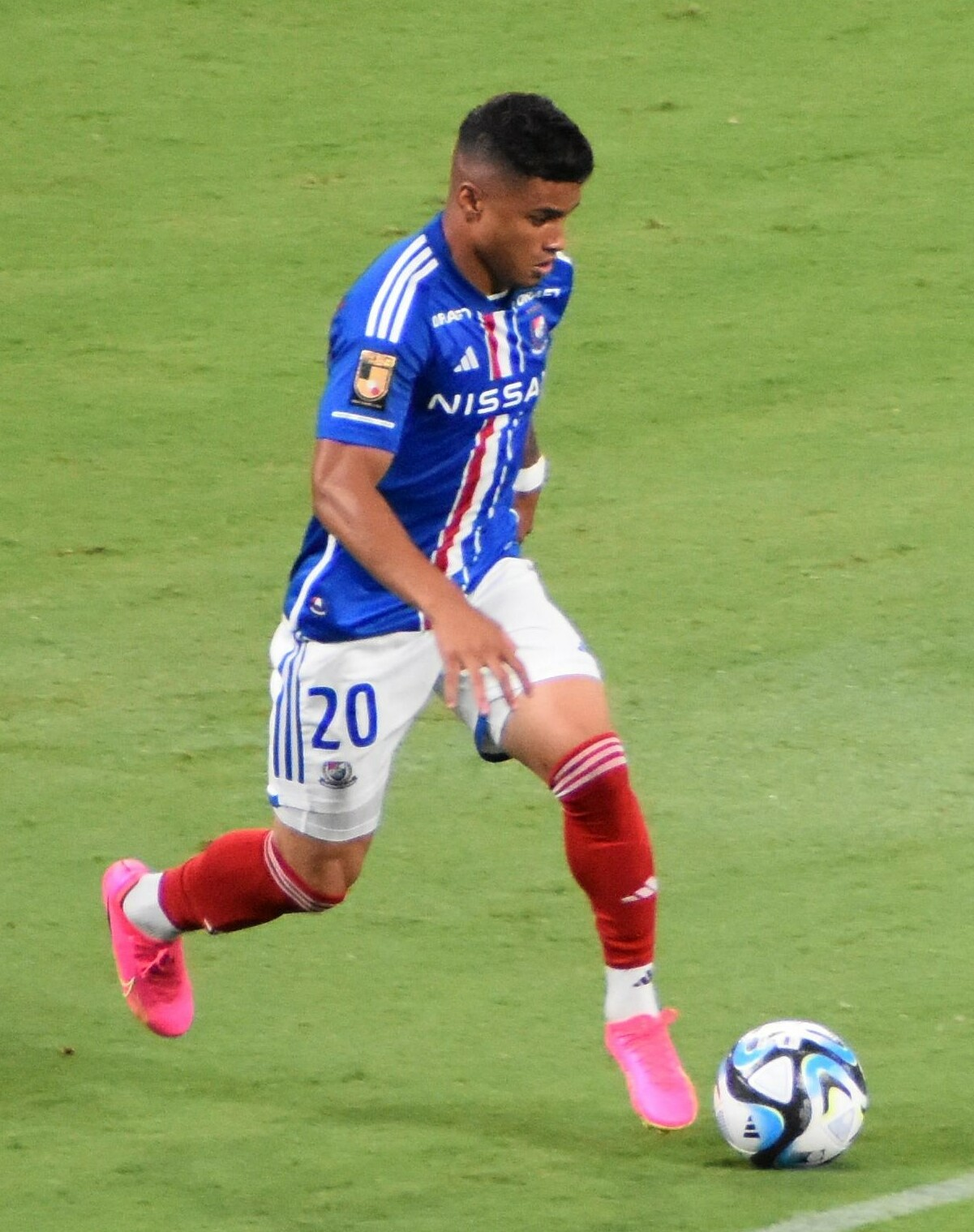
- Yan with Yokohama F. Marinos in 2023

Personal information
- Full name: Yan Matheus Santos Souza
- Date of birth: 4 September 1998 (age 28)
- Place of birth: Aramari, Brazil
- Height: 1.70 m (5 ft 7 in)
- Position: Winger

Team information
- Current team: Kashima Antlers
- Number: 18

Youth career
- 2009–2018: Vitória
- 2017–2018: → Palmeiras (loan)

Senior career*
Years	Team	Apps	(Gls)
2015–2017	Vitória	5	(0)
2018–2022	Palmeiras	0	(0)
2019	→ Estoril (loan)	13	(2)
2019–2020	→ Sport Recife (loan)	20	(2)
2020–2022	→ Moreirense (loan)	59	(10)
2022–2025	Yokohama F. Marinos	96	(17)
2025–2026	Qatar SC	16	(0)
2026–	Kashima Antlers	1	(0)

International career
2015	Brazil U17	1	(0)
- * Club domestic league appearances and goals as of 22:18, 11 August 2026 (UTC)

Yan Matheus Santos Souza (born 4 September 1998), known as Yan Matheus or just Yan, is a Brazilian professional footballer who plays as a winger for J1 League club Kashima Antlers.

== Club career ==
=== Vitória ===
Yan was born in Alagoinhas, Bahia, and joined Vitória's youth setup in 2009, aged 11. He made his first team debut on 31 October 2015, coming on as a second-half substitute for Vander in a 3–2 Série B home loss to Náutico; he also assisted Rafaelson's second goal.

Yan featured in two more matches for the club during the campaign, as they achieved promotion to the Série A. He made his top tier debut on 30 June 2016, replacing Dagoberto late into a 3–2 home win over Sport Recife.

=== Palmeiras ===
In January 2017, Vitória agreed to loan Yan to Palmeiras, as a part of the deal which saw Cleiton Xavier move in the opposite direction; the loan move only became official in April. In April 2018, he signed a permanent deal with Verdão after the club exercised his buyout clause.

==== Loan to Estoril ====
On 31 January 2019, after making no first-team appearances for Palmeiras, Yan was loaned to LigaPro side Estoril until the end of the season. He made his debut for the club on 17 February, in a 1–1 away draw against Mafra.

Yan scored his first professional goal on 31 March 2019, but in a 3–1 home loss to Benfica B. He scored a further goal in 13 appearances for Estoril, as they missed out promotion after finishing third.

==== Loan to Sport Recife ====
On 10 June 2019, Yan moved on loan to Sport Recife until the end of the year. After featuring regularly, his loan was renewed for a further year on 6 December, but Palmeiras recalled him on 13 July 2020.

==== Loan to Moreirense ====
On 16 August 2020, Yan returned to Portugal and joined Moreirense in the Primeira Liga on a three-year loan deal. A regular starter, he scored six goals during the 2021–22 season but was unable to avoid the club's relegation.

In July 2022, Moreirense bought 50% of Yan's economic rights.

=== Yokohama F. Marinos ===
On 9 August 2022, Yan was confirmed at J1 League side Yokohama F. Marinos.

=== Qatar SC ===
On 28 August 2025, Yan was confirmed at Qatar Stars League club Qatar.

=== Kashima Antlers ===
In July 2026, less than a year after leaving Japan for Qatar, Yan transferred back to the J1 League joining Kashima Antlers.

== Career statistics ==
As of 4 August 2026

Appearances and goals by club, season and competition
Club	Season	League			State league		National cup		League cup		Continental		Other		Total	
Club	Season	Division	Apps	Goals	Apps	Goals	Apps	Goals	Apps	Goals	Apps	Goals	Apps	Goals	Apps	Goals
Vitória	2015	Série B	3	0	0	0	0	0	—		—		—		3	0
Vitória	2016	Série A	1	0	1 (Note: Appearance(s) in Campeonato Baiano)	0	0	0	—		—		—		2	0
Vitória	2017	Série A	0	0	0	0	0	0	—		—		0	0	0	0
Vitória	Total		4	0	1	0	0	0	—		—		0	0	5	0
Palmeiras	2018	Série A	0	0	0	0	0	0	—		—		—		0	0
Palmeiras	2019	Série A	0	0	0	0	0	0	—		—		—		0	0
Palmeiras	Total		0	0	0	0	0	0	—		—		—		0	0
Estoril (loan)	2018–19	LigaPro	13	2	—		—		—		—		—		13	2
Sport Recife (loan)	2019	Série B	16	1	—		0	0	—		—		6 (Note: Appearance(s) in Copa do Nordeste)	0	22	1
Sport Recife (loan)	2020	Série A	0	0	4 (Note: Appearance(s) in Campeonato Pernambucano)	1	0	0	—		—		—		4	1
Sport Recife (loan)	Total		16	1	4	1	0	0	—		—		6	0	26	2
Moreirense (loan)	2020–21	Primeira Liga	28	4	—		2	0	—		—		—		30	4
Moreirense (loan)	2021–22	Primeira Liga	31	6	—		3	3	1	0	—		1 (Note: Appearance(s) in Primeira Liga relegation play-offs)	0	36	9
Moreirense (loan)	Total		59	10	—		5	3	1	0	—		1	0	66	13
Yokohama F. Marinos	2022	J1 League	6	1	—		0	0	0	0	—		—		6	1
Yokohama F. Marinos	2023	J1 League	32	6	—		0	0	6	1	6 (Note: Appearance(s) in AFC Champions League)	1	1 (Note: Appearance(s) in Japanese Super Cup)	0	45	8
Yokohama F. Marinos	2024	J1 League	34	5	—		2	2	4	2	13	4	—		53	13
Yokohama F. Marinos	2025	J1 League	24	5	—		0	0	—		5	2	—		29	7
Yokohama F. Marinos	Total		96	17	—		2	2	10	3	24	7	1	0	132	29
Qatar SC	2025–26	QSL	16	0	—		1 (Note: Appearance(s) in Amir of Qatar Cup)	1	4 (Note: Appearance(s) in QSL Cup)	6	—		—		21	7
Kashima Antlers	2026–27	J1 League	1	0	—		0	0	0	0	—		—		1	0
Career total			205	30	5	1	8	6	15	9	24	7	8	0	264	53
