= Joel Chima Fujita =

Japanese footballer (born 2002)

Joel Chima Fujita 藤田 譲瑠 チマ
- Fujita in 2026

Personal information
- Full name: Joel Chima Fujita
- Date of birth: 16 February 2002 (age 24)
- Place of birth: Tokyo, Japan
- Height: 1.75 m (5 ft 9 in)
- Position: Defensive midfielder

Team information
- Current team: FC St. Pauli
- Number: 16

Youth career
- 2008–2013: Machida Okura FC
- 2014–2019: Tokyo Verdy

Senior career*
Years	Team	Apps	(Gls)
2019–2021	Tokyo Verdy	45	(3)
2021	Tokushima Vortis	28	(1)
2022–2023	Yokohama F. Marinos	46	(3)
2023–2025	Sint-Truiden	58	(1)
2025–	FC St. Pauli	39	(2)

International career^{‡}
2019	Japan U17	4	(0)
2023	Japan U22	1	(0)
2022–2024	Japan U23	20	(1)
2022–	Japan	8	(0)
Medal record
Men's football
Representing Japan
EAFF Championship
Winner	2022 Japan	Team
AFC U-23 Asian Cup
Third place	2022 Uzbekistan	Team
Winner	2024 Qatar	Team
- * Club domestic league appearances and goals as of 20:30, 23 October 2026 (UTC) ‡ National team caps and goals as of 28 March 2026

Joel Chima Fujita (藤田 譲瑠 チマ, Fujita Joeru Chima; born 16 February 2002) is a Japanese professional footballer who plays as a defensive midfielder for 2. Bundesliga club FC St. Pauli and the Japan national team.

== Club career ==
=== Sint-Truiden ===
On 27 July 2023, Fujita left Japan for the first time to join Sint-Truiden on a permanent deal.

== International career ==
On 4 April 2024, Fujita was called up to the Japan U23 squad for the 2024 AFC U-23 Asian Cup.

== Personal life ==
Fujita was born in Tokyo on 16 February 2002 to an Igbo Nigerian father and Japanese mother, and chose to represent the Japan national football team.

== Career statistics ==
=== Club ===
As of match played 23 October 2026

Appearances and goals by club, season and competition
Club	Season	League			National cup (Note: Includes Emperor's Cup, Belgian Cup, DFB-Pokal)		League cup (Note: Includes J.League Cup)		Continental		Total	
Club	Season	Division	Apps	Goals	Apps	Goals	Apps	Goals	Apps	Goals	Apps	Goals
Tokyo Verdy	2019	J2 League	4	0	0	0	0	0	—		4	0
Tokyo Verdy	2020	J2 League	41	3	0	0	0	0	—		41	3
Tokyo Verdy	Total		45	3	0	0	0	0	—		45	3
Tokushima Vortis	2021	J1 League	28	1	0	0	5	0	—		33	1
Yokohama F. Marinos	2022	J1 League	29	1	1	0	2	0	7 (Note: Appearances in AFC Champions League)	0	39	1
Yokohama F. Marinos	2023	J1 League	17	2	0	0	4	0	0	0	21	2
Yokohama F. Marinos	Total		46	3	1	0	6	0	7	0	60	3
Sint-Truiden	2023–24	Belgian Pro League	25	1	2	0	—		—		27	1
Sint-Truiden	2024–25	Belgian Pro League	23	0	3	0	—		—		26	0
Sint-Truiden	Total		48	1	5	0	—		—		53	1
FC St. Pauli	2025–26	Bundesliga	32	1	4	0	—		—		36	1
FC St. Pauli	2026–27	2. Bundesliga	7	1	1	0	—		—		8	1
FC St. Pauli	Total		39	2	5	0	—		—		44	2
Career total			206	10	11	0	11	0	7	0	235	10

=== International ===
As of match played 28 March 2026

Appearances and goals by national team and year
National team	Year	Apps	Goals
Japan	2022	2	0
Japan	2025	5	0
Japan	2026	1	0
Total		8	0

== Honours ==
Yokohama F. Marinos

- J1 League: 2022

Japan

- EAFF Championship: 2022

Japan U23

- AFC U-23 Asian Cup: 2024

Individual

- AFC U-23 Asian Cup Most Valuable Player: 2024
