= Shogo Asada =

Japanese footballer (born 1998)

Shogo Asada 麻田 将吾
Personal information
- Full name: Shogo Asada
- Date of birth: 6 July 1998 (age 28)
- Place of birth: Azumino, Nagano, Japan
- Height: 1.86 m (6 ft 1 in)
- Position: Defender

Team information
- Current team: Kashiwa Reysol
- Number: 3

Youth career
- –2013: Alfoot Azumino
- 2014–2016: Kyoto Sanga

Senior career*
Years	Team	Apps	(Gls)
2017–2026	Kyoto Sanga	147	(1)
2018–2019	→ Kamatamare Sanuki (loan)	55	(2)
2026–	Kashiwa Reysol	0	(0)

International career
2014	Japan U16	2	(0)
2017	Japan U19	2	(0)
- * Club domestic league appearances and goals as of 10 August 2026

Shogo Asada (麻田 将吾, Asada Shogo; born 6 July 1998) is a Japanese professional footballer who plays as a defender for Kashiwa Reysol.

== Career ==
Shogo Asada joined J2 League club Kyoto Sanga FC in 2017.

== Career statistics ==
Updated to 20 July 2022.

Appearances and goals by club, season and competition
Club	Season	League			Emperor's Cup		J.League Cup		Total	
Club	Season	Division	Apps	Goals	Apps	Goals	Apps	Goals	Apps	Goals
Kyoto Sanga	2017	J2 League	4	0	1	0	–		5	0
Kamatamare Sanuki	2018	J2 League	27	0	1	0	–		28	0
Kamatamare Sanuki	2019	J3 League	28	2	1	0	–		29	2
Kyoto Sanga	2020	J2 League	8	0	–		–		8	0
Kyoto Sanga	2021	J2 League	38	0	1	0	–		39	0
Kyoto Sanga	2022	J1 League	21	0	3	0	5	0	29	0
Career total			126	2	7	0	5	0	138	2
