= Kenta Inoue =

Japanese footballer (born 1998)

Kenta Inoue 井上 健太
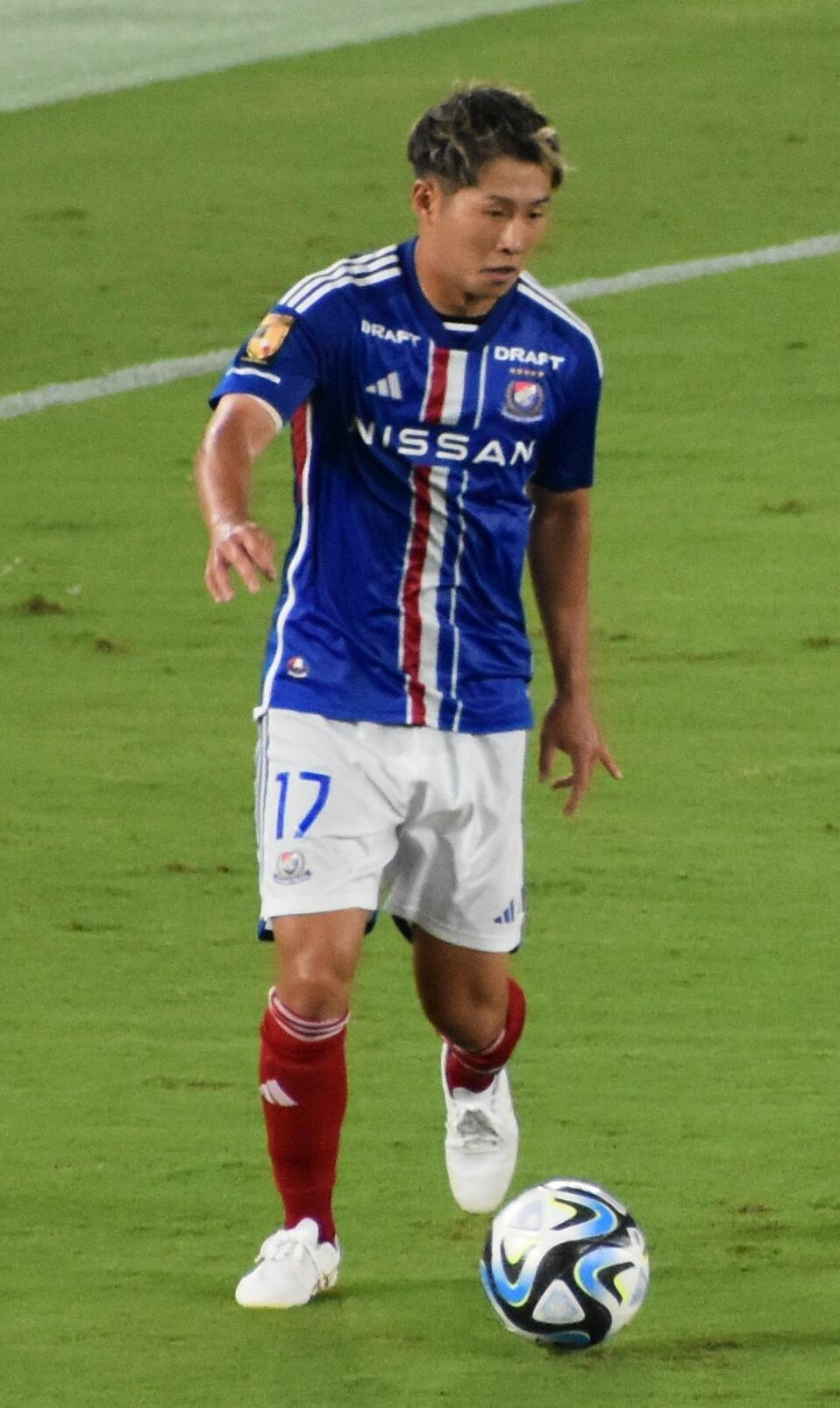

Personal information
- Full name: Kenta Inoue
- Date of birth: 23 July 1998 (age 28)
- Place of birth: Kanagawa, Japan
- Height: 1.71 m (5 ft 7 in)
- Position: Midfielder

Team information
- Current team: Shimizu S-Pulse
- Number: 8

Youth career
- Osaki SC
- Yokohama Junior SC
- 2014–2016: Rissho University Shonan High School

College career
| Years | Team | Apps | (Gls) |
| 2017–2020 | Fukuoka University | | |

Senior career*
| Years | Team | Apps | (Gls) |
| 2020–2022 | Oita Trinita | 63 | (1) |
| 2023–2025 | Yokohama F. Marinos | 67 | (1) |
| 2026– | Shimizu S-Pulse | 3 | (0) |
- * Club domestic league appearances and goals as of 10 August 2026

Kenta Inoue (井上 健太, Inoue Kenta; born 23 July 1998) is a Japanese professional footballer who plays as a midfielder for J1 League club Shimizu S-Pulse.

== Career ==
Inoue started his professional career as a specially designated player for Oita Trinita, from Fukuoka University in the 2020 J1 League season. He joined the team fully from the 2021 season and played for two years, making 79 appearances and scoring 2 goals.

Kenta made his league debut for Oita against Sagan Tosu on the 4 July 2020. He scored his first league goal for the club against Blaublitz Akita on the 25 May 2022, scoring in the 44th minute.

In December 2022, it was announced Inoue would be moving to J1 League champions club, Yokohama F. Marinos for the 2023 season.

In December 2025, Inoue transferred to fellow J1 League club Shimizu S-Pulse.

== Career statistics ==
=== Club ===
As of end of the 2025 season.

Appearances and goals by club, season and competition
| Club | Season | League | | | National cup (Note: Includes Emperors Cup) | | League cup (Note: Includes J.League Cup) | | Continental | | Other | | Total | |
| Club | Season | Division | Apps | Goals | Apps | Goals | Apps | Goals | Apps | Goals | Apps | Goals | Apps | Goals |
|---|---|---|---|---|---|---|---|---|---|---|---|---|---|---|
| Fukuoka University | 2018 | – | | | 2 | 0 | – | | – | | – | | 2 | 0 |
| Fukuoka University | 2020 | – | | | 2 | 0 | – | | – | | – | | 2 | 0 |
| Fukuoka University | Total | | 0 | 0 | 4 | 0 | 0 | 0 | 0 | 0 | 0 | 0 | 4 | 0 |
| Oita Trinita | 2020 | J1 League | 6 | 0 | 0 | 0 | 2 | 0 | – | | 0 | 0 | 8 | 0 |
| Oita Trinita | 2021 | J1 League | 23 | 0 | 3 | 1 | 4 | 0 | – | | 0 | 0 | 30 | 1 |
| Oita Trinita | 2022 | J2 League | 34 | 1 | 0 | 0 | 6 | 0 | – | | 1 (Note: Appearance in J1/J2 play-offs) | 0 | 41 | 1 |
| Oita Trinita | Total | | 63 | 1 | 3 | 1 | 12 | 0 | 0 | 0 | 1 | 0 | 79 | 2 |
| Yokohama F. Marinos | 2023 | J1 League | 13 | 0 | 2 | 1 | 7 | 0 | 3 (Note: Appearances in AFC Champions League Elite) | 0 | – | | 25 | 1 |
| Yokohama F. Marinos | 2024 | J1 League | 26 | 1 | 5 | 2 | 3 | 0 | 7 | 3 | – | | 41 | 6 |
| Yokohama F. Marinos | 2025 | J1 League | 28 | 0 | 1 | 0 | 2 | 0 | 5 | 0 | – | | 36 | 0 |
| Yokohama F. Marinos | Total | | 67 | 1 | 8 | 3 | 12 | 0 | 15 | 3 | 0 | 0 | 102 | 7 |
| Career total | | | 130 | 2 | 15 | 4 | 24 | 0 | 15 | 3 | 1 | 0 | 185 | 9 |
