= Fuma Shirasaka =

Japanese footballer

Fuma Shirasaka 白坂 楓馬
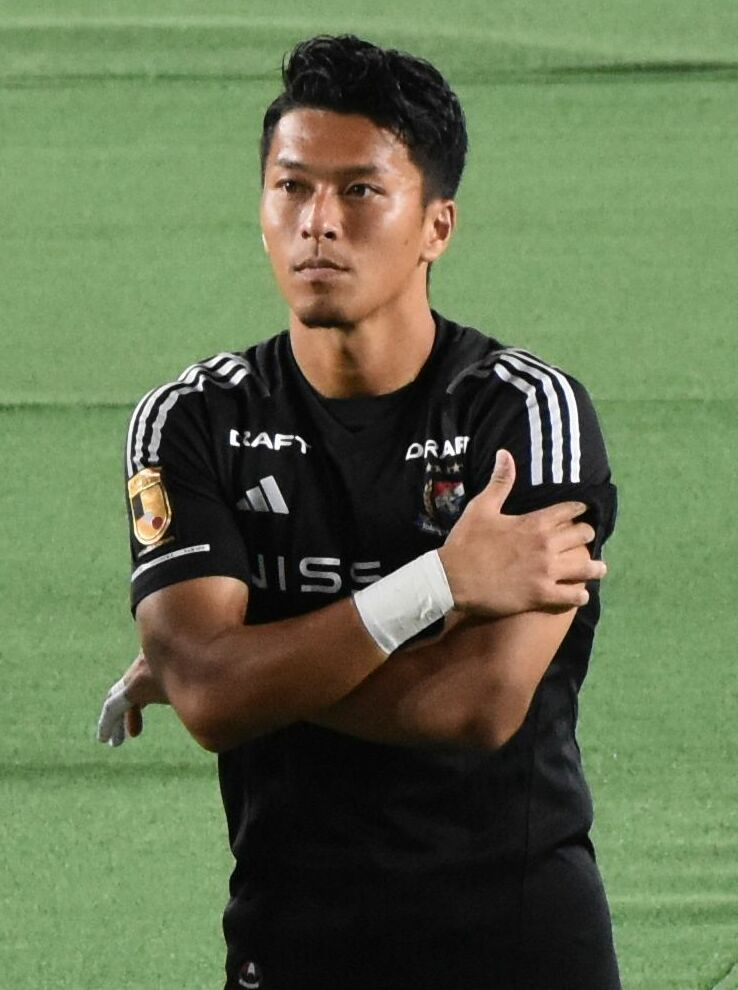
- Shirasaka in July 2023

Personal information
- Date of birth: 5 December 1996 (age 29)
- Place of birth: Kanagawa, Japan
- Height: 1.80 m (5 ft 11 in)
- Position: Goalkeeper

Team information
- Current team: Ehime FC
- Number: 31

Youth career
- Chigasaki Owada FC
- Yokohama F. Marinos
- 2012–2014: Toko Gakuen High School

College career
Years	Team	Apps	(Gls)
2015–2018	Ritsumeikan University		

Senior career*
Years	Team	Apps	(Gls)
2019–2020	Honda FC	39	(0)
2021–2024	Yokohama F. Marinos	3	(0)
2021–2022	→ Kagoshima United (loan)	39	(0)
2025–	Ehime FC	13	(0)
- * Club domestic league appearances and goals as of 12 July 2025

Fuma Shirasaka (白坂 楓馬, Shirasaka Fuma; born 5 December 1996) is a Japanese footballer who plays as a goalkeeper for J3 League club Ehime FC.

== Career statistics ==
As of 27 February 2025.

Appearances and goals by club, season and competition
Club	Season	League			Emperor's Cup		J. League Cup		Other		Total	
Club	Season	Division	Apps	Goals	Apps	Goals	Apps	Goals	Apps	Goals	Apps	Goals
Honda FC	2019	JFL	28	0	5	0	–		–		33	0
Honda FC	2020	JFL	11	0	4	0	–		–		15	0
Honda FC	Total		39	0	9	0	0	0	0	0	48	0
Yokohama F. Marinos	2021	J1 League	0	0	0	0	0	0	–		0	0
Yokohama F. Marinos	2023	J1 League	0	0	0	0	0	0	–		0	0
Yokohama F. Marinos	2024	J1 League	3	0	0	0	0	0	1 (Note: Appearance in AFC Champions League)	0	4	0
Yokohama F. Marinos	Total		3	0	0	0	0	0	1	0	4	0
Kagoshima United (loan)	2021	J3 League	5	0	1	0	–		–		6	0
Kagoshima United (loan)	2022	J3 League	34	0	0	0	–		–		34	0
Kagoshima United (loan)	Total		39	0	1	0	0	0	0	0	40	0
Ehime FC	2025	J2 League	2	0	0	0	0	0	–		2	0
Career total			83	0	10	0	0	0	1	0	94	0
