= Ryuta Koike =

Japanese footballer

Ryuta Koike 小池 龍太
Personal information
- Full name: Ryuta Koike
- Date of birth: August 29, 1995 (age 31)
- Place of birth: Hachiōji, Tokyo, Japan
- Height: 1.69 m (5 ft 6 1/2 in)
- Position: Right back

Team information
- Current team: Kashima Antlers
- Number: 25

Youth career
- 2008–2013: JFA Academy Fukushima

Senior career*
Years	Team	Apps	(Gls)
2014–2016	Renofa Yamaguchi	89	(4)
2017–2019	Kashiwa Reysol	85	(0)
2019–2020	Lokeren	27	(2)
2020–2024	Yokohama F. Marinos	85	(9)
2025–	Kashima Antlers	37	(1)

International career^{‡}
2022–	Japan	2	(0)
Medal record
Men's football
Representing Japan
EAFF Championship
Winner	2022 Japan	Team
- * Club domestic league appearances and goals as of 9 August 2026 ‡ National team caps and goals as of 27 July 2022

Ryuta Koike (小池 龍太, Koike Ryūta; born August 29, 1995) is a Japanese professional footballer who plays as a right back for J1 League club Kashima Antlers and the Japan national team.

== Career ==
During his five years-stint with JFA Academy, he was moved from midfield to defence. He was signed by Renofa Yamaguchi in January 2014.

He was signed by Renofa Yamaguchi in January 2014.

In December 2024, it was announced that Koike would be joining Kashima Antlers for the 2025 season.

== Career statistics ==
As of end of 2024 season

Appearances and goals by club, season and competition
Club	Season	League			National Cup (Note: Includes Emperor's Cup and Belgian Cup)		League Cup (Note: Includes J.League Cup)		Continental (Note: Includes AFC Champions League)		Other		Total	
Club	Season	Division	Apps	Goals	Apps	Goals	Apps	Goals	Apps	Goals	Apps	Goals	Apps	Goals
Renofa Yamaguchi	2014	JFL	17	0	0	0	–		–		0	0	17	0
Renofa Yamaguchi	2015	J3 League	30	1	1	0	–		–		0	0	31	1
Renofa Yamaguchi	2016	J2 League	42	3	3	0	–		–		0	0	45	3
Renofa Yamaguchi	Total		89	4	4	0	0	0	0	0	0	0	93	4
Kashiwa Reysol	2017	J1 League	32	0	3	0	3	0	–		0	0	38	0
Kashiwa Reysol	2018	J1 League	32	0	0	0	4	0	5	0	0	0	41	0
Kashiwa Reysol	2019	J2 League	21	0	1	0	0	0	–		0	0	22	0
Kashiwa Reysol	Total		85	0	4	0	7	0	5	0	0	0	101	1
KSC Lokeren	2019–20	First Division B	27	2	2	0	–		–		0	0	29	2
Yokohama F. Marinos	2020	J1 League	21	2	0	0	1	0	2	0	0	0	24	2
Yokohama F. Marinos	2021	J1 League	31	4	0	0	7	0	3	0	0	0	38	4
Yokohama F. Marinos	2022	J1 League	26	3	0	0	2	0	5	0	0	0	33	3
Yokohama F. Marinos	2023	J1 League	0	0	0	0	1	0	0	0	0	0	1	0
Yokohama F. Marinos	2024	J1 League	7	0	2	0	2	0	5	0	0	0	16	0
Yokohama F. Marinos	Total		85	9	2	0	13	0	15	0	0	0	112	9
Kashima Antlers	2025	J1 League	30	1	2	0	2	0	0	0	0	0	34	1
Kashima Antlers	2026	J1 100 Year Vision League	2	0	0	0	0	0	0	0	0	0	2	0
Kashima Antlers	Total		32	1	2	0	2	0	0	0	0	0	36	1
Career total			318	16	14	0	22	0	20	0	0	0	371	16

== Honours ==
=== Club ===
Yokohama F. Marinos

- J1 League: 2022

Kashima Antlers

- J1 League: 2025

=== International ===
- EAFF Championship: 2022

=== Individual ===
- J.League Best XI: 2022
