= Yuta Koike =

Japanese footballer (born 1996)

Yuta Koike 小池 裕太
Personal information
- Full name: Yuta Koike
- Date of birth: 6 November 1996 (age 30)
- Place of birth: Tochigi, Japan
- Height: 1.70 m (5 ft 7 in)
- Position: Left back

Team information
- Current team: Tochigi City
- Number: 32

Youth career
- 2003–2008: FC Spirits
- 2009–2011: FC Anhelo Utsunomiya
- 2012–2014: Albirex Niigata

College career
Years	Team	Apps	(Gls)
2015–2018	Ryutsu Keizai University		

Senior career*
Years	Team	Apps	(Gls)
2016	Kashima Antlers	0	(0)
2018–2019	Sint-Truiden	0	(0)
2019	→ Kashima Antlers (loan)	14	(1)
2020–2021	Cerezo Osaka	9	(0)
2022–2024	Yokohama F. Marinos	12	(1)
2025	Vissel Kobe	0	(0)
2026–	Tochigi City	21	(2)
Medal record
Kashima Antlers
Winner	J1 League	2016
Winner	Emperor's Cup	2016
- * Club domestic league appearances and goals as of 16 August 2026

Yuta Koike (小池 裕太, Koike Yūta; born November 6, 1996) is a Japanese footballer who plays as a left back and currently plays for J2 League club Tochigi City.

== Career ==
Yuta Koike joined J1 League club Kashima Antlers in 2016. On May 18, he debuted in J.League Cup (v Shonan Bellmare).

On 10 January 2025, Koike officially transferred to J1 defending champions Vissel Kobe for the 2025 season.

== Career statistics ==
As of 28 April 2026

Appearances and goals by club, season and competition
Club	Season	League			National cup (Note: Includes Emperors Cup)		League cup (Note: Includes J.League Cup)		Continental		Other		Total	
Club	Season	Division	Apps	Goals	Apps	Goals	Apps	Goals	Apps	Goals	Apps	Goals	Apps	Goals
Ryutsu Keizai University FC	2015	JFL	1	1	2	0	–		–		–		3	1
Ryutsu Keizai University FC	2018	–			2	0	–		–		–		2	0
Ryutsu Keizai University FC	Total		1	1	4	0	0	0	0	0	0	0	5	1
Kashima Antlers (DSP)	2016	J1 League	0	0	0	0	1	0	0	0	–		1	0
Sint-Truiden	2018–19	Belgian First Division A	0	0	0	0	0	0	0	0	–		0	0
Kashima Antlers (loan)	2019	J1 League	14	2	3	0	4	0	0	0	–		21	2
Cerezo Osaka	2020	J1 League	4	0	0	0	1	0	0	0	–		5	0
Cerezo Osaka	2021	J1 League	5	0	1	0	1	0	2 (Note: Appearances in AFC Champions League Elite)	0	–		9	0
Cerezo Osaka	Total		9	0	1	0	2	0	2	0	0	0	14	0
Yokohama F. Marinos	2022	J1 League	8	1	2	1	2	0	2	0	–		14	2
Yokohama F. Marinos	2023	J1 League	3	0	2	0	3	0	0	0	–		8	0
Yokohama F. Marinos	2024	J1 League	1	0	3	0	2	0	0	0	–		6	0
Yokohama F. Marinos	Total		12	1	7	1	7	0	2	0	0	0	28	2
Vissel Kobe	2025	J1 League	0	0	0	0	–		1	0	1 (Note: Appearance in Japanese Super Cup)	0	2	0
Tochigi City	2026	J2/J3 (100)	11	0	–		–		–		–		11	0
Career total			47	4	15	1	14	0	5	0	1	0	82	5

== Honours ==
=== Club ===
Yokohama F. Marinos

- J1 League: 2022
