= Kaina Yoshio =

Japanese footballer

Kaina Yoshio 吉尾 海夏
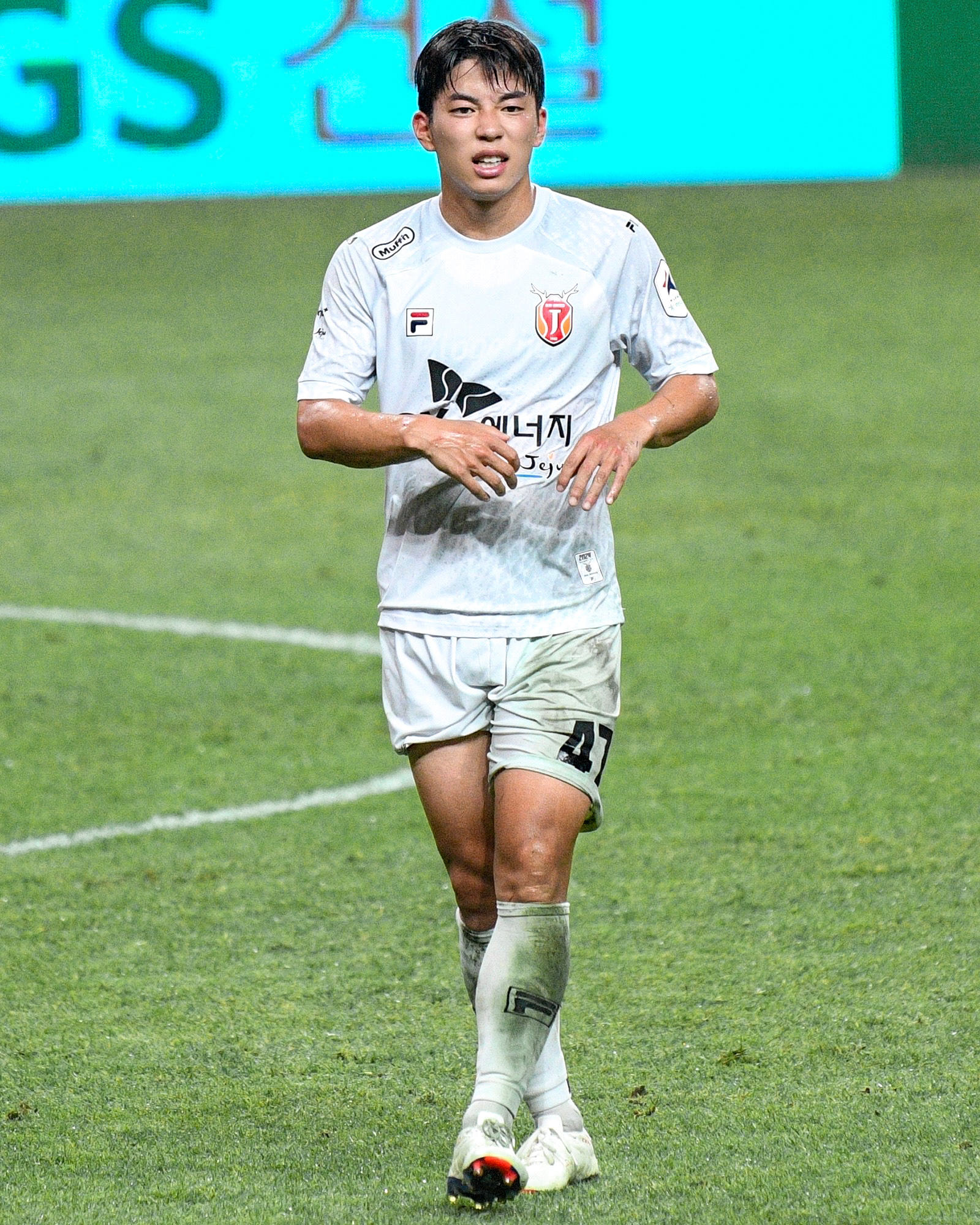
- Yoshio in 2024

Personal information
- Date of birth: 28 June 1998 (age 28)
- Place of birth: Hyōgo, Japan
- Height: 1.67 m (5 ft 6 in)
- Position: Right winger

Team information
- Current team: Montedio Yamagata
- Number: 20

Youth career
- Yokohama F. Marinos

Senior career*
Years	Team	Apps	(Gls)
2017–2024	Yokohama F. Marinos	30	(2)
2019	→ Vegalta Sendai (loan)	13	(2)
2020–2021	→ Machida Zelvia (loan)	72	(14)
2024	→ Jeju SK (loan)	18	(1)
2025–	Montedio Yamagata	19	(1)

International career
2017	Japan U-19	3	(0)
Medal record
Yokohama F. Marinos
Runner-up	J.League Cup	2018
Runner-up	Emperor's Cup	2017
- * Club domestic league appearances and goals as of 13 August 2026

Kaina Yoshio (吉尾 海夏, born 28 June 1998) is a Japanese footballer who plays as a right-winger for Montedio Yamagata in J2 League.

== Club career ==
On 15 March 2017, Yoshio made his professional debut in J.League Cup against Cerezo Osaka.

== Career statistics ==
As of match played 6 April 2019

Appearances and goals by club, season and competition
Club	Season	League			Emperor's Cup		J.League Cup		Total	
Club	Season	Division	Apps	Goals	Apps	Goals	Apps	Goals	Apps	Goals
Yokohama F. Marinos	2017	J1 League	0	0	0	0	5	1	5	1
Yokohama F. Marinos	2018	J1 League	6	0	1	0	6	0	13	0
Vegalta Sendai (loan)	2019	J1 League	4	0	0	0	2	0	6	0
Career total			10	0	1	0	13	1	24	1

== Honours ==
=== Club ===
Yokohama F. Marinos

- J1 League: 2022
