= United Arab Emirates floods =

United Arab Emirates floods may refer to:

- 2022 United Arab Emirates floods
- 2024 United Arab Emirates floods
