= Abdulla Al Mandous =

Emirati meteorologist

Abdulla Ahmed Al Mandous
- Born: November 16, 1966 (age 59); United Arab Emirates
- Education: Saint Louis University (BSc); University of the Witwatersrand (MSc); University of Belgrade (PhD)
- Occupations: President of WMO and Director General of the National Center of Meteorology

Abdulla Ahmed Al Mandous (Arabic: عبد الله أحمد المندوس) is the current President of WMO. Al Mandous was elected as WMO president for a four-year term from 2023 to 2027 by the representatives of WMO's 193 member states and territories which convened in Geneva for the body's 19th annual congress from 22 May to 2 June 2023. Al Mandous is also Director General of the National Center of Meteorology (NCM), the government entity that provides meteorological and seismological services and statistical data and information to various entities and the public in the United Arab Emirates to carry out their daily functions.

== Studies ==
Al Mandous studied meteorology at the Saint Louis University in the United States and earned a Bachelor of Science degree in 1989. Later, he pursued post-graduate studies in meteorology at the University of Witwatersrand in South Africa and earned a Master of Science degree in 2005. He was awarded a PhD in Meteorology by The University of Belgrade, Serbia in 2012.

== Career ==
=== National Center of Meteorology ===
Prior to his current roles, Al Mandous held several leadership positions for nearly two decades at several top governmental bodies responsible for atmospheric and seismographic monitoring and water resource management including Atmospheric Studies Center, Water Resources Studies Department, National Project of United Nations Development Programme for Water Sources Studies, Precipitation Enhancement Program, among others.

Al Mandous is the current Director General of the National Center of Meteorology (NCM) and the Permanent Representative of the United Arab Emirates (UAE) to the World Meteorological Organisation (WMO) since 2008. At NCM, he undertook a large-scale modernization of its infrastructure, as well as its meteorological and seismological networks. During his tenure, the radar network has been integrated to the others of the Arabian Peninsula and is contributing to disaster management, water security and International Civil Aviation Organization’s Global Air Navigation Plan 2013-2028. His efforts to unify the seismic engineering services and exchanging data is favoring the integration at the regional and international levels. Al Mandous participated to set up The UAE Research Program for Rain Enhancement Science, which was launched under the patronage of Sheikh Mansour bin Zayed Al Nahyan, UAE Vice President, Deputy Prime Minister and Minister of Presidential Affairs in 2015. The program aims to attract new researchers, technologists and entrepreneurs to further develop local and global capacity in rain enhancement to address the most pressing water-security challenges.

In July 2021, NCM launched under the direct supervision of Al Mandous the Science Dome, a high-tech 4D dome to visualise real-time and simulate weather data to help visitors understand the details of meteorology, geophysics and cloud seeding operations in an innovative way.

=== WMO ===
Al Mandous assumed the leadership of WMO Regional Association II (Asia), chaired several sessions of the WMO’s Regional Association of ASIA and guided and coordinated the activities of the association and its working groups. He presented the views of the Association to WMO Congress and Executive Council on regional challenges and priorities in the implementation of meteorological activities.

Al Mandous was elected as WMO president for a four-year term from 2023 to 2027 by the representatives of WMO's 193 member states and territories which convened in Geneva for the body's 19th annual congress from 22 May to 2 June, 2023. Following his election as the first Gulf meteorologist chosen for the position of WMO president, Al Mandous vowed to help guide global efforts to combat pressing climate challenges by saying:

With the continued support of all members, I look forward to building upon the remarkable work of my predecessors and strengthening WMO's role in accelerating the development of comprehensive early warning systems, advancing scientific research, and ensuring the effective dissemination of weather-related information to communities around the world.

== Board memberships ==
Al Mandous serves on numerous local, regional and international boards, providing advice on issues related to weather monitoring and forecasting, water resource management, crisis management, among others. Some of these boards include:

- Executive council of UN-World Meteorological Organization
- The National Center Meteorology Council at Ministry of Presidential Affairs
- The Crisis and Emergency Management Committee
- Union Aviation Council of UAE
- Gulf Union for Water Science and Technology Council
- Member of the Advisory Board of the College of Science, United Arab Emirates University

== Highlight of honours received ==
- The Emirates Award Certificate of Appreciation from His Highness Sheikh Mansour bin Zayed Al Nahyan for enhanced and improved weather and climate services at UAE
- Kuwait Liberation Medal (Kuwait) Recipient from Emir of Kuwait
- Certificate of Appreciation from the National Center for Atmospheric Research, NCAR, United States for UAE Rain Enhancement Project
- Middle East Executive Award for High level Executive Leadership.
