= 2024 United Arab Emirates floods =

Natural disaster in United Arab Emirates

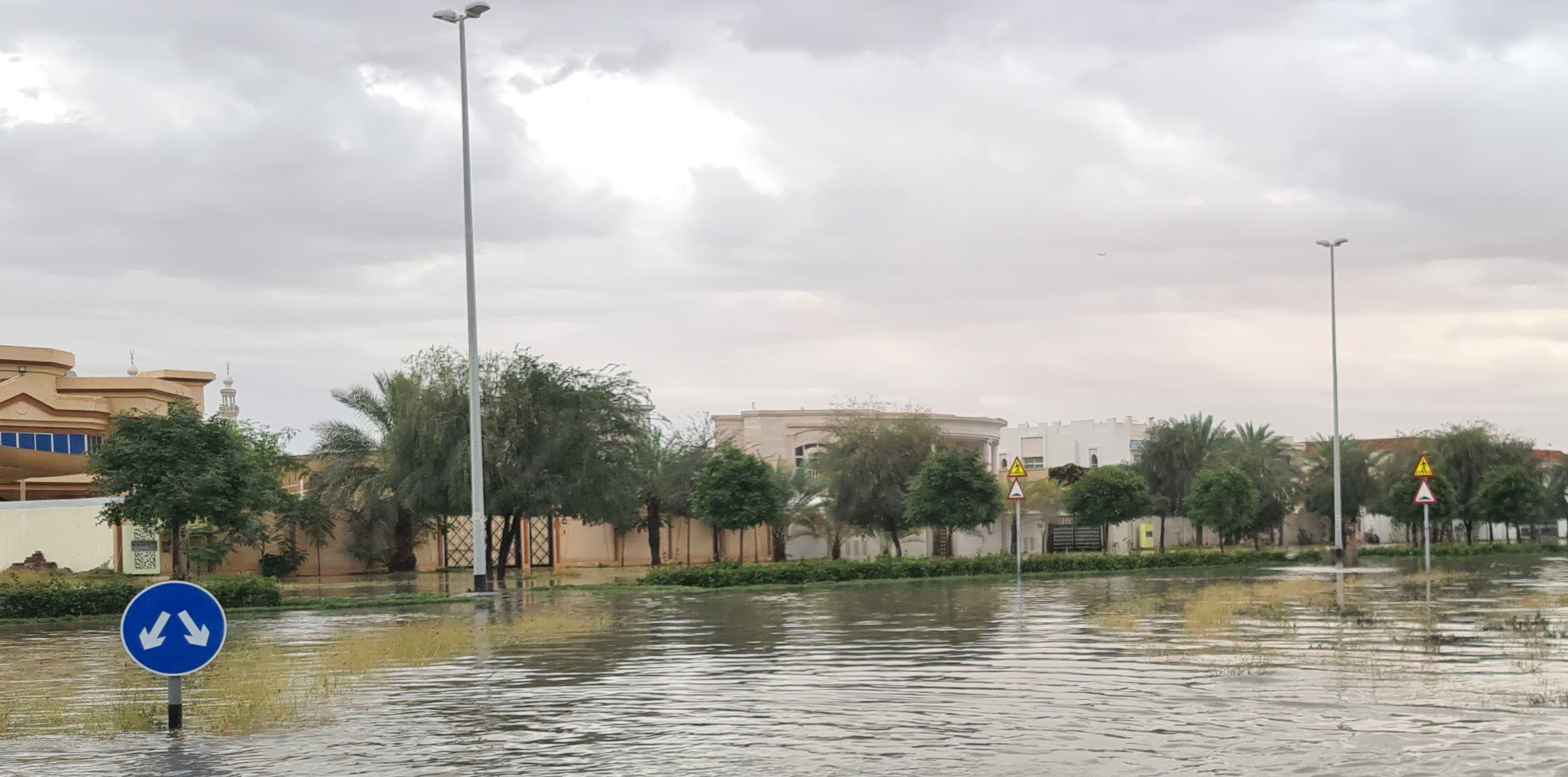
- Flood View at Al Mizhar in Dubai
- Date: 16 April 2024
- Location: Dubai, Sharjah, Ajman, Abu Dhabi and the Emirate of Ras Al Khaimah
- Cause: Heavy rains
- Deaths: 5
- Property damage: US$2.9–3.4 billion

GFS weather model forecast initiated on April 13 showing the expected rainfall totals for the next 162 hours due to the impact of a trough that will cause the 2024 Persian Gulf floods

On 16 April 2024, heavy rains caused floods in the United Arab Emirates, affected cities of mainly Dubai and Sharjah, the northern Emirates, and various areas of the Emirate of Ras Al Khaimah. According to the National Center for Meteorology (United Arab Emirates), this was the country's heaviest rainfall recorded in 75 years. The floods in the Emirates were a part of the greater Persian Gulf floods.

== The storm ==
The rains began in UAE late on Monday, 15 April 2024, intensifying the next day on Tuesday, 16 April 2024, and officially concluding on Wednesday, 17 April 2024. The UAE witnessed a record-breaking rainfall in a 24 hour period, surpassing Emirati meteorological data since records began in 1949. According to the National Centre of Meteorology, the highest rainfall was recorded in the Khatm Al Shakla area in Al Ain, reaching 254.8 mm (10.03 in) in less than 24 hours. Widespread flooding was reported in all seven emirates. Ahead of the flooding, an estimated rainfall of 40 mm (1.6 in), up to 100 mm (3.9 in) was estimated in some parts of the UAE.

== Impact ==
Five people were confirmed dead; Three Filipinos, an Emirati elderly man, and a Pakistani man in his 50s who drowned after the municipality tanker he was driving was swept into a wadi. Guy Carpenter estimated the insurance loss was US$2.9–3.4 billion.

=== Transit ===
Dubai Metro services were severely impacted, leaving around 200 commuters stranded at several stations. MA highway through Dubai was reduced to a single lane in one direction, while the E11 Road that connects Dubai with the capital Abu Dhabi was closed in the Abu Dhabi direction. Intercity bus service on the Dubai - Abu Dhabi, Dubai - Sharjah, and Dubai - Ajman routes were suspended

A total of 1,244 flights at Dubai International Airport were cancelled over a two-day period with 41 diverted. All Flydubai flights scheduled for departure on 16 April from Dubai were cancelled. At the Dubai airport, a total of 164 mm (6.45 in) of rain fell.

Images from the U.S. Geological Survey showing the city of Dubai and surrounding area on April 3 and April 19, before and after the storms.

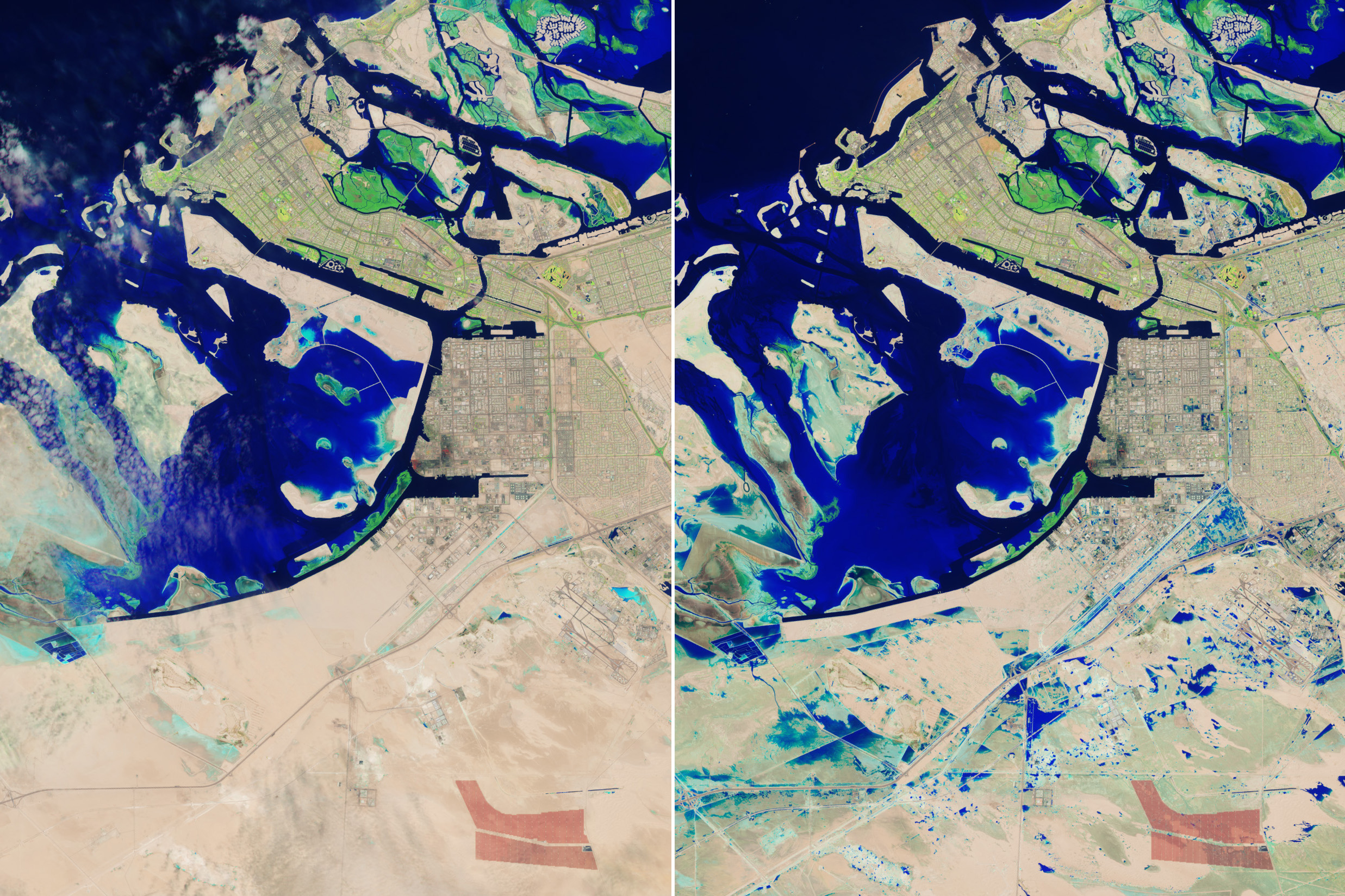
Images from the U.S. Geological Survey showing the city of Abu Dhabi and surrounding area on April 3 (left) and April 19 (right), before and after the storms.

== Cause ==
The cause of this flooding was mainly due to a trough along with the Sudan low, a low pressure system centered on Sudan, originating from the Intertropical Convergence Zone. Climate change reduced the temperature gradient between the equator and the North Pole, causing the subtropical jet stream to slow down. This made the cooler air move southward more easily, and thus resulted in more frequent and stronger trough formation in the area. The trough formed over the northeastern Mediterranean Sea, then after moving southward and combining with the Sudan low, transformed from a thermodynamic low pressure system to a dynamic low pressure system. The low pressure system then collected a massive amount of warm and moist air from nearby bodies of water, which were warmer than usual because of climate change. Thus, the warm air ascended and condensed, leading to a downpour and consequently, the resulting flooding.

== Response ==
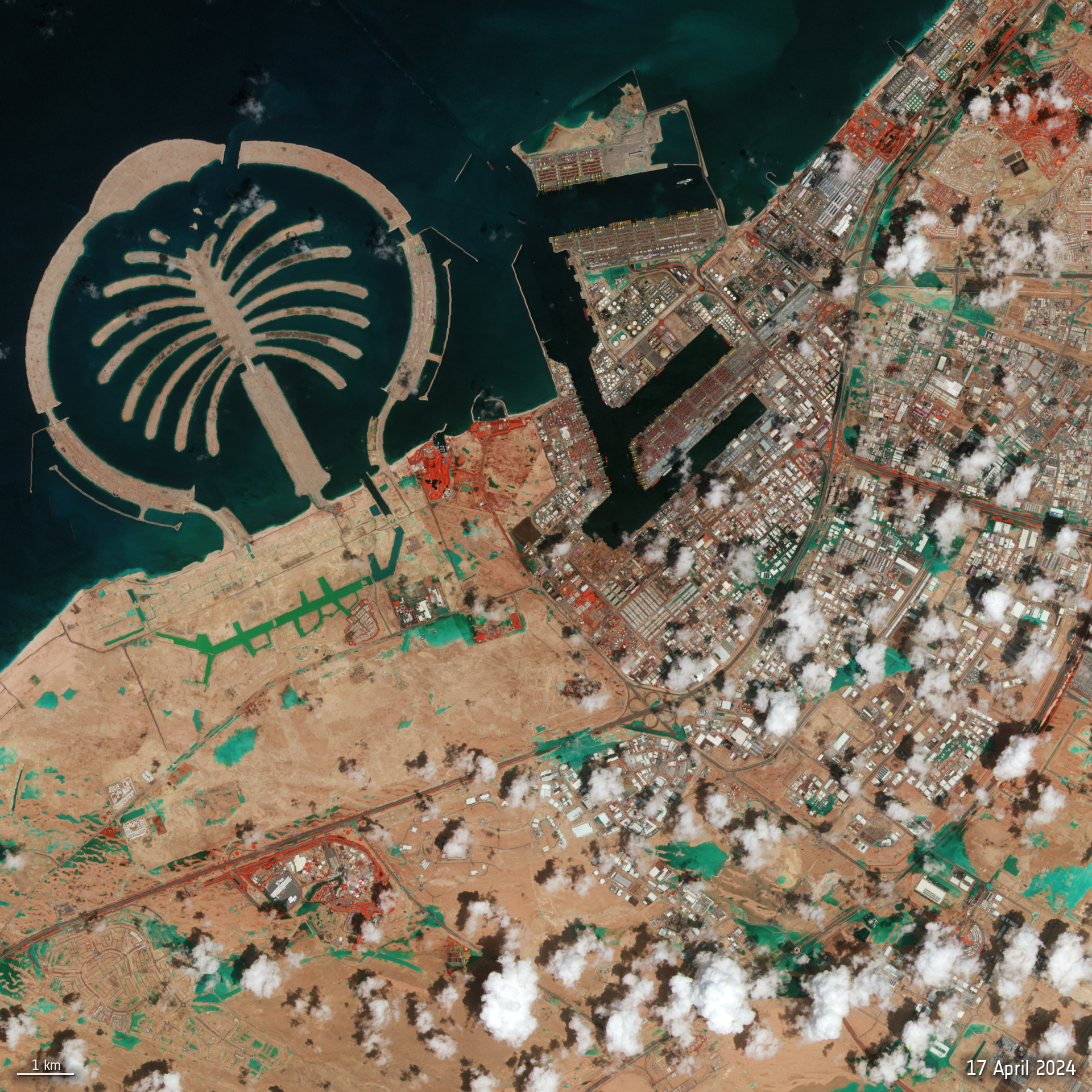
Dubai floods seen from space - 17 April 2024

The Emirati National Center for Meteorology had issued various orange and yellow warnings for heavy rainfall and strong winds.

The United Arab Emirates' National Meteorological Center issued a red weather alert and, in addition to the core response, government employees were advised to work from home in the immediate aftermath of the floods while the guidance for private organizations showed the same. Some schools and colleges were also closed during the flooding. In Sharjah, many heavy machinery companies provided equipment to aid in clearing the streets and repair in response to the heavy flooding with various machinery such as wheel loaders, skid steer loaders, forklifts, and street sweepers, to help move stranded vehicles, clear debris, and expedite the drying process.

The United Arab Emirates announced 2 billion dirhams (US$544.6 million) to deal with damage to flooded homes.

Authorities declared that posting false news, fake images or rumors about the floods were criminal offenses under the country's cybercrime laws.

== See also ==
- 2022 United Arab Emirates floods
- 2024 Persian Gulf floods
- National Center for Meteorology (United Arab Emirates)
