= 2023–24 AFC Champions League =

42nd edition of premier club football tournament organized by the AFC

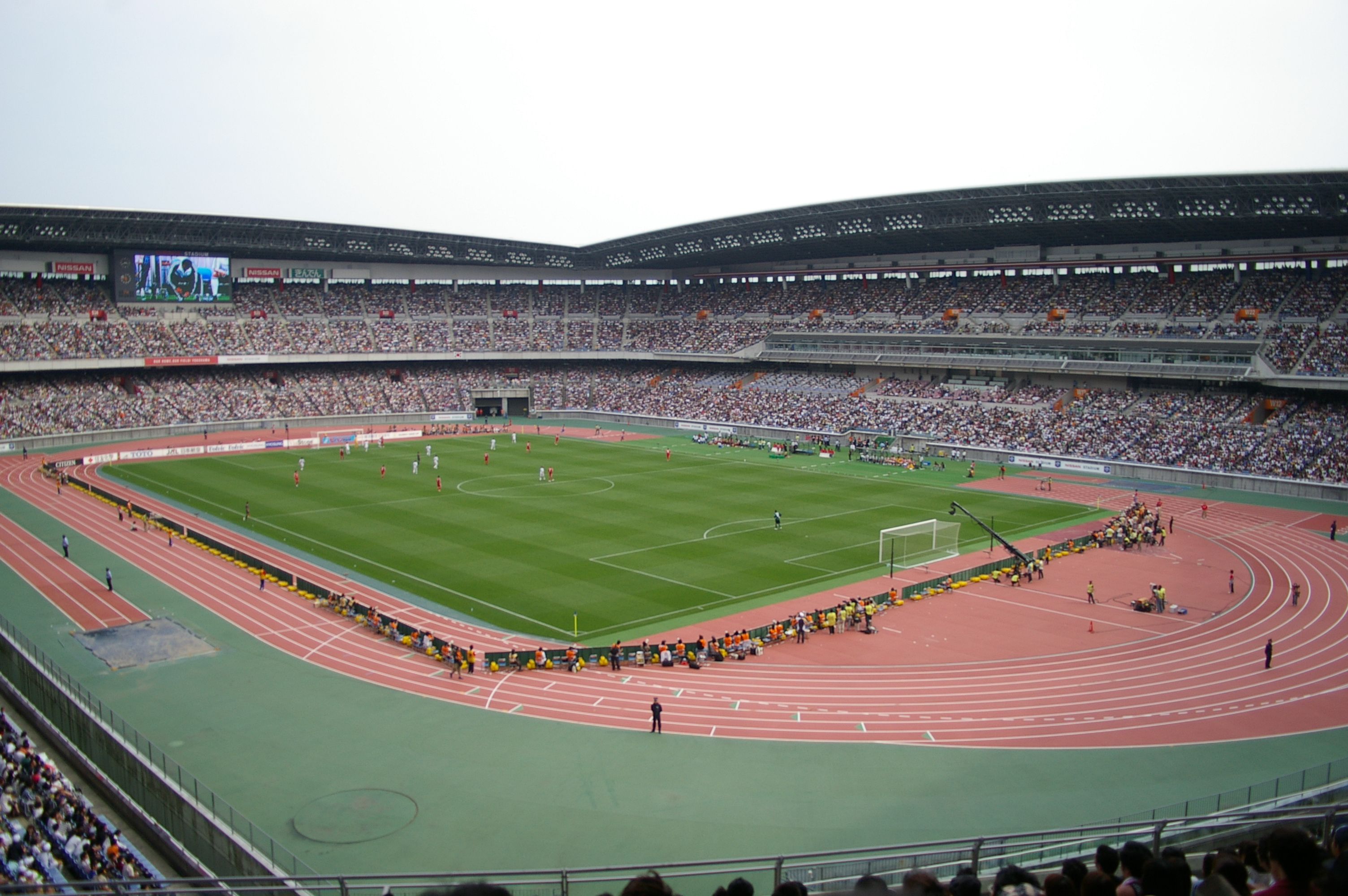
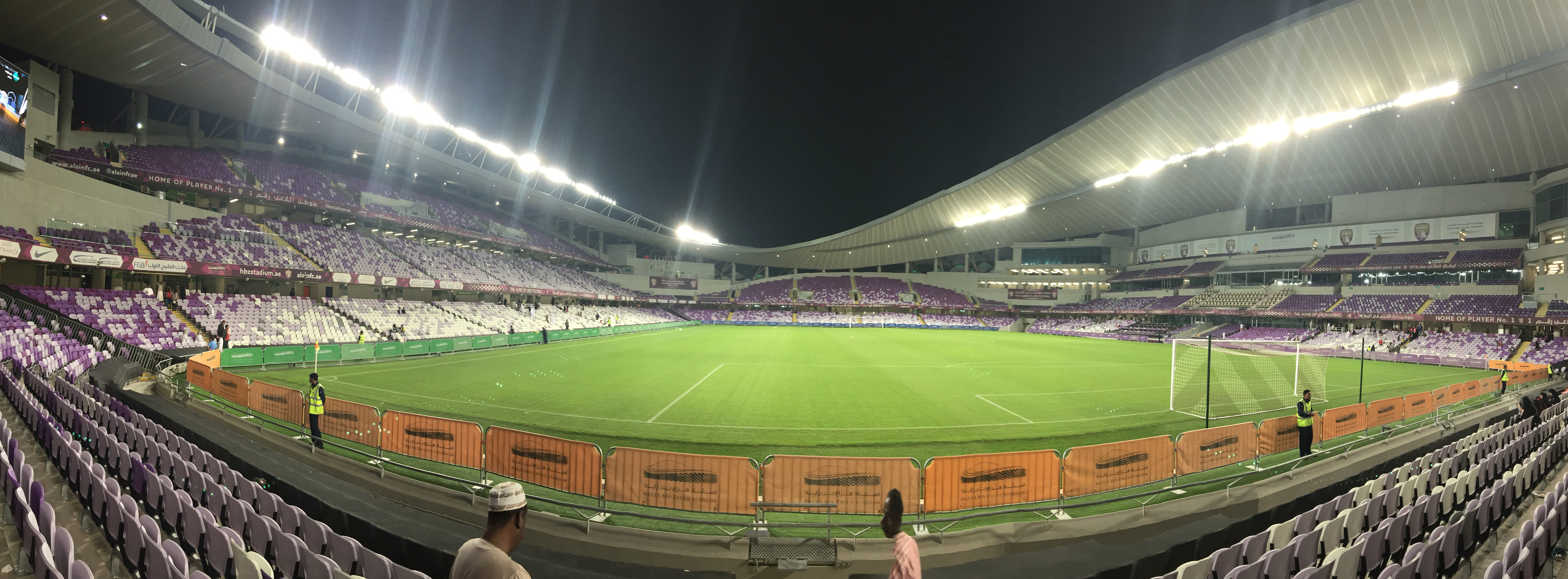
- Nissan Stadium in Yokohama (top) and Hazza Bin Zayed Stadium in Al Ain (bottom), venues for the final

Tournament details
- Dates: Qualifying: 15–22 August 2023; Competition proper: 18 September 2023 – 25 May 2024
- Teams: Competition proper: 40 (from 20 associations); Total (maximum): 53 (from 23 associations)

Final positions
- Champions: (United Arab Emirates) Al Ain (2nd title)
- Runners-up: (Japan) Yokohama F. Marinos

Tournament statistics
- Matches played: 150
- Goals scored: 471 (3.14 per match)
- Attendance: 1,849,650 (12,331 per match)
- Top scorer: Soufiane Rahimi (13 goals)
- Best player: Soufiane Rahimi

The 2023–24 AFC Champions League was the 42nd edition of Asia's premier club football tournament organized by the Asian Football Confederation (AFC), and the 21st and final under the AFC Champions League title, as the competition would be rebranded as the AFC Champions League Elite starting in 2024–25.

This season was the first to have an inter-year schedule from September (autumn-to-spring), instead of an intra-year schedule (spring-to-autumn), since the 2002–03 season. This edition saw an increase in numbers of preliminary players, with 35 players able to be registered; teams were able to field six foreign players in games, where one of these players had to still be from another Asian nation.

The tournament winner qualified for the 2024 FIFA Intercontinental Cup and 2025 FIFA Club World Cup in the United States. Additionally, the winner entered the League stage of the brand-new 2024–25 AFC Champions League Elite if they had not already qualified through their domestic performance.

Urawa Red Diamonds of Japan were the defending champions, but were eliminated in the group stage.

== Association team allocation ==
The 47 AFC member associations were ranked based on their clubs' performance over the last four years in AFC competitions (their national team's FIFA World Rankings no longer considered). The slots were allocated by the following criteria according to the Entry Manual:

- The associations were split into two regions (Article 3.1):
  - West Region consisted of the 25 associations from the West Asian Football Federation (WAFF), the South Asian Football Federation (SAFF), and the Central Asian Football Association (CAFA).
  - East Region consisted of the 22 associations from the ASEAN Football Federation (AFF) and the East Asian Football Federation (EAFF).
  - The AFC could reallocate one or more associations to another region if necessary for sporting reasons.
- The top 12 associations in each region could enter the AFC Champions League.
- In each region, five groups were in the group stage, including 16 direct slots, with the four remaining filled through qualifying play-offs (Article 3.2). The slots in each region were distributed as follows:
  - The associations ranked 1st and 2nd were each allocated three direct slots and one play-off slot.
  - The associations ranked 3rd and 4th were each allocated two direct slots and two play-off slots.
  - The association ranked 5th was allocated one direct slot and two play-off slots.
  - The association ranked 6th was allocated one direct slot and one play-off slot.
  - The associations ranked 7th to 10th were each allocated one direct slot.
  - The associations ranked 11th and 12th were each allocated one play-off slot.
- The AFC Champions League title holders and AFC Cup title holders were each allocated one play-off slot had they not qualified for the tournament through domestic performance (Article 3.6). The following rules were applied:
  - If the AFC Champions League title holders or AFC Cup title holders were from associations ranked 1st to 6th, their association was allocated the same number of play-off slots, and they replace the lowest-seeded team from their association. Otherwise, their association was allocated one additional play-off slot, and they did not replace any team from their association (Articles 3.8, 3.9, and 3.10).
  - If both the AFC Champions League title holders and AFC Cup title holders were from the same association, which was allocated only one play-off slot, their association was allocated one additional play-off slot, and only the lowest-seeded team from their association was replaced as a result (Article 3.11).
  - The AFC Champions League and AFC Cup title holders were the lowest-seeded teams in the qualifying play-offs if they did not replace any team from their association (Article 3.12).
- If any association ranked 1st to 6th did not fulfill the AFC Champions League criteria, they would have all their direct slots converted into play-off slots. The direct slots given up would be redistributed to the highest eligible association by the following criteria (Articles 3.13 and 3.14):
  - For each association, the maximum number of total slots was four, and the maximum number of direct slots was three (Articles 3.4 and 3.5).
  - If any association ranked 3rd to 6th was allocated one additional direct slot, one play-off slot was annulled and not redistributed.
  - If any association ranked 5th to 6th was allocated two additional direct slots, one play-off slot was annulled and not redistributed.
- If any association ranked 7th to 10th did not fulfill the AFC Champions League criteria, they had their direct slot converted into a playoff slot. The direct slot given up was redistributed to the next association ranked 11th or 12th, whose play-off slot was annulled and not redistributed, or if neither was eligible, the highest eligible association by the same criteria mentioned above (Articles 3.16 and 3.17).
- If any association with only play-off slot(s), including any association ranked 11th to 12th or those mentioned above, did not fulfill the minimum AFC Champions League criteria, the play-off slot(s) was annulled and not redistributed (Articles 3.19 and 3.20).
- The maximum number of total slots for each association was one-third of eligible teams (excluding foreign teams) in the top division (Article 3.4). If this rule was applied, any direct slots given up would be redistributed by the same criteria as mentioned above, and play-off slots would be annulled and not redistributed (Article 9.10).
- All participating teams had to be granted an AFC Champions League license and, apart from cup winners, finish in the top half of their top division (Articles 7.1 and 9.5). In the case that any association did not have enough teams that satisfied this criterion, any direct slots given up would be redistributed by the abovementioned criteria, and play-off slots would be annulled and not redistributed (Article 9.9).
- If any team granted a license refused to participate, their direct or play-off slot was annulled and not redistributed (Article 9.11).

=== Association ranking ===
For the 2023–24 AFC Champions League, the associations were allocated slots according to the November 2021 AFC club competitions ranking, which took into account their performance in the AFC Champions League and the AFC Cup during the period between 2018 and 2021.

Participation for 2023–24 AFC Champions League
Participating
Not participating

West Region (5 groups)
Rank		Member association	Points	Slots	
Rank		Member association	Points	Group stage	Play-off
Region	AFC	Member association	Points	Group stage	Play-off
1	1	Saudi Arabia	100.000	3	1
2	4	Iran	77.792	3	1
3	5	Qatar	75.131	2	2
4	6	Uzbekistan	64.712	2	2
5	8	United Arab Emirates	52.588	1	2
6	10	Jordan	46.131	1	1
7	12	Tajikistan	37.323	1	0
8	13	Iraq	35.223	1	0
9	16	Turkmenistan	27.871	1	0
10	17	India	25.290	1	0
11	18	Lebanon	23.618	0	0
12	21	Bangladesh	19.452	0	1
13	34	Oman	5.264	0	~~0~~ (+1 AFC)
Total		Participating associations: 12		16	11
Total		Participating associations: 12		27	

East Region (5 groups)
Rank		Member association	Points	Slots	
Rank		Member association	Points	Group stage	Play-off
Region	AFC	Member association	Points	Group stage	Play-off
1	2	South Korea	95.462	3	1
2	3	Japan	93.412	3	1
3	7	China	59.948	2	2
4	9	Thailand	51.920	2	2
5	11	Hong Kong	40.925	1	2
6	14	Vietnam	34.937	1	1
7	15	North Korea	32.286	0	0
8	19	Philippines	23.080	1	0
9	20	Malaysia	21.087	1	0
10	23	Australia	17.277	1	0
11	24	Singapore	17.016	1	0
12	26	Indonesia	15.960	0	1
Total		Participating associations: 11		16	10
Total		Participating associations: 11		26	

Notes

1. Competition in 2020: The 2020 season was not included in the overall ranking due to the cancellation of the remaining matches in the 2020 AFC Cup caused by the COVID-19 pandemic.

== Teams ==
In the following table, the number of appearances and last appearance count only those since the 2002–03 season (including qualifying rounds), when the competition was rebranded as the AFC Champions League.

Entry round	West Region			East Region		
Group stage	Team	Qualifying method	App. (last)	Team	Qualifying method	App. (last)
Group stage	(Saudi Arabia) Al-Hilal	2021–22 Saudi Pro League champions	19th (2022)	(South Korea) Ulsan Hyundai	2022 K League 1 champions	11th (2022)
Group stage	(Saudi Arabia) Al-Ittihad	2022–23 Saudi Pro League champions	12th (2019)	(South Korea) Jeonbuk Hyundai Motors	2022 Korean FA Cup winners	16th (2022)
Group stage	(Saudi Arabia) Al-Fayha	2021–22 King Cup winners	1st	(South Korea) Pohang Steelers	2022 K League 1 third place	9th (2021)
Group stage	(Iran) Persepolis	2022–23 Persian Gulf Pro League champions	11th (2021)	(Japan) Yokohama F. Marinos	2022 J1 League champions	6th (2022)
Group stage	(Iran) Nassaji	2021–22 Hazfi Cup winners	1st	(Japan) Ventforet Kofu	2022 Emperor's Cup winners	1st
Group stage	(Iran) Sepahan	2022–23 Persian Gulf Pro League runners-up	14th (2022)	(Japan) Kawasaki Frontale	2022 J1 League runners-up	10th (2022)
Group stage	(Qatar) Al-Sadd	2021–22 Qatar Stars League champions	18th (2022)	(China) Wuhan Three Towns	2022 Chinese Super League champions	1st
Group stage	(Qatar) Al-Duhail	2022–23 Qatar Stars League champions	12th (2022)	(China) Shandong Taishan	2022 Chinese FA Cup winners	11th (2022)
Group stage	(Uzbekistan) Pakhtakor	2022 Uzbekistan Super League champions	19th (2022)	(Thailand) Buriram United	2021–22 Thai League 1 champions and 2022–23 Thai League 1 champions	11th (2022)
Group stage	(Uzbekistan) Nasaf	2022 Uzbekistan Cup winners	8th (2022)	(Thailand) Bangkok United	2022–23 Thai League 1 runners-up	4th (2019)
Group stage	(United Arab Emirates) Al-Ain	2021–22 UAE Pro League champions	17th (2021)	(Hong Kong) Kitchee	2022–23 Hong Kong Premier League champions	8th (2022)
Group stage	(Jordan) Al-Faisaly	2022 Jordanian Pro League champions	4th (2020)	(Vietnam) Hanoi	2022 V.League 1 champions	6th (2019)
Group stage	(Tajikistan) Istiklol	2022 Tajikistan Higher League champions	5th (2022)	(Philippines) Kaya–Iloilo	2022–23 Philippines Football League champions	3rd (2022)
Group stage	(Iraq) Al-Quwa Al-Jawiya	2022–23 Iraqi Premier League runners-up	7th (2022)	(Malaysia) Johor Darul Ta'zim	2022 Malaysia Super League champions	9th (2022)
Group stage	(Turkmenistan) Ahal Änew	2022 Ýokary Liga champions	2nd (2022)	(Australia) Melbourne City	2021–22 A-League Men premiers 2022–23 A-League Men premiers	2nd (2022)
Group stage	(India) Mumbai City	Winners of additional playoff between 2021–22 and 2022–23 Indian Super League league shield winners	2nd (2022)	(Singapore) Lion City Sailors	2022 Singapore Premier League runners-up	4th (2022)
Play-off round	(Saudi Arabia) Al-Nassr	2022–23 Saudi Pro League runners-up	7th (2021)	(South Korea) Incheon United	2022 K League 1 fourth place	1st
Play-off round	(Iran) Tractor	2022–23 Persian Gulf Pro League fourth place	7th (2021)	(Japan) Urawa Red Diamonds	2022 AFC Champions League winners	9th (2022)
Play-off round	(Qatar) Al-Arabi	2022–23 Qatar Stars League runners-up	2nd (2012)	(China) Zhejiang	2022 Chinese Super League third place	2nd (2011)
Play-off round	(Qatar) Al-Wakrah	2021–22 Qatar Stars League third place	1st	(China) Shanghai Port	2022 Chinese Super League fourth place	8th (2022)
Play-off round	(Uzbekistan) Navbahor	2022 Uzbekistan Super League runners-up	1st	(Thailand) BG Pathum United	2021–22 Thai League 1 runners-up	4th (2022)
Play-off round				(Thailand) Port	2022–23 Thai League 1 third place	4th (2022)
Preliminary round	(Uzbekistan) AGMK	2022 Uzbekistan Super League fourth place	3rd (2021)	(Hong Kong) Lee Man	2022–23 Hong Kong Premier League runners-up	1st
Preliminary round	(United Arab Emirates) Sharjah	2022–23 UAE President's Cup winners	6th (2022)	(Hong Kong) Rangers	2022–23 Hong Kong Premier League third place	1st
Preliminary round	(United Arab Emirates) Shabab Al-Ahli	2022–23 UAE Pro League champions	11th (2022)	(Vietnam) Haiphong	2022 V.League 1 runners-up	1st
Preliminary round	(Jordan) Al-Wehdat	2022 Jordan FA Cup winners	8th (2022)	(Indonesia) Bali United	Winners of additional playoff between 2021–22 and 2022–23 Liga 1 champions	3rd (2020)
Preliminary round	(Bangladesh) Bashundhara Kings	2021–22 Bangladesh Premier League champions	1st			
Preliminary round	(Oman) Al-Seeb	2022 AFC Cup winners	1st			

Notes

1. Iraq (IRQ): The 2022–23 Iraqi Premier League champions Al-Shorta were not granted an AFC Champions League license.
2. Uzbekistan (UZB): Nasaf Qarshi, the winners of the 2022 Uzbekistan Cup, was already qualified directly to the group stage. Thus, fourth-placed AGMK qualified for the qualifying play-offs.
3. South Korea (KOR): Jeonbuk Hyundai Motors was already qualified as the 2022 K League 1 runners-up when they won the 2022 Korean FA Cup. Thus, third-placed Pohang Steelers qualified directly to the group stage, while the fourth-placed Incheon United qualified for the qualifying play-offs.
4. Japan (JPN): Urawa Red Diamonds qualified as the winners of the 2022 AFC Champions League, replacing Sanfrecce Hiroshima (the third-placed team of the 2022 J1 League).
5. Singapore (SIN): Albirex Niigata (S), the 2022 Singapore Premier League champions, were a team from Japan and thus ineligible to represent Singapore in AFC club competitions. As a result, Lion City Sailors, the Singapore Premier League runners-up, qualified for the Champions League.
6. Thailand (THA): Due to changing the competition date to autumn–spring format, the Thai League decided to split their 2+2 quota to take 1+1 over the next two seasons. This meant that only the winners of the 2021–22 Thai League 1 and the winners of the 2022–23 Thai League 1 would qualify directly for the group stage, while the winners of the 2021–22 Thai FA Cup and the winners of the 2022–23 Thai FA Cup would qualify for the qualifying play-off. As the 2021–22 Thai League 1 champions Buriram United also won the 2021–22 Thai FA Cup, the slot reserved for the cup winners of the 2021–22 season went to the season's league runners-up BG Pathum United. Since they also won both the 2022–23 Thai League 1 and the 2022–23 Thai FA Cup, the slot reserved for these two spots went to that season's league runners-up Bangkok United and third-placed team Port.
7. Australia (AUS): Due to the change of the competition date to the autumn–spring format, the Australian Professional Leagues modified the criteria for qualification so that the solitary qualifier was whichever of the A-League Men premiers for the 2021–22 or the 2022–23 season accrued the most combined points over both seasons. Melbourne City were premiers for both seasons.
8. Hong Kong (HKG): Since the 2022–23 Hong Kong Premier League winners Kitchee already directly qualified for the group stage as the league winners and 2022–23 Hong Kong FA Cup winners, league third-place BC Rangers qualified for the qualifying play-offs.
9. Vietnam (VIE): Since the 2022 Vietnamese Cup winners Hanoi already directly qualified for the group stage as the league winners, league runners-up Haiphong qualified for the qualifying play-offs.

== Schedule ==
The schedule of the competition was as follows.

Stage	Round	Draw date	First leg	Second leg
Preliminary stage	Preliminary round	No draw	15–16 August 2023	
Play-off stage	Play-off round	No draw	22 August 2023	
Group stage	Matchday 1	24 August 2023	18–20 September 2023	
Group stage	Matchday 2	24 August 2023	2–4 October 2023	
Group stage	Matchday 3	24 August 2023	23–25 October 2023	
Group stage	Matchday 4	24 August 2023	6–8 November 2023	
Group stage	Matchday 5	24 August 2023	27–29 November 2023	
Group stage	Matchday 6	24 August 2023	4–6 & 12–13 December 2023	
Knockout stage	Round of 16	28 December 2023	13–15 February 2024	20–22 February 2024
Knockout stage	Quarter-finals	28 December 2023	4–6 March 2024	11–13 March 2024
Knockout stage	Semi-finals	28 December 2023	17 April 2024	23–24 April 2024
Knockout stage	Final	28 December 2023	11 May 2024	25 May 2024

== Qualifying play-offs ==
=== Preliminary round ===
A total of 10 teams played in the preliminary round.

Team 1	Score	Team 2
West Region
Shabab Al-Ahli (United Arab Emirates)	3–0	(Jordan) Al-Wehdat
Sharjah (United Arab Emirates)	2–0	(Bangladesh) Bashundhara Kings
AGMK (Uzbekistan)	1–0	(Oman) Al-Seeb
East Region
Rangers (Hong Kong)	1–4 (a.e.t.)	(Vietnam) Haiphong
Lee Man (Hong Kong)	5–1	(Indonesia) Bali United

=== Play-off round ===
A total of 16 teams played in the play-off round: 11 teams which entered in this round, and 5 winners of the preliminary round.

Team 1	Score	Team 2
West Region
Al-Nassr (Saudi Arabia)	4–2	(United Arab Emirates) Shabab Al-Ahli
Tractor (Iran)	1–3	(United Arab Emirates) Sharjah
Al-Arabi (Qatar)	0–1	(Uzbekistan) AGMK
Al-Wakrah (Qatar)	0–1 (a.e.t.)	(Uzbekistan) Navbahor
East Region
Incheon United (South Korea)	3–1 (a.e.t.)	(Vietnam) Haiphong
Urawa Red Diamonds (Japan)	3–0	(Hong Kong) Lee Man
Zhejiang (China)	1–0	(Thailand) Port
Shanghai Port (China)	2–3	(Thailand) BG Pathum United

== Group stage ==
The draw for the group stage was held on 24 August 2023 at the AFC House in Kuala Lumpur, Malaysia. The 40 teams were drawn into ten groups of four: five groups each in the West Region (Groups A–E) and the East Region (Groups F–J). For each region, teams were seeded into four pots and drawn into the relevant positions within each group, based on their association ranking and their seeding within their association, in consideration of the technical balance between groups. Teams from the same association could not be drawn into the same group.

Location of the 2023–24 AFC Champions League group stage teams
Brown: Group A; Cyan: Group B; Orange: Group C; Yellow: Group D; Pink: Group E;
Green: Group F; Blue: Group G; Red: Group H; Turquoise: Group I; Purple: Group J

=== Group A ===
Pos	Team	Pld	W	D	L	GF	GA	GD	Pts	Qualification	AIN	FEI	PAK	AHA
1	(United Arab Emirates) Al-Ain	6	5	0	1	17	9	+8	15	Advance to round of 16	—	4–1	1–3	4–2
2	(Saudi Arabia) Al-Fayha	6	3	0	3	12	10	+2	9	Advance to round of 16	2–3	—	2–0	3–1
3	(Uzbekistan) Pakhtakor	6	2	1	3	8	11	−3	7		0–3	1–4	—	3–0
4	(Turkmenistan) Ahal	6	1	1	4	6	13	−7	4		1–2	1–0	1–1	—

Source: AFC
Rules for classification: Tiebreakers

=== Group B ===
Pos	Team	Pld	W	D	L	GF	GA	GD	Pts	Qualification	NAS	SAD	SHJ	FAI
1	(Uzbekistan) Nasaf	6	3	2	1	10	6	+4	11	Advance to round of 16	—	3–1	1–1	3–1
2	(Qatar) Al Sadd	6	2	2	2	11	7	+4	8 (Note: Ranked on head-to-head points: Al Sadd 4, Sharjah 1.)		2–2	—	0–0	6–0
3	(United Arab Emirates) Sharjah	6	2	2	2	4	5	−1	8		1–0	0–2	—	1–0
4	(Jordan) Al-Faisaly	6	2	0	4	5	12	−7	6		0–1	2–0	2–1	—

Source: AFC
Rules for classification: Tiebreakers

=== Group C ===
Pos	Team	Pld	W	D	L	GF	GA	GD	Pts	Qualification	ITH	SEP	QWJ	AGK
1	(Saudi Arabia) Al-Ittihad	6	5	0	1	11	4	+7	15	Advance to round of 16	—	2–1	1–0	3–0
2	(Iran) Sepahan	6	3	1	2	16	8	+8	10 (Note: Ranked on head-to-head points: Sepahan 4, Al-Quwa Al-Jawiya 1.)	Advance to round of 16	0–3 (Note: The match was abandoned after Al-Ittihad walked off in protest due to the presence of a sculpture of Qasem Soleimani on the pitch. The match was awarded a 3–0 win to Al-Ittihad, with Sepahan also being fined $200,000 and banned from hosting its next three Asian Champions League matches at home.)	—	1–0	9–0
3	(Iraq) Al-Quwa Al-Jawiya	6	3	1	2	9	7	+2	10		2–0	2–2	—	3–2
4	(Uzbekistan) AGMK	6	0	0	6	5	22	−17	0		1–2	1–3	1–2	—

Source: AFC
Rules for classification: Tiebreakers

=== Group D ===
Pos	Team	Pld	W	D	L	GF	GA	GD	Pts	Qualification	HIL	NAV	NAS	MUM
1	(Saudi Arabia) Al-Hilal	6	5	1	0	16	2	+14	16	Advance to round of 16	—	1–1	2–1	6–0
2	(Uzbekistan) Navbahor	6	4	1	1	11	6	+5	13	Advance to round of 16	0–2	—	2–1	3–0
3	(Iran) Nassaji Mazandaran	6	2	0	4	7	10	−3	6		0–3	1–3	—	2–0
4	(India) Mumbai City	6	0	0	6	1	17	−16	0		0–2	1–2	0–2	—

Source: AFC
Rules for classification: Tiebreakers

=== Group E ===
Pos	Team	Pld	W	D	L	GF	GA	GD	Pts	Qualification	NSR	PRS	DUH	IST
1	(Saudi Arabia) Al Nassr	6	4	2	0	13	7	+6	14	Advance to round of 16	—	0–0	4–3	3–1
2	(Iran) Persepolis	6	2	2	2	5	5	0	8		0–2	—	1–2	2–0
3	(Qatar) Al-Duhail	6	2	1	3	9	9	0	7		2–3	0–1	—	2–0
4	(Tajikistan) Istiklol	6	0	3	3	3	9	−6	3		1–1	1–1	0–0	—

Source: AFC
Rules for classification: Tiebreakers

=== Group F ===
Pos	Team	Pld	W	D	L	GF	GA	GD	Pts	Qualification	UTD	JBH	LCS	KIT
1	(Thailand) Bangkok United	6	4	1	1	11	8	+3	13	Advance to round of 16	—	3–2	1–0	1–1
2	(South Korea) Jeonbuk Hyundai Motors	6	4	0	2	12	9	+3	12	Advance to round of 16	3–2	—	3–0	2–1
3	(Singapore) Lion City Sailors	6	2	0	4	5	9	−4	6		1–2	2–0	—	0–2
4	(Hong Kong) Kitchee	6	1	1	4	7	9	−2	4		1–2	1–2	1–2	—

Source: AFC
Rules for classification: Tiebreakers

=== Group G ===
Pos	Team	Pld	W	D	L	GF	GA	GD	Pts	Qualification	FMA	SHT	ICN	KAY
1	(Japan) Yokohama F. Marinos	6	4	0	2	12	7	+5	12 (Note: Head-to-head goal difference: Yokohama F. Marinos +1, Shandong Taishan 0, Incheon United −1.)	Advance to round of 16	—	3–0	2–4	3–0
2	(China) Shandong Taishan	6	4	0	2	14	7	+7	12	Advance to round of 16	0–1	—	3–1	6–1
3	(South Korea) Incheon United	6	4	0	2	14	9	+5	12		2–1	0–2	—	4–0
4	(Philippines) Kaya–Iloilo	6	0	0	6	4	21	−17	0		1–2	1–3	1–3	—

Source: AFC
Rules for classification: Tiebreakers

=== Group H ===
Pos	Team	Pld	W	D	L	GF	GA	GD	Pts	Qualification	VEN	MCY	ZHP	BUR
1	(Japan) Ventforet Kofu	6	3	2	1	11	8	+3	11	Advance to round of 16	—	3–3	4–1	1–0
2	(Australia) Melbourne City	6	2	3	1	8	6	+2	9		0–0	—	1–1	0–1
3	(China) Zhejiang	6	2	1	3	9	13	−4	7		2–0	1–2	—	3–2
4	(Thailand) Buriram United	6	2	0	4	9	10	−1	6		2–3	0–2	4–1	—

Source: AFC
Rules for classification: Tiebreakers

=== Group I ===
Pos	Team	Pld	W	D	L	GF	GA	GD	Pts	Qualification	KWF	UHD	JDT	BGP
1	(Japan) Kawasaki Frontale	6	5	1	0	17	6	+11	16	Advance to round of 16	—	1–0	5–0	4–2
2	(South Korea) Ulsan Hyundai	6	3	1	2	12	8	+4	10	Advance to round of 16	2–2	—	3–1	3–1
3	(Malaysia) Johor Darul Ta'zim	6	3	0	3	11	13	−2	9		0–1	2–1	—	4–1
4	(Thailand) BG Pathum United	6	0	0	6	9	22	−13	0		2–4	1–3	2–4	—

Source: AFC
Rules for classification: Tiebreakers

=== Group J ===
Pos	Team	Pld	W	D	L	GF	GA	GD	Pts	Qualification	POH	RED	HAN	WTT
1	(South Korea) Pohang Steelers	6	5	1	0	14	5	+9	16	Advance to round of 16	—	2–1	2–0	3–1
2	(Japan) Urawa Red Diamonds	6	2	1	3	12	9	+3	7		0–2	—	6–0	2–1
3	(Vietnam) Hanoi FC	6	2	0	4	7	16	−9	6		2–4	2–1	—	2–1
4	(China) Wuhan Three Towns	6	1	2	3	8	11	−3	5		1–1	2–2	2–1	—

Source: AFC
Rules for classification: Tiebreakers

=== Ranking of second-placed teams ===
==== West Region ====
Pos	Grp	Team	Pld	W	D	L	GF	GA	GD	Pts	Qualification
1	D	(Uzbekistan) Navbahor	6	4	1	1	11	6	+5	13	Advance to round of 16
2	C	(Iran) Sepahan	6	3	1	2	16	8	+8	10	Advance to round of 16
3	A	(Saudi Arabia) Al-Fayha	6	3	0	3	12	10	+2	9	Advance to round of 16
4	B	(Qatar) Al Sadd	6	2	2	2	11	7	+4	8	
5	E	(Iran) Persepolis	6	2	2	2	5	5	0	8	

Source: AFC

==== East Region ====
Pos	Grp	Team	Pld	W	D	L	GF	GA	GD	Pts	Qualification
1	G	(China) Shandong Taishan	6	4	0	2	14	7	+7	12	Advance to round of 16
2	F	(South Korea) Jeonbuk Hyundai Motors	6	4	0	2	12	9	+3	12	Advance to round of 16
3	I	(South Korea) Ulsan Hyundai	6	3	1	2	12	8	+4	10	Advance to round of 16
4	H	(Australia) Melbourne City	6	2	3	1	8	6	+2	9	
5	J	(Japan) Urawa Red Diamonds	6	2	1	3	12	9	+3	7	

Source: AFC

== Knockout stage ==
=== Bracket ===
Round of 16
(Korea Football Association) Jeonbuk Hyundai Motors	2	1	3
(Korea Football Association) Pohang Steelers	0	1	1
(Korea Football Association) Ulsan Hyundai	3	2	5
(Japan Football Association) Ventforet Kofu	0	1	1
(Chinese Football Association) Shandong Taishan	2	4	6
(Japan Football Association) Kawasaki Frontale	3	2	5
(Football Association of Thailand) Bangkok United	2	0	2
(Japan Football Association) Yokohama F. Marinos (a.e.t.)	2	1	3
(Uzbekistan Football Association) Nasaf	0	1	1
(United Arab Emirates Football Association) Al Ain	0	2	2
(Saudi Arabian Football Federation) Al-Fayha	0	0	0
(Saudi Arabian Football Federation) Al Nassr	1	2	3
(Football Federation Islamic Republic of Iran) Sepahan	1	1	2
(Saudi Arabian Football Federation) Al Hilal	3	3	6
(Uzbekistan Football Association) Navbahor	0	1	1
(Saudi Arabian Football Federation) Al-Ittihad	0	2	2

Quarter-finals
(Korea Football Association) Jeonbuk Hyundai Motors	1	0	1
(Korea Football Association) Ulsan Hyundai	1	1	2
(Chinese Football Association) Shandong Taishan	1	0	1
(Japan Football Association) Yokohama F. Marinos	2	1	3
(United Arab Emirates Football Association) Al Ain (p)	1	3	4 (3)
(Saudi Arabian Football Federation) Al Nassr	0	4	4 (1)
(Saudi Arabian Football Federation) Al Hilal	2	2	4
(Saudi Arabian Football Federation) Al-Ittihad	0	0	0

Semi-finals
(Korea Football Association) Ulsan Hyundai	1	2	3 (4)
(Japan Football Association) Yokohama F. Marinos (p)	0	3	3 (5)
(United Arab Emirates Football Association) Al Ain	4	1	5
(Saudi Arabian Football Federation) Al Hilal	2	2	4

Final
(Japan Football Association) Yokohama F. Marinos	2	1	3
(United Arab Emirates Football Association) Al Ain	1	5	6

=== Round of 16 ===
The first legs were played on 13–15 February, and the second legs were played on 20–22 February 2024.

Team 1	Agg.	Team 2	1st leg	2nd leg
West Region
Nasaf (Uzbekistan)	1–2	(United Arab Emirates) Al Ain	0–0	1–2
Al-Fayha (Saudi Arabia)	0–3	(Saudi Arabia) Al Nassr	0–1	0–2
Sepahan (Iran)	2–6	(Saudi Arabia) Al Hilal	1–3	1–3
Navbahor (Uzbekistan)	1–2	(Saudi Arabia) Al-Ittihad	0–0	1–2
East Region
Jeonbuk Hyundai Motors (South Korea)	3–1	(South Korea) Pohang Steelers	2–0	1–1
Ulsan Hyundai (South Korea)	5–1	(Japan) Ventforet Kofu	3–0	2–1
Shandong Taishan (China)	6–5	(Japan) Kawasaki Frontale	2–3	4–2
Bangkok United (Thailand)	2–3	(Japan) Yokohama F. Marinos	2–2	0–1 (a.e.t.)

=== Quarter-finals ===
The first legs were played on 4–6 March 2024, and the second legs were played on 11–13 March 2024.

Team 1	Agg.	Team 2	1st leg	2nd leg
West Region
Al Ain (United Arab Emirates)	4–4 (3–1 p)	(Saudi Arabia) Al Nassr	1–0	3–4 (a.e.t.)
Al Hilal (Saudi Arabia)	4–0	(Saudi Arabia) Al-Ittihad	2–0	2–0
East Region
Jeonbuk Hyundai Motors (South Korea)	1–2	(South Korea) Ulsan Hyundai	1–1	0–1
Shandong Taishan (China)	1–3	(Japan) Yokohama F. Marinos	1–2	0–1

=== Semi-finals ===
The first legs were played on 17 April, and the second legs were played on 23 and 24 April 2024.

Team 1	Agg.	Team 2	1st leg	2nd leg
West Region
Al Ain (United Arab Emirates)	5–4	(Saudi Arabia) Al Hilal	4–2	1–2
East Region
Ulsan Hyundai (South Korea)	3–3 (4–5 p)	(Japan) Yokohama F. Marinos	1–0	2–3 (a.e.t.)

=== Final ===
The East Region team hosted the first leg as pre-determined on a rotation basis.

Team 1	Agg.	Team 2	1st leg	2nd leg
Yokohama F. Marinos (Japan)	3–6	(United Arab Emirates) Al Ain	2–1	1–5

11 May 2024
19:00 UTC+9

Yokohama F. Marinos (Japan Football Association)	2–1	(United Arab Emirates Football Association) Al Ain
Uenaka 72'; Watanabe 84'	Report	Abbas 12'

Nissan Stadium, Yokohama
Attendance: 53,704
Referee: Salman Falahi (Qatar)
25 May 2024
20:00 UTC+4

Al Ain (United Arab Emirates Football Association)	5–1	(Japan Football Association) Yokohama F. Marinos
Rahimi 8', 67'; Kaku 33' (pen.); Laba 90+1', 90+5'	Report	Yan Matheus 40'

Hazza bin Zayed Stadium, Al Ain
Attendance: 24,826
Referee: Ilgiz Tantashev (Uzbekistan)

== Top scorers ==
Team eliminated for this round.
Player is not in the team but the team is still active for this round.

Rank	Player	Team	MD1	MD2	MD3	MD4	MD5	MD6	R16-1	R16-2	QF1	QF2	SF1	SF2	F1	F2	Total
1	(Morocco) Soufiane Rahimi	(United Arab Emirates) Al Ain		1	1	1		1		1	1	2	3			2	13
2	(Brazil) Cryzan	(China) Shandong Taishan	1		1	1	3			2							8
2	(Serbia) Aleksandar Mitrović	(Saudi Arabia) Al Hilal		1	3	1			1	1	1						8
2	(Togo) Kodjo Fo-Doh Laba	(United Arab Emirates) Al Ain	2	1		2				1						2	8
5	(Saudi Arabia) Salem Al-Dawsari	(Saudi Arabia) Al Hilal					1	1		1	1		1	1			6
5	(Portugal) Cristiano Ronaldo	(Saudi Arabia) Al Nassr		1	2				1	1		1					6
5	(Brazil) Talisca	(Saudi Arabia) Al Nassr		2	1	3											6
5	(Brazil) Anderson Lopes	(Japan) Yokohama F. Marinos			1			1		1	1	1		1			6
9	(Hungary) Martin Ádám	(South Korea) Ulsan Hyundai	3					2									5
9	(Algeria) Baghdad Bounedjah	(Qatar) Al Sadd			3		1	1									5
9	(Uzbekistan) Khojimat Erkinov	(Uzbekistan) Pakhtakor			1	1	2	1									5
9	(Iran) Ramin Rezaeian	(Iran) Sepahan			2	1		1	1								5
9	(Brazil) Hernandes Rodrigues	(South Korea) Incheon United / (South Korea) Jeonbuk Hyundai Motors	2	1			1		1								5

Note

- Goals scored in the qualifying play-offs and matches voided by AFC are not counted when determining top scorer (Regulations Article 64.4)

== See also ==
- 2023–24 AFC Cup
- 2023 AFC Women's Club Championship
