= 2023–24 AFC Champions League knockout stage =

Asia premier club football tournament

The 2023–24 AFC Champions League knockout stage began on 13 February with the round of 16 and ended on 25 May 2024 with the final to decide the champions of the 2023–24 AFC Champions League. A total of 16 teams competed in the knockout stage.

== Qualified teams ==
The group winners and three best runners-up in the group stage from each region advanced to the round of 16, with both West Region (Groups A–E) and East Region (Groups F–J) having eight qualified teams.

Region	Group	Winners	Runners-up (best three from each region)
West Region	A	(United Arab Emirates Football Association) Al Ain	(Saudi Arabian Football Federation) Al-Fayha
West Region	B	(Uzbekistan Football Association) Nasaf	—N/a
West Region	C	(Saudi Arabian Football Federation) Al-Ittihad	(Football Federation Islamic Republic of Iran) Sepahan
West Region	D	(Saudi Arabian Football Federation) Al Hilal	(Uzbekistan Football Association) Navbahor
West Region	E	(Saudi Arabian Football Federation) Al Nassr	—N/a
East Region	F	(Football Association of Thailand) Bangkok United	(Korea Football Association) Jeonbuk Hyundai Motors
East Region	G	(Japan Football Association) Yokohama F. Marinos	(Chinese Football Association) Shandong Taishan
East Region	H	(Japan Football Association) Ventforet Kofu	—N/a
East Region	I	(Japan Football Association) Kawasaki Frontale	(Korea Football Association) Ulsan Hyundai
East Region	J	(Korea Football Association) Pohang Steelers	—N/a

== Format ==
In the knockout stage, the 16 teams played a single-elimination tournament, with the teams split into the two regions until the final. Each tie was played on a home-and-away two-legged basis. Extra time and a penalty shoot-out were used to decide the winner if necessary (note that the away goals rule had been abolished per the Regulations Article 10.1). The order of matches (home vs away) was determined at the draw, except for the final. The final was pre-determined on a rotation basis, with the first leg hosted by the team from the East Region. The match-ups were determined at a single draw event, made on 28 December 2023.

== Schedule ==
The schedule of the competition was as follows.

Stage	Round	Draw date	First leg	Second leg
Knockout stage	Round of 16	28 December 2023	13–15 February 2024	20–22 February 2024
Knockout stage	Quarter-finals	28 December 2023	4–6 March 2024	11–13 March 2024
Knockout stage	Semi-finals	28 December 2023	17 April 2024	23–24 April 2024
Knockout stage	Final	28 December 2023	11 May 2024	25 May 2024

== Bracket ==
The bracket was decided after the draw for the knockout stage, which was held on 28 December 2023, 16:00 MYT (UTC+8), at the AFC House in Kuala Lumpur, Malaysia.

Round of 16
(Korea Football Association) Jeonbuk Hyundai Motors	2	1	3
(Korea Football Association) Pohang Steelers	0	1	1
(Korea Football Association) Ulsan Hyundai	3	2	5
(Japan Football Association) Ventforet Kofu	0	1	1
(Chinese Football Association) Shandong Taishan	2	4	6
(Japan Football Association) Kawasaki Frontale	3	2	5
(Football Association of Thailand) Bangkok United	2	0	2
(Japan Football Association) Yokohama F. Marinos (a.e.t.)	2	1	3
(Uzbekistan Football Association) Nasaf	0	1	1
(United Arab Emirates Football Association) Al Ain	0	2	2
(Saudi Arabian Football Federation) Al-Fayha	0	0	0
(Saudi Arabian Football Federation) Al Nassr	1	2	3
(Football Federation Islamic Republic of Iran) Sepahan	1	1	2
(Saudi Arabian Football Federation) Al Hilal	3	3	6
(Uzbekistan Football Association) Navbahor	0	1	1
(Saudi Arabian Football Federation) Al-Ittihad	0	2	2

Quarter-finals
(Korea Football Association) Jeonbuk Hyundai Motors	1	0	1
(Korea Football Association) Ulsan Hyundai	1	1	2
(Chinese Football Association) Shandong Taishan	1	0	1
(Japan Football Association) Yokohama F. Marinos	2	1	3
(United Arab Emirates Football Association) Al Ain (p)	1	3	4 (3)
(Saudi Arabian Football Federation) Al Nassr	0	4	4 (1)
(Saudi Arabian Football Federation) Al Hilal	2	2	4
(Saudi Arabian Football Federation) Al-Ittihad	0	0	0

Semi-finals
(Korea Football Association) Ulsan Hyundai	1	2	3 (4)
(Japan Football Association) Yokohama F. Marinos (p)	0	3	3 (5)
(United Arab Emirates Football Association) Al Ain	4	1	5
(Saudi Arabian Football Federation) Al Hilal	2	2	4

Final
(Japan Football Association) Yokohama F. Marinos	2	1	3
(United Arab Emirates Football Association) Al Ain	1	5	6

== Round of 16 ==
=== Summary ===
The first legs were played on 13–15 February, and the second legs were played on 20–22 February 2024.

Team 1	Agg.	Team 2	1st leg	2nd leg
West Region
Nasaf (Uzbekistan)	1–2	(United Arab Emirates) Al Ain	0–0	1–2
Al-Fayha (Saudi Arabia)	0–3	(Saudi Arabia) Al Nassr	0–1	0–2
Sepahan (Iran)	2–6	(Saudi Arabia) Al Hilal	1–3	1–3
Navbahor (Uzbekistan)	1–2	(Saudi Arabia) Al-Ittihad	0–0	1–2
East Region
Jeonbuk Hyundai Motors (South Korea)	3–1	(South Korea) Pohang Steelers	2–0	1–1
Ulsan Hyundai (South Korea)	5–1	(Japan) Ventforet Kofu	3–0	2–1
Shandong Taishan (China)	6–5	(Japan) Kawasaki Frontale	2–3	4–2
Bangkok United (Thailand)	2–3	(Japan) Yokohama F. Marinos	2–2	0–1 (a.e.t.)

==== West Region ====
14 February 2024
19:00 UTC+5

Nasaf (Uzbekistan Football Association)	0–0	(United Arab Emirates Football Association) Al Ain
	Report

Markaziy Stadium, Qarshi
Attendance: 15,186
Referee: Adham Makhadmeh (Jordan)
21 February 2024
20:00 UTC+4

Al Ain (United Arab Emirates Football Association)	2–1	(Uzbekistan Football Association) Nasaf
Laba 55'; Rahimi 90+2'	Report	Mozgovoy 51'

Hazza bin Zayed Stadium, Al Ain
Attendance: 10,036
Referee: Alireza Faghani (Australia)

Al Ain won 2–1 on aggregate.

14 February 2024
21:00 UTC+3

Al-Fayha (Saudi Arabian Football Federation)	0–1	(Saudi Arabian Football Federation) Al Nassr
	Report	Ronaldo 81'

Prince Faisal bin Fahd Stadium, Riyadh (Note: To comply with AFC requirements, Al-Fayha used Prince Faisal bin Fahd Stadium instead of their home ground.)
Attendance: 3,111
Referee: Salman Falahi (Qatar)
21 February 2024
21:00 UTC+3

Al Nassr (Saudi Arabian Football Federation)	2–0	(Saudi Arabian Football Federation) Al-Fayha
Otávio 17'; Ronaldo 86'	Report

Al-Awwal Park, Riyadh
Attendance: 22,783
Referee: Ma Ning (China)

Al Nassr won 3–0 on aggregate.

15 February 2024
19:30 UTC+3:30

Sepahan (Football Federation Islamic Republic of Iran)	1–3	(Saudi Arabian Football Federation) Al Hilal
Rezaeian 37'	Report	Malcom 57'; Mitrović 90+4'; Al-Hamdan 90+7'

Naghsh-e Jahan Stadium, Isfahan
Attendance: 61,265
Referee: Ahmad Al-Ali (Kuwait)
22 February 2024
21:00 UTC+3

Al Hilal (Saudi Arabian Football Federation)	3–1	(Football Federation Islamic Republic of Iran) Sepahan
S. Al-Dawsari 76'; Neves 82'; Mitrović 90+7'	Report	Ahmadzadeh 54'

Kingdom Arena, Riyadh
Attendance: 18,055
Referee: Adel Al-Naqbi (United Arab Emirates)

Al Hilal won 6–2 on aggregate.

15 February 2024
19:00 UTC+5

Navbahor (Uzbekistan Football Association)	0–0	(Saudi Arabian Football Federation) Al-Ittihad
	Report

Markaziy Stadium, Namangan
Attendance: 26,200
Referee: Yusuke Araki (Japan)
22 February 2024
19:00 UTC+3

Al-Ittihad (Saudi Arabian Football Federation)	2–1	(Uzbekistan Football Association) Navbahor
Hamdallah 45+6'; Tabatadze 87' (o.g.)	Report	Benzema 25' (o.g.)

King Abdullah Sports City, Jeddah
Attendance: 34,832
Referee: Ko Hyung-jin (South Korea)

Al-Ittihad won 2–1 on aggregate.

==== East Region ====
14 February 2024
19:00 UTC+9

Jeonbuk Hyundai Motors (Korea Football Association)	2–0	(Korea Football Association) Pohang Steelers
Hernandes 17'; Ahn Hyeon-beom 64'	Report

Jeonju World Cup Stadium, Jeonju
Attendance: 10,966
Referee: Shaun Evans (Australia)
20 February 2024
19:00 UTC+9

Pohang Steelers (Korea Football Association)	1–1	(Korea Football Association) Jeonbuk Hyundai Motors
Park Chan-yong 12'	Report	Jeong Tae-wook 76'

Pohang Steel Yard, Pohang
Attendance: 5,680
Referee: Khalid Al-Turais (Saudi Arabia)

Jeonbuk Hyundai Motors won 3–1 on aggregate.

15 February 2024
19:00 UTC+9

Ulsan Hyundai (Korea Football Association)	3–0	(Japan Football Association) Ventforet Kofu
Joo Min-kyu 37', 45' (pen.); Seol Young-woo 61'	Report

Ulsan Munsu Football Stadium, Ulsan
Attendance: 7,621
Referee: Omar Al-Ali (United Arab Emirates)
21 February 2024
18:00 UTC+9

Ventforet Kofu (Japan Football Association)	1–2	(Korea Football Association) Ulsan Hyundai
Mitsuhira 88'	Report	Kim Ji-hyeon 11'; Joo Min-kyu 90+4'

Japan National Stadium, Tokyo (Note: To comply with AFC requirements, Ventforet Kofu used Japan National Stadium instead of their home ground.)
Attendance: 15,932
Referee: Mooud Bonyadifard (Iran)

Ulsan Hyundai won 5–1 on aggregate.

13 February 2024
18:00 UTC+8

Shandong Taishan (Chinese Football Association)	2–3	(Japan Football Association) Kawasaki Frontale
Fernandinho 67'; Jadson 85'	Report	Erison 28' (pen.); Marcinho 33'; Ienaga 79'

Jinan Olympic Sports Center Stadium, Jinan
Attendance: 46,273
Referee: Muhammad Taqi (Singapore)
20 February 2024
17:00 UTC+9

Kawasaki Frontale (Japan Football Association)	2–4	(Chinese Football Association) Shandong Taishan
Miura 30'; Erison 59'	Report	Cryzan 8', 73'; Gao Zhunyi 25'; Jadson 90+7'

Uvance Todoroki Stadium by Fujitsu, Kawasaki
Attendance: 11,732
Referee: Ahmad Al-Ali (Kuwait)

Shandong Taishan won 6–5 on aggregate.

14 February 2024
19:00 UTC+7

Bangkok United (Football Association of Thailand)	2–2	(Japan Football Association) Yokohama F. Marinos
Nitipong 35'; Mahmoud Eid 90+2'	Report	Élber 18'; Watanabe 24'

Thammasat Stadium, Pathum Thani
Attendance: 8,387
Referee: Mohammed Al-Hoaish (Saudi Arabia)
21 February 2024
20:00 UTC+9

Yokohama F. Marinos (Japan Football Association)	1–0 (a.e.t.)	(Football Association of Thailand) Bangkok United
Anderson Lopes 120+2' (pen.)	Report

Nissan Stadium, Yokohama
Attendance: 8,343
Referee: Ilgiz Tantashev (Uzbekistan)

Yokohama F. Marinos won 3–2 on aggregate.

== Quarter-finals ==
=== Summary ===
The first legs were played on 4–6 March 2024, and the second legs were played on 11–13 March 2024.

Team 1	Agg.	Team 2	1st leg	2nd leg
West Region
Al Ain (United Arab Emirates)	4–4 (3–1 p)	(Saudi Arabia) Al Nassr	1–0	3–4 (a.e.t.)
Al Hilal (Saudi Arabia)	4–0	(Saudi Arabia) Al-Ittihad	2–0	2–0
East Region
Jeonbuk Hyundai Motors (South Korea)	1–2	(South Korea) Ulsan Hyundai	1–1	0–1
Shandong Taishan (China)	1–3	(Japan) Yokohama F. Marinos	1–2	0–1

==== West Region ====
4 March 2024
20:00 UTC+4

Al Ain (United Arab Emirates Football Association)	1–0	(Saudi Arabian Football Federation) Al Nassr
Rahimi 44'	Report

Hazza bin Zayed Stadium, Al Ain
Attendance: 22,326
Referee: Hiroyuki Kimura (Japan)
11 March 2024
22:00 UTC+3

Al Nassr (Saudi Arabian Football Federation)	4–3 (a.e.t.)	(United Arab Emirates Football Association) Al Ain
Ghareeb 45+5'; Eisa 51' (o.g.); Telles 72'; Ronaldo 118' (pen.)	Report	Rahimi 28', 45'; Al-Shamsi 103'
Penalties
Brozović (penalty missed); Telles (penalty missed); Ronaldo (penalty scored); Otávio (penalty missed)	1–3	(penalty scored) Rahimi; (penalty scored) Kaku; (penalty scored) Al-Shamsi

Al-Awwal Park, Riyadh
Attendance: 23,878
Referee: Ahmed Al-Kaf (Oman)

4–4 on aggregate; Al Ain won 3–1 on penalties.

5 March 2024
21:00 UTC+3

Al Hilal (Saudi Arabian Football Federation)	2–0	(Saudi Arabian Football Federation) Al-Ittihad
Mitrović 40' (pen.); S. Al-Dawsari 42'	Report

Kingdom Arena, Riyadh
Attendance: 18,387
Referee: Shaun Evans (Australia)
12 March 2024
22:00 UTC+3

Al-Ittihad (Saudi Arabian Football Federation)	0–2	(Saudi Arabian Football Federation) Al Hilal
	Report	Al-Shahrani 61'; Malcom 90+5'

King Abdullah Sports City, Jeddah
Attendance: 42,375
Referee: Ma Ning (China)

Al Hilal won 4–0 on aggregate.

==== East Region ====
5 March 2024
19:00 UTC+9

Jeonbuk Hyundai Motors (Korea Football Association)	1–1	(Korea Football Association) Ulsan Hyundai
Song Min-kyu 4'	Report	Lee Myung-jae 77'

Jeonju World Cup Stadium, Jeonju
Attendance: 9,338
Referee: Adel Al-Naqbi (United Arab Emirates)
12 March 2024
19:00 UTC+9

Ulsan Hyundai (Korea Football Association)	1–0	(Korea Football Association) Jeonbuk Hyundai Motors
Seol Young-woo 45+2'	Report

Ulsan Munsu Football Stadium, Ulsan
Attendance: 10,934
Referee: Alireza Faghani (Australia)

Ulsan Hyundai won 2–1 on aggregate.

6 March 2024
18:00 UTC+8

Shandong Taishan (Chinese Football Association)	1–2	(Japan Football Association) Yokohama F. Marinos
Chen Pu 90+1'	Report	Anderson Lopes 7'; Yan Matheus 69'

Jinan Olympic Sports Center Stadium, Jinan
Attendance: 47,667
Referee: Adham Makhadmeh (Jordan)
13 March 2024
19:00 UTC+9

Yokohama F. Marinos (Japan Football Association)	1–0	(Chinese Football Association) Shandong Taishan
Anderson Lopes 75'	Report

Nissan Stadium, Yokohama
Attendance: 12,887
Referee: Nazmi Nasaruddin (Malaysia)

Yokohama F. Marinos won 3–1 on aggregate.

== Semi-finals ==
=== Summary ===
The first legs were played on 17 April, and the second legs were played on 23 and 24 April 2024.

Team 1	Agg.	Team 2	1st leg	2nd leg
West Region
Al Ain (United Arab Emirates)	5–4	(Saudi Arabia) Al Hilal	4–2	1–2
East Region
Ulsan Hyundai (South Korea)	3–3 (4–5 p)	(Japan) Yokohama F. Marinos	1–0	2–3 (a.e.t.)

==== West Region ====
17 April 2024 (Note: The match was postponed from 16 April due to adverse weather conditions.)
20:00 UTC+4

Al Ain (United Arab Emirates Football Association)	4–2	(Saudi Arabian Football Federation) Al Hilal
Rahimi 6', 26' (pen.), 38' (pen.); Kaku 56' (pen.)	Report	Malcom 49'; S. Al-Dawsari 78'

Hazza bin Zayed Stadium, Al Ain
Attendance: 21,226
Referee: Adham Makhadmeh (Jordan)
23 April 2024
21:00 UTC+3

Al Hilal (Saudi Arabian Football Federation)	2–1	(United Arab Emirates Football Association) Al Ain
Neves 4' (pen.); S. Al-Dawsari 51'	Report	Erik 12'

Kingdom Arena, Riyadh
Attendance: 18,445
Referee: Ahmed Al-Ali (United Arab Emirates)

Al Ain won 5–4 on aggregate.

==== East Region ====
17 April 2024
19:00 UTC+9

Ulsan Hyundai (Korea Football Association)	1–0	(Japan Football Association) Yokohama F. Marinos
Lee Dong-gyeong 19'	Report

Ulsan Munsu Football Stadium, Ulsan
Attendance: 9,558
Referee: Ahmed Al-Kaf (Oman)
24 April 2024
19:00 UTC+9

Yokohama F. Marinos (Japan Football Association)	3–2 (a.e.t.)	(Korea Football Association) Ulsan Hyundai
Uenaka 13', 30'; Anderson Lopes 21'	Report	Matheus Sales 35'; Bojanić 42' (pen.)
Penalties
Anderson Lopes (penalty scored); Mizunuma (penalty scored); Matsubara (penalty scored); Amano (penalty scored); Eduardo (penalty scored)	5–4	(penalty scored) Ádám; (penalty scored) Kelvin; (penalty scored) Ko Seung-beom; (penalty scored) Lee Chung-yong; (penalty missed) Kim Min-woo

Nissan Stadium, Yokohama
Attendance: 16,098
Referee: Alireza Faghani (Australia)

3–3 on aggregate; Yokohama F. Marinos won 5–4 on penalties.

== Final ==
The East Region team hosted the first leg as pre-determined on a rotation basis.

Team 1	Agg.	Team 2	1st leg	2nd leg
Yokohama F. Marinos (Japan)	3–6	(United Arab Emirates) Al Ain	2–1	1–5

11 May 2024
19:00 UTC+9

Yokohama F. Marinos (Japan Football Association)	2–1	(United Arab Emirates Football Association) Al Ain
Uenaka 72'; Watanabe 84'	Report	Abbas 12'

Nissan Stadium, Yokohama
Attendance: 53,704
Referee: Salman Falahi (Qatar)
25 May 2024
20:00 UTC+4

Al Ain (United Arab Emirates Football Association)	5–1	(Japan Football Association) Yokohama F. Marinos
Rahimi 8', 67'; Kaku 33' (pen.); Laba 90+1', 90+5'	Report	Yan Matheus 40'

Hazza bin Zayed Stadium, Al Ain
Attendance: 24,826
Referee: Ilgiz Tantashev (Uzbekistan)

Al Ain won 6–3 on aggregate.
