= Cloud seeding in the United Arab Emirates =

Artificial rain-making

Cloud seeding in the United Arab Emirates is a weather modification technique used by the government to address water challenges in the country. Cloud seeding is also referred to as man made precipitation and artificial rain making. The United Arab Emirates is one of the first countries in the Persian Gulf region to use cloud seeding technology. UAE scientists use cloud seeding technology to address the country's water insecurity, which stems from the extremely hot climate. They use weather radars to continuously monitor the atmosphere of the country. Forecasters and scientists have estimated that cloud seeding operations can enhance rainfall by as much as 30-35% percent in a clear atmosphere, and up to 10-15% in a more humid atmosphere. This practice has caused concerns regarding the impact on the environment because it is difficult to predict its long-term global implications.

Rain through cloud seeding in Dubai

== Climate needs ==
The UAE has an arid climate with less than 100mm per year of rainfall, a high evaporation rate of surface water and a low groundwater recharge rate. Rainfall in the UAE has been fluctuating over the last few decades in winter season between December and March.

The climate of the UAE is very dry aside from the coast and the border of the UAE and Oman, where there is high humidity. The UAE is located in a dust hotspot that contributes to the arid climate. There is little to no rainfall, due to frontal systems from the west and northwest, which yield few inches of rainfall per year. This lack of rainfall has scientists and the government worried about water security in the future.

Due to industrialization and population growth, the demand for water has rapidly increased. Current resources are being depleted and scarcity issues are arising as climate change increases evaporation rates, causing drought. As a result, the UAE is looking to cloud seeding technologies to increase water security as well as renewability to combat water and food scarcity that may arise. Research has predicted that drought frequencies and temperatures will continue increasing and cloud seeding hopes to provide an additional method of mitigation against future climate change.

== History ==
Scientists have been experimenting with cloud seeding technology since the 1940s. The cloud-seeding program in the UAE was initiated in the late 1990s, as one of the first Middle Eastern countries to utilize this technique. In 2005, the UAE launched the UAE Prize for Excellence in Advancing the Science and Practice of Weather Modification in collaboration with the World Meteorological Organization (WMO). In 2010, cloud seeding began as a project by weather authorities to create artificial rain. The project, which began in July 2010 and cost $11 million USD, succeeded in creating rain storms in the Dubai and Abu Dhabi deserts.

=== Government involvement ===
The UAE government developed a research program called the UAE Research Program for Rain Enhancement Science (UAEREP) in 2015. It allows scientists and researchers to pitch their potential solutions and conduct research to improve the accuracy of cloud seeding technology. After pitching research proposals, scientists are awarded grants through the UAEREP. Among its key goals are advancing the science, technology, and implementation of rain enhancement and encouraging additional investments in research funding and research partnerships to advance the field, increasing rainfall and ensuring water security globally. By early 2001, the UAEREP was conducting research projects in cooperation with the National Center for Atmospheric Research (NCAR) in the U.S., the Witwatersrand University in South Africa, the National Aeronautics and Space Agency (NASA) in the U.S.

The Program for Rain Enhancement Science is an initiative of the United Arab Emirates Ministry of Presidential Affairs. It is overseen by the UAE National Center of Meteorology & Seismology (NCMS) based in Abu Dhabi.

In 2014, a total of 187 missions were sent to seed clouds in the UAE with each aircraft taking about three hours to target five to six clouds at a cost of $3,000 per operation. In 2017, the UAE had 214 missions, and in 2018, it had 184 missions, and 247 missions were launched in 2019. Tests of new technologies were done in 2020 with partners in the United States to test the use of nanomaterials for seeding.

== Technology ==
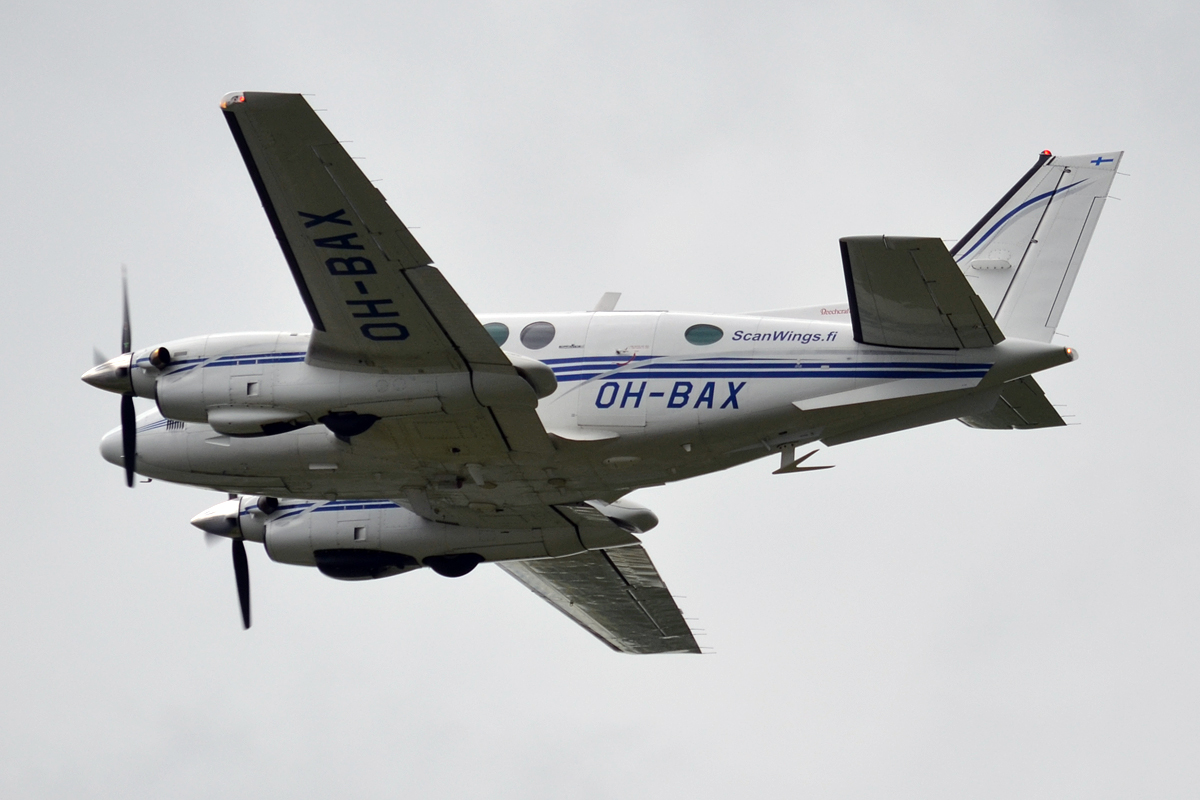
Beechcraft King Air C90 used for cloud seeding operations

The augmentation of rainfall considers both the ground-based and airborne processes that occur in different rain cloud types (but generally focused on convective clouds). The UAE utilizes operational aircraft-based and drone-controlled hygroscopic cloud seeding as opposed to conventional randomized aircraft seeding, as it does not take into consideration the varying properties of rain clouds, especially present in dusty and arid regions like the UAE. Since 2021, the devices have been equipped with a payload of electric-charge emission instruments and customized sensors that fly at low altitudes and deliver an electric charge to air molecules. Hygroscopic cloud seeding uses natural salts such as potassium chloride and sodium chloride that pre-exist in the atmosphere with hygroscopic flares. By introducing Hygroscopic particles, it enhances the natural rain particles which begins a collision-coalescence process.

At present, the UAE mostly cloud seeds in the eastern mountains on the border to Oman to raise levels in aquifers and reservoirs. There are 75 networked automatic weather stations distributed across the country, 7 air quality stations, a Doppler weather radar network of five stationary and one mobile radar, and six Beechcraft King Air C90 aircraft distributed across the country for cloud seeding operations.

== Environmental impact ==
=== Flooding ===
It is predicted that climate change will lead to higher temperatures, increased humidity and a greater risk of flooding in parts of the Gulf region. These issues could be worsened in nations like the UAE which do not have adequate drainage infrastructure to manage heavy rainfall.

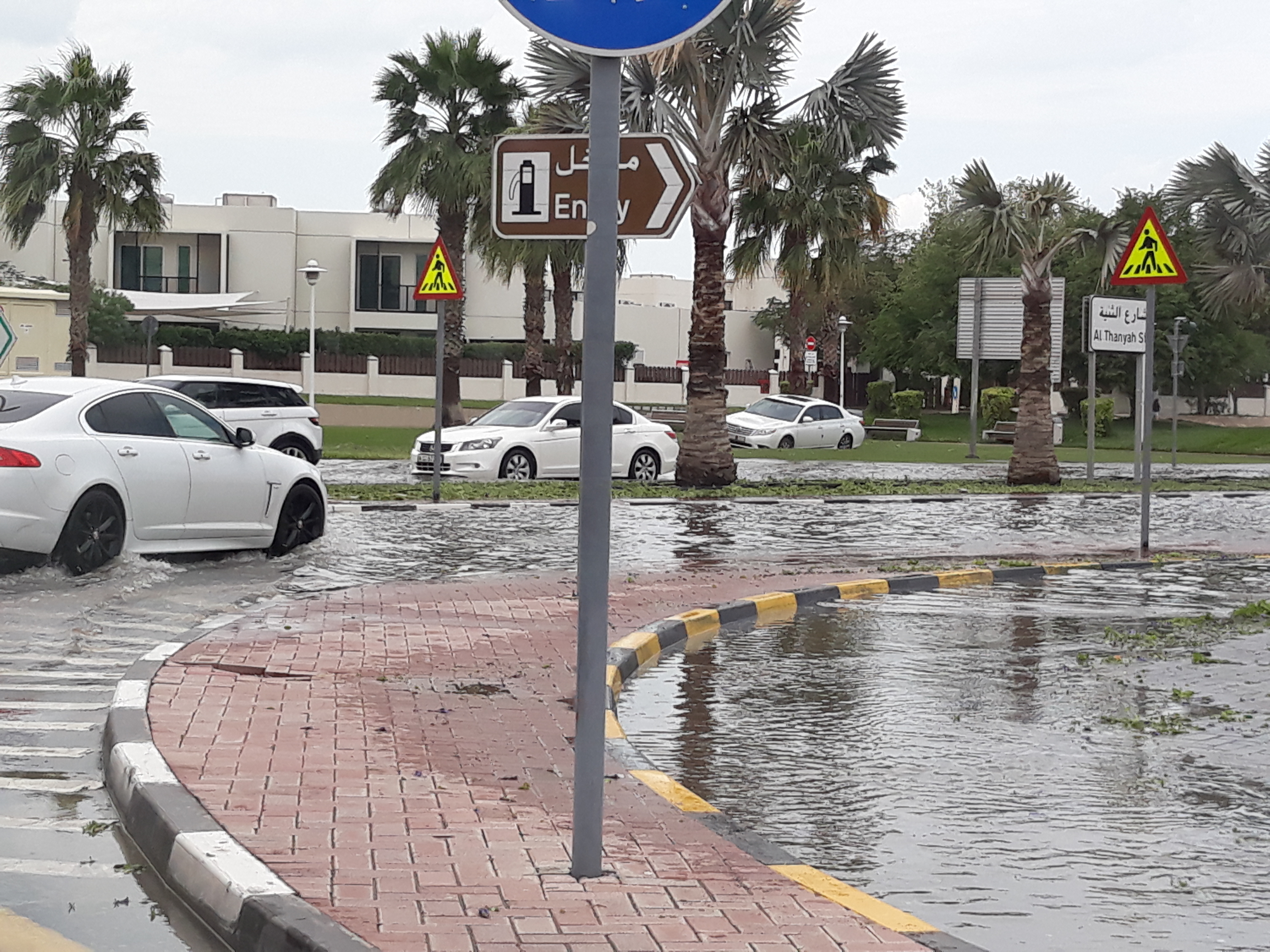
A flooded street in Dubai in 2020 during the cloud seeding rains

Cloud seeding activities conducted in 2019 by the UAE National Center of Meteorology & Seismology (NCM) as part of the UAE Research Program for Rain Enhancement Science were carried out prior to floods in Dubai in 2019. Although the NCM has linked heavier rainfall to cloud seeding operations, they assert it was not the cause of the flooding. Commercial and residential areas were severely impacted and pumps were needed to remove excess water due to inadequate drainage systems because drainage systems could not handle the volume of water. The UAE planned to invest 500 million dirhams ($136.1 million) on flood protection and transport infrastructure after severe storms in 2020.

Sharjah, one of the most populous cities in the UAE, has experienced repetitive urban flooding during the rainy season over the last three decades. Possible additional increased rainfall intensity due to cloud seeding would require additional investment in the city's drainage systems to mitigate flood risk.

==== April 2024 floods ====
Experts are doubtful that cloud seeding played a role in the UAE's April 2024 floods, suggesting that the heavy rainfall was more likely caused by anthropogenic climate change.

In the aftermath of the floods, some news outlets quoted specialist meteorologist Ahmed Habib linking the heavy downpours to the UAE's cloud seeding program. Due to the arid desert climate and high temperatures, cloud seeding has been used previously in the United Arab Emirates to combat water scarcity, which has been alleged to cause the severe thunderstorm system.

Dismissing the allegations, Omar Al Yazeedi, the deputy director-general of the UAE's National Centre of Meteorology (NCM), said the institution "did not conduct any seeding operations during this event". Other news commentators have also dismissed the link to cloud seeding, stating that the technology marginally increases rainfall and that the UAE's cloud seeding program is localised to the eastern part of the country, away from densely populated metropolitan areas; other experts, such as the Royal Meteorological Society, stated that cloud seeding would only have a minimal effect, with others even stating that the focus on cloud seeding is "misleading".

Scientists from the University of Reading, whose cloud seeding program is used by the UAE, denied that cloud seeding was to blame for the heavy rainfall, given that the large-scale weather pattern was predicted in advance and was too large to be influenced by cloud seeding. They added that the effects of cloud seeding are typically short-lived, lasting for a few hours and only impacted a particular region.

=== Atmospheric aerosols ===
Cloud seeding missions require firing salts and silver iodide crystals into the atmosphere. The increased concentration of particulate matter, or micro-pollutants, increases risk for respiratory illnesses. In 2017, a study was conducted before and after cloud seeding missions, which recorded an increase of particulate matter, correlating to the months of active artificial rain. Researchers attribute this to left over silver iodine crystals that were not dispersed in the rain during the cloud seeding months. A study was conducted called the UAE Unified Aerosol Experiment (UAE2) to assess the progress and effectiveness of cloud seeding specifically in the UAE. Researchers found a significant increase in rainfall trends in areas with cloud seeding. More recently, over 20 regions in the UAE that participated in cloud seeding experiments have a higher concentration of particulate matter. The overall environmental impact of cloud seeding is difficult measure due to the inability to perform controlled experiments along with the difficulty in direct tracing.

== See also ==
- Cloud seeding
- United Arab Emirates
- Environmental issues in the United Arab Emirates
- Arabian Desert
- Abu Dhabi
- Dubai Electricity and Water Authority
- Sharjah Electricity and Water Authority
- Particulates
