= 2023–24 AFC Champions League qualifying play-offs =

Asian Football Confederation play-offs

The 2023–24 AFC Champions League qualifying play-offs were played from 15 to 22 August 2023. A total of 21 teams competed in the qualifying play-offs to decide eight places in the group stage of the 2023–24 AFC Champions League.

== Teams ==
The following 21 teams, split into two regions (West Region and East Region), entered the qualifying play-offs, consisting of two rounds:

- 10 teams entered in the preliminary round.
- 11 teams entered in the play-off round.

| Region | Teams entering in play-off round | Teams entering in preliminary round |
|---|---|---|
| West Region | (Iran) Tractor; (Saudi Arabia) Al-Nassr; (Qatar) Al-Arabi; (Qatar) Al-Wakrah; (Uzbekistan) Navbahor | (Bangladesh) Bashundhara Kings; (Jordan) Al-Wehdat; (Oman) Al-Seeb; (United Arab Emirates) Shabab Al-Ahli; (United Arab Emirates) Sharjah; (Uzbekistan) AGMK |
| East Region | (China) Shanghai Port; (China) Zhejiang; (Japan) Urawa Red Diamonds; (South Korea) Incheon United; (Thailand) BG Pathum United; (Thailand) Port | (Hong Kong) Rangers; (Hong Kong) Lee Man; (Indonesia) Bali United; (Vietnam) Haiphong |

== Format ==
In the qualifying play-offs, each tie was played as a single match. Extra time and penalty shoot-out were used to decide the winner if necessary.

== Schedule ==
The schedule of each round was as follows.

| Round | Match date |
|---|---|
| Preliminary round | 15–16 August 2023 |
| Play-off round | 22 August 2023 |

== Bracket ==
The bracket of the qualifying play-offs for each region was determined based on each team's association ranking and their seeding within their association, with the team from the higher-ranked association hosting the match. Teams from the same association could not be placed into the same tie. The eight winners of the play-off round (four from West Region and four from East Region) advanced to the group stage to join the 32 direct entrants.

=== Play-off West 1 ===
Preliminary round
(United Arab Emirates) Shabab Al-Ahli | 3
(Jordan) Al-Wehdat | 0

Play-off round
(Saudi Arabia) Al-Nassr | 4
(United Arab Emirates) Shabab Al-Ahli | 2

=== Play-off West 2 ===
Preliminary round
(United Arab Emirates) Sharjah | 2
(Bangladesh) Bashundhara Kings | 0

Play-off round
(Iran) Tractor | 1
(United Arab Emirates) Sharjah | 3

=== Play-off West 3 ===
Preliminary round
(Uzbekistan) AGMK | 1
(Oman) Al-Seeb | 0

Play-off round
(Qatar) Al-Arabi | 0
(Uzbekistan) AGMK | 1

=== Play-off West 4 ===
| Play-off round |
| (Qatar) Al-Wakrah | 0 |
| (Uzbekistan) Navbahor | 1 |

=== Play-off East 1 ===
Preliminary round
(Hong Kong) Rangers | 1
(Vietnam) Haiphong (a.e.t.) | 4

Play-off round
(South Korea) Incheon United (a.e.t.) | 3
(Vietnam) Haiphong | 1

=== Play-off East 2 ===
Preliminary round
(Hong Kong) Lee Man | 5
(Indonesia) Bali United | 1

Play-off round
(Japan) Urawa Red Diamonds | 3
(Hong Kong) Lee Man | 0

=== Play-off East 3 ===
| Play-off round |
| (China) Zhejiang | 1 |
| (Thailand) Port | 0 |

=== Play-off East 4 ===
| Play-off round |
| (China) Shanghai Port | 2 |
| (Thailand) BG Pathum United | 3 |

== Preliminary round ==
=== Summary ===
A total of 10 teams played in the preliminary round.

| Team 1 | Score | Team 2 |
|---|---|---|
West Region
| Shabab Al-Ahli (United Arab Emirates) | 3–0 | (Jordan) Al-Wehdat |
| Sharjah (United Arab Emirates) | 2–0 | (Bangladesh) Bashundhara Kings |
| AGMK (Uzbekistan) | 1–0 | (Oman) Al-Seeb |
East Region
| Rangers (Hong Kong) | 1–4 (a.e.t.) | (Vietnam) Haiphong |
| Lee Man (Hong Kong) | 5–1 | (Indonesia) Bali United |

=== West Region ===
15 August 2023
19:35 UTC+4

| Shabab Al-Ahli (United Arab Emirates) | 3–0 | (Jordan) Al-Wehdat |
|---|---|---|
| Ganiev 57'; Renan 65'; Dabbur 86' | Report |

Rashid Stadium, Dubai
Attendance: 3,014
Referee: Nazmi Nasaruddin (Malaysia)

15 August 2023
19:35 UTC+4

| Sharjah (United Arab Emirates) | 2–0 | (Bangladesh) Bashundhara Kings |
|---|---|---|
| Luanzinho 45+3', 71' | Report |

Sharjah Stadium, Sharjah
Attendance: 1,426
Referee: Nasrullo Kabirov (Tajikistan)

15 August 2023
20:00 UTC+5

| AGMK (Uzbekistan) | 1–0 | (Oman) Al-Seeb |
|---|---|---|
| Giyosov 48' | Report |

OKMK Sport Majmuasi, Olmaliq
Attendance: 7,077
Referee: Hanna Hattab (Syria)

=== East Region ===
15 August 2023
19:30 UTC+8

| Rangers (Hong Kong) | 1–4 (a.e.t.) | (Vietnam) Haiphong |
|---|---|---|
| Kanda 41' | Report | Nguyễn Tuấn Anh 88'; Mamute 108', 116'; Lo 111' |

Mong Kok Stadium, Hong Kong
Attendance: 4,158
Referee: Omar Mohamed Al Ali (United Arab Emirates)

16 August 2023
20:00 UTC+8

| Lee Man (Hong Kong) | 5–1 | (Indonesia) Bali United |
|---|---|---|
| Paulissen 8', 56'; Gil 13'; Everton 45+2'; José Ángel 86' | Report | Tsui Wang Kit 11' (o.g.) |

Hong Kong Stadium, Hong Kong
Attendance: 4,238
Referee: Abdullah Jamali (Kuwait)

== Play-off round ==
=== Summary ===
A total of 16 teams played in the play-off round: 11 teams which entered in this round, and 5 winners of the preliminary round.

| Team 1 | Score | Team 2 |
|---|---|---|
West Region
| Al-Nassr (Saudi Arabia) | 4–2 | (United Arab Emirates) Shabab Al-Ahli |
| Tractor (Iran) | 1–3 | (United Arab Emirates) Sharjah |
| Al-Arabi (Qatar) | 0–1 | (Uzbekistan) AGMK |
| Al-Wakrah (Qatar) | 0–1 (a.e.t.) | (Uzbekistan) Navbahor |
East Region
| Incheon United (South Korea) | 3–1 (a.e.t.) | (Vietnam) Haiphong |
| Urawa Red Diamonds (Japan) | 3–0 | (Hong Kong) Lee Man |
| Zhejiang (China) | 1–0 | (Thailand) Port |
| Shanghai Port (China) | 2–3 | (Thailand) BG Pathum United |

=== West Region ===
22 August 2023
20:20 UTC+3

| Al-Nassr (Saudi Arabia) | 4–2 | (United Arab Emirates) Shabab Al-Ahli |
|---|---|---|
| Talisca 11', 90+5'; Al-Ghannam 88'; Brozović 90+7' | Report | Al-Ghassani 18', 46' |

Al-Awwal Park, Riyadh
Attendance: 20,600
Referee: Fu Ming (China)

22 August 2023
19:30 UTC+3:30

| Tractor (Iran) | 1–3 | (United Arab Emirates) Sharjah |
|---|---|---|
| Hashemnejad 86' | Report | Abdulrahman 25'; Camara 84'; Lucas 90' |

Sahand Stadium, Tabriz
Attendance: 69,594
Referee: Kim Jong-hyeok (South Korea)

22 August 2023
20:30 UTC+3

| Al-Arabi (Qatar) | 0–1 | (Uzbekistan) AGMK |
|---|---|---|
| | Report | Sánchez 69' |

Al Thumama Stadium, Doha
Attendance: 6,617
Referee: Ko Hyung-jin (South Korea)

22 August 2023
18:30 UTC+3

| Al-Wakrah (Qatar) | 0–1 (a.e.t.) | (Uzbekistan) Navbahor |
|---|---|---|
| | Report | Abdumannopov 98' |

Al Janoub Stadium, Al Wakrah
Attendance: 6,415
Referee: Hiroyuki Kimura (Japan)

=== East Region ===
22 August 2023
19:30 UTC+9

| Incheon United (South Korea) | 3–1 (a.e.t.) | (Vietnam) Haiphong |
|---|---|---|
| Cheon Seong-hoon 17'; Hernandes 100'; Gerso 120+3' | Report | Mamute 4' |

Incheon Football Stadium, Incheon
Attendance: 5,206
Referee: Mouood Bonyadifar (Iran)

22 August 2023
19:30 UTC+9

| Urawa Red Diamonds (Japan) | 3–0 | (Hong Kong) Lee Man |
|---|---|---|
| Koizumi 3'; Koroki 6'; Sekine 90+3' | Report |

Saitama Stadium 2002, Saitama
Attendance: 15,568
Referee: Sadullo Gulmurodi (Tajikistan)

22 August 2023
19:30 UTC+8

| Zhejiang (China) | 1–0 | (Thailand) Port |
|---|---|---|
| Andrijašević 51' | Report |

Huzhou Olympic Sports Centre, Huzhou
Attendance: 15,608
Referee: Akhrol Risqullaev (Uzbekistan)

22 August 2023
19:30 UTC+8

| Shanghai Port (China) | 2–3 | (Thailand) BG Pathum United |
|---|---|---|
| Muzepper 31'; Pink 85' | Report | Sergeev 11', 26', 60' |

Pudong Football Stadium, Shanghai
Attendance: 15,013
Referee: Ammar Mahfoodh (Bahrain)
