= The UAE Research Program for Rain Enhancement Science =

The United Arab Emirates Research Program for Rain Enhancement Science (UAEREP) is a global research initiative offering a grant of US$5 million over a three-year period to be shared by up to five winning research projects in the field of rain enhancement.

The cloud-seeding operations were initiated in the late 1990s in the UAE. By early 2001 these operations were being conducted in cooperation with the National Center for Atmospheric Research (NCAR) in Colorado, USA, the Witwatersrand University in South Africa and the US Space Agency, NASA.

== Management of the program ==
The United Arab Emirates Research Program for Rain Enhancement Science is an initiative of the United Arab Emirates Ministry of Presidential Affairs and was launched at the beginning of 2015 under the patronage of His Highness Sheikh Mansour bin Zayed Al Nahyan, Deputy Prime Minister and Minister of Presidential Affairs. It is managed by Alya Al Mazroui and overseen by the National Center for Meteorology (United Arab Emirates) (NCMS) based in Abu Dhabi.

== Goals of the program ==
- Advance the science, technology and implementation of rain enhancement and encourage additional investments in research funding and research partnerships to advance the field.
- Increase rainfall and water security globally.

Four pathways have been identified to achieve those goals:

- Enhance the level of research and innovation in the field;
- Advance scientific understanding of rainfall enhancement;
- Advance state-of-the-art rainfall enhancement practices and operations;
- Enhance and further develop capacity in the field both locally and globally.

== Selection process ==
The research grant is awarded on a yearly basis. The Program invites innovative research and technology proposals from domestic or foreign, public or private, non-profit or for-profit organizations and, in some cases, individuals.

All of the proposals selected are subject to five criteria:

- Overall Scientific and Technical Merit, Significance and Innovation (30%);
- Approach, Project/Delivery Plan, Milestones and Deliverables (20%);
- Investigator/Team (20%);
- Required/Available Resources and Budget (20%);
- Capacity Building (10%).

== Program cycles ==
The program had the following two cycles.

=== First cycle ===
The first cycle of the Program was announced on 20 January 2015. All awardees were selected by a merit review process and announced in January 2016. The awarded research projects were selected based on their ability to promote scientific understanding in the field of rain enhancement science and further develop related technologies, applications, and operations, as well as build capacity.

The three prize-awarded scientists leading the research teams that share this cycle's grant of US$5 million are:

- Masataka Murakami, Visiting Professor from the Institute for Space-Earth Environmental Research, Nagoya University (Japan). Researchers from the University of Tokyo and the Japan Meteorological Agency also contributed to his research project on innovative algorithms and sensors dedicated to identifying the clouds most suitable for seeding.
- Linda Zou, Professor of Chemical and Environmental Engineering from the Masdar Institute of Science and Technology (UAE). Prof. Zou has received contribution to her work on nanotechnology to accelerate water condensation from the National University of Singapore and the University of Belgrade. The research explores the different ways of employing current knowledge of nanotechnology to develop novel cloud seeding materials and make rain droplet formation more efficient.
- Volker Wulfmeyer, Professor, Managing Director and Chair of Physics and Meteorology at the Institute of Physics and Meteorology in the University of Hohenheim (Germany). His research project deals with cloud seeding optimization, and aims to specifically study convergence zones and land cover modification to enhance precipitation.

In 2015, in total, 325 scientists and researchers affiliated to 151 organizations applied to the Program. These researchers, drawn from 34 countries around the world, cooperated as scientific teams on the submission of a total of 78 pre-proposals.

=== Second cycle ===
Announced on January 19, 2016, the Program received 91 pre-proposals from 398 scientists, researchers, and technologists affiliated to 180 institutes from 45 nations. Candidates from 45 countries — including scientists and researchers from 15 new countries such as Austria, Azerbaijan, Belarus, Belgium, Canada, Colombia, Egypt, Georgia, Hungary, Mexico, Qatar, Saudi Arabia, Serbia, Sweden, and Turkey, sent proposals to the Program.

After a month-long initial review process, 15 pre-proposals have been shortlisted.

on 17 January 2017 The Second Cycle awardees were selected due to their innovative technologies, applications, and operations towards the scientific understanding in the field of rain enhancement science. The awarded scientists include

- Paul Lawson
- Hannele Korhonen
- Giles Harrison

=== Third cycle ===
The awardees of the Third Cycle of the Program were announced on 17 January 2018, during Abu Dhabi Sustainability Week (ADSW). The awarded research projects were led by researchers from Russia, USA and China. Selected from a highly competitive field, the awarded projects featured a range of innovative new scientific and technological approaches to rain enhancement.

The three prize-awarded scientists leading the research teams that share the Third Cycle's grant of US$5 million are:

- Ali Abshaev, Doctor and Associate Professor at the Hail Suppression Research Center (Russia). His project seeks to create a new method of rain enhancement by stimulating convection and precipitation by using the energy of solar radiation. Preliminary studies using 3D models have demonstrated that artificial updraft can be created by heating up layers of the surrounding atmosphere, ultimately reaching condensation height.
- Eric W. Frew, an associate professor in the Ann and H.J. Smead Aerospace Engineering Sciences Department and Director of the Research and Engineering Center for Unmanned Vehicles at the University of Colorado Boulder (USA). His project involves an innovative approach towards the enhancement of precipitation based on the use of in-situ real time data to sense, target and implement cloud seeding with auto drones.
- Lulin Xue, Chief Scientist of Hua Xin Chuang Zhi Science and Technology LLC (China). The core objectives of his proposed study are to improve knowledge of hygroscopic seeding impacts on the warm rain initiation and quantify the potential seeding impact and uncertainties on UAE rainfall in a 10-year period.

Reflecting the Program's outstanding success and growing international status as a hub for rain enhancement research, the Third Cycle call for research proposals led to 201 pre-proposal submissions being received, representing 710 scientists and researchers affiliated to 316 institutions spread across 68 countries on five continents.

== Cloud seeding in the UAE ==
Cloud seeding in the United Arab Emirates is a weather modification technique used by the government to address water challenges in the country. Cloud seeding is also referred to as man made precipitation and artificial rain making. The United Arab Emirates is one of the first countries in the Persian Gulf region to use cloud seeding technology. UAE scientists use cloud seeding technology to address the country's water insecurity, which stems from the extremely hot climate. They use weather radars to continuously monitor the atmosphere of the country. Forecasters and scientists have estimated that cloud seeding operations can enhance rainfall by as much as 30-35% percent in a clear atmosphere, and up to 10-15% in a more humid atmosphere. This practice has caused concerns regarding the impact on the environment because it is difficult to predict its long-term global implications.

Rain through cloud seeding in Dubai
