= Volker Wulfmeyer =

German physicist and meteorologist

Volker Wulfmeyer (born 8 October 1965) is a German physicist, meteorologist, climate and earth system researcher, university professor, and member of the Heidelberg Academy of Sciences.

== Biography ==
Wulfmeyer received his doctorate in 1995 from the University of Hamburg and Max-Planck-Institute for Meteorology under Hartmut Graßl and Jens Bösenberg in the Department of Geosciences with the thesis "DIAL Measurements of Vertical Water Vapor Distributions". Under a Feodor Lynen Fellowship from the Alexander von Humboldt Foundation, he worked as a postdoctoral researcher and leader of the joint NOAA-NCAR lidar research team in Boulder (Colorado), US, from 1996 to 1998, and as a scientist at NCAR from 1998 to 2000.

Since February 2001, Wulfmeyer is a university professor, the managing director of the Institute of Physics and Meteorology and holder of the Chair of Physics and Meteorology at the University of Hohenheim in Stuttgart.

== Research and projects ==
Based on his work at NOAA and NCAR, Wulfmeyer developed suitable sensor synergies to study turbulent transport processes in the convective boundary layer, mesoscale circulations in complex terrain, exchange processes at the land surface, entrainment processes at the top of the boundary layer, and generally to study land-atmosphere feedback.

In parallel, his team at the University of Hohenheim further optimized the WRF-NOAHMP land-atmosphere model, which has been used for a wide variety of model studies, including turbulence analyses, air pollution over Stuttgart, bio-geoengineering approaches, high-resolution weather forecasts, impact studies for data assimilation, and regional climate simulations. In this context, his institute contributed to the latest regional climate projections for Europe within the BMBF project ReKliEs-De and the EURO-CORDEX project of the World Climate Research Program.

In recent years, machine learning approaches have also found their way into this research portfolio, e.g., to study exchange processes at the land surface. Currently, his team is expanding the Land Atmosphere Feedback Observatory (LAFO), which is used to study the land-atmosphere system.

Since 2020 Wulfmeyer is a member of the WCRP panel Global Land/Atmosphere System Study (GLASS) of the Global Energy and Water Exchanges (GEWEX).

== Other interests and activities ==
Being a co-signer of the declaration "Scientists for Future" and co-founder of the regional group of this movement in Stuttgart, Wulfmeyer also deals with problems and issues raised by climate change. As part of this commitment, Wulfmeyer initiated the founding of the Climate Crisis Working Group at the Heidelberg Academy of Sciences and Humanities, which held a series of lectures on the subject and published a special issue.

== Selection of publications ==
- Wulfmeyer, V., J.M.V. Pineda, S. Otte, M. Karlbauer, M.V. Butz, T.R. Lee, and V. Rajtschan, 2023: Estimation of the surface fluxes for heat and momentum in unstable conditions with machine learning and similarity approaches for the LAFE data set. Boundary-Layer Meteorol. 186, 337–371, DOI:10.1007/s10546-022-00761-2.
- Wulfmeyer, V., and A. Behrendt, 2021: Raman Lidar for Water-Vapor and Temperature Profiling. In: Foken T (ed.), Chapter 25, Handbook of Atmospheric Measurements. Springer Nature, Switzerland, 719–739. DOI:10.1007/978-3-030-51171-4_25.
- Wulfmeyer, V., D.D. Turner, B. Baker, R. Banta, A. Behrendt, T. Bonin, W.A. Brewer, M. Buban, A. Choukulkar, E. Dumas, R.M. Hardesty, T. Heus, J. Ingwersen, D. Lange, T. R. Lee, S. Metzendorf, S.K. Muppa, T. Meyers, R. Newsom, M. Osman, S. Raasch, J. Santanello, C. Senff, F. Späth, T. Wagner, T. Weckwerth, 2018: A new research approach for observing and characterizing land-atmosphere feedback. Bull. Amer. Meteorol. Soc. 99, 1639–1667, DOI:10.1175/BAMS-D-17-0009.1.
- Wulfmeyer, V., S.K. Muppa, A. Behrendt, E. Hammann, F. Späth, Z. Sorbjan, D.D. Turner, and R.M. Hardesty, 2016: Determination of convective boundary layer entrainment fluxes, dissipation rates, and the molecular destruction of variances: Theoretical description and a strategy for its confirmation with a novel lidar system synergy. J. Atmos. Sci. 73, 667–692, DOI:10.1175/JAS-D-14-0392.1.
- Wulfmeyer, V., R.M. Hardesty, D.D. Turner, A. Behrendt, M.P. Cadeddu, P. Di Girolamo, P. Schlüssel, J. Van Baelen, and F. Zus, 2015: A review of the remote sensing of lower-tropospheric thermodynamic profiles and its indispensable role for the understanding and the simulation of water and energy cycles. Rev. Geophys. 53, 819–895, DOI:10.1002/2014RG000476.
