= 2022 United Arab Emirates floods =

Natural disaster in the United Arab Emirates

- Date: 27 July 2022
- Location: Kalba, Fujairah and the Emirate of Ras Al Khaimah
- Cause: Heavy rains
- Deaths: 7
- Property damage: c. 1 million AED

In 2022, heavy rains caused floods in the United Arab Emirates, lasting from 26 to 29 July 2022. Cities of the northern Emirates, mainly Kalba and Fujairah, and different areas of the Emirate of Ras Al Khaimah, were affected by the heavy rains. According to the Emirati National Center for Meteorology, this was the country's heaviest rainfall recorded in 27 years.

== Impact ==
Seven people of Asian descent were confirmed dead. At least 870 people were rescued while 3,897 individuals were placed in temporary shelters in Fujairah and Sharjah.

Traders in the Emirate of Fujairah lost nearly AED 1 million worth of goods.

== Response ==
Emirati Vice President Sheikh Mohammed bin Rashid issued a red alert in the state and directed immediate relief operations from police, rescue services, and military personnel from nearby emirates to assist in rescue operations. All hotels in Fujairah were instructed to shelter flood-affected families in their vacant rooms. The administration has also issued instructions to people to work from home for two days.

Sheikh Sultan bin Muhammad Al-Qasimi, ruler of Sharjah, ordered AED 50,000 ($13,600) to be given to every family forced to leave their home during flooding.
