= National Center for Meteorology (United Arab Emirates) =

Meteorological agency of the United Arab Emirates

National Center for Meteorology (NCM)
- المركز الوطني للأرصاد

Agency overview
- Formed: 1 January 2007; 19 years ago
- Preceding agency: Ministry of Climate Change and Environment (United Arab Emirates)
- Type: Ministry
- Jurisdiction: Federal government of the United Arab Emirates
- Headquarters: Abu dhabi United Arab Emirates; 24.338281°N 54.641059°E
- Agency executive: Abdulla Al Mandous, The Director-General
- Parent agency: Ministry of Climate Change and Environment (United Arab Emirates)
- Website: www.ncm.gov.ae

The National Center for Meteorology (NCM; Arabic: المركز الوطني للأرصاد) is the national meteorological research and forecasting organization of United Arab Emirates, working under the Ministry of Climate Change and Environment (United Arab Emirates) of the United Arab Emirates. The center was established in March 2007. The center is tasked with weather forecasting, issuing early warnings, and collaborating with other international meteorology institutions to employ the latest technologies. In addition to its meteorological services, the center is responsible for cloud seeding to increase the rate of precipitation in United Arab Emirates.

== History ==
The National Center of Meteorology was established in March 2007. The late His Highness Sheikh Khalifa bin Zayed Al Nahyan issued a federal decree Law No. (6) Of the year 2007 to establish the National Centre of Meteorology and Seismology. In addition to the meteorology center establishment, the session included the establishment of the National Center for Environmental Compliance, National Center for Plant Covering Development and Combating of Desertification.

== Responsibilities ==
- Weather Condition
- Weather Stations
- Earthquakes Monitoring
- Climate reports
- Tropical Storms
- Satellite Imagery
- Airports stations
- Warnings Map

== See also ==
- Cloud seeding in the United Arab Emirates
- Ministry of Climate Change and Environment (United Arab Emirates)
- United Arab Emirates
- Abdulla Al Mandous
