= Bangkok United F.C. in Asian competitions =

For Bangkok United Football Club , the head coach is Totchtawan Sripan.

== Results ==
Season	Competition	Round	Club	Home	Away	Aggregate
2007	AFC Champions League	Group F	(South Korea) Chunnam Dragons	0–0	2–3	4th out of 4
2007	AFC Champions League	Group F	(Japan) Kawasaki Frontale	1–2	1–1	4th out of 4
2007	AFC Champions League	Group F	(Indonesia) Arema Malang	0–0	0–1	4th out of 4
2017	AFC Champions League	Preliminary round 2	(Malaysia) Johor Darul Ta'zim	1–1 (a.e.t.) (4–5 p)	—N/a	—N/a
2019	AFC Champions League	Preliminary round 2	(Vietnam) Hà Nội	0–1	—N/a	—N/a
2023–24	AFC Champions League	Group F	(Singapore) Lion City Sailors	1–0	2–1	1st out of 4
2023–24	AFC Champions League	Group F	(South Korea) Jeonbuk Hyundai Motors	3–2	2–3	1st out of 4
2023–24	AFC Champions League	Group F	(Hong Kong) Kitchee	1–1	2–1	1st out of 4
2023–24	AFC Champions League	Round of 16	(Japan) Yokohama F. Marinos	2–2	0–1 (a.e.t.)	2–3
2024–25	AFC Champions League Elite	Play-off round	(China) Shandong Taishan	—N/a	1–1 (a.e.t.) (3–4 p)	—N/a
2024–25	AFC Champions League Two	Group G	(Singapore) Tampines Rovers	4–2	0–1	1st out of 4
2024–25	AFC Champions League Two	Group G	(Vietnam) Thép Xanh Nam Định	3–2	0–0	1st out of 4
2024–25	AFC Champions League Two	Group G	(Hong Kong) Lee Man	4–1	1–0	1st out of 4
2024–25	AFC Champions League Two	Round of 16	(Australia) Sydney FC	2–3 (a.e.t.)	2–2	4–5
2025–26	AFC Champions League Elite	Play-off round	(China) Chengdu Rongcheng	—N/a	0–3	—N/a
2025–26	AFC Champions League Two	Group G	(Malaysia) Selangor			
2025–26	AFC Champions League Two	Group G	(Indonesia) Persib Bandung			
2025–26	AFC Champions League Two	Group G	(Singapore) Lion City Sailors			
2025–26	ASEAN Club Championship	Group B	(Vietnam) Thép Xanh Nam Định		—N/a	
2025–26	ASEAN Club Championship	Group B	(Malaysia) Johor Darul Ta'zim	—N/a		
2025–26	ASEAN Club Championship	Group B	(Singapore) Lion City Sailors		—N/a	
2025–26	ASEAN Club Championship	Group B	(Cambodia) Preah Khan Reach Svay Rieng	—N/a		
2025–26	ASEAN Club Championship	Group B	(Myanmar) Shan United		—N/a	

== Statistics ==
=== By competition ===
Statistics of Bangkok United in Asian competition.

Competition	Pld	W	D	L	GF	GA	GD	Win%
AFC Champions League	16	4	6	6	18	20	−2	25.00
AFC Champions League Elite	1	0	1	0	1	1	+0	0.00
AFC Champions League Two	8	4	2	2	16	11	+5	50.00

=== By nation ===
Nation	Pld	W	D	L	GF	GA	GD	Win%
China	1	0	1	0	1	1	+0	0.00
Hong Kong	2	1	1	0	3	2	+1	50.00
Indonesia	2	0	1	1	0	1	−1	0.00
Japan	4	0	2	2	4	6	−2	0.00
Malaysia	1	0	1	0	1	1	+0	0.00
Singapore	2	2	0	0	3	1	+2	100.00
South Korea	4	1	1	2	7	8	−1	25.00
Vietnam	1	0	0	1	0	1	−1	0.00
