= 2024–25 AFC Champions League Elite league stage =

Asia premier club football tournament

The 2024–25 AFC Champions League Elite league stage was played from 16 September 2024 to 19 February 2025.

This was the first season with a single-league format for each region, which replaced the group format used until the previous season. A total of 12 national associations were represented in the league stage.

Gwangju FC made their debut appearances in the Champions League since the introduction of the group stage. This also marked Gwangju's debut appearances in Asian football. Gwangju's Jasir Asani was the first-ever goalscorer of the competition's league stage.

== Draw ==
The draw for the league stage took place on 16 August at the InterContinental Kuala Lumpur in Kuala Lumpur, Malaysia.

=== Seeding ===
For each region, the title holder or the highest seeded team from each member association involved were allocated into Pot 1, while the remaining teams were allocated into Pot 2.

Region	Pot 1	Pot 2
West Region	(United Arab Emirates) Al Ain (ACL); (Saudi Arabia) Al-Hilal (KSA 1); (Qatar) Al-Sadd (QAT 1); (Iran) Persepolis (IRN 1); (Uzbekistan) Pakhtakor (UZB 1); (Iraq) Al-Shorta (IRQ 1)	(Saudi Arabia) Al-Nassr (KSA 2); (Qatar) Al-Rayyan (QAT 2); (Iran) Esteghlal (IRN 2); (United Arab Emirates) Al Wasl (UAE 1); (Saudi Arabia) Al-Ahli (KSA 3); (Qatar) Al-Gharafa (QAT 3)
East Region	(Japan) Vissel Kobe (JPN 1); (South Korea) Ulsan HD (KOR 1); (China) Shanghai Port (CHN 1); (Thailand) Buriram United (THA 1); (Australia) Central Coast Mariners (AUS 1); (Malaysia) Johor Darul Ta'zim (MAS 1)	(Japan) Kawasaki Frontale (JPN 2); (South Korea) Pohang Steelers (KOR 2); (China) Shanghai Shenhua (CHN 2); (Japan) Yokohama F. Marinos (JPN 3); (South Korea) Gwangju FC (KOR 3); (China) Shandong Taishan (CHN 3)

=== Grid result ===
Each team was drawn a position in the draw grid for their region: column A–C for West and D–F for East. Teams from Pot 1 were drawn into positions 1 or 2 while teams from Pot 2 were drawn into positions 3 or 4.

Each position had pre-determined matchups as part of a pairings grid. Teams in each column played matches with the other columns in each region.

Column	A	B	C	D	E	F
Number	West Region			East Region		
1	(Uzbekistan) Pakhtakor	(Qatar) Al-Sadd	(Iran) Persepolis	(South Korea) Ulsan HD	(China) Shanghai Port	(Malaysia) Johor Darul Ta'zim
2	(Saudi Arabia) Al-Hilal	(Iraq) Al-Shorta	(United Arab Emirates) Al Ain	(Australia) Central Coast Mariners	(Thailand) Buriram United	(Japan) Vissel Kobe
3	(Saudi Arabia) Al-Nassr	(Qatar) Al-Rayyan	(Iran) Esteghlal	(South Korea) Pohang Steelers	(China) Shandong Taishan	(Japan) Yokohama F. Marinos
4	(Saudi Arabia) Al-Ahli	(Qatar) Al-Gharafa	(United Arab Emirates) Al Wasl	(South Korea) Gwangju FC	(China) Shanghai Shenhua	(Japan) Kawasaki Frontale

== Schedule ==
The schedule of the league stage was as follows.

Round	Dates (West region)	Dates (East region)
Matchday 1	16–17 September 2024	17–18 September 2024
Matchday 2	30 September–1 October 2024	1–2 October 2024
Matchday 3	21–22 October 2024	22–23 October 2024
Matchday 4	4–5 November 2024	5–6 November 2024
Matchday 5	25–26 November 2024	26–27 November 2024
Matchday 6	2–3 December 2024	3–4 December 2024
Matchday 7	3–4 February 2025	11–12 February 2025
Matchday 8	17–18 February 2025	18–19 February 2025

== League stage ==
The detailed schedule was announced on 16 August 2024 after the draw ceremony.

=== West Region ===
Pos	Team	Pld	W	D	L	GF	GA	GD	Pts	Qualification
1	(Saudi Arabia) Al-Hilal	8	7	1	0	26	7	+19	22	Advance to round of 16
2	(Saudi Arabia) Al-Ahli	8	7	1	0	21	8	+13	22	Advance to round of 16
3	(Saudi Arabia) Al-Nassr	8	5	2	1	17	6	+11	17	Advance to round of 16
4	(Qatar) Al-Sadd	8	3	3	2	10	9	+1	12	Advance to round of 16
5	(United Arab Emirates) Al Wasl	8	3	2	3	8	12	−4	11	Advance to round of 16
6	(Iran) Esteghlal	8	2	3	3	8	9	−1	9	Advance to round of 16
7	(Qatar) Al-Rayyan	8	2	2	4	8	12	−4	8	Advance to round of 16
8	(Uzbekistan) Pakhtakor	8	1	4	3	4	6	−2	7	Advance to round of 16
9	(Iran) Persepolis	8	1	4	3	6	10	−4	7	
10	(Qatar) Al-Gharafa	8	2	1	5	10	18	−8	7	
11	(Iraq) Al-Shorta	8	1	3	4	7	17	−10	6	
12	(United Arab Emirates) Al Ain	8	0	2	6	11	22	−11	2	

Source: Asian Football Confederation
Rules for classification: 1) points; 2) goal difference; 3) number of goals scored; 4) number of matches won; 5) penalty shoot-out if only two teams remain tied and played each other on the final matchday 6) fair play ranking; 7) drawing of lots

==== Results summary ====
Matchday 1
Home team	Score	Away team
Al Ain (United Arab Emirates)	1–1	(Qatar) Al-Sadd
Al-Shorta (Iraq)	1–1	(Saudi Arabia) Al-Nassr
Esteghlal (Iran)	3–0	(Qatar) Al-Gharafa
Al-Ahli (Saudi Arabia)	1–0	(Iran) Persepolis
Pakhtakor (Uzbekistan)	0–1	(United Arab Emirates) Al Wasl
Al-Rayyan (Qatar)	1–3	(Saudi Arabia) Al-Hilal

Matchday 2
Home team	Score	Away team
Al-Sadd (Qatar)	2–0	(Iran) Esteghlal
Persepolis (Iran)	1–1	(Uzbekistan) Pakhtakor
Al Wasl (United Arab Emirates)	0–2	(Saudi Arabia) Al-Ahli
Al-Nassr (Saudi Arabia)	2–1	(Qatar) Al-Rayyan
Al-Gharafa (Qatar)	4–2	(United Arab Emirates) Al Ain
Al-Hilal (Saudi Arabia)	5–0	(Iraq) Al-Shorta

Matchday 3
Home team	Score	Away team
Al-Shorta (Iraq)	0–0	(Uzbekistan) Pakhtakor
Al-Sadd (Qatar)	1–0	(Iran) Persepolis
Al Ain (United Arab Emirates)	4–5	(Saudi Arabia) Al-Hilal
Al-Rayyan (Qatar)	1–2	(Saudi Arabia) Al-Ahli
Esteghlal (Iran)	0–1	(Saudi Arabia) Al-Nassr
Al-Gharafa (Qatar)	1–2	(United Arab Emirates) Al Wasl

Matchday 4
Home team	Score	Away team
Al Wasl (United Arab Emirates)	1–1	(Qatar) Al-Sadd
Al-Ahli (Saudi Arabia)	5–1	(Iraq) Al-Shorta
Persepolis (Iran)	1–1	(Qatar) Al-Gharafa
Al-Hilal (Saudi Arabia)	3–0	(Iran) Esteghlal
Pakhtakor (Uzbekistan)	0–1	(Qatar) Al-Rayyan
Al-Nassr (Saudi Arabia)	5–1	(United Arab Emirates) Al Ain

Matchday 5
Home team	Score	Away team
Al Ain (United Arab Emirates)	1–2	(Saudi Arabia) Al-Ahli
Esteghlal (Iran)	0–0	(Uzbekistan) Pakhtakor
Al-Gharafa (Qatar)	1–3	(Saudi Arabia) Al-Nassr
Al-Rayyan (Qatar)	1–1	(Iran) Persepolis
Al-Shorta (Iraq)	1–3	(United Arab Emirates) Al Wasl
Al-Sadd (Qatar)	1–1	(Saudi Arabia) Al-Hilal

Matchday 6
Home team	Score	Away team
Persepolis (Iran)	2–1	(Iraq) Al-Shorta
Al-Ahli (Saudi Arabia)	2–2	(Iran) Esteghlal
Al Wasl (United Arab Emirates)	1–1	(Qatar) Al-Rayyan
Al-Nassr (Saudi Arabia)	1–2	(Qatar) Al-Sadd
Pakhtakor (Uzbekistan)	1–1	(United Arab Emirates) Al Ain
Al-Hilal (Saudi Arabia)	3–0	(Qatar) Al-Gharafa

Matchday 7
Home team	Score	Away team
Al Ain (United Arab Emirates)	1–2	(Qatar) Al-Rayyan
Esteghlal (Iran)	1–1	(Iraq) Al-Shorta
Al-Sadd (Qatar)	1–3	(Saudi Arabia) Al-Ahli
Al-Nassr (Saudi Arabia)	4–0	(United Arab Emirates) Al Wasl
Al-Gharafa (Qatar)	1–0	(Uzbekistan) Pakhtakor
Al-Hilal (Saudi Arabia)	4–1	(Iran) Persepolis

Matchday 8
Home team	Score	Away team
Pakhtakor (Uzbekistan)	2–1	(Qatar) Al-Sadd
Al-Shorta (Iraq)	2–0	(United Arab Emirates) Al Ain
Persepolis (Iran)	0–0	(Saudi Arabia) Al-Nassr
Al-Ahli (Saudi Arabia)	4–2	(Qatar) Al-Gharafa
Al-Rayyan (Qatar)	0–2	(Iran) Esteghlal
Al Wasl (United Arab Emirates)	0–2	(Saudi Arabia) Al-Hilal

==== Matches ====
===== Matchday 1 =====
16 September 2024
20:00 UTC+4

Al Ain (United Arab Emirates)	1–1	(Qatar) Al-Sadd
M. Palacios 80'	Report	Afif 45+1'

Hazza bin Zayed Stadium, Al Ain
Attendance: 18,926
Referee: Sadullo Gulmurodi (Tajikistan)

16 September 2024
19:00 UTC+3

Al-Shorta (Iraq)	1–1	(Saudi Arabia) Al-Nassr
Dawood Yaseen 24'	Report	Al-Ghannam 14'

Al-Madina International Stadium, Baghdad (Note: Al-Shorta played their home matches at Al-Madina International Stadium and Al-Zawraa Stadium, Baghdad, and Karbala International Stadium, Karbala, instead of their regular home stadium Al-Shaab Stadium, Baghdad.)
Attendance: 29,270
Referee: Ahmed Al-Ali (Kuwait)

16 September 2024
21:30 UTC+3:30

Esteghlal (Iran)	3–0	(Qatar) Al-Gharafa
A. Yousif 4' (o.g.); Rezaeian 79'; Rezavand 88'	Report

Shahr-e Qods Stadium, Shahr-e Qods
Attendance: 8,572
Referee: Ma Ning (China)

16 September 2024
21:00 UTC+3

Al-Ahli (Saudi Arabia)	1–0	(Iran) Persepolis
Kessié 2'	Report

Prince Abdullah Al-Faisal Sports City Stadium, Jeddah
Attendance: 15,170
Referee: Adham Makhadmeh (Jordan)

17 September 2024
19:00 UTC+5

Pakhtakor (Uzbekistan)	0–1	(United Arab Emirates) Al Wasl
	Report	Bouftini 64'

JAR Stadium, Tashkent (Note: Pakhtakor played their home matches at JAR Stadium, Tashkent, instead of their regular home stadium Pakhtakor Central Stadium, Tashkent.)
Attendance: 3,750
Referee: Yusuke Araki (Japan)

17 September 2024
19:00 UTC+3

Al-Rayyan (Qatar)	1–3	(Saudi Arabia) Al-Hilal
Guedes 47'	Report	Milinković-Savić 15'; Cancelo 42'; Marcos Leonardo 44'

Ahmad bin Ali Stadium, Al Rayyan
Attendance: 23,471
Referee: Kim Jong-hyeok (South Korea)

===== Matchday 2 =====
30 September 2024
19:00 UTC+3

Al-Sadd (Qatar)	2–0	(Iran) Esteghlal
H. Hosseini 40' (o.g.); Afif 68' (pen.)	Report

Jassim bin Hamad Stadium, Al Rayyan
Attendance: 6,599
Referee: Kim Jong-hyeok (South Korea)

30 September 2024
19:30 UTC+3:30

Persepolis (Iran)	1–1	(Uzbekistan) Pakhtakor
Alipour 1'	Report	D. Ćeran 59'

Shahr-e Qods Stadium, Shahr-e Qods
Attendance: 6,942
Referee: Abdullah Jamali (Kuwait)

30 September 2024
20:00 UTC+4

Al Wasl (United Arab Emirates)	0–2	(Saudi Arabia) Al-Ahli
	Report	Mahrez 3'; Ibañez 38'

Zabeel Stadium, Dubai
Attendance: 5,731
Referee: Kim Hee-gon (South Korea)

30 September 2024
21:00 UTC+3

Al-Nassr (Saudi Arabia)	2–1	(Qatar) Al-Rayyan
Mané 45+1'; Ronaldo 76'	Report	Guedes 87'

Al-Awwal Park, Riyadh
Attendance: 14,547
Referee: Shaun Evans (Australia)

1 October 2024
19:00 UTC+3

Al-Gharafa (Qatar)	4–2	(United Arab Emirates) Al Ain
Joselu 45+2', 48'; Sano 54'; Brahimi 76'	Report	Kaku 56' (pen.); Rahimi 66'

Al Bayt Stadium, Al Khor (Note: Al-Gharafa played their home matches at Al Bayt Stadium, Al Khor, instead of their regular home stadium Thani bin Jassim Stadium, Al Rayyan.)
Attendance: 3,878
Referee: Hiroyuki Kimura (Japan)

1 October 2024
21:00 UTC+3

Al-Hilal (Saudi Arabia)	5–0	(Iraq) Al-Shorta
Marcos Leonardo 11'; Mitrović 15'; S. Al-Dawsari 47'; N. Al-Dawsari 73'; Kanno 90+5'	Report

Prince Faisal bin Fahd Sports City, Riyadh
Attendance: 12,434
Referee: Qasim Al-Hatmi (Oman)

===== Matchday 3 =====
21 October 2024
19:00 UTC+3

Al-Shorta (Iraq)	0–0	(Uzbekistan) Pakhtakor
	Report

Karbala International Stadium, Karbala
Attendance: 7,500
Referee: Ma Ning (China)

21 October 2024
19:00 UTC+3

Al-Sadd (Qatar)	1–0	(Iran) Persepolis
Uribe 45+2'	Report

Jassim bin Hamad Stadium, Al Rayyan
Attendance: 4,071
Referee: Yusuke Araki (Japan)

21 October 2024
20:00 UTC+4

Al Ain (United Arab Emirates)	4–5	(Saudi Arabia) Al-Hilal
Rahimi 39', 67', 90+6' (pen.); Sanabria 63'	Report	Lodi 26'; Milinković-Savić 45+2'; S. Al-Dawsari 45+5', 65', 75'

Hazza bin Zayed Stadium, Al Ain
Attendance: 24,126
Referee: Nazmi Nasaruddin (Malaysia)

21 October 2024
21:00 UTC+3

Al-Rayyan (Qatar)	1–2	(Saudi Arabia) Al-Ahli
Al-Hamad 65' (o.g.)	Report	Veiga 16'; Al-Buraikan 38'

Ahmad bin Ali Stadium, Al Rayyan
Attendance: 8,377
Referee: Ahmed Al-Ali (Kuwait)

22 October 2024
20:00 UTC+4

Esteghlal (Iran)	0–1	(Saudi Arabia) Al Nassr
	Report	Laporte 81'

Rashid Stadium, Dubai (United Arab Emirates) (Note: Iranian clubs were required to play their home matches at neutral venues due to security concerns relating to the October 2024 Israeli strikes on Iran.)
Attendance: 7,600
Referee: Adham Makhadmeh (Jordan)

22 October 2024
19:00 UTC+3

Al-Gharafa (Qatar)	1–2	(United Arab Emirates) Al Wasl
Sassi 44'	Report	Lima 84'; Success 90+2'

Al Bayt Stadium, Al Khor
Attendance: 4,831
Referee: Ko Hyung-jin (South Korea)

===== Matchday 4 =====
4 November 2024
18:00 UTC+4

Al Wasl (United Arab Emirates)	1–1	(Qatar) Al-Sadd
Pérez 29'	Report	Saïss 61'

Zabeel Stadium, Dubai
Attendance: 3,376
Referee: Nazmi Nasaruddin (Malaysia)

4 November 2024
19:00 UTC+3

Al-Ahli (Saudi Arabia)	5–1	(Iraq) Al-Shorta
Firmino 14', 45+5'; Al-Buraikan 53'; Mahrez 61', 65'	Report	Jassim 29'

King Abdullah Sports City Stadium, Jeddah
Attendance: 10,395
Referee: Sadullo Gulmurodi (Tajikistan)

4 November 2024
20:00 UTC+4

Persepolis (Iran)	1–1	(Qatar) Al-Gharafa
Faraji 53'	Report	Al Ganehi 56'

Al Maktoum Stadium, Dubai (United Arab Emirates)
Attendance: 3,941
Referee: Kim Hee-gon (South Korea)

4 November 2024
21:00 UTC+3

Al-Hilal (Saudi Arabia)	3–0	(Iran) Esteghlal
Mitrović 15', 33', 74'	Report

Kingdom Arena, Riyadh
Attendance: 17,840
Referee: Ko Hyung-jin (South Korea)

5 November 2024
19:00 UTC+5

Pakhtakor (Uzbekistan)	0–1	(Qatar) Al-Rayyan
	Report	Shehata 51'

JAR Stadium, Tashkent
Attendance: 2,142
Referee: Jumpei Iida (Japan)

5 November 2024
21:00 UTC+3

Al-Nassr (Saudi Arabia)	5–1	(United Arab Emirates) Al Ain
Talisca 5', 90+4'; Ronaldo 31'; Cardoso 37' (o.g.); Wesley 81'	Report	Bento 56' (o.g.)

Al-Awwal Park, Riyadh
Attendance: 23,324
Referee: Ma Ning (China)

===== Matchday 5 =====
25 November 2024
20:00 UTC+4

Al Ain (United Arab Emirates)	1–2	(Saudi Arabia) Al-Ahli
Kaku 90+3'	Report	Toney 70', 74'

Hazza bin Zayed Stadium, Al Ain
Attendance: 17,126
Referee: Adham Makhadmeh (Jordan)

25 November 2024
20:00 UTC+4

Esteghlal (Iran)	0–0	(Uzbekistan) Pakhtakor
	Report

Rashid Stadium, Dubai (United Arab Emirates)
Attendance: 1,208
Referee: Qasim Al-Hatmi (Oman)

25 November 2024
19:00 UTC+3

Al-Gharafa (Qatar)	1–3	(Saudi Arabia) Al-Nassr
Joselu 75'	Report	Ronaldo 46', 64'; Ângelo 58'

Al Bayt Stadium, Al Khor
Attendance: 37,293
Referee: Shaun Evans (Australia)

25 November 2024
19:00 UTC+3

Al-Rayyan (Qatar)	1–1	(Iran) Persepolis
Bencharki 57'	Report	Faraji 17'

Ahmad bin Ali Stadium, Al Rayyan
Attendance: 5,136
Referee: Fu Ming (China)

26 November 2024
19:00 UTC+3

Al-Shorta (Iraq)	1–3	(United Arab Emirates) Al Wasl
Youssef 50'	Report	Santos 14'; Lima 64' (pen.); Giménez 90+2' (pen.)

Karbala International Stadium, Karbala
Attendance: 7,643
Referee: Yusuke Araki (Japan)

26 November 2024
19:00 UTC+3

Al-Sadd (Qatar)	1–1	(Saudi Arabia) Al-Hilal
Otávio 71'	Report	Al-Bulaihi 10'

Jassim bin Hamad Stadium, Al Rayyan
Attendance: 11,327
Referee: Kim Jong-hyeok (South Korea)

===== Matchday 6 =====
2 December 2024
17:00 UTC+3

Persepolis (Iran)	2–1	(Iraq) Al-Shorta
Urunov 89'; Gvelesiani 90+13' (pen.)	Report	Ali 19'

Hamad bin Khalifa Stadium, Doha (Qatar)
Attendance: 530
Referee: Kim Dae-yong (South Korea)

2 December 2024
19:00 UTC+3

Al-Ahli (Saudi Arabia)	2–2	(Iran) Esteghlal
Toney 45+8' (pen.), 86' (pen.)	Report	Raphael Silva 42'; Eslami 51'

King Abdullah Sports City Stadium, Jeddah
Attendance: 16,099
Referee: Ma Ning (China)

2 December 2024
20:00 UTC+4

Al Wasl (United Arab Emirates)	1–1	(Qatar) Al-Rayyan
Caio 77'	Report	Al-Azizi 85' (o.g.)

Zabeel Stadium, Dubai
Attendance: 3,852
Referee: Muhammad Taqi (Singapore)

2 December 2024
21:00 UTC+3

Al-Nassr (Saudi Arabia)	1–2	(Qatar) Al-Sadd
Saïss 80' (o.g.)	Report	Afif 53'; Ounas 90+9' (pen.)

Al-Awwal Park, Riyadh
Attendance: 13,091
Referee: Yusuke Araki (Japan)

3 December 2024
19:00 UTC+5

Pakhtakor (Uzbekistan)	1–1	(United Arab Emirates) Al Ain
Jurakuziev 6'	Report	Rahimi 49'

JAR Stadium, Tashkent
Attendance: 1,511
Referee: Ahmad Al Ali (Kuwait)

3 December 2024
21:00 UTC+3

Al-Hilal (Saudi Arabia)	3–0	(Qatar) Al-Gharafa
Marcos Leonardo 18'; Mitrović 82'; Milinković-Savić 85'	Report

Kingdom Arena, Riyadh
Attendance: 18,344
Referee: Adham Makhadmeh (Jordan)

===== Matchday 7 =====
3 February 2025
18:00 UTC+4

Al Ain (United Arab Emirates)	1–2	(Qatar) Al-Rayyan
Kaku 42'	Report	Trézéguet 50'; Guedes 75'

Hazza bin Zayed Stadium, Al Ain
Attendance: 6,326
Referee: Khalid Al-Turais (Saudi Arabia)

3 February 2025
19:30 UTC+3:30

Esteghlal (Iran)	1–1	(Iraq) Al-Shorta
Kojo 4'	Report	Amin 49'

Azadi Stadium, Tehran
Attendance: 54,873
Referee: Yusuke Araki (Japan)

3 February 2025
19:00 UTC+3

Al-Sadd (Qatar)	1–3	(Saudi Arabia) Al-Ahli
Afif 1'	Report	Firmino 10'; Ibañez 39'; Mahrez 81'

Jassim bin Hamad Stadium, Al Rayyan
Attendance: 9,335
Referee: Adel Al-Naqbi (United Arab Emirates)

3 February 2025
21:00 UTC+3

Al-Nassr (Saudi Arabia)	4–0	(United Arab Emirates) Al Wasl
Al-Hassan 25'; Ronaldo 44' (pen.), 78'; Al-Fatil 88'	Report

Al-Awwal Park, Riyadh
Attendance: 20,384
Referee: Ahmed Al-Kaf (Oman)
4 February 2025
19:00 UTC+3

Al-Gharafa (Qatar)	1–0	(Uzbekistan) Pakhtakor
Sassi 40'	Report

Thani bin Jassim Stadium, Al Rayyan
Attendance: 1,962
Referee: Alireza Faghani (Australia)

4 February 2025
21:00 UTC+3

Al-Hilal (Saudi Arabia)	4–1	(Iran) Persepolis
Malcom 10'; Cancelo 25'; S. Al-Dawsari 38', 45+1'	Report	Gvelesiani 90' (pen.)

Kingdom Arena, Riyadh
Attendance: 24,460
Referee: Ma Ning (China)

===== Matchday 8 =====
17 February 2025
19:00 UTC+5

Pakhtakor (Uzbekistan)	2–1	(Qatar) Al-Sadd
Riascos 18', 56'	Report	Al-Haydos 37' (pen.)

JAR Stadium, Tashkent
Attendance: 5,000
Referee: Shaun Evans (Australia)

17 February 2025
19:00 UTC+3

Al-Shorta (Iraq)	2–0	(United Arab Emirates) Al Ain
Al-Mawas 50'; Lucas 90+4'	Report

Al-Zawraa Stadium, Baghdad
Attendance: 2,772
Referee: Abdulrahman Al-Jassim (Qatar)

17 February 2025
19:30 UTC+3:30

Persepolis (Iran)	0–0	(Saudi Arabia) Al-Nassr
	Report

Azadi Stadium, Tehran
Attendance: 70,350
Referee: Rustam Lutfullin (Uzbekistan)

17 February 2025
21:00 UTC+3

Al-Ahli (Saudi Arabia)	4–2	(Qatar) Al-Gharafa
Toney 21'; Firmino 34'; Galeno 44'; Mahrez 59' (pen.)	Report	Joselu 6' (pen.); Brahimi 80' (pen.)

King Abdullah Sports City Stadium, Jeddah
Attendance: 12,860
Referee: Omar Al-Ali (United Arab Emirates)

18 February 2025
19:00 UTC+3

Al-Rayyan (Qatar)	0–2	(Iran) Esteghlal
	Report	Azadi 46'; Koushki 69'

Ahmad bin Ali Stadium, Al Rayyan
Attendance: 3,712
Referee: Sadullo Gulmurodi (Tajikistan)

18 February 2025
20:00 UTC+4

Al Wasl (United Arab Emirates)	0–2	(Saudi Arabia) Al-Hilal
	Report	Marcos Leonardo 13'; S. Al-Dawsari 49'

Zabeel Stadium, Dubai
Attendance: 5,414
Referee: Ahmad Al-Ali (Kuwait)

=== East Region ===
Pos	Team	Pld	W	D	L	GF	GA	GD	Pts	Qualification
1	(Japan) Yokohama F. Marinos	7	6	0	1	21	7	+14	18	Advance to round of 16
2	(Japan) Kawasaki Frontale	7	5	0	2	13	4	+9	15	Advance to round of 16
3	(Malaysia) Johor Darul Ta'zim	7	4	2	1	16	8	+8	14	Advance to round of 16
4	(South Korea) Gwangju	7	4	2	1	15	9	+6	14	Advance to round of 16
5	(Japan) Vissel Kobe	7	4	1	2	14	9	+5	13	Advance to round of 16
6	(Thailand) Buriram United	8	3	3	2	7	12	−5	12	Advance to round of 16
7	(China) Shanghai Shenhua	8	3	1	4	13	12	+1	10	Advance to round of 16
8	(China) Shanghai Port	8	2	2	4	10	18	−8	8	Advance to round of 16
9	(South Korea) Pohang Steelers	7	2	0	5	9	17	−8	6	
10	(South Korea) Ulsan HD	7	1	0	6	4	16	−12	3	
11	(Australia) Central Coast Mariners	7	0	1	6	8	18	−10	1	
12	(China) Shandong Taishan	0	0	0	0	0	0	0	0	Withdrawn, record expunged (Note: Shandong Taishan were considered to have withdrawn from the AFC Champions League Elite after the club confirmed that it did not intend to report for their league stage match against Ulsan HD on 19 February 2025. Their remaining fixture was cancelled, with their seven played matches being expunged.)

Source: Asian Football Confederation
Rules for classification: 1) points; 2) goal difference; 3) number of goals scored; 4) number of matches won; 5) penalty shoot-out if only two teams remain tied and played each other on the final matchday 6) fair play ranking; 7) drawing of lots

==== Results summary ====
Matchday 1
Home team	Score	Away team
Gwangju FC (South Korea)	7–3	(Japan) Yokohama F. Marinos
Shandong Taishan (China)	~~3–1~~	(Australia) Central Coast Mariners
Buriram United (Thailand)	0–0	(Japan) Vissel Kobe
Shanghai Shenhua (China)	4–1	(South Korea) Pohang Steelers
Ulsan HD (South Korea)	0–1	(Japan) Kawasaki Frontale
Shanghai Port (China)	2–2	(Malaysia) Johor Darul Ta'zim

Matchday 2
Home team	Score	Away team
Central Coast Mariners (Australia)	1–2	(Thailand) Buriram United
Kawasaki Frontale (Japan)	0–1	(South Korea) Gwangju FC
Pohang Steelers (South Korea)	3–0	(China) Shanghai Port
Johor Darul Ta'zim (Malaysia)	3–0	(China) Shanghai Shenhua
Vissel Kobe (Japan)	~~2–1~~	(China) Shandong Taishan
Yokohama F. Marinos (Japan)	4–0	(South Korea) Ulsan HD

Matchday 3
Home team	Score	Away team
Gwangju FC (South Korea)	3–1	(Malaysia) Johor Darul Ta'zim
Shanghai Port (China)	3–2	(Australia) Central Coast Mariners
Shandong Taishan (China)	~~2–2~~	(Japan) Yokohama F. Marinos
Buriram United (Thailand)	1–0	(South Korea) Pohang Steelers
Ulsan HD (South Korea)	0–2	(Japan) Vissel Kobe
Shanghai Shenhua (China)	2–0	(Japan) Kawasaki Frontale

Matchday 4
Home team	Score	Away team
Central Coast Mariners (Australia)	2–2	(China) Shanghai Shenhua
Kawasaki Frontale (Japan)	3–1	(China) Shanghai Port
Vissel Kobe (Japan)	2–0	(South Korea) Gwangju FC
Johor Darul Ta'zim (Malaysia)	3–0	(South Korea) Ulsan HD
Pohang Steelers (South Korea)	~~4–2~~	(China) Shandong Taishan
Yokohama F. Marinos (Japan)	5–0	(Thailand) Buriram United

Matchday 5
Home team	Score	Away team
Vissel Kobe (Japan)	3–2	(Australia) Central Coast Mariners
Ulsan HD (South Korea)	1–3	(China) Shanghai Port
Shandong Taishan (China)	~~1–0~~	(Malaysia) Johor Darul Ta'zim
Buriram United (Thailand)	0–3	(Japan) Kawasaki Frontale
Gwangju FC (South Korea)	1–0	(China) Shanghai Shenhua
Yokohama F. Marinos (Japan)	2–0	(South Korea) Pohang Steelers

Matchday 6
Home team	Score	Away team
Central Coast Mariners (Australia)	0–4	(Japan) Yokohama F. Marinos
Pohang Steelers (South Korea)	3–1	(Japan) Vissel Kobe
Johor Darul Ta'zim (Malaysia)	0–0	(Thailand) Buriram United
Shanghai Port (China)	1–1	(South Korea) Gwangju FC
Kawasaki Frontale (Japan)	~~4–0~~	(China) Shandong Taishan
Shanghai Shenhua (China)	1–2	(South Korea) Ulsan HD

Matchday 7
Home team	Score	Away team
Central Coast Mariners (Australia)	1–2	(Malaysia) Johor Darul Ta'zim
Vissel Kobe (Japan)	4–0	(China) Shanghai Port
Pohang Steelers (South Korea)	0–4	(Japan) Kawasaki Frontale
Shandong Taishan (China)	~~3–1~~	(South Korea) Gwangju FC
Yokohama F. Marinos (Japan)	1–0	(China) Shanghai Shenhua
Buriram United (Thailand)	2–1	(South Korea) Ulsan HD

Matchday 8
Home team	Score	Away team
Gwangju FC (South Korea)	2–2	(Thailand) Buriram United
Kawasaki Frontale (Japan)	2–0	(Australia) Central Coast Mariners
Shanghai Shenhua (China)	4–2	(Japan) Vissel Kobe
Johor Darul Ta'zim (Malaysia)	5–2	(South Korea) Pohang Steelers
Ulsan HD (South Korea)	~~Canc.~~	(China) Shandong Taishan
Shanghai Port (China)	0–2	(Japan) Yokohama F. Marinos

==== Matches ====
===== Matchday 1 =====
17 September 2024
19:00 UTC+9

Gwangju FC (South Korea)	7–3	(Japan) Yokohama F. Marinos
Asani 2', 55', 90+2'; Oh Hu-seong 15'; Mikeltadze 69'; Lee Heui-kyun 72'; Gabriel Tigrão 75'	Report	Élber 34', 59'; Nishimura 85'

Gwangju World Cup Stadium, Gwangju
Attendance: 7,126
Referee: Alireza Faghani (Iran)

17 September 2024
18:00 UTC+8

Shandong Taishan (China)	Voided (3–1)	(Australia) Central Coast Mariners
Bi Jinhao 8'; Qazaishvili 74', 88'	Report	Mikael Doka 45+9' (pen.)

Jinan Olympic Sports Center, Jinan
Attendance: 16,896
Referee: Khalid Al-Turais (Saudi Arabia)

17 September 2024
19:00 UTC+7

Buriram United (Thailand)	0–0	(Japan) Vissel Kobe
	Report

Buriram Stadium, Buriram
Attendance: 16,793
Referee: Muhammad Taqi (Singapore)

17 September 2024
20:00 UTC+8

Shanghai Shenhua (China)	4–1	(South Korea) Pohang Steelers
André Luis 64'; Malele 71', 82' (pen.); Gao Tianyi 84'	Report	Jorge Luiz 53'

Shanghai Stadium, Shanghai
Attendance: 23,849
Referee: Salman Falahi (Qatar)

18 September 2024
19:00 UTC+9

Ulsan HD (South Korea)	0–1	(Japan) Kawasaki Frontale
	Report	Marcio Augusto 54'

Ulsan Munsu Football Stadium, Ulsan
Attendance: 9,673
Referee: Omar Al-Ali (United Arab Emirates)

18 September 2024
20:00 UTC+8

Shanghai Port (China)	2–2	(Malaysia) Johor Darul Ta'zim
Gustavo Henrique 48'; W. Popp 73'	Report	Arif Aiman 45', 56'

Pudong Football Stadium, Shanghai
Attendance: 12,533
Referee: Ahmed Al-Kaf (Oman)

===== Matchday 2 =====
1 October 2024
18:00 UTC+10

Central Coast Mariners (Australia)	1–2	(Thailand) Buriram United
Mauragis 90+5'	Report	Guilherme Bissoli 29'; Good 50'

Central Coast Stadium, Gosford
Attendance: 3,483
Referee: Nazmi Nasaruddin (Malaysia)

1 October 2024
19:00 UTC+9

Kawasaki Frontale (Japan)	0–1	(South Korea) Gwangju FC
	Report	Asani 21' (pen.)

Kawasaki Todoroki Stadium, Kawasaki
Attendance: 12,527
Referee: Mohanad Qasim Sarray (Iraq)

1 October 2024
19:00 UTC+9

Pohang Steelers (South Korea)	3–0	(China) Shanghai Port
Wanderson Carvalho 51'; Hong Yun-sang 64'; Han Chan-hee 70'	Report

Pohang Steel Yard, Pohang
Attendance: 5,309
Referee: Mooud Bonyadifard (Iran)

1 October 2024
20:00 UTC+8

Johor Darul Ta'zim (Malaysia)	3–0	(China) Shanghai Shenhua
Arif Aiman 11'; Jorge Obregón 25'; Juan Muñiz 79'	Report

Sultan Ibrahim Stadium, Johor Bahru
Attendance: 31,386
Referee: Adel Al-Naqbi (United Arab Emirates)

2 October 2024
19:00 UTC+9

Vissel Kobe (Japan)	Voided (2–1)	(China) Shandong Taishan
Miyashiro 13'; Sakai 50'	Report	Cryzan 28'

Kobe City Misaki Park Stadium, Kobe
Attendance: 6,045
Referee: Abdulrahman Al-Jassim (Qatar)

2 October 2024
19:00 UTC+9

Yokohama F. Marinos (Japan)	4–0	(South Korea) Ulsan HD
Watanabe 4'; Nishimura 44'; Anderson Lopes 83'; Mizunuma 90+2'	Report

Nissan Stadium, Yokohama
Attendance: 8,153
Referee: Mohammed Al-Hoaish (Saudi Arabia)

===== Matchday 3 =====
22 October 2024
19:00 UTC+9

Gwangju FC (South Korea)	3–1	(Malaysia) Johor Darul Ta'zim
Asani 3', 6'; Park Jun-heong 88' (o.g.)	Report	Feroz Baharudin 28'

Yongin Mireu Stadium, Yongin (Note: Gwangju FC played their home matches at Yongin Mireu Stadium, Yongin, instead of their regular home stadium Gwangju World Cup Stadium or Gwangju Football Stadium, Gwangju.)
Attendance: 2,101
Referee: Salman Falahi (Qatar)

22 October 2024
18:00 UTC+8

Shanghai Port (China)	3–2	(Australia) Central Coast Mariners
Li Ang 2'; Wu Lei 41'; Matías Vargas 86'	Report	Mikael Doka 60'; Nicholas Duarte 90+3'

Pudong Football Stadium, Shanghai
Attendance: 10,728
Referee: Sadullo Gulmurodi (Tajikistan)

22 October 2024
20:00 UTC+8

Shandong Taishan (China)	Voided (2–2)	(Japan) Yokohama F. Marinos
Cryzan 43'; Zheng Zheng 90+2'	Report	Anderson Lopes 54'; Yan Matheus 86'

Jinan Olympic Sports Center Stadium, Jinan
Attendance: 24,796
Referee: Omar Al-Ali (United Arab Emirates)

22 October 2024
19:00 UTC+7

Buriram United (Thailand)	1–0	(South Korea) Pohang Steelers
Guilherme Bissoli 55'	Report

Buriram Stadium, Buriram
Attendance: 25,206
Referee: Khalid Al-Turais (Saudi Arabia)

23 October 2024
19:00 UTC+9

Ulsan HD (South Korea)	0–2	(Japan) Vissel Kobe
	Report	Miyashiro 47', 73'

Ulsan Stadium, Ulsan (Note: Ulsan HD played their home matches at Ulsan Stadium, Ulsan, instead of their regular home stadium Ulsan Munsu Football Stadium, Ulsan.)
Attendance: 5,371
Referee: Alireza Faghani (Iran)

23 October 2024
20:00 UTC+8

Shanghai Shenhua (China)	2–0	(Japan) Kawasaki Frontale
Wang Haijian 24'; André Luis 90+2' (pen.)	Report

Shanghai Stadium, Shanghai
Attendance: 23,102
Referee: Muhammad Taqi (Singapore)

===== Matchday 4 =====
5 November 2024
19:00 UTC+11

Central Coast Mariners (Australia)	2–2	(China) Shanghai Shenhua
Sabit Ngor 74'; Bailey Brandtman 90+5'	Report	André Luis 50'; Yu Hanchao 64'

Central Coast Stadium, Gosford
Attendance: 3,080
Referee: Mohanad Qasim Sarray (Iraq)

5 November 2024
19:00 UTC+9

Kawasaki Frontale (Japan)	3–1	(China) Shanghai Port
Ienaga 11'; Segawa 13'; Van Wermeskerken 33'	Report	Matías Vargas 82'

Kawasaki Todoroki Stadium, Kawasaki
Attendance: 11,757
Referee: Salman Falahi (Qatar)

5 November 2024
19:00 UTC+9

Vissel Kobe (Japan)	2–0	(South Korea) Gwangju FC
Miyashiro 45+3' (pen.); Sasaki 54'	Report

Kobe City Misaki Park Stadium, Kobe
Attendance: 6,567
Referee: Mohammed Al Hoaish (Saudi Arabia)

5 November 2024
20:00 UTC+8

Johor Darul Ta'zim (Malaysia)	3–0	(South Korea) Ulsan HD
Arif Aiman 7'; Óscar Pasero 67'; Bérgson 88'	Report

Sultan Ibrahim Stadium, Johor Bahru
Attendance: 34,236
Referee: Adham Makhadmeh (Jordan)

6 November 2024
19:00 UTC+9

Pohang Steelers (South Korea)	Voided (4–2)	(China) Shandong Taishan
Jeong Jae-hee 30'; Jorge Luiz 63'; Wanderson 68'; Oberdan 76'	Report	Chen Pu 32'; Bi Jinhao 90+3'

Pohang Steel Yard, Pohang
Attendance: 4,620
Referee: Ahmed Al-Kaf (Oman)

6 November 2024
19:00 UTC+9

Yokohama F. Marinos (Japan)	5–0	(Thailand) Buriram United
Inoue 10'; Anderson Lopes 45+1' (pen.), 56'; Neil Etheridge 45+3' (o.g.); Uenaka 66'	Report

Nissan Stadium, Yokohama
Attendance: 8,144
Referee: Ali Saeed Al Naqbi (United Arab Emirates)

===== Matchday 5 =====
26 November 2024
19:00 UTC+9

Vissel Kobe (Japan)	3–2	(Australia) Central Coast Mariners
Kikuchi 40'; Roux 49' (o.g.); Sasaki 81'	Report	Yamaguchi 54' (o.g.); Bailey Brandtman 74'

Kobe City Misaki Park Stadium, Kobe
Attendance: 6,009
Referee: Omar Al-Ali (United Arab Emirates)

26 November 2024
19:00 UTC+9

Ulsan HD (South Korea)	1–3	(China) Shanghai Port
Joo Min-kyu 73'	Report	Matías Vargas 11', 23', 83'

Ulsan Munsu Football Stadium, Ulsan
Attendance: 3,121
Referee: Nazmi Nasaruddin (Malaysia)

26 November 2024
20:00 UTC+8

Shandong Taishan (China)	Voided (1–0)	(Malaysia) Johor Darul Ta'zim
Zeca 68'	Report

Jinan Olympic Sports Center Stadium, Jinan
Attendance: 9,763
Referee: Alireza Faghani (Iran)

26 November 2024
19:00 UTC+7

Buriram United (Thailand)	0–3	(Japan) Kawasaki Frontale
	Report	Miura 79'; Tono 90+4'; Kanda 90+7'

Buriram Stadium, Buriram
Attendance: 16,902
Referee: Mohammed Al-Hoaish (Saudi Arabia)

27 November 2024
19:00 UTC+9

Gwangju FC (South Korea)	1–0	(China) Shanghai Shenhua
Asani 58'	Report

Gwangju World Cup Stadium, Gwangju
Attendance: 3,379
Referee: Ahmad Al-Ali (Jordan)

27 November 2024
19:00 UTC+9

Yokohama F. Marinos (Japan)	2–0	(South Korea) Pohang Steelers
Yan Matheus 41'; Anderson Lopes 90+5' (pen.)	Report

Nissan Stadium, Yokohama
Attendance: 8,932
Referee: Abdulrahman Al-Jassim (Qatar)

===== Matchday 6 =====
3 December 2024
19:00 UTC+11

Central Coast Mariners (Australia)	0–4	(Japan) Yokohama F. Marinos
	Report	Inoue 6', 30'; Anderson Lopes 36'; Amano 70'

Central Coast Stadium, Gosford
Attendance: 1,864
Referee: Rustam Luftullin (Uzbekistan)

3 December 2024
19:00 UTC+9

Pohang Steelers (South Korea)	3–1	(Japan) Vissel Kobe
Han Chan-hee 13'; Kim In-sung 20'; Jeong Jae-hee 90+1'	Report	Sasaki 34' (pen.)

Pohang Steel Yard, Pohang
Attendance: 4,149
Referee: Alireza Faghani (Iran)

3 December 2024
20:00 UTC+8

Johor Darul Ta'zim (Malaysia)	0–0	(Thailand) Buriram United
	Report

Sultan Ibrahim Stadium, Johor Bahru
Attendance: 31,687
Referee: Khalid Al-Turais (Saudi Arabia)

3 December 2024
20:00 UTC+8

Shanghai Port (China)	1–1	(South Korea) Gwangju FC
Oscar 76' (pen.)	Report	Heo Yool 38'

Pudong Football Stadium, Shanghai
Attendance: 15,108
Referee: Ahmed Al-Kaf (Oman)

4 December 2024
19:00 UTC+9

Kawasaki Frontale (Japan)	Voided (4–0)	(China) Shandong Taishan
Marcinho 3'; Yamamoto 41'; Jesiel 65'; Yamada 90'	Report

Kawasaki Todoroki Stadium, Kawasaki
Attendance: 13,840
Referee: Adel Al-Naqbi (United Arab Emirates)

4 December 2024
20:00 UTC+8

Shanghai Shenhua (China)	1–2	(South Korea) Ulsan HD
André Luis 23'	Report	Yago Cariello 58' (pen.); Kang Min-woo 66'

Shanghai Stadium, Shanghai
Attendance: 26,191
Referee: Salman Falahi (Qatar)

===== Matchday 7 =====
11 February 2025
19:00 UTC+11

Central Coast Mariners (Australia)	1–2	(Malaysia) Johor Darul Ta'zim
Kuol 70'	Report	Álvaro 64', 79'

Central Coast Stadium, Gosford
Attendance: 1,610
Referee: Ko Hyung-jin (South Korea)

11 February 2025
19:00 UTC+9

Vissel Kobe (Japan)	4–0	(China) Shanghai Port
Muto 11'; Kuwasaki 54'; Yuruki 56'; Osako 81'	Report

Kobe City Misaki Park Stadium, Kobe
Attendance: 5,800
Referee: Abdulrahman Al-Jassim (Qatar)

11 February 2025
19:00 UTC+9

Pohang Steelers (South Korea)	0–4	(Japan) Kawasaki Frontale
	Report	Yamada 38'; Wakizaka 71'; Kawahara 74'; Erison 88'

Pohang Steel Yard, Pohang
Attendance: 4,007
Referee: Nazmi Nasaruddin (Malaysia)

11 February 2025
20:00 UTC+8

Shandong Taishan (China)	Voided (3–1)	(South Korea) Gwangju FC
Qazaishvili 16'; Zeca 33'; Cryzan 45+1'	Report	Lee Min-ki 35'

Jinan Olympic Sports Center Stadium, Jinan
Attendance: 32,867
Referee: Mohammed Al Hoaish (Saudi Arabia)

12 February 2025
19:00 UTC+9

Yokohama F. Marinos (Japan)	1–0	(China) Shanghai Shenhua
Matheus 20'	Report

Nissan Stadium, Yokohama
Attendance: 11,626
Referee: Mooud Bonyadifard (Iran)

12 February 2025
19:00 UTC+7

Buriram United (Thailand)	2–1	(South Korea) Ulsan HD
Bissoli 20'; Mueanta 90+3'	Report	Jang Si-young 45+1'

Buriram Stadium, Buriram
Attendance: 16,068
Referee: Alireza Faghani (Australia)

===== Matchday 8 =====
18 February 2025
19:00 UTC+9

Gwangju FC (South Korea)	2–2	(Thailand) Buriram United
Oh Hu-seong 68', 74'	Report	Bissoli 13'; Boakye 35'

Gwangju World Cup Stadium, Gwangju
Attendance: 2,688
Referee: Salman Ahmad Falahi (Qatar)

18 February 2025
19:00 UTC+9

Kawasaki Frontale (Japan)	2–0	(Australia) Central Coast Mariners
Erison 36' (pen.); Marcinho 90+8'	Report

Kawasaki Todoroki Stadium, Kawasaki
Attendance: 11,013
Referee: Sivakorn Pu-udom (Thailand)

18 February 2025
20:00 UTC+8

Shanghai Shenhua (China)	4–2	(Japan) Vissel Kobe
Saulo 2', 48', 70' (pen.); Chan 45+3'	Report	Tominaga 87'; Ide 90+3'

Shanghai Stadium, Shanghai
Attendance: 20,972
Referee: Majed Al-Shamrani (Saudi Arabia)

18 February 2025
20:00 UTC+8

Johor Darul Ta'zim (Malaysia)	5–2	(South Korea) Pohang Steelers
Arribas 37'; Bérgson 52'; Arif Aiman 56'; Jesé 90+7'; Jorge Obregón 90+15' (pen.)	Report	Lee Ho-jae 27'; Kang Hyeon-je 80'

Sultan Ibrahim Stadium, Johor Bahru
Attendance: 34,590
Referee: Adham Makhadmeh (Jordan)

19 February 2025
19:00 UTC+9

Ulsan HD (South Korea)	Cancelled (Note: The match was cancelled when Shandong Taishan did not report for the match.)	(China) Shandong Taishan

Ulsan Munsu Football Stadium, Ulsan

19 February 2025
20:00 UTC+8

Shanghai Port (China)	0–2	(Japan) Yokohama F. Marinos
	Report	Uenaka 64'; Amano 69'

Pudong Football Stadium, Shanghai
Attendance: 12,398
Referee: Hanna Hattab (Syria)
