= 2024–25 AFC Champions League Elite knockout stage =

Asia premier club football tournament

The 2024–25 AFC Champions League Elite knockout stage began on 3 March with the round of 16 and ended on 3 May 2025, with the final that decided the champions of the 2024–25 AFC Champions League Elite, Al Ahli. A total of 16 teams competed in the knockout stage.

The tournament winners qualified for the 2029 FIFA Club World Cup and 2025 FIFA Intercontinental Cup. Additionally, the winners entered the league stage of the 2025–26 AFC Champions League Elite, if they had not already qualified through their domestic performance.

== Qualified teams ==
The top eight teams in the league stage from each region advanced to the round of 16, with eight teams each from West Region and East Region.

West Region
Pos.	Team
1	(Saudi Arabia) Al-Hilal
2	(Saudi Arabia) Al-Ahli
3	(Saudi Arabia) Al-Nassr
4	(Qatar) Al-Sadd
5	(United Arab Emirates) Al-Wasl
6	(Iran) Esteghlal
7	(Qatar) Al-Rayyan
8	(Uzbekistan) Pakhtakor

East Region
Pos.	Team
1	(Japan) Yokohama F. Marinos
2	(Japan) Kawasaki Frontale
3	(Malaysia) Johor Darul Ta'zim
4	(South Korea) Gwangju FC
5	(Japan) Vissel Kobe
6	(Thailand) Buriram United
7	(China) Shanghai Shenhua
8	(China) Shanghai Port

== Format ==
In the knockout stage, the 16 teams played a single-elimination tournament. The round of 16 saw each team play against a team from the same region on a home-and-away two-legged basis. All ties afterwards were played as a single match, with cross-regional pairings in the quarter-finals. Extra time and a penalty shoot-out were used to decide the winner if necessary (Regulations Article 10). The match-ups for the quarter-finals, semi-finals, and final were determined at a single draw event.

== Schedule ==
The schedule of the knockout component was as follows.

Stage	Round	Draw date	West Region	East Region
Round of 16		No draw (Note: Pre-determined format)	3–4 and 10–11 March 2025	4–5 and 11–12 March 2025
Finals (Note: Single-leg ties, all played in Jeddah, Saudi Arabia)	Quarter-finals	17 March 2025	25–27 April 2025	
Finals	Semi-finals	17 March 2025	29–30 April 2025	
Finals	Final	17 March 2025	3 May 2025	

== Bracket ==
Round of 16
W8	(Uzbekistan) Pakhtakor	1	0	1
W1	(Saudi Arabia) Al-Hilal	0	4	4
E5	(Japan) Vissel Kobe	2	0	2
E4	(South Korea) Gwangju FC (a.e.t.)	0	3	3
W7	(Qatar) Al-Rayyan	1	0	1
W2	(Saudi Arabia) Al-Ahli	3	2	5
E6	(Thailand) Buriram United	0	1	1
E3	(Malaysia) Johor Darul Ta'zim	0	0	0
E8	(China) Shanghai Port	0	1	1
E1	(Japan) Yokohama F. Marinos	1	4	5
W6	(Iran) Esteghlal	0	0	0
W3	(Saudi Arabia) Al-Nassr	0	3	3
E7	(China) Shanghai Shenhua	1	0	1
E2	(Japan) Kawasaki Frontale	0	4	4
W5	(United Arab Emirates) Al-Wasl	1	1	2
W4	(Qatar) Al-Sadd	1	3	4

Quarter-finals
25 April – Jeddah
W1	(Saudi Arabia) Al-Hilal	7
E4	(South Korea) Gwangju FC	0
26 April – Jeddah
W2	(Saudi Arabia) Al-Ahli	3
E6	(Thailand) Buriram United	0
26 April – Jeddah
E1	(Japan) Yokohama F. Marinos	1
W3	(Saudi Arabia) Al-Nassr	4
27 April – Jeddah
E2	(Japan) Kawasaki Frontale (a.e.t.)	3
W4	(Qatar) Al-Sadd	2

Semi-finals
29 April – Jeddah
W1	(Saudi Arabia) Al-Hilal	1
W2	(Saudi Arabia) Al-Ahli	3
30 April – Jeddah
W3	(Saudi Arabia) Al-Nassr	2
E2	(Japan) Kawasaki Frontale	3

Final
3 May – Jeddah
W2	(Saudi Arabia) Al-Ahli	2
E2	(Japan) Kawasaki Frontale	0

== Round of 16 ==
=== Summary ===
The first legs were played on 3–5 March, and the second legs were played on 10–12 March 2025.

Team 1	Agg.	Team 2	1st leg	2nd leg
West Region
Pakhtakor (Uzbekistan)	1–4	(Saudi Arabia) Al-Hilal	1–0	0–4
Al-Rayyan (Qatar)	1–5	(Saudi Arabia) Al-Ahli	1–3	0–2
Esteghlal (Iran)	0–3	(Saudi Arabia) Al-Nassr	0–0	0–3
Al-Wasl (United Arab Emirates)	2–4	(Qatar) Al-Sadd	1–1	1–3
East Region
Shanghai Port (China)	1–5	(Japan) Yokohama FM	0–1	1–4
Shanghai Shenhua (China)	1–4	(Japan) Kawasaki Frontale	1–0	0–4
Buriram United (Thailand)	1–0	(Malaysia) Johor Darul Ta'zim	0–0	1–0
Vissel Kobe (Japan)	2–3	(South Korea) Gwangju FC	2–0	0–3 (a.e.t.)

==== West Region ====
4 March 2025
21:00 UTC+5

Pakhtakor (Uzbekistan)	1–0	(Saudi Arabia) Al-Hilal
Flamarion 29'	Report

JAR Stadium, Tashkent (Note: Pakhtakor played their home matches at JAR Stadium, Tashkent, instead of their regular home stadium Pakhtakor Central Stadium, Tashkent.)
Attendance: 5,226
Referee: Ma Ning (China)
11 March 2025
23:00 UTC+3

Al-Hilal (Saudi Arabia)	4–0(4-1 AGG)	(Uzbekistan) Pakhtakor
Al-Yami 30'; Malcom 42'; N. Al-Dawsari 51' (pen.); S. Al-Dawsari 90+2'	Report

Kingdom Arena, Riyadh
Attendance: 24,316
Referee: Adham Makhadmeh (Jordan)

Al-Hilal won 4–1 on aggregate.

4 March 2025
21:00 UTC+3

Al-Rayyan (Qatar)	1–3	(Saudi Arabia) Al-Ahli
Guedes 71'	Report	Galeno 30'; Mahrez 34'; Al-Buraikan 90+5'

Ahmad bin Ali Stadium, Al Rayyan
Attendance: 8,836
Referee: Yusuke Araki (Japan)
11 March 2025
23:00 UTC+3

Al-Ahli (Saudi Arabia)	2–0(5-1 AGG)	(Qatar) Al-Rayyan
Mahrez 77', 83'	Report

King Abdullah Sports City Stadium, Jeddah
Attendance: 44,916
Referee: Shaun Evans (Australia)

Al-Ahli won 5–1 on aggregate.

3 March 2025
19:30 UTC+3:30

Esteghlal (Iran)	0–0	(Saudi Arabia) Al-Nassr
	Report

Azadi Stadium, Tehran
Attendance: 75,130
Referee: Ahmed Al-Kaf (Oman)
10 March 2025
21:00 UTC+3

Al-Nassr (Saudi Arabia)	3–0(3-0 AGG)	(Iran) Esteghlal
Durán 9', 84'; Ronaldo 27' (pen.)	Report

Al-Awwal Park, Riyadh
Attendance: 23,256
Referee: Ilgiz Tantashev (Uzbekistan)

Al-Nassr won 3–0 on aggregate.

3 March 2025
22:00 UTC+4

Al-Wasl (United Arab Emirates)	1–1	(Qatar) Al-Sadd
Saleh 3'	Report	Al-Yazidi 68'

Zabeel Stadium, Dubai
Attendance: 3,188
Referee: Nazmi Nasaruddin (Malaysia)
10 March 2025
21:00 UTC+3

Al-Sadd (Qatar)	3–1(4-2 AGG)	(United Arab Emirates) Al-Wasl
Meshaal 26'; Atal 30'; Afif 37'	Report	Lima 10'

Jassim bin Hamad Stadium, Al Rayyan
Attendance: 8,693
Referee: Majed Al-Shamrani (Saudi Arabia)

Al-Sadd won 4–2 on aggregate.

==== East Region ====
4 March 2025
20:00 UTC+8

Shanghai Port (China)	0–1	(Japan) Yokohama F. Marinos
	Report	Anderson Lopes 30'

Pudong Football Stadium, Shanghai
Attendance: 10,860
Referee: Kim Jong-hyeok (South Korea)
11 March 2025
19:00 UTC+9

Yokohama F. Marinos (Japan)	4–1	(China) Shanghai Port
Tono 2'; Anderson Lopes 29', 56'; Yan 44'	Report	Leonardo 35'

Nissan Stadium, Yokohama
Attendance: 9,482
Referee: Khalid Al-Turais (Saudi Arabia)

Yokohama F. Marinos won 5–1 on aggregate.

5 March 2025
20:00 UTC+8

Shanghai Shenhua (China)	1–0	(Japan) Kawasaki Frontale
Takai 76' (o.g.)	Report

Shanghai Stadium, Shanghai
Attendance: 20,837
Referee: Salman Falahi (Qatar)
12 March 2025
19:00 UTC+9

Kawasaki Frontale (Japan)	4–0	(China) Shanghai Shenhua
Sasaki 24'; Erison 64'; Ito 68'; Marcinho 90+1'	Report

Kawasaki Todoroki Stadium, Kawasaki
Attendance: 13,277
Referee: Omar Al-Ali (United Arab Emirates)

Kawasaki Frontale won 4–1 on aggregate.

4 March 2025
21:00 UTC+7

Buriram United (Thailand)	0–0	(Malaysia) Johor Darul Ta'zim
	Report

Buriram Stadium, Buriram
Attendance: 22,207
Referee: Mohammed Al-Hoaish (Saudi Arabia)
11 March 2025
20:00 UTC+8

Johor Darul Ta'zim (Malaysia)	0–1	(Thailand) Buriram United
	Report	Suphanat 58'

Sultan Ibrahim Stadium, Johor Bahru
Attendance: 34,644
Referee: Ahmed Al-Ali (Kuwait)

Buriram United won 1–0 on aggregate.

5 March 2025
19:00 UTC+9

Vissel Kobe (Japan)	2–0	(South Korea) Gwangju FC
Osako 20'; Ide 29'	Report

Kobe City Misaki Park Stadium, Kobe
Attendance: 7,630
Referee: Adel Al-Naqbi (United Arab Emirates)
12 March 2025
19:00 UTC+9

Gwangju (South Korea)	3–0 (a.e.t.)	(Japan) Vissel Kobe
Park Jeong-in 18'; Asani 85' (pen.), 118'	Report

Gwangju World Cup Stadium, Gwangju
Attendance: 3,617
Referee: Abdulrahman Al-Jassim (Qatar)

Gwangju won 3–2 on aggregate.

== Finals ==
The four winners from West Region and the four winners from East Region in the round of 16 advanced to the quarter-finals. The quarter-finals, semi-finals, and final were held in Jeddah, Saudi Arabia from 25 April to 3 May 2025.

The draw for the quarter-finals was held on 17 March 2025. Each quarter-final featured a team from the West Region against a team from the East Region. Based on the league stage results, the two highest-ranked teams overall (i.e., all first-placed teams in each region are ranked above all second-placed teams, etc.) Al-Hilal and Yokohama F. Marinos were allocated positions on opposite sides of the tournament bracket, with the draw determining the positions of the other six teams. The team with the highest overall ranking (Note: If the rank between the highest-seeded clubs overall by each region was equal, the club with the better overall result in the league stage was the highest-ranked team.) played in the first quarter-final, while the team with the second-highest overall ranking played in the third quarter-final. The match pairings of the semi-finals and final were pre-determined.

Rank	Team	Grp	Pos	Pld	W	D	L	GF	GA	GD	Pts
1	(Saudi Arabia) Al-Hilal	W	1	8	7	1	0	26	7	+19	22
2	(Japan) Yokohama F. Marinos	E	1	7	6	0	1	21	7	+14	18
3	(Saudi Arabia) Al-Ahli	W	2	8	7	1	0	21	8	+13	22
4	(Japan) Kawasaki Frontale	E	2	7	5	0	2	13	4	+9	15
5	(Saudi Arabia) Al-Nassr	W	3	8	5	2	1	17	6	+11	17
6	(South Korea) Gwangju	E	3	7	4	2	1	15	9	+6	14
7	(Qatar) Al-Sadd	W	4	8	3	3	2	10	9	+1	12
8	(Thailand) Buriram United	E	4	8	3	3	2	7	12	−5	12

=== Venues ===
The matches were played in two stadiums in the city of Jeddah.

Location of the host city of the 2024–25 AFC Champions League Elite finals.	Jeddah	
Location of the host city of the 2024–25 AFC Champions League Elite finals.	King Abdullah; Sports City Stadium	Prince Abdullah; Al-Faisal Stadium
Location of the host city of the 2024–25 AFC Champions League Elite finals.	Capacity: 63,079	Capacity: 27,000

=== Matches ===
==== Quarter-finals ====
25 April 2025
19:30 UTC+3

Al-Hilal (Saudi Arabia)	7–0	(South Korea) Gwangju FC
Milinković-Savić 6'; Marcos Leonardo 25'; S. Al-Dawsari 33'; Mitrović 55'; Malcom 79'; N. Al-Dawsari 84'; Al-Hamdan 86'	Report

King Abdullah Sports City Stadium, Jeddah
Attendance: 48,713
Referee: Ahmed Al-Ali (Kuwait)

26 April 2025
19:30 UTC+3

Al-Ahli (Saudi Arabia)	3–0	(Thailand) Buriram United
Mahrez 4'; Galeno 6'; Firmino 30'	Report

King Abdullah Sports City Stadium, Jeddah
Attendance: 43,027
Referee: Ahmed Al-Kaf (Oman)

26 April 2025
22:30 UTC+3

Yokohama F. Marinos (Japan)	1–4	(Saudi Arabia) Al-Nassr
Watanabe 53'	Report	Durán 27', 49'; Mané 31'; Ronaldo 38'

Prince Abdullah Al-Faisal Sports City, Jeddah
Attendance: 12,003
Referee: Adel Al-Naqbi (United Arab Emirates)

27 April 2025
19:30 UTC+3

Kawasaki Frontale (Japan)	3–2 (a.e.t.)	(Qatar) Al-Sadd
Erison 4'; Marcinho 21'; Wakizaka 98'	Report	Otávio 9'; Claudinho 71'

Prince Abdullah Al-Faisal Sports City, Jeddah
Attendance: 2,873
Referee: Ma Ning (China)

==== Semi-finals ====
29 April 2025
19:30 UTC+3

Al-Hilal (Saudi Arabia)	1–3	(Saudi Arabia) Al-Ahli
S. Al-Dawsari 42'	Report	Firmino 9'; Toney 27'; Al-Buraikan 90+8'

King Abdullah Sports City Stadium, Jeddah
Attendance: 50,613
Referee: Adham Makhadmeh (Jordan)

30 April 2025
19:30 UTC+3

Al-Nassr (Saudi Arabia)	2–3	(Japan) Kawasaki Frontale
Mané 28'; Yahya 87'	Report	Itō 10'; Ozeki 41'; Ienaga 76'

King Abdullah Sports City Stadium, Jeddah
Attendance: 28,810
Referee: Alireza Faghani (Australia)

==== Final ====
3 May 2025
19:30 UTC+3

Al-Ahli (Saudi Arabia)	2–0	(Japan) Kawasaki Frontale
Galeno 35'; Kessié 42'	Report

King Abdullah Sports City Stadium, Jeddah
Attendance: 58,281
Referee: Abdulrahman Al-Jassim (Qatar)
