= 2025 AFC eChampions League Elite =

- Dates: 24–28 April 2025

The 2025 AFC eChampions League Elite was the 1st edition of Asia's premier club esports tournament, organised by the Asian Football Confederation (AFC).

== See also ==
- 2024–25 AFC Champions League Elite
