= 2024–25 AFC Champions League Elite =

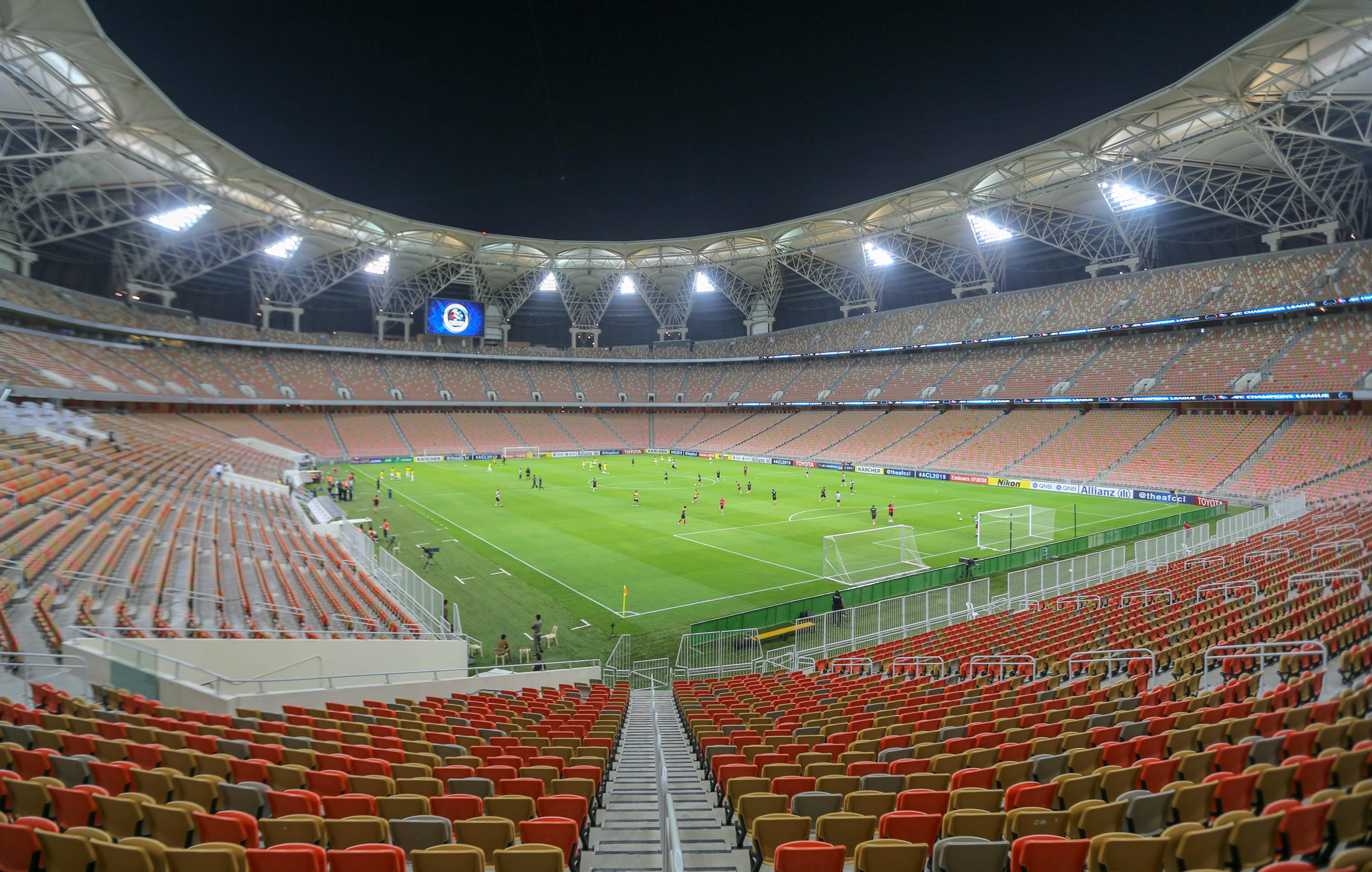
- The King Abdullah Sports City Stadium in Jeddah hosted the final

Tournament details
- Dates: Qualifying: 6–13 August 2024; Competition proper: 16 September 2024 – 3 May 2025
- Teams: Competition proper: 24 (from 12 associations)

Final positions
- Champions: (Saudi Arabia) Al-Ahli (1st title)
- Runners-up: (Japan) Kawasaki Frontale

Tournament statistics
- Matches played: 111
- Goals scored: 334 (3.01 per match)
- Attendance: 1,677,544 (15,113 per match)
- Top scorer(s): Salem Al-Dawsari (10 goals)
- Best player: Roberto Firmino
- Best goalkeeper: Édouard Mendy

The 2024–25 AFC Champions League Elite (ACL Elite) was the 43rd edition of Asia's premier club football tournament, organised by the Asian Football Confederation (AFC), and the first since it was rebranded as the AFC Champions League Elite. The revamped format, along with the rebranding, saw 24 teams playing eight games against different opponents in the brand new league phase.

The finals was played in Jeddah, Saudi Arabia from 25 April to 3 May 2025. The tournament winner, Al-Ahli, qualified for the 2025 FIFA Intercontinental Cup and the 2029 FIFA Club World Cup. Additionally, they entered the league stage of the 2025–26 AFC Champions League Elite, as they had not qualified through domestic performance.

Al-Ain were the defending champions, but were eliminated in the league stage.

== Association team allocation ==
The associations were allocated slots according to their club competitions ranking which was published after the 2022 competitions were completed.

Participation for 2024–25 AFC Champions League Elite
Participating
Not participating

West Region (12 teams)
Rank		Member association	Points	Slots	
Rank		Member association	Points	League stage	Play-off
Region	AFC	Member association	Points	League stage	Play-off
1	1	Saudi Arabia	93.795	3	0
2	4	Qatar	75.950	2	1
3	5	Iran	72.018	2	1
4	6	United Arab Emirates	64.129	1 (+1 ACL)	1
5	9	Uzbekistan	45.006	1	0
6	10	Iraq	36.901	1	0
Total		Participating associations: 6		11	3
Total		Participating associations: 6		14	

East Region (12 teams)
Rank		Member association	Points	Slots	
Rank		Member association	Points	League stage	Play-off
Region	AFC	Member association	Points	League stage	Play-off
1	2	Japan	91.821	3	0
2	3	South Korea	88.925	3	0
3	7	China	57.630	2	1
4	8	Thailand	49.470	1	1
5	11	Australia	33.380	1	0
6	13	Malaysia	29.951	1	0
Total		Participating associations: 6		11	2
Total		Participating associations: 6		13	

== Teams ==
In the following table, the number of appearances and last appearance count since the 2002–03 season, when the competition was rebranded as the AFC Champions League.

Entry round	West Region			East Region		
League stage	Team	Qualifying method	App. (last)	Team	Qualifying method	App. (last)
League stage	(United Arab Emirates) Al-Ain	2023–24 AFC Champions League winners	18th (2023–24)	(Japan) Vissel Kobe	2023 J1 League champions	3rd (2022)
League stage	(Saudi Arabia) Al-Hilal	2023–24 Saudi Pro League champions 2023–24 King's Cup winners	20th (2023–24)	(Japan) Kawasaki Frontale	2023 Emperor's Cup winners	11th (2023–24)
League stage	(Saudi Arabia) Al-Nassr	2023–24 Saudi Pro League runners-up	8th (2023–24)	(Japan) Yokohama F. Marinos	2023 J1 League runners-up	7th (2023–24)
League stage	(Saudi Arabia) Al-Ahli	2023–24 Saudi Pro League third place	14th (2021)	(South Korea) Ulsan HD	2023 K League 1 champions	12th (2023–24)
League stage	(Qatar) Al-Sadd	2023–24 Qatar Stars League champions 2024 Emir of Qatar Cup winners	19th (2023–24)	(South Korea) Pohang Steelers	2023 Korean FA Cup winners	10th (2023–24)
League stage	(Qatar) Al-Rayyan	2023–24 Qatar Stars League runners-up	13th (2022)	(South Korea) Gwangju FC	2023 K League 1 third place	1st
League stage	(Iran) Persepolis	2023–24 Persian Gulf Pro League champions	12th (2023–24)	(China) Shanghai Port	2023 Chinese Super League champions	8th (2023–24)
League stage	(Iran) Esteghlal	2023–24 Persian Gulf Pro League runners-up	12th (2021)	(China) Shanghai Shenhua	2023 Chinese FA Cup winners	10th (2020)
League stage	(United Arab Emirates) Al-Wasl	2023–24 UAE Pro League champions 2023–24 UAE President's Cup winners	4th (2019)	(Thailand) Buriram United	2023–24 Thai League 1 champions	12th (2023–24)
League stage	(Uzbekistan) Pakhtakor	2023 Uzbekistan Super League champions	20th (2023–24)	(Australia) Central Coast Mariners	2023–24 A-League Men regular season premiers 2023–24 AFC Cup winners	6th (2015)
League stage	(Iraq) Al-Shorta	2023–24 Iraq Stars League champions	6th (2021)	(Malaysia) Johor Darul Ta'zim	2023 Malaysia Super League champions	10th (2023–24)
Play-off round	(Qatar) Al-Gharafa	2023–24 Qatar Stars League third place	13th (2022)	(China) Shandong Taishan	2023 Chinese Super League runners-up	12th (2023–24)
Play-off round				(Thailand) Bangkok United	2023–24 Thai FA Cup winners	5th (2023–24)
Preliminary round	(Iran) Sepahan	2023–24 Hazfi Cup winners	15th (2023–24)			
Preliminary round	(United Arab Emirates) Shabab Al-Ahli	2023–24 UAE Pro League runners-up	12th (2023–24)			

Notes

1. China (CHN): Considered to have withdrawn at the final match of the league stage.
2. Qatar (QAT): As 2024 Emir of Qatar Cup winners Al-Sadd qualified for the Champions League Elite via their league position, the spot reserved for the Emir of Qatar Cup winners was transferred to the third placed team in the 2023–24 Qatar Stars League.
3. South Korea (KOR): As 2023 Korean FA Cup winners Pohang Steelers qualified for the Champions League Elite via their league position, the spot reserved for the Korean FA Cup winners was transferred to the third placed team in the 2023 K League 1.
  As both East region finalists in the 2023–24 AFC Champions League and the 2023–24 AFC Cup (Yokohama F. Marinos and the Central Coast Mariners) qualified for the Champions League Elite through their domestic performance, Gwangju FC qualified directly into the League stage rather than the qualifying play-off.
4. Saudi Arabia (KSA): As 2023–24 King's Cup winners Al-Hilal qualified for the Champions League Elite via their league position, the spot reserved for the King's Cup winners was transferred to the third placed team of the 2023–24 Saudi Pro League.
5. United Arab Emirates (UAE): As 2023–24 UAE President's Cup winners Al Wasl qualified for the Champions League Elite via their league position, the spot reserved for the UAE President's Cup winners was transferred to the runners-up of the 2023–24 UAE Pro League.

== Schedule ==
The schedule of the competition was as follows. All matches were played on Mondays, Tuesdays and Wednesdays, apart from the quarter-finals and final. The quarter-finals, semi-finals and final were played at a centralised venue in Jeddah.

Stage	Round	Draw date	West region	East region
Preliminary stage	Preliminary round 1	No draw (Note: Pre-determined format)	6 August 2024	
Preliminary stage	Preliminary round 2	No draw	13 August 2024	
League stage	Matchday 1	16 August 2024	16–17 September 2024	17–18 September 2024
League stage	Matchday 2	16 August 2024	30 September–1 October 2024	1–2 October 2024
League stage	Matchday 3	16 August 2024	21–22 October 2024	22–23 October 2024
League stage	Matchday 4	16 August 2024	4–5 November 2024	5–6 November 2024
League stage	Matchday 5	16 August 2024	25–26 November 2024	26–27 November 2024
League stage	Matchday 6	16 August 2024	2–3 December 2024	3–4 December 2024
League stage	Matchday 7	16 August 2024	3–4 February 2025	11–12 February 2025
League stage	Matchday 8	16 August 2024	17–18 February 2025	18–19 February 2025
Round of 16 (Note: Two-legged ties)		No draw	3–4 and 10–11 March 2025	4–5 and 11–12 March 2025
Finals (Note: Single leg ties)	Quarter-finals	17 March 2025	25–27 April 2025	
Finals	Semi-finals	17 March 2025	29–30 April 2025	
Finals	Final	17 March 2025	3 May 2025 at King Abdullah Sports City, Jeddah	

== Qualifying play-offs ==
The two winners of the play-off round (one from West Region and one from East Region) advanced to the league stage to join the 22 direct entrants. The losers of the qualifying play-offs entered the group stage of the 2024–25 AFC Champions League Two.

=== Preliminary round ===
A total of 2 teams played in the preliminary round.

West Region
Team 1	Score	Team 2
Sepahan (Iran)	1–4 (a.e.t.)	(United Arab Emirates) Shabab Al-Ahli

=== Play-off round ===
A total of 4 teams played in the play-off round: 3 teams which entered in this round, and 1 winners of the preliminary round.

Team 1	Score	Team 2
West Region
Al-Gharafa SC (Qatar)	1–0	(United Arab Emirates) Shabab Al-Ahli
East Region
Shandong Taishan (China)	1–1 (a.e.t.) (4–3 p)	(Thailand) Bangkok United

== League stage ==
Location of the 2024–25 AFC Champions League Elite league stage teams
Orange: East Region; Blue: West Region

=== West Region ===
Table

Pos	Team	Pld	W	D	L	GF	GA	GD	Pts	Qualification
1	(Saudi Arabia) Al-Hilal	8	7	1	0	26	7	+19	22	Advance to round of 16
2	(Saudi Arabia) Al-Ahli	8	7	1	0	21	8	+13	22	Advance to round of 16
3	(Saudi Arabia) Al-Nassr	8	5	2	1	17	6	+11	17	Advance to round of 16
4	(Qatar) Al-Sadd	8	3	3	2	10	9	+1	12	Advance to round of 16
5	(United Arab Emirates) Al Wasl	8	3	2	3	8	12	−4	11	Advance to round of 16
6	(Iran) Esteghlal	8	2	3	3	8	9	−1	9	Advance to round of 16
7	(Qatar) Al-Rayyan	8	2	2	4	8	12	−4	8	Advance to round of 16
8	(Uzbekistan) Pakhtakor	8	1	4	3	4	6	−2	7	Advance to round of 16
9	(Iran) Persepolis	8	1	4	3	6	10	−4	7	
10	(Qatar) Al-Gharafa	8	2	1	5	10	18	−8	7	
11	(Iraq) Al-Shorta	8	1	3	4	7	17	−10	6	
12	(United Arab Emirates) Al Ain	8	0	2	6	11	22	−11	2	

Source: Asian Football Confederation
Rules for classification: 1) points; 2) goal difference; 3) number of goals scored; 4) number of matches won; 5) penalty shoot-out if only two teams remain tied and played each other on the final matchday 6) fair play ranking; 7) drawing of lots

Results

Matchday 1
Home team	Score	Away team
Al Ain (United Arab Emirates)	1–1	(Qatar) Al-Sadd
Al-Shorta (Iraq)	1–1	(Saudi Arabia) Al-Nassr
Esteghlal (Iran)	3–0	(Qatar) Al-Gharafa
Al-Ahli (Saudi Arabia)	1–0	(Iran) Persepolis
Pakhtakor (Uzbekistan)	0–1	(United Arab Emirates) Al Wasl
Al-Rayyan (Qatar)	1–3	(Saudi Arabia) Al-Hilal

Matchday 2
Home team	Score	Away team
Al-Sadd (Qatar)	2–0	(Iran) Esteghlal
Persepolis (Iran)	1–1	(Uzbekistan) Pakhtakor
Al Wasl (United Arab Emirates)	0–2	(Saudi Arabia) Al-Ahli
Al-Nassr (Saudi Arabia)	2–1	(Qatar) Al-Rayyan
Al-Gharafa (Qatar)	4–2	(United Arab Emirates) Al Ain
Al-Hilal (Saudi Arabia)	5–0	(Iraq) Al-Shorta

Matchday 3
Home team	Score	Away team
Al-Shorta (Iraq)	0–0	(Uzbekistan) Pakhtakor
Al-Sadd (Qatar)	1–0	(Iran) Persepolis
Al Ain (United Arab Emirates)	4–5	(Saudi Arabia) Al-Hilal
Al-Rayyan (Qatar)	1–2	(Saudi Arabia) Al-Ahli
Esteghlal (Iran)	0–1	(Saudi Arabia) Al-Nassr
Al-Gharafa (Qatar)	1–2	(United Arab Emirates) Al Wasl

Matchday 4
Home team	Score	Away team
Al Wasl (United Arab Emirates)	1–1	(Qatar) Al-Sadd
Al-Ahli (Saudi Arabia)	5–1	(Iraq) Al-Shorta
Persepolis (Iran)	1–1	(Qatar) Al-Gharafa
Al-Hilal (Saudi Arabia)	3–0	(Iran) Esteghlal
Pakhtakor (Uzbekistan)	0–1	(Qatar) Al-Rayyan
Al-Nassr (Saudi Arabia)	5–1	(United Arab Emirates) Al Ain

Matchday 5
Home team	Score	Away team
Al Ain (United Arab Emirates)	1–2	(Saudi Arabia) Al-Ahli
Esteghlal (Iran)	0–0	(Uzbekistan) Pakhtakor
Al-Gharafa (Qatar)	1–3	(Saudi Arabia) Al-Nassr
Al-Rayyan (Qatar)	1–1	(Iran) Persepolis
Al-Shorta (Iraq)	1–3	(United Arab Emirates) Al Wasl
Al-Sadd (Qatar)	1–1	(Saudi Arabia) Al-Hilal

Matchday 6
Home team	Score	Away team
Persepolis (Iran)	2–1	(Iraq) Al-Shorta
Al-Ahli (Saudi Arabia)	2–2	(Iran) Esteghlal
Al Wasl (United Arab Emirates)	1–1	(Qatar) Al-Rayyan
Al-Nassr (Saudi Arabia)	1–2	(Qatar) Al-Sadd
Pakhtakor (Uzbekistan)	1–1	(United Arab Emirates) Al Ain
Al-Hilal (Saudi Arabia)	3–0	(Qatar) Al-Gharafa

Matchday 7
Home team	Score	Away team
Al Ain (United Arab Emirates)	1–2	(Qatar) Al-Rayyan
Esteghlal (Iran)	1–1	(Iraq) Al-Shorta
Al-Sadd (Qatar)	1–3	(Saudi Arabia) Al-Ahli
Al-Nassr (Saudi Arabia)	4–0	(United Arab Emirates) Al Wasl
Al-Gharafa (Qatar)	1–0	(Uzbekistan) Pakhtakor
Al-Hilal (Saudi Arabia)	4–1	(Iran) Persepolis

Matchday 8
Home team	Score	Away team
Pakhtakor (Uzbekistan)	2–1	(Qatar) Al-Sadd
Al-Shorta (Iraq)	2–0	(United Arab Emirates) Al Ain
Persepolis (Iran)	0–0	(Saudi Arabia) Al-Nassr
Al-Ahli (Saudi Arabia)	4–2	(Qatar) Al-Gharafa
Al-Rayyan (Qatar)	0–2	(Iran) Esteghlal
Al Wasl (United Arab Emirates)	0–2	(Saudi Arabia) Al-Hilal

=== East Region ===
Table

Pos	Team	Pld	W	D	L	GF	GA	GD	Pts	Qualification
1	(Japan) Yokohama F. Marinos	7	6	0	1	21	7	+14	18	Advance to round of 16
2	(Japan) Kawasaki Frontale	7	5	0	2	13	4	+9	15	Advance to round of 16
3	(Malaysia) Johor Darul Ta'zim	7	4	2	1	16	8	+8	14	Advance to round of 16
4	(South Korea) Gwangju	7	4	2	1	15	9	+6	14	Advance to round of 16
5	(Japan) Vissel Kobe	7	4	1	2	14	9	+5	13	Advance to round of 16
6	(Thailand) Buriram United	8	3	3	2	7	12	−5	12	Advance to round of 16
7	(China) Shanghai Shenhua	8	3	1	4	13	12	+1	10	Advance to round of 16
8	(China) Shanghai Port	8	2	2	4	10	18	−8	8	Advance to round of 16
9	(South Korea) Pohang Steelers	7	2	0	5	9	17	−8	6	
10	(South Korea) Ulsan HD	7	1	0	6	4	16	−12	3	
11	(Australia) Central Coast Mariners	7	0	1	6	8	18	−10	1	
12	(China) Shandong Taishan	0	0	0	0	0	0	0	0	Withdrawn, record expunged (Note: Shandong Taishan were considered to have withdrawn from the AFC Champions League Elite after the club confirmed that it did not intend to report for their league stage match against Ulsan HD on 19 February 2025. Their remaining fixture was cancelled, with their seven played matches being expunged.)

Source: Asian Football Confederation
Rules for classification: 1) points; 2) goal difference; 3) number of goals scored; 4) number of matches won; 5) penalty shoot-out if only two teams remain tied and played each other on the final matchday 6) fair play ranking; 7) drawing of lots
Notes:

Results

Matchday 1
Home team	Score	Away team
Gwangju FC (South Korea)	7–3	(Japan) Yokohama F. Marinos
Shandong Taishan (China)	~~3–1~~	(Australia) Central Coast Mariners
Buriram United (Thailand)	0–0	(Japan) Vissel Kobe
Shanghai Shenhua (China)	4–1	(South Korea) Pohang Steelers
Ulsan HD (South Korea)	0–1	(Japan) Kawasaki Frontale
Shanghai Port (China)	2–2	(Malaysia) Johor Darul Ta'zim

Matchday 2
Home team	Score	Away team
Central Coast Mariners (Australia)	1–2	(Thailand) Buriram United
Kawasaki Frontale (Japan)	0–1	(South Korea) Gwangju FC
Pohang Steelers (South Korea)	3–0	(China) Shanghai Port
Johor Darul Ta'zim (Malaysia)	3–0	(China) Shanghai Shenhua
Vissel Kobe (Japan)	~~2–1~~	(China) Shandong Taishan
Yokohama F. Marinos (Japan)	4–0	(South Korea) Ulsan HD

Matchday 3
Home team	Score	Away team
Gwangju FC (South Korea)	3–1	(Malaysia) Johor Darul Ta'zim
Shanghai Port (China)	3–2	(Australia) Central Coast Mariners
Shandong Taishan (China)	~~2–2~~	(Japan) Yokohama F. Marinos
Buriram United (Thailand)	1–0	(South Korea) Pohang Steelers
Ulsan HD (South Korea)	0–2	(Japan) Vissel Kobe
Shanghai Shenhua (China)	2–0	(Japan) Kawasaki Frontale

Matchday 4
Home team	Score	Away team
Central Coast Mariners (Australia)	2–2	(China) Shanghai Shenhua
Kawasaki Frontale (Japan)	3–1	(China) Shanghai Port
Vissel Kobe (Japan)	2–0	(South Korea) Gwangju FC
Johor Darul Ta'zim (Malaysia)	3–0	(South Korea) Ulsan HD
Pohang Steelers (South Korea)	~~4–2~~	(China) Shandong Taishan
Yokohama F. Marinos (Japan)	5–0	(Thailand) Buriram United

Matchday 5
Home team	Score	Away team
Vissel Kobe (Japan)	3–2	(Australia) Central Coast Mariners
Ulsan HD (South Korea)	1–3	(China) Shanghai Port
Shandong Taishan (China)	~~1–0~~	(Malaysia) Johor Darul Ta'zim
Buriram United (Thailand)	0–3	(Japan) Kawasaki Frontale
Gwangju FC (South Korea)	1–0	(China) Shanghai Shenhua
Yokohama F. Marinos (Japan)	2–0	(South Korea) Pohang Steelers

Matchday 6
Home team	Score	Away team
Central Coast Mariners (Australia)	0–4	(Japan) Yokohama F. Marinos
Pohang Steelers (South Korea)	3–1	(Japan) Vissel Kobe
Johor Darul Ta'zim (Malaysia)	0–0	(Thailand) Buriram United
Shanghai Port (China)	1–1	(South Korea) Gwangju FC
Kawasaki Frontale (Japan)	~~4–0~~	(China) Shandong Taishan
Shanghai Shenhua (China)	1–2	(South Korea) Ulsan HD

Matchday 7
Home team	Score	Away team
Central Coast Mariners (Australia)	1–2	(Malaysia) Johor Darul Ta'zim
Vissel Kobe (Japan)	4–0	(China) Shanghai Port
Pohang Steelers (South Korea)	0–4	(Japan) Kawasaki Frontale
Shandong Taishan (China)	~~3–1~~	(South Korea) Gwangju FC
Yokohama F. Marinos (Japan)	1–0	(China) Shanghai Shenhua
Buriram United (Thailand)	2–1	(South Korea) Ulsan HD

Matchday 8
Home team	Score	Away team
Gwangju FC (South Korea)	2–2	(Thailand) Buriram United
Kawasaki Frontale (Japan)	2–0	(Australia) Central Coast Mariners
Shanghai Shenhua (China)	4–2	(Japan) Vissel Kobe
Johor Darul Ta'zim (Malaysia)	5–2	(South Korea) Pohang Steelers
Ulsan HD (South Korea)	~~Canc.~~	(China) Shandong Taishan
Shanghai Port (China)	0–2	(Japan) Yokohama F. Marinos

== Knockout stage ==
=== Bracket ===
Round of 16
W8	(Uzbekistan) Pakhtakor	1	0	1
W1	(Saudi Arabia) Al-Hilal	0	4	4
E5	(Japan) Vissel Kobe	2	0	2
E4	(South Korea) Gwangju FC (a.e.t.)	0	3	3
W7	(Qatar) Al-Rayyan	1	0	1
W2	(Saudi Arabia) Al-Ahli	3	2	5
E6	(Thailand) Buriram United	0	1	1
E3	(Malaysia) Johor Darul Ta'zim	0	0	0
E8	(China) Shanghai Port	0	1	1
E1	(Japan) Yokohama F. Marinos	1	4	5
W6	(Iran) Esteghlal	0	0	0
W3	(Saudi Arabia) Al-Nassr	0	3	3
E7	(China) Shanghai Shenhua	1	0	1
E2	(Japan) Kawasaki Frontale	0	4	4
W5	(United Arab Emirates) Al-Wasl	1	1	2
W4	(Qatar) Al-Sadd	1	3	4

Quarter-finals
25 April – Jeddah
W1	(Saudi Arabia) Al-Hilal	7
E4	(South Korea) Gwangju FC	0
26 April – Jeddah
W2	(Saudi Arabia) Al-Ahli	3
E6	(Thailand) Buriram United	0
26 April – Jeddah
E1	(Japan) Yokohama F. Marinos	1
W3	(Saudi Arabia) Al-Nassr	4
27 April – Jeddah
E2	(Japan) Kawasaki Frontale (a.e.t.)	3
W4	(Qatar) Al-Sadd	2

Semi-finals
29 April – Jeddah
W1	(Saudi Arabia) Al-Hilal	1
W2	(Saudi Arabia) Al-Ahli	3
30 April – Jeddah
W3	(Saudi Arabia) Al-Nassr	2
E2	(Japan) Kawasaki Frontale	3

Final
3 May – Jeddah
W2	(Saudi Arabia) Al-Ahli	2
E2	(Japan) Kawasaki Frontale	0

=== Round of 16 ===
A total of 16 teams qualified for the knockout stage, with eight teams in each region. The first legs were played on 3–5 March, and the second legs were played on 10–12 March 2025.

Team 1	Agg.	Team 2	1st leg	2nd leg
West Region
Pakhtakor (Uzbekistan)	1–4	(Saudi Arabia) Al-Hilal	1–0	0–4
Al-Rayyan (Qatar)	1–5	(Saudi Arabia) Al-Ahli	1–3	0–2
Esteghlal (Iran)	0–3	(Saudi Arabia) Al-Nassr	0–0	0–3
Al-Wasl (United Arab Emirates)	2–4	(Qatar) Al-Sadd	1–1	1–3
East Region
Shanghai Port (China)	1–5	(Japan) Yokohama FM	0–1	1–4
Shanghai Shenhua (China)	1–4	(Japan) Kawasaki Frontale	1–0	0–4
Buriram United (Thailand)	1–0	(Malaysia) Johor Darul Ta'zim	0–0	1–0
Vissel Kobe (Japan)	2–3	(South Korea) Gwangju FC	2–0	0–3 (a.e.t.)

=== Finals ===
The quarter-finals, semi-finals and final, all as single-legged ties, were held in Jeddah, Saudi Arabia from 25 April to 3 May 2025.

==== Quarter-finals ====
25 April 2025
19:30 UTC+3

Al-Hilal (Saudi Arabia)	7–0	(South Korea) Gwangju FC
Milinković-Savić 6'; Marcos Leonardo 25'; S. Al-Dawsari 33'; Mitrović 55'; Malcom 79'; N. Al-Dawsari 84'; Al-Hamdan 86'	Report

King Abdullah Sports City Stadium, Jeddah
Attendance: 48,713
Referee: Ahmed Al-Ali (Kuwait)

26 April 2025
19:30 UTC+3

Al-Ahli (Saudi Arabia)	3–0	(Thailand) Buriram United
Mahrez 4'; Galeno 6'; Firmino 30'	Report

King Abdullah Sports City Stadium, Jeddah
Attendance: 43,027
Referee: Ahmed Al-Kaf (Oman)

26 April 2025
22:30 UTC+3

Yokohama F. Marinos (Japan)	1–4	(Saudi Arabia) Al-Nassr
Watanabe 53'	Report	Durán 27', 49'; Mané 31'; Ronaldo 38'

Prince Abdullah Al-Faisal Sports City, Jeddah
Attendance: 12,003
Referee: Adel Al-Naqbi (United Arab Emirates)

27 April 2025
19:30 UTC+3

Kawasaki Frontale (Japan)	3–2 (a.e.t.)	(Qatar) Al-Sadd
Erison 4'; Marcinho 21'; Wakizaka 98'	Report	Otávio 9'; Claudinho 71'

Prince Abdullah Al-Faisal Sports City, Jeddah
Attendance: 2,873
Referee: Ma Ning (China)

==== Semi-finals ====
29 April 2025
19:30 UTC+3

Al-Hilal (Saudi Arabia)	1–3	(Saudi Arabia) Al-Ahli
S. Al-Dawsari 42'	Report	Firmino 9'; Toney 27'; Al-Buraikan 90+8'

King Abdullah Sports City Stadium, Jeddah
Attendance: 50,613
Referee: Adham Makhadmeh (Jordan)

30 April 2025
19:30 UTC+3

Al-Nassr (Saudi Arabia)	2–3	(Japan) Kawasaki Frontale
Mané 28'; Yahya 87'	Report	Itō 10'; Ozeki 41'; Ienaga 76'

King Abdullah Sports City Stadium, Jeddah
Attendance: 28,810
Referee: Alireza Faghani (Australia)

==== Final ====
3 May 2025
19:30 UTC+3

Al-Ahli (Saudi Arabia)	2–0	(Japan) Kawasaki Frontale
Galeno 35'; Kessié 42'	Report

King Abdullah Sports City Stadium, Jeddah
Attendance: 58,281
Referee: Abdulrahman Al-Jassim (Qatar)

== Top scorers ==
Team eliminated for this round / Matches voided by AFC
Player was not in the team but the team was still active for this round.

Rank	Player	Team	MD1	MD2	MD3	MD4	MD5	MD6	MD7	MD8	R16-1	R16-2	QF	SF	F	Total
1	(Saudi Arabia) Salem Al-Dawsari	(Saudi Arabia) Al-Hilal		1	3				2	1		1	1	1		10
2	(Algeria) Riyad Mahrez	(Saudi Arabia) Al-Ahli		1		2			1	1	1	2	1			9
2	(Albania) Jasir Asani	(South Korea) Gwangju FC	3	1	2		1					2				9
4	(Portugal) Cristiano Ronaldo	(Saudi Arabia) Al-Nassr		1		1	2		2			1	1			8
4	(Brazil) Anderson Lopes	(Japan) Yokohama F. Marinos		1		2	1	1			1	2				8
6	(Serbia) Aleksandar Mitrović	(Saudi Arabia) Al-Hilal		1		3		1					1			6
6	(Brazil) Roberto Firmino	(Saudi Arabia) Al-Ahli				2			1	1			1			6
6	(England) Ivan Toney	(Saudi Arabia) Al-Ahli					2	2		1				1		6
9	(Qatar) Akram Afif	(Qatar) Al-Sadd	1	1				1	1			1				5
9	(Malaysia) Arif Aiman	(Malaysia) Johor Darul Ta'zim	2	1		1				1						5
9	(Argentina) Matías Vargas	(China) Shanghai Port			1	1	3									5

Note

- Goals scored in the qualifying play-offs and matches voided by AFC are not counted when determining top scorer (Regulations Article 64.4)

== See also ==
- 2024–25 AFC Champions League Two
- 2024–25 AFC Challenge League
- 2024–25 AFC Women's Champions League
- 2025 AFC eChampions League Elite (esports)
