= 2024–25 AFC Champions League Elite qualifying play-offs =

Asian Football Confederation play-offs

The 2024–25 AFC Champions League Elite qualifying play-offs was played from 6 to 13 August 2024. A total of 5 teams competing in the qualifying play-offs to decide two places in the league stage of the 2024–25 AFC Champions League Elite.

== Teams ==
The following 5 teams, split into two regions (West Region and East Region), entered the qualifying play-offs, consisting of two rounds:

- 2 teams entered in the preliminary round.
- 3 teams entered in the play-off round.

Region	Teams entering in preliminary round	Teams entering in play-off round
West Region	(Iran) Sepahan; (United Arab Emirates) Shabab Al-Ahli	(Qatar) Al-Gharafa
East Region		(China) Shandong Taishan; (Thailand) Bangkok United

== Format ==
In the qualifying play-offs, each tie was played as a single match. Extra time and penalty shoot-out were used to decide the winner if necessary.

== Schedule ==
The schedule of each round was as follows.

Round	Match date
Preliminary round	6 August 2024
Play-off round	13 August 2024

== Bracket ==
The bracket of the qualifying play-offs for each region was determined based on each team's association ranking, with the team from the higher-ranked association hosting the match. The two winners of the play-off round (one from West Region and one from East Region) advanced to the league stage to join the 22 direct entrants. The losers of the qualifying play-offs entered the group stage of the 2024–25 AFC Champions League Two.

=== Play-off West ===
Preliminary round
(Iran) Sepahan	1
(United Arab Emirates) Shabab Al-Ahli (a.e.t.)	4

Play-off round
(Qatar) Al-Gharafa	1
(United Arab Emirates) Shabab Al-Ahli	0

=== Play-off East ===
Play-off round
(China) Shandong Taishan (p)	1 (4)
(Thailand) Bangkok United	1 (3)

== Preliminary round ==
=== Summary ===
A total of 2 teams played in the preliminary round.

West Region
Team 1	Score	Team 2
Sepahan (Iran)	1–4 (a.e.t.)	(United Arab Emirates) Shabab Al-Ahli

6 August 2024
19:45 UTC+3:30

Sepahan (Iran)	1–4 (a.e.t.)	(United Arab Emirates) Shabab Al-Ahli
Mohebi 44'	Report	Azmoun 62'; Al-Ghassani 101', 120+2'; César 109'

Naghsh-e Jahan Stadium, Isfahan
Attendance: 52,123
Referee: Kim Jong-hyeok (South Korea)

== Play-off round ==
=== Summary ===
A total of 4 teams played in the play-off round: 3 teams which entered in this round, and 1 winners of the preliminary round.

Team 1	Score	Team 2
West Region
Al-Gharafa SC (Qatar)	1–0	(United Arab Emirates) Shabab Al-Ahli
East Region
Shandong Taishan (China)	1–1 (a.e.t.) (4–3 p)	(Thailand) Bangkok United

=== West Region ===
13 August 2024
18:30 UTC+3

Al-Gharafa (Qatar)	1–0	(United Arab Emirates) Shabab Al-Ahli
F. Sassi 50'	Report

Al Bayt Stadium, Al Khor
Attendance: 4,347
Referee: Sadullo Gulmurodi (Tajikistan)

=== East Region ===
13 August 2024
20:00 UTC+8

Shandong Taishan (China)	1–1 (a.e.t.)	(Thailand) Bangkok United
Qazaishvili 43'	Report	Živković 37'
Penalties
Zheng Zheng (penalty scored); Qazaishvili (penalty scored); Li Yuanyi (penalty missed); Zhang Chi (penalty scored); Scalese (penalty scored)	4–3	(penalty missed) Živković; (penalty scored) Rungrath; (penalty scored) Everton; (penalty scored) Al-Ghassani; (penalty missed) Thossawat

Jinan Olympic Sports Center Stadium, Jinan
Attendance: 20,766
Referee: Omar Mohamed Al-Ali (United Arab Emirates)
