= Khalid Al-Turais =

Saudi football referee (born 1987)

- Full name: Khalid Saleh Al-Turais
- Born: 30 April 1987 (age 39); Al-Qassim Province, Saudi Arabia

Domestic
Years	League	Role
2015–present	Saudi Pro League	Referee

International
Years	League	Role
2016–present	FIFA listed	Referee; Video assistant referee

Khalid Saleh Al-Turais (born 30 April 1987) is a Saudi Arabian football referee who has been listed on the FIFA International List of Referees since 2016 and as a video assistant referee since 2023.

== Career ==
Al-Turais was born in 1987 in Al-Qassim Province and began his refereeing career in Saudi Arabia in 2015 when he ascended to officiate games at the Saudi Pro League. He had previously taken part in the King's Cup. Al-Turais earned his FIFA badge in 2016 and began overseeing friendly matches as well as others inside the Asian Football Confederation (AFC), including the qualification for the FIFA World Cup.

In AFC tournaments, Al-Turais took part in the 2020 AFC Cup, and in September 2022, he refereed a playoff semifinal at that year's AFC Cup in a match between Mohun Bagan Super Giant and Kuala Lumpur City F.C. in Kolkata, India.

Al-Turais's other participations within AFC include the 2022 AFC U-23 Asian Cup and the 2023 AFC Asian Cup. At the international level, he was appointed for the 2023 FIFA U-17 World Cup as a video assistant referee and the 2025 FIFA U-20 World Cup as a pitch referee.

In April 2026, Al-Turais was selected to officiate as a central referee at the 2026 FIFA World Cup.
