= Prince Abdullah Al-Faisal Sports City Stadium =

Stadium in Jeddah, Saudi Arabia

Prince Abdullah Al-Faisal Sports City Stadium ملعب مدينة الأمير عبدالله الفيصل الرياضية
- Al-Faisal Stadium ملعب الفيصل
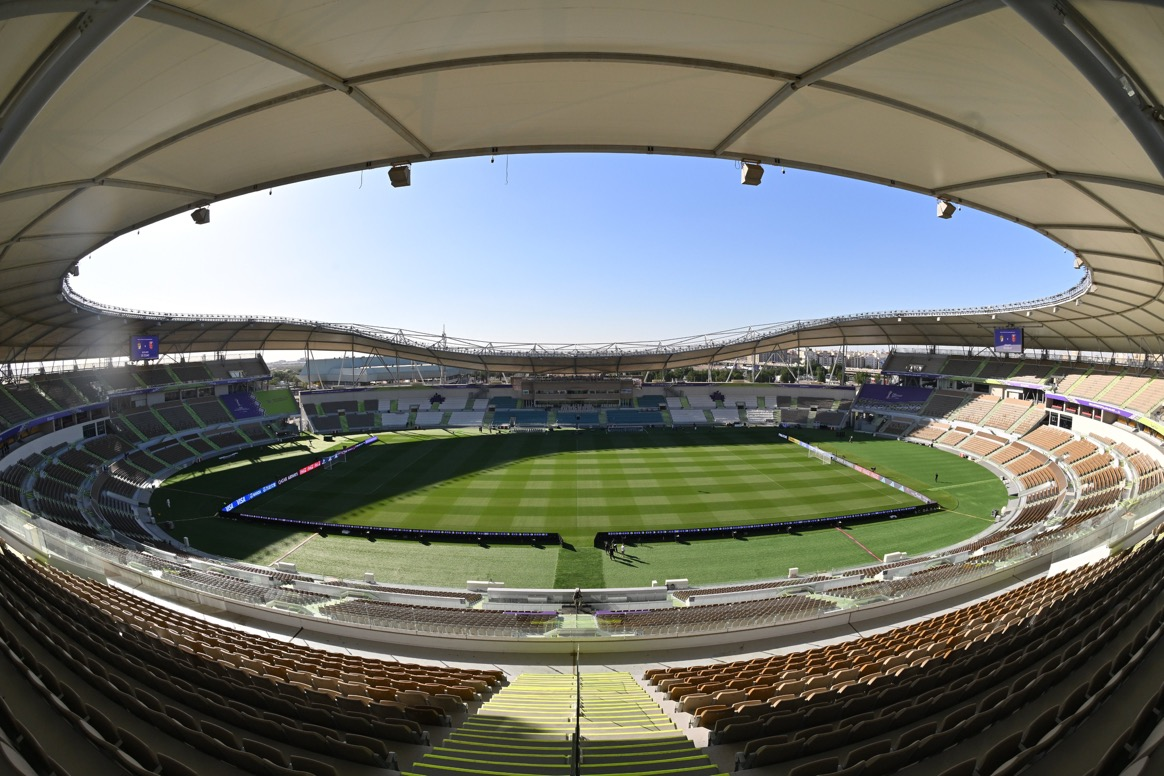
- The stadium in 2023
- Interactive map of Prince Abdullah Al-Faisal Sports City Stadium ملعب مدينة الأمير عبدالله الفيصل الرياضية
- Location: Jeddah, Saudi Arabia
- Coordinates: 21°26′48″N 39°15′06″E
- Owner: Ministry of Sport
- Operator: Ministry of Sport
- Capacity: 27,000

Construction
- Opened: 1970; 56 years ago
- Renovated: 2012–2022, 2023
- Expanded: 2021
- Cost: 90 million

Tenants
- Al-Ahli (1970–2012, 2021–present); Al-Ittihad (1970–2012, 2021–present); Jeddah Club (selected matches); Saudi Arabia national football team (selected matches): Major sporting events hosted; 2023 FIFA Club World Cup 2025 AFC Champions League Elite Finals Jeddah 2027 AFC Asian Cup (planned)

Prince Abdullah Al-Faisal Sports City Stadium known as Al-Faisal Stadium is a football stadium in the port city of Jeddah, Saudi Arabia.

== History ==
The stadium is located in the southeast of Jeddah, between King Abdulaziz University and the industrial city (Al Waziriah District). It is bound in the east by the Jeddah-Makkah expressway and in the south by Stadium Street.

The stadium was constructed in 1970 and has a capacity of around 27,000 spectators. It is also part of a municipal sports complex that includes an indoor arena and an aquatics center.

The stadium consists of two main stands. The covered west stand is fully seated and has an enclosed VIP box and media suites in a central tribune. The arch-shaped east stand is terraced and curves along the running track. A single large scoreboard is located on the northern edge of the east stand.

The stadium's capacity was reduced to 20,000 spectators by removing non-seating places in 2009.

Al-Ittihad and Al-Ahli both use the venue for home games.

In 2023, the stadium underwent significant refurbishments, including uniting the seat colors for a more cohesive aesthetic, installing modern gates to meet current standards, and covering the area around the pitch with artificial grass.

The stadium hosted two matches of the 2023 FIFA Club World Cup.

== See also ==
- List of football stadiums in Saudi Arabia
