= 2023 Vegalta Sendai season =

Vegalta Sendai
2023 season
- Chairman: Tomohiro Sasaki
- Manager: Akira Ito
- Stadium: Yurtec Stadium Sendai
- J2 League: 11th
- Emperor's Cup: Second round
- All statistics correct as of 18 May 2023.

The 2023 season was Vegalta Sendai's 35th season in existence and the club's second consecutive season in the second division of Japanese football. In addition to the domestic league, Vegalta Sendai participated in this season's edition of the Emperor's Cup.

== Players ==
=== First-team squad ===
As of 13 March 2023.

Note: Flags indicate national team as defined under FIFA eligibility rules; some limited exceptions apply. Players may hold more than one non-FIFA nationality.

| No. | Pos. | Nation | Player |
|---|---|---|---|
| 1 | GK | JPN | Yuma Obata |
| 2 | MF | JPN | Yosuke Akiyama |
| 3 | DF | JPN | Naoya Fukumori |
| 4 | DF | JPN | Koji Hachisuka |
| 5 | DF | JPN | Masashi Wakasa |
| 6 | MF | BRA | Ewerton (on loan from Portimonense) |
| 7 | FW | JPN | Motohiko Nakajima (on loan from Cerezo Osaka) |
| 8 | MF | JPN | Yoshiki Matsushita |
| 9 | FW | JPN | Masato Nakayama |
| 10 | MF | PRK | Ryang Yong-gi |
| 11 | MF | JPN | Yuta Goke |
| 13 | FW | JPN | Hiroto Yamada (on loan from Cerezo Osaka) |
| 14 | MF | JPN | Ryunosuke Sagara |
| 15 | DF | JPN | Masahiro Sugata |
| 16 | MF | JPN | Chihiro Kato |
| 18 | MF | JPN | Ryoma Kida |

| No. | Pos. | Nation | Player |
|---|---|---|---|
| 20 | DF | KOR | Kim Tae-hyeon (on loan from Ulsan Hyundai) |
| 21 | GK | JPN | Riku Umeda |
| 22 | DF | JPN | Yuta Koide |
| 25 | DF | JPN | Takumi Mase |
| 27 | MF | JPN | George Onaiwu |
| 28 | FW | JPN | Ryunosuke Sugawara |
| 29 | MF | JPN | Aoi Kudo |
| 32 | MF | JPN | Hiromu Kamada |
| 33 | GK | JPN | Akihiro Hayashi |
| 35 | MF | BRA | Foguinho |
| 41 | DF | JPN | Yuto Uchida |
| 45 | GK | JPN | Koki Matsuzawa (on loan from Tokushima Vortis) |
| 46 | MF | JPN | Rikuto Ishio ^{DSP} |
| 50 | MF | JPN | Yasushi Endo |
| 88 | FW | KOR | Heo Yong-joon (on loan from Pohang Steelers) |

== Transfers ==
Transfers in
| Join on | Pos. | Player | Moving from | Transfer type |
|---|---|---|---|---|
| 10 Mar | MF | (Japan) Rikuto Ishio | (Japan) Sendai University | Loan transfer; 2023 DSP |
| 9 Mar | GK | (Japan) Koki Matsuzawa | (Japan) Tokushima Vortis | Loan transfer |
| Pre-season | GK | (Japan) Akihiro Hayashi | (Japan) FC Tokyo | Full transfer |
| Pre-season | GK | (Japan) Riku Umeda | (Japan) Osaka Gakuin University | Free transfer |
| Pre-season | DF | (Japan) Yuta Koide | (Japan) Oita Trinita | Full transfer |
| Pre-season | DF | (Japan) Masahiro Sugata | (Japan) Roasso Kumamoto | Full transfer |
| Pre-season | MF | (Japan) Yuta Goke | (Japan) Vissel Kobe | Full transfer |
| Pre-season | MF | (Japan) Aoi Kudo | (Japan) Hannan University | Free transfer |
| Pre-season | MF | (Japan) Ryunosuke Sagara | (Japan) Sagan Tosu | Loan transfer |
| Pre-season | MF | (Japan) Yosuke Akiyama | (Japan) JEF United Chiba | Loan return |
| Pre-season | MF | (Brazil) Ewerton | (Portugal) Portimonense SC | Loan transfer |
| Pre-season | FW | (Japan) Hiroto Yamada | (Japan) Cerezo Osaka | Loan transfer |
| Pre-season | FW | (South Korea) Heo Yong-joon | (South Korea) Pohang Steelers | Loan transfer |
| Pre-season | FW | (Japan) George Onaiwu | (Japan) Niigata University UHW | Free transfer |
| Pre-season | FW | (Japan) Ryunosuke Sugawara | (Japan) Sanno University | Free transfer |

Transfers out
| Leave on | Pos. | Player | Moving to | Transfer type |
|---|---|---|---|---|
| 12 Mar | GK | (Japan) Daichi Sugimoto | (Japan) Nagoya Grampus | Full transfer |
| Pre-season | GK | (Serbia) Nedeljko Stojišić | (Japan) Machida Zelvia | Full transfer |
| Pre-season | GK | (Japan) Kaito Ioka | (Japan) Gainare Tottori | Full transfer |
| Pre-season | DF | (Japan) Wataru Tanaka | (Japan) Montedio Yamagata | Full transfer |
| Pre-season | DF | (Japan) Kyohei Yoshino | (Japan) Yokohama FC | Full transfer |
| Pre-season | DF | (Japan) Yasuhiro Hiraoka | (Japan) Ehime FC | Full transfer |
| Pre-season | DF | (Japan) Hayato Teruyama | (Japan) FC Imabari | Full transfer; Loan made permanent |
| Pre-season | DF | (Japan) Yota Sato | (Japan) Gamba Osaka | Loan expiration |
| Pre-season | MF | (Japan) Takayoshi Ishihara | (Japan) Zweigen Kanazawa | Full transfer |
| Pre-season | MF | (Japan) Kota Osone | (Japan) Fujieda MYFC | Loan transfer |
| Pre-season | MF | (Japan) Takumi Nagura | (Japan) V-Varen Nagasaki | Loan transfer |
| Pre-season | MF | (Argentina) Leandro Desábato | – | Contract expiration |
| Pre-season | MF | (Japan) Shingo Tomita | – | Retirement |
| Pre-season | FW | (Japan) Cayman Togashi | (Japan) Sagan Tosu | Full transfer |
| Pre-season | FW | (Japan) Yusuke Minagawa | (Japan) Renofa Yamaguchi | Full transfer |
| Pre-season | FW | (Brazil) Felippe Cardoso | (Brazil) Santos FC | Loan expiration |

== Competitions ==
=== Overview ===
| Competition | First match | Last match | Starting round | Record | | | | | | | |
| Competition | First match | Last match | Starting round | Pld | W | D | L | GF | GA | GD | Win % |
|---|---|---|---|---|---|---|---|---|---|---|---|
| J2 League | 19 February 2023 | 12 November 2023 | Matchday 1 | 20 | 8 | 6 | 6 | 26 | 21 | +5 | 40.00 |
| Emperor's Cup | 7 June 2023 | | Second round | 1 | 1 | 0 | 0 | 1 | 0 | +1 | 100.00 |
| Total | | | | 21 | 9 | 6 | 6 | 27 | 21 | +6 | 42.86 |

Last updated: 7 June 2023
Source: Soccerway

=== J2 League ===
==== League table ====
| Pos | Team | Pld | W | D | L | GF | GA | GD | Pts |
|---|---|---|---|---|---|---|---|---|---|
| 14 | Roasso Kumamoto | 42 | 13 | 10 | 19 | 52 | 53 | −1 | 49 |
| 15 | Tokushima Vortis | 42 | 10 | 19 | 13 | 43 | 53 | −10 | 49 |
| 16 | Vegalta Sendai | 42 | 12 | 12 | 18 | 48 | 61 | −13 | 48 |
| 17 | Mito HollyHock | 42 | 11 | 14 | 17 | 49 | 66 | −17 | 47 |
| 18 | Iwaki FC | 42 | 12 | 11 | 19 | 45 | 69 | −24 | 47 |

Source: Meiji Yasuda J2 League, J.League Data Site
Rules for classification: 1) Points; 2) Goal difference; 3) Goals scored; 4) Head-to-head points; 5) Head-to-head goal difference; 6) Head-to-head goal scored; 7) Fair-play points.

==== Results summary ====
| Overall | | | | | | | | Home | | | | | | Away | | | | | |
| Pld | W | D | L | GF | GA | GD | Pts | W | D | L | GF | GA | GD | W | D | L | GF | GA | GD |
|---|---|---|---|---|---|---|---|---|---|---|---|---|---|---|---|---|---|---|---|
| 16 | 6 | 5 | 5 | 19 | 16 | +3 | 23 | 3 | 2 | 3 | 9 | 9 | 0 | 3 | 3 | 2 | 10 | 7 | +3 |

Last updated: 18 May 2023.
Source: Worldfootball

==== Results by round ====
| Round | 1 | 2 | 3 | 4 | 5 | 6 | 7 | 8 | 9 | 10 | 11 | 12 | 13 | 14 | 15 | 16 | 17 | 18 | 19 | 20 | 21 | 22 | 23 | 24 | 25 | 26 | 27 | 28 | 29 | 30 | 31 | 32 | 33 | 34 | 35 | 36 | 37 | 38 | 39 | 40 | 41 | 42 |
|---|---|---|---|---|---|---|---|---|---|---|---|---|---|---|---|---|---|---|---|---|---|---|---|---|---|---|---|---|---|---|---|---|---|---|---|---|---|---|---|---|---|---|
| Ground | A | H | A | H | A | H | H | A | A | H | A | H | H | A | H | A | | | | | | | | | | | | | | | | | | | | | | | | | | |
| Result | D | W | D | L | W | L | L | W | D | D | L | W | D | L | W | W | | | | | | | | | | | | | | | | | | | | | | | | | | |
| Position | 10 | 7 | 8 | 12 | 7 | 11 | 16 | 10 | 11 | 12 | 14 | 13 | 14 | 13 | 12 | 11 | | | | | | | | | | | | | | | | | | | | | | | | | | |

Updated to match(es) played on 18 May 2023. Source: Worldfootball
A = Away; H = Home; W = Win; D = Draw; L = Loss

==== Matches ====
The league fixtures were announced on 20 January 2023.

| 19 February 2023 1 | Machida Zelvia | 0–0 | Vegalta Sendai | Machida |
| 14:00 | | Report | | Stadium: Machida Gion Stadium; Attendance: 8,055; Referee: Yosuke Kubota |

| 26 February 2023 2 | Vegalta Sendai | 1–0 | Tochigi SC | Sendai |
| 13:05 | Yamada 90' | Report | | Stadium: Yurtec Stadium Sendai; Attendance: 13,073; Referee: Shu Kawamata |

| 4 March 2023 3 | Tokushima Vortis | 1–1 | Vegalta Sendai | Naruto |
| 14:00 | Tsuboi 90' | Report | Sugata 54' | Stadium: Pocarisweat Stadium; Attendance: 5,553; Referee: Dai Matsumoto |

| 12 March 2023 4 | Vegalta Sendai | 0–1 | Iwaki FC | Sendai |
| 14:00 | | Report | Egawa 20' | Stadium: Yurtec Stadium Sendai; Attendance: 12,269; Referee: Atsushi Kamimura |

| 19 March 2023 5 | Thespakusatsu Gunma | 1–2 | Vegalta Sendai | Maebashi |
| 14:00 | Uchida 57' | Report | Goke 34'; Kim Tae-hyeon 73' | Stadium: Shoda Shoyu Stadium Gunma; Attendance: 3,917; Referee: Tetsuro Yoshida |

| 25 March 2023 6 | Vegalta Sendai | 2–3 | Zweigen Kanazawa | Sendai |
| 14:00 | Kida 41', 90+5' | Report | Ishihara 9'; Hayashi 18'; Fujimura 23' | Stadium: Yurtec Stadium Sendai; Attendance: 9,481; Referee: Toru Kakinuma |

| 1 April 2023 7 | Vegalta Sendai | 0–1 | V-Varen Nagasaki | Sendai |
| 14:00 | | Report | Juanma 50' | Stadium: Yurtec Stadium Sendai; Attendance: 9,085; Referee: Tom Neild (England) |

| 8 April 2023 8 | Ventforet Kofu | 0–3 | Vegalta Sendai | Kofu |
| 13:00 | | Report | Nakajima 25'; Yamada 45+2'; Goke 51' | Stadium: JIT Recycle Ink Stadium; Attendance: 6,804; Referee: Kazuyoshi Enomoto |

| 12 April 2023 9 | Shimizu S-Pulse | 1–1 | Vegalta Sendai | Shimizu |
| 19:00 | Shirasaki 45' | Report | Goke 78' | Stadium: IAI Stadium Nihondaira; Attendance: 6,104; Referee: Ryo Tanimoto |

| 16 April 2023 10 | Vegalta Sendai | 1–1 | Fagiano Okayama | Sendai |
| 14:00 | Nakajima 11' | Report | Sano 48' | Stadium: Yurtec Stadium Sendai; Attendance: 9,857; Referee: Yuichi Nishimura |

| 23 April 2023 11 | Fujieda MYFC | 3–2 | Vegalta Sendai | Fujieda |
| 14:00 | Watanabe 45'; Kubo 86'; Yamura 90+3' | Report | Nakayama 63'; Goke 65' | Stadium: Fujieda Soccer Stadium; Attendance: 2,816; Referee: Dai Matsumoto |

| 29 April 2023 12 | Vegalta Sendai | 1–0 | Oita Trinita | Sendai |
| 14:03 | Sagara 15', (yellow card) 18'; Kamada (yellow card) 56' | Report | Kagawa (red card) 34'; Matheus (yellow card) 52' (yellow-red card) 90+7'; Nagasawa (yellow card) 80' | Stadium: Yurtec Stadium Sendai; Attendance: 10,840; Referee: Keigo Sendachi |

| 3 May 2023 13 | Vegalta Sendai | 2–2 | Blaublitz Akita | Sendai |
| 14:03 | Wakasa (yellow card) 10'; Sagara 39'; Sugata 90+3' | Report | Saito 8', 82' | Stadium: Yurtec Stadium Sendai; Attendance: 15,026; Referee: Shuhei Shimizu |

| 7 May 2023 14 | Mito HollyHock | 1–0 | Vegalta Sendai | Mito |
| 15:03 | Kusano 50' | Report | Akiyama (yellow card) 60' | Stadium: K's denki Stadium Mito; Attendance: 2,886; Referee: Hajime Matsuo |

| 13 May 2023 15 | Vegalta Sendai | 2–1 | Montedio Yamagata | Sendai |
| 14:00 | Kida 32'; Nakajima 90+2' | Report | Nishimura (yellow card) 58'; Fujimoto 85'; Kokubu (yellow card) 87' | Stadium: Yurtec Stadium Sendai; Attendance: 15,163; Referee: Kazuyoshi Enomoto |

| 17 May 2023 16 | Roasso Kumamoto | 0–1 | Vegalta Sendai | Kumamoto |
| 19:00 | Matsuoka (yellow card) 15'; Tashiro (yellow card) 90+3' | Report | Sagara 47'; Heo Yong-joon (yellow card) 90+4' | Stadium: Egao Kenko Stadium; Attendance: 2,884; Referee: Koji Takasaki |

| 21 May 2023 17 | Omiya Ardija | v | Vegalta Sendai | Saitama |
| 14:00 | | Report | | Stadium: NACK5 Stadium Omiya |

| 28 May 2023 18 | Vegalta Sendai | v | JEF United Chiba | Sendai |
| 14:00 | | Report | | Stadium: Yurtec Stadium Sendai |

| 4 June 2023 19 | Tokyo Verdy | v | Vegalta Sendai | Tokyo |
| 14:00 | | Report | | Stadium: Ajinomoto Stadium |

| 11 June 2023 20 | Vegalta Sendai | v | Júbilo Iwata | Sendai |
| 13:05 | | Report | | Stadium: Yurtec Stadium Sendai |

| 18 June 2023 21 | Renofa Yamaguchi | v | Vegalta Sendai | Yamaguchi |
| 14:00 | | Report | | Stadium: Ishin Me-Life Stadium |

| 25 June 2023 22 | Vegalta Sendai | v | Tokushima Vortis | Sendai |
| 18:00 | | Report | | Stadium: Yurtec Stadium Sendai |

=== Emperor's Cup ===
| 7 June 2023 Second round | Vegalta Sendai | 1–0 | Fujieda MYFC | Sendai |
| 19:00 | Nakayama 45' | Report | | Stadium: Yurtec Stadium Sendai; Referee: Koei Koya |
