= 2022 Vegalta Sendai season =

Vegalta Sendai
2022 season
- Chairman: Sasaki Tomohiro
- Manager: Makoto Teguramori; Akira Ito
- Stadium: Yurtec Stadium Sendai
- J2 League: 7th
- Emperor's Cup: 3rd round
- Top goalscorer: League: Masato Nakayama; All: Masato Nakayama
Home colours	Away colours

2022 Vegalta Sendai season.

== Squad ==
As of 24 October 2022.

Note: Flags indicate national team as defined under FIFA eligibility rules; some limited exceptions apply. Players may hold more than one non-FIFA nationality.

No.	Pos.	Nation	Player
1	GK	JPN	Yuma Obata
2	DF	JPN	Yosuke Akiyama
3	DF	JPN	Naoya Fukumori
4	DF	JPN	Koji Hachisuka
5	DF	JPN	Masashi Wakasa
6	MF	ARG	Leandro Desábato
8	MF	JPN	Yoshiki Matsushita
9	FW	JPN	Masato Nakayama
10	MF	PRK	Ryang Yong-gi
13	DF	JPN	Yasuhiro Hiraoka
14	MF	JPN	Takayoshi Ishihara
15	FW	BRA	Felippe Cardoso (on loan from Santos FC)
16	DF	JPN	Kyohei Yoshino
17	MF	JPN	Shingo Tomita
18	MF	JPN	Ryoma Kida
19	FW	JPN	Yusuke Minagawa
20	DF	KOR	Kim Tae-hyeon (on loan from Ulsan Hyundai)
21	GK	JPN	Kaito Ioka

No.	Pos.	Nation	Player
22	GK	SRB	Nedeljko Stojišić
23	GK	JPN	Daichi Sugimoto
24	MF	JPN	Kota Osone
25	DF	JPN	Takumi Mase
26	MF	JPN	Chihiro Kato
28	MF	JPN	Takumi Nagura (on loan from V-Varen Nagasaki)
30	MF	JPN	Wataru Tanaka
31	DF	JPN	Hayato Teruyama
32	MF	JPN	Hiromu Kamada
35	MF	BRA	Foguinho
40	MF	JPN	Ryota Kobayashi ^{Type 2}
41	DF	JPN	Yuto Uchida
42	FW	JPN	Cayman Togashi
43	DF	JPN	Taiki Yamada ^{Type 2}
44	FW	JPN	Motohiko Nakajima (on loan from Cerezo Osaka)
46	MF	JPN	George Onaiwu ^{DSP}
47	DF	JPN	Yota Sato (on loan from Gamba Osaka)
48	MF	JPN	Ryunosuke Sugawara ^{DSP}
50	MF	JPN	Yasushi Endo

== J2 League ==
=== League table ===
Pos	Team	Pld	W	D	L	GF	GA	GD	Pts	Promotion or relegation
5	Oita Trinita	42	17	15	10	62	52	+10	66	Qualification for the promotion play-offs
6	Montedio Yamagata	42	17	13	12	62	40	+22	64	Qualification for the promotion play-offs
7	Vegalta Sendai	42	18	9	15	67	59	+8	63	
8	Tokushima Vortis	42	13	23	6	48	35	+13	62	
9	Tokyo Verdy	42	16	13	13	62	55	+7	61	

Source: Meiji Yasuda J2 League, J.League Data Site
Rules for classification: 1) Points; 2) Goal difference; 3) Goals scored; 4) Head-to-head points; 5) Head-to-head goal difference; 6) Head-to-head goal scored; 7) Fair-play points.

=== Match details ===
J2 League match details
Match	Date	Team	Score	Team	Venue	Attendance
1	2022.02.20	Vegalta Sendai	0–0	Albirex Niigata	Yurtec Stadium Sendai	9,617
2	2022.02.27	Mito HollyHock	2–3	Vegalta Sendai	K's denki Stadium Mito	4,673
3	2022.03.06	Vegalta Sendai	0–0	Thespakusatsu Gunma	Yurtec Stadium Sendai	7,072
4	2022.03.12	Vegalta Sendai	3–0	Iwate Grulla Morioka	Yurtec Stadium Sendai	7,207
5	2022.03.20	Montedio Yamagata	2–3	Vegalta Sendai	ND Soft Stadium Yamagata	11,456
6	2022.03.26	Vegalta Sendai	0–3	FC Machida Zelvia	Yurtec Stadium Sendai	7,234
7	2022.03.30	Vegalta Sendai	1–3	Oita Trinita	Yurtec Stadium Sendai	5,447
8	2022.04.03	Ventforet Kofu	2–3	Vegalta Sendai	JIT Recycle Ink Stadium	3,037
9	2022.04.10	Vegalta Sendai	2–1	Renofa Yamaguchi FC	Yurtec Stadium Sendai	7,613
10	2022.04.17	Yokohama FC	2–1	Vegalta Sendai	NHK Spring Mitsuzawa Football Stadium	5,475
11	2022.04.23	Vegalta Sendai	2–0	FC Ryukyu	Yurtec Stadium Sendai	6,657
12	2022.04.27	Roasso Kumamoto	0–2	Vegalta Sendai	Egao Kenko Stadium	1,671
13	2022.05.01	Vegalta Sendai	3–1	Blaublitz Akita	Yurtec Stadium Sendai	9,612
14	2022.05.04	Tokyo Verdy	3–1	Vegalta Sendai	Ajinomoto Stadium	12,521
15	2022.05.08	V-Varen Nagasaki	0–2	Vegalta Sendai	Transcosmos Stadium Nagasaki	10,345
16	2022.05.15	Vegalta Sendai	4–1	Zweigen Kanazawa	Yurtec Stadium Sendai	8,536
17	2022.05.21	Omiya Ardija	2–4	Vegalta Sendai	NACK5 Stadium Omiya	6,388
18	2022.05.25	Vegalta Sendai	0–0	Fagiano Okayama	City Light Stadium	6,358
19	2022.05.29	Vegalta Sendai	2–1	Tochigi SC	Yurtec Stadium Sendai	9,273
20	2022.06.05	JEF United Chiba	2–0	Vegalta Sendai	Fukuda Denshi Arena	7,401
21	2022.06.11	Tokushima Vortis	2–2	Vegalta Sendai	Pocarisweat Stadium	2,965
22	2022.06.18	Vegalta Sendai	2–3	Yokohama FC	Yurtec Stadium Sendai	11,988
23	2022.06.25	Vegalta Sendai	1–1	Montedio Yamagata	Yurtec Stadium Sendai	15,372
24	2022.07.02	FC Machida Zelvia	2–3	Vegalta Sendai	Machida GION Stadium	3,281
25	2022.07.06	Vegalta Sendai	3–0	Ventforet Kofu	Yurtec Stadium Sendai	5,488
26	2022.07.10	FC Ryukyu	1–1	Vegalta Sendai	Tapic Kenso Hiyagon Stadium	2,012
27	2022.07.16	Iwate Grulla Morioka	1–5	Vegalta Sendai	Iwagin Stadium	3,029
28	2022.07.23	Vegalta Sendai	1–2	V-Varen Nagasaki	Yurtec Stadium Sendai	11,338
29	2022.07.30	Renofa Yamaguchi FC	2–2	Vegalta Sendai	Ishin Me-Life Stadium	3,588
30	2022.08.06	Zweigen Kanazawa	1–4	Vegalta Sendai	Ishikawa Athletics Stadium	3,215
31	2022.08.13	Vegalta Sendai	2–3	Omiya Ardija	Yurtec Stadium Sendai	12,920
32	2022.08.20	Thespakusatsu Gunma	1–0	Vegalta Sendai	Shoda Shoyu Stadium Gunma	4,142
33	2022.08.27	Vegalta Sendai	0–2	JEF United Chiba	Yurtec Stadium Sendai	9,310
34	2022.09.03	Vegalta Sendai	1–2	Mito HollyHock	Yurtec Stadium Sendai	7,139
35	2022.09.10	Oita Trinita	1–0	Vegalta Sendai	Showa Denko Dome Oita	7,705
36	2022.09.14	Tochigi SC	0–1	Vegalta Sendai	Kanseki Stadium Tochigi	3,514
37	2022.09.18	Vegalta Sendai	1–1	Tokushima Vortis	Yurtec Stadium Sendai	7,727
38	2022.09.25	Fagiano Okayama	3–0	Vegalta Sendai	City Light Stadium	11,661
39	2022.10.02	Vegalta Sendai	0–2	Tokyo Verdy	Yurtec Stadium Sendai	11,187
40	2022.10.08	Albirex Niigata	3–0	Vegalta Sendai	Denka Big Swan Stadium	32,979
41	2022.10.16	Vegalta Sendai	2–1	Roasso Kumamoto	Yurtec Stadium Sendai	11,715
42	2022.10.23	Blaublitz Akita	0–0	Vegalta Sendai	Soyu Stadium	5,404

*In order to prevent coronavirus, the number of visitors will be increased in stages.
