= 2020 Vegalta Sendai season =

Vegalta Sendai
2020 season
- Chairman: Sasaki Tomohiro
- Manager: Takashi Kiyama
- Stadium: Yurtec Stadium Sendai
- J1 League: 17th
- J.League Cup: Group stage
- Emperor's Cup: non-participation
- Top goalscorer: League: Shun Nagasawa; All: Shun Nagasawa
Home colours	Away colours

2020 Vegalta Sendai season.

== Squad ==
As of 14 January 2021.

Note: Flags indicate national team as defined under FIFA eligibility rules; some limited exceptions apply. Players may hold more than one non-FIFA nationality.

No.	Pos.	Nation	Player
2	DF	(Brazil) BRA	Pará
3	MF	(Japan) JPN	Ryutaro Iio
4	DF	(Japan) JPN	Koji Hachisuka
5	MF	(Japan) JPN	Keiya Shiihashi
6	MF	(Japan) JPN	Shingo Hyodo
7	MF	(Japan) JPN	Kunimitsu Sekiguchi
8	MF	(Japan) JPN	Yoshiki Matsushita
9	MF	(Spain) ESP	Isaac Cuenca
11	FW	(Japan) JPN	Shuhei Akasaki
13	DF	(Japan) JPN	Yasuhiro Hiraoka
14	MF	(Japan) JPN	Takayoshi Ishihara
15	FW	(Japan) JPN	Takuma Nishimura
16	MF	(Japan) JPN	Kyohei Yoshino
17	MF	(Japan) JPN	Shingo Tomita
19	FW	(Japan) JPN	Ryo Germain
20	FW	(Japan) JPN	Shun Nagasawa

No.	Pos.	Nation	Player
21	GK	(Japan) JPN	Kentaro Seki
22	GK	(Japan) JPN	Goro Kawanami
23	DF	(Mozambique) MOZ	Simão Mate
24	GK	(Japan) JPN	Yuma Obata
26	DF	(Japan) JPN	Takuma Hamasaki
27	GK	(Poland) POL	Jakub Słowik
28	MF	(Japan) JPN	Takumi Sasaki
29	FW	(Portugal) POR	Alexandre Guedes
30	MF	(Japan) JPN	Wataru Tanaka
31	DF	(Japan) JPN	Hayato Teruyama
33	DF	(Japan) JPN	Masato Tokida
36	DF	(Japan) JPN	Takahiro Yanagi
37	MF	(Japan) JPN	Shogo Nakahara
39	DF	(South Korea) KOR	Kim Jung-ya
42	FW	(Japan) JPN	Hiroto Yamada

== J1 League ==
=== League table ===
Pos	Team	Pld	W	D	L	GF	GA	GD	Pts
14	Vissel Kobe	34	9	9	16	50	59	−9	36
15	Yokohama FC	34	9	6	19	38	60	−22	33
16	Shimizu S-Pulse	34	7	7	20	48	70	−22	28
17	Vegalta Sendai	34	6	10	18	36	61	−25	28
18	Shonan Bellmare	34	6	9	19	29	48	−19	27

Source: Meiji Yasuda J1 League
Rules for classification: 1) Points; 2) Goal difference; 3) Head-to-head points; 4) Head-to-head goal difference; 5) Head-to-head goal scored; 6) Number of wins; 7) Goals scored; 8) Fair-play points.

=== Match details ===
J1 League match details
Match	Date	Team	Score	Team	Venue	Attendance
1	2020.02.22	Vegalta Sendai	1–1	Nagoya Grampus	Yurtec Stadium Sendai	13,968
2	2020.07.04	Shonan Bellmare	0–1	Vegalta Sendai	Shonan BMW Stadium Hiratsuka	0
3	2020.07.08	Vegalta Sendai	1–2	Urawa Reds	Yurtec Stadium Sendai	0
4	2020.07.12	Yokohama FC	1–1	Vegalta Sendai	NHK Spring Mitsuzawa Football Stadium	2,235
5	2020.07.18	Vegalta Sendai	2–2	Hokkaido Consadole Sapporo	Yurtec Stadium Sendai	2,597
6	2020.07.22	Vegalta Sendai	2–3	Kawasaki Frontale	Yurtec Stadium Sendai	2,507
7	2020.07.26	Kashiwa Reysol	5–1	Vegalta Sendai	Sankyo Frontier Kashiwa Stadium	2,500
8	2020.08.01	Vegalta Sendai	0–1	Yokohama F. Marinos	Yurtec Stadium Sendai	2,758
9	2020.08.08	Vissel Kobe	1–2	Vegalta Sendai	Noevir Stadium Kobe	4,333
10	2020.08.15	Vegalta Sendai	0–0	Shimizu S-Pulse	Yurtec Stadium Sendai	2,718
12	2020.08.23	Cerezo Osaka	2–1	Vegalta Sendai	Yanmar Stadium Nagai	3,291
13	2020.08.29	Sanfrecce Hiroshima	1–1	Vegalta Sendai	Edion Stadium Hiroshima	3,124
14	2020.09.05	Vegalta Sendai	1–4	Gamba Osaka	Yurtec Stadium Sendai	2,871
15	2020.09.09	Kashima Antlers	2–1	Vegalta Sendai	Kashima Soccer Stadium	3,839
16	2020.09.13	Vegalta Sendai	0–3	Oita Trinita	Yurtec Stadium Sendai	2,191
17	2020.09.20	FC Tokyo	1–0	Vegalta Sendai	Ajinomoto Stadium	4,981
18	2020.09.23	Yokohama F. Marinos	3–1	Vegalta Sendai	Nissan Stadium	3,702
19	2020.09.27	Vegalta Sendai	2–3	Cerezo Osaka	Yurtec Stadium Sendai	2,789
20	2020.10.03	Hokkaido Consadole Sapporo	3–3	Vegalta Sendai	Sapporo Dome	5,339
21	2020.10.10	Kawasaki Frontale	1–0	Vegalta Sendai	Kawasaki Todoroki Stadium	8,263
22	2020.10.14	Vegalta Sendai	0–0	Yokohama FC	Yurtec Stadium Sendai	3,714
23	2020.10.18	Urawa Reds	6–0	Vegalta Sendai	Saitama Stadium 2002	9,831
24	2020.10.24	Nagoya Grampus	1–0	Vegalta Sendai	Paloma Mizuho Stadium	9,367
30	2020.10.28	Vegalta Sendai	2–3	Vissel Kobe	Yurtec Stadium Sendai	4,071
25	2020.10.31	Vegalta Sendai	0–0	Sanfrecce Hiroshima	Yurtec Stadium Sendai	4,001
11	2020.11.08	Vegalta Sendai	0–3	Sagan Tosu	Yurtec Stadium Sendai	5,995
27	2020.11.14	Gamba Osaka	4–0	Vegalta Sendai	Panasonic Stadium Suita	11,567
32	2020.11.18	Vegalta Sendai	2–2	FC Tokyo	Yurtec Stadium Sendai	3,030
28	2020.11.21	Vegalta Sendai	1–3	Kashima Antlers	Yurtec Stadium Sendai	7,487
29	2020.11.25	Sagan Tosu	0–2	Vegalta Sendai	Ekimae Real Estate Stadium	3,694
26	2020.12.01	Vegalta Sendai	0–2	Kashiwa Reysol	Yurtec Stadium Sendai	2,720
31	2020.12.06	Oita Trinita	0–2	Vegalta Sendai	Showa Denko Dome Oita	6,289
33	2020.12.16	Shimizu S-Pulse	2–3	Vegalta Sendai	IAI Stadium Nihondaira	5,023
34	2020.12.19	Vegalta Sendai	0–0	Shonan Bellmare	Yurtec Stadium Sendai	7,356

*In order to prevent coronavirus, the number of visitors will be increased in stages.

== J.League Cup ==
Match	Date	Team	Score	Team	Venue	Attendance
Group B-1	2020.02.16	Urawa Reds	5-2	Vegalta Sendai	Saitama Stadium 2002	19,589
Group B-2	2020.08.05	No Game				
Group B-3	2020.08.12	Vegalta Sendai	0-3	Cerezo Osaka	Yurtec Stadium Sendai	1,840

*
