= Ewerton (footballer, born 1992) =

Brazilian footballer

Personal information
- Full name: Ewerton da Silva Pereira
- Date of birth: 1 December 1992 (age 33)
- Place of birth: São Paulo, Brazil
- Height: 1.79 m (5 ft 10 in)
- Position: Midfielder

Team information
- Current team: Kanchanaburi Power
- Number: 8

Youth career
- 2011: Fluminense

Senior career*
Years	Team	Apps	(Gls)
2012–2013	Fluminense	0	(0)
2012–2013	→ América de Natal (loan)	11	(1)
2013–2014	→ Desportivo Brasil (loan)	0	(0)
2014	→ Paulista (loan)	8	(0)
2014	→ Madureira (loan)	0	(0)
2014–2018	Portimonense	142	(8)
2018–2021	Porto	0	(0)
2018	→ Portimonense (loan)	13	(1)
2019–2021	→ Urawa Red Diamonds (loan)	51	(4)
2021	→ Portimonense (loan)	18	(1)
2021–2024	Portimonense	27	(2)
2023	→ Vegalta Sendai (loan)	33	(1)
2024	Hanoi FC	5	(0)
2024–2025	Penafiel	28	(2)
2025–2026	Kanchanaburi Power	25	(1)
- * Club domestic league appearances and goals as of 2 July 2025

Ewerton da Silva Pereira, known as Ewerton (born 1 December 1992) is a Brazilian professional footballer who plays as a midfielder for Thai League 1 club Kanchanaburi Power.

== Club career ==
=== Brazil ===
Ewerton started his career at Fluminense. In April 2012, he joined Campeonato Brasileiro Série B club América de Natal on loan. He made his professional debut, on 19 June 2012, in a game against ASA. This was followed by a loan spell at Desportivo Brasil.

In July 2013, Ewerton was loaned to Paulista, where he made five appearances in the Copa Paulista.

=== Portimonense ===
In August 2014, Ewerton joined Portuguese club Portimonense, where he won the LigaPro in 2016–17.

=== FC Porto and loans ===
On 2 July 2018, after four seasons at Portimonense, Ewerton signed a four-year contract with fellow Primeira Liga side Porto, for a reported fee of €2 million. However, he failed to convince Porto's manager Sérgio Conceição during pre-season, and returned on loan to Portimonense on 24 July.

In January 2019, Ewerton joined J1 League club Urawa Red Diamonds on loan until July 2019. The loan was later extended until the end of 2020.

=== Return to Portimonense ===
On 7 January 2021, Ewerton returned to Portimonense on a season-long loan from Porto.

At the end of the 2020–21 season, Ewerton's terminated his contract with Porto and signed a three-year deal with Portimonense, with a release clause set at €20 million. Porto kept 50% of the player's economic rights.

==== Loan to Vegalta Sendai ====
On 15 November 2022, it was announced that Portimonense would send Ewerton on loan to J2 League side Vegalta Sendai for the 2023 season.

=== Hanoi FC ===
On 11 March 2024, Hanoi FC announced that Ewenton had joined the club via their website.
