= Chihiro Kato (footballer) =

Japanese footballer

Personal information
- Date of birth: 12 December 1998 (age 27)
- Place of birth: Tokyo, Japan
- Height: 1.75 m (5 ft 9 in)
- Position: Midfielder

Team information
- Current team: Mito HollyHock
- Number: 8

Youth career
- 2014–2016: RKU Kashiwa High School

College career
| Years | Team | Apps | (Gls) |
| 2017–2020 | Ryutsu Keizai University | | |

Senior career*
| Years | Team | Apps | (Gls) |
| 2017–2019 | RKD Ryugasaki | 50 | (5) |
| 2020–2023 | Vegalta Sendai | 61 | (3) |
| 2024-2025 | Montedio Yamagata | 18 | (0) |
| 2025- | Mito HollyHock | 30 | (5) |
- * Club domestic league appearances and goals as of 12 August 2026

Chihiro Kato (加藤 千尋, Kato Chihiro; born 12 December 1998) is a Japanese footballer currently playing as a midfielder for Mito HollyHock.

== Career statistics ==
=== Club ===
As of 15 September 2022.

| Club | Season | League | | | National Cup | | League Cup | | Other | | Total | |
| Club | Season | Division | Apps | Goals | Apps | Goals | Apps | Goals | Apps | Goals | Apps | Goals |
|---|---|---|---|---|---|---|---|---|---|---|---|---|
| RKD Ryugasaki | 2017 | JFL | 5 | 0 | 0 | 0 | – | | - | | 5 | 0 |
| RKD Ryugasaki | 2018 | JFL | 19 | 0 | 1 | 1 | – | | - | | 20 | 1 |
| RKD Ryugasaki | 2019 | JFL | 26 | 5 | 0 | 0 | – | | - | | 26 | 5 |
| RKD Ryugasaki | Total | | 50 | 5 | 1 | 1 | 0 | 0 | 0 | 0 | 51 | 6 |
| Vegalta Sendai | 2020 | J1 League | 0 | 0 | - | - | 0 | 0 | - | | 0 | 0 |
| Vegalta Sendai | 2021 | J1 League | 34 | 3 | 0 | 0 | 6 | 2 | - | | 40 | 5 |
| Vegalta Sendai | 2022 | J2 League | 27 | 0 | 2 | 2 | - | - | - | | 29 | 2 |
| Vegalta Sendai | Total | | 61 | 3 | 2 | 2 | 6 | 2 | 0 | 0 | 69 | 7 |
| Career total | | | 111 | 8 | 3 | 3 | 6 | 2 | 0 | 0 | 120 | 13 |
