= Takumi Nagura =

Japanese footballer

Takumi Nagura 名倉 巧
Personal information
- Full name: Takumi Nagura
- Date of birth: June 3, 1998 (age 28)
- Place of birth: Adachi, Tokyo, Japan
- Height: 1.68 m (5 ft 6 in)
- Position: Midfielder

Team information
- Current team: V-Varen Nagasaki
- Number: 14

Youth career
- –2010: FC Leezu
- 2011–2013: FC Tokyo
- 2014–2016: Kokugakuin Univ. Kugayama High School

Senior career*
Years	Team	Apps	(Gls)
2017	FC Ryukyu	23	(4)
2018–	V-Varen Nagasaki	99	(10)
2022	→ Vegalta Sendai (loan)	31	(4)
- * Club domestic league appearances and goals as of 1 January 2026

Takumi Nagura (名倉 巧, Nagura Takumi; born June 3, 1998) is a Japanese football player. He plays for V-Varen Nagasaki.

== Career ==
Takumi Nagura joined J3 League club FC Ryukyu in 2017.

In January 2018, after just one season in Okinawa, he opted to sign for newly-promoted J1's team V-Varen Nagasaki.

== Club statistics ==
Updated to 15 September 2022.

Club	Season	League			National Cup		League Cup		Other		Total	
Club	Season	Division	Apps	Goals	Apps	Goals	Apps	Goals	Apps	Goals	Apps	Goals
FC Ryukyu	2017	J3 League	22	4	1	0	-	-	-	-	23	4
V-Varen Nagasaki	2018	J1 League	3	0	0	0	6	1	-	-	9	1
V-Varen Nagasaki	2019	J2 League	0	0	1	1	8	0	-	-	9	1
V-Varen Nagasaki	2020	J2 League	27	5	-	-	-	-	-	-	27	5
V-Varen Nagasaki	2021	J2 League	25	3	1	0	-	-	-	-	26	3
Vegalta Sendai (loan)	2022	J2 League	-	-	1	0	-	-	-	-	-	-
Career total			77	12	4	1	14	1	0	0	94	14
