= Takumi Mase =

Japanese footballer

Takumi Mase 真瀬 拓海
Personal information
- Date of birth: 3 May 1998 (age 28)
- Place of birth: Chiba, Japan
- Height: 1.75 m (5 ft 9 in)
- Position: Right back

Team information
- Current team: Mito HollyHock
- Number: 25

Youth career
- 2015–2017: Ichiritsu Funabashi High School

College career
Years	Team	Apps	(Gls)
2017–2020	Hannan University		

Senior career*
Years	Team	Apps	(Gls)
2020–2025	Vegalta Sendai	169	(7)
2026–	Mito HollyHock	18	(0)
- * Club domestic league appearances and goals as of 12 August 2026

Takumi Mase (真瀬 拓海, Mase Takumi; born 3 May 1998) is a Japanese footballer currently playing as a defender for J1 League club Mito HollyHock.

== Career ==
At Hannan University, he served as captain.

== Career statistics ==
=== Club ===
As of 18 April 2026.

Appearances and goals by club, season and competition
Club	Season	League			National cup (Note: Includes Emperors Cup)		League cup (Note: Includes J.League Cup)		Other		Total	
Club	Season	Division	Apps	Goals	Apps	Goals	Apps	Goals	Apps	Goals	Apps	Goals
Vegalta Sendai	2020	J1 League	11	0	0	0	1	0	0	0	12	0
Vegalta Sendai	2021	J1 League	37	2	1	0	6	0	0	0	44	2
Vegalta Sendai	2022	J2 League	39	4	2	0	0	0	0	0	41	4
Vegalta Sendai	2023	J2 League	18	0	0	0	0	0	0	0	18	0
Vegalta Sendai	2024	J2 League	26	1	0	0	0	0	2 (Note: Appearance in J1/J2 play-offs)	0	28	1
Vegalta Sendai	2025	J2 League	38	0	0	0	0	0	0	0	38	0
Vegalta Sendai	Total		169	7	3	0	7	0	2	0	181	7
Mito HollyHock	2026	J1 (100)	9	0	–		–		–		9	0
Career total			178	7	3	0	7	0	2	0	190	7
