= Masahiro Sugata =

Japanese footballer

Personal information
- Date of birth: 28 June 1997 (age 29)
- Height: 1.83 m (6 ft 0 in)
- Position: Defender

Team information
- Current team: Vegalta Sendai
- Number: 5

Youth career
- –2009: Katsuragi Toma FC
- 2010–2012: Hakuho Junior High School
- 2013–2015: Kunimi High School

College career
Years	Team	Apps	(Gls)
2016–2019	Fukuoka University		

Senior career*
Years	Team	Apps	(Gls)
2020–2022	Roasso Kumamoto	87	(5)
2023-	Vegalta Sendai	129	(12)
- * Club domestic league appearances and goals as of 17 August 2026

Masahiro Sugata (菅田 真啓, Sugata Masahiro; born 28 June 1997) is a Japanese footballer currently playing as a defender for Vegalta Sendai.

== Career statistics ==
=== Club ===
As of 29 November 2022.

Club	Season	League			National Cup		League Cup		Other		Total	
Club	Season	Division	Apps	Goals	Apps	Goals	Apps	Goals	Apps	Goals	Apps	Goals
Roasso Kumamoto	2020	J3 League	22	0	–		–		–		22	0
Roasso Kumamoto	2021	J3 League	25	1	2	0	–		–		27	1
Roasso Kumamoto	2022	J2 League	40	4	2	1	–		3	0	45	5
Roasso Kumamoto	Total		87	5	4	1	-	-	3	0	94	6
Vegalta Sendai	2023	J2 League	-	-	-	-	–		-	-	-	-
Vegalta Sendai	Total		-	-	-	-	-	-	-	-	-	-
Career total			87	5	4	1	0	0	3	0	94	6
