= Koki Matsuzawa =

Japanese footballer (born 1992)

Personal information
- Date of birth: 3 April 1992 (age 34)
- Place of birth: Yokohama, Kanagawa, Japan
- Height: 1.82 m (6 ft 0 in)
- Position: Goalkeeper

Team information
- Current team: Vegalta Sendai
- Number: 29

Youth career
- 1999–2003: Johoku Asuka FC
- 2004–2007: Tokyo Verdy
- 2008–2010: RKU Kashiwa High School

College career
Years	Team	Apps	(Gls)
2011–2014	Waseda University		

Senior career*
Years	Team	Apps	(Gls)
2012	JEF United Chiba	0	(0)
2015–2016	Vissel Kobe	0	(0)
2017–2023	Tokushima Vortis	1	(0)
2023	→ Vegalta Sendai (loan)	0	(0)
2024–	Vegalta Sendai	2	(0)

International career
2007	Japan U15		
2008	Japan U16		
2009	Japan U17		
- * Club domestic league appearances and goals as of 17 August 2026

Koki Matsuzawa (松澤 香輝, Matsuzawa Koki; born 3 April 1992) is a Japanese footballer currently playing as a goalkeeper for Vegalta Sendai.

== Career statistics ==
=== Club ===
As of 10 December 2022.

Club	Season	League			National Cup		League Cup		Other		Total	
Club	Season	Division	Apps	Goals	Apps	Goals	Apps	Goals	Apps	Goals	Apps	Goals
JEF United Chiba	2012	J.League Division 2	0	0	0	0	0	0	0	0	0	0
Vissel Kobe	2015	J1 League	0	0	0	0	0	0	0	0	0	0
Vissel Kobe	2016	J1 League	0	0	0	0	0	0	0	0	0	0
Vissel Kobe	Total		0	0	0	0	0	0	0	0	0	0
Tokushima Vortis	2017	J2 League	0	0	0	0	0	0	0	0	0	0
Tokushima Vortis	2018	J2 League	0	0	0	0	0	0	0	0	0	0
Tokushima Vortis	2019	J2 League	0	0	0	0	0	0	0	0	0	0
Tokushima Vortis	2020	J2 League	0	0	0	0	0	0	0	0	0	0
Tokushima Vortis	2021	J1 League	0	0	0	0	0	0	0	0	0	0
Tokushima Vortis	2022	J2 League	1	0	0	0	4 (Note: Appearances in the J.League Cup)	0	0	0	5	0
Tokushima Vortis	Total		1	0	0	0	4	0	0	0	5	0
Career total			1	0	0	0	4	0	0	0	5	0

== Honours ==
Tokushima Vortis

- J2 League (1): 2020
