= Masashi Wakasa =

Japanese footballer

Masashi Wakasa 若狭 大志
Personal information
- Full name: Masashi Wakasa
- Date of birth: July 24, 1989 (age 37)
- Place of birth: Iwatsuki, Saitama, Japan
- Height: 1.80 m (5 ft 11 in)
- Position: Centre back

Team information
- Current team: Vegalta Sendai
- Number: 5

Youth career
- 2008–2011: Toyo University

Senior career*
Years	Team	Apps	(Gls)
2012–2015	Oita Trinita	102	(7)
2016–2017	JEF United Chiba	34	(0)
2018–2021	Tokyo Verdy	113	(3)
2022–	Vegalta Sendai	26	(1)
- * Club domestic league appearances and goals as of 3 November 2022

Masashi Wakasa (若狭 大志, Wakasa Masashi; born July 24, 1989) is a Japanese football player for Vegalta Sendai.

== Club statistics ==
Updated to end of 2022 season.

Club	Season	League			National Cup		League Cup		Other^{1}		Total	
Club	Season	Division	Apps	Goals	Apps	Goals	Apps	Goals	Apps	Goals	Apps	Goals
Oita Trinita	2012	J2 League	6	0	1	0	ー		1	0	8	0
Oita Trinita	2013	J1 League	18	2	3	0	5	0	ー		26	2
Oita Trinita	2014	J2 League	30	2	2	0	ー		ー		32	2
Oita Trinita	2015	J2 League	33	2	2	1	ー		1	0	36	3
Oita Trinita	Total		87	6	8	1	5	0	2	0	102	7
JEF United Chiba	2016	J2 League	20	0	2	0	ー		ー		22	0
JEF United Chiba	2017	J2 League	12	0	0	0	ー		ー		12	0
JEF United Chiba	Total		32	0	2	0	0	0	0	0	34	0
Tokyo Verdy	2018	J2 League	4	0	3	0	ー		ー		7	0
Tokyo Verdy	2019	J2 League	26	1	0	0	ー		ー		26	1
Tokyo Verdy	2020	J2 League	38	2	-	-	ー		ー		38	2
Tokyo Verdy	2021	J2 League	41	0	1	0	ー		ー		42	0
Tokyo Verdy	Total		109	3	4	0	0	0	0	0	113	3
Vegalta Sendai	2022	J2 League	26	1	2	0	ー		ー		28	1
Career total			254	10	16	1	5	0	2	0	275	1

^{1}Includes J1 Promotion Playoffs and J2/J3 Relegation Playoffs.
