= Naoya Fukumori =

Japanese footballer

Personal information
- Full name: Naoya Fukumori
- Date of birth: 29 August 1992 (age 34)
- Place of birth: Osaka, Japan
- Height: 1.82 m (6 ft 0 in)
- Position: Defender

Team information
- Current team: FC Imabari
- Number: 3

Youth career
- 2008–2010: Konko Osaka High School

College career
Years	Team	Apps	(Gls)
2011–2014	Kwansei Gakuin University		

Senior career*
Years	Team	Apps	(Gls)
2015–2019	Oita Trinita	116	(1)
2019–2021	Shimizu S-Pulse	21	(1)
2021–2024	Vegalta Sendai	43	(0)
2024-	FC Imabari	32	(0)
Total		212	(2)
- * Club domestic league appearances and goals as of 1 January 2026

Naoya Fukumori (福森 直也, Fukumori Naoya; born 29 August 1992 in Osaka) is a Japanese footballer who plays as a defender for FC Imabari.

== Career statistics ==
Updated to 6 November 2022.

Appearances and goals by club, season and competition
Club	Season	League			Emperor's Cup		J.League Cup		Total	
Club	Season	Division	Apps	Goals	Apps	Goals	Apps	Goals	Apps	Goals
Oita Trinita	2015	J2 League	2	0	1	0	—		3	0
Oita Trinita	2016	J3 League	24	1	1	0	—		25	1
Oita Trinita	2017	J2 League	38	0	1	0	—		39	0
Oita Trinita	2018	J2 League	37	0	—		—		37	0
Oita Trinita	2019	J1 League	9	0	1	0	2	0	12	0
Shimizu S-Pulse	2020	J1 League	—		—		2	0	2	0
Shimizu S-Pulse	2021	J1 League	9	0	2	0	8	1	19	1
Vegalta Sendai	2021	J1 League	13	0	0	0	0	0	13	0
Vegalta Sendai	2022	J2 League	13	0	1	0	—		14	0
Career total			145	1	7	0	12	1	164	2
