= Motohiko Nakajima =

Japanese footballer (born 1999)

Motohiko Nakajima 中島 元彦
Personal information
- Full name: Motohiko Nakajima
- Date of birth: April 18, 1999 (age 27)
- Place of birth: Osaka, Japan
- Height: 1.70 m (5 ft 7 in)
- Position: Attacking midfielder

Team information
- Current team: Vegalta Sendai
- Number: 7

Youth career
- –2007: Suita Minami FC
- 2008–2017: Cerezo Osaka

Senior career*
Years	Team	Apps	(Gls)
2016–2026	Cerezo Osaka	67	(7)
2016–2019	→ Cerezo Osaka U-23 (loan)	78	(19)
2020-2021	→ Albirex Niigata (loan)	35	(5)
2022–2024	→ Vegalta Sendai (loan)	105	(25)
2026–	Vegalta Sendai	2	(0)
- * Club domestic league appearances and goals as of 17 August 2026

Motohiko Nakajima (中島 元彦, Motohiko Nakajima; born April 18, 1999) is a Japanese football player who plays for Vegalta Sendai.

== Career ==
=== Cerezo Osaka ===
On 29 September 2017, Nakajima was promoted to the first team. On June 6 2020, it was announced that he would return to Cerezo Osaka for the 2021 season. He made his league debut against Yokohama F. Marinos on 6 April 2021. Nakajima scored his first league goal and his first goal in the J1 League against Avispa Fukuoka on 10 April 2021.

=== Cerezo Osaka U-23 ===
He made his league debut in J3 League v Kagoshima United FC. On 2 December 2018, during the Osaka derby, Nakajima scored and assisted in a 2-0 win.

=== Loan to Albirex Niigata ===
On 20 July 2020, Nakajima joined Albirex Niigata. He made his league debut against Mito HollyHock on 25 July 2020. Nakajima scored his first league goal against Machida Zelvia on 4 October 2020, scoring in the 45th+1st minute.

=== Loan to Vegalta Sendai ===
On 6 April 2022, Nakajima was announced at Vegalta Sendai. He made his league debut against Renofa Yamaguchi on 10 April 2022. Nakajima scored his first league goal against Zweigen Kanazawa on 15 May 2022, scoring in the 38th minute.

Nakajima won the 2022 MVP of the Year award, as chosen by the supporters.

Nakajima won the May 2024 Meiji Yasuda J2 League MVP award.

== International career ==
In February 2017, Nakajima was selected for the Japan U18s tour of Spain.

== Style of play ==
Nakajima can play as a midfielder or forward, and has been praised for being able to strike a free kick with either foot well.

== Club statistics ==
Updated to 14 September 2022.

Appearances and goals by club, season and competition
Club	Season	League			National Cup		League Cup		Continental		Total	
Club	Season	Division	Apps	Goals	Apps	Goals	Apps	Goals	Apps	Goals	Apps	Goals
Cerezo Osaka U-23	2016	J3 League	3	0	-	-	-	-	—		3	0
Cerezo Osaka U-23	2017	J3 League	10	3	-	-	-	-	—		10	3
Cerezo Osaka U-23	2018	J3 League	31	7	-	-	-	-	—		31	7
Cerezo Osaka U-23	2019	J3 League	34	9	-	-	-	-	—		34	9
Cerezo Osaka U-23	Total		78	19	0	0	0	0	0	0	78	19
Albirex Niigata (loan)	2020	J2 League	35	5	-	-	-	-	—		35	5
Cerezo Osaka	2021	J1 League	12	2	3	0	2	0	5	0	6	2
Cerezo Osaka	2022	J1 League	0	0	0	0	1	0	ー		1	0
Cerezo Osaka	Total		12	2	3	0	3	0	5	0	23	2
Vegalta Sendai (loan)	2022	J2 League	33	4	1	0	-	-	—		34	4
Career total			158	30	4	0	3	0	5	0	170	30

As of match played 18 July 2020

== International ==
- Japan national under-16 football team
- Japan national under-17 football team
- Japan national under-18 football team
