= Kim Tae-hyeon =

South Korean footballer (born 2000)

Personal information
- Date of birth: 17 September 2000 (age 26)
- Place of birth: Gimpo, South Korea
- Height: 1.87 m (6 ft 2 in)
- Position: Centre-back

Team information
- Current team: Kashima Antlers
- Number: 3

Youth career
- 2015–2018: Tongjin High School

Senior career*
Years	Team	Apps	(Gls)
2019–2023	Ulsan Hyundai	6	(0)
2019	→ Daejeon Citizen (loan)	11	(0)
2020	→ Seoul E-Land (loan)	24	(1)
2022–2023	→ Vegalta Sendai (loan)	53	(2)
2024	Sagan Tosu	26	(0)
2025–	Kashima Antlers	37	(0)

International career^{‡}
2015–2016	South Korea U17	8	(1)
2019	South Korea U20	2	(0)
2019–2023	South Korea U23	11 (Note: Includes one appearance against another KFA team.)	(0)
2025–	South Korea	11	(0)
Medal record
Representing South Korea
Men's football
Asian Games
Gold medal – first place	2022 Hangzhou	Team
AFC U-23 Championship
Gold medal – first place	2020 Thailand
- * Club domestic league appearances and goals as of 24 October 2026 (UTC) ‡ National team caps and goals as of 6 October 2026 (UTC)

- Kim Tae-hyeon
- Hangul: 김태현
- Hanja: 金太鉉
- RR: Gim Taehyeon
- MR: Kim T'aehyŏn
- IPA: [kim.tʰɛ.ɦjʌn]

Kim Tae-hyeon (Korean: 김태현; born 17 September 2000) is a South Korean footballer who plays as a left-footed centre-back for J1 League club Kashima Antlers and the South Korea national team.

== Career ==
On 28 December 2021, Kim joined Vegalta Sendai on a one year loan.

On 10 January 2024, Kim joined Sagan Tosu.

In January 2025, it was announced that Kim would be joining J1 League club Kashima Antlers following a single season at Sagan Tosu.

== International career ==
He was called up by Myung-Bo Hong to join the South Korea 2026 FIFA World Cup squad.

== Career statistics ==
=== Club ===
As of match played 24 October 2026

Appearances and goals by club, season and competition
Club	Season	League			National cup (Note: Includes Korean FA Cup and Emperor's Cup)		League cup (Note: Includes J.League Cup)		Continental		Other		Total	
Club	Season	Division	Apps	Goals	Apps	Goals	Apps	Goals	Apps	Goals	Apps	Goals	Apps	Goals
Ulsan Hyundai	2019	K League 1	0	0	0	0	—		1 (Note: Appearances in the AFC Champions League Elite)	0	—		1	0
Ulsan Hyundai	2021	K League 1	6	0	2	0	—		3	0	—		11	0
Ulsan Hyundai	Total		6	0	2	0	—		4	0	—		12	0
Daejeon Citizen (loan)	2019	K League 2	11	0	0	0	—		—		—		11	0
Seoul E-Land (loan)	2020	K League 2	24	1	1	0	—		—		—		25	1
Vegalta Sendai (loan)	2022	J2 League	30	1	2	0	—		—		—		32	1
Vegalta Sendai (loan)	2023	J2 League	23	1	0	0	—		—		—		23	1
Vegalta Sendai (loan)	Total		53	2	2	0	—		—		—		55	2
Sagan Tosu	2024	J1 League	26	0	3	0	2	0	—		—		31	0
Kashima Antlers	2025	J1 League	30	0	3	0	2	0	—		—		35	0
Kashima Antlers	2026–27	J1 League	7	0	1	0	0	0	2	0	15 (Note: Appearances in J1 100 Year Vision League)	1	25	1
Kashima Antlers	Total		37	0	4	0	2	0	2	0	15	1	60	1
Career total			157	3	12	0	4	0	6	0	15	1	194	4

== Honours ==
Kashima Antlers

- J1 League: 2025

South Korea U23

- AFC U-23 Championship: 2020
- Asian Games: 2022

Individual

- J1 100 Year Vision League (East) Best XI: 2026
