= Hiromu Kamada =

Japanese footballer

Personal information
- Date of birth: 23 June 2001 (age 25)
- Place of birth: Ehime, Japan
- Height: 1.70 m (5 ft 7 in)
- Position: Midfielder

Team information
- Current team: Vegalta Sendai
- Number: 10

Youth career
- Kids FC
- JFA Academy Fukushima
- 2017–2019: Shohei High School

Senior career*
| Years | Team | Apps | (Gls) |
| 2020–2021 | Fukushima United | 53 | (1) |
| 2022- | Vegalta Sendai | 128 | (2) |
- * Club domestic league appearances and goals as of 17 August 2026

Hiromu Kamada (鎌田 大夢, Kamada Hiromu; born 23 June 2001) is a Japanese footballer currently playing as a midfielder for Vegalta Sendai.

== Career statistics ==
=== Club ===
As of 13 November 2022.

| Club | Season | League | | | National Cup | | League Cup | | Other | | Total | |
| Club | Season | Division | Apps | Goals | Apps | Goals | Apps | Goals | Apps | Goals | Apps | Goals |
|---|---|---|---|---|---|---|---|---|---|---|---|---|
| Fukushima United | 2020 | J3 League | 25 | 1 | 0 | 0 | – | | 0 | 0 | 25 | 1 |
| Fukushima United | 2021 | J3 League | 28 | 0 | 0 | 0 | – | | 0 | 0 | 28 | 0 |
| Vegalta Sendai | 2022 | J2 League | 18 | 0 | 2 | 1 | – | | 0 | 0 | 20 | 1 |
| Career total | | | 71 | 1 | 2 | 1 | 0 | 0 | 0 | 0 | 55 | 2 |

== Personal life ==
His elder brother Daichi is also a professional footballer.
