= Takayoshi Ishihara =

Japanese footballer (born 1992)

Takayoshi Ishihara 石原 崇兆
Personal information
- Full name: Takayoshi Ishihara
- Date of birth: November 17, 1992 (age 33)
- Place of birth: Fuji, Shizuoka, Japan
- Height: 1.66 m (5 ft 5 1/2 in)
- Position: Midfielder

Team information
- Current team: Zweigen Kanazawa
- Number: 14

Youth career
- 2005–2010: Shimizu S-Pulse

Senior career*
Years	Team	Apps	(Gls)
2011–2014	Fagiano Okayama	129	(7)
2015–2018	Matsumoto Yamaga	130	(13)
2019–2022	Vegalta Sendai	103	(1)
2023–	Zweigen Kanazawa	92	(2)
- * Club domestic league appearances and goals as of 1 January 2026

Takayoshi Ishihara (石原 崇兆, born November 17, 1992) is a Japanese football player who plays as a midfielder for Zweigen Kanazawa from 2023.

== Career ==
Ishihara begin first youth career with Shimizu S-Pulse as youth team.

Ishihara begin first professional career with Fagiano Okayama in 2011. After four years at Shimizu, he leave from the club in 2014.

On 7 January 2015, Ishihara signed transfer to Matsumoto Yamaga ahead of 2015 season.

On 28 December 2018, Ishihara joined to Vegalta Sendai from 2019. He leave from the club in 2022 after four years at Sendai

On 13 December 2022, Ishihara officially transfer to J2 club, Zweigen Kanazawa for upcoming 2023 season.

== Career statistics ==
Updated to the end 2022 season.

=== Club ===
Club	Season	League			National Cup		League Cup		Other		Total	
Club	Season	Division	Apps	Goals	Apps	Goals	Apps	Goals	Apps	Goals	Apps	Goals
Fagiano Okayama	2011	J2 League	27	1	2	0	-		-		29	1
Fagiano Okayama	2012	J2 League	35	2	2	0	5	0	-		42	2
Fagiano Okayama	2013	J2 League	39	2	1	0	-		-		40	2
Fagiano Okayama	2014	J2 League	28	2	1	0	-		-		29	2
Fagiano Okayama	Total		129	7	6	0	5	0	0	0	140	7
Matsumoto Yamaga	2015	J1 League	16	0	3	0	4	1	-		23	1
Matsumoto Yamaga	2016	J2 League	36	4	1	1	-		-		37	5
Matsumoto Yamaga	2017	J2 League	37	7	2	0	-		-		39	7
Matsumoto Yamaga	2018	J2 League	41	2	0	0	-		-		41	2
Matsumoto Yamaga	Total		130	13	6	1	4	1	0	0	140	15
Vegalta Sendai	2019	J1 League	23	0	2	2	3	0	-		28	2
Vegalta Sendai	2020	J1 League	31	1	-	-	2	0	-		33	1
Vegalta Sendai	2021	J1 League	35	0	1	0	3	0	-		39	0
Vegalta Sendai	2022	J2 League	20	0	1	0	-		-		21	0
Vegalta Sendai	Total		109	1	4	2	8	0	0	0	121	3
Zweigen Kanazawa	2023	J2 League	0	0	0	0	-		-		0	0
Zweigen Kanazawa	Total		0	0	0	0	0	0	0	0	0	0
Career total			368	21	16	3	17	1	0	0	401	25
