= Masato Nakayama =

Japanese footballer

Masato Nakayama 中山 仁斗
Personal information
- Full name: Masato Nakayama
- Date of birth: February 6, 1992 (age 34)
- Place of birth: Amagasaki, Hyōgo, Japan
- Height: 1.80 m (5 ft 11 in)
- Position: Striker

Team information
- Current team: Nara Club
- Number: 27

Youth career
- –2006: Nagasu SC
- 2007–2009: Osaka Sangyo Univ. High School

College career
Years	Team	Apps	(Gls)
2010–2013	Osaka Sangyo University		

Senior career*
Years	Team	Apps	(Gls)
2014–2015	Gainare Tottori	54	(13)
2016	Renofa Yamaguchi	29	(11)
2017–2018	Montedio Yamagata	37	(5)
2019	Júbilo Iwata	14	(2)
2020–2021	Mito HollyHock	73	(25)
2022–2024	Vegalta Sendai	80	(22)
2025–	Nara Club	24	(0)
- * Club domestic league appearances and goals as of 25 August 2026

Masato Nakayama (中山 仁斗, Nakayama Masato; born February 6, 1992) is a Japanese football player who plays for Nara Club.

== Career ==
=== Gainare Tottori ===
On 16 December 2013, Nakayama joined Gainare Tottori.

=== Renofa Yamaguchi ===
On 6 January 2016, Nakayama joined Renofa Yamaguchi. He made his league debut against Giravanz Kitakyushu on 6 March 2016. Nakayama scored his first league goals, a brace, against Roasso Kumamoto on 9 April 2016.

=== Montedio Yamagata ===
On 27 December 2016, Nakayama joined Montedio Yamagata. He made his league debut against Roasso Kumamoto on 12 March 2017. Nakayama scored his first league goal in the 76th minute against Fagiano Okayama on 23 April 2017.

=== Júbilo Iwata ===
On 9 January 2019, Nakayama joined Júbilo Iwata. In his first start for the club, he scored a brace in the J.League Cup on 10 April 2019. Nakayama scored his first league goal for the club, also his first J1 goal, in the 34th minute against Vegalta Sendai on 18 May 2019. On 3 July 2019, he scored a hat-trick against Honda Lock in the Emperor's Cup.

=== Vegalta Sendai ===
On 26 December 2021, Nakayama joined Vegalta Sendai. For his performances during the 2022 season, he was named in the J2 Best XI on 18 January 2023. On 22 November 2024, it was announced that Nakayama would leave the club at the end of the 2024 season.

== Personal life ==
Nakayama's nickname is Gon. Upon signing for Vegalta Sendai, he commented that he looked like a "warlord", a remark that was well received by supporters. He later participated in a collaboration with the Date Bushotai, dressing up as a warlord.

== Career statistics ==
Updated to 28 October 2022.

Appearances and goals by club, season and competition
Club	Season	League			National Cup		League Cup		Other		Total	
Club	Season	Division	Apps	Goals	Apps	Goals	Apps	Goals	Apps	Goals	Apps	Goals
Gainare Tottori	2014	J3 League	23	3	2	1	—		—		25	4
Gainare Tottori	2015	J3 League	31	10	2	0	—		—		32	10
Renofa Yamaguchi	2016	J2 League	29	11	3	0	—		—		32	11
Montedio Yamagata	2017	J2 League	15	2	0	0	—		—		15	2
Montedio Yamagata	2018	J2 League	22	3	4	0	—		—		26	3
Júbilo Iwata	2019	J1 League	14	2	2	6	6	2	—		22	10
Mito HollyHock	2020	J2 League	38	13	—		—		—		38	13
Mito HollyHock	2021	J2 League	35	12	0	0	—		—		35	12
Vegalta Sendai	2022	J2 League	27	14	1	1	—		—		28	15
Career total			234	70	14	8	6	2	0	0	253	80

== Honours ==
Individual

- Emperor's Cup Top Scorer: 2019
- Japan Professional Football Association Award: J2 Best XI (2022)
