= Nacho Fernández (football manager) =

Spanish football manager

Personal information
- Full name: José Ignacio Fernández García
- Date of birth: 5 May 1973 (age 53)
- Place of birth: Gijón, Spain

Team information
- Current team: Chongqing Tonglianglong (assistant coach)

Managerial career
- Years: Team
- 2000–2003: Llano 2000 (youth)
- 2003–2004: Mosconia (assistant)
- 2004–2005: Quintueles
- 2005–2006: Mosconia
- 2007–2008: Mazarrón (assistant)
- 2008: Mazarrón (caretaker)
- 2008–2009: Pájara Playas
- 2015–2016: Alavés (assistant)
- 2016–2017: Alcorcón (assistant)
- 2017: Burgos (caretaker)
- 2018: Burgos (caretaker)
- 2018–2019: Getafe (assistant)
- 2019: Getafe (caretaker)
- 2019–2021: Atlético Madrid B
- 2022: FC Ryukyu
- 2023–2024: Getafe (assistant)
- 2024–2025: Spain Women (assistant)
- 2026–: Chongqing Tonglianglong (assistant)

José Ignacio "Nacho" Fernández Garcia (born 5 May 1973) is a Spanish football manager. He is the current assistant coach of Chinese Super League club Chongqing Tonglianglong.

== Managerial career ==
Born in Gijón, Asturias, Fernández began his managerial career at SD Llano 2000's youth setup. In 2004, after a one-season spell as an assistant manager at CD Mosconia, he was named in charge of Quintueles CF in the regional leagues.

In 2005, Fernández returned to Mosconia, now as first team manager, but left in the following year to work as in the scouting area for UD Las Palmas. In 2007, he joined Mazarrón CF's technical staff, being named interim manager for two matches with Pedro Fabra in March 2008, after the dismissal of Machuca.

In July 2008, Fernández was appointed manager of UD Pájara Playas de Jandía in Segunda División B, but was dismissed the following January. In 2010, he joined AD Alcorcón's backroom staff, being named technical secretary, and remained at the club until 2013, when he moved abroad to join Javier Vidales at Venezuela's Academia Puerto Cabello; he worked as a sporting director at the latter before rejoining Alcorcón in July 2014.

Fernández left Alkor in 2015, and joined José Bordalás' staff at Deportivo Alavés. However, he returned to his previous club in September of the following year, being an assistant manager of Cosmin Contra and Julio Velázquez.

On 3 January 2017, Fernández was named sporting director at Burgos CF. He also worked as an interim first team manager on two occasions before leaving the club in June 2018 and rejoining Bordalás' staff, now at Getafe CF.

In May 2019, Fernández was in charge of two La Liga matches against Girona FC (2–0 win) and FC Barcelona (0–2 loss), as Bordalás was suspended. On 8 July, he returned to managerial duties after being named in charge of Atlético Madrid B.

On 21 January 2026, Fernández was appointed as the assistant coach of Chinese Super League club Chongqing Tonglianglong.
