= Aoi Kudo =

Japanese footballer

Aoi Kudo 工藤 蒼生
Personal information
- Full name: Aoi Kudo
- Date of birth: May 31, 2000 (age 26)
- Place of birth: Miyagi, Japan
- Height: 1.66 m (5 ft 5 1/2 in)
- Position: Midfielder

Team information
- Current team: Vegalta Sendai
- Number: 17

Youth career
- –2009: Kitaroku SSS
- 2010–2018: Vegalta Sendai

College career
Years	Team	Apps	(Gls)
2019–2022	Hannan University		

Senior career*
Years	Team	Apps	(Gls)
2018–	Vegalta Sendai	44	(1)
Medal record
Vegalta Sendai
Runner-up	Emperor's Cup	2018
- * Club domestic league appearances and goals as of 17 August 2026

Aoi Kudo (工藤 蒼生, Kudō Aoi; born May 31, 2000) is a Japanese footballer who plays as a midfielder for Vegalta Sendai.

== Playing career ==
Kudo was born in Miyagi Prefecture on May 31, 2000. He joined J1 League club Vegalta Sendai from youth team in 2018.

At Hannan University, he served as captain.

He will play for Vegalta Sendai from 2023.
