= 2018 Emperor's Cup final =

2018 Emperor's Cup Final
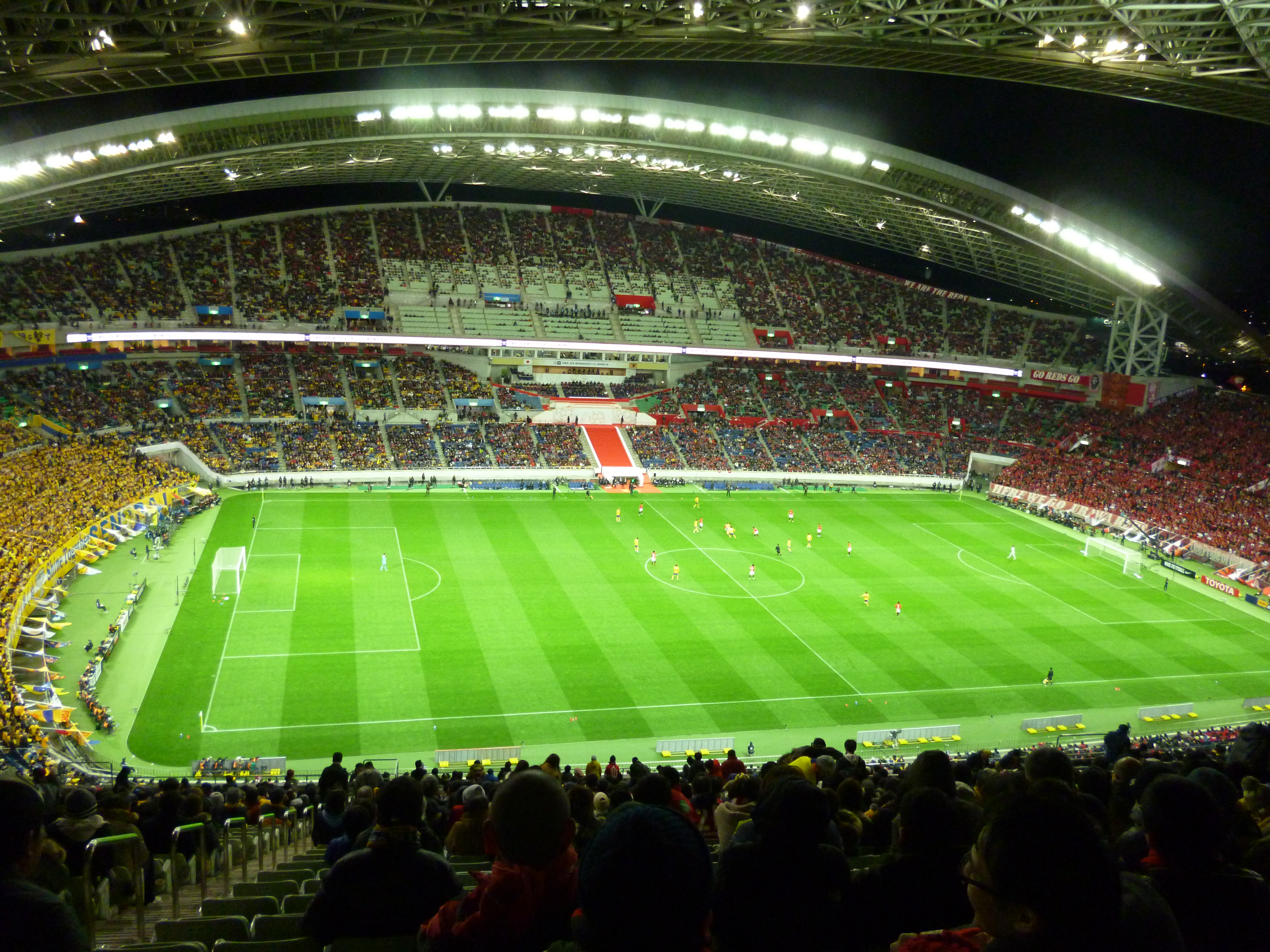
- 2018 Emperor's Cup final at Saitama Stadium 2002
Urawa Reds	Vegalta Sendai
1	0
- Date: December 9, 2018
- Venue: Saitama Stadium 2002, Saitama
- Referee: Yudai Yamamoto
- Attendance: 50,978

2018 Emperor's Cup Final was the 98th final of the Emperor's Cup competition. The final was played at Saitama Stadium 2002 in Saitama on December 9, 2018. Urawa Reds won the championship.

== Match details ==
December 9, 2018

Urawa Reds	1–0	Vegalta Sendai
Ugajin 13'	Report

Saitama Stadium 2002
Attendance: 50,978
Referee: Yudai Yamamoto

Urawa Reds
GK	1	(Japan) Shusaku Nishikawa
DF	31	(Japan) Takuya Iwanami
DF	22	(Japan) Yuki Abe
DF	5	(Japan) Tomoaki Makino
MF	27	(Japan) Daiki Hashioka
MF	16	(Japan) Takuya Aoki
MF	3	(Japan) Tomoya Ugajin
MF	15	(Japan) Kazuki Nagasawa
MF	10	(Japan) Yōsuke Kashiwagi	(substituted off) 62'
FW	9	(Japan) Yuki Muto	(substituted off) 84'
FW	30	(Japan) Shinzo Koroki	(substituted off) 90+5'
Substitutes:
GK	28	(Japan) Haruki Fukushima
DF	26	(Japan) Takuya Ogiwara
DF	46	(Japan) Ryota Moriwaki
MF	29	(Japan) Kai Shibato	(substituted in) 62'
FW	19	(Australia) Andrew Nabbout
FW	20	(Japan) Tadanari Lee	(substituted in) 84'
FW	21	(Slovenia) Zlatan Ljubijankić	(substituted in) 90+5'
Manager:
(Brazil) Oswaldo de Oliveira

Vegalta Sendai
GK	1	(Japan) Daniel Schmidt
DF	13	(Japan) Yasuhiro Hiraoka
DF	27	(Japan) Kazuki Oiwa
DF	6	(Japan) Ko Itakura
MF	34	(Japan) Keiya Shiihashi	(substituted off) 80'
MF	7	(Japan) Hiroaki Okuno
MF	29	(Japan) Shota Kobayashi	(substituted off) 67'
MF	23	(Japan) Yoshihiro Nakano
FW	16	(Japan) Gakuto Notsuda
FW	19	(Japan) Ryo Germain	(substituted off) 67'
FW	11	(Japan) Naoki Ishihara
Substitutes:
GK	21	(Japan) Kentaro Seki
DF	2	(Japan) Katsuya Nagato
MF	10	(North Korea) Ryang Yong-gi
MF	15	(Japan) Shinya Yajima	(substituted in) 80'
MF	17	(Japan) Shingo Tomita
MF	40	(Japan) Kunimitsu Sekiguchi	(substituted in) 67'
FW	20	(Japan) Takuma Abe	(substituted in) 67'
Manager:
(Japan) Susumu Watanabe

== See also ==
- 2018 Emperor's Cup
