= Ryunosuke Sagara =

Japanese footballer

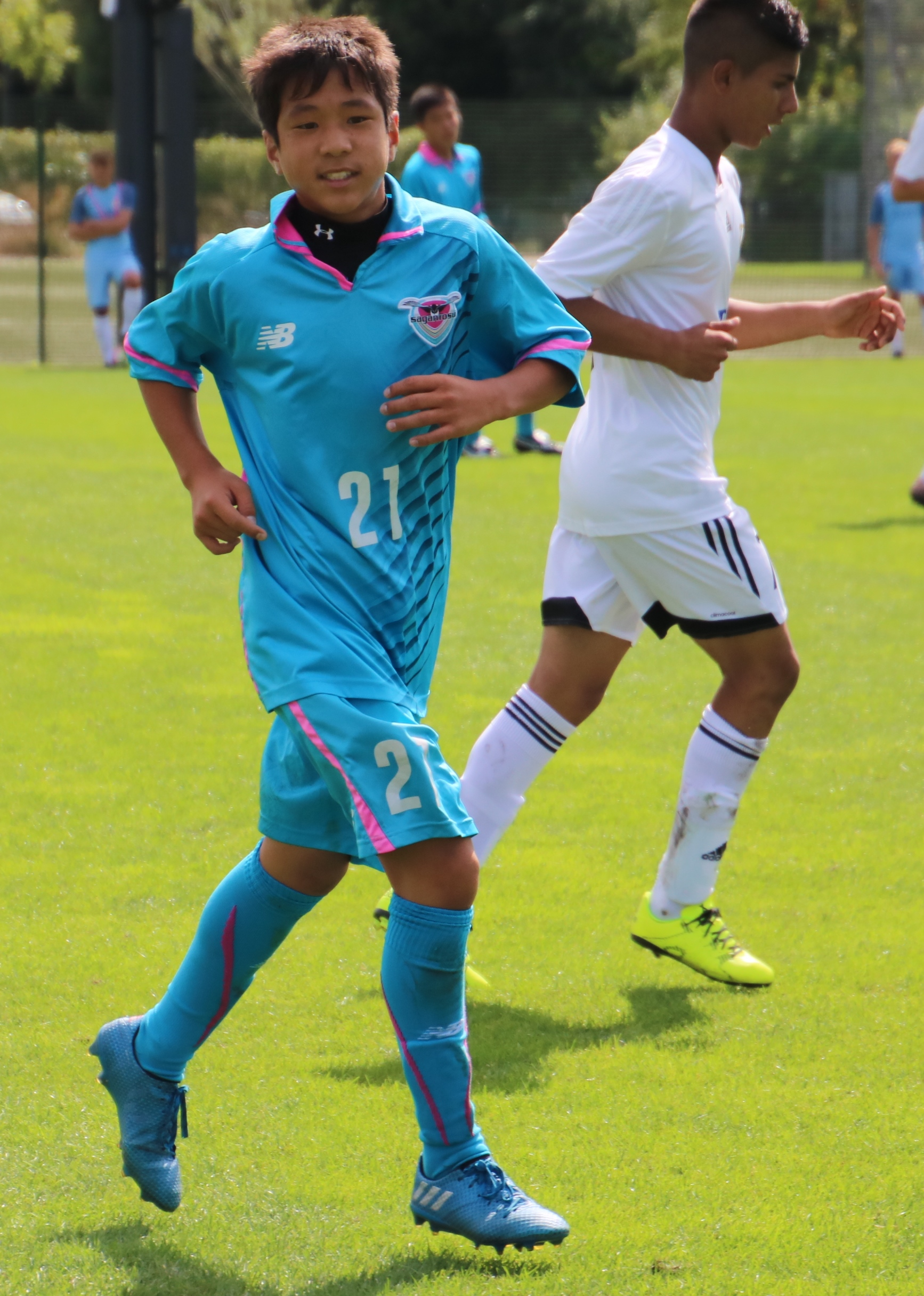

Personal information
- Full name: Ryunosuke Sagara
- Date of birth: 17 August 2002 (age 24)
- Place of birth: Saga, Japan
- Height: 1.72 m (5 ft 8 in)
- Position: Winger

Team information
- Current team: Vegalta Sendai
- Number: 14

Youth career
- FC Naughtys
- –2020: Sagan Tosu

Senior career*
Years	Team	Apps	(Gls)
2020–2022	Sagan Tosu	17	(0)
2023	→ Vegalta Sendai (loan)	23	(7)
2024-	Vegalta Sendai	75	(15)
- * Club domestic league appearances and goals as of 17 August 2026

Ryunosuke Sagara (相良 竜之介, Sagara Ryunosuke; born 17 August 2002) is a Japanese footballer currently playing as a winger for Vegalta Sendai.

== Career statistics ==
=== Club ===
As of 26 November 2022.

Club	Season	League			National Cup		League Cup		Other		Total	
Club	Season	Division	Apps	Goals	Apps	Goals	Apps	Goals	Apps	Goals	Apps	Goals
Sagan Tosu	2020	J1 League	4	0	0	0	1 (Note: Appearances in the J. League Cup)	0	0	0	5	0
Sagan Tosu	2021	J1 League	11	0	0	0	6	0	0	0	17	0
Sagan Tosu	2022	J1 League	2	0	3	1	3	0	0	0	8	1
Sagan Tosu	Total		17	0	3	1	10	0	0	0	30	1
Vegalta Sendai	2023	J2 League										
Career total			17	0	3	1	10	0	0	0	30	1
