= Yuma Obata =

Japanese footballer (born 2001)

Yuma Obata 小畑 裕馬
Personal information
- Date of birth: 7 November 2001 (age 25)
- Place of birth: Miyagi, Japan
- Height: 1.83 m (6 ft 0 in)
- Position: Goalkeeper

Team information
- Current team: Avispa Fukuoka
- Number: 24

Youth career
- Fanaticos
- Avanzare Sendai
- 2017–2019: Vegalta Sendai

Senior career*
Years	Team	Apps	(Gls)
2020–2024	Vegalta Sendai	33	(0)
2025–	Avispa Fukuoka	26	(0)

International career^{‡}
2019	Japan U18	3	(0)
2021	Japan U22	1	(0)
Medal record
Men's football
Representing Japan
Asian Games
Silver medal – second place	2022 Hangzhou	Team
- * Club domestic league appearances and goals as of 12 August 2026 ‡ National team caps and goals as of 10:01, 13 November 2020 (UTC)

Yuma Obata (小畑 裕馬, Obata Yūma; born 7 November 2001) is a Japanese footballer currently playing as a goalkeeper for J1 League club Avispa Fukuoka.

== Career statistics ==
=== Club ===
As of end of 2024 season

Appearances and goals by club, season and competition
Club	Season	League			National Cup		League Cup		Other		Total	
Club	Season	Division	Apps	Goals	Apps	Goals	Apps	Goals	Apps	Goals	Apps	Goals
Japan			League		Emperor's Cup		J. League Cup		Other		Total	
Vegalta Sendai	2019	J1 League	0	0	0	0	0	0	–		0	0
Vegalta Sendai	2020	J1 League	7	0	0	0	1	0	–		8	0
Vegalta Sendai	2021	J1 League	0	0	1	0	4	0	–		5	0
Vegalta Sendai	2022	J2 League	21	0	0	0	–		–		21	0
Vegalta Sendai	2023	J2 League	5	0	1	0	–		–		6	0
Vegalta Sendai	2024	J2 League	0	0	1	0	1	0	0	0	2	0
Vegalta Sendai	Total		33	0	3	0	6	0	0	0	42	0
Avispa Fukuoka	2025	J1 League	0	0	0	0	0	0	–		0	0
Career total			33	0	3	0	6	0	0	0	42	0

=== International ===
- Japan national under-18 football team
  - 2020 AFC U-19 Championship qualification（Group J 1st）
- Japan national under-19 football team
- Japan national under-20 football team
- Japan national under-22 football team
  - 2022 AFC U-23 Asian Cup qualification（Group K 1st）
