= Koji Hachisuka =

Japanese footballer

Koji Hachisuka 蜂須賀 孝治
Personal information
- Full name: Koji Hachisuka
- Date of birth: 20 July 1990 (age 36)
- Place of birth: Ōhira, Tochigi, Japan
- Height: 1.80 m (5 ft 11 in)
- Position: Defender

Youth career
- 2009–2012: Sendai University

Senior career*
Years	Team	Apps	(Gls)
2012–2023	Vegalta Sendai	228	(7)
2024	Blaublitz Akita	22	(0)
Total		250	(7)
Medal record
Vegalta Sendai
Runner-up	J1 League	2012
Runner-up	Emperor's Cup	2018
- * Club domestic league appearances and goals

Koji Hachisuka (蜂須賀 孝治, born 20 July 1990) is a Japanese former footballer who played as a defender. He spent 12 seasons at Vegalta Sendai, making 279 appearances for the club before finishing his career at Blaublitz Akita in 2024.

== Career statistics ==
=== Club ===
Appearances and goals by club, season and competition
Club	Season	League			National cup (Note: Includes Emperor's Cup)		League cup (Note: Includes J.League Cup)		Continental		Total	
Club	Season	Division	Apps	Goals	Apps	Goals	Apps	Goals	Apps	Goals	Apps	Goals
Vegalta Sendai	2012	J.League Division 1	1	0	0	0	0	0	0	0	1	0
Vegalta Sendai	2013	J.League Division 1	20	0	1	0	2	0	5 (Note: Appearances in AFC Champions League Elite)	0	28	0
Vegalta Sendai	2014	J.League Division 1	2	0	0	0	0	0	0	0	2	0
Vegalta Sendai	2015	J1 League	21	0	3	0	5	1	0	0	29	1
Vegalta Sendai	2016	J1 League	9	0	0	0	5	0	0	0	14	0
Vegalta Sendai	2017	J1 League	29	0	1	0	8	0	0	0	38	0
Vegalta Sendai	2018	J1 League	28	4	4	0	4	2	0	0	36	6
Vegalta Sendai	2019	J1 League	32	0	1	0	2	0	0	0	35	0
Vegalta Sendai	2020	J1 League	20	2	0	0	1	0	0	0	21	2
Vegalta Sendai	2021	J1 League	32	1	1	0	6	0	0	0	39	1
Vegalta Sendai	2022	J2 League	14	0	1	0	0	0	0	0	15	0
Vegalta Sendai	2023	J2 League	20	0	1	0	0	0	0	0	21	0
Vegalta Sendai	Total		228	7	13	0	33	3	5	0	279	10
Blaublitz Akita	2024	J2 League	22	0	1	0	3	0	–		26	0
Career total			250	7	14	0	36	3	5	0	305	10

== Honours ==
Vegalta Sendai

- J1 League Runners-Up (1): 2012
- Emperor's Cup Runners-Up (1): 2018
