= Ryunosuke Sugawara =

Japanese footballer

Ryunosuke Sugawara 菅原 龍之助
Personal information
- Full name: Ryunosuke Sugawara
- Date of birth: July 28, 2000 (age 26)
- Place of birth: Miyagi, Japan
- Height: 1.80 m (5 ft 11 in)
- Position: Forward

Team information
- Current team: FC Osaka (On loan from Vegalta Sendai)
- Number: 29

Youth career
- Minato SSS
- –2018: Vegalta Sendai

College career
Years	Team	Apps	(Gls)
2019–2022	Sanno Institute of Management		

Senior career*
Years	Team	Apps	(Gls)
2023–	Vegalta Sendai	21	(2)
2025	→ Tochigi SC (loan)	20	(0)
2026–	→ FC Osaka (loan)	17	(3)
Medal record
Vegalta Sendai
Runner-up	Emperor's Cup	2018
- * Club domestic league appearances and goals as of 18 August 2026

Ryunosuke Sugawara (菅原 龍之助, Sugawara Ryūnosuke; born July 28, 2000) is a Japanese football player for FC Osaka.

== Career statistics ==
=== Club ===
As of 25 December 2022.

Club	Season	League			National Cup		League Cup		Other		Total	
Club	Season	Division	Apps	Goals	Apps	Goals	Apps	Goals	Apps	Goals	Apps	Goals
Vegalta Sendai	2018	J1 League	0	0	–		1	0	–		1	0
Vegalta Sendai	2023	J2 League	–	–	–	–	–		–	–	–	–
Career total			–	–	–	–	–	–	–	–	–	–
