= Ryoma Kida =

Japanese footballer

Personal information
- Full name: Ryoma Kida
- Date of birth: 12 August 1997 (age 29)
- Place of birth: Chiba, Japan
- Height: 1.72 m (5 ft 8 in)
- Position: Midfielder

Team information
- Current team: Montedio Yamagata
- Number: 10

Youth career
- Takayanagi FC
- –2012: Canarinho FC
- 2013–2015: JEF United Chiba

College career
Years	Team	Apps	(Gls)
2016–2019	Senshu University		

Senior career*
Years	Team	Apps	(Gls)
2020–2021	V-Varen Nagasaki	32	(4)
2021–2024	Vegalta Sendai	107	(16)
2024-	Montedio Yamagata	78	(9)
- * Club domestic league appearances and goals as of 13 August 2026

Ryoma Kida (氣田 亮真, Kida Ryoma; born 12 August 1997) is a Japanese footballer currently playing as a midfielder for Montedio Yamagata.

== Career statistics ==
=== Club ===
As of 4 December 2022.

Club	Season	League			National Cup		League Cup		Other		Total	
Club	Season	Division	Apps	Goals	Apps	Goals	Apps	Goals	Apps	Goals	Apps	Goals
V-Varen Nagasaki	2020	J2 League	22	2	ー		ー		ー		22	2
Vegalta Sendai	2021	J1 League	29	3	0	0	5	1	ー		34	4
Vegalta Sendai	2022	J2 League	33	6	2	0	ー		ー		35	6
Vegalta Sendai	2023	J2 League					ー		ー			
Career total			84	11	2	0	5	1	0	0	91	12

== Honours ==
Individual

- J.League Monthly MVP: 2022(May)
