= Wataru Tanaka =

Japanese footballer

Personal information
- Date of birth: 23 September 2000 (age 26)
- Place of birth: Gunma, Japan
- Height: 1.69 m (5 ft 7 in)
- Position: Midfielder

Team information
- Current team: Kagoshima United
- Number: 7

Youth career
- –2012: FC Ojima Junior
- 2013–2015: Maebashi SC
- 2016–2018: Kiryu Daiichi High School

Senior career*
Years	Team	Apps	(Gls)
2019–2021	Vegalta Sendai	8	(0)
2021–2022	→ Renofa Yamaguchi FC (loan)	55	(6)
2023–2026	Montedio Yamagata	60	(2)
2024	Kagoshima United (loan)	33	(1)
2026–	Kagoshima United	2	(0)
- * Club domestic league appearances and goals as of 18 August 2026

Wataru Tanaka (田中 渉, Tanaka Wataru; born 23 September 2000) is a Japanese footballer currently playing as a midfielder for Kagoshima United.

== Personal life ==
Tanaka is the brother of fellow footballer Hiromu Tanaka.

== Career statistics ==
=== Club ===
As of 20 July 2022.

Club	Season	League			National Cup		League Cup		Continental		Other		Total	
Club	Season	Division	Apps	Goals	Apps	Goals	Apps	Goals	Apps	Goals	Apps	Goals	Apps	Goals
Vegalta Sendai	2019	J1 League	1	0	2 (Note: Appearances in the Emperor's Cup)	0	3 (Note: Appearances in the J. League Cup)	1	–		0	0	6	1
Vegalta Sendai	2020	J1 League	7	0	0	0	2	2	–		0	0	9	2
Vegalta Sendai	2021	J1 League	0	0	0	0	2	0	–		0	0	1	0
Renofa Yamaguchi (loan)	2021	J2 League	17	1	0	0	–		–		0	0	17	1
Renofa Yamaguchi (loan)	2022	J2 League	25	2	2	0	–		–		0	0	27	2
Career total			50	3	4	0	7	3	0	0	0	0	61	6
