= Akira Ito (footballer) =

Japanese footballer

Akira Ito 伊藤 彰
Personal information
- Full name: Akira Ito
- Date of birth: 19 September 1972 (age 54)
- Place of birth: Niiza, Saitama, Japan
- Height: 1.76 m (5 ft 9 in)
- Position: Midfielder

Team information
- Current team: V-Varen Nagasaki (coach)

Youth career
- 1988–1990: Bunan High School
- 1991–1994: Kokushikan University

Senior career*
Years	Team	Apps	(Gls)
1995–2001	Kawasaki Frontale	161	(35)
2002–2003	Omiya Ardija	81	(11)
2004	Sagan Tosu	41	(4)
2005–2006	Tokushima Vortis	82	(10)
Total		365	(60)

Managerial career
- 2017: Omiya Ardija
- 2019–2021: Ventforet Kofu
- 2022: Júbilo Iwata
- 2022–2023: Vegalta Sendai
- 2024–2025: Zweigen Kanazawa
- 2025–: V-Varen Nagasaki (coach)
Medal record
Kawasaki Frontale
Runner-up	J.League Cup	2000
- * Club domestic league appearances and goals

Akira Ito (伊藤 彰, Ito Akira; born September 19, 1972) is a Japanese football manager and former player. He is the currently coach of J2 League club V-Varen Nagasaki.

== Playing career ==
Ito was born in Niiza on September 19, 1972. After graduating from Kokushikan University, he joined Japan Football League club Fujitsu (later Kawasaki Frontale) in 1995. He played many matches as offensive midfielder and forward from first season. Although his opportunity to play decreased in 1997, he became a regular player in 1998 and the club was promoted to J2 League from 1999. In 1999, the club won the champions and was promoted to J1 League from 2000. In 2000, although the club gained many players and his opportunity to play decreased, the club won the 2nd place J.League Cup. However the club results were bad in league competition and the club was relegated to J2 in a year. Although he played many matches as regular player in 2001, he was released from the club end of 2001 season. In 2002, he moved to J2 club Omiya Ardija in based in his local Saitama Prefecture. He played many matches as regular player in 2 seasons. In 2004, he moved to J2 club Sagan Tosu and played many matches as side midfielder. In 2005, he moved to newly was promoted to J2 League club, Tokushima Vortis. He played many matches as side midfielder in 2 seasons and retired end of 2006 season.

== Coaching career ==
After retirement, Ito started coaching career at Omiya Ardija in 2007. He coached for youth team until 2015. In 2016, he became a top team coach under manager Hiroki Shibuya. In May 2017, the club results were bad and Shibuya was sacked and Ito became a new manager as Shibuya successor. However the club result did not improve and Ito was sacked in November. In 2018, he signed with Ventforet Kofu and became a coach. In 2019, he became a manager.

On 11 December 2023, Ito was announce official appointment of J3 relegated club, Zweigen Kanazawa from 2024 season.

== Career statistics ==
Appearances and goals by club, season and competition
Club	Season	League			Emperor's Cup		J.League Cup		Total	
Club	Season	Division	Apps	Goals	Apps	Goals	Apps	Goals	Apps	Goals
Fujitsu	1995	JFL	26	4	0	0	-		26	4
Fujitsu	1996	JFL	25	9	4	3	-		29	12
Kawasaki Frontale	1997	JFL	8	0	0	0	-		8	0
Kawasaki Frontale	1998	JFL	25	11	3	2	3	0	31	13
Kawasaki Frontale	1999	J2 League	31	7	3	4	2	0	36	11
Kawasaki Frontale	2000	J1 League	13	2	0	0	5	1	18	3
Kawasaki Frontale	2001	J2 League	33	2	4	3	3	0	40	5
Omiya Ardija	2002	J2 League	43	4	4	2	-		47	6
Omiya Ardija	2003	J2 League	38	7	2	1	-		40	8
Sagan Tosu	2004	J2 League	41	4	2	0	-		43	4
Tokushima Vortis	2005	J2 League	40	9	0	0	-		40	9
Tokushima Vortis	2006	J2 League	42	1	1	0	-		43	1
Career total			365	60	23	15	13	1	401	76

== Managerial statistics ==
As of the start for 2025 season.

Team	From	To	Record				
Team	From	To	G	W	D	L	Win %
Omiya Ardija	2017		23	7	8	8	30.43
Ventforet Kofu	2019	2021	132	61	41	30	46.21
Júbilo Iwata	2022		28	7	7	14	25.00
Vegalta Sendai	2022	2023	33	10	10	13	30.30
Zweigen Kanazawa	2024	present	38	13	11	14	34.21
Total			254	98	77	79	38.58

• Statistics including J1, J2, J3 Leagues, J.League Cup and Emperor's Cup results.
