= 2022 J2 League =

24th season of J2 League

J2 League
- Season: 2022
- Dates: 19 February – 23 October
- Champions: Albirex Niigata; 2nd J2 title 2nd D2 title
- Promoted: Albirex Niigata; Yokohama FC
- Relegated: FC Ryukyu; Iwate Grulla Morioka
- Champions League: Ventforet Kofu
- Matches: 462
- Goals: 1,136 (2.46 per match)
- Top goalscorer: Koki Ogawa (26 goals)
- Biggest home win: Tokushima Vortis 5–0 Iwate Grulla Morioka (20 April 2022)
- Biggest away win: Thespakusatsu Gunma 1–6 Renofa Yamaguchi (24 September 2022)
- Highest scoring: FC Ryukyu 2–5 Tokyo Verdy (30 March 2022); Albirex Niigata 4−3 Tokyo Verdy (8 May 2022); Ventforet Kofu 5–2 FC Ryukyu (6 August 2022); Roasso Kumamoto 3–4 Yokohama FC (23 October 2022)
- Longest winning run: 6 matches Tokyo Verdy
- Longest unbeaten run: 19 matches Tokushima Vortis
- Longest winless run: 12 matches Blaublitz Akita
- Longest losing run: 7 matches Iwate Grulla Morioka; Ventforet Kofu
- Highest attendance: 32,979; Albirex Niigata 3–0 Vegalta Sendai (8 October 2022)
- Lowest attendance: 608; FC Ryukyu 0–1 Blaublitz Akita (3 September 2022)
- Total attendance: 2,318,829
- Average attendance: 5,019

The 2022 J2 League, also known as the 2022 Meiji Yasuda J2 League (Japanese: 2022 明治安田生命J2リーグ, Hepburn: 2022 Meiji Yasuda Seimei J2 Rīgu) for sponsorship reasons, was the 24th season of the J2 League, the second-tier Japanese professional league for association football clubs, since its establishment in 1999.

== Clubs ==
Locations of the 2022 J2 League teams
Greater Tokyo Area J2 League teams

Club name	Hometown	Stadium	Capacity	Previous season rank	License
Albirex Niigata	Niigata & Seiro, Niigata	Denka Big Swan Stadium	42,300	J2 (6th)	J1
Blaublitz Akita	Akita	Soyu Stadium	20,125	J2 (13th)	J1
Fagiano Okayama	All cities/towns in Okayama (Note: centering on Okayama, Kurashiki, Tsuyama)	City Light Stadium	20,000	J2 (11th)	J1
Iwate Grulla Morioka	All cities/towns in Iwate	Iwagin Stadium & Kitakami Stadium	4,946	J3 (2nd)	J1
JEF United Chiba	Chiba & Ichihara, Chiba	Fukuda Denshi Arena	18,500	J2 (8th)	J1
Machida Zelvia	Machida, Tokyo	Machida Athletic Stadium	10,600	J2 (5th)	J1
Mito HollyHock	Cities/towns in Ibaraki (Note: Mito, Hitachinaka, Kasama, Naka, Omitama, Ibaraki, Shirosato, Oarai, Tokai)	K's denki Stadium Mito	12,000	J2 (10th)	J1
Montedio Yamagata	All cities/towns in Yamagata (Note: centering on Yamagata, Tendo, Tsuruoka)	ND Soft Stadium	20,315	J2 (7th)	J1
Oita Trinita	Ōita Prefecture	Showa Denko Dome Oita	40,000	J1 (18th)	J1
Omiya Ardija	Saitama, Saitama	NACK5 Stadium Omiya	15,500	J2 (16th)	J1
Renofa Yamaguchi	All cities/towns in Yamaguchi	Yamaguchi Ishin Park Stadium	20,000	J2 (15th)	J1
Roasso Kumamoto	Kumamoto, Kumamoto	Egao Kenko Stadium	32,000	J3 (1st)	J1
FC Ryukyu	All cities/towns in Okinawa (Note: centering on Okinawa)	Tapic Kenso Hiyagon Stadium	25,000	J2 (9th)	J1
Thespakusatsu Gunma	All cities/towns in Gunma (Note: centering on Kusatsu and Maebashi)	Shoda Shoyu Stadium Gunma	15,253	J2 (18th)	J1
Tochigi SC	Utsunomiya, Tochigi	Kanseki Stadium Tochigi	25,244	J2 (14th)	J1
Tokushima Vortis	Tokushima Prefecture	Pocarisweat Stadium	20,441	J1 (17th)	J1
Tokyo Verdy	All cities/towns in Tokyo	Ajinomoto Stadium	49,970	J2 (12th)	J1
V-Varen Nagasaki	All cities/towns in Nagasaki Prefecture (Note: centering on Nagasaki and Isahaya)	Nagasaki Athletic Stadium	20,246	J2 (4th)	J1
Vegalta Sendai	Miyagi Prefecture	Yurtec Stadium Sendai	19,694	J1 (19th)	J1
Ventforet Kofu	All cities/towns in Yamanashi Prefecture (Note: centering on Kofu and Nirasaki)	Yamanashi Chuo Bank Stadium	17,000	J2 (3rd)	J1
Yokohama FC	Kanagawa Prefecture	Mitsuzawa Stadium	15,046	J1 (20th)	J1
Zweigen Kanazawa	All cities/towns in Ishikawa (Note: centering on Kanazawa, Nonoichi, Kahoku, Tsubata, Tsubata)	Ishikawa Kanazawa Stadium	20,000	J2 (17th)	J1

=== Personnel and kits ===
Club	Manager	Captain	Kit manufacturer
Albirex Niigata	(Japan) Rikizo Matsuhashi	(Japan) Yuto Horigome	(Germany) Adidas
Blaublitz Akita	(Japan) Ken Yoshida	(Japan) Shuto Inaba	(Brazil) ATHLETA
Fagiano Okayama	(Japan) Takashi Kiyama	(Japan) Junki Kanayama	(Brazil) Penalty
Iwate Grulla Morioka	(Japan) Yutaka Akita	(Japan) Yusuke Muta	(Spain) Kelme
JEF United Chiba	(South Korea) Yoon Jong-hwan	(Japan) Daisuke Suzuki	(Denmark) Hummel
Machida Zelvia	(Serbia) Ranko Popović	(Japan) Taiki Hirato	(Japan) SVOLME
Mito HollyHock	(Japan) Tadahiro Akiba	(Japan) Ryo Niizato	(Japan) soccer junky
Montedio Yamagata	(Australia) Peter Cklamovski	(Japan) Shuto Minami	(Brazil) Penalty
Oita Trinita	(Japan) Takahiro Shimotaira	(Japan) Hokuto Shimoda	(Germany) Puma
Omiya Ardija	(Japan) Naoki Soma	(Japan) Yuta Mikado	(United States) Under Armour
Renofa Yamaguchi	(Japan) Yoshihiro Natsuka	(Japan) Joji Ikegami	(Brazil) Finta
Roasso Kumamoto	(Japan) Takeshi Oki	(Japan) So Kawahara	(Germany) Puma
FC Ryukyu	(Spain) Nacho Fernández	(Japan) Ryohei Okazaki	(Japan) sfida
Thespakusatsu Gunma	(Japan) Tsuyoshi Otsuki	(Japan) Hajime Hosogai	(Spain) Kelme
Tochigi SC	(Japan) Yu Tokisaki	(Japan) Yuki Nishiya	(Brazil) ATHLETA
Tokushima Vortis	(Spain) Dani Poyatos	(Japan) Hidenori Ishii	(Japan) Mizuno
Tokyo Verdy	(Japan) Hiroshi Jofuku	(Japan) Tomohiro Taira	(Brazil) ATHLETA
V-Varen Nagasaki	(Brazil) Fábio Carille	(Brazil) Caio César	(England) Umbro
Vegalta Sendai	(Japan) Akira Ito	(North Korea) Ryang Yong-gi	(Germany) Adidas
Ventforet Kofu	(Japan) Tatsuma Yoshida	(Japan) Sho Araki	(Japan) Mizuno
Yokohama FC	(Japan) Shuhei Yomoda	(Japan) Tatsuya Hasegawa	(Japan) Soccer Junky
Zweigen Kanazawa	(Japan) Masaaki Yanagishita	(Japan) Tomonobu Hiroi	(Denmark) Hummel

=== Managerial changes ===
Team	Outgoing	Manner	Exit date		Position in table	Incoming	Incoming date		Ref.
Team	Outgoing	Manner	Announced on	Departed on	Position in table	Incoming	Announced on	Arrived on	Ref.
Omiya Ardija	Masahiro Shimoda	Sacked	26 May 2022	26 May 2022	20th	Naoki Soma	26 May 2022	28 May 2022	
FC Ryukyu	Tetsuhiro Kina	Sacked	8 June 2022	8 June 2022	22nd	Kazuki Kuranuki (caretaker)	9 June 2022	9 June 2022	
V-Varen Nagasaki	Hiroshi Matsuda	Sacked	12 June 2022	12 June 2022	5th	Takeo Harada (caretaker)	12 June 2022	12 June 2022	
V-Varen Nagasaki	Takeo Harada	End of caretaker spell	12 June 2022	1 July 2022	TBD	Fábio Carille	12 June 2022	2 July 2022	
FC Ryukyu	Kazuki Kuranuki	End of caretaker spell	13 June 2022	13 June 2022	22nd	Nacho Fernández	13 June 2022	14 June 2022	
Tokyo Verdy	Takafumi Hori	Sacked	13 June 2022	13 June 2022	14th	Hiroshi Jofuku	13 June 2022	14 June 2022	
Vegalta Sendai	Masato Harasaki	Sacked	6 September 2022	6 September 2022	4th	Akira Ito	6 September 2022	6 September 2022	

== Foreign players ==
As of 2022 season, there are no more restrictions on a number of signed foreign players, but clubs can only register up to five foreign players for a single match-day squad. Players from J.League partner nations (Thailand, Vietnam, Myanmar, Malaysia, Cambodia, Singapore, Indonesia and Qatar) are exempt from these restrictions.

- Players name in **bold** indicates the player is registered during the midseason transfer window.
- Player's name in italics indicates the player has Japanese nationality in addition to their FIFA nationality, or is exempt from being treated as a foreign player due to having been born in Japan and being enrolled in, or having graduated from school in the country.

Club	Player 1	Player 2	Player 3	Player 4	Player 5	Player 6	Player 7	Player 8	Left midseason
Albirex Niigata	(Australia) Thomas Deng	(Peru) Kazuyoshi Shimabuku	(Portugal) Alexandre Guedes	(Russia) Ippei Shinozuka					
Blaublitz Akita									
Fagiano Okayama	(Brazil) Tiago Alves	(South Korea) Han Eui-kwon	(Australia) Mitchell Duke	(Australia) Stefan Mauk	(Netherlands) Jordy Buijs				(South Korea) Yu Yong-hyeon
Iwate Grulla Morioka	(Brazil) Brenner	(Brazil) **Cristiano**	(Brazil) Lucas Morelatto	(South Korea) Kim Jong-min	(South Korea) Jang Hyun-soo	(Philippines) Paul Tabinas	(North Korea) Han Yong-thae	(Nigeria) Kenneth Otabor	
JEF United Chiba	(Brazil) Daniel	(Brazil) **Ricardo Lopes**	(Brazil) Tiago Leonço	(South Korea) Jang Min-gyu					(Brazil) Saldanha
Machida Zelvia	(Brazil) Dudu	(Brazil) Vinícius Araújo	(North Korea) Jong Tae-se						
Mito HollyHock	(Germany) **Leonard Brodersen**	(Philippines) Jefferson Tabinas							
Montedio Yamagata	(Brazil) Dellatorre	(Portugal) Tiago Alves							
Oita Trinita	(Brazil) Eduardo Neto	(Brazil) Matheus Pereira	(Brazil) Samuel						
Omiya Ardija									
Renofa Yamaguchi	(Brazil) Renan								
Roasso Kumamoto	(Brazil) Leo Kenta	(Brazil) Thales							
FC Ryukyu	(Brazil) **Kelvin**	(Spain) **Álex Barrera**	(Costa Rica) Danny Carvajal	(North Korea) Ri Yong-jik	(Thailand) Sittichok Paso	(Vietnam) Phạm Văn Luân	(Vietnam) Vũ Hồng Quân	(Ghana) **Sadam Sulley**	(Brazil) Vinícius Faria
Thespakusatsu Gunma									
Tochigi SC	(Brazil) Juninho	(Spain) Carlos Gutiérrez							(Turkey) Ömer Tokaç
Tokushima Vortis	(Brazil) Cacá	(Brazil) **Elsinho**	(South Korea) Rio Hyon	(Nigeria) Oriola Sunday	(Norway) Mushaga Bakenga	(Spain) José Aurelio Suárez			
Tokyo Verdy	(Brazil) Matheus Vidotto	(Indonesia) Pratama Arhan	(Chile) Byron Vásquez						
V-Varen Nagasaki	(Brazil) Caio César	(Brazil) Cristiano	(Brazil) Edigar Junio	(Brazil) **Kaique**	(Brazil) **Clayson**	(Colombia) Víctor Ibarbo			
Vegalta Sendai	(Brazil) Felippe Cardoso	(Brazil) Foguinho	(South Korea) Kim Tae-hyeon	(North Korea) Ryang Yong-gi	(Argentina) Leandro Desábato	(Serbia) Nedeljko Stojišić			
Ventforet Kofu	(Brazil) Renato	(Brazil) Willian Lira	(Brazil) **Eduardo Mancha**	(Brazil) **Foguete**	(Brazil) **Getúlio**	(Brazil) **Igor Sartori**			(Brazil) Bruno Paraíba
Yokohama FC	(Brazil) Gabriel	(Brazil) Kléber	(Brazil) Rhayner	(Brazil) Saulo Mineiro	(Brazil) **Marcelo Ryan**	(Brazil) **Mateus Moraes**	(Germany) Svend Brodersen		(Brazil) Felipe Vizeu
Zweigen Kanazawa	(South Korea) **Taiga Son**								

== League table ==
Pos	Team	Pld	W	D	L	GF	GA	GD	Pts	Promotion or relegation
1	Albirex Niigata (C, P)	42	25	9	8	73	35	+38	84	Promotion to the J1 League
2	Yokohama FC (P)	42	23	11	8	66	49	+17	80	Promotion to the J1 League
3	Fagiano Okayama	42	20	12	10	61	42	+19	72	Qualification for the promotion play-offs
4	Roasso Kumamoto	42	18	13	11	58	48	+10	67	Qualification for the promotion play-offs
5	Oita Trinita	42	17	15	10	62	52	+10	66	Qualification for the promotion play-offs
6	Montedio Yamagata	42	17	13	12	62	40	+22	64	Qualification for the promotion play-offs
7	Vegalta Sendai	42	18	9	15	67	59	+8	63	
8	Tokushima Vortis	42	13	23	6	48	35	+13	62	
9	Tokyo Verdy	42	16	13	13	62	55	+7	61	
10	JEF United Chiba	42	17	10	15	44	42	+2	61	
11	V-Varen Nagasaki	42	15	11	16	50	54	−4	56	
12	Blaublitz Akita	42	15	11	16	39	46	−7	56	
13	Mito HollyHock	42	14	12	16	47	46	+1	54	
14	Zweigen Kanazawa	42	13	13	16	56	69	−13	52	
15	Machida Zelvia	42	14	9	19	51	50	+1	51	
16	Renofa Yamaguchi	42	13	11	18	51	54	−3	50	
17	Tochigi SC	42	11	16	15	32	40	−8	49	
18	Ventforet Kofu (X)	42	11	15	16	47	54	−7	48	Qualification for the AFC Champions League group stage (Note: Qualified as the 2022 Emperor's Cup winners.)
19	Omiya Ardija	42	10	13	19	48	64	−16	43	
20	Thespakusatsu Gunma	42	11	9	22	36	57	−21	42	
21	FC Ryukyu (R)	42	8	13	21	41	65	−24	37	Relegation to J3 League
22	Iwate Grulla Morioka (R)	42	9	7	26	35	80	−45	34	Relegation to J3 League

Source: Meiji Yasuda J2 League, J.League Data Site
Rules for classification: 1) Points; 2) Goal difference; 3) Goals scored; 4) Head-to-head points; 5) Head-to-head goal difference; 6) Head-to-head goal scored; 7) Fair-play points.
(C) Champions; (P) Promoted; (R) Relegated; (X) Qualified for the AFC Champions League.

== Promotion–relegation playoffs ==
First round 30 October
J2 (3)	Fagiano Okayama	0
J2 (6)	Montedio Yamagata	3
J2 (4)	Roasso Kumamoto	2
J2 (5)	Oita Trinita	2

Second round 6 November
J2 (6)	Montedio Yamagata	2
J2 (4)	Roasso Kumamoto	2

Final; 13 November
J1 (16)	Kyoto Sanga	1
J2 (4)	Roasso Kumamoto	1

== Season statistics ==
As of 31 October 2022

=== Goal contributions ===
==== Top scorers ====
Rank	Player	Club	Goals
1	(Japan) Koki Ogawa	Yokohama FC	26
2	(Brazil) Tiago Alves	Fagiano Okayama	16
3	(Japan) Masato Nakayama	Vegalta Sendai	14
3	(Japan) Toshiki Takahashi	Roasso Kumamoto	14
5	(Japan) Masamichi Hayashi	Zweigen Kanazawa	13
5	(Japan) Ryoga Sato	Tokyo Verdy	13

==== Clean sheets ====
Rank	Player	Club	Clean sheets
1	(Japan) Ryosuke Kojima	Albirex Niigata	18
2	(Japan) Masaaki Goto	Montedio Yamagata	17
3	(Japan) Shota Arai	JEF United Chiba	14
4	(Spain) José Aurelio Suárez	Tokushima Vortis	13
4	(Japan) Shuhei Kawata	Tochigi SC	13
4	(Japan) Yudai Tanaka	Blaublitz Akita	13

=== Discipline ===
==== Player ====
- Most yellow cards: 9
  - (Japan) Kota Fukatsu (Machida Zelvia)
- Most red cards: 2
  - (Spain) Carlos Gutiérrez (Tochigi SC)

==== Club ====
- Most yellow cards: 67 (Iwate Grulla Morioka)
- Most red cards: 4 (Mito HollyHock)

== Awards ==
=== Monthly awards ===
Month	Manager of the Month		Monthly MVP		Goal of the Month		References
Month	Manager	Club	Player	Club	Player	Club	References
February/March	(Japan) Shuhei Yomoda	Yokohama FC	(Japan) Koki Ogawa	Yokohama FC	(Brazil) Tiago Alves	Fagiano Okayama	
April	(Japan) Masato Harasaki	Vegalta Sendai	(Japan) Ryoma Kida	Vegalta Sendai	(Japan) Kota Yamada	Montedio Yamagata	
May	(Japan) Rikizo Matsuhashi	Albirex Niigata	(Japan) Shunsuke Mito	Albirex Niigata	(Japan) Kazuma Yamaguchi	Machida Zelvia	
June	(Japan) Takashi Kiyama	Fagiano Okayama	(Japan) Koki Ogawa	Yokohama FC	(Japan) Hiroki Noda	Montedio Yamagata	
July	(Japan) Takeshi Oki	Roasso Kumamoto	(Brazil) Edigar Junio	V-Varen Nagasaki	(Japan) Naohiro Sugiyama	Roasso Kumamoto	
August	(Japan) Takashi Kiyama	Fagiano Okayama	(Netherlands) Jordy Buijs	Fagiano Okayama	(Japan) Wataru Tanaka	Renofa Yamaguchi	
September	(Japan) Takeshi Oki	Roasso Kumamoto	(Japan) Hiroya Matsumoto	Zweigen Kanazawa	(Japan) Kazuma Takai	Renofa Yamaguchi	
October/November	(Japan) Hiroshi Jofuku	Tokyo Verdy	(Japan) Koki Ogawa	Yokohama FC	(Japan) Ryotaro Ito	Albirex Niigata	

== See also ==
- Japan Football Association (JFA)
- 2022 Nadeshiko League
- 2022 Blaublitz Akita season
- 2022 Mito HollyHock season
- 2022 Vegalta Sendai season
