= Vegalta Sendai =

Association football club in Japan

Vegalta Sendai ベガルタ仙台
- Full name: Vegalta Sendai
- Nicknames: Vega, Brummell
- Short name: VEG
- Founded: 1988; 38 years ago
- Ground: Yurtec Stadium Sendai (Izumi-ku, Sendai)
- Capacity: 19,694
- Chairman: Yasushi Kitabatake
- Manager: Yoshiro Moriyama
- League: J2 League
- 2025: J2 League, 7th of 20
- Website: vegalta.co.jp
Home colours	Away colours

Vegalta Sendai (ベガルタ仙台, Begaruta Sendai) is a Japanese professional football club based in Sendai, Miyagi Prefecture. They currently play in J2 League, the Japanese second tier of professional football.

Vegalta won the J2 League title in the 2009 season, and then went on to win the "J2/J3 100-Year Vision League" held in 2026 during the season transition period, securing two major titles.

== History ==
=== Foundation and early development (1988–1998) ===
Founded in 1988 as Tohoku Electric Power Co., Inc. Soccer Club, the company team of Tohoku Electric Power, Vegalta Sendai joined the J-League in 1999 after playing a few seasons in the JFL, with the nickname Brummell Sendai, to which they had been promoted in 1994 from the Tohoku Regional League. In the mid-1990s, the club began transitioning into a community-based professional club as part of the expanding structure of the J.League. In 1999, the club adopted the name Vegalta Sendai as a homage to the famous Tanabata festival in Sendai and joined the newly established J2 League.

=== Promotion to J1 and early top-flight years (2001–2003) ===
Vegalta achieved promotion to the J1 League in 2001 after finishing near the top of the J2 standings. The promotion marked the first time the club competed in Japan’s top division.

Vegalta performed strongly in its debut season and secured a respectable mid-table finish. However, the club went back down to J2 League due to the inconsistent performance.

=== Rebuilding and return to J1 (2004–2019) ===
Following relegation, Vegalta spent several years rebuilding in the J2 League while strengthening its squad and youth development system. The club gradually improved its performances and became a strong promotion contender.

In 2009, Vegalta won the J2 League title thus securing promotion back to the J1 League for the 2010 season.

In 2011, despite the earthquake and tsunami, Vegalta achieved their highest position up to that time, 4th place in the top division.

In 2012, despite leading the table for most of the season, Sanfrecce Hiroshima's challenge proved too strong, and losing the penultimate week game to relegation battler Albirex Niigata cost them the title, rendering them runners-up in the league which is Vegalta best-ever league finish in the top flight division.

In 2018, Vegalta reached the final of the 2018 Emperor's Cup, however, lost 1–0 to Urawa Red Diamonds.

=== Recent seasons (2020–present) ===
After twelve years spent in the J1 League, Vegalta returned to the J2 in 2022, after being relegated from the J1 at the end of 2021. After finishing in seventh place in the 2022 J2 League, thus failing to reach the promotion play-offs. Ryang Yong-gi, a symbol of Sendai, retired at the end of the 2023 season.

For the 2024 season, Yoshiro Moriyama, who has a track record of developing players at Sanfrecce Hiroshima's training age group and the U17 Japan National Team, was appointed as Manager.

On June 6, 2026, they won the J2/J3 100-Year Vision League, securing a major title for the first time in 17 years.

== Team image ==
=== Name origin ===
The name “Vegalta” is derived from the names of two stars in the Summer Triangle asterism—Vega and Altair—a reference to the famous Tanabata festival held annually in Sendai. The names of the two celestial stars of the Tanabata legend, Vega and Altair were combined to form Vegalta.

=== Supporters ===
As with most football clubs, fans in Sendai sing and dance during matches. However, most of the songs used by fans from other clubs are avoided due to the more eclectic set. Club themes sung before each game are Take Me Home, Country Roads, and during the game. Toy Dolls, Blitzkrieg Bop and other Kiss and Twisted Sister songs.

Since Sendai is the hometown of Hirohiko Araki, who wrote JoJo's Bizarre Adventure, fans often wave flags with the same motifs of characters portrayed in Araki's manga.

=== Rivalries ===
==== Michinoku Derby ====
Vegalta's traditional rivals are Montedio Yamagata from Yamagata Prefecture. The two have been rivals since meeting in the Tohoku Football League in 1991. Among the Tohoku derbies, this match is famous as the Michinoku derby.

==== Tohoku Derby ====
This is the derby played by the Tohoku region teams, currently the most important match is that of Vegalta Sendai and Montedio Yamagata. Other teams included in this classic include Blaublitz Akita, Iwate Grulla Morioka, Iwaki FC.

=== Mascot ===
- VEGATTA (Brother)
  - He has won "the J League mascot general election" many times and is quite popular.
  - The eagle, which is also used in the club emblem as a symbol of victory in Greek mythology, is associated with the Aquila constellation, to which Hikoboshi (Altair) belongs, which is the origin of the club's name. The name was decided by public submission. Vegatta's SNS (BLOG, Twitter), which is updated daily, is loved and popular among soccer fans in Japan, as the mascot loves mischief, and is by some fans, hard to believe it is a mascot.
- LTAANA (Sister)
  - From the Sendai summer tradition "Sendai Tanabata", which is the origin of the team name, "Luta" for Vega (Orihime) and Altair (Hikoboshi), and "Tana" for Tanabata, it was named as a girlish name by combining "na", on a 7 August, which is the date of the event and the birthday. Sometimes she tweet with [#ルターナ] (LTAANA written phonetically on Katakana) on Sendai's official Twitter.
  - When Vegalta wins any match, she expresses her joy on Twitter.

=== Cheerleaders ===
- The Vegalta Cheerleaders mainly support "Vegalta Sendai", participate in many events, and continue to work as a cheering group for people who are doing their best in the area. She has the longest history as a cheerleader for a professional sports team in Sendai, and has been active since 2003.

== Stadium ==
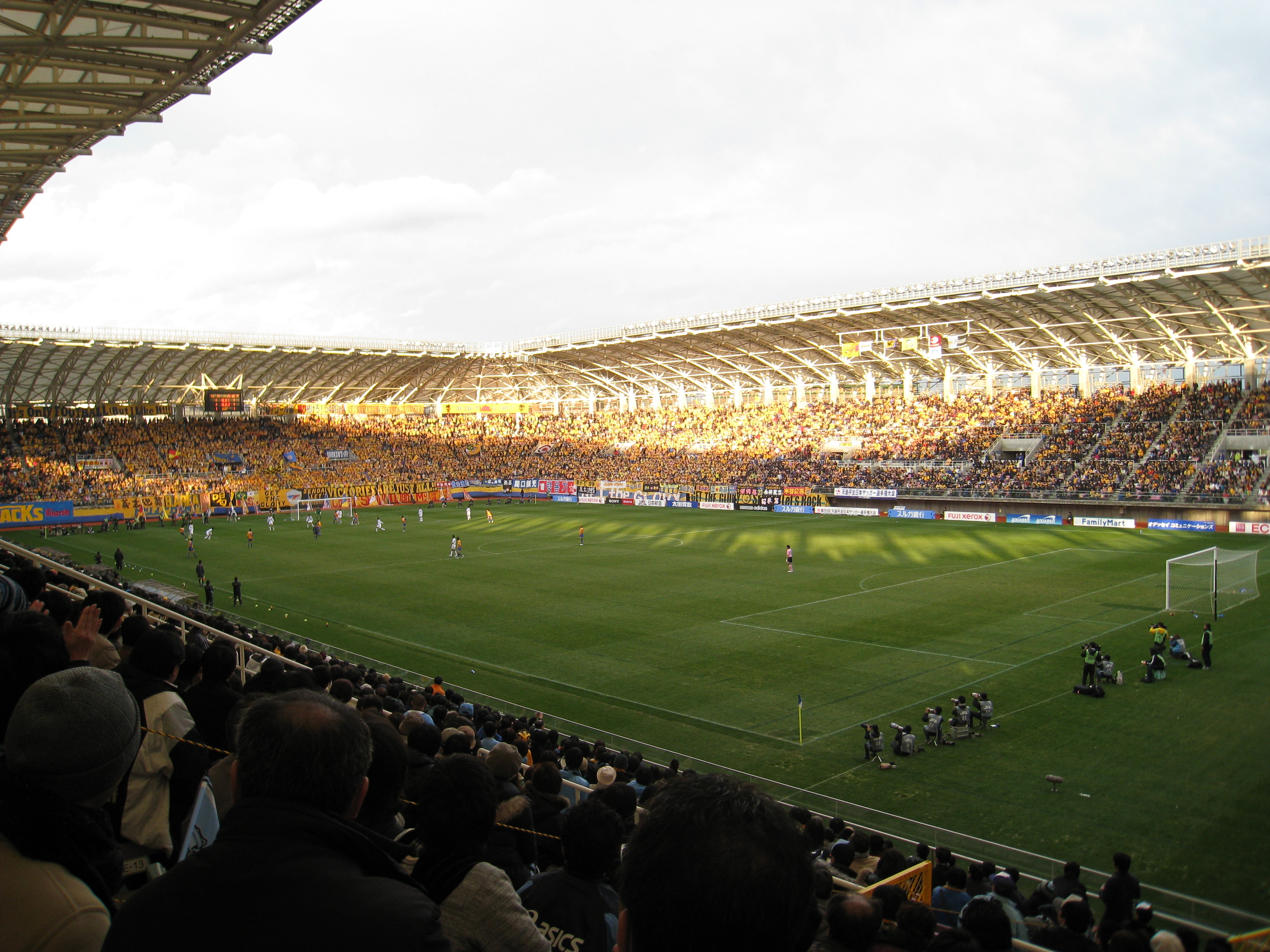
Yurtec Stadium Sendai

Vegalta plays its home matches at Yurtec Stadium Sendai, a football-specific stadium located in Izumi-ku, Sendai. Opened in 1997, the stadium has a seating capacity of around 19,134 spectators and is known for its compact design, with stands positioned close to the pitch, creating an intense matchday atmosphere. The stadium has served as the club’s primary home ground since Vegalta joined the professional structure of the J.League. Its intimate atmosphere and passionate supporters make it one of the most recognizable football venues in the Tōhoku region.

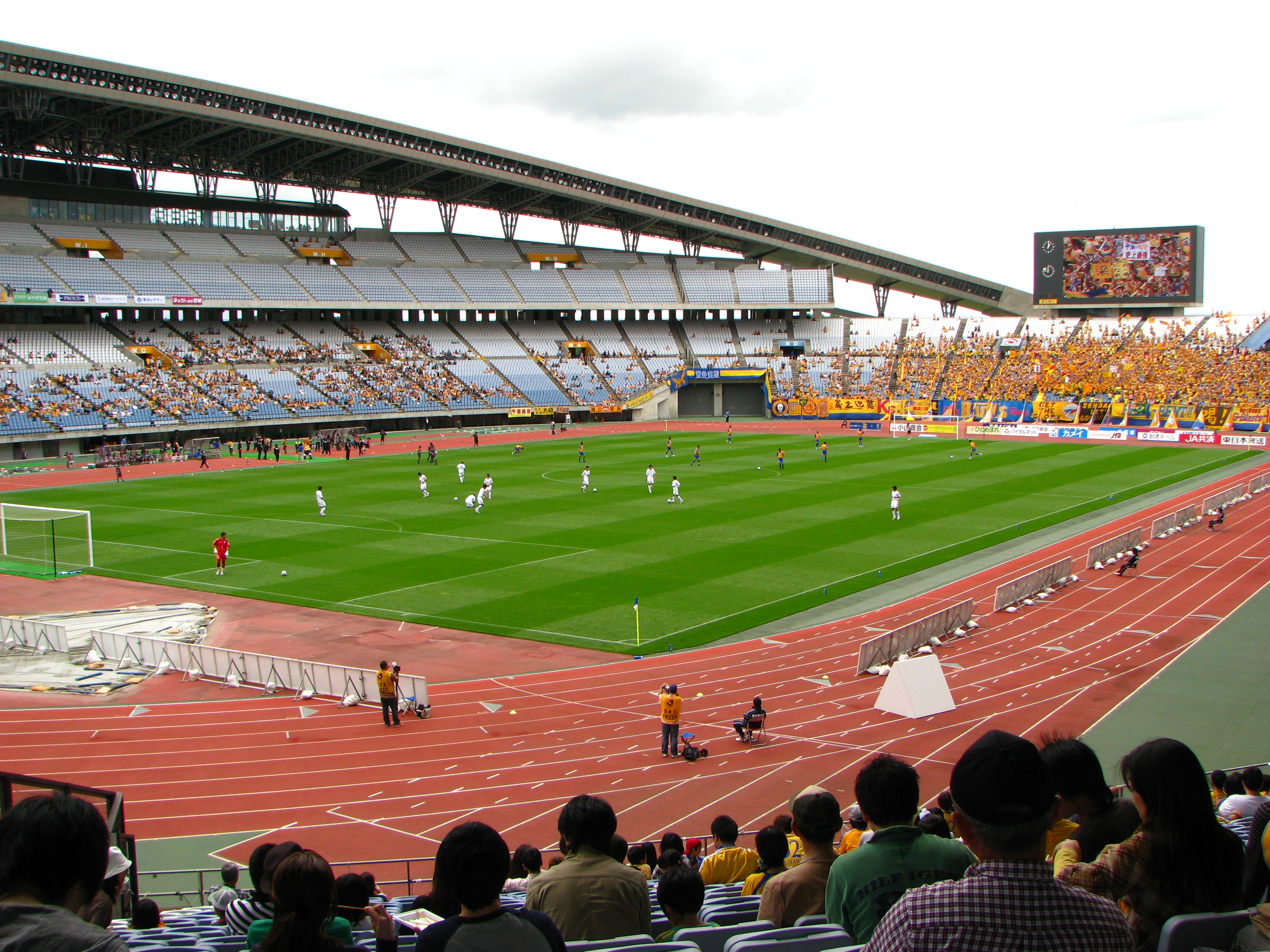
Miyagi Stadium

In addition to Yurtec Stadium Sendai, the club occasionally uses the Miyagi Stadium. a much larger multi-purpose stadium located in the town of Rifu, just outside Sendai. It is typically used for selected high-profile matches and major event. Opened in 2000, the venue has a capacity of over 49,000 and was one of the stadiums used during the 2002 FIFA World Cup where It was also used by the Italian national football team as their basecamp during the tournament.

Due to its significantly larger capacity, Miyagi Stadium is sometimes used for high-profile fixtures, major events, and matches expected to attract larger crowds. While Yurtec Stadium Sendai remains the club’s main and traditional home ground, Miyagi Stadium serves as an alternative venue that allows the club to accommodate bigger audiences for important games.

== Kit suppliers and shirt sponsors ==
=== Kit evolution ===
Home - 1st kits
1999-2001	2002-2003	2004-2006	2007-2008	2009-2010
2011-2012	2013-2014	2015	2016	2017
2018	2019	2020	2021	2022
2023	2024	2025 -		

Away - 2nd kits
1999-2001	2002-2003	2004-2006	2007-2008	2009-2010
2011-2012	2013-2014	2015	2016	2017
2018	2019	2020	2021	2022
2023	2024	2025 -		

Other - 3rd kits
2009; 15th Anniversary	2014; 20th Anniversary	2016 Great East Japan Earthquake 5th Anniversary Reconstruction	2017 SUMMER	2018 SUMMER
2019; 25th Anniversary	2021; Limited	2022; Limited	2024; 30th Anniversary	2025; Limited

== Players ==
=== First-team squad ===
As of 20 October 2026.

Note: Flags indicate national team as defined under FIFA eligibility rules; some limited exceptions apply. Players may hold more than one non-FIFA nationality.

No.	Pos.	Nation	Player
1	GK	JPN	Daiki Hotta
2	DF	JPN	Sena Igarashi
3	DF	JPN	Masayuki Okuyama
4	MF	JPN	Azuri Yutani
5	DF	JPN	Masahiro Sugata
6	MF	JPN	Renji Matsui
7	FW	JPN	Motohiko Nakajima
8	MF	JPN	Hidetoshi Takeda
9	FW	JPN	Ko Miyazaki
10	MF	JPN	Hiromu Kamada
11	FW	JPN	Kokoro Kobayashi
13	DF	JPN	Shuri Kudo ^{DSP}
14	MF	JPN	Ryunosuke Sagara
15	MF	JPN	Sota Minami
17	MF	JPN	Aoi Kudo
18	FW	JPN	Tsubasa Umeki
19	DF	BRA	Mateus Moraes
20	FW	JPN	Yu Nakada

No.	Pos.	Nation	Player
22	DF	JPN	Ryota Takada
23	MF	JPN	Keito Arita
24	DF	JPN	Taiga Nagai
26	MF	JPN	Sota Yokoyama
27	MF	JPN	Hiroto Iwabuchi
29	GK	JPN	Koki Matsuzawa
30	FW	JPN	Minto Nishimaru
33	GK	JPN	Akihiro Hayashi
34	FW	JPN	Ayumu Furuya
37	MF	JPN	Yota Sugiyama
40	FW	JPN	Takumi Yasuno
41	GK	JPN	Ippei Takahashi
42	DF	JPN	Hayata Ishii
44	DF	JPN	Shion Inoue
47	FW	JPN	Shunta Araki
55	DF	KOR	Han Ho-gang
77	MF	JPN	Jo Ogawa ^{DSP}
80	MF	JPN	Ren Asakura

=== Out on loan ===
Note: Flags indicate national team as defined under FIFA eligibility rules; some limited exceptions apply. Players may hold more than one non-FIFA nationality.

No.	Pos.	Nation	Player
—	GK	JPN	Riku Umeda (at FC Osaka)
—	DF	JPN	Tetsuya Chinen (at Tochigi City)
—	MF	JPN	Manato Kudo (at Kochi United)

No.	Pos.	Nation	Player
—	FW	BRA	Gustavo (at Botafogo)
—	FW	JPN	Ryunosuke Sugawara (at FC Osaka)

== Management and staff ==
For the 2026 season.

Position	Name
Manager	(Japan) Yoshiro Moriyama
First-team coach	(Japan) Koichiro Katafuchi (Japan) Akira Konno (Japan) Yōsuke Nishi
Goalkeeper coach	(Japan) Motoki Ueda
Physical coach	(Japan) Makoto Muraoka
Analyst & coach	(Japan) Takuma Deguchi
Chief trainer	(Japan) Yakuya Matsuda
Trainer	(Japan) Tomoki Takeda (Japan) Taisuke Ikoma
Physiotherapist	(Japan) Masaaki Taira
Interpreter	(Brazil) Rodrigo Simões
Competent	(Japan) Shinya Naganuma
Deputy officer	(Japan) Yutaro Miura (Japan) Hiroki Ito

== Honours ==
Type	Honours	Titles	Season
League	J2/J3 100 Year Vision League	1	2026
League	J2 League	1	2009
League	Tohoku Soccer League	1	1994
League	Japanese Regional Football League Competition	1	1984

Bold is for those competition that are currently active.

== Records and statistics ==
As of 25 April 2026.

Top 10 all-time appearances
Rank	Player	Years	Club appearance
1	(North Korea) Ryang Yong-gi	2004–2019, 2022–2023	617
2	(Japan) Shingo Tomita	2005–2022	518
3	(Japan) Naoki Sugai	2003–2018	442
4	(Japan) Naoki Chiba	1996–2010	430
5	(Japan) Kunimitsu Sekiguchi	2004–2012, 2018–2021	413
6	(Japan) Takuto Hayashi	2007–2013	284
7	(Japan) Koji Hachisuka	2012–2023	279
8	(Japan) Takayuki Nakahara	2003–2014	230
9	(Japan) Yasuhiro Hiraoka	2016–2022	224
10	(Japan) Jiro Kamata	2010–2015	220

Top 10 all-time goalscorer
Rank	Player	Club appearance	Total goals
1	(North Korea) Ryang Yong-gi	617	83
2	(Brazil) Marcos	73	56
3	(Brazil) Wilson	162	51
4	(Japan) Shingo Akamine	163	48
5	(Japan) Naoki Sugai	442	43
6	(Japan) Yuki Nakashima	201	38
7	(Japan) Hisato Satō	81	33
8	(Japan) Takayuki Nakahara	230	31
9	(Japan) Takuma Nishimura	143	30
10	(Japan) Kunimitsu Sekiguchi	413	30

- Biggest wins: 11–0 vs Matsuyama University (3 November 1996)
- Heaviest defeats: 0–7 vs Urawa Red Diamonds (7 April 2017)
- Youngest ever debutant: Manato Kudo ~ 16 years 11 months 11 days old (On 18 April 2018 vs Albirex Niigata)
- Oldest ever player: (North Korea) Ryang Yong-gi ~ 41 years 10 months 5 days old (On 12 November 2023 vs Machida Zelvia)
- Youngest goal scorers: Kenta Miyawaki ~ 17 years 3 months 14 days old (On 18 April 2018 vs Albirex Niigata)
- Oldest goal scorers: (Serbia) Slobodan Dubajić ~ 37 years 6 months 8 days old (On 27 August 2000 vs Mito HollyHock)

== Award winners ==
At the end of the J2/J3 100-Year Vision League.

- J. League Best XI
  - (Brazil) Wilson (2012)
- Valuable Player Award
  - (Japan) Takuto Hayashi (2011, 2012)
  - (Japan) Makoto Kakuda (2011, 2012)
  - (Japan) Jiro Kamata (2011, 2012)
  - (Japan) Taikai Uemoto (2012)
  - (Japan) Naoki Sugai (2012)
  - (Japan) Shingo Akamine (2012)
  - (North Korea) Ryang Yong-gi (2012)
  - (Mozambique) Simão Mate (2019)
- Individual Fair Play Award
  - (Japan) Yuichi Nemoto (2003)
  - (North Korea) Ryang Yong-gi (2011)
  - (Japan) Akihiro Hayashi (2024、2025)
- J.League Monthly MVP
  - (Japan) Shingo Akamine (May 2014)
  - (Mozambique) Simão Mate (June 2019)
  - (Japan) Ryoma Kida(April 2022)
  - (Japan) Motohiko Nakajima (May 2024)
  - (Japan) Hiromu Kamada (April 2026)
- Monthly Best Manager
  - (Japan) Susumu Watanabe (June 2019)
  - (Japan) Masato Harasaki (May 2022)
  - (Japan) Yoshiro Moriyama (May 2024、May·June·September 2025)
- Monthly Best Goal
  - (North Korea) Ryang Yong-gi (2015)
  - (Brazil) Crislan (2017)
- J.League Cup Award
  - (Japan) Takuma Nishimura (2017)
- TAG Heuer YOUNG GUNS Award
  - (Japan) Takuma Nishimura (2017)
  - (Japan) Ko Itakura (2018)
- J.League Cup Top Scorer
  - (Brazil) Crislan: 2017)
- J2 League Top Scorer
  - (Brazil) Marcos (2001)
  - (Brazil) Borges (2006)
- Meritorious Player Award
  - (Japan) Norio Omura (2009)
  - (Japan) Atsushi Yanagisawa (2015)
  - (Japan) Hisato Satō (2021)
  - (Japan) Makoto Kakuda (2022)
  - (Japan) Naoki Ishihara (2022)
  - (Japan) Yoshiki Takahashi (2022)
  - (Japan) Shingo Tomita (2023)
  - (Japan) Shingo Akamine (2023)
  - (North Korea) Ryang Yong-gi (2024)
  - (Japan) Takuto Hayashi (2024)

== Managerial history ==
Manager	Period	Honours
(Japan) Takekazu Suzuki	1 July 1990–31 December 1995	– 1994 Tohoku Soccer League
(Japan) Choei Sato	1 January 1996–31 December 1996	
(Slovenia) Branko Elsner	1 February 1997–31 December 1997	
(Japan) Toshiya Miura	1 January 1998–31 January 1998	
(Japan) Takekazu Suzuki (2)	1 February 1998–24 July 1999	
(Japan) Hidehiko Shimizu	27 July 1999–14 September 2003	
(Japan) Hajime Ishii	15 September 2003–20 September 2003	
(Slovenia) Zdenko Verdenik	21 September 2003–31 December 2004	
(Japan) Satoshi Tsunami	1 January 2005–30 November 2005	
(Brazil) Joel Santana	1 December 2005–31 December 2006	
(Japan) Tatsuya Mochizuki	1 January 2007–31 December 2007	
(Japan) Makoto Teguramori	1 February 2008–14 November 2013	– 2009 J2 League
(Australia) Graham Arnold	14 November 2013–9 April 2014	
(Japan) Susumu Watanabe	10 April 2014–31 January 2020	
(Japan) Takashi Kiyama	1 February 2020–31 January 2021	
(Japan) Makoto Teguramori (2)	1 February 2021–22 November 2021	
(Japan) Masato Harasaki	23 November 2021–5 September 2022	
(Japan) Akira Ito	6 September 2022–12 July 2023	
(Japan) Takafumi Hori	13 July 2023–13 November 2023	
(Japan) Yoshiro Moriyama	1 January 2024–present	

== Notable players and coaches ==
- (Brazil) Edmar 1995–1997
- (Germany) Pierre Littbarski 1996–1997
- (Germany) Frank Ordenewitz 1996
- (Slovenia) Branko Elsner 1997
- (Japan) Teruo Iwamoto 2001–2003
- (Japan) Hajime Moriyasu 2002–2003
- (Slovenia) Zdenko Verdenik 2003–2004
- (North Korea) Ryang Yong-gi 2004–2019, 2022–2023
- (North Macedonia) Goce Sedloski 2004
- (Brazil) Joel Santana 2006
- (Brazil) Thiago Neves 2006
- (Brazil) Humberlito Borges 2006
- (Japan) Makoto Teguramori 2008–2013, 2021
- (Japan) Atsushi Yanagisawa 2011–2014
- (Australia) Graham Arnold 2014
- (Australia) (Serbia) Danny Vukovic 2014
- (New Zealand) (Scotland) Michael McGlinchey 2014
- (Japan) Daniel Schmidt 2014–2019
- (Japan) Takuma Nishimura 2015–2018, 2020–2021
- (Japan) Ko Itakura 2018
- (Mozambique) Simão Mate Junior 2019–2021

=== International convention ===
National Team

World Cup

- 2018
  - (Australia) Danny Vukovic (2014)
- 2022
  - (Japan) Daniel Schmidt (2014–2019)
  - (Japan) Ko Itakura (2018)
  - (Australia) Danny Vukovic

World Cup (Manager)

- 2022
  - (Japan) Hajime Moriyasu (2002–2003)
  - (Australia) Graham Arnold (2014)

FIFA Confederations Cup

- 2017
  - (Australia) Danny Vukovic
  - (New Zealand) Michael McGlinchey (2014)

AFC Asian Cup

- 2011/2015
  - (North Korea) Ryang Yong-gi (2004–2019, 2022-)
- 2019
  - (Japan) Daniel Schmidt
    ※Runner up
  - (Australia) Danny Vukovic

AFC Asian Cup (Manager)

- 2019
  - (Japan) Hajime Moriyasu
  - (Australia) Graham Arnold

Copa América

- 2019
  - (Japan) Ko Itakura

OFC Nations Cup

- 2016
  - (New Zealand) Michael McGlinchey
    ※Winner

EAFF E-1 Football Championship

- 2015
  - (Japan) Yuji Rokutan (2015–2016)
- 2022
  - (Japan) Takuma Nishimura (2015–2018, 2020–2021)
  - (Japan) Hajime Moriyasu
    ※Winner

Under National Team

Summer Olympics (U-23)

- 2020
  - (Japan) Ko Itakura

Summer Olympics (U-23 Manager)

- 2016
  - (Japan) Makoto Teguramori (Manager)
- 2020
  - (Australia) Graham Arnold

AFC U-23 Asian Cup

- 2016
  - (Japan) Makoto Teguramori
    ※Winner
- 2020
  - (Australia) Graham Arnold
    ※3rd place

Asian Games (U-23)

- 2018
  - (Japan) Ko Itakura
    ※Runner up

Asian Games (U-23 Manager)

- 2014
  - (Japan) Makoto Teguramori

Toulon Tournament (U-22)

- 2019
  - (Japan) Keiya Shiihashi (2016–2020)
    ※Runner up, Best XI

FIFA U-20 World Cup (Manager)

- 2023
  - (South Korea) Kim Eun-jung (2003)

== Best Match ==
① and ② were selected as "that game I want to see again" on the J League official YouTube channel, and 2 was also selected as "10 Best Matches" by J Chronicle Best. ② was also selected as the "Best Match" of the J30 Best Awards.

=== J Chronicle Best ===
This is a project to select the J.League "Best Eleven", "Best Goal" and "Best Match" over the past 20 years. A project held in 2013 to commemorate the 20th anniversary of the Japan Professional Soccer League. The mentioned two game is often featured as a legendary game in each media.

=== J30 BEST AWARDS ===
A project to select the "MVP", "Best Eleven", "Best Goal", "Best Match", and "Best Scene" of the J League over the past 30 years. An award hosted by the J.League to commemorate the 30th anniversary of the establishment of the J.League in 2023.

Even in "Soccer Digest" (Japan's famous football media), the two were selected as "the best 3 selected J.League matches" by the reporter in charge of Sendai. Sendai's Yoshiaki Ota, who scored the equalizing goal against Kawasaki, said, "I think it was a goal that everyone worked together, including the thoughts of my teammates."

*The notation of the match card and the stadium where the match was held is at the time of the match.

	Game	Date/Stadium	Overview	Match data
①	2001 J League Division 2 Round 44 Kyoto Purple Sanga FC 0-1 Vegalta Sendai	November 18, 2001 Takebishi Stadium Kyoto	The long-awaited J1 first promotion match. Head-to-head competition between leader Kyoto and 3rd place Sendai in the final round. The first promotion to J1 as a club in the Tohoku region is decided.	Official record
②	2011 J League Division 1 Round 7 Kawasaki Frontale 1-2 Vegalta Sendai	April 23, 2011 Kawasaki Todoroki Stadium	The first match after the suspension of the league match due to the Great East Japan Earthquake. Sendai, who suffered severe damage to the club itself, came from behind to win. Recorded the club's first victory with Todoroki Stadium.	Official record

== Season by season record ==
Champions	Runners-up	Third place	Promoted	Relegated

League														J.League Cup	Emperor's Cup
Season	League	Tier	Teams	Pos.	P	W (OTW / PKW)	D	L (OTL)	F	A	GD	Pts	Attendance	J.League Cup	Emperor's Cup
Brummell Sendai
1995	Former JFL	2	16	15th	30	9	-	21	40	79	-39	27			2nd round
1996	Former JFL	2	16	6th	30	18	-	12	67	52	15	56			3rd round
1997	Former JFL	2	16	8th	30	12 (1 / 2)	-	15	37	43	-6	40		Group stage	2nd round
1998	Former JFL	2	16	7th	30	1 (5 / 3)	-	12	55	53	2	43		Group stage	4th round
Vegalta Sendai
1999	J2	2	10	9th	36	7 (3)	4	18 (4)	30	58	-28	31	7,470	1st round	2nd round
2000	J2	2	11	5th	40	15 (4)	2	15 (4)	60	69	-9	55	8,885	1st round	1st round
2001	J2	2	12	2nd	44	24 (3)	5	9 (3)	78	56	22	83	14,011	1st round	3rd round
2002	J1	1	16	13th	30	9 (2)	1	18	40	57	-17	32	21,862	Group stage	4th round
2003	J1	1	16	15th	30	5	9	16	31	56	-25	24	21,646	Group stage	3rd round
2004	J2	2	12	6th	44	15	14	15	62	66	-4	59	16,198	Not eligible	4th round
2005	J2	2	12	4th	44	19	11	14	66	47	19	68	15,934	Not eligible	4th round
2006	J2	2	13	5th	48	21	14	13	75	43	32	77	14,453	Not eligible	4th round
2007	J2	2	13	4th	48	24	13	11	72	54	18	83	14,685	Not eligible	3rd round
2008	J2	2	15	3rd	42	18	16	8	62	47	15	70	14,080	Not eligible	4th round
2009	J2	2	18	1st	51	32	10	9	87	39	48	106	12,951	Not eligible	Semi final
2010	J1	1	18	14th	34	10	9	15	40	46	-6	39	17,332	Quarter final	2nd round
2011	J1	1	18	4th	34	14	14	6	39	25	14	56	15,656	2nd round	4th round
2012	J1	1	18	2nd	34	15	12	7	59	43	16	57	16,603	Quarter final	3rd round
2013	J1	1	18	13th	34	11	12	11	41	38	3	45	14,866	Quarter final	Quarter final
2014	J1	1	18	14th	34	9	11	14	35	50	-15	38	15,173	Group stage	2nd round
2015	J1	1	18	14th	34	9	8	17	44	48	-4	35	14,907	Group stage	Quarter final
2016	J1	1	18	12th	34	13	4	17	39	48	-9	43	15,050	Group stage	2nd round
2017	J1	1	18	12th	34	11	8	15	44	53	-9	41	14,746	Semi final	2nd round
2018	J1	1	18	11th	34	13	6	15	44	54	-10	45	15,408	Round of 16	Runners up
2019	J1	1	18	11th	34	12	5	17	38	45	-7	41	14,971	Play-off stage	4th round
2020 †	J1	1	18	17th	34	6	10	18	36	61	-25	28	4,163	Group stage	Not eligible
2021	J1	1	20	19th	38	5	13	20	31	62	-31	28	5,926	Group stage	2nd round
2022	J2	2	22	7th	42	18	9	15	67	59	8	63	8,991	Not eligible	3rd round
2023	J2	2	22	16th	42	12	12	18	48	61	-13	48	11,215	Not eligible	3rd round
2024	J2	2	20	6th	38	18	10	10	50	44	6	64	13,331	1st round	2nd round
2025	J2	2	20	7th	38	16	14	8	47	36	11	62	13,760	1st round	2nd round
2026	J2	2	10	1st	18	16	0	2	32	15	17	43	13,054	N/A	N/A
2026-27	J2	2	20	TBD	38									TBD	TBD

- Pos. = Position in league; P = Games played; W = Games won; D = Games drawn; L = Games lost; F = Goals scored; A = Goals conceded; GD = Goals difference; Pts = Points gained
- Attendance = Average home league attendance
- † 2020 & 2021 seasons attendances reduced by COVID-19 worldwide pandemic
- Source: J.League Data Site

== Continental record ==
AFC Champions League

Sendai also participated in the ACL for the first time in 2013.

It was a tournament with many challenges other than matches, such as long-distance travel, overcrowded schedule with the J.League and local climate, but they did not lose in the extreme cold of Nanjing and the intense heat of Thailand and the final match was a draw or better in the qualifying.

It was a good point to leave the possibility of breaking through.

Season	Competition	Round	Club	Home	Away	Aggregate
2013	AFC Champions League	Group E	(Thailand) Buriram United	1–1	1–1	4th
2013	AFC Champions League	Group E	(China) Jiangsu Sainty	1–2	0–0	4th
2013	AFC Champions League	Group E	(South Korea) FC Seoul	1–0	2–1	4th

== Asian clubs ranking ==
As of 16 May 2024.

Current Rank	Country	Team	Points
175	(Lebanon)	Nantong Zhiyun FC	1290
176	(China)	Qingdao Jonoon	1290
177	(Hong Kong)	Kitchee	1290
178	(Iran)	Pas Hamedan	1288
179	(Japan)	Vegalta Sendai	1288
180	(Japan)	V-Varen Nagasaki	1288

== Vegalta House ==
"Shichigashuku Town's Empty House Revitalization Project: Let's Build a Vegalta House" will start in July 2021 with the support of 143 crowdfunding people and a total of 78 local workers. It is involved in a social collaboration activity, in line with Goal 11 "Sustainable cities and communities" and Goal 17 "Partnership for the goals" of the SDGs basic guidelines.
