= List of J2 League transfers winter 2015–16 =

This is a list of Japanese football J2 League transfers in the winter transfer window 2015–16 by club.

== Matsumoto Yamaga ==
In: Note: Flags indicate national team as defined under FIFA eligibility rules; some limited exceptions apply. Players may hold more than one non-FIFA nationality.

No.	Pos.	Nation	Player
1	GK	JPN	Daniel Schmidt (on loan from (Japan) Vegalta Sendai)
7	MF	JPN	Takuya Takei (from (Japan) Vegalta Sendai)
15	MF	JPN	Masaki Miyasaka (from (Japan) Montedio Yamagata)
18	DF	JPN	Takefumi Toma (from (Japan) Montedio Yamagata)
19	FW	JPN	Hiroki Yamamoto (from (Japan) Vegalta Sendai)
26	FW	KOR	Han Seung-hyeong (from Korea University)
33	DF	JPN	Yu Yasukawa (from (Japan) Oita Trinita)
38	FW	JPN	Daizen Maeda (from Yamanashi Gakuin University)

Out: Note: Flags indicate national team as defined under FIFA eligibility rules; some limited exceptions apply. Players may hold more than one non-FIFA nationality.

No.	Pos.	Nation	Player
—	GK	JPN	Tomohiko Murayama (to (Japan) Shonan Bellmare)
—	DF	JPN	Yuki Okubo (to (Japan) JEF United Chiba)
—	DF	JPN	Kenshiro Tanioku (on loan to (Japan) Azul Claro Numazu)
—	DF	JPN	Shunsuke Iwanuma (to (Japan) Kyoto Sanga)
—	DF	JPN	Shusaku Tokita (released)
—	MF	JPN	Yuzo Iwakami (to (Japan) Omiya Ardija)
—	MF	JPN	Yuki Kitai (to (Japan) Kataller Toyama, previously on loan)
—	MF	JPN	Tatsuya Wada (to (Japan) Tochigi SC)
—	MF	BRA	Eric Pereira (released)
—	MF	KOR	Park Kwang-il (to (Japan) Mito Hollyhock, previously on loan)
—	MF	JPN	Ryota Iwabuchi (to (Japan) SC Sagamihara)
—	MF	JPN	Shuho Miyashita (to (Japan) Tochigi UVA)
—	MF	KOR	Kim Bo-kyung (to (South Korea) Jeonbuk Hyundai Motors FC)
—	FW	JPN	Yuki Natsume (released)
—	FW	JPN	Ryota Nakamura (to (Japan) Azul Claro Numazu)
—	FW	JPN	Yoshiro Abe (retired)
—	FW	JPN	Tomoki Ikemoto (to (Japan) Giravanz Kitakyushu)
—	FW	JPN	Shogo Shiozawa (to (Japan) Nagano Parceiro)

== Shimizu S-Pulse ==
In: Note: Flags indicate national team as defined under FIFA eligibility rules; some limited exceptions apply. Players may hold more than one non-FIFA nationality.

No.	Pos.	Nation	Player
1	GK	JPN	Yohei Nishibe (from (Japan) Kawasaki Frontale)
15	DF	KOR	Byeon Jun-Byum (loan from (Japan) Sanfrecce Hiroshima)
24	DF	JPN	Naoki Kawaguchi (on loan from (Japan) Albirex Niigata)
32	MF	JPN	Shin Mitsuzaki (from Tokai Gakuen High School)
38	DF	JPN	Takayuki Fukumura (from (Japan) Kyoto Sanga, previously on loan)
45	DF	JPN	Makoto Kakuda (loan return from (Japan) Kawasaki Frontale)

Out: Note: Flags indicate national team as defined under FIFA eligibility rules; some limited exceptions apply. Players may hold more than one non-FIFA nationality.

No.	Pos.	Nation	Player
—	GK	JPN	Masatoshi Kushibiki (on loan to (Japan) Kashima Antlers)
—	DF	JPN	Jumpei Takaki (to (Japan) Tokyo Verdy)
—	DF	NED	Calvin Jong-a-Pin (released)
—	DF	BRA	Daniel Bueno (to (Japan) Kashima Antlers)
—	DF	JPN	Yasuhiro Hiraoka (on loan to (Japan) Vegalta Sendai)
—	DF	JPN	Taisuke Muramatsu (on loan to (Japan) Vissel Kobe)
—	MF	JPN	Kenta Uchida (to (Japan) Ehime FC, previously on loan)
—	MF	JPN	Ibuki Fujita (to (Japan) Ehime FC, previously on loan)
—	MF	JPN	Kota Miyamoto (on loan to (Japan) V-Varen Nagasaki)
—	FW	NGR	Peter Utaka (to (Japan) Sanfrecce Hiroshima)
—	FW	JPN	Hiroki Higuchi (to (Japan) Fukushima United)

== Montedio Yamagata ==
In: Note: Flags indicate national team as defined under FIFA eligibility rules; some limited exceptions apply. Players may hold more than one non-FIFA nationality.

No.	Pos.	Nation	Player
2	DF	JPN	Masakazu Tashiro (from (Japan) JEF United Chiba)
9	FW	BRA	Diego Rosa (from (Brazil) Luverdense)
15	DF	JPN	Naoki Kuriyama (from (Japan) JEF United Chiba)
16	MF	JPN	Yūhei Satō (from (Japan) Yokohama F. Marinos)
17	MF	JPN	Yuto Suzuki (from (Japan) Mito Hollyhock)
19	MF	JPN	Takahide Umebachi (on loan from (Japan) Kashima Antlers)
20	DF	KOR	Han Ho-gang (from Korea University)
22	DF	KOR	Lee Je-seung (from Dongguk University)
24	DF	JPN	Kenji Arabori (from (Japan) Tochigi SC)
31	GK	JPN	Daiki Tomii (from (Japan) Thespakusatsu Gunma)

Out: Note: Flags indicate national team as defined under FIFA eligibility rules; some limited exceptions apply. Players may hold more than one non-FIFA nationality.

No.	Pos.	Nation	Player
—	GK	JPN	Akishige Kaneda (to (Japan) Avispa Fukuoka)
—	DF	JPN	Takefumi Toma (to (Japan) Matsumoto Yamaga)
—	DF	JPN	Hideyuki Nakamura (retired)
—	DF	JPN	Tetsuya Funatsu (to (Japan) Thespakusatsu Gunma)
—	DF	JPN	Shogo Nishikawa (to (Japan) Yokohama FC)
—	MF	JPN	Masaki Miyasaka (to (Japan) Matsumoto Yamaga)
—	MF	PER	Romero Frank (to (Japan) Albirex Niigata)
—	MF	JPN	Keita Hidaka (to (Japan) Blaublitz Akita)
—	MF	JPN	Kenichi Tanimura (to (Japan) Grulla Morioka, previously on loan)
—	MF	KOR	Kim Byeom-yong (to (Japan) Sanfrecce Hiroshima)
—	MF	JPN	Shōhei Ogura (loan return to (Japan) Gamba Osaka)
—	FW	JPN	Hiroyuki Takasaki (loan return to (Japan) Kashima Antlers)
—	FW	JPN	Yuki Nakashima (to (Japan) Machida Zelvia)
—	FW	JPN	Masato Yamazaki (to (Japan) Zweigen Kanazawa)
—	FW	JPN	Hiroki Bandai (to (Japan) Mito Hollyhock)

== Cerezo Osaka ==
In: Note: Flags indicate national team as defined under FIFA eligibility rules; some limited exceptions apply. Players may hold more than one non-FIFA nationality.

No.	Pos.	Nation	Player
6	MF	BRA	Souza (from (Brazil) Cruzeiro)
8	FW	JPN	Yoichiro Kakitani (from (Switzerland) FC Basel)
9	FW	JPN	Kenyu Sugimoto (from (Japan) Kawasaki Frontale)
10	FW	BRA	Bruno Meneghel (from (China) Dalian Aerbin)
11	FW	BRA	Ricardo Santos (from (China) Beijing Renhe F.C.)
13	MF	JPN	Mitsuru Maruoka (loan return from (Germany) Borussia Dortmund)
15	DF	JPN	Riku Matsuda (from (Japan) FC Tokyo)
16	DF	JPN	Yuki Kotani (loan return from (Japan) SC Sagamihara)
18	MF	JPN	Shohei Kiyohara (from (Japan) Zweigen Kanazawa)
22	DF	JPN	Sota Nakazawa (from (Japan) Kawasaki Frontale, previously on loan)
24	DF	JPN	Kazuya Yamamura (from (Japan) Kashima Antlers)
28	DF	JPN	Hayato Nukui (loan return from (Japan) FC Suzuka Rampole)
36	FW	JPN	Rei Yonezawa (loan return from (Japan) Blaublitz Akita)
39	DF	JPN	Shoji Honoya (promoted from youth ranks)
40	FW	JPN	Takeru Kishimoto (promoted from youth ranks)

Out: Note: Flags indicate national team as defined under FIFA eligibility rules; some limited exceptions apply. Players may hold more than one non-FIFA nationality.

No.	Pos.	Nation	Player
—	DF	JPN	Yuta Someya (to (Japan) Kyoto Sanga)
—	MF	JPN	Jumpei Kusukami (to (Japan) Sagan Tosu)
—	MF	JPN	Takamitsu Yoshino (to (Japan) Ventforet Kofu)
—	MF	JPN	Taiga Maekawa (on loan to (Japan) Tokushima Vortis)
—	MF	JPN	Takeru Okada (released)
—	MF	JPN	Hotaru Yamaguchi (to (Germany) Hannover 96)
—	MF	BRA	Pablo (loan return to (Brazil) Clube Atlético Paranaense)
—	FW	BRA	Edmílson (released)
—	FW	JPN	Ryo Nagai (to (Japan) V-Varen Nagasaki)
—	FW	BRA	Magno Cruz (released)

== Ehime FC ==
In: Note: Flags indicate national team as defined under FIFA eligibility rules; some limited exceptions apply. Players may hold more than one non-FIFA nationality.

No.	Pos.	Nation	Player
3	DF	JPN	Yuki Fukaya (from (Japan) FC Gifu)
5	MF	JPN	Ibuki Fujita (from (Japan) Shimizu S-Pulse, previously on loan)
9	MF	JPN	Kodai Yasuda (from (Japan) Tokyo Verdy, previously on loan)
27	DF	JPN	Rikiya Motegi (loan from (Japan) Urawa Red Diamonds)
37	MF	JPN	Kosuke Shirai (from (Japan) Shonan Bellmare, previously on loan)
39	MF	JPN	Kenta Uchida (from (Japan) Shimizu S-Pulse, previously on loan)
40	DF	JPN	Ryuga Suzuki (from (Japan) Kashima Antlers)
—	FW	JPN	Toyofumi Sakano (loan from (Japan) Urawa Red Diamonds)

Out: Note: Flags indicate national team as defined under FIFA eligibility rules; some limited exceptions apply. Players may hold more than one non-FIFA nationality.

No.	Pos.	Nation	Player
—	DF	JPN	Kenji Dai (loan return from (Japan) Renofa Yamaguchi, then sold to (Japan) Kataller Toyama)
—	DF	JPN	Yusuke Murakami (to (Japan) V-Varen Nagasaki)
—	MF	JPN	Kenya Okazaki (loan return to (Japan) Gamba Osaka)
—	MF	JPN	Keiji Nishimura (retired)
—	MF	JPN	Takumi Murakami (to (Japan) Roasso Kumamoto)
—	MF	JPN	Kanta Kondo (released)
—	FW	JPN	Ryota Watanabe (on loan to (Japan) Nagano Parceiro)

== V-Varen Nagasaki ==
In: Note: Flags indicate national team as defined under FIFA eligibility rules; some limited exceptions apply. Players may hold more than one non-FIFA nationality.

No.	Pos.	Nation	Player
3	DF	KOR	Cho Min-woo (from (South Korea) FC Seoul, previously on loan)
5	DF	JPN	Daichi Tagami (from Ryutsu Keizai University)
9	FW	JPN	Ryo Nagai (from (Japan) Cerezo Osaka)
10	MF	JPN	Yuji Yabu (from (Japan) Roasso Kumamoto)
13	MF	KOR	Park Hyung-jin (from (Japan) Sanfrecce Hiroshima)
14	MF	JPN	Teruki Tanaka (from (Japan) Nagoya Grampus)
16	MF	JPN	Hiroto Tanaka (on loan from (Japan) Jubilo Iwata)
17	FW	BRA	Rodrigo Paraná (from (South Korea) Bucheon FC 1995)
21	GK	JPN	Masaya Tomizawa (from Hosei University)
22	MF	JPN	Kota Miyamoto (on loan from (Japan) Shimizu S-Pulse)
23	MF	JPN	Ryota Kajikawa (from (Japan) Shonan Bellmare, previously on loan)
24	MF	JPN	Tatsuya Onodera (from (Japan) Tochigi SC)
27	DF	JPN	Yusuke Murakami (from (Japan) Ehime FC)
29	DF	JPN	Taikai Uemoto (from (Japan) Vegalta Sendai)
30	FW	JPN	Daiki Matsumoto (on loan from (Japan) Ventforet Kofu)

Out: Note: Flags indicate national team as defined under FIFA eligibility rules; some limited exceptions apply. Players may hold more than one non-FIFA nationality.

No.	Pos.	Nation	Player
—	DF	JPN	Kai Miki (loan return to (Japan) Machida Zelvia)
—	DF	JPN	Ryosuke Tone (to (Japan) Giravanz Kitakyushu)
—	DF	JPN	Atsushi Shirota (released)
—	MF	JPN	Kenta Furube (to (Japan) Avispa Fukuoka)
—	MF	JPN	Naoki Maeda (loan return to (Japan) Yokohama F. Marinos)
—	MF	JPN	Masato Kurogi (to (Japan) Ventforet Kofu)
—	MF	JPN	Naoya Ishigami (to (Japan) Giravanz Kitakyushu)
—	MF	JPN	Yudai Inoue (to (Japan) Machida Zelvia)
—	MF	JPN	Sho Hanai (to (Japan) Giravanz Kitakyushu)
—	MF	JPN	Teppei Usui (to (Japan) Nagano Parceiro)
—	MF	JPN	Hiroshi Azuma (to (Japan) Nagano Parceiro)
—	FW	JPN	Masaki Fukai (to (Japan) SC Sagamihara)
—	FW	JPN	Yutaro Takahashi (retired)
—	FW	JPN	Yosuke Kamigata (on loan to (Japan) Tochigi SC)
—	FW	JPN	Atsushi Matsuo (released)
—	FW	KOR	Lee Yong-jae (to (Japan) Kyoto Sanga)

== Giravanz Kitakyushu ==
In: Note: Flags indicate national team as defined under FIFA eligibility rules; some limited exceptions apply. Players may hold more than one non-FIFA nationality.

No.	Pos.	Nation	Player
2	MF	JPN	Naoya Ishigami (from (Japan) V-Varen Nagasaki)
14	FW	JPN	Tomoki Ikemoto (from (Japan) Matsumoto Yamaga)
20	MF	JPN	Sho Hanai (from (Japan) V-Varen Nagasaki)
41	DF	JPN	Ryosuke Tone (from (Japan) V-Varen Nagasaki)
43	MF	JPN	Masashi Motoyama (from (Japan) Kashima Antlers)

Out: Note: Flags indicate national team as defined under FIFA eligibility rules; some limited exceptions apply. Players may hold more than one non-FIFA nationality.

No.	Pos.	Nation	Player
—	DF	JPN	Toru Miyamoto (retired)
—	MF	JPN	Yuki Yamanouchi (to (Japan) Oita Trinita)
—	FW	JPN	Daiki Watari (to (Japan) Tokushima Vortis)
—	FW	JPN	Shohei Otsuka (to (Japan) Kawasaki Frontale)

== Tokyo Verdy ==
In: Note: Flags indicate national team as defined under FIFA eligibility rules; some limited exceptions apply. Players may hold more than one non-FIFA nationality.

No.	Pos.	Nation	Player
5	DF	JPN	Tomohiro Taira (from (Japan) Machida Zelvia)
9	FW	JPN	Alan Pinheiro (from (Brazil) Vitória, previously on loan)
13	MF	JPN	Yuji Funayama (from (Thailand) Air Force Central F.C.)
17	FW	JPN	Douglas Vieira (from (Brazil) Clube Náutico)
20	MF	JPN	Sion Inoue (promoted from youth ranks)
26	GK	JPN	Gakuji Ota (from (Japan) FC Gifu)
27	FW	JPN	Hiromu Kori (promoted from youth ranks)
28	MF	JPN	Keishi Kusumi (loan return from (Japan) Verspah Oita)
29	FW	JPN	Kenzi Kitawaki (loan return from (Japan) FC Suzuka Rampole)
31	GK	JPN	Ryota Suzuki (on loan from (Japan) Yokohama F. Marinos)
40	DF	JPN	Jumpei Takaki (from (Japan) Shimizu S-Pulse)
—	MF	JPN	Shogo Hayashi (promoted from youth ranks)

Out: Note: Flags indicate national team as defined under FIFA eligibility rules; some limited exceptions apply. Players may hold more than one non-FIFA nationality.

No.	Pos.	Nation	Player
—	GK	JPN	Yuya Sato (to (Japan) JEF United Chiba)
—	GK	JPN	William Popp (on loan to (Japan) FC Gifu)
—	DF	JPN	Sinnosuke Hatanaka (on loan to (Japan) Machida Zelvia)
—	DF	KOR	Ko Kyung-joon (released)
—	DF	JPN	Ryoji Fukui (to (Japan) Renofa Yamaguchi)
—	DF	JPN	Colin Killoran (released)
—	MF	JPN	Kodai Yasuda (to (Japan) Ehime FC, previously on loan)
—	MF	JPN	Kento Misao (to (Japan) Kashima Antlers)
—	MF	JPN	Ryo Shibuya (to (Japan) FC Suzuka Rampole)
—	MF	BRA	Bruno Coutinho (released)
—	FW	JPN	Hiroki Sugazima (on loan to (Japan) JEF United Chiba)

== JEF United Chiba ==
In: Note: Flags indicate national team as defined under FIFA eligibility rules; some limited exceptions apply. Players may hold more than one non-FIFA nationality.

No.	Pos.	Nation	Player
3	DF	JPN	Naoya Kondo (from (Japan) Kashiwa Reysol)
5	DF	JPN	Atsuro Tatara (from (Japan) Vegalta Sendai)
6	MF	JPN	Masaki Yamamoto (from (Japan) Kawasaki Frontale)
9	FW	BRA	Élton (on loan from (Brazil) Vitória)
10	MF	JPN	Kazuki Nagasawa (loan from (Japan) Urawa Red Diamonds)
11	FW	JPN	Takayuki Funayama (from (Japan) Kawasaki Frontale)
13	DF	JPN	Yusuke Higa (from (Japan) Yokohama F. Marinos)
16	MF	JPN	Junki Koike (from (Japan) Yokohama FC)
17	DF	JPN	Yuki Okubo (from (Japan) Matsumoto Yamaga)
18	FW	JPN	Makito Yoshida (from (Japan) Mito Hollyhock)
20	DF	JPN	Masashi Wakasa (from (Japan) Oita Trinita)
21	GK	JPN	Eisuke Fujishima (on loan from (Japan) Sagan Tosu)
22	MF	PAR	Eduardo Aranda (from (Paraguay) Club Olimpia)
23	GK	JPN	Yuya Sato (from (Japan) Tokyo Verdy)
24	DF	KOR	Lee Joo-young (from (Japan) Tochigi SC)
27	DF	JPN	Shohei Abe (from (Japan) Ventforet Kofu)
30	DF	JPN	Kyoga Nakamura (loan return from (Japan) YSCC)
32	FW	JPN	Hiroki Sugazima (on loan from (Japan) Tokyo Verdy)

Out: Note: Flags indicate national team as defined under FIFA eligibility rules; some limited exceptions apply. Players may hold more than one non-FIFA nationality.

No.	Pos.	Nation	Player
—	GK	JPN	Hiroki Oka (loan return to (Japan) Ventforet Kofu)
—	GK	JPN	Syugo Tsuji (to (Japan) Sagan Tosu)
—	GK	JPN	Shun Takagi (to (Japan) Kawasaki Frontale)
—	DF	JPN	Masakazu Tashiro (to (Japan) Montedio Yamagata)
—	DF	JPN	Naoki Kuriyama (to (Japan) Montedio Yamagata)
—	DF	JPN	Ryoichi Kawazu (to (Japan) Azul Claro Numazu)
—	DF	JPN	Takashi Kanai (to (Japan) Yokohama F. Marinos)
—	DF	JPN	Taisuke Nakamura (to (Japan) Jubilo Iwata)
—	DF	JPN	Makito Ito (to (Japan) Mito Hollyhock)
—	DF	JPN	Kazuki Oiwa (to (Japan) Vegalta Sendai)
—	DF	JPN	Itsuki Urata (to (Brazil) PSTC)
—	DF	KOR	Kim Hyun-hun (to (Japan) Avispa Fukuoka)
—	MF	BRA	Paulinho (to (Japan) Shonan Bellmare)
—	MF	JPN	Koki Mizuno (to (Japan) Vegalta Sendai)
—	MF	JPN	Kentaro Sato (to (Japan) Kyoto Sanga)
—	MF	JPN	Tatsuya Yazawa (on loan to (Japan) Machida Zelvia)
—	MF	JPN	Sho Sato (to (Japan) Mito Hollyhock)
—	MF	JPN	Yusuke Tanaka (to (Japan) Ventforet Kofu)
—	FW	JPN	Masahiro Noto (released)
—	FW	JPN	Akira Toshima (to (Japan) Machida Zelvia, previously on loan)
—	FW	JPN	Riki Matsuda (loan return to (Japan) Nagoya Grampus)
—	FW	SLO	Nejc Pečnik (to (Japan) Omiya Ardija)
—	FW	JPN	Takayuki Suzuki (retired)
—	FW	JPN	Takayuki Morimoto (to (Japan) Kawasaki Frontale)

== Consadole Sapporo ==
In: Note: Flags indicate national team as defined under FIFA eligibility rules; some limited exceptions apply. Players may hold more than one non-FIFA nationality.

No.	Pos.	Nation	Player
7	MF	BRA	Julinho (from (Brazil) Operário)
11	FW	BRA	Jonathan Reis (free agent)
23	DF	BRA	Diego Macedo (from (Brazil) Bahia)
36	DF	JPN	Takahiro Masukawa (from (Japan) Vissel Kobe)
—	DF	JPN	Tatsuki Nara (loan return from (Japan) FC Tokyo)

Out: Note: Flags indicate national team as defined under FIFA eligibility rules; some limited exceptions apply. Players may hold more than one non-FIFA nationality.

No.	Pos.	Nation	Player
—	DF	BRA	Paulão (loan return to (Brazil) Roma Esporte Apucarana)
—	DF	JPN	Tatsuki Nara (to (Japan) Kawasaki Frontale)
—	DF	JPN	Jun Sonoda (to (Japan) Roasso Kumamoto)
—	DF	JPN	Takaya Osanai (on loan to (Japan) Fukushima United)
—	MF	JPN	Takuro Kikuoka (to (Japan) SC Sagamihara)
—	MF	BRA	Nildo (released)
—	MF	JPN	Makoto Sunakawa (loan return from (Japan) FC Gifu, retired)
—	MF	JPN	Hiroyuki Furuta (to (Japan) Zweigen Kanazawa)
—	FW	COL	Cristian Nazarit (released)
—	FW	JPN	Shunsuke Maeda (to (Japan) Gainare Tottori)

== Fagiano Okayama ==
In: Note: Flags indicate national team as defined under FIFA eligibility rules; some limited exceptions apply. Players may hold more than one non-FIFA nationality.

No.	Pos.	Nation	Player
9	FW	JPN	Hideya Okamoto (from (Japan) Oita Trinita, previously on loan)
18	MF	JPN	Taisuke Akiyoshi (on loan from (Japan) Ventforet Kofu)
20	FW	JPN	Yoshiki Fujimoto (from Meiji University)
24	FW	JPN	Shingo Akamine (on loan from (Japan) Gamba Osaka)
30	FW	JPN	Yuta Toyokawa (on loan from (Japan) Kashima Antlers)

Out: Note: Flags indicate national team as defined under FIFA eligibility rules; some limited exceptions apply. Players may hold more than one non-FIFA nationality.

No.	Pos.	Nation	Player
—	DF	JPN	Ryujiro Ueda (to (Japan) Roasso Kumamoto)
—	DF	JPN	Kazuya Okazaki (to Soccer Representative Club)
—	DF	JPN	Ryo Tadokoro (to (Japan) Yokohama FC)
—	MF	JPN	Ryo Iida (to (Japan) SC Sagamihara, previously on loan)
—	MF	JPN	Kazuki Someya (to (Japan) Oita Trinita)
—	MF	JPN	Ryusuke Senoo (retired)
—	MF	JPN	Ren Sengoku (to (Japan) Nagano Parceiro, previously on loan)
—	MF	JPN	Takanori Chiaki (to (Japan) Oita Trinita)
—	MF	KOR	Hwang Jin-sung (to (South Korea) Seongnam FC)

== Zweigen Kanazawa ==
In: Note: Flags indicate national team as defined under FIFA eligibility rules; some limited exceptions apply. Players may hold more than one non-FIFA nationality.

No.	Pos.	Nation	Player
4	DF	JPN	Tatsushi Koyanagi (from (Japan) Thespakusatsu Gunma)
6	MF	JPN	Akira Ando (on loan from (Japan) Shonan Bellmare)
7	MF	JPN	Masataka Kani (on loan from (Japan) Kawasaki Frontale)
9	FW	PRK	An Byong-jun (on loan from (Japan) Kawasaki Frontale)
10	MF	JPN	Andrew Kumagai (on loan from (Japan) Yokohama F. Marinos)
11	MF	JPN	Hiroyuki Furuta (from (Japan) Consadole Sapporo)
17	FW	BRA	Romarinho (from (Brazil) Vasco da Gama)
23	DF	JPN	Kazuaki Mawatari (from (Japan) Gainare Tottori)
28	DF	KOR	Kim Young-heon (from (South Korea) Byeollae United)
29	MF	KOR	Kim Tae-sung (from (South Korea) Sangju Sangmu FC U-18)
30	FW	JPN	Masato Yamazaki (from (Japan) Montedio Yamagata)

Out: Note: Flags indicate national team as defined under FIFA eligibility rules; some limited exceptions apply. Players may hold more than one non-FIFA nationality.

No.	Pos.	Nation	Player
—	DF	JPN	Haruki Yamauchi (to Japan Soccer College)
—	DF	JPN	Masayuki Tokutake (to (Japan) Azul Claro Numazu)
—	MF	JPN	Shunsuke Motegi (to (Japan) Vegalta Sendai, previously on loan)
—	MF	JPN	Shohei Kiyohara (to (Japan) Cerezo Osaka)
—	MF	JPN	Kazuhiro Sato (to (Japan) Mito Hollyhock)
—	MF	KOR	Cha Young-hwan (released)
—	MF	JPN	Shogo Yoshikawa (on loan to (Japan) Vanraure Hachinohe)
—	MF	JPN	Masaru Akiba (to (Japan) FC Gifu)
—	MF	JPN	Pauro Junichi Tanaka (to (Japan) FC Gifu)
—	MF	JPN	Kento Onodera (retired)
—	FW	JPN	Asuki Oishi (retired)
—	FW	JPN	Masao Tsuji (to (Japan) YSCC)
—	FW	BRA	Jean Moser (loan return to (Austria) UVB)
—	FW	JPN	Shogo Omachi (on loan to (Japan) Honda FC)

== Roasso Kumamoto ==
In: Note: Flags indicate national team as defined under FIFA eligibility rules; some limited exceptions apply. Players may hold more than one non-FIFA nationality.

No.	Pos.	Nation	Player
5	DF	JPN	Ryujiro Ueda (from (Japan) Fagiano Okayama)
6	MF	JPN	Takumi Murakami (from (Japan) Ehime FC)
19	DF	JPN	Taishin Morikawa (loan return from (Japan) Gainare Tottori)
20	MF	JPN	Hayate Hachikubo (from (Japan) Hannan University)
21	GK	JPN	Daiki Kanei (loan return from (Japan) Oita Trinita)
29	FW	JPN	Keita Saito (from (Japan) Fukushima United)
30	GK	JPN	Akihiro Sato (from (Japan) Kashima Antlers)
33	DF	JPN	Jun Sonoda (from (Japan) Consadole Sapporo)

Out: Note: Flags indicate national team as defined under FIFA eligibility rules; some limited exceptions apply. Players may hold more than one non-FIFA nationality.

No.	Pos.	Nation	Player
—	GK	JPN	Daniel Schmidt (loan return to (Japan) Vegalta Sendai)
—	DF	JPN	Naoki Otani (loan return to (Japan) Sanfrecce Hiroshima)
—	DF	JPN	Ryohei Okazaki (loan return to (Japan) Shonan Bellmare)
—	DF	JPN	Dai Fujimoto (released)
—	DF	KOR	Kweon Han-jin (to (South Korea) Jeju United)
—	MF	JPN	Yuji Yabu (to (Japan) V-Varen Nagasaki)
—	MF	KOR	Kim Byeong-yeon (released)
—	MF	JPN	Hayato Nakama (to (Japan) Kamatamare Sanuki, previously on loan)
—	FW	JPN	Satoshi Tokiwa (to (Japan) Thespakusatsu Gunma)
—	FW	BRA	Pablo (to (Japan) FC Suzuka Rampole)
—	FW	JPN	Tatsuya Tanaka (on loan to (Japan) FC Gifu)
—	FW	JPN	Kazuki Saito (to (Japan) Jubilo Iwata)

== Tokushima Vortis ==
In: Note: Flags indicate national team as defined under FIFA eligibility rules; some limited exceptions apply. Players may hold more than one non-FIFA nationality.

No.	Pos.	Nation	Player
6	MF	BRA	Carlinhos (from (Japan) Omiya Ardija)
8	MF	JPN	Ken Iwao (from (Japan) Shonan Bellmare)
15	DF	JPN	Rikuya Izutsu (from (Japan) Kwansei Gakuin University)
16	FW	JPN	Daiki Watari (from (Japan) Giravanz Kitakyushu)
17	FW	JPN	Ryogo Yamasaki (on loan from (Japan) Sagan Tosu)
19	DF	JPN	Yuto Uchida (from (Japan) Gamba Osaka)
23	MF	JPN	Taiga Maekawa (on loan from (Japan) Cerezo Osaka)
29	GK	JPN	Daichi Sugimoto (on loan from (Japan) Kyoto Sanga)

Out: Note: Flags indicate national team as defined under FIFA eligibility rules; some limited exceptions apply. Players may hold more than one non-FIFA nationality.

No.	Pos.	Nation	Player
—	DF	JPN	Yoshiaki Kinoshita (retired)
—	MF	JPN	Ryo Kubota (on loan to (Japan) Kataller Toyama)
—	MF	JPN	Yu Eto (to (Japan) Kataller Toyama)
—	MF	COL	Julián Estiven Vélez (retired)
—	MF	JPN	Daisuke Saito (to (Japan) Tochigi SC)
—	MF	JPN	Tomoyasu Hirose (retired)
—	FW	KOR	Kim Jong-min (to (South Korea) Suwon Samsung Bluewings)
—	FW	JPN	Tomohiro Tsuda (to (Japan) Yokohama FC)

== Yokohama FC ==
In: Note: Flags indicate national team as defined under FIFA eligibility rules; some limited exceptions apply. Players may hold more than one non-FIFA nationality.

No.	Pos.	Nation	Player
3	DF	JPN	Ryo Tadokoro (from (Japan) Fagiano Okayama)
4	DF	SLO	Denis Halihovic (from (Slovenia) FC Koper)
5	DF	JPN	Shogo Nishikawa (from (Japan) Montedio Yamagata)
9	FW	JPN	Tomohiro Tsuda (from (Japan) Tokushima Vortis)
13	MF	JPN	Yōsuke Nozaki (free agent, resigned)
24	MF	JPN	Leo Osaki (from (United States) Carolina RailHawks)
28	DF	JPN	Yuta Fujii (from (Japan) Omiya Ardija)
30	FW	JPN	Kosuke Saito (promoted from youth ranks)
31	MF	JPN	Yuta Maejima (promoted from youth ranks)
32	MF	VIE	Nguyễn Tuấn Anh (on loan from (Vietnam) Hoàng Anh Gia Lai F.C.)

Out: Note: Flags indicate national team as defined under FIFA eligibility rules; some limited exceptions apply. Players may hold more than one non-FIFA nationality.

No.	Pos.	Nation	Player
—	GK	JPN	Taiki Murai (retired)
—	DF	JPN	Tsukasa Morimoto (on loan to (Japan) Nara Club)
—	DF	JPN	Takanori Nakajima (to (Japan) Gainare Tottori)
—	DF	KOR	Park Tae-hong (to (South Korea) Daegu FC)
—	MF	JPN	Kazunori Iio (to (Japan) Okinawa SV)
—	MF	JPN	Takumi Watanabe (to (Japan) Fukushima United)
—	MF	KOR	Bae Hu-min (on loan to (South Korea) Gyeongju Korea Hydro & Nuclear Power FC)
—	MF	JPN	Junki Koike (to (Japan) JEF United Chiba)
—	MF	JPN	Masaaki Hideguchi (to (Vietnam) Hoàng Anh Gia Lai F.C.)
—	FW	JPN	Shota Aoki (to (Japan) Azul Claro Numazu)
—	FW	JPN	Masaru Kurotsu (to (Japan) Gainare Tottori)

== Kamatamare Sanuki ==
In: Note: Flags indicate national team as defined under FIFA eligibility rules; some limited exceptions apply. Players may hold more than one non-FIFA nationality.

No.	Pos.	Nation	Player
4	DF	JPN	Kazuyi Sunamori (from (Japan) Honda FC)
11	MF	JPN	Kenji Baba (from (Japan) Mito Hollyhock)
17	MF	JPN	Tamaki Fumiya (from (Japan) Kansai University of International Studies)
18	FW	BRA	Miguel Bianconi (on loan from (Brazil) Palmeiras B)
19	MF	JPN	Hayato Nakama (from (Japan) Roasso Kumamoto, previously on loan)
23	DF	JPN	Hironori Nishi (from (Japan) Oita Trinita)
27	GK	JPN	Daiki Shinagawa (from (South Korea) Jeonju University)

Out: Note: Flags indicate national team as defined under FIFA eligibility rules; some limited exceptions apply. Players may hold more than one non-FIFA nationality.

No.	Pos.	Nation	Player
—	DF	JPN	Keigo Numata (to (Japan) Omiya Ardija)
—	DF	JPN	Ryota Noguchi (to (Japan) FC Suzuka Rampole)
—	DF	JPN	Shohei Moriyasu (released)
—	DF	JPN	Yuji Takahashi (loan return to (Japan) Kyoto Sanga)
—	MF	JPN	Ryoga Sekihara (retired)
—	MF	FRA	Andrea Bre De (released)
—	MF	KOR	Jin-Ho Jeong (released)
—	MF	JPN	Toshihiro Horikawa (to (Japan) FC Suzuka Rampole)
—	FW	JPN	Yutaka Takahashi (retired)

== Kyoto Sanga ==
In: Note: Flags indicate national team as defined under FIFA eligibility rules; some limited exceptions apply. Players may hold more than one non-FIFA nationality.

No.	Pos.	Nation	Player
1	GK	JPN	Takanori Sugeno (from (Japan) Kashiwa Reysol)
3	DF	JPN	Yuta Someya (from (Japan) Cerezo Osaka)
4	DF	JPN	Yusuke Muta (from (Japan) Nagoya Grampus)
5	DF	JPN	Shunsuke Iwanuma (from (Japan) Matsumoto Yamaga)
6	DF	JPN	Yuki Honda (from (Japan) Nagoya Grampus)
7	FW	JPN	Ryosuke Tamura (loan return from (Japan) Sagan Tosu)
8	MF	BRA	Andrei Girotto (on loan from (Brazil) América-MG)
11	MF	JPN	Yuki Horigome (from (Japan) Ventforet Kofu)
16	FW	KOR	Lee Yong-jae (from (Japan) V-Varen Nagasaki)
19	FW	JPN	Takuro Yajima (from (Japan) Yokohama F. Marinos)
20	DF	JPN	Yuji Takahashi (loan return from (Japan) Kamatamare Sanuki)
22	MF	JPN	Kentaro Sato (from (Japan) JEF United Chiba)
25	MF	JPN	Ippei Kokuryo (loan return from (Japan) MIO Biwako Shiga)
28	DF	JPN	Ryusei Saito (loan return from (Japan) FC Osaka)
29	FW	JPN	Daiki Numa (promoted from youth ranks)
32	MF	JPN	Kota Ogino (promoted from youth ranks)

Out: Note: Flags indicate national team as defined under FIFA eligibility rules; some limited exceptions apply. Players may hold more than one non-FIFA nationality.

No.	Pos.	Nation	Player
—	GK	JPN	Daichi Sugimoto (on loan to (Japan) Tokushima Vortis)
—	GK	JPN	Kohei Doi (loan return to (Japan) Grulla Morioka)
—	DF	JPN	Takayuki Fukumura (to (Japan) Shimizu S-Pulse, previously on loan)
—	DF	JPN	Satoshi Yamaguchi (retired)
—	DF	CRO	Miloš Bajalica (released)
—	DF	JPN	Yuki Onishi (on loan to (Japan) Nara Club)
—	DF	JPN	Go Iwase (on loan to (Japan) FC Gifu)
—	DF	JPN	Takayuki Fukumura (to (Japan) Shimizu S-Pulse, previously on loan)
—	MF	KOR	Hwang Te-song (retired)
—	MF	JPN	Hiroki Nakayama (retired)
—	MF	JPN	Yoshiaki Komai (to (Japan) Urawa Red Diamonds)
—	MF	KOR	Kim Nam-il (released)
—	MF	JPN	Hayato Sasaki (to (Japan) Tochigi SC)
—	MF	JPN	Daiki Tamori (to (Japan) FC Gifu)
—	MF	JPN	Yuta Ito (from (Japan) Albirex Niigata)
—	MF	JPN	Riki Harakawa (to (Japan) Kawasaki Frontale)
—	FW	JPN	Takumi Miyayoshi (to (Japan) Sanfrecce Hiroshima)
—	FW	BRA	Felipe Félix (released)
—	FW	JPN	Kazuki Mine (to Albirex Niigata Singapore FC)

== Thespakusatsu Gunma ==
In: Note: Flags indicate national team as defined under FIFA eligibility rules; some limited exceptions apply. Players may hold more than one non-FIFA nationality.

No.	Pos.	Nation	Player
1	GK	JPN	Keiki Shimizu (on loan from (Japan) Omiya Ardija)
2	DF	JPN	Tetsuya Funatsu (from (Japan) Montedio Yamagata)
4	DF	JPN	Shusuke Tsubouchi (from (Japan) Jubilo Iwata)
8	MF	BRA	Thiago (from (Brazil) FC Primavera)
9	FW	BRA	Boka (from (Brazil) Castanhal)
10	MF	BRA	Matheus (from (Brazil) XV de Novembro)
13	FW	JPN	Shunta Takahashi (from (Japan) Nagano Parceiro)
14	MF	KOR	Lim Jung-bin (from (South Korea) Incheon National University)
17	FW	JPN	Satoshi Tokiwa (from (Japan) Roasso Kumamoto)
19	DF	JPN	Yugo Ichiyanagi (from (Thailand) Phichit F.C.)
20	MF	JPN	Hironori Ishikawa (from (Japan) Sanfrecce Hiroshima)
23	GK	KOR	Park Seung-ri (from (Japan) FC Osaka)
24	DF	JPN	Yuko Takase (on loan from (Japan) Omiya Ardija)
25	MF	JPN	Yuya Yamagishi (from (Japan) Ryutsu Keizai University)
26	MF	JPN	Yusuke Segawa (from (Japan) Meiji University)
28	MF	JPN	Shunta Simura (promoted from youth ranks)
32	MF	JPN	Shun Nakamura (from (Japan) Komazawa University)
33	DF	JPN	Daichi Hakkaku (from (Japan) Waseda University)
34	DF	JPN	Toshiki Nakamura (from (Japan) Kokushikan University)
38	FW	KOR	Oh Han-bin (from (South Korea) Daejeon Kang Jung-hung FC U-18)

Out: Note: Flags indicate national team as defined under FIFA eligibility rules; some limited exceptions apply. Players may hold more than one non-FIFA nationality.

No.	Pos.	Nation	Player
—	GK	JPN	Kazuma Kita (released)
—	GK	JPN	Daiki Tomii (to (Japan) Montedio Yamagata)
—	DF	JPN	Tatsuhi Koyanagi (to (Japan) Zweigen Kanazawa)
—	DF	JPN	Ryo Kobayashi (retired)
—	DF	JPN	Shingo Arizono (to (Japan) Machida Zelvia)
—	DF	JPN	Ryosuke Tada (to (Japan) Nagano Parceiro)
—	DF	JPN	Makoto Kobayashi (to (Japan) Saurcos Fukui)
—	DF	JPN	Ryosuke Hisadomi (to (Japan) Fujieda MYFC)
—	MF	KOR	Yoon Young-seung (released)
—	MF	JPN	Ryota Aoki (to (Japan) Nagoya Grampus)
—	MF	BRA	Hugo (released)
—	MF	PRK	Hwang Song-su (to (Japan) Oita Trinita)
—	MF	BRA	Acleisson (released)
—	MF	JPN	Ataru Esaka (to (Japan) Omiya Ardija)
—	MF	BRA	Oliveira (released)
—	MF	JPN	Shohei Yokoyama (on loan to (Japan) Machida Zelvia)
—	FW	JPN	Keita Nozaki (retired)
—	FW	BRA	Tanque (released)
—	FW	JPN	Yohei Sakai (released)
—	FW	BRA	Kaique (loan return to (Brazil) Corinthians)
—	FW	JPN	Yosei Otsu (on loan to (Japan) Oita Trinita)

== Mito Hollyhock ==
In: Note: Flags indicate national team as defined under FIFA eligibility rules; some limited exceptions apply. Players may hold more than one non-FIFA nationality.

No.	Pos.	Nation	Player
3	DF	JPN	Kazuki Sato (from (Japan) Nagoya Grampus)
4	DF	JPN	Takaaki Kinoshita (from (Japan) Jubilo Iwata)
7	MF	JPN	Akihiro Hyodo (from (Japan) Oita Trinita)
8	MF	PER	Romero Frank (on loan from (Japan) Albirex Niigata)
9	FW	JPN	Hiroki Bandai (from (Japan) Montedio Yamagata)
14	MF	JPN	Sho Sato (from (Japan) JEF United Chiba)
16	MF	VIE	Nguyễn Tuấn Anh (on loan from (Vietnam) Hoàng Anh Gia Lai F.C.)
17	MF	JPN	Yosuke Yuzawa (from (Japan) Tochigi SC)
26	MF	JPN	Kazuhiro Sato (from (Japan) Zweigen Kanazawa)
27	MF	JPN	Shota Saito (loan from (Japan) Urawa Red Diamonds)
28	GK	JPN	Ryo Ishii (from (Japan) Chukyo University)
—	DF	JPN	Makito Ito (from (Japan) JEF United Chiba)
—	MF	KOR	Park Kwang-il (from (Japan) Matsumoto Yamaga, previously on loan)

Out: Note: Flags indicate national team as defined under FIFA eligibility rules; some limited exceptions apply. Players may hold more than one non-FIFA nationality.

No.	Pos.	Nation	Player
—	GK	JPN	Nao Iwadate (to (Japan) Urawa Red Diamonds)
—	GK	JPN	Kengo Fukudome (released)
—	GK	JPN	Akihisa Okada (on loan to (Japan) FC Suzuka Rampole)
—	DF	JPN	Yudai Tanaka (to (Japan) Vissel Kobe)
—	DF	JPN	Takamasa Yamazaki (to (Japan) Vanraure Hachinohe)
—	DF	PRK	Kim Song-gi (to (Japan) Machida Zelvia)
—	DF	JPN	Ryo Shinzato (to (Japan) Ventforet Kofu)
—	MF	JPN	Kenji Baba (to (Japan) Kamatamare Sanuki)
—	MF	JPN	Hayato Ikegaya (to (Japan) Gainare Tottori)
—	MF	JPN	Kenji Koyano (to (Japan) Gainare Tottori)
—	FW	JPN	Makito Yoshida (to (Japan) JEF United Chiba)
—	MF	JPN	Yuto Suzuki (to (Japan) Montedio Yamagata)
—	FW	JPN	Musashi Suzuki (loan return to (Japan) Albirex Niigata)

== FC Gifu ==
In: Note: Flags indicate national team as defined under FIFA eligibility rules; some limited exceptions apply. Players may hold more than one non-FIFA nationality.

No.	Pos.	Nation	Player
3	DF	TLS	Wellington Rocha (from (Indonesia) PSIR Rembang)
5	MF	JPN	Tsubasa Aoki (from (Japan) Juntendo University)
7	MF	JPN	Pauro Junichi Tanaka (from (Japan) Zweigen Kanazawa)
8	MF	JPN	Masaru Akiba (from (Japan) Zweigen Kanazawa)
9	FW	BRA	Evandro (from (Japan) Oita Trinita)
10	MF	BRA	Leonardo (from (Brazil) América-MG)
19	MF	JPN	Daiki Tamori (from (Japan) Kyoto Sanga)
21	GK	JPN	Yoshinari Takagi (from (Japan) Nagoya Grampus)
22	GK	JPN	William Popp (on loan from (Japan) Tokyo Verdy)
29	FW	JPN	Bruno Castanheira (from (Singapore) Geylang International FC)
30	DF	JPN	Masaya Tashiro (from (Japan) Hosei University)
34	FW	JPN	Tatsuya Tanaka (on loan from (Japan) Roasso Kumamoto)
35	DF	JPN	Go Iwase (on loan from (Japan) Kyoto Sanga)
39	MF	JPN	Koya Kazama (from (Japan) Oita Trinita, previously on loan)
40	DF	JPN	Jun Suzuki (from (Japan) Chukyo University)

Out: Note: Flags indicate national team as defined under FIFA eligibility rules; some limited exceptions apply. Players may hold more than one non-FIFA nationality.

No.	Pos.	Nation	Player
—	GK	JPN	Gakuji Ota (to (Japan) Tokyo Verdy)
—	GK	JPN	Yoshikatsu Kawaguchi (to (Japan) SC Sagamihara)
—	DF	JPN	Yuki Fukaya (to (Japan) Ehime FC)
—	DF	JPN	Keigo Omi (to (Japan) Kataller Toyama)
—	DF	JPN	Hiroshi Sekita (to (Japan) Nagano Parceiro)
—	DF	JPN	Kazumichi Takagi (to (Japan) Jubilo Iwata)
—	DF	JPN	Masaki Watanabe (loan return to (Japan) Ventforet Kofu)
—	MF	KOR	Yun Chang-su (released)
—	MF	JPN	Masashi Miyazawa (retired)
—	MF	BRA	Henik (released)
—	MF	JPN	Takumi Kiyomoto (on loan to (Japan) Oita Trinita)
—	MF	JPN	Keisuke Ota (released)
—	MF	JPN	Ryoto Higa (on loan to (Japan) Blaublitz Akita)
—	FW	BRA	Gilsinho (released)
—	FW	JPN	Tomohiro Takana (to (Japan) Blaublitz Akita)

== Renofa Yamaguchi ==
In: Note: Flags indicate national team as defined under FIFA eligibility rules; some limited exceptions apply. Players may hold more than one non-FIFA nationality.

No.	Pos.	Nation	Player
13	MF	JPN	Naoto Ando (from (Japan) Gainare Tottori)
14	DF	JPN	Ryoji Fukui (from (Japan) Tokyo Verdy)
16	GK	JPN	Nobushige Tabata (from (Japan) Grulla Morioka)
17	MF	JPN	Taiki Kato (from (Japan) SP Kyoto FC)
19	DF	JPN	Yuji Hoshi (from (Japan) Fukushima United)
20	DF	JPN	Toshio Shimakawa (from (Japan) Blaublitz Akita)
22	DF	KOR	Yoon Sin-young (from (Japan) Daejeon Citizen FC)
25	MF	JPN	Reo Mochizuki (on loan from (Japan) Nagoya Grampus)
32	FW	JPN	Masato Nakayama (from (Japan) Gainare Tottori)
33	DF	JPN	Fumitaka Kitatani (on loan from (Japan) Yokohama F. Marinos)
34	DF	JPN	Masayuki Okuyama (from (Japan) Waseda University)

Out: Note: Flags indicate national team as defined under FIFA eligibility rules; some limited exceptions apply. Players may hold more than one non-FIFA nationality.

No.	Pos.	Nation	Player
—	GK	JPN	Koichiro Morita (released)
—	DF	JPN	Yuki Kukimoto (released)
—	DF	JPN	Kenji Dai (loan return to (Japan) Ehime FC)
—	DF	JPN	Wataru Iknaga (to (Japan) MIO Biwako Shiga)
—	DF	JPN	Hiroya Izumi (to (Japan) MIO Biwako Shiga)
—	DF	JPN	Kazuma Ikarino (retired)
—	DF	JPN	Keita Furusawa (on loan to (Japan) Tokyo Musashino City FC)
—	DF	JPN	Koichi Maeda (to (Japan) Fujieda MYFC)
—	DF	JPN	Takuma Kuroda (to (Japan) FC Kariya)
—	DF	JPN	Hiroshi Ura (released)
—	MF	KOR	Choi Ju-yong (loan return to (South Korea) Suwon Samsung Bluewings)
—	MF	JPN	Kazuki Kozuka (loan return to (Japan) Albirex Niigata)
—	MF	JPN	Sho Matsumoto (loan return to (Japan) Yokohama F. Marinos)

== Machida Zelvia ==
In: Note: Flags indicate national team as defined under FIFA eligibility rules; some limited exceptions apply. Players may hold more than one non-FIFA nationality.

No.	Pos.	Nation	Player
3	DF	JPN	Sinnosuke Hatanaka (on loan from (Japan) Tokyo Verdy)
4	DF	JPN	Kai Miki (loan return from (Japan) V-Varen Nagasaki)
5	DF	PRK	Kim Song-gi (from (Japan) Mito Hollyhock)
8	MF	JPN	Tatsuya Yazawa (on loan from (Japan) JEF United Chiba)
14	FW	JPN	Shohei Yokoyama (on loan from (Japan) Thespakusatsu Gunma)
15	MF	JPN	Yudai Inoue (from (Japan) V-Varen Nagasaki)
16	DF	JPN	Shingo Arizono (from (Japan) Thespakusatsu Gunma)
23	FW	JPN	Akira Toshima (from (Japan) JEF United Chiba, previously on loan)
30	FW	JPN	Yuki Nakashima (from (Japan) Montedio Yamagata)
—	DF	JPN	Tomoya Fukuda (from (Japan) Kokushikan University)

Out: Note: Flags indicate national team as defined under FIFA eligibility rules; some limited exceptions apply. Players may hold more than one non-FIFA nationality.

No.	Pos.	Nation	Player
—	GK	JPN	Sota Chiba (on loan to (Japan) Saurcos Fukui)
—	DF	JPN	Tomohiro Taira (to (Japan) Tokyo Verdy)
—	DF	KOR	Bae Dae-won (released)
—	DF	JPN	Shigeto Masuda (loan return to (Japan) Albirex Niigata)
—	DF	JPN	Masato Mochizuki (released)
—	DF	JPN	Takao Ishigawa (to (Japan) Azul Claro Numazu, previously on loan)
—	DF	JPN	Naoto Hiraishi (to (Japan) Fujieda MYFC)
—	MF	JPN	Yuta Inagaki (on loan to (Japan) MIO Biwako Shiga)
—	MF	JPN	Takuya Kakine (on loan to (Japan) Grulla Morioka)
—	FW	BRA	Sabia (released)
—	FW	JPN	Kohei Nakashima (to (Japan) Verspah Oita)
—	FW	JPN	Shota Saito (on loan to (Japan) Tokyo 23 FC)
—	FW	JPN	Keisuke Endo (on loan to (Japan) Fujieda MYFC)
