= 2015 Copa do Brasil First Round =

The 2015 Copa do Brasil First Round was played from 25 February to 30 April 2015, deciding the 40 teams that advanced to the Second Round.

== First round ==
Team 1	Agg.	Team 2	1st leg	2nd leg
Palmeiras (São Paulo (state))	4–1	(Bahia) Vitória da Conquista	4–1	–
Sampaio Corrêa (Maranhão)	6–4	(Espírito Santo) Estrela do Norte	2–3	4–1
Vitória (Bahia)	3–2	(Goiás) Anapolina	2–1	1–1
ASA (Alagoas)	3–1	(Roraima) São Raimundo	3–1	–
Botafogo (Rio de Janeiro (state))	6–4	(Paraíba) Botafogo	2–2	4–2
Caxias (Rio Grande do Sul)	0–3	(São Paulo (state)) Capivariano	0–3	0–0
Figueirense (Santa Catarina (state))	4–3	(Amazonas (Brazilian state)) Princesa do Solimões	2–2	2–1
Avaí (Santa Catarina (state))	3–1	(Mato Grosso) CEOV	0–0	3–1
Santos (São Paulo (state))	2–0	(Paraná (state)) Londrina	1–0	1–0
Madureira (Rio de Janeiro (state))	3–3 (a)	(Paraná (state)) Maringá	0–2	3–1
Sport (Pernambuco)	6–2	(Mato Grosso do Sul) CENE	2–1	4–1
Chapecoense (Santa Catarina (state))	5–2	(Tocantins) Interporto	5–2	−
Flamengo (Rio de Janeiro (state))	4–1	(Rio Grande do Sul) Brasil de Pelotas	2–1	2–0
Salgueiro (Pernambuco)	5–1	Piauí	5–1	−
Náutico (Pernambuco)	3–0	(Federal District (Brazil)) Brasília	1–0	2–0
Paraná (Paraná (state))	1–1 (4–5 p)	(Bahia) Jacuipense	1–0	0–1
Goiás	2–0	(São Paulo (state)) Santo André	1–0	1–0
Icasa (Ceará)	2–5	(Pará) Independente	0–5	2–0
Portuguesa (São Paulo (state))	3–1	(Amapá) Santos	3–1	−
Joinville (Santa Catarina (state))	1–3	(São Paulo (state)) Ituano	0–3	1–0
Coritiba (Paraná (state))	3–0	(Minas Gerais) Villa Nova	3–0	−
Fortaleza (Ceará)	3–1	(Piauí) Ríver	1–0	2–1
Ponte Preta (São Paulo (state))	4–1	(Rondônia) Vilhena	1–1	3–0
Boa (Minas Gerais)	2–2 (3–4 p)	(Maranhão) Moto Club	1–1	1–1
Vasco da Gama (Rio de Janeiro (state))	5–3	(Acre (state)) Rio Branco	2–1	3–2
Cuiabá (Mato Grosso)	4–3	(Alagoas) Murici	2–3	2–0
Atlético Goianiense (Goiás)	3–1	(Alagoas) Coruripe	1–1	2–0
América de Natal (Rio Grande do Norte)	5–1	(Rio Grande do Norte) Globo	5–1	−
Atlético Paranaense (Paraná (state))	2–2 (5–4 p)	(Pará) Remo	1–1	1–1
Tupi (Minas Gerais)	2–0	(Rio Grande do Norte) Alecrim	2–0	−
Ceará	1–0	(Sergipe) Confiança	0–0	1–0
América Mineiro (Minas Gerais)	3–0	(Federal District (Brazil)) Luziânia	3–0	−
Grêmio (Rio Grande do Sul)	4–1	(Paraíba) Campinense	2–1	2–0
CRB (Alagoas)	3–1	(Sergipe) Amadense	2–1	1–0
Criciúma (Santa Catarina (state))	4–1	(Espírito Santo) Real Noroeste	4–1	−
Bragantino (São Paulo (state))	2–2 (a)	(Rio Grande do Sul) Lajeadense	1–2	1–0
Bahia	3–2	(Amazonas (Brazilian state)) Nacional	0–0	3–2
Luverdense (Mato Grosso)	2–1	(Rio de Janeiro (state)) Cabofriense	1–1	1–0
ABC (Rio Grande do Norte)	3–0	(Rio de Janeiro (state)) Boavista	1–0	2–0
Paysandu (Pará)	4–2	(Mato Grosso do Sul) Águia Negra	2–2	2–0

=== Match 1 ===
March 4, 2015
22:00 UTC−03:00

Vitória da Conquista (Bahia)	1–4	(São Paulo (state)) Palmeiras
Tatú 64'	Report	Cristaldo 14' (pen.); Allione 66'; Robinho 79'; Dudu 84'

Estádio Lomanto Júnior, Vitória da Conquista
Attendance: 8,319
Referee: Charles Hebert Cavalcante Ferreira (Alagoas)

Palmeiras advanced directly due to winning by 2 or more goals difference.

=== Match 2 ===
February 25, 2015
20:30 UTC−03:00

Estrela do Norte (Espírito Santo)	3–2	(Maranhão) Sampaio Corrêa
David 31'; Carlos Alberto 45+2' (pen.), 63' (pen.)	Report	Geraldo 71'; Robert 85'

Estádio Mário Monteiro (Sumaré), Cachoeiro de Itapemirim
Attendance: 1,652
Referee: Emerson de Almeida Ferreira (Minas Gerais)

April 1, 2015
20:30 UTC−03:00

Sampaio Corrêa (Maranhão)	4–1	(Espírito Santo) Estrela do Norte
Robert 16', 81', 90'; Diones 51'	Report	Ferrugem 77'

Castelão, São Luís
Attendance: 6,169
Referee: Antônio J. L. Trindade de Sousa (Piauí)

Sampaio Corrêa won 6–4 on aggregate.

=== Match 3 ===
April 1, 2015
19:30 UTC−03:00

Anapolina (Goiás)	1–2	(Bahia) Vitória
Pedro Oldoni 12'	Report	Rogério 70'; Luiz Gustavo 82'

Estádio Jonas Duarte, Anápolis
Attendance: 5,482
Referee: Alisson Furtado (Tocantins)

April 14, 2015
19:30 UTC−03:00

Vitória (Bahia)	1–1	(Goiás) Anapolina
Rogério 79'	Report	Pedro Oldoni 34'

Estádio Manoel Barradas, Salvador
Attendance: 2,402
Referee: Alisson Furtado (Pernambuco)

Vitória won 2–1 on aggregate.

=== Match 4 ===
February 25, 2015
21:30 UTC−03:00

São Raimundo (Roraima)	1–3	(Alagoas) ASA
Wellington Boi 9'		Valdanes 14'; Uéderson 72'; Didira 82'

Estádio Raimundo Ribeiro de Souza, Boa Vista
Attendance: 349
Referee: João Batista Cunha de Brito (Amazonas)

ASA advanced directly due to winning by 2 or more goals difference.

=== Match 5 ===
April 1, 2015
22:00 UTC−03:00

Botafogo (Paraíba)	2–2	(Rio de Janeiro (state)) Botafogo
Rafael Oliveira 12', 76'	Report	Bill 49' (pen.), 52'

Almeidão, João Pessoa
Attendance: 14,360
Referee: Pablo Ramon Gonçalves Pinheiro (Rio Grande do Norte)

April 15, 2015
19:30 UTC−03:00

Botafogo (Rio de Janeiro (state))	4–2	(Paraíba) Botafogo
Bill 16'; Tomas 34'; Willian Arão 72'; Sassá 90'	Report	Gustavo 45+3'; Airton 80'

Engenhão, Rio de Janeiro
Attendance: 4,747
Referee: Thiago Duarte Peixoto (São Paulo)

Botafogo-RJ won 6–4 on aggregate.

=== Match 6 ===
March 4, 2015
19:30 UTC−03:00

Capivariano (São Paulo (state))	3–0	(Rio Grande do Sul) Caxias
Rodolfo 4', 66'; Kleiton Domingues 82'	Report

Arena Capivari, Capivari
Attendance: 1,345
Referee: Wagner Reway (Mato-Grosso)

March 19, 2015
19:30 UTC−03:00

Caxias (Rio Grande do Sul)	0–0	(São Paulo (state)) Capivariano
	Report

Estádio Francisco Stédile (Centenário), Caxias do Sul
Referee: Bráulio da Silva Machado (Santa Catarina)

Capivariano won 3–0 on aggregate.

=== Match 7 ===
March 18, 2015
21:30 UTC−03:00

Princesa do Solimões (Amazonas (Brazilian state))	2–2	(Santa Catarina (state)) Figueirense
Léo Paraíba 52' (pen.); Gilson 76'	Report	Fabinho 35'; Marquinhos 37'

Estádio Ismael Benigno, Manaus
Referee: Avelar Rodrigo da Silva (Ceará)

April 1, 2015
19:30 UTC−03:00

Figueirense (Santa Catarina (state))	2–1	(Amazonas (Brazilian state)) Princesa do Solimões
Clayton 11'; Jean Deretti 66'	Report	Nando 49'

Estádio Orlando Scarpelli, Florianópolis
Attendance: 4,314
Referee: Diego Almeida Real (Rio Grande do Sul)

Figueirense won 4–3 on aggregate.

=== Match 8 ===
April 1, 2015
21:30 UTC−03:00

CEOV (Mato Grosso)	0–0	(Santa Catarina (state)) Avaí
	Report

Arena Pantanal, Cuiabá
Attendance: 1,186
Referee: Paulo Henrique de Melo Salmazio (Mato Grosso do Sul)

April 14, 2015
19:30 UTC−03:00

Avaí (Santa Catarina (state))	3–1	(Mato Grosso) CEOV
André Lima 10', 48'; Anderson Lopes 12'	Report	Geílson 40'

Estádio da Ressacada, Florianópolis
Attendance: 6,911
Referee: Igor Junio Benevenuto (Minas Gerais)

Avaí won 3–1 on aggregate.

=== Match 9 ===
March 17, 2015
19:30 UTC−03:00

Londrina (Paraná (state))	0–1	(São Paulo (state)) Santos
		Robinho 52' (pen.)

Estádio do Café, Londrina
Attendance: 10,917
Referee: Paulo Henrique de Melo Salmazio (Mato Grosso do Sul)

April 16, 2015
21:30 UTC−03:00

Santos (São Paulo (state))	1–0	(Paraná (state)) Londrina
Elano 49'	Report

Estádio Martins Pereira, São José dos Campos
Attendance: 11,134
Referee: Igor Junio Benevenuto (Minas Gerais)

Santos won 2–0 on aggregate.

=== Match 10 ===
March 5, 2015
21:30 UTC−03:00

Maringá (Paraná (state))	2–0	(Rio de Janeiro (state)) Madureira
Gabriel Barcos 21'; Rhuan 84'	Report

Estádio Regional Willie Davids, Maringá
Attendance: 1,805
Referee: Márcio Henrique de Gois (São Paulo)

April 15, 2015
15:00 UTC−03:00

Madureira (Rio de Janeiro (state))	3–1	(Paraná (state)) Maringá
Rodrigo Pinho 6'; João Carlos 11'; Ryan 21'	Report	Edmar 80'

Estádio Conselheiro Galvão, Rio de Janeiro
Attendance: 343
Referee: Rafael Martins Diniz (Distrito Federal)

Tied 3–3 on aggregate, Maringá won on away goals.

=== Match 11 ===
April 1, 2015
22:00 UTC−03:00

CENE (Mato Grosso do Sul)	1–2	(Pernambuco) Sport
Marcelo Tevez 55'	Report	Joelinton 25'; Régis 46'

Estádio Fredis Saldivar (Douradão), Dourados
Attendance: 514
Referee: Alinor Silva da Paixão (Mato Grosso)

April 16, 2015
21:50 UTC−03:00

Sport (Pernambuco)	4–1	(Mato Grosso do Sul) CENE
Rithely 15'; Régis 37'; Felipe Azevedo 43'; Neto 80'	Report	Fernando 55'

Estádio Ilha do Retiro, Recife
Attendance: 1,864
Referee: Bruno Arleu de Araujo (Rio de Janeiro)

Sport won 6–2 on aggregate.

=== Match 12 ===
March 18, 2015
20:30 UTC−03:00

Interporto (Tocantins)	2–5	(Santa Catarina (state)) Chapecoense
Patrick 82', 88'	Report	Hyoran 26', 38'; Bruno Rangel 30', 40', 68'

Estádio General Sampaio, Porto Nacional
Referee: Sávio Pereira Sampaio (Distrito Federal)

Chapecoense advanced directly due to winning by 2 or more goals difference.

=== Match 13 ===
February 25, 2015
22:00 UTC−03:00

Brasil de Pelotas (Rio Grande do Sul)	1–2	(Rio de Janeiro (state)) Flamengo
Nena 90+1'	Report	Alecsandro 29'; Pará 74'

Estádio Bento Freitas, Pelotas
Attendance: 9,130
Referee: Vinicius Furlan (São Paulo)

March 18, 2015
22:00 UTC−03:00

Flamengo (Rio de Janeiro (state))	2–0	(Rio Grande do Sul) Brasil de Pelotas
Paulinho 70'; Eduardo da Silva 90+2'	Report

Estádio Jornalista Mário Filho (Maracanã), Rio de Janeiro
Attendance: 10,195
Referee: Rodolpho Toski Marques (Paraná)

Flamengo won 4–1 on aggregate.

=== Match 14 ===
March 31, 2015
20:30 UTC−03:00

Piauí	1–5	(Pernambuco) Salgueiro
Niel 4'	Report	Paulinho Mossoró 26'; Kanu 38', 42', 83'; Valdeir 45+2'

Albertão, Teresina
Attendance: 163
Referee: Paulo Sergio Santos Moreira (Maranhão)

Salgueiro advanced directly due to winning by 2 or more goals difference.

=== Match 15 ===
April 2, 2015
19:30 UTC−03:00

Brasília (Federal District (Brazil))	0–1	(Pernambuco) Náutico
	Report	Pedro Carmona 52'

Estádio Elmo Serejo Farias, Taguatinga
Attendance: 706
Referee: Eduardo Tomaz de Aquino Valadão (Goiás)

April 15, 2015
22:00 UTC−03:00

Náutico (Pernambuco)	2–0	(Federal District (Brazil)) Brasília
André Oliveira 14' (o.g.); Anderson Preto 85'	Report

Arena Pernambuco, São Lourenço da Mata
Attendance: 2,170
Referee: Renan Roberto de Souza (Paraíba)

Náutico won 3–0 on aggregate.

=== Match 16 ===
April 1, 2015
20:30 UTC−03:00

Jacuipense (Bahia)	0–1	(Paraná (state)) Paraná
	Report	Yan Philippe 80'

Estádio Eliel Martins (Valfredão), Riachão do Jacuípe
Attendance: 2,846
Referee: Rogério Lima da Rocha (Sergipe)

April 23, 2015
19:30 UTC−03:00

Paraná (Paraná (state))	0–1	(Bahia) Jacuipense
	Report	Nádson 74'
Penalties
Lúcio Flávio (penalty scored); Ricardinho (penalty scored); Paulo Henrique (penalty scored); Osmar (penalty scored); Cleiton (penalty missed)	4–5	(penalty scored) Marclei; (penalty scored) Bruno Silva; (penalty scored) Thiago Lima; (penalty scored) Edcarlos; (penalty scored) Nádson

Estádio Vila Capanema, Curitiba
Attendance: 2,797
Referee: Flávio Henrique Coutinho (Minas Gerais)

Tied 1–1 on aggregate, Jacuipense won on penalties.

=== Match 17 ===
February 25, 2015
19:30 UTC−03:00

Santo André (São Paulo (state))	0–1	Goiás
	Report	Alex Alves 29'

Estádio Primeiro de Maio, São Bernardo do Campo
Attendance: 716
Referee: Paulo Henrique de Melo Salmazio (Mato Grosso do Sul)

April 1, 2015
19:30 UTC−03:00

Goiás	1–0	(São Paulo (state)) Santo André
Erik 87'	Report

Estádio Serra Dourada, Goiânia
Attendance: 1,519
Referee: Rafael Martins Diniz (Distrito Federal)

Goiás won 2–0 on aggregate.

=== Match 18 ===
March 4, 2015
19:30 UTC−03:00

Independente Tucuruí (Pará)	5–0	(Ceará) Icasa
Wegno 45'; Joãozinho 46', 56'; Daniel Piauí 66'; Douglas Catita 87'	Report

Estádio Municipal Antônio Dias (Navegantão), Tucuruí
Attendance: 1,116
Referee: Paulo Sérgio Santos Moreira (Maranhão)

March 19, 2015
19:30 UTC−03:00

Icasa (Ceará)	2–0	(Pará) Independente Tucuruí
Diego Ceará 18'; Alan 34'	Report

Estádio Mauro Sampaio, Juazeiro do Norte
Attendance: 6,597
Referee: Caio Max Augusto Vieira (Rio Grande do Norte)

Independente won 5–2 on aggregate.

=== Match 19 ===
March 4, 2015
19:30 UTC−03:00

Santos (Amapá)	1–3	(São Paulo (state)) Portuguesa
Diney 64'	Report	Diego Gonçalves 39'; Matheus 58', 79'

Zerão, Macapá
Attendance: 433
Referee: Wasley do Couto Leão (Pará)

Portuguesa advanced directly due to winning by 2 or more goals difference.

=== Match 20 ===
April 1, 2015
19:30 UTC−03:00

Ituano (São Paulo (state))	3–0	(Santa Catarina (state)) Joinville
Clayson 38'; Jonatan Lima 55'; Ronaldo 68'	Report

Estádio Novelli Júnior, Itu
Attendance: 783
Referee: Rodolpho Toski Marques (Paraná)

April 16, 2015
19:30 UTC−03:00

Joinville (Santa Catarina (state))	1–0	(São Paulo (state)) Ituano
Tiago Luís 33'	Report

Arena Joinville, Joinville
Attendance: 10,237
Referee: Rodolpho Toski Marques (Paraná)

Ituano won 3–1 on aggregate.

=== Match 21 ===
March 4, 2015
22:00 UTC−03:00

Villa Nova (Minas Gerais)	0–3	(Paraná (state)) Coritiba
	Report	Wellington Paulista 4'; Leandro Almeida 58', 85'

Estádio Castor Cifuentes, Nova Lima
Attendance: 1,783
Referee: Devarly Lira do Rosário (Espírito Santo)

Coritiba advanced directly due to winning by 2 or more goals difference.

=== Match 22 ===
April 1, 2015
19:30 UTC−03:00

Ríver (Piauí)	0–1	(Ceará) Fortaleza
	Report	Cássio 36'

Estádio Governador Alberto Tavares Silva (Albertão), Teresina
Attendance: 1,538
Referee: Renan Roberto de Souza (Paraíba)

April 16, 2015
21:30 UTC−03:00

Fortaleza (Ceará)	2–1	(Piauí) Ríver
Tinga 72'; Lúcio Maranhão 90+1'	Report	Fabinho 86'

Castelão, Fortaleza
Attendance: 4,213
Referee: Lúcio José Silva de Araújo (Bahia)

Fortaleza won 3–1 on aggregate.

=== Match 23 ===
March 3, 2015
21:30 UTC−03:00

Vilhena (Rondônia)	1–1	(São Paulo (state)) Ponte Preta
Flávio 1'	Report	Fábio Santos 24'

Estádio Portal da Amazônia, Vilhena
Attendance: 748
Referee: Paulo Henrique de Melo Salmazio (Mato Grosso do Sul)

April 2, 2015
19:30 UTC−03:00

Ponte Preta (São Paulo (state))	3–0	(Rondônia) Vilhena
Rildo 36'; Fernando Bob 51' (pen.); Adrianinho 80' (pen.)	Report

Estádio Moisés Lucarelli, Campinas
Referee: Pathrice Wallace Correa Maia (Rio de Janeiro)

Ponte Preta won 4–1 on aggregate.

=== Match 24 ===
February 25, 2015
20:30 UTC−03:00

Moto Club (Maranhão)	1–1	(Minas Gerais) Boa
Naôh 38'	Report	Matheus Ferraz 40'

Castelão, São Luís
Attendance: 1,676
Referee: Andrey da Silva e Silva (Pará)

April 15, 2015
20:30 UTC−03:00

Boa (Minas Gerais)	1–1	(Maranhão) Moto Club
Pedro Augusto 27'	Report	Henrique 71'
Penalties
Uallison Pikachu (penalty scored); Leonardo (penalty missed); Léo Baiano (penalty missed); Natan (penalty scored); Moacir (penalty scored); Gilson (penalty missed)	3–4	(penalty missed) Naôh; (penalty scored) Luis Fernando; (penalty scored) Rayllan; (penalty missed) Kleo; (penalty scored) Wanderley; (penalty scored) Fagner

Estádio Dilzon Luiz de Melo, Varginha
Attendance: 663
Referee: Eduardo Santana Nunes (Segipe)

Tied 2–2 on aggregate, Moto Club won on penalties.

=== Match 25 ===
April 1, 2015 (Note: Due to the Rio Acre floods, Rio Branco v Vasco da Gama was postponed from March 4 to April 1.)
22:00 UTC−03:00

Rio Branco (Acre (state))	1–2	(Rio de Janeiro (state)) Vasco da Gama
Kinho 81'	Report	Thalles 2'; Douglas Silva 45'

Arena da Floresta, Rio Branco
Attendance: 3,525
Referee: Rodrigo Batista Raposo (Distrito Federal)

April 15, 2015
22:00 UTC−03:00

Vasco da Gama (Rio de Janeiro (state))	3–2	(Acre (state)) Rio Branco
Yago 47'; Thalles 62', 79'	Report	Alexandre Matão 43'; Kinho 72'

Estádio São Januário, Rio de Janeiro
Attendance: 1,315
Referee: Flavio Rodrigues de Souza (São Paulo)

Vasco da Gama won 5–3 on aggregate.

=== Match 26 ===
March 4, 2015
20:30 UTC−03:00

Murici (Alagoas)	3–2	(Mato Grosso) Cuiabá
Diogo França 49'; Odair Lucas 61'; Valdeir 69'	Report	Felipe Alves 15'; Egon 54'

Estádio José Gomes da Costa, Murici
Attendance: 431
Referee: Cláudio Francisco Lima e Silva (Sergipe)

March 18, 2015
21:30 UTC−03:00

Cuiabá (Mato Grosso)	2–0	(Alagoas) Murici
Felipe Blau 54'; Ricardo Braz 79'	Report

Arena Pantanal, Cuiabá
Attendance: 511
Referee: Breno Veira Souza (Goiás)

Cuiabá won 4–3 on aggregate.

=== Match 27 ===
April 1, 2015
20:30 UTC−03:00

Coruripe (Alagoas)	1–1	(Goiás) Atlético Goianiense
Tiago Lima 49'	Report	Pedro Bambu 56'

Estádio Municipal Gerson Amaral, Coruripe
Attendance: 580
Referee: Eduardo Santana Nunes (Segipe)

April 30, 2015
20:30 UTC−03:00

Atlético Goianiense (Goiás)	2–0	(Alagoas) Coruripe
Murilo 18'; Juninho 57'	Report

Estádio Serra Dourada, Goiânia
Attendance: 930
Referee: Paulo Henrique de Melo Salmazio (Mato Grosso do Sul)

Atlético Goianiense won 3–1 on aggregate.

=== Match 28 ===
April 1, 2015
20:30 UTC−03:00

Globo (Rio Grande do Norte)	1–5	(Rio Grande do Norte) América de Natal
Marcel Sacramento 61'	Report	Cascata 42'; Flávio Boaventura 48'; Regis 69'; Max 81'; Álvaro 86'

Estádio Manoel Dantas Barretto (Barretão), Ceará-Mirim
Attendance: 934
Referee: Caio Max Augusto Vieira (Rio Grande do Norte)

América de Natal advanced directly due to winning by 2 or more goals difference.

=== Match 29 ===
April 2, 2015
21:50 UTC−03:00

Remo (Pará)	1–1	(Paraná (state)) Atlético Paranaense
Igor João 76'	Report	Felipe 48' (pen.)

Estádio Olímpico do Pará (Mangueirão), Belém
Attendance: 8,112
Referee: Antonio Neuriclaudio Costa (Acre)

April 15, 2015
19:30 UTC−03:00

Atlético Paranaense (Paraná (state))	1–1	(Pará) Remo
Lula 20'	Report	Felipe Macena 54'
Penalties
Gustavo (penalty scored); Natanael (penalty scored); Felipe (penalty scored); Jadson (penalty missed); Gustavo Marmentini (penalty scored); Rafinha (penalty scored)	5–4	(penalty missed) Alex Ruan; (penalty scored) Ratinho; (penalty scored) Felipe Macena; (penalty scored) Rafael Paty; (penalty scored) Levy; (penalty missed) Ilailson

Arena da Baixada, Curitiba
Referee: Braulio da Silva Machado (Santa Catarina)

Tied 2–2 on aggregate, Atlético Paranaense won on penalties.

=== Match 30 ===
March 4, 2015
20:30 UTC−03:00

Alecrim (Rio Grande do Norte)	0–2	(Minas Gerais) Tupi
	Report	Daniel Morais 59'; Sílvio 78'

Estádio José Nazareno do Nascimento, Goianinha
Attendance: 123
Referee: João Bosco Sátiro da Nóbrega (Paraíba)

Tupi advanced directly due to winning by 2 or more goals difference.

=== Match 31 ===
April 1, 2015
22:00 UTC−03:00

Confiança (Sergipe)	0–0	Ceará
	Report

Estádio Lourival Baptista (Batistão), Aracaju
Attendance: 3,530
Referee: José Reinaldo Figueiredo (Alagoas)

April 15, 2015
22:00 UTC−03:00

Ceará	1–0	(Sergipe) Confiança
Marcos Aurélio 61' (pen.)	Report

Estádio Presidente Vargas, Fortaleza
Attendance: 4,685
Referee: Pablo Ramon Gonçalves Pinheiro (Rio Grande do Norte)

Ceará won 1–0 on aggregate.

=== Match 32 ===
February 25, 2015
19:30 UTC−03:00

Luziânia (Federal District (Brazil))	0–3	(Minas Gerais) América Mineiro
	Report	Felipe Amorim 30', 45+1'; Mancini 78' (pen.)

Estádio Zequinha Roriz, Luziânia
Attendance: 945
Referee: Bruno Rezende Silva (Goiás)

América Mineiro advanced directly due to winning by 2 or more goals difference.

=== Match 33 ===
April 1, 2015
22:00 UTC−03:00

Campinense (Paraíba)	1–2	(Rio Grande do Sul) Grêmio
Felipe Alves 65' (pen.)	Report	Douglas 50'; Luan 68'

Estádio Governador Ernani Sátyro (Amigão), Campina Grande
Attendance: 4,147
Referee: Avelar Rodrigo da Silva (Ceará)

April 15, 2015
22:00 UTC−03:00

Grêmio (Rio Grande do Sul)	2–0	(Paraíba) Campinense
Douglas 64'; Lincoln 90+3'	Report

Arena do Grêmio, Porto Alegre
Attendance: 10,667
Referee: Wagner Reway (Mato Grosso)

Grêmio won 4–1 on aggregate.

=== Match 34 ===
February 25, 2015
20:30 UTC−03:00

Amadense (Sergipe)	1–2	(Alagoas) CRB
Rafael Franciscatti 53' (pen.)	Report	Lima 61' (pen.); Daniel Marques 86'

Estádio Lourival Baptista, Aracaju
Attendance: 777
Referee: Emanuel Diniz de Araújo (Paraíba)

April 2, 2015
19:30 UTC−03:00

CRB (Alagoas)	1–0	(Sergipe) Amadense
Dudu 90'	Report

Estádio Rei Pelé, Maceió
Attendance: 2,638
Referee: José Washington da Silva (Pernambuco)

CRB won 3–1 on aggregate.

=== Match 35 ===
March 18, 2015
20:30 UTC−03:00

Real Noroeste (Espírito Santo)	1–4	(Santa Catarina (state)) Criciúma
Iverton 89'	Report	Joílson 17', 59'; Lucca 21', 72'

Estádio José Olímpio da Rocha, Águia Branca
Referee: Pathrice Wallace Correa Maia (Rio de Janeiro)

Criciúma advanced directly due to winning by 2 or more goals difference.

=== Match 36 ===
March 18, 2015
19:30 UTC−03:00

Lajeadense (Rio Grande do Sul)	2–1	(São Paulo (state)) Bragantino
Gilmar 53' (pen.); Mateus Santana 79'	Report	Pedro Henrique 11'

Arena Alvi-Azul, Lajeado
Attendance: 306
Referee: Emerson de Almeida Ferreira (Minas Gerais)

April 16, 2015
19:30 UTC−03:00

Bragantino (São Paulo (state))	1–0	(Rio Grande do Sul) Lajeadense
João Vitor 65'	Report

Estádio Nabi Abi Chedid, Bragança Paulista
Attendance: 405
Referee: Alisson Furtado (Tocantins)

Tied 2–2 on aggregate, Bragantino won on away goals.

=== Match 37 ===
April 2, 2015
21:50 UTC−03:00

Nacional (Amazonas (Brazilian state))	0–0	Bahia
	Report

Arena da Amazônia, Manaus
Attendance: 2,230
Referee: Andrey da Silva (Pará)

April 16, 2015
19:30 UTC−03:00

Bahia	3–2	(Amazonas (Brazilian state)) Nacional
Zé Roberto 10'; Tchô 41'; Kieza 90'	Report	Leonardo 18'; Charles 57'

Estádio Fonte Nova, Salvador
Attendance: 6,553
Referee: Felipe Duarte Varejão (Espírito Santo)

Bahia won 3–2 on aggregate.

=== Match 38 ===
March 5, 2015
21:30 UTC−03:00

Cabofriense (Rio de Janeiro (state))	1–1	(Mato Grosso) Luverdense
Arthur 17'	Report	Osman Junior 75'

Estádio Alair Corrêa (Correão), Cabo Frio
Attendance: 350
Referee: Rodolpho Toski Marques (Paraná)

March 18, 2015
21:30 UTC−03:00

Luverdense (Mato Grosso)	1–0	(Rio de Janeiro (state)) Cabofriense
Ricardo Maria 26'	Report

Estádio Passo das Emas, Lucas do Rio Verde
Referee: Rafael Martins Diniz (Distrito Federal)

Luverdense won 2–1 on aggregate.

=== Match 39 ===
March 4, 2015
16:00 UTC−03:00

Boavista (Rio de Janeiro (state))	0–1	(Rio Grande do Norte) ABC
	Report	Leandro Amaro 72'

Estádio Eucy de Resende, Saquarema
Attendance: 582
Referee: Aurélio Santana Martins (São Paulo)

March 19, 2015
19:30 UTC−03:00

ABC (Rio Grande do Norte)	2–0	(Rio de Janeiro (state)) Boavista
Leandro Amaro 47'; Nem 86'	Report

Frasqueirão, Natal
Referee: Renan Roberto de Souza (Paraíba)

ABC won 3–0 on aggregate.

=== Match 40 ===
March 18, 2015
21:30 UTC−03:00

Águia Negra (Mato Grosso do Sul)	2–2	(Pará) Paysandu
Tity 66'; Yago Pikachu 70' (o.g.)	Report	Bruno Veiga 4'; Aylon 16'

Estádio Iliê Vidal, Rio Brilhante
Referee: Leonardo Sígari Zanon (Paraná)

April 1, 2015
20:30 UTC−03:00

Paysandu (Pará)	2–0	(Mato Grosso do Sul) Águia Negra
Bruno Veiga 47'; Dão 74'	Report

Estádio Leônidas Sodré de Castro (Curuzu), Belém
Attendance: 8,979
Referee: Edmar Campos da Encarnação (Amazonas)

Paysandu won 4–2 on aggregate.
