= Bruno Silva =

Bruno Silva may refer to:

- Bruno Silva (cyclist) (born 1988), Portuguese cyclist
- Bruno Silva (fighter) (born 1989), Brazilian middleweight mixed martial artist
- Bruno Silva (football manager) (born 1987), Brazilian football coach
- Bruno Silva (footballer, born 1980), Uruguayan footballer
- Bruno Silva (footballer, born 1986), Brazilian footballer who plays for Avai
- Bruno Silva (footballer, born 1988), Brazilian footballer who plays for Guarani
- Bruno Silva (footballer, born April 1991), Brazilian footballer who plays for PSPS Riau
- Bruno Silva (footballer, born May 1991), Portuguese footballer who plays for Almancilense
- Bruno Silva (footballer, born 1992), Brazilian footballer, full name Bruno da Silva Fonseca, who plays for C.D. Mafra
- Bruno Silva (footballer, born 1994), Portuguese footballer
- Bruno Silva (footballer, born 2000), Brazilian footballer who plays for Chapecoense
- Bruno Gustavo da Silva (born 1990), Brazilian flyweight mixed martial artist
