= 1993 U.S. Cup =

Tournament details
- Host country: United States
- Dates: 6–19 June 1993
- Teams: 4 (from 3 confederations)
- Venue: 5 (in 5 host cities)

Final positions
- Champions: Germany
- Runners-up: Brazil
- Third place: United States
- Fourth place: England

Tournament statistics
- Matches played: 6
- Goals scored: 22 (3.67 per match)
- Attendance: 286,761 (47,794 per match)
- Top scorer(s): (Germany) Jurgen Klinsmann (4 goals)

The 1993 U.S. Cup was a round robin soccer tournament played in June 1993 and organized by the United States Soccer Federation. The United States hosted Brazil, England and Germany; all three of those countries were playing in their only U.S. Cup. The U.S. Cup began as a four-team invitational tournament in 1992 and would be played each year until 2000, except for the World Cup years of 1994 and 1998. The team with the best record at the end of the cup was crowned the cup champion. This year, Germany went on to win the title. England participated in the hope that they would be acclimatizing for the following year's World Cup, but in the end, they failed to qualify for that tournament.

The final game of the tournament, between Germany and England, took place in the Pontiac Silverdome, an indoor stadium in Detroit, Michigan. This was the first soccer game played indoors on grass and it served as a test for the upcoming 1994 FIFA World Cup to be held in the United States. In that World Cup, several venues, such as the Silverdome, had complete roofs and the World Cup organizers wanted to test the feasibility of using grass on an indoor field.

== Venues ==
New Haven	Foxborough	Chicago
Yale Bowl	Foxborough Stadium	Soldier Field
Capacity: 64,246	Capacity: 60,292	Capacity: 66,944
Pontiac		Washington, D.C.
Pontiac Silverdome		Robert F. Kennedy Stadium
Capacity: 80,311		Capacity: 56,500
1993 U.S. Cup is located in the United States

== Matches ==
=== United States vs Brazil ===
6 June 1993

United States	0–2	Brazil
	Report	Careca 5'; Winck 87'

Yale Bowl, New Haven, Connecticut
Attendance: 44,579
Referee: Piero Ceccarini (Italy)
Team details

United States	Brazil

GK	1	Tony Meola
RB	2	Mike Lapper
CB	15	Desmond Armstrong
CB	21	Fernando Clavijo
LB	3	John Doyle
RM	4	Bruce Murray		(substituted off) 57'
CM	12	Jeff Agoos	(c)
CM	6	John Harkes
LM	19	Chris Henderson		(substituted off) 69'
CF	17	Roy Wegerle
CF	16	Jean Harbor		(substituted off) 46'
Substitutions:
MF	5	Thomas Dooley
FW	7	Peter Woodring		(substituted on) 69'
MF	8	Dominic Kinnear
MF	9	Tab Ramos
FW	11	Eric Wynalda
MF	13	Cobi Jones		(substituted on) 57'
FW	10	Earnie Stewart		(substituted on) 46'
MF	16	Mike Sorber
GK	18	Brad Friedel
DF	20	Frank Klopas
DF	22	Alexi Lalas
DF	14	Cle Kooiman
Manager:
(Socialist Federal Republic of Yugoslavia) Velibor Milutinovic

GK	1	Cláudio Taffarel
RB	13	Winck
CB	3	Julio Cesar
CB	14	Márcio Santos
LB	6	Branco	(substituted off) 46'
RM	8	Luisinho	(substituted off) 68'
CM	5	Dunga
LM	10	Boiadeiro
RF	7	Valdeir
CF	9	Careca	(c)
LF	11	Elivelton	(substituted off) 76'
Substitutions:
DF	2	Jorginho
DF	4	Celio Silva
GK	12	Carlos
FW	15	Joao Paulo
MF	16	Almir
DF	17	Cafu		(substituted on) 76'
MF	18	Marquinhos
DF	19	Nonato		(substituted on) 46'
MF	20	Palhinha
MF	21	Raí		(substituted on) 68'
DF	22	Valber
Manager:
Carlos Alberto Parreira

=== United States vs England ===
9 June 1993

United States	2–0	England
Dooley 42'; Lalas 72'	Report

Foxboro Stadium, Foxborough (Boston)
Attendance: 37,652
Referee: Weiser (Austria)
Team details

United States	England

GK	1	Tony Meola
RB	15	Desmond Armstrong
CB	2	Mike Lapper
CB	5	Thomas Dooley	(substituted off) 69'
LB	12	Jeff Agoos
RM	6	John Harkes
CM	9	Tab Ramos (c)	(substituted off) 82'
LM	3	John Doyle
RF	21	Fernando Clavijo
CF	11	Eric Wynalda	(substituted off) 61'
LF	17	Roy Wegerle
Substitutions:
FW	4	Bruce Murray
FW	7	Peter Woodring
MF	8	Dominic Kinnear
FW	10	Jean Harbor
MF	13	Cobi Jones	(substituted on) 82'
FW	14	Earnie Stewart	(substituted on) 61'
MF	16	Mike Sorber
GK	18	Brad Friedel
MF	19	Chris Henderson
MF	20	Paul Caligiuri
DF	22	Alexi Lalas	(substituted on) 69'
Manager:
(Socialist Federal Republic of Yugoslavia) Velibor Milutinovic

GK	1	Chris Woods
RB	2	Lee Dixon
CB	6	Gary Pallister
LB	3	Tony Dorigo
RM	4	Carlton Palmer	(substituted off) 61'
CM	8	David Batty
CM	11	Paul Ince (c)
LM	16	Lee Sharpe
RF	9	Les Ferdinand	(substituted off) 35'
CF	12	Nigel Clough
LF	10	John Barnes
Substitutions:
DF	5	Des Walker	(substituted on) 61'
MF	7	David Platt
GK	13	Nigel Martyn
FW	14	Ian Wright	(substituted on) 35'
MF	15	Andy Sinton
FW	17	Paul Merson
FW	18	Teddy Sheringham
DF	19	Martin Keown
DF	20	Nigel Winterburn
DF	21	Earl Barrett
GK	22	Tim Flowers
Manager:
Graham Taylor

- .English newspaper The Sun reported this result under the headline "Yanks 2 Planks 0".

=== Brazil vs Germany ===
10 June 1993

Brazil	3–3	Germany
Helmer 13' (o.g.); Careca 32'; Luisinho 39'	Report	Klinsmann 66', 89'; Möller 80'

RFK Stadium, Washington, D.C.
Attendance: 34,737
Referee: Paul Tamberino (USA)
Team details

Brazil	Germany

GK	1	Cláudio Taffarel
RB	2	Jorginho
CB	3	Julio Cesar
CB	14	Márcio Santos
LB	6	Branco	Booked	(substituted off) 82'
RM	21	Raí	(c)
CM	5	Dunga	Booked
LM	8	Luisinho
RF	7	Valdeir		(substituted off) 64'
CF	9	Careca
LF	11	Elivelton	(substituted off) 70'
Substitutions:
GK	12	Carlos
DF	4	Celio Silva
DF	13	Winck
DF	17	Cafu		(substituted on) 70'
DF	19	Nonato		(substituted on) 82'
DF	22	Valber
MF	10	Boiadeiro
MF	18	Marquinhos
MF	20	Palhinha
FW	15	Joao Paulo
FW	16	Almir		(substituted on) 64'
Manager:
Carlos Alberto Parreira

GK	1	Andreas Köpke
SW	16	Matthias Sammer	(substituted off) 46'
CB	2	Thomas Helmer
CB	4	Jürgen Kohler
CB	3	Guido Buchwald
RM	5	Stefan Effenberg
CM	8	Michael Zorc	(substituted off) 58'
CM	6	Lothar Matthäus(c)
LM	9	Christian Ziege	(substituted off) 74'
AM	10	Andreas Möller
CF	11	Jürgen Klinsmann
Substitutions:
GK	12	Bodo Illgner
DF	14	Michael Schulz	(substituted on) 74'
MF	5	Olaf Thon
MF	13	Karl-Heinz Pflipsen
MF	15	Uwe Bein
MF	19	Thomas Strunz	(substituted on) 58'
FW	9	Karl-Heinz Riedle	(substituted on) 46'
FW	11	Bruno Labbadia
Manager:
Berti Vogts

- .Brazilian soccer player Julio Cesar said $50,000 in U.S. currency and $100,000 worth of Rolex and Cartier watches were stolen from his room at the hotel during his match against Germany. Therefore, the Central defender left the Brazilian team early not playing the next match against England.

=== England vs Brazil ===
13 June 1993

England	1–1	Brazil
Platt 47'	Report	Marcio Santos 76'

RFK Stadium, Washington, D.C.
Attendance: 54,118
Referee: Helder Dias (USA)
Team details

England	Brazil

GK	22	Tim Flowers
RB	21	Earl Barrett
CB	5	Des Walker
CB	6	Gary Pallister
LB	3	Tony Dorigo
RM	15	Andy Sinton		(substituted off) 46'
CM	8	David Batty
CM	11	Paul Ince	(c)	(substituted off) 67'
LM	16	Lee Sharpe
CF	12	Nigel Clough		(substituted off) 82'
CF	14	Ian Wright
Substitutions:
GK	1	Chris Woods
DF	2	Lee Dixon
MF	4	Carlton Palmer		(substituted on) 67'
MF	7	David Platt		(substituted on) 46'
FW	9	Les Ferdinand
FW	10	John Barnes
GK	13	Nigel Martyn
FW	17	Paul Merson		(substituted on) 82'
FW	18	Teddy Sheringham
DF	19	Martin Keown
DF	20	Nigel Winterburn
Manager:
Graham Taylor

GK	1	Cláudio Taffarel
RB	2	Jorginho
CB	14	Márcio Santos
CB	22	Valber
LB	19	Nonato	(substituted off) 5'
RM	8	Luisinho	(substituted off) 57'
CM	5	Dunga
LM	21	Raí	(c)
RF	7	Valdeir	(substituted off) 67'
CF	14	Careca
LF	11	Elivelton
Substitutions:
DF	4	Celio Silva
DF	6	Branco
MF	10	Boiadeiro
GK	12	Carlos
DF	13	Winck
FW	15	Joao Paulo
FW	16	Almir	(substituted on) 67'
DF	17	Cafu	(substituted on) 5'
MF	18	Marquinhos
MF	20	Palhinha	(substituted on) 57'
Manager:
Carlos Alberto Parreira

=== United States vs Germany ===
13 June 1993

United States	3–4	Germany
Dooley 25', 79'; Stewart 72'	Report	Klinsmann 14'; Riedle 34', 39', 59'

Soldier Field, Chicago
Attendance: 53,549
Referee: Juan Carlos Loustau (Argentina)
Team details

United States	Germany

GK	1	Tony Meola
RB	2	Mike Lapper
CB	15	Desmond Armstrong
CB	21	Fernando Clavijo
LB	3	John Doyle
RM	5	Thomas Dooley	(substituted off) 67'
CM	12	Jeff Agoos
CM	6	John Harkes
LM	9	Tab Ramos	(c)	(substituted off) 78'
CF	17	Roy Wegerle
CF	11	Eric Wynalda		(substituted off) 60'
Substitutions:
MF	4	Bruce Murray
FW	7	Peter Woodring
MF	8	Dominic Kinnear
FW	10	Jean Harbor
MF	13	Cobi Jones		(substituted on) 78'
FW	14	Earnie Stewart		(substituted on) 60'
MF	16	Mike Sorber
GK	18	Brad Friedel
MF	19	Chris Henderson
DF	20	Paul Caligiuri
MF	22	Alexi Lalas		(substituted on) 67'
Manager:
(Socialist Federal Republic of Yugoslavia) Velibor Milutinovic

GK	1	Andreas Köpke
RB	4	Jürgen Kohler	(substituted off) 74'
CB	14	Michael Schulz
LB	6	Guido Buchwald
RM	2	Stefan Effenberg	(substituted off) 60'
CM	15	Uwe Bein
CM	10	Lothar Matthäus(c)
CM	19	Thomas Strunz
LM	17	Christian Ziege
RF	9	Karl-Heinz Riedle
LF	18	Jürgen Klinsmann	(substituted off) 70'
Substitutions:
GK	12	Bodo Illgner
DF	3	Thomas Helmer	(substituted on) 74'
MF	5	Olaf Thon
MF	7	Andreas Möller	(substituted on) 60'
MF	8	Michael Zorc
FW	11	Bruno Labbadia
MF	13	Karlheinz Pflipsen	(substituted on) 70'
SW	16	Matthias Sammer
Manager:
Berti Vogts

=== Germany vs England ===
19 June 1993

Germany	2–1	England
Effenberg 26'; Klinsmann 55'	Report	Platt 31'

Silverdome, Pontiac (Detroit), Michigan
Attendance: 62,126
Referee: Ernesto Filippi (Uruguay)
Team details

Germany	England

GK	12	Bodo Illgner
RB	3	Thomas Helmer
CB	14	Michael Schulz
CB	6	Guido Buchwald
LB	17	Christian Ziege
RM	2	Stefan Effenberg	(substituted off) 76'
CM	10	Lothar Matthäus	(c)
CM	19	Thomas Strunz
LM	7	Andreas Möller	(substituted off) 63'
RF	9	Karl-Heinz Riedle
LF	18	Jürgen Klinsmann
Substitutions:
GK	1	Andreas Köpke
DF	4	Jurgen Kohler
MF	5	Olaf Thon
MF	8	Michael Zorc	(substituted on) 76'
FW	11	Bruno Labbadia
MF	13	Karl-Heinz Pflipsen
MF	15	Uwe Bein
SW	16	Matthias Sammer	(substituted on) 63'
Manager:
Berti Vogts

GK	13	Nigel Martyn
RB	21	Earl Barrett
CB	5	Des Walker
LB	6	Gary Pallister	(substituted off) 53'
RM	15	Andy Sinton
CM	7	David Platt
CM	11	Paul Ince	(c)
LM	16	Lee Sharpe	(substituted off) 46'
RF	17	Paul Merson
CF	12	Nigel Clough	(substituted off) 70'
LF	10	John Barnes
Substitutions:
GK	1	Chris Woods
DF	2	Lee Dixon
DF	3	Tony Dorigo
MF	4	Carlton Palmer
MF	8	David Batty
FW	9	Les Ferdinand
CF	14	Ian Wright	(substituted on) 70'
FW	18	Teddy Sheringham
DF	19	Martin Keown	(substituted on) 53'
DF	20	Nigel Winterburn	(substituted on) 46'
GK	22	Tim Flowers
Manager:
Graham Taylor

== Scorers ==
4 goals

- (Germany) Jürgen Klinsmann

3 goals

- (Germany) Karl-Heinz Riedle
- (United States) Thomas Dooley

2 goals

- (Brazil) Careca
- (England) David Platt

1 goal

- (Germany) Stefan Effenberg
- (Germany) Andreas Möller
- (United States) Alexi Lalas
- (United States) Earnie Stewart
- (Brazil) Luis Winck
- (Brazil) Luisinho
- (Brazil) Marcio Santos

== Final rankings ==
	Team	GP	W	D	L	GF	GA	GD	Pts
1	Germany	3	2	1	0	9	7	+2	7
2	Brazil	3	1	2	0	6	4	+2	5
3	United States	3	1	0	2	5	6	−1	3
4	England	3	0	1	2	2	5	−3	1
