= 1997 Tournoi de France squads =

Below are the rosters for the 1997 Tournoi de France tournament in France.

- Players who were called to play 1998 FIFA World Cup in bold.

== Brazil ==
Head coach: Mário Zagallo

No.	Pos.	Player	Date of birth (age)	Caps	Club
1	GK	**Cláudio Taffarel**	8 May 1966 (aged 31)		(Brazil) Atlético Mineiro
2	DF	**Cafu**	7 June 1970 (aged 26)		(Brazil) Palmeiras
3	DF	**Aldair**	30 November 1965 (aged 31)		(Italy) Roma
4	DF	Márcio Santos	15 September 1969 (aged 27)		(Brazil) Atlético Mineiro
5	MF	Mauro Silva	12 January 1968 (aged 29)		(Spain) Deportivo de La Coruña
6	DF	**Roberto Carlos**	10 April 1973 (aged 24)		(Spain) Real Madrid
7	MF	**Giovanni**	4 February 1972 (aged 25)		(Spain) Barcelona
8	MF	**Dunga**	31 October 1963 (aged 33)		(Japan) Júbilo Iwata
9	FW	**Ronaldo**	18 September 1976 (aged 20)		(Spain) Barcelona
10	MF	**Leonardo**	5 September 1969 (aged 27)		(France) Paris Saint-Germain
11	FW	Romário	29 January 1966 (aged 31)		(Brazil) Flamengo
12	GK	**Carlos Germano**	14 August 1970 (aged 26)		(Brazil) Vasco da Gama
13	MF	Djalminha	9 December 1970 (aged 26)		(Brazil) Palmeiras
14	DF	Zé Maria	25 July 1973 (aged 23)		(Italy) Parma
15	DF	Célio Silva	20 May 1968 (aged 29)		(Brazil) Corinthians
16	DF	**Gonçalves**	22 February 1966 (aged 31)		(Brazil) Botafogo
17	MF	**Zé Roberto**	6 July 1974 (aged 22)		(Spain) Real Madrid
18	MF	**César Sampaio**	31 March 1968 (aged 29)		(Japan) Yokohama Flügels
19	MF	Flávio Conceição	12 June 1974 (aged 22)		(Spain) Deportivo de La Coruña
20	MF	**Denílson**	24 August 1977 (aged 19)		(Brazil) São Paulo
21	FW	**Edmundo**	2 April 1971 (aged 26)		(Brazil) Vasco da Gama
22	FW	Paulo Nunes	30 October 1971 (aged 25)		(Brazil) Grêmio Porto Alegrense

== England ==
Le Tournoi gave England manager Glenn Hoddle a valuable opportunity to work with his chosen squad for three and a half weeks, as well as to field an experimental side in the game against Italy which "blended a caucus of Manchester United youth with some Premiership wrinklies". England's victory against France was their first since 1949, but after their exit in the last 16 of the World Cup the following year and departure of Hoddle seven months later, Le Tournoi was a "reminder of unfulfilled promise".

No.	Pos.	Player	Date of birth (age)	Caps	Club
1	GK	**David Seaman**	19 September 1963 (aged 33)		(England) Arsenal
2	DF	**Gary Neville**	18 February 1975 (aged 22)		(England) Manchester United
3	DF	Stuart Pearce	24 April 1962 (aged 35)		(England) Nottingham Forest
4	MF	**Paul Ince**	21 October 1967 (aged 29)		(Italy) Inter Milan
5	DF	**Gareth Southgate**	3 September 1970 (aged 26)		(England) Aston Villa
6	DF	**Graeme Le Saux**	17 October 1968 (aged 28)		(England) Blackburn Rovers
7	MF	**David Beckham**	2 May 1975 (aged 22)		(England) Manchester United
8	MF	Paul Gascoigne	27 May 1967 (aged 30)		(Scotland) Rangers
9	FW	**Alan Shearer**	13 August 1970 (aged 26)		(England) Newcastle United
10	FW	**Teddy Sheringham**	2 April 1966 (aged 31)		(England) Tottenham Hotspur
11	MF	**Rob Lee**	1 February 1966 (aged 31)		(England) Newcastle United
12	DF	**Sol Campbell**	18 September 1974 (aged 22)		(England) Tottenham Hotspur
13	GK	**Tim Flowers**	3 February 1967 (aged 30)		(England) Blackburn Rovers
14	DF	Phil Neville	21 January 1977 (aged 20)		(England) Manchester United
15	DF	**Martin Keown**	24 July 1966 (aged 30)		(England) Arsenal
16	DF	John Scales	4 July 1966 (aged 30)		(England) Liverpool
17	MF	**David Batty**	2 December 1968 (aged 28)		(England) Newcastle United
18	MF	Lee Clark	27 October 1972 (aged 24)		(England) Sunderland
19	MF	**Paul Scholes**	16 November 1974 (aged 22)		(England) Manchester United
20	FW	Ian Wright	3 November 1963 (aged 33)		(England) Arsenal
21	FW	Andy Cole	15 October 1971 (aged 25)		(England) Manchester United
22	GK	**Nigel Martyn**	11 August 1966 (aged 30)		(England) Leeds United

== France ==
Head coach: Aimé Jacquet

No.	Pos.	Player	Date of birth (age)	Caps	Club
1	GK	**Lionel Charbonnier**	25 October 1966 (aged 30)		(France) Auxerre
2	DF	**Vincent Candela**	24 October 1973 (aged 23)		(Italy) Roma
3	MF	Pierre Laigle	9 September 1970 (aged 26)		(Italy) Sampdoria
4	DF	**Franck Leboeuf**	22 January 1968 (aged 29)		(England) Chelsea
5	DF	**Laurent Blanc**	19 November 1965 (aged 31)		(Spain) Barcelona
6	MF	**Youri Djorkaeff**	9 March 1968 (aged 29)		(Italy) Inter Milan
7	MF	**Didier Deschamps**	15 October 1968 (aged 28)		(Italy) Juventus
8	DF	**Marcel Desailly**	7 September 1968 (aged 28)		(Italy) Milan
9	FW	**Christophe Dugarry**	24 March 1972 (aged 25)		(Italy) Milan
10	MF	**Zinedine Zidane**	23 June 1972 (aged 24)		(Italy) Juventus
11	FW	Patrice Loko	6 February 1970 (aged 27)		(France) Paris Saint-Germain
12	DF	**Bixente Lizarazu**	9 December 1969 (aged 27)		(Spain) Athletic Bilbao
13	MF	Ibrahim Ba	12 November 1973 (aged 23)		(France) Girondins de Bordeaux
14	MF	**Robert Pires**	29 October 1973 (aged 23)		(France) Metz
15	DF	**Lilian Thuram**	1 January 1972 (aged 25)		(Italy) Parma
16	GK	**Fabien Barthez**	28 June 1971 (aged 25)		(France) Monaco
17	MF	**Patrick Vieira**	23 June 1976 (aged 20)		(England) Arsenal
18	DF	Bruno Ngotty	10 June 1971 (aged 25)		(France) Paris Saint-Germain
19	MF	**Christian Karembeu**	3 December 1970 (aged 26)		(Italy) Sampdoria
20	FW	Nicolas Ouédec	28 October 1971 (aged 25)		(Spain) Espanyol
21	MF	Marc Keller	14 January 1968 (aged 29)		(Germany) Karlsruhe
22	FW	Florian Maurice	20 January 1974 (aged 23)		(France) Olympique Lyonnais

== Italy ==
Head coach: Cesare Maldini

No.	Pos.	Player	Date of birth (age)	Caps	Club
1	GK	Angelo Peruzzi	16 February 1970 (aged 27)		(Italy) Juventus
2	DF	Ciro Ferrara	11 February 1967 (aged 30)		(Italy) Juventus
3	DF	**Paolo Maldini**	26 June 1968 (aged 28)		(Italy) Milan
4	MF	**Dino Baggio**	24 July 1971 (aged 25)		(Italy) Parma
5	DF	**Fabio Cannavaro**	13 September 1973 (aged 23)		(Italy) Parma
6	DF	**Alessandro Costacurta**	24 April 1966 (aged 31)		(Italy) Milan
7	MF	**Angelo Di Livio**	26 July 1966 (aged 30)		(Italy) Juventus
8	MF	**Roberto Di Matteo**	29 March 1970 (aged 27)		(England) Chelsea
9	FW	Pierluigi Casiraghi	4 March 1969 (aged 28)		(Italy) Lazio
10	MF	**Demetrio Albertini**	23 August 1971 (aged 25)		(Italy) Milan
11	FW	Gianfranco Zola	5 July 1966 (aged 30)		(England) Chelsea
12	GK	**Gianluca Pagliuca**	18 December 1966 (aged 30)		(Italy) Inter Milan
13	DF	Christian Panucci	12 April 1973 (aged 24)		(Spain) Real Madrid
14	DF	**Alessandro Nesta**	19 March 1976 (aged 21)		(Italy) Lazio
15	DF	Antonio Benarrivo	21 August 1968 (aged 28)		(Italy) Parma
16	DF	Stefano Torrisi	7 May 1971 (aged 26)		(Italy) Bologna
17	MF	Giampiero Maini	29 September 1971 (aged 25)		(Italy) Vicenza
18	MF	Diego Fuser	11 November 1968 (aged 28)		(Italy) Lazio
19	FW	**Christian Vieri**	12 July 1973 (aged 23)		(Italy) Juventus
20	FW	**Alessandro Del Piero**	9 November 1974 (aged 22)		(Italy) Juventus
21	FW	**Filippo Inzaghi**	9 August 1973 (aged 23)		(Italy) Atalanta
22	FW	**Enrico Chiesa**	29 December 1970 (aged 26)		(Italy) Parma
23	MF	Attilio Lombardo	6 January 1966 (aged 31)		(Italy) Juventus
