= United States v England =

United States v England may refer to the following group matches in the 1950, 2010 and 2022 FIFA World Cup:

- United States v England (1950 FIFA World Cup)
- United States v England (1993 US Cup)
- England v United States (2010), group match in the 2010 FIFA World Cup
- United States v England, Group match in the 2022 FIFA World Cup
- United States v England, Super 8 match in ICC T20 world cup 2024

== See also ==
- Wars between the United Kingdom and the United States
