= Luisinho (footballer, born 1965) =

Brazilian footballer

Personal information
- Full name: Luís Carlos Quintanilha
- Date of birth: 17 March 1965 (age 61)
- Place of birth: Rio de Janeiro, Brazil
- Height: 1.68 m (5 ft 6 in)
- Position: Midfielder

Team information
- Current team: Bahia (assistant)

Senior career*
| Years | Team | Apps | (Gls) |
| 1983–1990 | Botafogo | 95 | (7) |
| 1991–2000 | Vasco da Gama | 394 | (8) |
| 1993 | → Celta Vigo (loan) | 10 | (0) |
| 1994 | → Corinthians (loan) | 16 | (0) |
| Total | | 243 | (7) |

International career
| 1992–1993 | Brazil | 8 | (1) |

Managerial career
- 2012: Rio Branco
- 2014: Santa Cruz-RJ
- 2016: São Cristóvão
- 2017–: Bahia (assistant)
- * Club domestic league appearances and goals

Luís Carlos Quintanilha (born 17 March 1965), commonly known as Luisinho, is a retired Brazilian footballer who spent most of his career with Botafogo and Vasco da Gama.

== International career ==
Luisinho represented Brazil at the 1993 Copa América, scoring in the penalty shoot-out loss to Argentina. He scored his only goal for his nation at the 1993 U.S. Cup, in a 3–3 draw with Germany.

== Career statistics ==
=== International ===
| National team | Year | Apps | Goals |
|---|---|---|---|
| Brazil | 1992 | 2 | 0 |
| Brazil | 1993 | 6 | 1 |
| Total | | 8 | 1 |

=== International goals ===
Scores and results list Brazil's goal tally first.

| No | Date | Venue | Opponent | Score | Result | Competition |
|---|---|---|---|---|---|---|
| 1. | 10 June 1993 | Robert F. Kennedy Memorial Stadium, Washington, D.C., United States | Germany | 3–0 | 3–3 | 1993 U.S. Cup |
