= Tomohiro Taira =

Japanese footballer

Tomohiro Taira 平 智広
Personal information
- Full name: Tomohiro Taira
- Date of birth: 10 May 1990 (age 36)
- Place of birth: Higashikurume, Tokyo, Japan
- Height: 1.82 m (6 ft 0 in)
- Position: Defender

Team information
- Current team: Zweigen Kanazawa
- Number: 55

Youth career
- Higashi-kurume Hibari SC
- Yokogawa Musashino FC
- Tokyo Verdy

College career
Years	Team	Apps	(Gls)
2009–2012	Hosei University		

Senior career*
Years	Team	Apps	(Gls)
2013–2015	FC Machida Zelvia	86	(1)
2016–2024	Tokyo Verdy	215	(13)
2024-	Zweigen Kanazawa	23	(2)
- * Club domestic league appearances and goals as of 1 January 2026

Tomohiro Taira (平 智広, Taira, Tomohiro; born 10 May 1990 in Higashikurume, Tokyo) is a Japanese footballer who plays for Zweigen Kanazawa.

== Youth career ==
When young, Taira played for Higashi-kurume Hibari SC, before moving up to join Yokogawa Musashino FC.

He then played for The Tokyo Verdi youth team until he started university.

== College ==
Taira played for the Hosei University team while attending that university from 2009-2012.

== Professional career ==
Taira joined FC Machida Zelvin in 2013 after graduating from Hosei University.

In 2016 he returned to Tokyo Verdi, this time as a professional player. He had hoped to moved with Tokyo Verdi as they returned to the J1 League for the 2024 season, but after playing only two games at J1 level, it was instead announced that he would transfer to the J3 League team Zweigen Kanazawa. Taira played as Verdy’s team captain during the 2021 and 2022 season, and was the oldest member of the team.

Taira started playing for Zweigen Kanazawa from July in the 2024 season.

== Club statistics ==
Updated to 19 July 2022.

Club performance			League		Cup		Other		Total	
Season	Club	League	Apps	Goals	Apps	Goals	Apps	Goals	Apps	Goals
Japan			League		Emperor's Cup		Other^{1}		Total	
2013	FC Machida Zelvia	JFL	24	1	–		–		24	1
2014	FC Machida Zelvia	J3 League	32	0	–		–		32	0
2015	FC Machida Zelvia	J3 League	30	0	4	1	2	0	36	1
2016	Tokyo Verdy	J2 League	23	3	2	2	–		25	5
2017	Tokyo Verdy	J2 League	38	2	0	0	1	0	39	2
2018	Tokyo Verdy	J2 League	26	2	2	1	0	0	28	3
2019	Tokyo Verdy	J2 League	32	1	0	0	–		32	1
2020	Tokyo Verdy	J2 League	41	2	–		–		41	2
2021	Tokyo Verdy	J2 League	8	0	0	0	–		8	0
2022	Tokyo Verdy	J2 League	5	1	2	0	–		7	1
2023	Tokyo Verdy	J2 League	31	1	–		–		31	1
2024	Tokyo Verdy	J1 League	1	0	–		1	0	2	0
2024	Zweigen Kanazawa	J3 League	10	0						
Career total			301	13	10	4	4	0	315	17

^{1}Includes J1 Playoffs and J2/J3 Playoffs.
