= Takumi Murakami =

Japanese footballer

Takumi Murakami 村上 巧
Personal information
- Full name: Takumi Murakami
- Date of birth: September 12, 1989 (age 37)
- Place of birth: Kanagawa, Japan
- Height: 1.76 m (5 ft 9 1/2 in)
- Position: Midfielder

Team information
- Current team: Ococias Kyoto AC
- Number: 8

Youth career
- 2008–2011: Ritsumeikan University

Senior career*
Years	Team	Apps	(Gls)
2012–2015	Ehime FC	106	(3)
2016–2019	Roasso Kumamoto	60	(0)
2020–	Ococias Kyoto AC		
- * Club domestic league appearances and goals as of 23 February 2020

Takumi Murakami (村上 巧, Murakami Takumi; born September 12, 1989) is a Japanese football player.

== Career statistics ==
Updated to 23 February 2020.

Appearances and goals by club, season and competition
Club	Season	League			Emperor's Cup		Total	
Club	Season	Division	Apps	Goals	Apps	Goals	Apps	Goals
Ehime FC	2012	J2 League	38	1	1	0	39	1
Ehime FC	2013	J2 League	38	1	0	0	38	1
Ehime FC	2014	J2 League	17	1	2	0	19	1
Ehime FC	2015	J2 League	8	0	2	0	10	0
Roasso Kumamoto	2016	J2 League	11	0	0	0	11	0
Roasso Kumamoto	2017	J2 League	26	0	1	0	27	0
Roasso Kumamoto	2018	J2 League	12	0	0	0	13	0
Roasso Kumamoto	2019	J3 League	11	0	1	1	12	1
Total			161	3	7	1	168	4
