= Shingo Arizono =

Japanese football player

Shingo Arizono 有薗 真吾
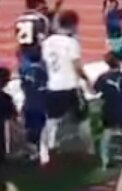

Personal information
- Full name: Shingo Arizono
- Date of birth: December 4, 1985 (age 40)
- Place of birth: Kagoshima, Japan
- Height: 1.76 m (5 ft 9 1/2 in)
- Position: Defender

Youth career
- 2004–2007: Fukuoka University of Economics
- 2008: Thespa Kusatsu U-23

Senior career*
Years	Team	Apps	(Gls)
2009–2015	Thespakusatsu Gunma	97	(3)
2016	Machida Zelvia	5	(0)
2017	Blaublitz Akita	32	(5)
2018	Giravanz Kitakyushu	22	(0)
2019	Nara Club	15	(1)
2020	Ococias Kyoto AC	2	(0)
- * Club domestic league appearances and goals as of 22 February 2021

Shingo Arizono (有薗 真吾, Arizono Shingo; born December 4, 1985) is a former Japanese football player who last played for Ococias Kyoto AC.

== Club statistics ==
Updated to 19 January 2019.

Club performance			League		Cup		League Cup		Total	
Season	Club	League	Apps	Goals	Apps	Goals	Apps	Goals	Apps	Goals
Japan			League		Emperor's Cup		J. League Cup		Total	
2009	Thespa Kusatsu	J2 League	10	1	2	0	-		12	1
2010	Thespa Kusatsu	J2 League	14	0	1	0	-		15	1
2011	Thespa Kusatsu	J2 League	12	1	1	0	-		13	1
2012	Thespa Kusatsu	J2 League	13	0	1	0	-		14	0
2013	Thespakusatsu Gunma	J2 League	18	1	0	0	-		18	1
2014	Thespakusatsu Gunma	J2 League	11	0	2	0	-		13	0
2015	Thespakusatsu Gunma	J2 League	19	0	0	0	-		19	0
2016	Machida Zelvia	J2 League	5	0	1	0	-		6	0
2017	Blaublitz Akita	J3 League	32	5	1	0	-		33	5
2018	Giravanz Kitakyushu	J3 League	22	0	-		-		22	0
2019	Nara Club	JFL					-			
Career total			156	8	9	0	0	0	165	8

== Honours ==
Blaublitz Akita

- J3 League (1): 2017
