= Asuki Oishi =

Japanese footballer

Personal information
- Full name: Asuki Oishi
- Date of birth: December 14, 1991 (age 34)
- Place of birth: Shizuoka, Japan
- Height: 1.85 m (6 ft 1 in)
- Position: Midfielder

Youth career
- Hamamatsu University

Senior career*
Years	Team	Apps	(Gls)
2013–2015	Zweigen Kanazawa	27	(5)
Total		27	(5)
- * Club domestic league appearances and goals

Asuki Oishi (大石 明日希, Ōishi Asuki; born December 14, 1991) is a former Japanese football player.

== Playing career ==
Asuki Oishi played for Zweigen Kanazawa from 2013 to 2015.
