= Nobushige Tabata =

Japanese footballer

Personal information
- Full name: Nobushige Tabata
- Date of birth: 9 April 1989 (age 37)
- Place of birth: Shiroi, Chiba, Japan
- Height: 1.82 m (6 ft 0 in)
- Position: Goalkeeper

Team information
- Current team: Renofa Yamaguchi FC
- Number: 16

Youth career
- 2008–2011: Aoyama Gakuin University

Senior career*
Years	Team	Apps	(Gls)
2012–2014	Sagawa Printing Kyoto	28	(0)
2015	Grulla Morioka	13	(0)
2016–	Renofa Yamaguchi FC		
- * Club domestic league appearances and goals as of 23 February 2016

Nobushige Tabata (田端信成, Tabata Nobushige; born 9 April 1989) is a Japanese footballer who plays for Renofa Yamaguchi.

== Club statistics ==
Updated to 23 February 2016.

Club performance			League		Cup		Total	
Season	Club	League	Apps	Goals	Apps	Goals	Apps	Goals
Japan			League		Emperor's Cup		Total	
2012	Sagawa Printing	JFL	2	0	–		2	0
2013	Sagawa Printing	JFL	13	0	0	0	13	0
2014	Sagawa Printing Kyoto	JFL	13	0	–		13	0
2015	Grulla Morioka	J3 League	13	0	0	0	13	0
2016	Renofa Yamaguchi FC	J2 League	0	0	0	0	0	0
Career total			41	0	0	0	41	0
