= Palhinha =

Palhinha may refer to:

- Palhinha (footballer, born 1950) (1950–2023), Vanderlei Eustáquio de Oliveira, Brazilian footballer
- Palhinha (footballer, born 1967), Jorge Ferreira da Silva, Brazilian retired footballer
- João Palhinha (born 1995), Portuguese professional footballer
