= Ricardinho (footballer, born March 1989) =

Brazilian footballer

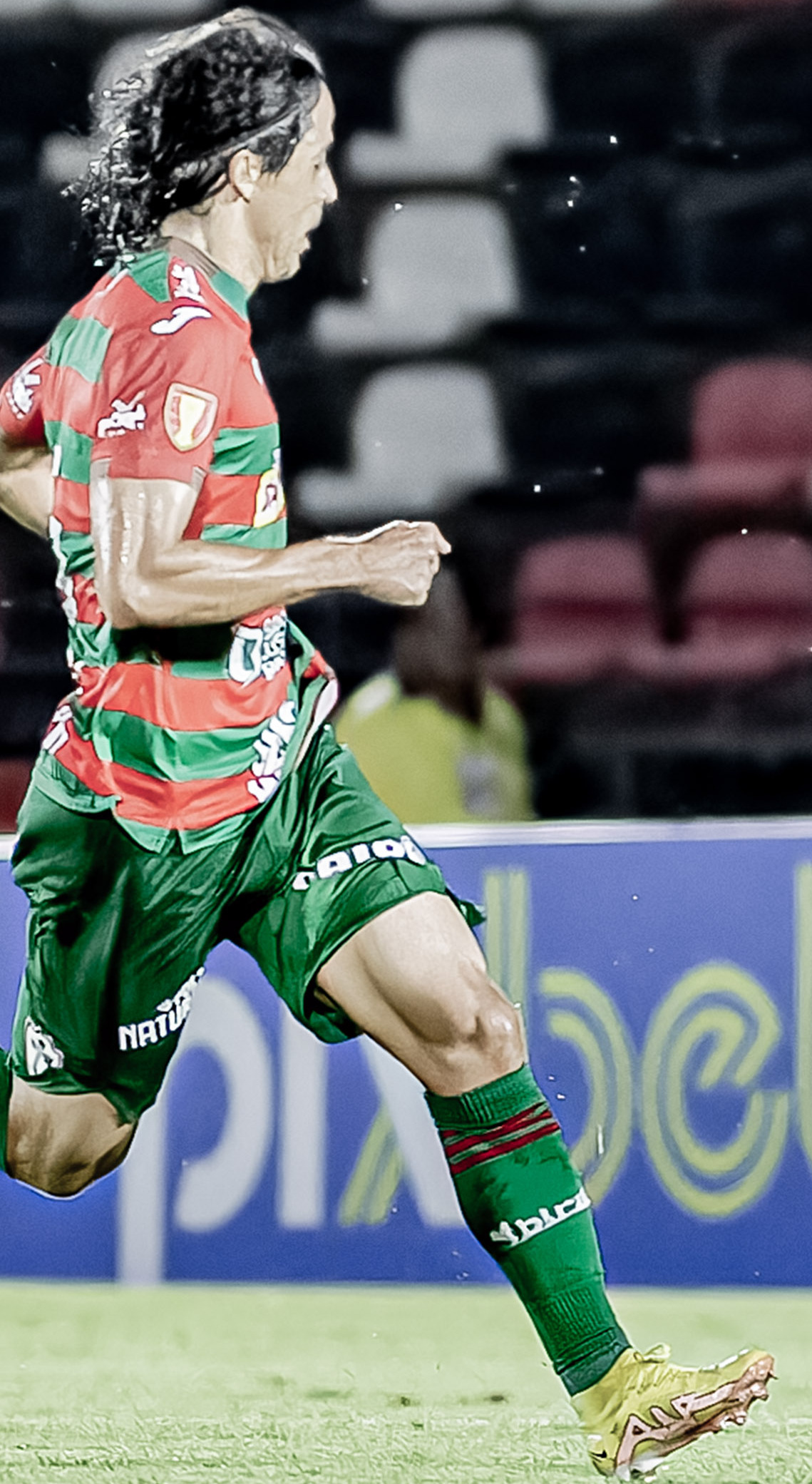
- Ricardinho with Portuguesa in 2024

Personal information
- Full name: Ricardo Ribeiro de Lima
- Date of birth: 27 March 1989 (age 37)
- Place of birth: Itaberaí, Brazil
- Height: 1.74 m (5 ft 9 in)
- Position: Defensive midfielder

Team information
- Current team: Ferroviária
- Number: 5

Youth career
- Goiás

Senior career*
Years	Team	Apps	(Gls)
2008–2009	Goiás	3	(0)
2010	Rio Branco-SP	5	(0)
2011–2012	Vila Nova	84	(6)
2013	Avaí	40	(2)
2014	Rio Branco-PR	8	(0)
2014–2015	Paraná	63	(5)
2016–2017	Criciúma	82	(4)
2018–2020	Guarani	97	(4)
2020–2021	Sport Recife	35	(0)
2021–2022	Juventude	16	(0)
2022	Operário Ferroviário	31	(1)
2023	Novorizontino	33	(0)
2024	Portuguesa	13	(0)
2024–	Ferroviária	86	(2)
- * Club domestic league appearances and goals as of 9 November 2026

Ricardo Ribeiro de Lima (born 27 March 1989), commonly known as Ricardinho, is a Brazilian professional footballer who plays as a defensive midfielder for Ferroviária.

== Club career ==
Ricardinho was born in Itaberaí, Goiás, and was a Goiás youth graduate. He made his first team debut on 30 January 2008, starting in a 1–0 Campeonato Goiano away win against CRAC.

Mainly assigned to the under-20 squad, Ricardinho only made his Série A debut on 15 November 2009, coming on as a late substitute for Léo Lima in a 3–1 home win against Santo André. After being rarely used, he moved to Rio Branco-SP for the 2010 campaign.

After again featuring sparingly, Ricardinho returned to his native state and joined Série B side Vila Nova in October 2010. A regular starter during his two-year spell, he agreed to a contract with Avaí in December 2012.

Ricardinho began the 2014 campaign with Rio Branco-PR, later moving to Paraná, where he established himself as a regular starter in the right back. On 13 January 2016, after being deemed surplus to requirements by the latter club, he joined Criciúma.

Ricardinho was presented at Guarani on 21 December 2017, immediately becoming a starter and scoring the winning goal of the 2018 Campeonato Paulista Série A2 final against XV de Piracicaba. On 19 November 2018, he renewed his contract until December 2020.

On 3 August 2020, after appearing rarely during the season, Ricardinho moved to top-tier side Sport Recife. On 5 August of the following year, he joined Juventude also in the first division.

On 4 April 2022, after featuring rarely during the year, Ricardinho agreed to a deal with Operário Ferroviário in the second level. On 2 December, after suffering relegation, he moved to Novorizontino.

On 28 December 2023, Ricardinho was announced at Portuguesa for the 2024 Campeonato Paulista.

== Career statistics ==
As of 18 March 2024

Club	Season	League			State League		Cup		Continental		Other		Total	
Club	Season	Division	Apps	Goals	Apps	Goals	Apps	Goals	Apps	Goals	Apps	Goals	Apps	Goals
Goiás	2009	Série A	0	0	2	0	0	0	—		—		2	0
Goiás	2010	Série A	1	0	0	0	0	0	—		—		1	0
Goiás	Total		1	0	2	0	0	0	—		—		3	0
Rio Branco-SP	2010	Paulista	—		5	0	—		—		—		5	0
Vila Nova	2011	Série B	33	4	15	1	—		—		—		48	5
Vila Nova	2012	Série C	17	1	19	0	—		—		—		36	1
Vila Nova	Total		50	5	34	1	—		—		—		84	6
Avaí	2013	Série B	28	0	12	2	2	0	—		—		42	2
Rio Branco-PR	2014	Paranaense	—		8	0	—		—		—		8	0
Paraná	2014	Série B	18	0	—		2	0	—		—		20	0
Paraná	2015	Série B	32	2	13	3	2	0	—		—		47	5
Paraná	Total		50	2	13	3	4	0	—		—		67	5
Criciúma	2016	Série B	22	1	15	0	0	0	—		3 (Note: Appearance(s) in Primeira Liga)	0	40	1
Criciúma	2017	Série B	32	0	13	3	2	0	—		0	0	47	3
Criciúma	Total		54	1	28	3	2	0	—		3	0	87	4
Guarani	2018	Série B	35	2	17	1	—		—		—		52	3
Guarani	2019	Série B	31	1	13	0	1	0	—		—		45	1
Guarani	2020	Série B	0	0	1	0	0	0	—		—		1	0
Guarani	Total		66	3	31	1	1	0	—		—		98	4
Sport Recife	2020	Série A	26	0	—		—		—		—		26	0
Sport Recife	2021	Série A	6	0	3	0	1	0	—		6 (Note: Appearance(s) in Copa do Nordeste)	0	16	0
Sport Recife	Total		32	0	3	0	1	0	—		6	0	42	0
Juventude	2021	Série A	12	0	—		—		—		—		12	0
Juventude	2022	Série A	0	0	4	0	2	0	—		—		6	0
Juventude	Total		12	0	4	0	2	0	—		—		18	0
Operário Ferroviário	2022	Série B	31	1	—		—		—		—		31	1
Novorizontino	2023	Série B	19	0	14	0	—		—		—		33	0
Portuguesa	2024	Paulista	—		13	0	—		—		—		13	0
Career total			343	12	167	10	12	0	0	0	9	0	531	22

== Honours ==
Guarani

- Campeonato Paulista Série A2: 2018
