= Ryota Noguchi =

Japanese footballer (born 1986)

Ryota Noguchi 野口 遼太
Personal information
- Full name: Ryota Noguchi
- Date of birth: June 24, 1986 (age 40)
- Place of birth: Kagawa, Japan
- Height: 1.81 m (5 ft 11 1/2 in)
- Position: Defender

Team information
- Current team: Suzuka Point Getters
- Number: 19

Youth career
- 2005–2008: Osaka Sangyo University

Senior career*
Years	Team	Apps	(Gls)
2008–2010	Tokushima Vortis Second	28	(16)
2011–2015	Kamatamare Sanuki	85	(6)
2016	Suzuka Unlimited FC	14	(6)
2017	Veertien Mie	30	(0)
2018–	Suzuka Unlimited FC	43	(4)
- * Club domestic league appearances and goals as of 1 January 2020

Ryota Noguchi (野口 遼太, Noguchi Ryota; born June 24, 1986) is a Japanese football player for Suzuka Point Getters.

== Playing career ==
Ryota Noguchi played for Kamatamare Sanuki from 2011 to 2015. In 2016, he moved to Suzuka Unlimited FC.

== Club statistics ==
Updated to 1 January 2020.

Club performance			League		Cup		Total	
Season	Club	League	Apps	Goals	Apps	Goals	Apps	Goals
Japan			League		Emperor's Cup		Total	
2011	Kamatamare Sanuki	JFL	20	2	0	0	20	2
2012	Kamatamare Sanuki	JFL	18	1	2	0	20	1
2013	Kamatamare Sanuki	JFL	33	3	1	0	34	3
2014	Kamatamare Sanuki	J2 League	14	0	0	0	14	0
2015	Kamatamare Sanuki	J2 League	0	0	0	0	0	0
2016	Suzuka Unlimited FC	JRL (Tōkai)	14	6	2	0	16	6
2017	Veertien Mie	JFL	30	0	–		30	0
2018	Suzuka Unlimited FC	JRL (Tōkai)	14	2	1	0	15	2
2019	Suzuka Unlimited FC	JFL	29	2	–		29	2
Total			172	16	6	0	178	16
