= Ryan (footballer, born 1992) =

Brazilian footballer

Personal information
- Full name: Ryan do Nascimento Ramos
- Date of birth: 1 April 1992 (age 34)
- Place of birth: Rio de Janeiro, Brazil
- Height: 1.81 m (5 ft 11 1/2 in)
- Position: Midfielder

Team information
- Current team: São Gonçalo

Youth career
- Figueirense

Senior career*
Years	Team	Apps	(Gls)
2012	Figueirense	2	(0)
2013–2016	Madureira	67	(3)
2016–2017	União da Madeira	24	(0)
2018	Vila Nova	8	(0)
2018–2019	Madureira	1	(0)
2019	→ Itumbiara (loan)	8	(1)
2020	Palmas	7	(1)
2020–	São Gonçalo	6	(0)
- * Club domestic league appearances and goals as of 18:20, 18 October 2020 (UTC)

Ryan do Nascimento Ramos, known as Ryan (born 1 April 1992) is a Brazilian football player who plays for São Gonçalo.

== Club career ==
He made his professional debut in the Campeonato Brasileiro Série A for Figueirense on 25 November 2012 in a game against Grêmio.
