= Kenji Dai =

Japanese football player

Kenji Dai 代健司
Personal information
- Full name: Kenji Dai
- Date of birth: March 27, 1989 (age 37)
- Place of birth: Hiroshima, Japan
- Height: 1.77 m (5 ft 9 1/2 in)
- Position: Defender

Team information
- Current team: Tegevajaro Miyazaki
- Number: 3

Youth career
- 2001–2003: Hiroshima Oko FC
- 2004–2006: Hiroshima Kanon High School

College career
Years	Team	Apps	(Gls)
2007–2010	Fukuoka University		

Senior career*
Years	Team	Apps	(Gls)
2011–2012	Mito HollyHock	13	(0)
2013–2015	Ehime FC	60	(1)
2015	→ Renofa Yamaguchi (loan)	17	(1)
2016–2019	Kataller Toyama	96	(7)
2020–	Tegevajaro Miyazaki	68+	(2+)
- * Club domestic league appearances and goals as of 17:42, 20 September 2023

Kenji Dai (代 健司, born March 27, 1989) is a Japanese football player who currently plays as a defender for Tegevajaro Miyazaki.

== Club statistics ==
Updated to 20 February 2020.

Club performance			League		Cup		Total	
Season	Club	League	Apps	Goals	Apps	Goals	Apps	Goals
Japan			League		Emperor's Cup		Total	
2011	Mito HollyHock	J2 League	5	0	2	0	7	0
2012	Mito HollyHock	J2 League	8	0	1	1	9	1
2013	Ehime FC	J2 League	32	1	1	0	33	1
2014	Ehime FC	J2 League	24	0	3	0	27	0
2015	Ehime FC	J2 League	4	0	-		4	0
2015	Renofa Yamaguchi	J3 League	17	1	1	0	18	1
2016	Kataller Toyama	J3 League	29	4	2	0	31	4
2017	Kataller Toyama	J3 League	21	1	2	0	23	1
2018	Kataller Toyama	J3 League	27	2	1	0	28	2
2019	Kataller Toyama	J3 League	19	0	0	0	19	0
Total			186	9	13	1	199	10
