= Dudu (footballer, born 1991) =

Brazilian footballer

Personal information
- Full name: Eduardo Rodrigues Souza
- Date of birth: September 20, 1991 (age 35)
- Place of birth: Guararapes, Brazil
- Height: 1.84 m (6 ft 0 in)
- Position: Forward

Team information
- Current team: São Gonçalo EC

Youth career
- 2009–2010: Flamengo

Senior career*
Years	Team	Apps	(Gls)
2011	Corinthians Alagoano		
2011–2013	Beira-Mar	12	(1)
2014	Rio Claro	0	(0)
2014–2017	Bonsucesso		
2015	→ CRB (loan)	0	(0)
2016	→ Tupi (loan)	0	(0)
2017	→ Bangu (loan)		
2018	Dugopolje	3	(0)
2019–	São Gonçalo EC		
- * Club domestic league appearances and goals as of 17:03, 15 November 2019 (UTC)

Eduardo Rodrigues Souza (born September 20, 1991), known as Dudu, is a Brazilian footballer who plays as a forward for São Gonçalo Esporte Clube.

== Career ==
Dudu was born in Guararapes. As a young player, he was considered a promising talent when playing in the junior squads of Flamengo, but was not rewarded with a contract and ended up with Corinthians Alagoano (not to be confused with the more illustrious Corinthians of São Paulo). He then went on loan to Beira-Mar in Portugal.
