= Takayuki Fukumura =

Japanese footballer

Takayuki Fukumura 福村 貴幸
Personal information
- Full name: Takayuki Fukumura
- Date of birth: December 22, 1991 (age 34)
- Place of birth: Hirakata, Osaka, Japan
- Height: 1.77 m (5 ft 9 1/2 in)
- Position: Defender

Youth career
- –2003: Mythos SC
- 2004–2006: FC Green Wave
- 2007–2009: Osaka Tōin High School

Senior career*
Years	Team	Apps	(Gls)
2010–2015	Kyoto Sanga	115	(2)
2015	→ Shimizu S-Pulse (loan)	14	(0)
2016–2017	Shimizu S-Pulse	13	(0)
2017	→ FC Gifu (loan)	38	(1)
2018	FC Gifu	35	(0)
2019	Gainare Tottori	32	(0)
2020–2021	Tokyo Verdy	68	(0)
2022–2024	FC Ryukyu	66	(2)
Medal record
Kyoto Sanga FC
Runner-up	Emperor's Cup	2011
- * Club domestic league appearances and goals

Takayuki Fukumura (福村 貴幸, Fukumura Takayuki; born December 22, 1991) is a Japanese former footballer who played as a defender.

A mainstay of the J2 League with 300 league appearances, Fukumura is primarily known for his time at Kyoto Sanga.

== Career ==
On 30 October 2009, Fukumura was announced at Kyoto Sanga after initially training with Kawasaki Frontale.

On 25 March 2015, Fukumura was announced at Shimizu S-Pulse on a one year loan spell. During the 2015 season, he aimed to make his first start in the J1 League after performing well in a cup match against Yokohama FC, being praised by his manager Katsumi Oenoki. At the end of the 2015 season, he joined the club on a permanent transfer.

On 28 December 2016, Fukumura was announced at FC Gifu on a one year loan spell.

On 6 January 2018, Fukumura was announced at FC Gifu on a permanent transfer. On 6 December 2018, the club announced that they would not be extending his contract for the 2019 season.

On 9 January 2019, Fukumura was announced at Gainare Tottori on a permanent transfer. He was announced as one of three vice-captains during the season.

On 9 January 2020, Fukumura was announced at Tokyo Verdy on a permanent transfer. On 4 December 2021, the club announced they would not be extending his contract with the club for the 2022 season.

On 4 January 2022, Fukumura was announced at FC Ryukyu on a permanent transfer. During the 2022 season, he made 32 league appearances.

On 22 December 2024, Fukumura announced his retirement from football.

== Career statistics ==
Updated to 2 January 2020.

Club	Season	League		Emperor's Cup		J. League Cup		Total	
Club	Season	Apps	Goals	Apps	Goals	Apps	Goals	Apps	Goals
Kyoto Sanga	2010	0	0	0	0	0	0	0	0
Kyoto Sanga	2011	19	0	6	0	-		25	0
Kyoto Sanga	2012	37	0	2	0	-		39	0
Kyoto Sanga	2013	41	1	2	0	-		43	1
Kyoto Sanga	2014	18	1	2	0	-		20	1
Kyoto Sanga	2015	0	0	-		-		0	0
Shimizu S-Pulse	2015	14	0	1	0	4	0	19	0
Shimizu S-Pulse	2016	13	0	3	0	-		16	0
FC Gifu	2017	38	1	2	1	-		40	2
FC Gifu	2018	35	0	1	0	-		36	0
Gainare Tottori	2019	32	0	1	0	-		33	0
Career total		247	3	20	1	4	0	271	4
