= Daiki Tomii =

Japanese footballer (born 1989)

Daiki Tomii 富居大樹
Personal information
- Full name: Daiki Tomii
- Date of birth: August 27, 1989 (age 37)
- Place of birth: Saitama, Japan
- Height: 1.84 m (6 ft 1/2 in)
- Position: Goalkeeper

Team information
- Current team: Shonan Bellmare
- Number: 23

Youth career
- Urawa Kizaki SSS
- 2003–2005: Urawa Red Diamonds
- 2006–2008: Bunan High School

College career
Years	Team	Apps	(Gls)
2009–2012	Tokyo International University		

Senior career*
Years	Team	Apps	(Gls)
2013–2015	Thespakusatsu Gunma	61	(0)
2016–2017	Montedio Yamagata	5	(0)
2018–	Shonan Bellmare	28	(0)
Medal record
Shonan Bellmare
Winner	J.League Cup	2018
- * Club domestic league appearances and goals as of 7 August 2022

Daiki Tomii (富居 大樹, Tomii Daiki; born August 27, 1989 in Saitama) is a Japanese football player for Shonan Bellmare as a goalkeeper.

== Career statistics ==
Updated to 7 August 2022.

Appearances and goals by club, season and competition
Club	Season	League			Emperor's Cup		J.League Cup		Total	
Club	Season	Division	Apps	Goals	Apps	Goals	Apps	Goals	Apps	Goals
Thespakusatsu Gunma	2013	J2 League	0	0	0	0	—		0	0
Thespakusatsu Gunma	2014	J2 League	21	0	3	0	—		24	0
Thespakusatsu Gunma	2015	J2 League	40	0	0	0	—		40	0
Montedio Yamagata	2016	J2 League	1	0	2	0	—		3	0
Montedio Yamagata	2017	J2 League	4	0	1	0	—		5	0
Shonan Bellmare	2018	J1 League	0	0	2	0	2	0	4	0
Shonan Bellmare	2019	J1 League	4	0	0	0	6	0	10	0
Shonan Bellmare	2020	J1 League	6	0	—		2	0	8	0
Shonan Bellmare	2021	J1 League	4	0	1	0	8	0	13	0
Shonan Bellmare	2022	J1 League	2	0	0	0	4	0	6	0
Career total			82	0	9	0	22	0	113	0
