= Bruno Silva (footballer, born 1994) =

Portuguese footballer

Personal information
- Full name: Bruno Rodrigo Ferreira da Silva
- Date of birth: 26 January 1994 (age 32)
- Place of birth: Lourosa, Portugal
- Height: 1.85 m (6 ft 1 in)
- Position: Defender

Youth career
- 2004–2009: Porto
- 2009–2010: Padroense
- 2010–2013: Porto
- 2011–2012: → Nacional (loan)

Senior career*
Years	Team	Apps	(Gls)
2012–2014	Porto B	1	(0)
2014–2015	Ribeirão	14	(0)
2015–2016	Anadia	12	(0)
2017	Cesarense	12	(0)
2017–2018	Valadares Gaia	29	(2)
2018–2019	Fiães	34	(6)
2019–2020	Grijó	30	(1)
- * Club domestic league appearances and goals as of 19:26, 21 November 2021 (UTC)

Bruno Rodrigo Ferreira da Silva (born 26 January 1994) is a Portuguese footballer who plays as a defender.

== Career ==
Born in Lourosa, Santa Maria da Feira, Silva came through the ranks of FC Porto. He was an unused substitute for the reserves in the Segunda Liga during the 2012–13 season. In January 2014, he was one of three reserves called up by manager Paulo Fonseca to train with the first team. On 11 May 2014, Silva made his only professional appearance for Porto B, coming on in added time for Gonçalo Paciência in a 1–0 win at Atlético Clube de Portugal on the final day.
