= Célio Silva =

Brazilian footballer and manager (born 1968)

Personal information
- Full name: Vagno Célio do Nascimento Silva
- Date of birth: 20 May 1968 (age 58)
- Place of birth: Miracema, RJ, Brazil
- Position: Centre back

Senior career*
| Years | Team | Apps | (Gls) |
| 1986–1988 | Americano | | |
| 1988–1990 | Vasco de Gama | 47 | (1) |
| 1991–1993 | Internacional | 26 | (0) |
| 1993–1994 | Caen | 34 | (1) |
| 1994–1998 | Corinthians | 47 | (7) |
| 1998 | Goiás | 20 | (0) |
| 1999 | Flamengo | 8 | (1) |
| 2000 | Atlético Mineiro | 10 | (0) |
| 2001 | Universidad Católica | 8 | (0) |
| 2003 | Americano | 0 | (0) |

International career^{‡}
| 1992–1997 | Brazil | 11 | (0) |

Managerial career
- 2009: Tupy
- 2010: São Mateus
- 2010: Londrina
- * Club domestic league appearances and goals as of 08:40, 22 July 2008 (UTC) ‡ National team caps and goals as of 08:40, 22 July 2008 (UTC)

Vagno Célio do Nascimento Silva (born 20 May 1968) is a Brazilian former football defender, who retired from professional football in 2003.

He was nicknamed by fans "O Canhão do Brasileirão" (The Cannon of the Brazilian Championship) for his extremely potent right-foot shot. One of his shots was measured at 136 km/h (84.5 mph) during a test organized by Globo Esporte.

== Playing career ==
Revealed in the small Americano - RJ in 1986, he won the Brazilian Championship playing for Vasco da Gama in 1989.

He got famous after scoring the goal (shooting a penalty) that gave the Copa do Brasil (Cup of Brazil) title for Internacional - RS at 1992.

The defender also played for Flamengo, Atlético Mineiro and Universidad Católica de Chile, between others. But it was in Corinthians that he achieved more titles in his career.

While at Corinthians, Célio Silva agreed a £4 million move to Premier League champions Manchester United in July 1997. However, United could not obtain a work permit, as the Home Office claimed that, despite Silva being a regular for Brazil for the past two years, he hadn't played enough matches for Brazil, and the move fell through. United bought Henning Berg instead.

He represented Brazil national football team in 11 matches, winning the Copa América title in 1997.

== Honours ==
=== Club ===
- Copa União: 1987
- Brazilian Championship: 1989
- Campeonato Carioca: 1988, 1999
- Campeonato Gaúcho: 1991, 1992
- Copa do Brasil: 1992, 1995
- Campeonato Paulista: 1995, 1997
- Copa Mercosur: 1999
- Campeonato Mineiro: 2000
- Ramon de Carranza Trophy: 1988, 1989, 1996

=== International ===
- Copa América: 1997
