= Thiago (footballer, born September 1988) =

Brazilian footballer

Personal information
- Full name: Thiago de Lima
- Date of birth: September 25, 1988 (age 38)
- Place of birth: Brazil
- Height: 1.79 m (5 ft 10 1/2 in)
- Position: Midfielder

Senior career*
Years	Team	Apps	(Gls)
2008	Santo André		
2009	Guarulhos		
2010	Varginha		
2011	Patrocinense		
2011	Santo André		
2012	Patrocinense		
2013	URT		
2013	Diadema		
2014	Tricordiano		
2014	Diadema		
2015	Jacuipense		
2015	Primavera		
2016	Thespakusatsu Gunma		
2017	Jacuipense		
- * Club domestic league appearances and goals

Thiago de Lima (born September 25, 1988) is a Brazilian football player.
