= Bruno Silva (footballer, born 1992) =

Brazilian footballer

Personal information
- Full name: Bruno da Silva Fonseca
- Date of birth: 14 September 1992 (age 34)
- Place of birth: Salvador, Brazil
- Height: 1.70 m (5 ft 7 in)
- Position: Left-back

Senior career*
Years	Team	Apps	(Gls)
2012	Contagem		
2013–2015	Jacuipense	23	(1)
2015–2017	Gil Vicente	41	(1)
2017–2020	Moreirense	13	(0)
2020	→ Felgueiras (loan)	5	(0)
2020–2022	Mafra	48	(1)
2023	Vilafranquense	8	(0)
2023–2026	Feirense	52	(1)
- * Club domestic league appearances and goals as of 19 June 2026

Bruno da Silva Fonseca (born 14 September 1992), known as Bruno Silva, is a Brazilian professional footballer who plays as a left-back.

== Club career ==
He made his professional debut in the Segunda Liga for Gil Vicente on 31 October 2015 in a game against Olhanense.

On 5 January 2023, Silva signed with Vilafranquense.

On 6 October 2023, Silva joined Liga Portugal 2 club Feirense, signing a contract until the end of the 2023–24 season.

== Honours ==
Moreirense

- Taça da Liga: 2016–17
