= Valdeir =

Valdeir may refer to:

- Valdeir Vieira (born 1944), Brazilian football manager
- Valdeir (footballer, born 1967), full name Valdeir Celso Moreira, Brazilian football striker and midfielder
- Valdeir (footballer, born 1977), full name Valdeir da Silva Santos, Brazilian football forward
