= 2018 Vegalta Sendai season =

Vegalta Sendai
2018 season
- Chairman: Nishikawa Yoshihisa
- Manager: Susumu Watanabe
- Stadium: Yurtec Stadium Sendai
- J1 League: 11th
- J.League Cup: play-offs
- Emperor's Cup: runner up
- Top goalscorer: League: Nishimura; All: Nishimura
Home colours	Away colours

In 2018, Vegalta Sendai competed in the J1 League, the top tier of Japanese football. It was the club's eighth consecutive season in this competition. They also competed in the J.League Cup and reached the semi-finals of the Emperor's Cup.

== Squad ==
As of 14 January 2018.

Note: Flags indicate national team as defined under FIFA eligibility rules; some limited exceptions apply. Players may hold more than one non-FIFA nationality.

No.	Pos.	Nation	Player
1	GK	JPN	Daniel Schmidt
2	DF	JPN	Katsuya Nagato
4	DF	JPN	Koji Hachisuka
6	DF	JPN	Ko Itakura (on loan from Kawasaki Frontale)
7	MF	JPN	Hiroaki Okuno
8	MF	JPN	Yoshihiro Shoji
9	FW	JPN	Sota Hirayama
10	MF	PRK	Ryang Yong-gi
11	FW	JPN	Naoki Ishihara
13	DF	JPN	Yasuhiro Hiraoka
14	MF	JPN	Jun Kanakubo
16	MF	JPN	Gakuto Notsuda (on loan from Sanfrecce Hiroshima)
17	MF	JPN	Shingo Tomita
19	FW	JPN	Ryo Germain

No.	Pos.	Nation	Player
20	FW	JPN	Takuma Abe
21	GK	JPN	Kentaro Seki
22	GK	JPN	Goro Kawanami
23	MF	JPN	Yoshihiro Nakano
25	MF	JPN	Naoki Sugai
27	DF	JPN	Kazuki Oiwa
29	MF	JPN	Shota Kobayashi
30	FW	JPN	Takuma Nishimura
31	MF	JPN	Shunsuke Motegi
33	DF	JPN	Masato Tokida
34	MF	JPN	Keiya Shiihashi
35	GK	KOR	Lee Yu-noh
39	DF	KOR	Kim Jung-ya
40	MF	JPN	Kunimitsu Sekiguchi

== J1 League ==
=== League table ===
Pos	Team	Pld	W	D	L	GF	GA	GD	Pts
9	Gamba Osaka	34	14	6	14	41	46	−5	48
10	Vissel Kobe	34	12	9	13	45	52	−7	45
11	Vegalta Sendai	34	13	6	15	44	54	−10	45
12	Yokohama F. Marinos	34	12	5	17	56	56	0	41
13	Shonan Bellmare	34	10	11	13	38	43	−5	41

Source: Meiji Yasuda J1 League
Rules for classification: 1) Points; 2) Goal difference; 3) Goals scored

=== Match details ===
J1 League match details
Match	Date	Team	Score	Team	Venue	Attendance
1	2018.02.25	Vegalta Sendai	1–0	Kashiwa Reysol	Yurtec Stadium Sendai	15,655
2	2018.03.03	FC Tokyo	0–1	Vegalta Sendai	Ajinomoto Stadium	16,990
3	2018.03.10	Vegalta Sendai	1–1	Vissel Kobe	Yurtec Stadium Sendai	14,270
4	2018.03.18	Shimizu S-Pulse	1–1	Vegalta Sendai	IAI Stadium Nihondaira	13,965
5	2018.03.31	Vegalta Sendai	1–0	V-Varen Nagasaki	Yurtec Stadium Sendai	13,158
6	2018.04.07	Urawa Reds	1–0	Vegalta Sendai	Saitama Stadium 2002	28,984
7	2018.04.11	Nagoya Grampus	2–3	Vegalta Sendai	Paloma Mizuho Stadium	9,297
8	2018.04.14	Vegalta Sendai	0–0	Kawasaki Frontale	Yurtec Stadium Sendai	14,024
9	2018.04.21	Vegalta Sendai	0–3	Júbilo Iwata	Yurtec Stadium Sendai	13,316
10	2018.04.25	Cerezo Osaka	2–1	Vegalta Sendai	Kincho Stadium	8,165
11	2018.04.28	Vegalta Sendai	2–2	Hokkaido Consadole Sapporo	Yurtec Stadium Sendai	13,812
12	2018.05.02	Gamba Osaka	1–0	Vegalta Sendai	Panasonic Stadium Suita	11,824
13	2018.05.06	Shonan Bellmare	1–3	Vegalta Sendai	Shonan BMW Stadium Hiratsuka	11,805
14	2018.05.12	Vegalta Sendai	1–3	Sanfrecce Hiroshima	Yurtec Stadium Sendai	15,115
15	2018.05.20	Kashima Antlers	1–2	Vegalta Sendai	Kashima Soccer Stadium	23,942
16	2018.07.18	Vegalta Sendai	2–8	Yokohama F. Marinos	Yurtec Stadium Sendai	13,081
17	2018.07.22	Sagan Tosu	0–1	Vegalta Sendai	Best Amenity Stadium	17,537
18	2018.07.28	Vegalta Sendai	2–2	Cerezo Osaka	Yurtec Stadium Sendai	14,911
19	2018.08.01	Vegalta Sendai	1–2	Nagoya Grampus	Yurtec Stadium Sendai	13,968
20	2018.08.05	Júbilo Iwata	3–2	Vegalta Sendai	Yamaha Stadium	12,496
21	2018.08.11	Kashiwa Reysol	0–2	Vegalta Sendai	Sankyo Frontier Kashiwa Stadium	12,666
22	2018.08.15	Vegalta Sendai	4–1	Shonan Bellmare	Yurtec Stadium Sendai	16,892
23	2018.08.19	Vegalta Sendai	2–1	Gamba Osaka	Yurtec Stadium Sendai	16,110
24	2018.08.25	Kawasaki Frontale	1–0	Vegalta Sendai	Kawasaki Todoroki Stadium	23,816
25	2018.09.01	Vegalta Sendai	2–1	Shimizu S-Pulse	Yurtec Stadium Sendai	14,293
26	2018.09.15	Vegalta Sendai	1–0	FC Tokyo	Yurtec Stadium Sendai	17,887
27	2018.09.22	V-Varen Nagasaki	1–0	Vegalta Sendai	Transcosmos Stadium Nagasaki	9,990
28	2018.09.29	Yokohama F. Marinos	5–2	Vegalta Sendai	NHK Spring Mitsuzawa Football Stadium	8,688
29	2018.10.07	Vegalta Sendai	1–1	Urawa Reds	Yurtec Stadium Sendai	18,276
30	2018.10.20	Vegalta Sendai	2–3	Sagan Tosu	Yurtec Stadium Sendai	18,023
31	2018.11.04	Hokkaido Consadole Sapporo	1–0	Vegalta Sendai	Sapporo Dome	24,065
32	2018.11.10	Sanfrecce Hiroshima	0–1	Vegalta Sendai	Edion Stadium Hiroshima	13,091
33	2018.11.24	Vegalta Sendai	0–3	Kashima Antlers	Yurtec Stadium Sendai	19,152
34	2018.12.01	Vissel Kobe	3–2	Vegalta Sendai	Noevir Stadium Kobe	24,517

== Emperor's Cup ==
Match	Date	Team	Score	Team	Venue	Attendance
2nd round	2018.06.06	Vegalta Sendai	4-0	Thespakusatsu Gunma	Yurtec Stadium Sendai	2,685
3rd round	2018.07.11	Omiya Ardija	0-1	Vegalta Sendai	NACK5 Stadium Omiya	3,752
4th round	2018.08.22	Yokohama F. Marinos	2-3	Vegalta Sendai	NHK Spring Mitsuzawa Football Stadium	5,977
Quarterfinals	2018.10.24	Júbilo Iwata	1-1 (a.e.t.) 0-0; Penalties 3-4	Vegalta Sendai	Yamaha Stadium	4,068
Semi-finals	2018.12.05	Vegalta Sendai	3-2	Montedio Yamagata	Yurtec Stadium Sendai	16,604
Final	2018.12.09	Urawa Red Diamonds	1-0	Vegalta Sendai	Saitama Stadium 2002	50,978

== J.League Cup ==
Match	Date	Team	Score	Team	Venue	Attendance
Group A-1	2018.03.07	Vegalta Sendai	1-1	Albirex Niigata	Yurtec Stadium Sendai	6,508
Group A-2	2018.03.14	Yokohama F. Marinos	0-0	Vegalta Sendai	NHK Spring Mitsuzawa Football Stadium	6,391
Group A-3	2018.04.04	Vegalta Sendai	3-0	FC Tokyo	Yurtec Stadium Sendai	7,068
Group A-4	2018.04.18	Albirex Niigata	3-1	Vegalta Sendai	Denka Big Swan Stadium	2,681
Group A-5	2018.05.09	Vegalta Sendai	4-2	Yokohama F. Marinos	Yurtec Stadium Sendai	7,187
Group A-6	2018.05.16	FC Tokyo	0-1	Vegalta Sendai	Ajinomoto Stadium	6,016
Play-offs-1	2018.06.02	Shonan Bellmare	3-0	Vegalta Sendai	Shonan BMW Stadium Hiratsuka	8,374
Play-offs-2	2018.06.09	Vegalta Sendai	3-1	Shonan Bellmare	Yurtec Stadium Sendai	10,215

== Honours ==
=== TAG Heuer YOUNG GUNS AWARD ===
- (Japan) Ko Itakura
