= Daniel Schmidt (footballer) =

US-born Japanese footballer (born 1992)

Daniel Schmidt シュミット・ダニエル
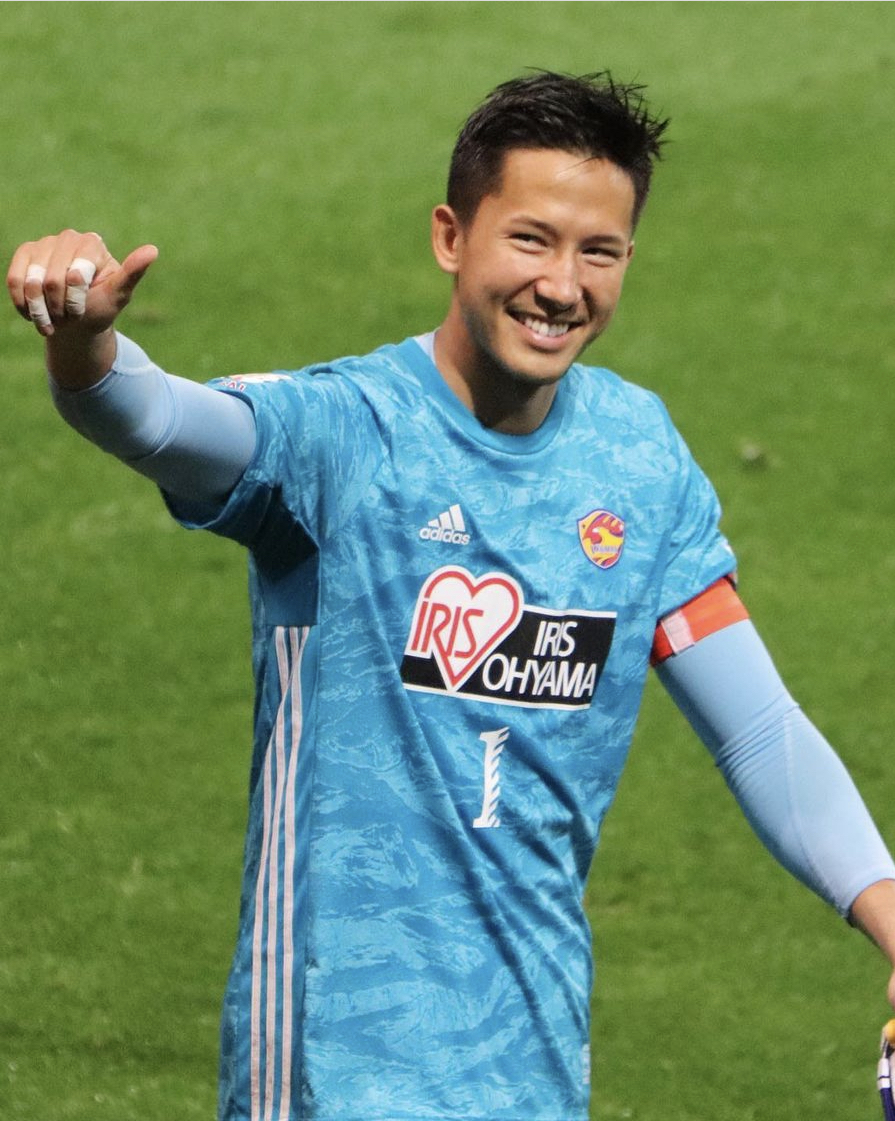
- Schmidt with Vegalta Sendai in 2019

Personal information
- Full name: Daniel Yuji Yabuki Schmidt
- Date of birth: 3 February 1992 (age 34)
- Place of birth: Illinois, United States
- Height: 1.96 m (6 ft 5 in)
- Position: Goalkeeper

Team information
- Current team: Nagoya Grampus
- Number: 1

Youth career
- 2001: Hachiman SSS
- 2002–2003: Sendai Sports Schule
- 2004–2006: Tohoku Gakuin Junior High School
- 2007–2009: Tohoku Gakuin High School

College career
Years	Team	Apps	(Gls)
2010–2013	Chuo University		

Senior career*
Years	Team	Apps	(Gls)
2010–2012	Kawasaki Frontale (DSP)	0	(0)
2014–2019	Vegalta Sendai	57	(0)
2014	→ Roasso Kumamoto (loan)	4	(0)
2015	→ Roasso Kumamoto (loan)	26	(0)
2016	→ Matsumoto Yamaga (loan)	41	(0)
2019–2023	Sint-Truiden	110	(0)
2023–2025	Gent	10	(0)
2025–	Nagoya Grampus	23	(0)

International career^{‡}
2018–2023	Japan	14	(0)
Medal record
Vegalta Sendai
Runner-up	Emperor's Cup	2018
Representing Japan
AFC Asian Cup
Silver medal – second place	2019 United Arab Emirates
- * Club domestic league appearances and goals as of 12 August 2026 ‡ National team caps and goals as of 12 September 2023

Daniel Yuji Yabuki Schmidt (矢吹シュミット・ダニエル勇二, Yabuki Shumitto Danieru Yūji; born 3 February 1992) is a professional footballer who plays as a goalkeeper for the J1 League club Nagoya Grampus.

== Early life ==
Born in the United States to a German American father and Japanese mother, Schmidt moved with his family to Sendai, Japan at the age of two. He attended Chuo University.

== Club career ==
Schmidt played three consecutive seasons as a Designated Special Player for Kawasaki Frontale while at the Chuo University, before entering the professional ranks in 2013.

He later signed for Vegalta Sendai, but Schmidt played his first pro match during a one-month loan to Roasso Kumamoto in April 2014. After playing his first ever game with Vegalta in J. League Cup, he was again loaned to Roasso, this time until the end of 2015 season. A third loan was established in 2016, this time to Matsumoto Yamaga.

On 18 July 2019, Schmidt joined Belgian side Sint-Truiden on a permanent deal.

On 4 February 2023, he made his 100th appearance in the Belgian Pro League against Kortrijk.

On 28 December 2023, Schmidt joined fellow Belgian club Gent on a permanent deal, signing a contract until June 2027.

On 6 January 2025, Schmidt returned to Japan to play for Nagoya Grampus.

== International career ==
On 30 August 2018, Schmidt received his first international callup from the Japan national team for the Kirin Challenge Cup 2018. He made his debut appearance in a friendly match against Venezuela on 16 November 2018 and played his first competitive match for Japan on 17 January 2019 in the 2–1 win against Uzbekistan during the 2019 AFC Asian Cup.

In September 2022, he stopped a penalty kick in Japan's friendly match against Ecuador, which ended in a scoreless draw. Schmidt was selected as the man of the match by the media. He was selected for the 2022 FIFA World Cup team in November 2022.

On March 24, 2023, Schmidt played for Japan in a friendly against Uruguay that ended in a 1–1 draw. He played in the second half of a friendly against Turkey on 12 September after replacing injured starter Kosuke Nakamura.

== Career statistics ==
=== Club ===
As of the start from 2025 season.

Appearances and goals by club, season and competition
Club	Season	League			National cup (Note: Includes Emperor's Cup, Belgian Cup)		League cup (Note: Includes J. League Cup)		Continental		Total	
Club	Season	Division	Apps	Goals	Apps	Goals	Apps	Goals	Apps	Goals	Apps	Goals
Vegalta Sendai	2014	J.League Div 1	0	0	—		1	0	—		1	0
Vegalta Sendai	2015	J1 League	0	0	0	0	0	0	—		0	0
Vegalta Sendai	2017	J1 League	20	0	0	0	4	0	—		24	0
Vegalta Sendai	2018	J1 League	18	0	3	0	1	0	—		22	0
Vegalta Sendai	2019	J1 League	17	0	0	0	2	0	—		19	0
Vegalta Sendai	Total		55	0	3	0	8	0	—		66	0
Roasso Kumamoto (loan)	2014	J.League Div 2	4	0	—		—		—		4	0
Roasso Kumamoto (loan)	2015	J2 League	26	0	2	0	—		—		28	0
Roasso Kumamoto (loan)	Total		30	0	2	0	—		—		32	0
Matsumoto Yamaga (loan)	2016	J2 League	41	0	1	0	—		—		42	0
Sint-Truiden	2019–20	Belgian Pro League	20	0	2	0	—		—		22	0
Sint-Truiden	2020–21	Belgian Pro League	24	0	0	0	—		—		24	0
Sint-Truiden	2021–22	Belgian Pro League	31	0	0	0	—		—		31	0
Sint-Truiden	2022–23	Belgian Pro League	31	0	2	0	—		—		33	0
Sint-Truiden	2023–24	Belgian Pro League	4	0	0	0	—		—		4	0
Sint-Truiden	Total		110	0	4	0	—		—		114	0
Gent	2023–24	Belgian Pro League	9	0	1	0	0	0	—		10	0
Gent	2024–25	Belgian Pro League	1	0	1	0	—		2 (Note: Appearances in UEFA Conference League)	0	4	0
Gent	Total		10	0	2	0	—		2	0	14	0
Nagoya Grampus	2025	J1 League	0	0	0	0	0	0	0	0	0	0
Career total			246	0	12	0	8	0	2	0	268	0

=== International ===
As of match played 12 September 2023

Appearances and goals by national team and year
National team	Year	Apps	Goals
Japan	2018	1	0
Japan	2019	4	0
Japan	2020	2	0
Japan	2022	4	0
Japan	2023	3	0
Total		14	0

== Honours ==
Vegalta Sendai

- Emperor's Cup runner-up: 2018

Japan

- AFC Asian Cup runner-up: 2019

Individual

- Japan Pro-Footballers Association Best XI: 2022
