= Takuma Nishimura (footballer) =

Japanese footballer

Takuma Nishimura 西村 拓真
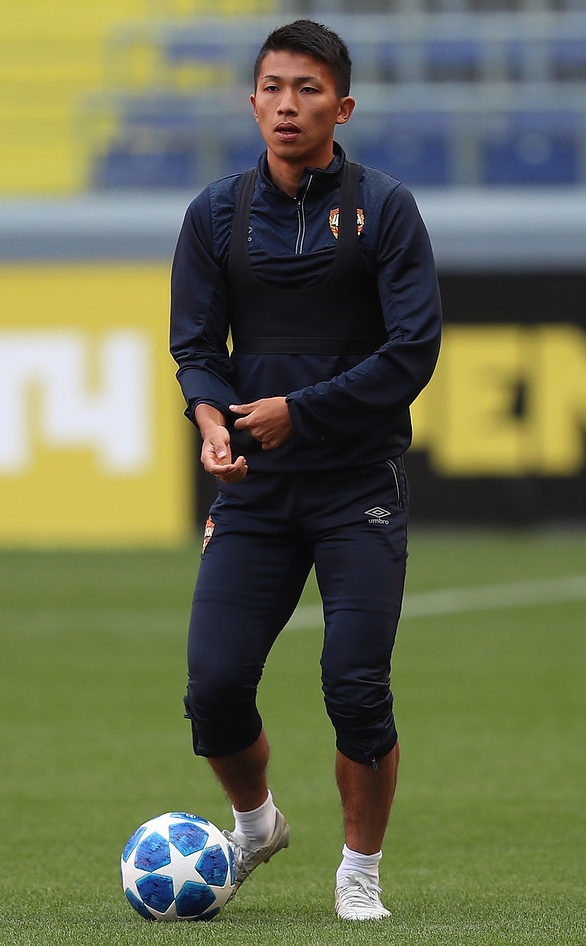

Personal information
- Date of birth: 22 October 1996 (age 30)
- Place of birth: Nagoya, Aichi, Japan
- Height: 1.78 m (5 ft 10 in)
- Positions: Forward; winger

Team information
- Current team: Machida Zelvia
- Number: 20

Youth career
- –2011: Meito Club
- 2012–2014: Toyama Daiichi High School

Senior career*
Years	Team	Apps	(Gls)
2015–2018	Vegalta Sendai	64	(14)
2015	→ J. League U-22 (loan)	14	(1)
2018–2021	CSKA Moscow	17	(2)
2020	→ Portimonense (loan)	2	(0)
2020–2021	→ Vegalta Sendai (loan)	20	(3)
2021	Vegalta Sendai	52	(9)
2022–2024	Yokohama F. Marinos	71	(16)
2024	→ Servette (loan)	14	(3)
2025–	Machida Zelvia	34	(7)

International career^{‡}
2022–	Japan	5	(3)
Medal record
Vegalta Sendai
Runner-up	Emperor's Cup	2018
Yokohama F. Marinos
Winner	J1 League	2022
FC Machida Zelvia
Winner	Emperor's Cup	2025
Men's football
Representing Japan
EAFF Championship
Winner	2022 Japan	Team
- * Club domestic league appearances and goals as of 9 August 2026 ‡ National team caps and goals as of 28 March 2023

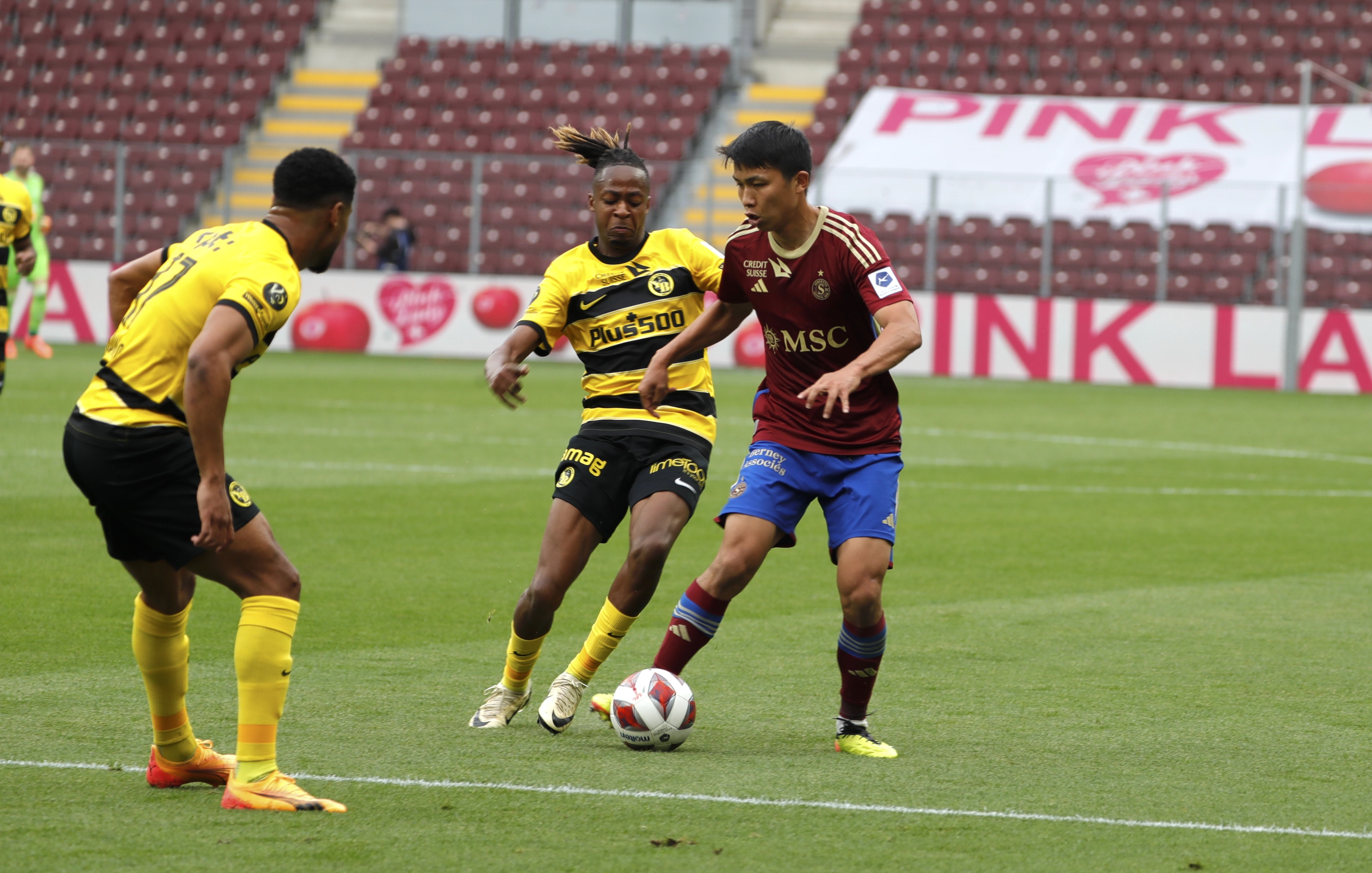
Takuma Nishimura with Servette FC (Geneva) May 2024

Takuma Nishimura (西村 拓真, Nishimura Takuma; born October 22, 1996) is a Japanese football player. He plays as a Forward and is set to play for J1 League club, Machida Zelvia from 2025 and the Japan national team.

== Club career ==
=== CSKA Moscow ===
On 31 August 2018, he signed a 4-year contract with the Russian Premier League club CSKA Moscow. He scored his first Russian Premier League goal for CSKA on 9 March 2019 in a 3–0 victory over FC Rubin Kazan.

=== Portimonense S.C. ===
On 10 January 2020 CSKA announced that he would join Portuguese club Portimonense on loan for the rest of the 2019–20 season, with a purchase option. On 26 March, Nishimura's loan deal at Portimonense was ended, prematurely, to allow Nishimura to return to Vegalta Sendai on loan until June 2020.

=== Return to Vegalta Sendai ===
On 11 February 2021, Vegalta Sendai announced that he would return to the club on a permanent transfer.

=== Yokohama F. Marinos ===
In 2022, he moved to Yokohama F. Marinos and scored a goal to win the team in the league title.

On 11 February 2023, he scored the winning goal at the 2023 Japanese Super Cup, giving Marinos their first Japanese Super Cup title.

=== Servette FC ===
On 10 February 2024, he joined Servette on loan with an option to buy This option to buy was not activated by the club and he left the club when his loan deal expired on the 30th June 2024, as a Swiss Cup champion.

=== Return to Yokohama F. Marinos ===
On 14 June 2024, Nishimura was announced that will be returning to Yokohama F. Marinos for mid 2024 season.

=== Machida Zelvia ===
On 25 December 2024, Nishimura was announce official permanent transfer to Machida Zelvia from 2025 season.

== Career statistics ==
=== Club ===
As of 11 March 2025.

Appearances and goals by club, season and competition
Club	Season	League			National cup (Note: Includes Emperor's Cup, Russian Cup, and Taça de Portugal)		League cup (Note: Includes J.League Cup and Taça da Liga)		Continental (Note: Includes UEFA Champions League and AFC Champions League)		Other		Total	
Club	Season	Division	Apps	Goals	Apps	Goals	Apps	Goals	Apps	Goals	Apps	Goals	Apps	Goals
Vegalta Sendai	2015	J1 League	0	0	0	0	1	0	ー		ー		1	0
Vegalta Sendai	2016	J1 League	12	1	0	0	2	0	ー		ー		14	1
Vegalta Sendai	2017	J1 League	28	2	0	0	10	2	ー		ー		38	4
Vegalta Sendai	2018	J1 League	24	11	1	0	5	2	ー		ー		30	13
Vegalta Sendai	Total		64	14	1	0	18	4	ー		ー		83	18
CSKA Moscow	2018–19	RPL	12	2	1	0	ー		2	0	0	0	15	2
CSKA Moscow	2019–20	RPL	5	0	2	2	ー		1	0	ー		8	2
CSKA Moscow	Total		17	2	3	2	ー	ー	3	0	0	0	23	4
Portimonense (loan)	2019–20	Primeira Liga	2	0	0	0	0	0	ー				2	0
Portimonense (loan)	Total		2	0	0	0	0	0	ー				2	0
Vegalta Sendai (loan)	2020	J1 League	20	3	ー		1	0	ー		ー		21	3
Vegalta Sendai	2021	J1 League	32	6	1	0	2	0	ー				35	6
Vegalta Sendai	Total		52	9	1	0	3	0	ー				56	9
Yokohama F. Marinos	2022	J1 League	27	10	2	1	1	0	7	2	ー		30	11
Yokohama F. Marinos	2023	J1 League	32	3	0	0	6	2	0	0	1 (Note: Appearance at the Japanese Super Cup)	1	39	6
Yokohama F. Marinos	2024	J1 League	12	3	3	1	3	1	0	0	0	0	18	5
Yokohama F. Marinos	Total		71	16	5	2	10	3	7	2	1	1	94	24
Servette FC	2023–24	Swiss Super League	14	3	3	1	ー						17	4
Servette FC	Total		14	3	3	1	ー						17	4
Machida Zelvia	2025	J1 League	5	2	0	0	0	0	0	0	ー		5	2
Machida Zelvia	Total		5	2	0	0	0	0	0	0	0	0	5	2
Career total			225	46	14	6	34	9	10	2	1	1	284	64

=== International goals ===
Scores and results list Japan's goal tally first.

No	Date	Venue	Opponent	Score	Result	Competition
1.	19 July 2022	Kashima Soccer Stadium, Ibaraki, Japan	Hong Kong	3–0	6–0	2022 EAFF E-1 Football Championship
2.	19 July 2022	Kashima Soccer Stadium, Ibaraki, Japan	Hong Kong	4–0	6–0	2022 EAFF E-1 Football Championship
3.	24 March 2023	Japan National Stadium, Tokyo, Japan	Uruguay	1–1	1–1	Friendly

== Honours ==
Yokohama F. Marinos

- J1 League: 2022
- Japanese Super Cup: 2023

Servette FC

- Swiss Cup: 2023–24

Japan

- EAFF Championship: 2022

FC Machida Zelvia

- Emperor's Cup: 2025
