= Ryohei Michibuchi =

Japanese footballer

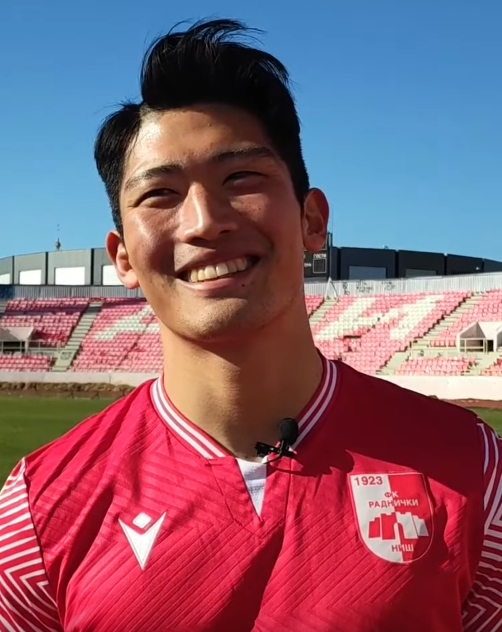
- Michibuchi in 2022

Personal information
- Full name: Ryohei Michibuchi
- Date of birth: 16 June 1994 (age 32)
- Place of birth: Miyagi, Japan
- Height: 1.77 m (5 ft 10 in)
- Position: Winger

Youth career
- 2010–2012: Vegalta Sendai
- 2013–2017: Meiji University

Senior career*
Years	Team	Apps	(Gls)
2017–2018	Ventforet Kofu	31	(2)
2019–2020	Vegalta Sendai	38	(6)
2021	Chungnam Asan FC	7	(2)
2021–2022	Radnički Niš	39	(3)
2023–2024	Balzan	22	(1)
2024–2025	Semen Padang	17	(1)
2025	Smederevo	14	(1)
- * Club domestic league appearances and goals as of 25 May 2025

Ryohei Michibuchi (Japanese: 道渕 諒平, romanized: Michibuchi Ryohei; born 16 June 1994) is a Japanese professional footballer who plays as a winger.

== Career ==
=== Asia ===
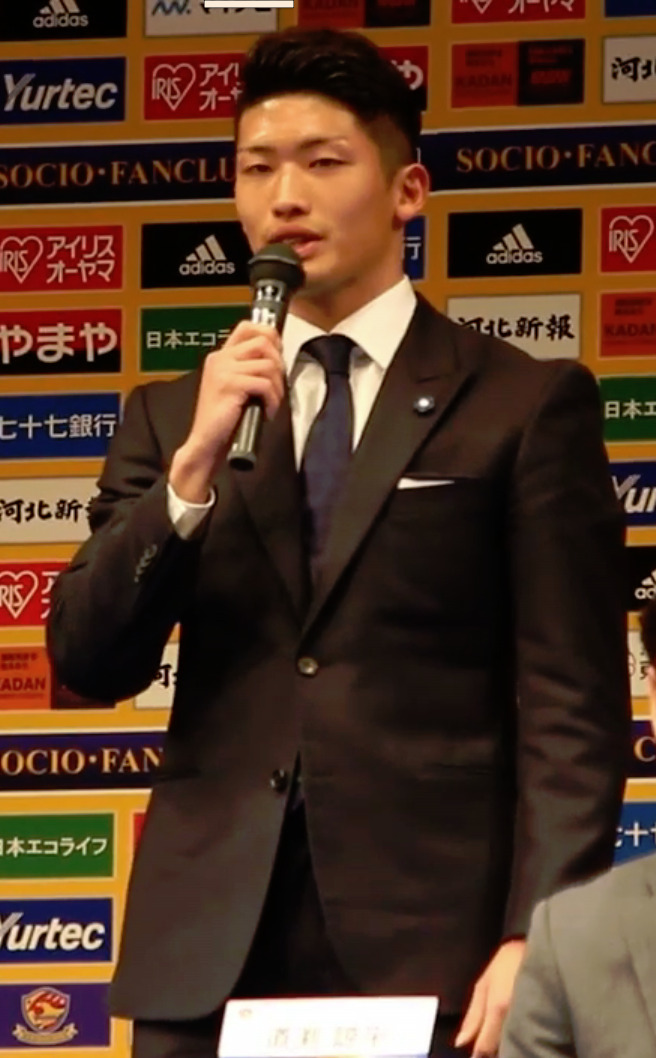
Michibuchi in 2019

After attending Meiji University, Michibuchi joined Ventforet Kofu, making his senior debut in 2017. He spent two seasons at the club before switching to Vegalta Sendai.

In February 2021, Michibuchi went abroad to South Korea and joined K League 2 club Chungnam Asan FC. He was released from his contract three months later because it enamged that Michibuchi charged with domestic violence against his wife in 2021

=== Europe ===
In June 2021, Michibuchi arrived in Serbia and signed with Radnički Niš, becoming the second Japanese player in club history (after Ryota Noma).

In May 2023, Michibuchi signed for Maltese Premier League club Balzan.

== Personal life ==
In 2020, Michibuchi moved to Serbia.

== Career statistics ==
As of 27 December 2024

Appearances and goals by club, season and competition
Club	Season	League			National Cup		League Cup		Continental		Total	
Club	Season	Division	Apps	Goals	Apps	Goals	Apps	Goals	Apps	Goals	Apps	Goals
Ventforet Kofu	2017	J1 League	4	0	1	0	6	0	—		11	0
Ventforet Kofu	2018	J2 League	27	2	4	0	9	0	—		40	2
Ventforet Kofu	Total		31	2	5	0	15	0	—		51	2
Vegalta Sendai	2019	J1 League	25	5	1	0	8	1	—		34	6
Vegalta Sendai	2020	J1 League	13	1	0	0	1	0	—		14	1
Vegalta Sendai	Total		38	6	1	0	9	1	—		48	7
Chungnam Asan	2021	K League 2	7	2	0	0	—		—		7	2
Radnički Niš	2021–22	Serbian SuperLiga	35	3	1	0	—		—		36	3
Radnički Niš	2022–23	Serbian SuperLiga	4	0	0	0	—		—		4	0
Radnički Niš	Total		39	3	1	0	0	0	—		40	3
Balzan	2023–24	Maltese Premier League	22	1	0	0	—		—		22	1
Semen Padang	2024–25	Liga 1	17	1	0	0	—		—		17	1
Career total			154	15	7	0	24	1	—		185	16
