= 2021 Vegalta Sendai season =

Vegalta Sendai
2021 season
- Chairman: Sasaki Tomohiro
- Manager: Makoto Teguramori; Masato Harasaki
- Stadium: Yurtec Stadium Sendai
- J1 League: 19th (↓J2)
- J.League Cup: group stage
- Emperor's Cup: 2nd round
- Top goalscorer: League: Nishimura; All: Nishimura
Home colours	Away colours

2021 Vegalta Sendai season.

== Squad ==
As of 14 January 2022.

Note: Flags indicate national team as defined under FIFA eligibility rules; some limited exceptions apply. Players may hold more than one non-FIFA nationality.

No.	Pos.	Nation	Player
1	GK	JPN	Yuma Obata
2	MF	JPN	Yosuke Akiyama
3	DF	JPN	Naoya Fukumori
4	DF	JPN	Koji Hachisuka
5	DF	JPN	Hisashi Appiah Tawiah
6	MF	JPN	Rikiya Uehara
7	MF	JPN	Kunimitsu Sekiguchi
8	MF	JPN	Yoshiki Matsushita
9	MF	ESP	Isaac Cuenca
11	FW	JPN	Shuhei Akasaki
13	DF	JPN	Yasuhiro Hiraoka
14	MF	JPN	Takayoshi Ishihara
15	FW	JPN	Takuma Nishimura
16	MF	JPN	Kyohei Yoshino
17	MF	JPN	Shingo Tomita
18	MF	JPN	Shogo Nakahara
19	FW	JPN	Yusuke Minagawa

No.	Pos.	Nation	Player
20	FW	JPN	Shun Nagasawa
21	GK	JPN	Kaito Ioka
22	GK	SRB	Nedeljko Stojišić
23	DF	MOZ	Simão Mate
24	DF	JPN	Hayate Nagakura
25	DF	JPN	Takumi Mase
26	DF	JPN	Chihiro Kato
27	GK	POL	Jakub Słowik
28	MF	JPN	Takumi Sasaki
29	FW	GHA	Emmanuel Oti
30	MF	JPN	Wataru Tanaka
31	DF	JPN	Hayato Teruyama
32	MF	JPN	Ryoma Kida
33	FW	BRA	Felippe Cardoso
35	MF	BRA	Foguinho
42	FW	JPN	Cayman Togashi

== J1 League ==
=== League table ===
Pos	Team	Pld	W	D	L	GF	GA	GD	Pts	Qualification or relegation
16	Shonan Bellmare	38	7	16	15	36	41	−5	37 (Note: The JPFL awarded a 3–0 win to Shonan Bellmare after Urawa Red Diamonds fielded Zion Suzuki who was an ineligible player. The original score was 3–2 for Shonan Bellmare.)	
17	Tokushima Vortis (R)	38	10	6	22	34	55	−21	36	Relegation to the J2 League
18	Oita Trinita (R)	38	9	8	21	31	55	−24	35	Relegation to the J2 League
19	Vegalta Sendai (R)	38	5	13	20	31	62	−31	28	Relegation to the J2 League
20	Yokohama FC (R)	38	6	9	23	32	77	−45	27	Relegation to the J2 League

Source: Meiji Yasuda J1 League, J.League Data Site
Rules for classification: 1) Points; 2) Goal difference; 3) Goals scored; 4) Head-to-head points; 5) Head-to-head goal difference; 6) Head-to-head goal scored; 7) Fair-play points.
(R) Relegation to the J2 League

=== Match details ===
J1 League match details
Match	Date	Team	Score	Team	Venue	Attendance
1	2021.02.27	Sanfrecce Hiroshima	1–1	Vegalta Sendai	Edion Stadium Hiroshima	8,820
2	2021.03.06	Vegalta Sendai	1–5	Kawasaki Frontale	Yurtec Stadium Sendai	9,005
3	2021.03.10	Sagan Tosu	0–5	Vegalta Sendai	Ekimae Real Estate Stadium	4,604
4	2021.03.13	Shonan Bellmare	3–1	Vegalta Sendai	Shonan BMW Stadium Hiratsuka	3,642
6	2021.03.21	FC Tokyo	2–1	Vegalta Sendai	Ajinomoto Stadium	4,402
7	2021.04.03	Vegalta Sendai	0–2	Vissel Kobe	Yurtec Stadium Sendai	4,619
8	2021.04.07	Tokushima Vortis	1–0	Vegalta Sendai	Pocarisweat Stadium	3,515
9	2021.04.11	Vegalta Sendai	0–0	Yokohama F. Marinos	Yurtec Stadium Sendai	4,355
10	2021.04.17	Yokohama FC	2–2	Vegalta Sendai	NHK Spring Mitsuzawa Football Stadium	2,997
11	2021.04.24	Hokkaido Consadole Sapporo	2–1	Vegalta Sendai	Sapporo Atsubetsu Stadium	4,336
12	2021.05.01	Vegalta Sendai	1–0	Kashiwa Reysol	Yurtec Stadium Sendai	4,292
13	2021.05.09	Urawa Reds	2–0	Vegalta Sendai	Saitama Stadium 2002	4,750
20	2021.05.12	Kawasaki Frontale	2–2	Vegalta Sendai	Kawasaki Todoroki Stadium	4,752
14	2021.05.15	Vegalta Sendai	0–1	Avispa Fukuoka	Yurtec Stadium Sendai	6,249
15	2021.05.22	Vegalta Sendai	2–1	Oita Trinita	Yurtec Stadium Sendai	5,045
16	2021.05.26	Nagoya Grampus	0–1	Vegalta Sendai	Yurtec Stadium Sendai	4,999
17	2021.05.30	Vegalta Sendai	1–1	Cerezo Osaka	Yurtec Stadium Sendai	8,346
18	2021.06.20	Kashima Antlers	1–1	Vegalta Sendai	Kashima Soccer Stadium	9,312
19	2021.06.23	Vegalta Sendai	2–3	Shimizu S-Pulse	Yurtec Stadium Sendai	5,045
21	2021.07.03	Vegalta Sendai	0–0	Urawa Reds	Yurtec Stadium Sendai	8,243
22	2021.07.10	Vegalta Sendai	1–1	Hokkaido Consadole Sapporo	Yurtec Stadium Sendai	7,885
5	2021.08.03	Vegalta Sendai	0–1	Gamba Osaka	Yurtec Stadium Sendai	4,940
23	2021.08.09	Cerezo Osaka	0–0	Vegalta Sendai	Saitama Stadium 2002	4,200
24	2021.08.14	Vegalta Sendai	0–0	Yokohama FC	Yurtec Stadium Sendai	5,827
25	2021.08.21	Yokohama F. Marinos	5–0	Vegalta Sendai	NHK Spring Mitsuzawa Football Stadium	4,857
26	2021.08.25	Vegalta Sendai	1–2	FC Tokyo	Yurtec Stadium Sendai	3,096
27	2021.08.29	Vegalta Sendai	0–1	Sagan Tosu	Yurtec Stadium Sendai	3,807
28	2021.09.12	Gamba Osaka	2–3	Vegalta Sendai	Panasonic Stadium Suita	4,777
29	2021.09.18	Shimizu S-Pulse	2–1	Vegalta Sendai	Ekimae Real Estate Stadium	5,453
30	2021.09.25	Vegalta Sendai	0–1	Tokushima Vortis	Yurtec Stadium Sendai	4,613
31	2021.10.02	Kashiwa Reysol	1–1	Vegalta Sendai	Yurtec Stadium Sendai	5,430
32	2021.10.17	Oita Trinita	0–2	Vegalta Sendai	Yurtec Stadium Sendai	8,897
33	2021.10.23	Vegalta Sendai	2–0	Sanfrecce Hiroshima	Yurtec Stadium Sendai	6,236
34	2021.11.03	Vissel Kobe	4–2	Vegalta Sendai	Yurtec Stadium Sendai	11,427
35	2021.11.07	Vegalta Sendai	1–1	Nagoya Grampus	Yurtec Stadium Sendai	8,341
36	2021.11.20	Vegalta Sendai	0–2	Shonan Bellmare	Yurtec Stadium Sendai	8,362
37	2021.11.27	Avispa Fukuoka	2–2	Vegalta Sendai	Best Denki Stadium	7,663
38	2021.12.04	Vegalta Sendai	0–1	Kashima Antlers	Yurtec Stadium Sendai	8,569

*In order to prevent coronavirus, the number of visitors will be increased in stages.

=== Meritorious Player Award ===
- (Japan) Hisato Satō
