= 2019 Vegalta Sendai season =

Vegalta Sendai
2019 season
- Chairman: Kikuchi Sixyuitu
- Manager: Susumu Watanabe
- Stadium: Yurtec Stadium Sendai
- J1 League: 11th
- J.League Cup: play-offs
- Emperor's Cup: 4th round
- Top goalscorer: League: Nagasawa; All: Nagasawa
Home colours	Away colours

2019 Vegalta Sendai season.

== Squad ==
As of 14 January 2020.

Note: Flags indicate national team as defined under FIFA eligibility rules; some limited exceptions apply. Players may hold more than one non-FIFA nationality.

No.	Pos.	Nation	Player
1	GK	JPN	Daniel Schmidt
2	DF	JPN	Katsuya Nagato
3	MF	JPN	Ryutaro Iio
4	DF	JPN	Koji Hachisuka
5	MF	JPN	Keiya Shiihashi
6	MF	JPN	Shingo Hyodo
7	MF	JPN	Kunimitsu Sekiguchi
8	MF	JPN	Yoshiki Matsushita
9	FW	BRA	Ramon Lopes
10	MF	PRK	Ryang Yong-gi
11	FW	JPN	Naoki Ishihara
13	DF	JPN	Yasuhiro Hiraoka
14	MF	JPN	Takayoshi Ishihara
15	MF	JPN	Kaina Yoshio (on loan from Yokohama F. Marinos)
17	MF	JPN	Shingo Tomita

No.	Pos.	Nation	Player
18	MF	JPN	Ryohei Michibuchi
19	FW	JPN	Ryo Germain
20	FW	JPN	Takuma Abe
21	GK	JPN	Kentaro Seki
22	GK	JPN	Goro Kawanami
23	DF	MOZ	Simão Mate
24	GK	POL	Jakub Słowik
27	DF	JPN	Kazuki Oiwa
29	FW	BRA	Diogo Acosta
30	MF	JPN	Wataru Tanaka
31	DF	JPN	Hayato Teruyama
33	DF	JPN	Masato Tokida
37	MF	JPN	Shogo Nakahara
38	FW	JPN	Shun Nagasawa
39	DF	KOR	Kim Jung-ya

== J1 League ==
=== League table ===
Pos	Team	Pld	W	D	L	GF	GA	GD	Pts
9	Oita Trinita	34	12	11	11	35	35	0	47
10	Hokkaido Consadole Sapporo	34	13	7	14	54	49	+5	46
11	Vegalta Sendai	34	12	5	17	38	45	−7	41
12	Shimizu S-Pulse	34	11	6	17	45	69	−24	39
13	Nagoya Grampus	34	9	10	15	45	50	−5	37

Source: Meiji Yasuda J1 League
Rules for classification: 1) Points; 2) Goal difference; 3) Goals scored.

=== Match details ===
J1 League match details
Match	Date	Team	Score	Team	Venue	Attendance
1	2019.02.23	Vegalta Sendai	0–0	Urawa Reds	Yurtec Stadium Sendai	18,567
2	2019.03.02	Yokohama F. Marinos	2–1	Vegalta Sendai	Nissan Stadium (Yokohama)	22,751
3	2019.03.10	Vegalta Sendai	1–3	Vissel Kobe	Yurtec Stadium Sendai	19,503
4	2019.03.17	Shonan Bellmare	1–2	Vegalta Sendai	Shonan BMW Stadium Hiratsuka	9,290
5	2019.03.30	Vegalta Sendai	0–2	Cerezo Osaka	Yurtec Stadium Sendai	10,931
6	2019.04.06	Vegalta Sendai	3–0	Sagan Tosu	Yurtec Stadium Sendai	11,235
7	2019.04.14	Oita Trinita	2–0	Vegalta Sendai	Showa Denko Dome Oita	11,477
8	2019.04.20	Kashima Antlers	1–0	Vegalta Sendai	Kashima Soccer Stadium	16,844
9	2019.04.28	Vegalta Sendai	2–1	Gamba Osaka	Yurtec Stadium Sendai	16,004
10	2019.05.03	Kawasaki Frontale	3–1	Vegalta Sendai	Kawasaki Todoroki Stadium	25,789
11	2019.05.12	Vegalta Sendai	2–1	Sanfrecce Hiroshima	Yurtec Stadium Sendai	12,180
12	2019.05.18	Júbilo Iwata	2–0	Vegalta Sendai	Yamaha Stadium	12,864
13	2019.05.25	Shimizu S-Pulse	4–3	Vegalta Sendai	IAI Stadium Nihondaira	12,234
14	2019.06.01	Vegalta Sendai	3–1	Nagoya Grampus	Yurtec Stadium Sendai	12,853
15	2019.06.15	Matsumoto Yamaga FC	0–1	Vegalta Sendai	Sunpro Alwin	14,078
16	2019.06.23	Vegalta Sendai	2–0	FC Tokyo	Yurtec Stadium Sendai	12,343
17	2019.06.30	Vegalta Sendai	2–1	Hokkaido Consadole Sapporo	Yurtec Stadium Sendai	12,125
18	2019.07.06	Urawa Reds	1–0	Vegalta Sendai	Saitama Stadium 2002	28,904
19	2019.07.13	Vegalta Sendai	0–4	Kashima Antlers	Yurtec Stadium Sendai	17,639
20	2019.07.20	Cerezo Osaka	0–0	Vegalta Sendai	Yanmar Stadium Nagai	15,574
21	2019.08.03	Vegalta Sendai	2–1	Júbilo Iwata	Yurtec Stadium Sendai	15,084
22	2019.08.10	FC Tokyo	1–0	Vegalta Sendai	Ajinomoto Stadium	28,435
23	2019.08.17	Vegalta Sendai	2–2	Kawasaki Frontale	Yurtec Stadium Sendai	17,860
24	2019.08.24	Vegalta Sendai	1–1	Shonan Bellmare	Yurtec Stadium Sendai	17,759
25	2019.08.31	Sagan Tosu	2–1	Vegalta Sendai	Ekimae Real Estate Stadium	15,194
26	2019.09.14	Hokkaido Consadole Sapporo	1–3	Vegalta Sendai	Sapporo Atsubetsu Stadium	11,254
27	2019.09.28	Vegalta Sendai	1–1	Yokohama F. Marinos	Yurtec Stadium Sendai	15,688
28	2019.10.05	Vegalta Sendai	0–1	Matsumoto Yamaga FC	Yurtec Stadium Sendai	15,285
29	2019.10.19	Nagoya Grampus	0–2	Vegalta Sendai	Paloma Mizuho Stadium	15,485
30	2019.11.02	Vissel Kobe	2–0	Vegalta Sendai	Noevir Stadium Kobe	18,975
31	2019.11.10	Vegalta Sendai	2–0	Shimizu S-Pulse	Yurtec Stadium Sendai	15,553
32	2019.11.23	Gamba Osaka	0–2	Vegalta Sendai	Panasonic Stadium Suita	26,256
33	2019.11.30	Vegalta Sendai	2–0	Oita Trinita	Yurtec Stadium Sendai	13,894
34	2019.12.07	Sanfrecce Hiroshima	1–0	Vegalta Sendai	Edion Stadium Hiroshima	13,228

=== J.League Monthly MVP ===
Month	J2	
Month	Player	Source
June	(Mozambique) Simão Mate	

=== Monthly Best Manager ===
Month	J2	
Month	Manager	Source
June	(Japan) Susumu Watanabe	

=== Valuable Player Award ===
- (Mozambique) Simão Mate
