= 2017 Ventforet Kofu season =

Ventforet Kofu
2017 season
- Manager: Tatsuma Yoshida
- Stadium: Yamanashi Chuo Bank Stadium
- J1 League: 16th

2017 Ventforet Kofu season.

== J1 League ==
=== League table ===
Pos	Team	Pld	W	D	L	GF	GA	GD	Pts	Qualification or relegation
14	Shimizu S-Pulse	34	8	10	16	36	54	−18	34	
15	Sanfrecce Hiroshima	34	8	9	17	32	49	−17	33	
16	Ventforet Kofu (R)	34	7	11	16	23	39	−16	32	Relegation to 2018 J2 League
17	Albirex Niigata (R)	34	7	7	20	28	60	−32	28	Relegation to 2018 J2 League
18	Omiya Ardija (R)	34	5	10	19	28	60	−32	25	Relegation to 2018 J2 League

Source: Meiji Yasuda J1 League
Rules for classification: 1) Points; 2) Goal difference; 3) Goals scored
(R) Relegated

=== Match details ===
J1 League match details
Match	Date	Team	Score	Team	Venue	Attendance
1	2017.02.26	Gamba Osaka	1-1	Ventforet Kofu	Suita City Football Stadium	21,284
2	2017.03.04	Ventforet Kofu	0-1	Kashima Antlers	Yamanashi Chuo Bank Stadium	13,199
3	2017.03.10	Urawa Reds	4-1	Ventforet Kofu	Saitama Stadium 2002	22,711
4	2017.03.18	Ventforet Kofu	1-0	Omiya Ardija	Yamanashi Chuo Bank Stadium	10,079
5	2017.04.02	Ventforet Kofu	2-0	Hokkaido Consadole Sapporo	Yamanashi Chuo Bank Stadium	10,195
6	2017.04.08	Kawasaki Frontale	1-1	Ventforet Kofu	Kawasaki Todoroki Stadium	19,867
7	2017.04.16	Ventforet Kofu	0-2	Albirex Niigata	Yamanashi Chuo Bank Stadium	10,472
8	2017.04.22	Ventforet Kofu	1-1	Cerezo Osaka	Yamanashi Chuo Bank Stadium	11,038
9	2017.04.30	Vissel Kobe	0-1	Ventforet Kofu	Noevir Stadium Kobe	14,662
10	2017.05.07	Ventforet Kofu	0-0	Júbilo Iwata	Yamanashi Chuo Bank Stadium	12,622
11	2017.05.14	Yokohama F. Marinos	1-0	Ventforet Kofu	NHK Spring Mitsuzawa Football Stadium	11,036
12	2017.05.20	Ventforet Kofu	1-2	Sanfrecce Hiroshima	Yamanashi Chuo Bank Stadium	8,653
13	2017.05.28	FC Tokyo	1-1	Ventforet Kofu	Ajinomoto Stadium	18,953
14	2017.06.04	Vegalta Sendai	3-0	Ventforet Kofu	Yurtec Stadium Sendai	13,107
15	2017.06.17	Ventforet Kofu	0-0	Kashiwa Reysol	Yamanashi Chuo Bank Stadium	10,566
16	2017.06.25	Shimizu S-Pulse	1-0	Ventforet Kofu	IAI Stadium Nihondaira	11,007
17	2017.07.02	Ventforet Kofu	0-0	Sagan Tosu	Yamanashi Chuo Bank Stadium	8,169
18	2017.07.08	Júbilo Iwata	1-0	Ventforet Kofu	Yamaha Stadium	14,159
19	2017.07.29	Kashima Antlers	3-0	Ventforet Kofu	Kashima Soccer Stadium	18,413
20	2017.08.05	Ventforet Kofu	1-0	Gamba Osaka	Yamanashi Chuo Bank Stadium	11,275
21	2017.08.09	Ventforet Kofu	0-1	Urawa Reds	Yamanashi Chuo Bank Stadium	14,489
22	2017.08.13	Hokkaido Consadole Sapporo	1-1	Ventforet Kofu	Sapporo Dome	19,561
23	2017.08.19	Sanfrecce Hiroshima	1-0	Ventforet Kofu	Edion Stadium Hiroshima	11,771
24	2017.08.27	Ventforet Kofu	2-2	Kawasaki Frontale	Yamanashi Chuo Bank Stadium	10,807
25	2017.09.09	Ventforet Kofu	0-1	Shimizu S-Pulse	Yamanashi Chuo Bank Stadium	12,683
26	2017.09.16	Sagan Tosu	2-1	Ventforet Kofu	Best Amenity Stadium	7,381
27	2017.09.23	Ventforet Kofu	3-2	Yokohama F. Marinos	Yamanashi Chuo Bank Stadium	12,049
28	2017.09.30	Kashiwa Reysol	0-1	Ventforet Kofu	Hitachi Kashiwa Stadium	11,123
29	2017.10.15	Ventforet Kofu	1-1	FC Tokyo	Yamanashi Chuo Bank Stadium	8,643
30	2017.10.21	Cerezo Osaka	2-0	Ventforet Kofu	Kincho Stadium	9,438
31	2017.10.29	Ventforet Kofu	2-3	Vissel Kobe	Yamanashi Chuo Bank Stadium	4,692
32	2017.11.18	Albirex Niigata	1-0	Ventforet Kofu	Denka Big Swan Stadium	16,461
33	2017.11.26	Omiya Ardija	0-0	Ventforet Kofu	NACK5 Stadium Omiya	12,435
34	2017.12.02	Ventforet Kofu	1-0	Vegalta Sendai	Yamanashi Chuo Bank Stadium	14,680
