= 2017 Vegalta Sendai season =

Vegalta Sendai
2017 season
- Chairman: Nishikawa Yoshihisa
- Manager: Susumu Watanabe
- Stadium: Yurtec Stadium Sendai
- J1 League: 12th
- J.League Cup: semi-finals
- Emperor's Cup: 2nd round
- Top goalscorer: League: Ishihara; All: Ishihara
Home colours	Away colours

2017 Vegalta Sendai season.

== J1 League ==
=== League table ===
Pos	Team	Pld	W	D	L	GF	GA	GD	Pts
10	Gamba Osaka	34	11	10	13	48	41	+7	43
11	Consadole Sapporo	34	12	7	15	39	47	−8	43
12	Vegalta Sendai	34	11	8	15	44	53	−9	41
13	FC Tokyo	34	10	10	14	37	42	−5	40
14	Shimizu S-Pulse	34	8	10	16	36	54	−18	34

Source: Meiji Yasuda J1 League
Rules for classification: 1) Points; 2) Goal difference; 3) Goals scored

=== Match details ===
J1 League match details
Match	Date	Team	Venue	Score	Attendance
1	25 February 2017	Hokkaido Consadole Sapporo	Home	1–0	17,230
2	4 March 2017	Júbilo Iwata	Away	1–0	14,554
3	11 March 2017	Vissel Kobe	Home	0–2	14,369
4	18 March 2017	Kashiwa Reysol	Away	1–0	9,905
5	1 April 2017	Kawasaki Frontale	Home	0–2	13,122
6	7 April 2017	Urawa Reds	Away	0–7	25,372
7	16 April 2017	Kashima Antlers	Home	1–4	13,159
8	22 April 2017	Sanfrecce Hiroshima	Away	3–3	10,814
9	30 April 2017	Shimizu S-Pulse	Away	3–0	15,228
10	7 May 2017	FC Tokyo	Home	0–2	17,281
11	14 May 2017	Omiya Ardija	Away	1–2	9,920
12	20 May 2017	Yokohama F. Marinos	Away	1–1	16,758
13	28 May 2017	Albirex Niigata	Home	2–1	14,259
14	4 June 2017	Ventforet Kofu	Home	3–0	13,107
15	17 June 2017	Sagan Tosu	Away	1–1	10,265
16	25 June 2017	Cerezo Osaka	Home	2–4	15,530
17	1 July 2017	Gamba Osaka	Home	2–3	14,052
18	8 July 2017	Vissel Kobe	Away	0–3	19,207
19	30 July 2017	Kashiwa Reysol	Home	1–1	14,202
20	5 August 2017	Kashima Antlers	Away	0–2	17,156
21	9 August 2017	Júbilo Iwata	Home	0–0	11,500
22	13 August 2017	Sanfrecce Hiroshima	Home	1–0	14,258
23	19 August 2017	Albirex Niigata	Away	2–1	21,011
24	26 August 2017	Hokkaido Consadole Sapporo	Away	0–1	9,535
25	10 September 2017	Sagan Tosu	Home	4–1	12,652
26	16 September 2017	FC Tokyo	Away	0–1	17,940
27	23 September 2017	Cerezo Osaka	Away	4–1	15,262
28	1 October 2017	Urawa Reds	Home	2–3	18,026
29	14 October 2017	Kawasaki Frontale	Away	2–3	18,892
30	21 October 2017	Shimizu S-Pulse	Home	0–0	14,338
31	29 October 2017	Gamba Osaka	Away	1–1	15,962
32	18 November 2017	Omiya Ardija	Home	3–0	15,533
33	26 November 2017	Yokohama F. Marinos	Home	2–2	18,059
34	2 December 2017	Ventforet Kofu	Away	0–1	14,680

== J.League Cup ==
Match	Date	Team	Venue	Score	Attendance
Group A-1	15 March 2017	FC Tokyo	Away	0–6	8,424
Group A-2	12 April 2017	Júbilo Iwata	Home	2–0	5,003
Group A-3	26 April 2017	Shimizu S-Pulse	Home	3–1	5,092
Group A-4	3 May 2017	Omiya Ardija	Away	2–1	8,307
Group A-5	10 May 2017	Kashiwa Reysol	Home	1–1	5,608
Group A-6	24 May 2017	Hokkaido Consadole Sapporo	Away	2–1	5,865
Quarterfinals-1	30 August 2017	Kashima Antlers	Home	3–1	6,659
Quarterfinals-2	3 September 2017	Kashima Antlers	Away	2–3	11,943
Semi-finals-1	4 October 2017	Kawasaki Frontale	Home	3–2	8,382
Semi-finals-2	8 October 2017	Kawasaki Frontale	Away	1–3	22,385

*

== Honours ==
=== Individual ===
- Monthly Best Goal
  - (Brazil) Crislan
- TAG Heuer YOUNG GUNS AWARD
  - (Japan) Takuma Nishimura

=== J.League Cup ===
- J.League Cup Award
  - (Japan) Takuma Nishimura
- Top Scorer
  - (Brazil) Crislan

=== Others ===
- Fair-Play award
  - Vegalta Sendai
