= 2018 Emperor's Cup =

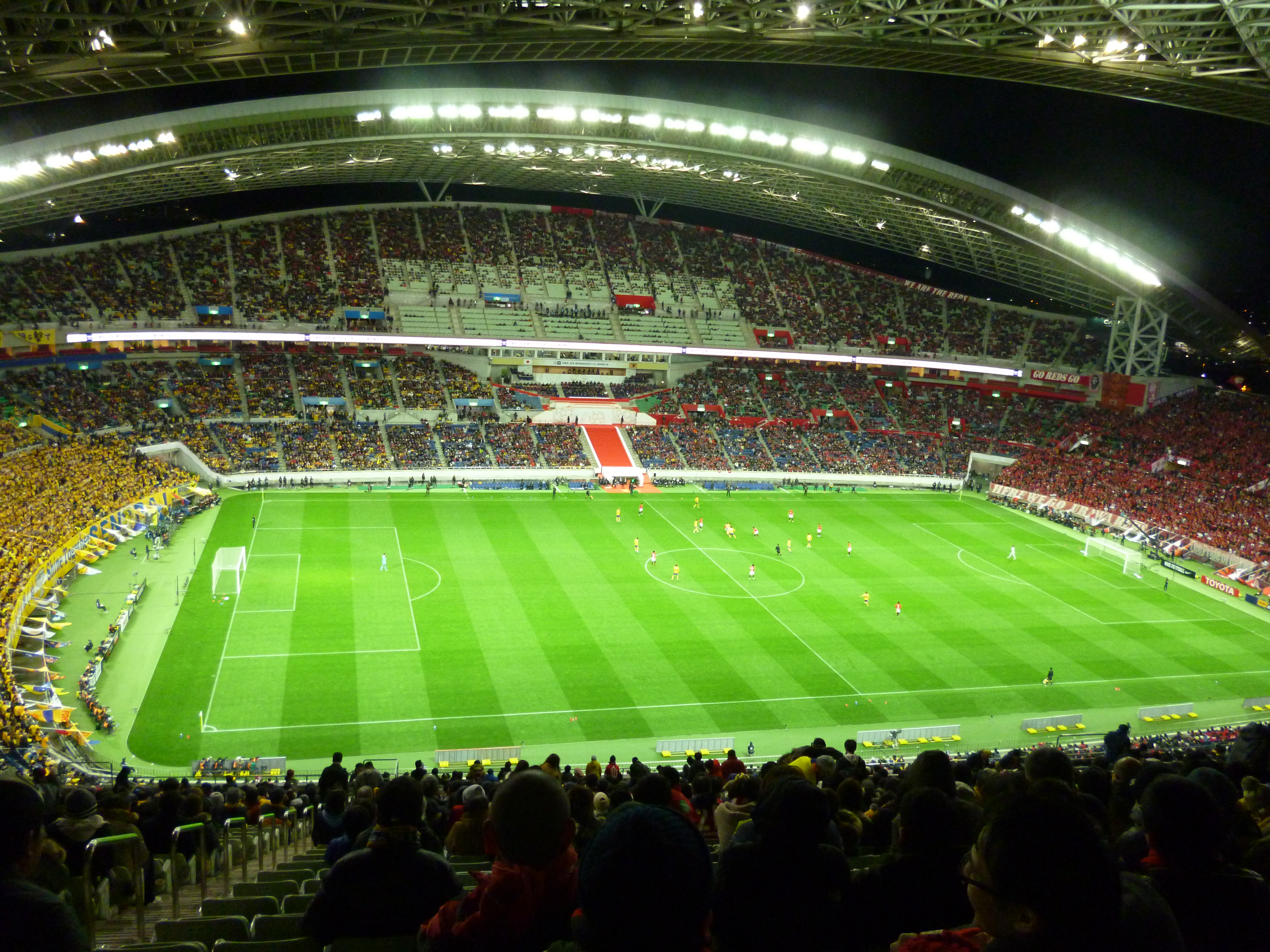
- 2018 Emperor's Cup Final at Saitama Stadium 2002

Tournament details
- Country: Japan
- Dates: 26 May – 9 December
- Teams: 88

Final positions
- Champions: Urawa Red Diamonds (7th title)
- Runners-up: Vegalta Sendai
- AFC Champions League: Urawa Red Diamonds

The 98th Emperor's Cup (天皇杯 JFA 第98回全日本サッカー選手権大会) was the 2018 edition of the annual Japanese national football cup tournament, which began on 26 May 2018 and ended with the final on 9 December 2018 at the Saitama Stadium 2002. The final was held earlier than the usual date of 1 January due to the 2019 AFC Asian Cup.

The draw for the first four rounds was held on 29 March 2018.

As a result of its win, Urawa Red Diamonds automatically qualified to the group stage of the 2019 AFC Champions League.

== Calendar ==
Round	Date	Matches	Clubs	New entries this round
First round	26–27 May	24	47+1 → 24	47 prefectural cup winners; 1 Amateur Best Team
Second round	6 June	32	24+40 → 32	18 J1 clubs; 22 J2 clubs
Third round	11 July, 22 August	16	32 → 16	
Fourth round	22 August, 26 September	8	16 → 8	
Quarter-finals	24 October, 21 November	4	8 → 4	
Semi-finals	5 December	2	4 → 2	
Final	9 December	1	2 → 1	

== Participating clubs ==
88 clubs competed in the tournament. Clubs playing in the 2018 J1 League and 2018 J2 League received a bye to the second round of the tournament. The remaining teams entered in the first round.

2018 J1 League all clubs	2018 J2 League all clubs	Amateur Best Team	47 prefectural tournament winners	
Cerezo Osaka; Consadole Sapporo; FC Tokyo; Gamba Osaka; Júbilo Iwata; Kashima Antlers; Kashiwa Reysol; Kawasaki Frontale; Nagoya Grampus; Sagan Tosu; Sanfrecce Hiroshima; Shimizu S-Pulse; Shonan Bellmare; Urawa Red Diamonds; V-Varen Nagasaki; Vegalta Sendai; Vissel Kobe; Yokohama F. Marinos	Albirex Niigata; Avispa Fukuoka; Ehime FC; Fagiano Okayama; FC Gifu; JEF United Chiba; Kamatamare Sanuki; Kyoto Sanga; Machida Zelvia; Matsumoto Yamaga; Mito HollyHock; Montedio Yamagata; Oita Trinita; Omiya Ardija; Renofa Yamaguchi; Roasso Kumamoto; Thespakusatsu Gunma; Tokushima Vortis; Tokyo Verdy; Ventforet Kofu; Yokohama FC; Zweigen Kanazawa	Ryutsu Keizai University	Hokkaido: Hokkaido UE Iwamizawa; Aomori: ReinMeer Aomori; Iwate: Grulla Morioka; Miyagi: Sony Sendai FC; Akita: Blaublitz Akita; Yamagata: Yamagata University; Fukushima: Iwaki FC; Ibaraki: RKU Dragons Ryugasaki; Tochigi: Sakushin Gakuin University; Gunma: Thespakusatsu Gunma; Saitama: Tokyo International University; Chiba: Vonds Ichihara; Tokyo: Komazawa University; Kanagawa: YSCC Yokohama; Yamanashi: Nirasaki Astros; Nagano: AC Nagano Parceiro; Niigata: Niigata University HW; Toyama: Kataller Toyama; Ishikawa: Kanazawa Seiryo University; Fukui: Saurcos Fukui; Shizuoka: Honda FC; Aichi: Chukyo University; Mie: Suzuka Unlimited; Gifu: NK Kani	Shiga: MIO Biwako Shiga; Kyoto: Ococias Kytoo; Osaka: FC Osaka; Hyōgo: Kwansei Gakuin University; Nara: Nara Club; Wakayama: Arterivo Wakayama; Tottori: Gainare Tottori; Shimane: Matsue City FC; Okayama: Mitsubishi Mizushima; Hiroshima: SRC Hiroshima; Yamaguchi: Tokuyama University; Kagawa: Tadotsu FC; Tokushima: FC Tokushima; Ehime: FC Imabari; Kōchi: Kochi United; Fukuoka: Fukuoka University; Saga: Saga Lixil; Nagasaki: Nagasaki Institute of Applied Science; Kumamoto: Tokai University Kumamoto; Ōita: Verspah Oita; Miyazaki: Tegevajaro Miyazaki; Kagoshima: Kagoshima United; Okinawa: FC Ryukyu

== Results ==
=== First round ===
The first round matches were held on 26 and 27 May 2018.

26 May 2018	Iwaki FC	1–2	Sony Sendai	Iwaki
13:00		Report		Stadium: Iwaki Greenfield Stadium; Attendance: 2,298

26 May 2018	Tadotsu FC	2–2 (a.e.t.) (4–2 p)	Tokai University Kumamoto	Takamatsu
13:00		Report		Stadium: Kagawa Sports Park Soccer/Rugby Field; Attendance: 233

26 May 2018	Sakushin Gakuin University	3–3 (a.e.t.) (8–9 p)	ReinMeer Aomori	Utsunomiya
13:00		Report		Stadium: Tochigi Green Stadium; Attendance: 321

26 May 2018	Kochi United	2–0	Mitusbishi Mizushima	Haruno
13:00		Report		Stadium: Kochi Haruno Athletic Stadium; Attendance: 621

26 May 2018	AC Nagano Parceiro	3–2	Niigata University HW	Nagano
13:00		Report		Stadium: Minami Nagano Sports Park Stadium; Attendance: 1,641

26 May 2018	Arterivo Wakayama	2–3 (a.e.t.)	Honda FC	Wakayama
13:00		Report		Stadium: Kimiidera Athletic Stadium; Attendance: 670

26 May 2018	Nara Club	2–0	Kanazawa Seiryo University	Nara
13:00		Report		Stadium: Rohto Field Nara; Attendance: 333

26 May 2018	Saurcos Fukui	2–3 (a.e.t.)	Chukyo University	Sakai
13:00		Report		Stadium: Technoport Fukui Stadium; Attendance: 516

26 May 2018	FC Osaka	3–0	Tokuyama University	Osaka
14:00		Report		Stadium: Kincho Stadium; Attendance: 369

26 May 2018	FC Ryukyu	1–1 (a.e.t.) (5–6 p)	FC Imabari	Okinawa
19:00		Report		Stadium: Okinawa City Stadium; Attendance: 1,064

27 May 2018	Hokkaido UE Iwamizawa	1–1 (a.e.t.) (5–4 p)	Nirasaki Astros	Sapporo
13:00		Report		Stadium: Sapporo Atsubetsu Stadium; Attendance: 216

27 May 2018	SRC Hiroshima	0–4	Matsue City	Fukuyama
13:00		Report		Stadium: Fukuyama Stadium; Attendance: 454

27 May 2018	Fukuoka University	1–0	FC Tokushima	Fukuoka
13:00		Report		Stadium: Level5 Stadium; Attendance: 501

27 May 2018	Blaublitz Akita	0–1	Vonds Ichihara	Akita
13:00		Report		Stadium: Akita Yabase Athletic Field; Attendance: 506

27 May 2018	RKU Dragons Ryugasaki	2–0	Yamagata University	Kashima
13:00		Report		Stadium: Kashima Soccer Stadium; Attendance: 468

27 May 2018	Thespakusatsu Gunma	2–1	Komazawa University	Maebashi
13:00		Report		Stadium: Gumma Shikishima Football Stadium; Attendance: 1,357

27 May 2018	Gainare Tottori	1–1 (a.e.t.) (4–2 p)	Verspah Oita	Tottori
13:00		Report		Stadium: Tottori Bank Bird Stadium; Attendance: 783

27 May 2018	YSCC Yokohama	3–2	Tokyo International University	Hiratsuka
13:00		Report		Stadium: Shonan BMW Stadium Hiratsuka; Attendance: 715

27 May 2018	Suzuka Unlimited	0–1	Kwansei Gakuin University	Iga
13:00		Report		Stadium: Ueno Sports Park Stadium; Attendance: 715

27 May 2018	Kataller Toyama	1–0	Ococias Kyoto	Takaoka
13:00		Report		Stadium: Takaoka Sports Core; Attendance: 1,129

27 May 2018	Saga Lixil	0–3	Tegevajaro Miyazaki	Saga
13:00		Report		Stadium: Saga Stadium; Attendance: 364

27 May 2018	Grulla Morioka	1–2	Ryutsu Keizai University	Morioka
13:00		Report		Stadium: Iwagin Stadium; Attendance: 446

27 May 2018	NK Kani	0–3	MIO Biwako Shiga	Gifu
13:00		Report		Stadium: Gifu Memorial Center; Attendance: 631

27 May 2018	Kagoshima United	3–0	Nagasaki Institute AS	Kagoshima
13:00		Report		Stadium: Kagoshima Kamoike Stadium; Attendance: 1,026

=== Second round ===
The second round matches were held on 6 June 2018.

6 June 2018	Sanfrecce Hiroshima	2–0	Gainare Tottori	Fukuyama
18:30		Report		Stadium: Fukuyama Stadium; Attendance: 2,829

6 June 2018	Kawasaki Frontale	3–2	Sony Sendai	Kawasaki
19:00		Report		Stadium: Kawasaki Todoroki Stadium; Attendance: 5,488

6 June 2018	Mito HollyHock	2–0	Ehime FC	Mito
19:00		Report		Stadium: K's denki Stadium Mito; Attendance: 898

6 June 2018	Shonan Bellmare	1–0	Hokkaido UE Iwamizawa	Hiratsuka
19:00		Report		Stadium: Shonan BMW Stadium Hiratsuka; Attendance: 921

6 June 2018	V-Varen Nagasaki	2–1 (a.e.t.)	Matsue City	Nagasaki
19:00		Report		Stadium: Nagasaki City Kakidomari Stadium; Attendance: 1,454

6 June 2018	Sagan Tosu	7–0	Tadotsu FC	Tosu
19:00		Report		Stadium: Best Amenity Stadium; Attendance: 2,314

6 June 2018	Tokushima Vortis	1–0	Tochigi SC	Naruto
19:00		Report		Stadium: Pocarisweat Stadium; Attendance: 1,309

6 June 2018	Vissel Kobe	3–0	Fukuoka University	Kobe
19:00		Report		Stadium: Noevir Stadium Kobe; Attendance: 2,202; Referee: Jumpei Iida

6 June 2018	JEF United Chiba	2–2 (a.e.t.) (5–4 p)	ReinMeer Aomori	Chiba
19:00		Report		Stadium: Fukuda Denshi Arena; Attendance: 2,064

6 June 2018	Kashiwa Reysol	6–0	Vonds Ichihara	Kashiwa
19:00		Report		Stadium: Sankyo Frontier Kashiwa Stadium; Attendance: 2,429

6 June 2018	Montedio Yamagata	2–2 (a.e.t.) (4–2 p)	FC Gifu	Tendō
19:00		Report		Stadium: ND Soft Stadium Yamagata; Attendance: 1,863

6 June 2018	FC Tokyo	4–2	RKU Dragons Ryugasaki	Chōfu
19:00		Report		Stadium: Ajinomoto Stadium; Attendance: 3,617

6 June 2018	Albirex Niigata	0–0 (a.e.t.) (5–3 p)	Kochi United	Niigata
19:00		Report		Stadium: Denka Big Swan Stadium; Attendance: 2,241

6 June 2018	Yokohama F. Marinos	4–3	FC Osaka	Yokohama
19:00		Report		Stadium: NHK Spring Mitsuzawa Football Stadium; Attendance: 3,096

6 June 2018	Yokohama FC	2–0	Kamatamare Sanuki	Marugame
19:00		Report		Stadium: Pikara Stadium; Attendance: 871

6 June 2018	Vegalta Sendai	4–0	Thespakusatsu Gunma	Sendai
19:00		Report		Stadium: Yurtec Stadium Sendai; Attendance: 2,685; Referee: Yuichi Nishimura

6 June 2018	Omiya Ardija	1–0	Nagano Parceiro	Saitama
19:00		Report		Stadium: NACK5 Stadium Omiya; Attendance: 1,937

6 June 2018	Kashima Antlers	6–1	Honda FC	Kashima
19:00		Report		Stadium: Kashima Soccer Stadium; Attendance: 3,172; Referee: Yudai Yamamoto

6 June 2018	Fagiano Okayama	0–1 (a.e.t.)	Machida Zelvia	Okayama
19:00		Report		Stadium: City Light Stadium; Attendance: 1,986

6 June 2018; 28 June 2018	Nagoya Grampus	1–1 (a.e.t.) (7–6 p)	Nara Club	Nagoya
		Report		Stadium: Paloma Mizuho Stadium

6 June 2018	Urawa Red Diamonds	3–0	YSCC Yokohama	Saitama
19:00	Own goal 34' (o.g.); Koroki 45+2' (pen.); Yamada 90'	Report		Stadium: Urawa Komaba Stadium; Attendance: 4,276; Referee: N. Murakami

6 June 2018	Matsumoto Yamaga	1–1 (a.e.t.) (5–4 p)	Roasso Kumamoto	Matsumoto
19:00		Report		Stadium: Matsumotodaira Park Stadium; Attendance: 4,243

6 June 2018	Gamba Osaka	1–2 (a.e.t.)	Kwansei Gakuin University	Suita
19:00		Report		Stadium: Panasonic Stadium Suita; Attendance: 3,103

6 June 2018	Tokyo Verdy	3–2	Kataller Toyama	Kita
19:00		Report		Stadium: Ajinomoto Field Nishigaoka; Attendance: 790

6 June 2018	Cerezo Osaka	1–0	Tegevajaro Miyazaki	Osaka
19:00		Report		Stadium: Kincho Stadium; Attendance: 2,565

6 June 2018	Kyoto Sanga	1–3 (a.e.t.)	Zweigen Kanazawa	Kyoto
19:00		Report		Stadium: Kyoto Nishikyogoku Athletic Stadium; Attendance: 816

6 June 2018	Shimizu S-Pulse	1–0	FC Imabari	Shizuoka
19:00		Report		Stadium: IAI Stadium Nihondaira; Attendance: 2,189

6 June 2018	Ventforet Kofu	3–1	Ryutsu Keizai University	Kōfu
19:00		Report		Stadium: Yamanashi Chuo Bank Stadium; Attendance: 1,377

6 June 2018	Júbilo Iwata	3–2 (a.e.t.)	Chukyo University	Iwata
19:00		Report		Stadium: Yamaha Stadium; Attendance: 2,230

6 June 2018	Oita Trinita	1–2	Renofa Yamaguchi	Yamaguchi
19:00		Report		Stadium: Ishin Me-Life Stadium; Attendance: 2,728

6 June 2018	Consadole Sapporo	2–1	MIO Biwako Shiga	Sapporo
19:00		Report		Stadium: Sapporo Atsubetsu Stadium; Attendance: 2,668

6 June 2018	Avispa Fukuoka	1–0	Kagoshima United	Fukuoka
19:00		Report		Stadium: Level5 Stadium; Attendance: 1,505

Notes

1: In this match, the original penalty shoot-out ended 4 – 5 as a win for Nara Club; however, on 11 June the JFA ruled that due to a mis-application of rules during the fourth shot taken by Nara Club, the penalty shoot-out would be replayed from the beginning. The replayed penalty shoot-out was held on 28 June 2018.

=== Third round ===
The third round matches were held on 11 July and 22 August 2018.

11 July 2018	Kashima Antlers	5–1	Machida Zelvia	Machida
18:30		Report		Stadium: Machida Stadium; Attendance: 5,589

11 July 2018	Kawasaki Frontale	1–1 (a.e.t.) (4–2 p)	Mito HollyHock	Mito
19:00		Report		Stadium: K's denki Stadium Mito; Attendance: 3,058; Referee: Jumpei Iida

11 July 2018	Shonan Bellmare	1–1 (a.e.t.) (4–3 p)	V-Varen Nagasaki	Hiratsuka
19:00		Report		Stadium: Shonan BMW Stadium Hiratsuka; Attendance: 2,080; Referee: Yudai Yamamoto

11 July 2018	Sagan Tosu	3–1	Tokushima Vortis	Naruto
19:00		Report		Stadium: Pocarisweat Stadium; Attendance: 1,559

11 July 2018	Vissel Kobe	6–1	JEF United Chiba	Chiba
19:00		Report		Stadium: Fukuda Denshi Arena; Attendance: 3,540; Referee: Masaaki Toma

11 July 2018	Kashiwa Reysol	1–2	Montedio Yamagata	Tendō
19:00		Report		Stadium: ND Soft Stadium Yamagata; Attendance: 3,016

11 July 2018	FC Tokyo	3–1	Albirex Niigata	Niigata
19:00		Report		Stadium: Denka Big Swan Stadium; Attendance: 2,315

11 July 2018	Yokohama F. Marinos	2–1 (a.e.t.)	Yokohama FC	Yokohama
19:00		Report		Stadium: NHK Spring Mitsuzawa Football Stadium; Attendance: 10,435; Referee: Yuichi Nishimura

11 July 2018	Vegalta Sendai	1–0	Omiya Ardija	Saitama
19:00		Report		Stadium: NACK5 Stadium Omiya; Attendance: 3,752

11 July 2018	Urawa Red Diamonds	2–1	Matsumoto Yamaga	Matsumoto
19:00	Maurício 42', 85'	Report	Nagai 10'	Stadium: Matsumotodaira Park Stadium; Attendance: 12,077; Referee: T. Kakinuma

11 July 2018	Kwansei Gakuin University	0–1	Tokyo Verdy	Kita
19:00		Report		Stadium: Ajinomoto Field Nishigaoka; Attendance: 1,668

11 July 2018	Cerezo Osaka	3–0	Zweigen Kanazawa	Kanazawa
19:00		Report		Stadium: Ishikawa Athletics Stadium; Attendance: 5,540

11 July 2018	Shimizu S-Pulse	0–1	Ventforet Kofu	Kōfu
19:00		Report		Stadium: Yamanashi Chuo Bank Stadium; Attendance: 2,682

11 July 2018	Júbilo Iwata	4–1	Renofa Yamaguchi	Yamaguchi
19:00		Report		Stadium: Ishin Me-Life Stadium; Attendance: 4,948

11 July 2018	Consadole Sapporo	4–0	Avispa Fukuoka	Fukuoka
19:00		Report		Stadium: Level5 Stadium; Attendance: 1,736

22 August 2018	Sanfrecce Hiroshima	4–1 (a.e.t.)	Nagoya Grampus	Hiroshima
19:00		Report		Stadium: Edion Stadium Hiroshima; Attendance: 2,822

Notes

2: Postponed to 22 August due to the 2018 Japan floods.

=== Fourth round ===
The fourth round matches were held on 22 August and 26 September 2018.

22 August 2018	Kawasaki Frontale	3–1	Shonan Bellmare	Kawasaki
19:00	Okazaki 47' (o.g.); Saitō 54'; Chinen 87' (pen.)	Report	Ogawa 15'	Stadium: Kawasaki Todoroki Stadium; Attendance: 8,553; Referee: Yoshiro Imamura

22 August 2018	Sagan Tosu	3–0	Vissel Kobe	Tosu
19:00	Watanabe 37' (o.g.); Anzai 50'; Torres 84'	Report		Stadium: Best Amenity Stadium; Attendance: 17,361; Referee: Koichiro Fukushima

22 August 2018	Montedio Yamagata	1–1 (a.e.t.) (7–6 p)	FC Tokyo	Tendō
19:00	Sakano 9'	Report	Oliveira 7' (pen.)	Stadium: ND Soft Stadium Yamagata; Attendance: 3,515; Referee: Yukie Kobaya
	Penalties
	Alves (penalty scored); Lopes (penalty scored); Kobayashi (penalty scored); Yamada (penalty scored); Nakamura (penalty scored); Kumamoto (penalty scored); Anzai (penalty scored)		(penalty scored) Morishige; (penalty scored) Jang Hyun-soo; (penalty scored) Higashi; (penalty scored) Nagai; (penalty scored) Yonemoto; (penalty scored) Muroya; (penalty missed) Togashi

22 August 2018	Yokohama F. Marinos	2–3	Vegalta Sendai	Yokohama
19:00	Hatanaka 40'; Kida 48'	Report	Ishihara 16', 54'; Germain 45+3'	Stadium: NHK Spring Mitsuzawa Football Stadium; Attendance: 5,977; Referee: Minoru Tōjō

22 August 2018	Urawa Red Diamonds	1–0	Tokyo Verdy	Kumagaya
19:00	Fabrício 64'	Report		Stadium: Kumagaya Athletic Stadium; Attendance: 6,458; Referee: Akihiko Ikeuchi

22 August 2018	Cerezo Osaka	0–1 (a.e.t.)	Ventforet Kofu	Kōfu
19:00		Report	Soneda 120'	Stadium: Yamanashi Chuo Bank Stadium; Attendance: 2,957; Referee: Yuichi Nishimura

26 September 2018	Kashima Antlers	2–0 (a.e.t.)	Sanfrecce Hiroshima	Kashima
19:00	Silva 96'; Misao 117'	Report		Stadium: Kashima Soccer Stadium; Attendance: 3,832; Referee: Toru Kakinuma

26 September 2018	Júbilo Iwata	4–2	Consadole Sapporo	Iwata
19:00	Kawamata 9'; Yamada 59'; Hayasaka 72' (o.g,); Araki 76'	Report	Hayasaka 11'; Hyodo 69'	Stadium: Yamaha Stadium; Attendance: 2,855; Referee: Hiroyuki Kimura

=== Quarter finals ===
The quarter-finals were held on 24 October 2018 and 21 November 2018.

24 October 2018	Urawa Red Diamonds	2–0	Sagan Tosu	Kumagaya
19:03	Ugajin 16'; Makino 31'	Report		Stadium: Kumagaya Athletic Stadium; Attendance: 7,867; Referee: Nobutsugu Murakami

24 October 2018	Júbilo Iwata	1–1 (a.e.t.) (3–4 p)	Vegalta Sendai	Iwata
19:03	Ogawa 9'	Report	Germain 86'	Stadium: Yamaha Stadium; Attendance: 4,068; Referee: Takuto Okabe
	Penalties
	Ogawa (penalty scored); Araki (penalty scored); Oi (penalty missed); Uehara (penalty scored); Miyazaki (penalty missed)		(penalty scored) Nagato; (penalty scored) Notsuda; (penalty scored) Ishihara; (penalty scored) Germain; (penalty missed) Havenaar

24 October 2018	Kawasaki Frontale	2–3	Montedio Yamagata	Tendō
19:03	Chinen 60', 70'	Report	Kobayashi 2'; Sakai 36'; Sakano 49'	Stadium: ND Soft Stadium Yamagata; Attendance: 5,356; Referee: Yusuke Araki

21 November 2018	Kashima Antlers	1–0	Ventforet Kofu	Kōfu
19:03	Doi 76'	Report		Stadium: Yamanashi Chuo Bank Stadium; Attendance: 6,243; Referee: Yuichi Nishimura

=== Semi finals ===
The semi-finals were originally scheduled to be held on 16 December 2018. However, the semi-finals were rescheduled after Kashima Antlers won the 2018 AFC Champions League, which would have created a scheduling conflict with Kashima's participation in the 2018 FIFA Club World Cup.

5 December 2018	Urawa Red Diamonds	1–0	Kashima Antlers	Kashima
19:04	Maurício 27'	Report		Stadium: Kashima Soccer Stadium; Attendance: 13,949; Referee: Koichiro Fukushima

5 December 2018	Vegalta Sendai	3–2	Montedio Yamagata	Sendai
19:04	Germain 14'; Yajima 18'; Hiraoka 36'	Report	Sakano 32', 44'	Stadium: Yurtec Stadium Sendai; Attendance: 16,604; Referee: Masaaki Toma

=== Final ===
The final was originally scheduled to be held on 24 December 2018. However, as it was the case for the semi-finals, it had to be rescheduled due to possible conflict with Kashima Antlers participation on the 2018 FIFA Club World Cup.

9 December 2018	Urawa Red Diamonds	1–0	Vegalta Sendai	Saitama
18:04	Ugajin 13'	Report		Stadium: Saitama Stadium 2002; Attendance: 50,978; Referee: Yudai Yamamoto
