= Yoshihiro Nakano =

Japanese footballer

Yoshihiro Nakano 中野 嘉大
Personal information
- Full name: Yoshihiro Nakano
- Date of birth: 24 February 1993 (age 33)
- Place of birth: Akune, Kagoshima, Japan
- Height: 1.76 m (5 ft 9 in)
- Position: Winger

Team information
- Current team: Blaublitz Akita
- Number: 77

Youth career
- Partida FC
- 2008–2010: Saga Higashi High School

College career
Years	Team	Apps	(Gls)
2011–2014	University of Tsukuba		

Senior career*
Years	Team	Apps	(Gls)
2015–2017	Kawasaki Frontale	25	(1)
2017	→ Vegalta Sendai (loan)	18	(2)
2018	Vegalta Sendai	25	(2)
2019–2021	Hokkaido Consadole Sapporo	25	(0)
2021	→ Sagan Tosu (loan)	29	(1)
2022	Sagan Tosu	4	(0)
2022−2024	Shonan Bellmare	23	(0)
2024	Yokohama FC (loan)	35	(4)
2025	Yokohama FC	5	(0)
2026–	Blaublitz Akita	19	(0)
Medal record
Kawasaki Frontale
Runner-up	Emperor's Cup	2016
Vegalta Sendai
Runner-up	Emperor's Cup	2018
- * Club domestic league appearances and goals as of 14 August 2026

Yoshihiro Nakano (中野 嘉大, Nakano Yoshihiro; born 24 February 1993) is a Japanese footballer who plays for Blaublitz Akita.

== Early life ==
Yoshihiro was born in Akune. He went to the University of Tsukuba.

== Career ==
Yoshihiro made his debut for Kawasaki against Shonan Bellmare on the 22nd of August 2015, coming on in the 57th minute for Kentaro Moriya. He scored his first goal for Kawasaki against Gamba Osaka in the 55th minute on the 4th of October 2015.

== Career statistics ==
Last update: 9 July 2022.

Appearances and goals by club, season and competition
Club	Season	League			Emperor's Cup		J.League Cup		AFC		Total	
Club	Season	Division	Apps	Goals	Apps	Goals	Apps	Goals	Apps	Goals	Apps	Goals
Kawasaki Frontale	2015	J1 League	10	1	3	0	0	0	0	0	13	1
Kawasaki Frontale	2016	J1 League	15	0	2	0	4	0	0	0	21	0
Vegalta Sendai	2017	J1 League	18	2	1	2	5	2	-		24	6
Vegalta Sendai	2018	J1 League	25	2	5	1	4	0	-		34	3
Consadole Sapporo	2019	J1 League	19	0	0	0	10	0	0	0	29	0
Consadole Sapporo	2020	J1 League	6	0	0	0	3	0	0	0	9	0
Consadole Sapporo	2021	J1 League	0	0	0	0	0	0	0	0	0	0
Sagan Tosu (loan)	2021	J1 League	29	0	3	0	2	0	0	0	34	0
Sagan Tosu	2022	J1 League	4	0	2	0	5	0	0	0	11	0
Career total			126	5	16	3	33	2	0	0	175	10
