= 2016 Vegalta Sendai season =

Vegalta Sendai
2016 season
- Chairman: Nishikawa Yoshihisa
- Manager: Susumu Watanabe
- Stadium: Yurtec Stadium Sendai
- J1 League: 12th
- J.League Cup: group stage
- Emperor's Cup: 2nd round
- Top goalscorer: League: Ramon Lopes; All: Ramon Lopes
Home colours	Away colours

The 2016 Vegalta Sendai season saw the club compete in the J1 League, the top tier of Japanese football, in which they finished 12th.

== J1 League ==
=== League table ===
Pos	Team	Pld	W	D	L	GF	GA	GD	Pts
10	Yokohama F. Marinos	34	13	12	9	53	38	+15	51
11	Sagan Tosu	34	12	10	12	36	37	−1	46
12	Vegalta Sendai	34	13	4	17	39	48	−9	43
13	Júbilo Iwata	34	8	12	14	37	50	−13	36
14	Ventforet Kofu	34	7	10	17	32	58	−26	31

Source: Meiji Yasuda J1 League
Rules for classification: 1) Points; 2) Goal difference; 3) Goals scored.

=== Match details ===
J1 League match details
Match	Date	Team	Score	Team	Venue	Attendance
1-1	2016.02.27	Yokohama F. Marinos	0-1	Vegalta Sendai	Nissan Stadium	24,898
1-2	2016.03.06	Vegalta Sendai	1-2	FC Tokyo	Yurtec Stadium Sendai	16,918
1-3	2016.03.12	Vegalta Sendai	1-0	Kashima Antlers	Yurtec Stadium Sendai	15,826
1-4	2016.03.19	Nagoya Grampus	2-1	Vegalta Sendai	Paloma Mizuho Stadium	9,232
1-5	2016.04.01	Sanfrecce Hiroshima	3-0	Vegalta Sendai	Edion Stadium Hiroshima	9,587
1-6	2016.04.10	Vegalta Sendai	1-3	Gamba Osaka	Yurtec Stadium Sendai	18,011
1-7	2016.04.16	Urawa Reds	3-1	Vegalta Sendai	Saitama Stadium 2002	31,012
1-8	2016.04.24	Vissel Kobe	2-2	Vegalta Sendai	Noevir Stadium Kobe	12,678
1-9	2016.04.30	Vegalta Sendai	0-2	Sagan Tosu	Yurtec Stadium Sendai	14,032
1-10	2016.05.04	Kawasaki Frontale	1-1	Vegalta Sendai	Kawasaki Todoroki Stadium	23,812
1-11	2016.05.08	Vegalta Sendai	2-0	Avispa Fukuoka	Yurtec Stadium Sendai	12,504
1-12	2016.05.14	Vegalta Sendai	0-1	Omiya Ardija	Yurtec Stadium Sendai	12,892
1-13	2016.05.21	Shonan Bellmare	0-1	Vegalta Sendai	Shonan BMW Stadium Hiratsuka	11,581
1-14	2016.05.29	Vegalta Sendai	4-2	Albirex Niigata	Yurtec Stadium Sendai	15,049
1-15	2016.06.11	Kashiwa Reysol	0-2	Vegalta Sendai	Hitachi Kashiwa Stadium	9,534
1-16	2016.06.18	Vegalta Sendai	2-1	Ventforet Kofu	Yurtec Stadium Sendai	15,166
1-17	2016.06.25	Júbilo Iwata	3-0	Vegalta Sendai	Yamaha Stadium	12,070
2-1	2016.07.02	Vegalta Sendai	0-3	Kawasaki Frontale	Yurtec Stadium Sendai	15,415
2-2	2016.07.09	Gamba Osaka	3-1	Vegalta Sendai	Suita City Football Stadium	19,482
2-3	2016.07.13	Vegalta Sendai	0-1	Urawa Reds	Yurtec Stadium Sendai	14,056
2-4	2016.07.17	Albirex Niigata	1-2	Vegalta Sendai	Denka Big Swan Stadium	19,388
2-5	2016.07.23	Vegalta Sendai	1-0	Shonan Bellmare	Yurtec Stadium Sendai	13,612
2-6	2016.07.30	Avispa Fukuoka	1-1	Vegalta Sendai	Level5 Stadium	10,097
2-7	2016.08.06	Kashima Antlers	0-1	Vegalta Sendai	Kashima Soccer Stadium	13,982
2-8	2016.08.13	Vegalta Sendai	4-2	Kashiwa Reysol	Yurtec Stadium Sendai	16,873
2-9	2016.08.20	Omiya Ardija	2-1	Vegalta Sendai	NACK5 Stadium Omiya	9,480
2-10	2016.08.27	Vegalta Sendai	0-2	Sanfrecce Hiroshima	Yurtec Stadium Sendai	14,486
2-11	2016.09.10	Vegalta Sendai	0-1	Yokohama F. Marinos	Yurtec Stadium Sendai	16,668
2-12	2016.09.17	Ventforet Kofu	1-1	Vegalta Sendai	Yamanashi Chuo Bank Stadium	8,771
2-13	2016.09.25	Vegalta Sendai	1-2	Nagoya Grampus	Yurtec Stadium Sendai	16,476
2-14	2016.10.01	Sagan Tosu	2-3	Vegalta Sendai	Best Amenity Stadium	9,894
2-15	2016.10.22	Vegalta Sendai	3-0	Vissel Kobe	Yurtec Stadium Sendai	15,638
2-16	2016.10.29	FC Tokyo	1-0	Vegalta Sendai	Ajinomoto Stadium	21,198
2-17	2016.11.03	Vegalta Sendai	0-1	Júbilo Iwata	Yurtec Stadium Sendai	19,315

== Honours ==
=== Stadium grass best condition award ===
- Sendai Stadium
