= Nagasaki Institute of Applied Science =

Coordinates: 32°45′15″N 129°56′32″E

- (Nagasaki Sōgō Kagaku Daigaku)
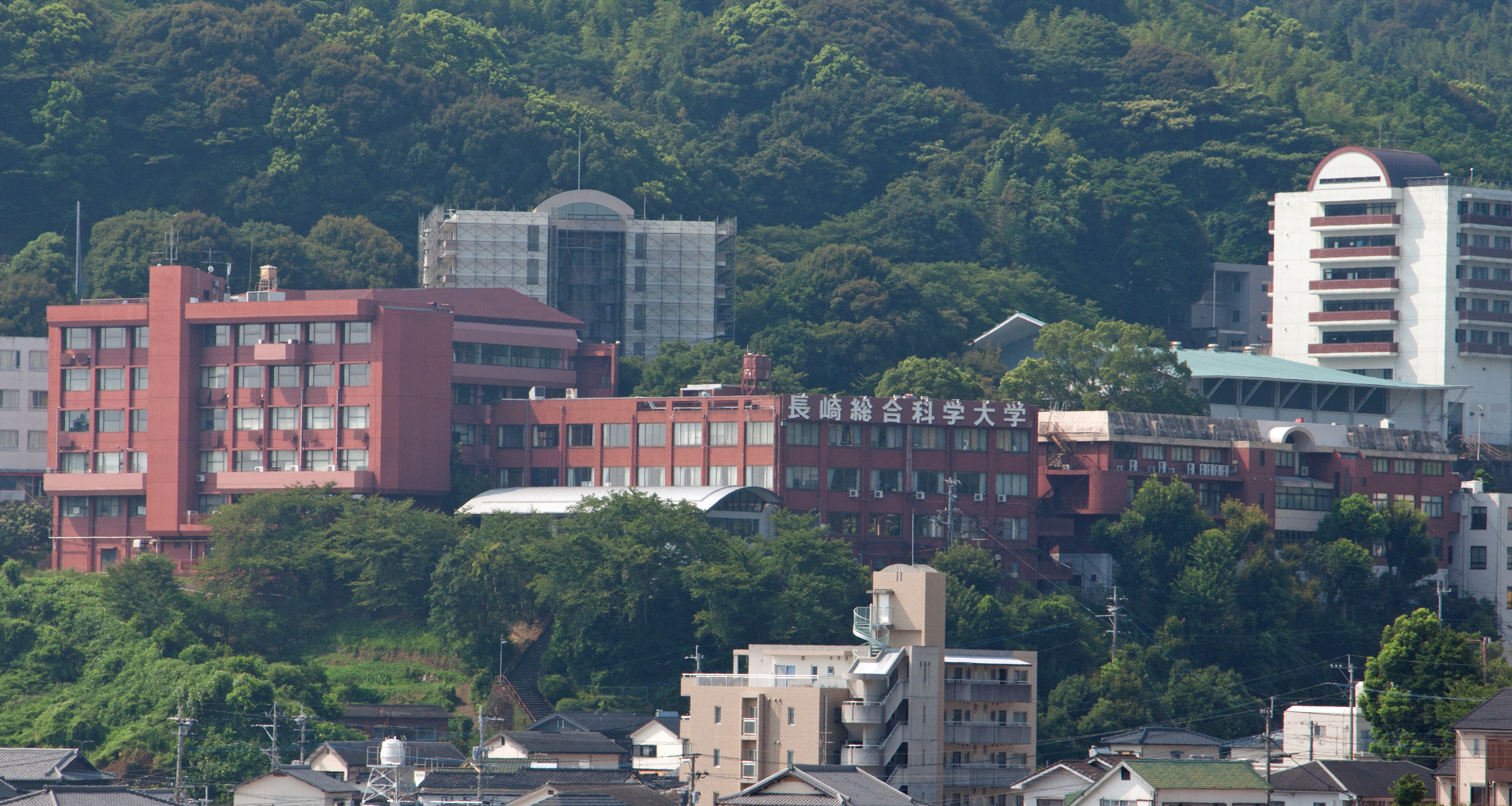
- Established: 1942
- President: Kazuma Hayashi
- Location: Nagasaki, Nagasaki Prefecture, Japan
- Campus: Urban
- Website: Nagasaki Institute of Applied Science

Nagasaki Institute of Applied Science (長崎総合科学大学, Nagasaki Sōgō Kagaku Daigaku) is a private Japanese university located in the city of Nagasaki, Nagasaki Prefecture, Japan. Its nickname is Sōkadai and its public abbreviation is Chōsōdai.
