= Daigo Araki =

Japanese footballer

Daigo Araki 荒木大吾
Personal information
- Full name: Daigo Araki
- Date of birth: 17 February 1994 (age 32)
- Place of birth: Chiba, Japan
- Height: 1.78 m (5 ft 10 in)
- Position: Midfielder

Team information
- Current team: FC Gifu
- Number: 8

Youth career
- 2006–2011: Kashiwa Reysol

College career
Years	Team	Apps	(Gls)
2012–2015	Aoyama Gakuin University		

Senior career*
Years	Team	Apps	(Gls)
2016–2019	Júbilo Iwata	82	(6)
2020–2024	Kyoto Sanga	101	(2)
2024-	FC Gifu	50	(8)
- * Club domestic league appearances and goals as of 1 January 2026

Daigo Araki (荒木 大吾, Araki, Daigo; born 17 February 1994, in Chiba) is a Japanese footballer who plays for FC Gifu.

== Club statistics ==
Updated to 19 February 2019.

Appearances and goals by club, season and competition
Club	Season	League			Emperor's Cup		J. League Cup		Total	
Club	Season	Division	Apps	Goals	Apps	Goals	Apps	Goals	Apps	Goals
Júbilo Iwata	2016	J1 League	1	0	3	0	2	0	6	0
Júbilo Iwata	2017	J1 League	5	0	2	0	2	0	9	0
Júbilo Iwata	2018	J1 League	16	0	4	1	7	2	27	3
Career total			22	0	9	1	11	2	42	3
