= 2015 Vegalta Sendai season =

Vegalta Sendai
2015 season
- Chairman: Nishikawa Yoshihisa
- Manager: Susumu Watanabe
- Stadium: Yurtec Stadium Sendai
- J1 League: 14th
- J.League Cup: group stage
- Emperor's Cup: quarterfinals
- Top goalscorer: League: Hiroaki Okuno; Hidetaka Kanazono; Ramon Lopes; All: Hiroaki Okuno
Home colours	Away colours

2015 Vegalta Sendai season.

== J1 League ==
=== League table ===
Pos	Team	Pld	W	D	L	GF	GA	GD	Pts
13	Ventforet Kofu	34	10	7	17	26	43	−17	37
14	Vegalta Sendai	34	9	8	17	44	48	−4	35
15	Albirex Niigata	34	8	10	16	41	58	−17	34

Updated to match(es) played on 28 November 2015. Source: Meiji Yasuda J1 League Standings
Rules for classification: 1) Points; 2) Goal difference; 3) Goals scored

=== Match details ===
J1 League match details
Match	Date	Team	Score	Team	Venue	Attendance
1-1	2015.03.07	Vegalta Sendai	2-0	Montedio Yamagata	Yurtec Stadium Sendai	19,375
1-2	2015.03.13	Kashiwa Reysol	1-1	Vegalta Sendai	Hitachi Kashiwa Stadium	9,082
1-3	2015.03.22	Shonan Bellmare	0-0	Vegalta Sendai	Shonan BMW Stadium Hiratsuka	11,315
1-4	2015.04.04	Vegalta Sendai	2-1	Shimizu S-Pulse	Yurtec Stadium Sendai	14,706
1-5	2015.04.12	Yokohama F. Marinos	1-1	Vegalta Sendai	Nissan Stadium	20,207
1-6	2015.04.18	Vegalta Sendai	2-3	Kawasaki Frontale	Yurtec Stadium Sendai	13,644
1-7	2015.04.25	Matsumoto Yamaga FC	1-0	Vegalta Sendai	Matsumotodaira Park Stadium	13,772
1-8	2015.04.29	Vegalta Sendai	1-2	Kashima Antlers	Yurtec Stadium Sendai	17,011
1-9	2015.05.02	Sanfrecce Hiroshima	2-0	Vegalta Sendai	Edion Stadium Hiroshima	15,566
1-10	2015.05.06	Vegalta Sendai	2-3	FC Tokyo	Yurtec Stadium Sendai	14,368
1-11	2015.05.10	Vegalta Sendai	4-4	Urawa Reds	Yurtec Stadium Sendai	19,195
1-12	2015.05.16	Albirex Niigata	0-3	Vegalta Sendai	Denka Big Swan Stadium	16,764
1-13	2015.05.23	Vegalta Sendai	0-1	Ventforet Kofu	Yurtec Stadium Sendai	13,165
1-14	2015.05.30	Vissel Kobe	0-1	Vegalta Sendai	Noevir Stadium Kobe	14,906
1-15	2015.06.07	Vegalta Sendai	5-0	Sagan Tosu	Yurtec Stadium Sendai	12,753
1-16	2015.06.20	Gamba Osaka	1-1	Vegalta Sendai	Expo '70 Commemorative Stadium	14,616
1-17	2015.06.27	Vegalta Sendai	2-0	Nagoya Grampus	Yurtec Stadium Sendai	12,644
2-1	2015.07.11	Vegalta Sendai	3-4	Sanfrecce Hiroshima	Yurtec Stadium Sendai	13,373
2-2	2015.07.15	Ventforet Kofu	0-0	Vegalta Sendai	Yamanashi Chuo Bank Stadium	7,015
2-3	2015.07.19	Vegalta Sendai	1-2	Vissel Kobe	Yurtec Stadium Sendai	12,488
2-4	2015.07.25	Vegalta Sendai	0-1	Kashiwa Reysol	Yurtec Stadium Sendai	13,070
2-5	2015.07.29	FC Tokyo	3-1	Vegalta Sendai	Ajinomoto Stadium	16,635
2-6	2015.08.12	Vegalta Sendai	3-1	Matsumoto Yamaga FC	Yurtec Stadium Sendai	15,757
2-7	2015.08.16	Kashima Antlers	3-2	Vegalta Sendai	Kashima Soccer Stadium	16,554
2-8	2015.08.22	Urawa Reds	3-1	Vegalta Sendai	Saitama Stadium 2002	33,932
2-9	2015.08.29	Vegalta Sendai	0-1	Albirex Niigata	Yurtec Stadium Sendai	14,573
2-10	2015.09.12	Nagoya Grampus	0-1	Vegalta Sendai	Toyota Stadium	21,008
2-11	2015.09.19	Vegalta Sendai	1-1	Shonan Bellmare	Yurtec Stadium Sendai	12,635
2-12	2015.09.26	Montedio Yamagata	1-1	Vegalta Sendai	ND Soft Stadium Yamagata	13,737
2-13	2015.10.03	Vegalta Sendai	1-3	Yokohama F. Marinos	Yurtec Stadium Sendai	15,685
2-14	2015.10.17	Shimizu S-Pulse	0-1	Vegalta Sendai	IAI Stadium Nihondaira	13,399
2-15	2015.10.25	Vegalta Sendai	1-3	Gamba Osaka	Yurtec Stadium Sendai	19,263
2-16	2015.11.07	Sagan Tosu	1-0	Vegalta Sendai	Best Amenity Stadium	13,860
2-17	2015.11.22	Kawasaki Frontale	1-0	Vegalta Sendai	Kawasaki Todoroki Stadium	22,511

== Honours ==
=== Individual ===
- Monthly Best Goal
  - (North Korea) Ryang Yong-gi
- Meritorious Player Award
  - (Japan) Atsushi Yanagisawa
