= 2018 Ventforet Kofu season =

Ventforet Kofu
2018 season
- Manager: Tatsuma Yoshida; Nobuhiro Ueno
- Stadium: Yamanashi Chuo Bank Stadium
- J2 League: 9th

2018 Ventforet Kofu season.

== J2 League ==
Match	Date	Team	Score	Team	Venue	Attendance
1	2018.02.25	Omiya Ardija	2-1	Ventforet Kofu	NACK5 Stadium Omiya	11,777
2	2018.03.03	Ventforet Kofu	0-0	Tokyo Verdy	Yamanashi Chuo Bank Stadium	10,192
3	2018.03.11	FC Machida Zelvia	0-0	Ventforet Kofu	Machida Stadium	5,802
4	2018.03.17	Avispa Fukuoka	0-2	Ventforet Kofu	Level5 Stadium	7,189
5	2018.03.21	Ventforet Kofu	0-1	Tokushima Vortis	Yamanashi Chuo Bank Stadium	3,130
6	2018.03.25	Fagiano Okayama	1-0	Ventforet Kofu	City Light Stadium	10,278
7	2018.04.01	FC Gifu	3-4	Ventforet Kofu	Gifu Nagaragawa Stadium	6,796
8	2018.04.07	Ventforet Kofu	1-1	Mito HollyHock	Yamanashi Chuo Bank Stadium	6,741
9	2018.04.14	Ventforet Kofu	0-1	Matsumoto Yamaga FC	Yamanashi Chuo Bank Stadium	9,659
10	2018.04.21	Ehime FC	0-0	Ventforet Kofu	Ningineer Stadium	2,255
11	2018.04.28	Ventforet Kofu	1-1	JEF United Chiba	Yamanashi Chuo Bank Stadium	8,814
12	2018.05.03	Ventforet Kofu	1-1	Renofa Yamaguchi FC	Yamanashi Chuo Bank Stadium	8,416
13	2018.05.06	Roasso Kumamoto	1-4	Ventforet Kofu	Egao Kenko Stadium	4,094
14	2018.05.12	Ventforet Kofu	2-1	Tochigi SC	Yamanashi Chuo Bank Stadium	6,430
15	2018.05.20	Kamatamare Sanuki	0-3	Ventforet Kofu	Pikara Stadium	2,259
16	2018.05.26	Ventforet Kofu	6-2	Oita Trinita	Yamanashi Chuo Bank Stadium	7,639
19	2018.06.16	Ventforet Kofu	1-2	Montedio Yamagata	Yamanashi Chuo Bank Stadium	7,755
17	2018.06.20	Albirex Niigata	1-5	Ventforet Kofu	Denka Big Swan Stadium	8,614
20	2018.06.24	Yokohama FC	1-0	Ventforet Kofu	NHK Spring Mitsuzawa Football Stadium	9,079
21	2018.06.30	Ventforet Kofu	1-1	Kyoto Sanga FC	Yamanashi Chuo Bank Stadium	8,796
18	2018.07.04	Ventforet Kofu	1-3	Zweigen Kanazawa	Yamanashi Chuo Bank Stadium	3,782
22	2018.07.07	Oita Trinita	2-4	Ventforet Kofu	Oita Bank Dome	7,152
23	2018.07.15	Ventforet Kofu	1-3	FC Gifu	Yamanashi Chuo Bank Stadium	7,798
24	2018.07.21	Ventforet Kofu	3-2	Roasso Kumamoto	Yamanashi Chuo Bank Stadium	6,530
25	2018.07.25	JEF United Chiba	2-1	Ventforet Kofu	Fukuda Denshi Arena	8,983
26	2018.07.29	Matsumoto Yamaga FC	1-0	Ventforet Kofu	Matsumotodaira Park Stadium	14,197
27	2018.08.04	Ventforet Kofu	1-2	Avispa Fukuoka	Yamanashi Chuo Bank Stadium	7,064
28	2018.08.11	Zweigen Kanazawa	1-2	Ventforet Kofu	Ishikawa Athletics Stadium	4,598
29	2018.08.18	Ventforet Kofu	0-1	Ehime FC	Yamanashi Chuo Bank Stadium	7,087
30	2018.08.25	Kyoto Sanga FC	1-1	Ventforet Kofu	Kyoto Nishikyogoku Athletic Stadium	5,483
31	2018.09.01	Ventforet Kofu	0-2	FC Machida Zelvia	Yamanashi Chuo Bank Stadium	6,908
33	2018.09.15	Montedio Yamagata	1-1	Ventforet Kofu	ND Soft Stadium Yamagata	6,708
32	2018.09.19	Ventforet Kofu	1-0	Omiya Ardija	Yamanashi Chuo Bank Stadium	5,631
34	2018.09.22	Ventforet Kofu	2-0	Fagiano Okayama	Yamanashi Chuo Bank Stadium	6,810
36	2018.10.06	Tokyo Verdy	0-1	Ventforet Kofu	Ajinomoto Stadium	6,460
37	2018.10.13	Ventforet Kofu	0-0	Albirex Niigata	Yamanashi Chuo Bank Stadium	8,418
35	2018.10.16	Tokushima Vortis	0-1	Ventforet Kofu	Pocarisweat Stadium	3,217
38	2018.10.21	Tochigi SC	2-2	Ventforet Kofu	Tochigi Green Stadium	5,336
39	2018.10.28	Ventforet Kofu	1-0	Kamatamare Sanuki	Yamanashi Chuo Bank Stadium	7,633
40	2018.11.04	Mito HollyHock	2-0	Ventforet Kofu	K's denki Stadium Mito	4,801
41	2018.11.11	Renofa Yamaguchi FC	0-1	Ventforet Kofu	Ishin Me-Life Stadium	8,145
42	2018.11.17	Ventforet Kofu	0-1	Yokohama FC	Yamanashi Chuo Bank Stadium	9,821
