= Toyofumi Sakano =

Japanese footballer

Toyofumi Sakano 阪野 豊史
Personal information
- Full name: Toyofumi Sakano
- Date of birth: 4 June 1990 (age 36)
- Place of birth: Misato, Saitama, Japan
- Height: 1.81 m (5 ft 11 in)
- Position: Forward

Youth career
- Misato FC
- –2007: Urawa Red Diamonds

College career
Years	Team	Apps	(Gls)
2008–2012	Meiji University		

Senior career*
Years	Team	Apps	(Gls)
2013–2016	Urawa Red Diamonds	9	(0)
2015	→ Tochigi SC (loan)	41	(6)
2016	→ Ehime FC (loan)	42	(12)
2017–2019	Montedio Yamagata	102	(29)
2019–2021	Matsumoto Yamaga	88	(14)
2022–2023	Tokyo Verdy	30	(6)
2023–2024	FC Imabari	43	(8)
Medal record
Urawa Reds
Runner-up	J1 League	2014
Runner-up	J.League Cup	2013
- * Club domestic league appearances and goals as of 26 December 2024, 16:28 (UTC)

Toyofumi Sakano (阪野 豊史, Sakano Toyofumi; born 4 June 1990 in Misato, Saitama) is a Japanese former footballer who plays as a forward.

A mainstay of the J2 League, Sakano made 290 appearances in that league and played in over 370 career matches.

== Career ==
On 16 July 2012, Urawa Reds announced that Sakano would be joining the team in the 2013 season. He made his professional debut for Urawa Red Diamonds in the AFC Champions League group-stage against Chinese Super League side Guangzhou Evergrande on 26 February 2013 in which he came on as a 59th-minute substitute for Márcio Richardes. Sakano then made his J. League Division 1 debut on 2 March 2013 against Sanfrecce Hiroshima, in which he came on as a 73rd-minute substitute for Shinzo Koroki.

On 25 December 2014, Sakano was announced at Tochigi SC on a one year loan deal.

On 7 January 2016, Sakano was announced at Ehime on a loan deal.

On 24 December 2016, Sakano was announced at Montedio Yamagata on a permanent transfer. During the 2017 season, he enjoyed a "happy rivalry" between himself and Yuji Senuma, who were both close to becoming the top scorer. On 19 December 2017, he signed a contract extension with the club for the 2018 season.

On 16 July 2019, Sakano was announced at Matsumoto Yamaga on a permanent transfer.

On 7 January 2022, Sakano was announced at Tokyo Verdy on a permanent transfer.

On 10 October 2023, Sakano was announced at FC Imabari on a permanent transfer.

On 13 January 2025, Sakano announced his retirement after an 11 year playing career.

== Coaching career ==
On 14 January 2025, Sakano was announced as a coach for Urawa Reds' U18 team.

== Career statistics ==
=== Club ===
As of the end 2024 season.

Club	Season	League			League Cup		Cup		AFC		Total	
Club	Season	Division	Apps	Goals	Apps	Goals	Apps	Goals	Apps	Goals	Apps	Goals
Urawa Red Diamonds	2013	J.League Div 1	9	0	0	0	2	1	4	0	15	1
Urawa Red Diamonds	2014	J.League Div 1	0	0	1	1	1	0	–		2	1
Tochigi SC	2015	J2 League	41	6	–		1	0	–		42	6
Ehime FC	2016	J2 League	42	12	–		2	1	–		44	13
Montedio Yamagata	2017	J2 League	42	13	–		2	0	–		44	13
Montedio Yamagata	2018	J2 League	39	9	–		3	4	–		42	13
Montedio Yamagata	2019	J2 League	21	7	–		1	0	–		22	7
Matsumoto Yamaga	2019	J1 League	13	2	1	0	0	0	–		14	2
Matsumoto Yamaga	2020	J2 League	42	9	–		0	0	–		42	9
Matsumoto Yamaga	2021	J2 League	33	3	–		0	0	–		33	3
Tokyo Verdy	2022	J2 League	10	3	0	0	1	0	–		11	3
Tokyo Verdy	2023	J2 League	20	3	0	0	1	0	–		21	3
FC Imabari	2022	J3 League	16	5	0	0	0	0	–		16	5
FC Imabari	2024	J3 League	27	3	1	0	1	0	–		29	3
Career total			355	75	3	1	17	8	4	0	379	84
