= Yurtec Stadium Sendai =

Football stadium in Sendai, Japan

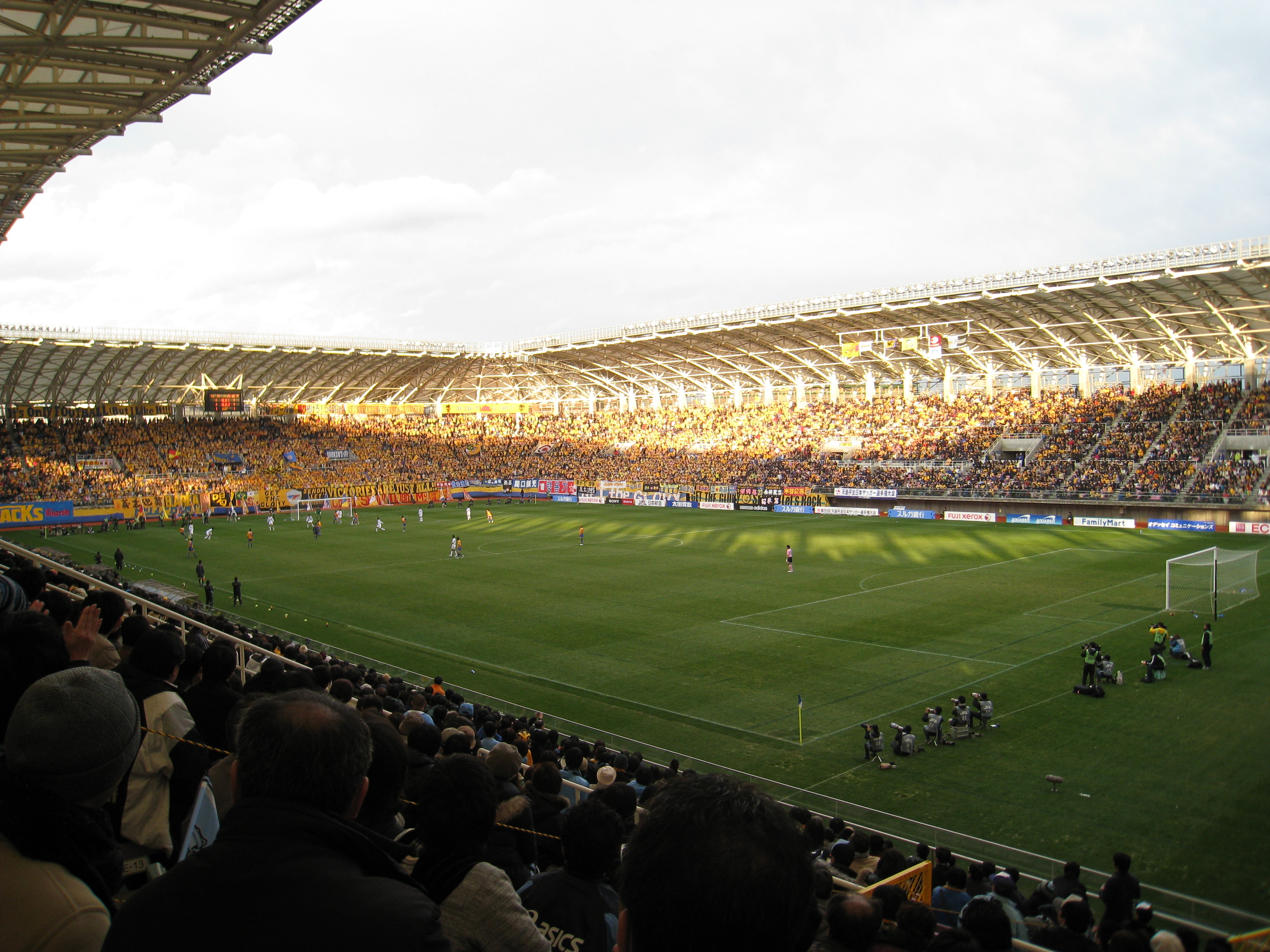
- The stadium on a matchday in 2009
- Interactive map of Yurtec Stadium Sendai
- Former names: Sendai Stadium (1997–2006)
- Location: Sendai, Japan
- Coordinates: 38°19′9″N 140°52′55″E
- Owner: Sendai City
- Operator: Sendai City Park Association
- Capacity: 19,134
- Surface: Grass
- Field size: 139 x 79 m
- Public transit: Sendai Subway: Namboku Line at Izumi-Chūō

Construction
- Opened: June 1997

Tenants
- Vegalta Sendai (J. League); Mynavi Sendai Ladies (WE League); Sony Sendai F.C. (JFL); Japan national football team

Yurtec Stadium Sendai (ユアテックスタジアム仙台) is a football stadium in the Nanakita Park, Izumi-ku, Sendai City, Miyagi Prefecture, Japan. Built in 1997, it is home to Vegalta Sendai, Mynavi Sendai Ladies and Sony Sendai. The stadium was specifically designed for football, and the stands are arranged close to the pitch. For games where the spectator capacity is insufficient, nearby Miyagi Stadium is occasionally used as a substitute.

== History ==
The naming rights for the stadium were sold beginning on March 1, 2006 until February 28, 2009. In that period, the stadium is officially known as Yurtec STADIUM SENDAI (ユアテックスタジアム仙台, Yuatekku Sutajiamu Sendai).

In 2009, the turf were replaced, and Vegalta played the first half of the season at Miyagi Stadium.

The stadium was damaged after the 2011 Tōhoku earthquake and tsunami.

It ranks among the top stadiums in Japan for its presence, comfort, and accessibility, and was once ranked second in an evaluation by a famous Japanese football media.

In June 2024, the park next to the stadium hosted the annual Pokémon GO Fest 2024 and around 400,000 attendees from all over the world participated in the event, making it the second largest Pokémon GO gathering after the 2023 one hosted in Osaka's Expo 70's Commemorative Stadium.

== International matches ==
=== Football ===
Italy used the stadium as their base for training camp during the 2002 World Cup, and cast images of the team members footprints are on display outside the stadium.

The Sendai Cup (An international youth football tournament) has been held annually since 2003. Italy, France Brazil, and Croatia have participated, along with the hosts, Japan.

Exhibition matches between Vegalta Sendai and A.C. ChievoVerona and S.S. Lazio have been played at Sendai Stadium as well. The match with Chievo in 2003 was the final club game for Oliver Bierhoff.

=== Rugby ===
On June 16, 2007, the stadium was the venue for Japan vs. Samoa in the 2007 IRB Pacific Nations Cup. It was the first time an international rugby game had been played in the Tōhoku region.

On June 15, 2008, Japan defeated Tonga 35–13 at the stadium in the 2008 IRB Pacific Nations Cup.

== Access ==
- Namboku Line: 8 minutes walk from Izumi-Chūō Station.

== See also ==
- List of stadiums in Japan
- Miyagi Stadium
